= Scarlett Spears =

American actress (born 2017)

- Born: Scarlett Brielle Spears; June 12, 2017 (age 9); Orlando, Florida, U.S.
- Occupation: Actress
- Years active: 2022–present

Scarlett Brielle Spears (born June 12, 2017) is an American actress. She is best known for playing Donna Corinthos in the soap opera General Hospital since 2022, Young Glinda in the 2025 film Wicked: For Good, and voicing Bonnie in Toy Story 5 (2026).

== Life and career ==
Scarlett Brielle Spears was born on June 12, 2017, in Orlando, Florida United States, to Sharline Spears and has two older brothers. She is of Puerto Rican descent. After doing some modelling jobs with an agency, she was discovered on Instagram by Randy, who became her manager, and got her to the TV auditions within a week. Her mother handles her social media account and helps her in memorising all the scripts.

A few weeks later, she got her first role in the soap opera General Hospital, and she has been playing the recurring role of the character Donna Corinthos since November 2022. She has also appeared in P!nk's music video "Never Gonna Not Dance Again" as a tantrum girl. As her career proceeded, she switched from private schooling to homeschooling, so to avoid the schedule overlap with her recordings.

In 2025, she debuted in the films by playing the younger version of Dora the Explorer in Alberto Belli's Dora and the Search for Sol Dorado, starring Samantha Lorraine in the main role. To get into the role, she got her haircut done to look like Dora, although she had just lost her two front teeth. Later in the same year, she gained further recognition for portraying the younger version of Glinda in Jon M. Chu's theatrical film Wicked: For Good. Working with Ariana Grande was a dream come true for her: she had been a fan of Grande since she was on Sam & Cat. She was also a featured artist in the recreated song "Elphaba, Glinda", which was originally performed for the promotional campaign of Wicked in the previous year.

== Filmography ==
=== Film ===
| Year | Title | Role | Notes |
|---|---|---|---|
| 2025 | Dora and the Search for Sol Dorado | Young Dora Márquez | |
| 2025 | Wicked: For Good | Young Glinda | |
| 2026 | Toy Story 5 | Bonnie Anderson | Voice; succeeding Madeleine McGraw from Toy Story 4 |

=== Television ===
| Year | Title | Role | Notes |
|---|---|---|---|
| 2022–present | General Hospital | Donna Corinthos | Recurring role |
| 2025 | Middlehood | Young Ella | |
