= Billy Madison =

1995 film by Tamra Davis

- Theatrical release poster
- Directed by: Tamra Davis
- Written by: Tim Herlihy; Adam Sandler
- Produced by: Robert Simonds
- Starring: Adam Sandler; Bradley Whitford; Josh Mostel; Bridgette Wilson; Norm Macdonald; Darren McGavin
- Cinematography: Victor Hammer
- Edited by: John Gilroy; Jeffrey Wolf
- Music by: Randy Edelman
- Production companies: Universal Pictures; Robert Simonds Productions
- Distributed by: Universal Pictures
- Release date: February 10, 1995
- Running time: 89 minutes
- Country: United States
- Language: English
- Budget: $10 million
- Box office: $26.4 million

Billy Madison is a 1995 American comedy film directed by Tamra Davis, written by Adam Sandler and Tim Herlihy, and produced by Robert Simonds. The film stars Sandler in the title role, alongside Bradley Whitford, Bridgette Wilson, Darren McGavin, Mark Beltzman, Larry Hankin, and Norm Macdonald in his feature film debut. It tells the story of a wealthy and immature man (Sandler) who must repeat grades 1 through 12 to prove himself worthy of inheriting his widowed father's (McGavin) company.

Billy Madison was produced by Robert Simonds Productions and released by Universal Pictures on February 10, 1995. The film debuted at number one at the North American box office and grossed approximately $26.4 million worldwide against a $10 million budget. The film received generally negative reviews from critics. However, in subsequent years, Billy Madison has developed a cult following and is frequently ranked as one of Sandler's most popular and defining works.

== Plot ==
Billy Madison is a dimwitted, immature, and spoiled 27-year-old heir to Madison Hotels, a Fortune 500 company founded by his parents, Emily and Brian Madison. Rather than preparing to take over the family business, Billy spends his days partying with friends and causing chaos on the estate. After he embarrasses his father during an important dinner meeting, Brian, who is widowed and retiring soon, decides to hand control of the company to his conniving vice president, Eric Gordon.

When Billy pleads for another chance, Brian reveals that he bribed teachers to help Billy pass school. The two strike a deal: Billy must complete grades 1 through 12, spending two weeks on each grade, to prove he is capable of running the company. Billy returns to elementary school, where he gradually earns the respect of his classmates and third grade teacher, Veronica Vaughn, especially after protecting a fellow student from embarrassment.

Billy's rapid academic progress alarms Eric, who learns elementary school principal Max Anderson was once the professional wrestler called "the Revolting Blob", who accidentally killed an opponent in the ring. He uses this knowledge to blackmail Max into falsely claiming that Billy bribed him. As a result, Brian cancels the agreement and reinstates Eric as his successor. Discouraged, Billy drops out, but Veronica and his former classmates convince him to return. Max later confesses the truth, and Brian allows Billy to resume the challenge. When Eric objects, Billy proposes an academic decathlon to settle the matter.

After a series of competitive events, Billy takes a narrow lead. In the final round—a Jeopardy!-style quiz—Eric selects "reflections of society in literature" for Billy's final category. Billy fumbles his answer but selects "business ethics" for Eric's final category. Unable to respond, Eric suffers a breakdown, pulls a gun on Billy, and is stopped by Max, who dons his Revolting Blob costume. Eric then attempts to harm Veronica but is shot by Danny McGrath, a former classmate Billy once bullied and later apologized to.

At graduation, Billy announces that he will not take over Madison Hotels, but instead, he entrusts the company to loyal operations manager Carl Alphonse. Billy expresses his desire to go to college and pursue a teaching career, while a defeated and injured Eric watches in frustration.

== Cast ==
- Adam Sandler as Billy Madison
- Bradley Whitford as Eric Gordon
- Josh Mostel as Principal Max Anderson
- Bridgette Wilson as Veronica Vaughn
- Norm Macdonald as Frank
- Darren McGavin as Brian Madison
- Mark Beltzman as Jack
- Larry Hankin as Carl Alphonse
- Theresa Merritt as Juanita
- Dina Platias as Ms. Lippy
- Jim Downey as Principal/Judge of the decathlon
- Hrant Alianak as Pete
- Robert Smigel as Mr. Oblaski
- Amos Crawley as Rod
- Steve Buscemi as Danny McGrath (uncredited)
- Chris Farley as Bus Driver (uncredited)

== Production ==
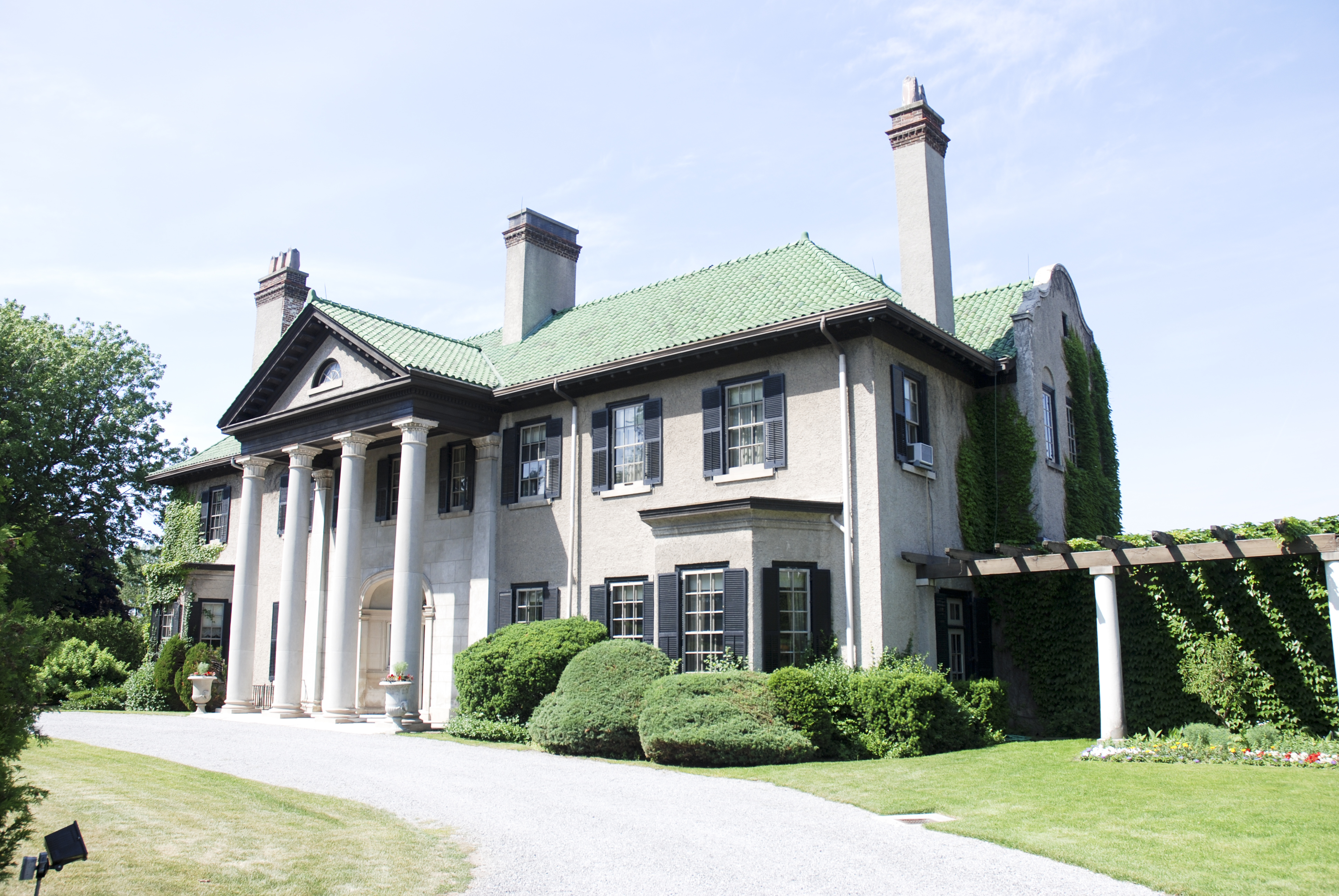
Parkwood Estate in Oshawa, Ontario, served as the exterior location for Billy's mansion in the film.

Principal photography for Billy Madison took place from June 26 to August 29, 1994, in and around Toronto, Ontario, Canada. Adam Sandler initially convinced Universal Pictures to hire Stephen Kessler as director; however, after three days of filming, Universal expressed dissatisfaction with the footage and replaced him with Tamra Davis, who had originally been the studio's top choice for the role.

Several notable locations in Ontario were used for filming. The exterior and grounds of Madison's mansion were shot at the Parkwood Estate in Oshawa, while interior scenes were filmed at Casa Loma in Toronto. The mansion's entrance was filmed at the Marylake Augustinian Monastery in King City.

During an appearance on Norm Macdonald Live, Sandler revealed that the role of Jack was originally intended for Allen Covert. Sandler also lobbied for Bob Odenkirk, a former Saturday Night Live colleague, to play the antagonist Eric Gordon, but the studio declined, as Odenkirk was not yet considered a serious actor. Sandler then suggested Philip Seymour Hoffman, who auditioned, but ultimately turned down the role. The part was eventually given to Bradley Whitford. For his role as the overworked and erratic bus driver, Chris Farley reportedly drank six shots of espresso before filming his scene.

Director Davis says she was told by Sandler before the filming of the dodgeball scene that he planned to throw the balls hard and genuinely hurt the children. He did so, with parental permission, and she described the resulting scene as "a full-on assault" adding that every shot needed to be cut because the children were crying.

== Reception ==
=== Critical response ===
On the film review aggregation site Rotten Tomatoes, the film holds an approval rating of 40% based on 52 reviews, with an average rating of 4.8/10. The website's critical consensus reads, "Audiences who enjoy Adam Sandler's belligerent comic energy may find him in joyously obnoxious form as Billy Madison, but this thinly-plotted starring vehicle surrounds its star with an aggressively pedestrian movie." On Metacritic, the film received a weighted average score of 16 out of 100, based on 13 critics, indicating "overwhelming dislike".

Richard Schickel panned the film, calling it "one of the most execrable movies ever made". Peter Rainer of the Los Angeles Times commented; "Sandler has a bad habit of thinking he is funnier than we do". On At the Movies, Gene Siskel and Roger Ebert both gave the film thumbs down, and Roger Ebert said of Sandler, "... Not an attractive screen presence. He might have a career as a villain or as a fall guy or the butt of a joke, but as the protagonist his problem is that he recreates the fingernails on the blackboard syndrome." Gene Siskel added "... you don't have a good motivation for the character's behavior". Owen Gleiberman also panned the film, saying "By the end, you feel like a drill sergeant — you want to wipe that stupid grin off Sandler's face". Rita Kempley of The Washington Post said the film was trying to be "A more kid-friendly version of 'Dumb and Dumber.' And there's even a moral: 'Yahoo for education,' though the movie doesn't really put any muscle behind it."

Janet Maslin of The New York Times gave the film a mixed review, saying "It succeeds as a reasonably smart no-brainer. If you've ever had a yearning to relive the third grade, this must be the next best thing." Brian Lowry of Variety also gave the film a mixed review, saying "There are a few bursts of sheer, irresistible idiocy — along the lines of 'Wayne's World' or even 'Pee-wee's Big Adventure' — but not enough to sustain the more arid stretches."

Billy Mowbray of Film4 gave the film a positive review, writing: "When you get that Sandler's comedic persona is meant to be annoying, like Beavis and Butt-Head or Cartman, the laughs come thick and fast". Kevin N. Laforest said, "Okay, the plot is inane, but it's the basis of a series of really funny scenes."

=== Award nominations ===
At the 1995 MTV Movie Awards, Adam Sandler earned a nomination for Best Comedic Performance.
