= Sadie Sandler =

American actress (born 2006)

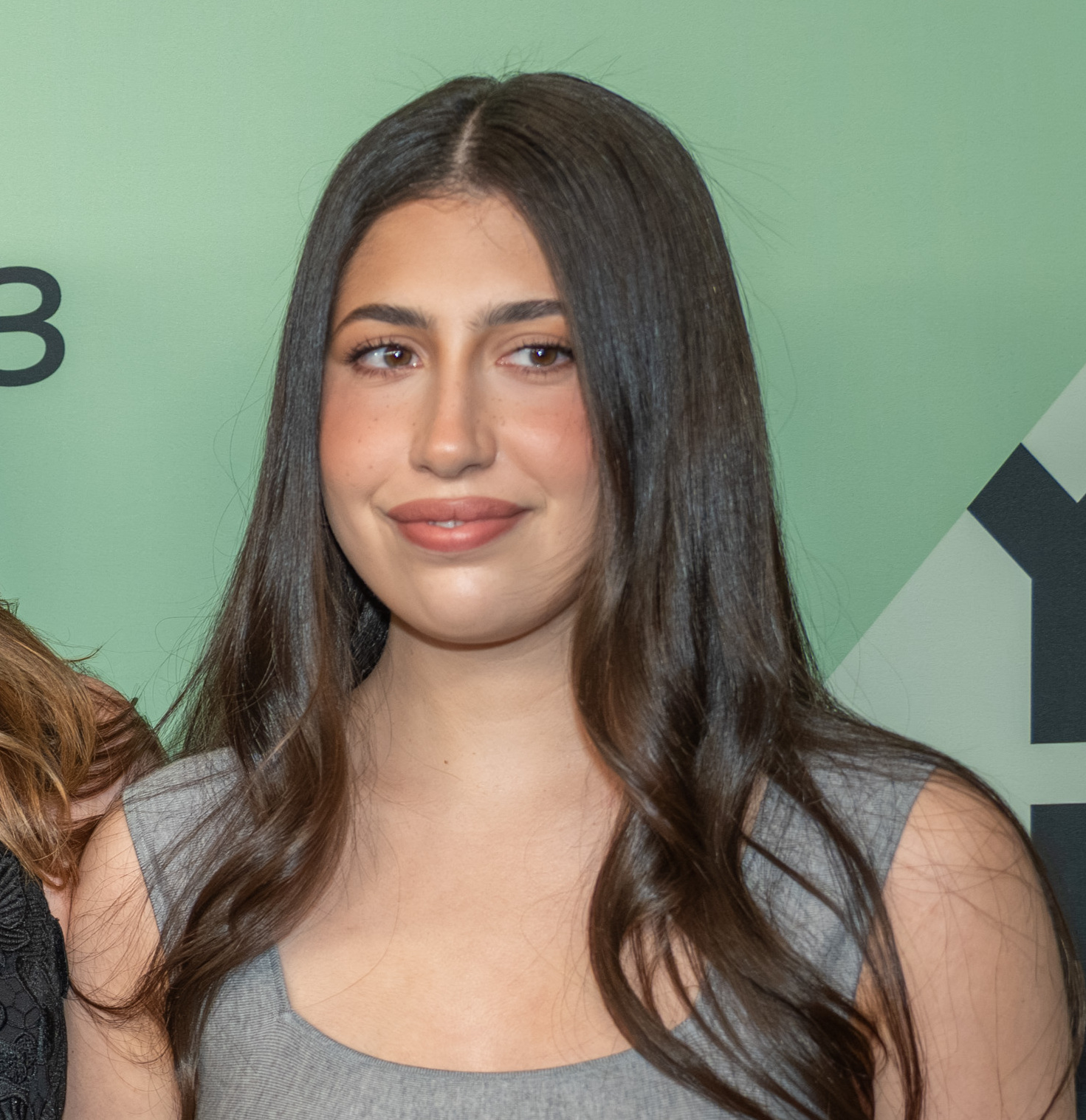
- Sandler in 2025
- Born: Sadie Madison Sandler; May 6, 2006 (age 20); Los Angeles, California, U.S.
- Occupation: Actress
- Years active: 2008–present
- Parent(s): Adam Sandler (father); Jackie Sandler (mother)
- Relatives: Sunny Sandler (sister); Joseph H. Titone (grandfather)

Sadie Madison Sandler (born May 6, 2006) is an American actress. She is the eldest daughter of actor and comedian Adam Sandler. She began appearing in films as a child, primarily in Happy Madison productions, and later gained recognition for her performances in You Are So Not Invited to My Bat Mitzvah (2023), Happy Gilmore 2 (2025) and Roommates (2026).

== Early life ==
Sadie Madison Sandler was born on May 6, 2006, in Los Angeles, to actor Adam Sandler and actress Jackie Sandler. She is of Jewish heritage on her father's side and Italian heritage on her mother's side. She grew up in an entertainment-focused household. Her younger sister, Sunny Sandler, is also an actress. Sadie began acting in films produced by her father while still a child.

Sandler had her bat mitzvah in 2019 with performances by Maroon 5's Adam Levine and James Valentine.

== Career ==
Sadie Sandler made her first film appearance in You Don't Mess with the Zohan (2008). She had small roles in multiple Happy Madison productions including Bedtime Stories (2008), Grown Ups (2010), Just Go with It (2011), Jack and Jill (2011). She is also in the animated film Hotel Transylvania (2012) and its sequels, Hotel Transylvania 2 (2015) and Hotel Transylvania 3: Summer Vacation (2017). In 2023, Sandler appeared as Ronnie Friedman in the Netflix comedy You Are So Not Invited to My Bat Mitzvah, based on the novel by Fiona Rosenbloom. The film, which starred her sister Sunny in the lead role, received positive reviews and marked a notable performance in Sadie's acting career.

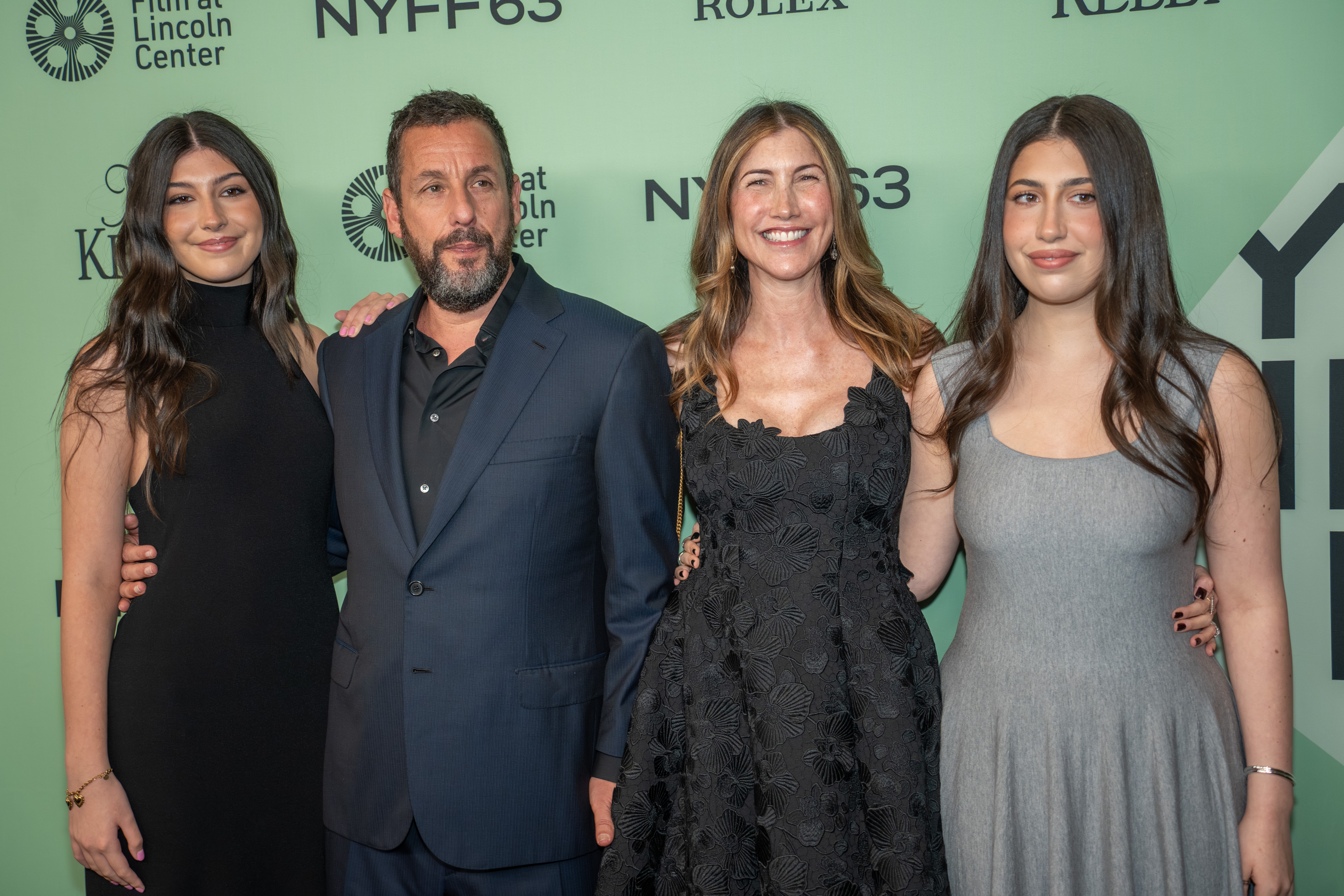
From L to R: Sunny, Adam, Jackie, and Sadie Sandler at the 63rd annual New York Film Festival at Lincoln Center in 2025 for the film Jay Kelly.

She starred as Charlotte in Happy Gilmore 2 (2025), a sequel to her father's 1996 sports comedy Happy Gilmore. The film was released on Netflix and featured several members of the Sandler family. Sadie’s performance received praise from director Kyle Newacheck and media outlets for her comedic timing and evolving screen presence.

== Filmography ==
| Year | Title | Role | Notes |
|---|---|---|---|
| 2008 | You Don't Mess with the Zohan | Girl riding on goat | Uncredited |
| 2008 | Bedtime Stories | Sweetest Medieval Girl of All Time | |
| 2010 | Grown Ups | Tardio's daughter | |
| 2011 | Just Go with It | Hawaiian girl at Rope Bridge | |
| 2011 | Jack and Jill | Little Girl on Ship | |
| 2012 | That's My Boy | Lemonade Stand Kid | |
| 2012 | Hotel Transylvania | Winnie/Young Mavis (voices) | Voice roles |
| 2013 | Grown Ups 2 | Sadie Tardio | |
| 2014 | Blended | Little League Announcer | |
| 2015 | Pixels | Lemonadie Sadie | |
| 2015 | Hotel Transylvania 2 | Winnie (voice) | Voice role |
| 2015 | The Ridiculous 6 | Dancing Kid #1 | |
| 2016 | The Do-Over | Lou's Daughter Sally | |
| 2017 | Sandy Wexler | Jesse | |
| 2018 | The Week Of | Sammy the Bored Baseball Girl | |
| 2018 | Hotel Transylvania 3: Summer Vacation | Winnie (voice) | Voice role |
| 2019 | Murder Mystery | Summer | |
| 2020 | The Wrong Missy | Lobby Strong Sadie | |
| 2020 | Hubie Halloween | Danielle | |
| 2023 | You Are So Not Invited to My Bat Mitzvah | Ronnie Friedman | |
| 2023 | Leo | Jayda (voice) | Voice role |
| 2025 | Happy Gilmore 2 | Charlotte | |
| 2025 | Jay Kelly | Vivienne Sukenick | |
| 2026 | Roommates | Devon | |
| 2026 | Nobody Wants This | Denise Charles | |
