= Tim Herlihy =

American actor, film producer and screenwriter (born 1966)

- Born: Timothy Patrick Herlihy; October 9, 1966 (age 59); Brooklyn, New York, U.S.
- Education: New York University (BS, JD)
- Occupations: Screenwriter; actor; film producer; comedian; playwright
- Years active: 1994–present
- Children: 4, including Martin

Timothy Patrick Herlihy (born October 9, 1966) is an American actor, comedian, screenwriter, producer, and playwright.

Films written or produced by Herlihy have grossed over $3 billion at the worldwide box office. He frequently collaborates with Adam Sandler, who played a Saturday Night Live character, "The Herlihy Boy", in honor of him.

== Early life and education ==
Herlihy was born in Brooklyn, New York, and raised in Poughkeepsie, New York. His father was a New York City firefighter. He graduated from Arlington High School in 1984.

While majoring in accounting and international business at New York University, he roomed with Adam Sandler in the Brittany Hall dormitory. When Sandler began doing stand-up comedy during their sophomore year, Herlihy wrote material for him.

After graduating in 1988, Herlihy spent a year as an accountant at Ernst & Young in Manhattan before attending the New York University School of Law. Herlihy continued to collaborate with Sandler, who had recently been hired at Saturday Night Live. After law school, Herlihy worked as a securities lawyer at Cahill Gordon & Reindel in Lower Manhattan.

== Career ==
While working as an attorney, Herlihy continued collaborating with Sandler on SNL sketches, including Canteen Boy. They also began working on a screenplay for Billy Madison, which Herlihy wrote at his law firm late at night.

Herlihy was hired as a writer at Saturday Night Live in March 1994. He remained at the show after Sandler left in 1995 (being one of five writers to return the next season), eventually rising to head writer and eventually producer. He wrote many political sketches leading up to the 1996 presidential election, and co-wrote (with Tina Fey) the 1999 sketch in which Monica Lewinsky appeared. He left the show in 1999 to focus on film work.

He wrote or co-wrote the Sandler films Billy Madison (1995), Happy Gilmore (1996), The Wedding Singer (1998), The Waterboy (1998), Big Daddy (1999) and Pixels (2015).

In 1999, Herlihy appeared in the film Big Daddy as the "Singing Kangaroo," and sang "The Kangaroo Song" on the film's soundtrack.

Herlihy played a bartender in both The Wedding Singer (1998) and The Ridiculous 6 (2015).

Herlihy has written for and or performed on three of Sandler's comedy albums: They're All Gonna Laugh at You! (1993), What the Hell Happened to Me? (1996) and Shhh...Don't Tell (2004).

In 2006, Herlihy co-wrote the book and two songs for a Broadway musical version of The Wedding Singer. It opened at the Al Hirschfeld Theatre on April 27, 2006, and closed on December 31, 2006, after 284 performances. Herlihy's and Chad Beguelin's book was nominated for the 2006 Tony Award for Best Book of a Musical, and the show itself was nominated for the Tony Award for Best Musical. It subsequently has had many international productions.

In 2015, Herlihy co-wrote (with Sandler) the Western comedy film The Ridiculous 6, distributed by Netflix. Despite being universally panned by critics, on January 6, 2016, it was announced by Netflix that the film had been viewed more times in 30 days than any other movie in Netflix history.

Herlihy returned to Saturday Night Live for one episode in 2015, to work with Tracy Morgan on a recurring sketch they had created in the 1990s, Brian Fellow's Safari Planet. The episode was nominated for an Emmy Award for outstanding writing, and won a Writers Guild Award for Outstanding Writing for a Comedy/Variety sketch series.

== Personal life ==
Herlihy's son, Martin, also attended New York University. Martin used to write for Saturday Night Live as part of the comedy trio Please Don't Destroy, which also includes John Higgins, the son of Saturday Night Live writer Steve Higgins.

== Filmography ==
=== Writer ===
- Saturday Night Live (1994–1999)
- Billy Madison (1995) - Written by (with Adam Sandler)
- Happy Gilmore (1996) - Written by (with Sandler)
- The Wedding Singer (1998) - Written by
- The Waterboy (1998) - Written by (with Sandler)
- Big Daddy (1999) - Screenplay by (with Steve Franks and Sandler)
- Little Nicky (2000) - Written by (with Steven Brill and Sandler)
- Mr. Deeds (2002) - Screenplay by (Based on Mr. Deeds Goes to Town and Opera Hat by Clarence Budington Kelland)
- Bedtime Stories (2008) - Screenplay (with Matt Lopez)
- Grown Ups 2 (2013) - Written by (with Fred Wolf and Sandler)
- Pixels (2015) - Screen Story by, Screenplay (with Timothy Dowling) (Based on Pixels)
- The Ridiculous 6 (2015) - Written (with Sandler)
- Hubie Halloween (2020) - Written by (with Sandler)
- Happy Gilmore 2 (2025) - Written by (with Sandler)
- Grown Ups 3 (TBA) - Written by (with Sandler)

=== Actor ===
- Billy Madison (1995) as Architect
- The Wedding Singer (1998) as Rudy the Bartender
- Big Daddy (1999) as Singing Kangaroo
- Mr. Deeds (2002) as Fireman
- Click (2006) as Doctor
- Grown Ups (2010) as Pastor
- Blended (2014) as Basketball Dad
- Pixels (2015) as Defense Secretary
- The Ridiculous 6 (2015) as Nugget Bartender
- Sandy Wexler (2017) as Mr. O'Mally
- Hubie Halloween (2020) as Wild Bear
- Happy Gilmore 2 (2025) as Dr. Hertz

=== Producer ===
- Saturday Night Live (1997–1999)
- You Are So Not Invited to My Bat Mitzvah (2023)
- Kinda Pregnant (2025)
- Happy Gilmore 2 (2025)
- Roommates (2026)

=== Executive producer ===
- Anger Management (2003)
- The Longest Yard (2005)
- Click (2006)
- Grown Ups (2010)
- Just Go with It (2011)
- Jack and Jill (2011)
- That's My Boy (2012)
- Blended (2014)
- Pixels (2015)
- The Ridiculous 6 (2015)
- The Do-Over (2016)
- Sandy Wexler (2017)
- The Week Of (2018)
- Hubie Halloween (2020)
- Murder Mystery 2 (2023)

=== Soundtrack ===
- Billy Madison (1995) (writer: "The Billy Madison Way")
- The Wedding Singer (1998) (writer: "Somebody Kill Me", "Grow Old with You")
- Big Daddy (1999) (performer: "The Kangaroo Song")
- 50 First Dates (2004) (writer: "Forgetful Lucy")
- My Only Ü (2008) (writer: "Kasama Kang Tumanda")
- Blended (2014) (writer: "Welcome To Africa", "Exciting, Amazing, Romantic", "You Suck", "Finally Blending", "Blending & Bonding", "Look They're Blending")
- The Ridiculous 6 (2015) (lyricist: "My Baby's Biscuits", "Yippee Yo Yo Yay")

== Broadway ==
- The Wedding Singer (2006) (writer/producer)
