= Night Comes =

- Directed by: Jay Hernandez
- Written by: Jay Hernandez; Jason Bourque; Nancy Isaak
- Produced by: Shaun Redick; Yvette Yates; Jayce Barriero; Jacky Lai
- Starring: Dafne Keen; Samantha Lorraine; Alexander Ludwig
- Cinematography: Milan Chadima
- Music by: Edo Van Breemen; Johannes Winkler
- Production companies: Big Picture Cinema Group; Impossible Dream Entertainment; Gold Star Productions
- Countries: Canada; United States
- Language: English

Night Comes is an upcoming horror film co-written and directed by Jay Hernandez. It stars Dafne Keen, Samantha Lorraine, and Alexander Ludwig.

== Cast ==
- Dafne Keen
- Samantha Lorraine
- Alexander Ludwig

== Production ==
In May 2024, it was announced that Jay Hernandez would be making his feature film directorial debut for a new horror film, starring Dafne Keen and Samantha Lorraine. In August 2024, Alexander Ludwig joined the cast. Principal photography began on September 16, 2024, in Vancouver, and wrapped in November.
