= Hubie Halloween =

2020 American comedy film

- Official poster
- Directed by: Steven Brill
- Written by: Tim Herlihy; Adam Sandler
- Produced by: Adam Sandler; Kevin Grady; Allen Covert
- Starring: Adam Sandler; Kevin James; Julie Bowen; Ray Liotta; Rob Schneider; June Squibb; Kenan Thompson; Shaquille O'Neal; Steve Buscemi; Tim Meadows; Maya Rudolph; Ben Stiller
- Cinematography: Seamus Tierney
- Edited by: Tom Costain; Brian Robinson; J.J. Titone
- Music by: Rupert Gregson-Williams
- Production company: Happy Madison Productions
- Distributed by: Netflix
- Release date: October 7, 2020
- Running time: 102 minutes
- Country: United States
- Language: English

Hubie Halloween is a 2020 American horror comedy mystery film directed by Steve Brill, co-written by Tim Herlihy and Adam Sandler, and features an ensemble cast consisting of Sandler in the title role, Kevin James, Julie Bowen, Ray Liotta, Rob Schneider, June Squibb, Kenan Thompson, Shaquille O'Neal, Steve Buscemi, Tim Meadows, Maya Rudolph, and Ben Stiller, with the latter reprising his role from Happy Gilmore (1996). The film follows a Halloween-loving delicatessen worker who must save the town of Salem, Massachusetts, from a kidnapper as various hijinks occur.

Released on October 7, 2020, by Netflix, the film received mixed reviews from critics, although some critics considered it better than Sandler's other recent comedies. It pays tribute to actor Cameron Boyce, who was set to co-star, but died in 2019 due to epilepsy. His Jessie co-star, Karan Brar, appeared in the intended role instead.

== Plot ==
In Salem, Massachusetts, Hubert "Hubie" Dubois, a delicatessen employee, is bullied by most of the city, and the victim of many practical jokes. He has annoyed police sergeants Steve Downey and Blake, and Father Dave for ages. Hubie spends his Halloween monitoring the city as the official Halloween Helper.

The day before Halloween, Hubie meets his strange new neighbor Walter Lambert, and news spreads around town about Richie Hartman, a convict and childhood friend of Hubie who has absconded from a local mental institution.

On Halloween day Hubie, working as Halloween Monitor, investigates Walter's home after hearing strange noises. Reporting this to the police, he is "recruited" by Downey as an "AUU" (auxiliary undercover unit). Hubie believes this assignment is genuine, but it is really just something Steve tells him as a distraction, hoping it keeps him out of the way.

Hubie goes to a local Halloween party to monitor the activities, however, it soon turns sour. He is tricked into going into a corn maze seeking a lost child. Hubie's young co-worker Mike follows hoping to scare Hubie. He finds Mike and watches him get pulled into the maze and then disappear.

Hubie moves his attention to a drive-in cinema, where his old classmates Lester and Mary Hennessey scare him. They falsely report suspicious activity in one of the cars (who turn out to be trick-or-treaters driven by Mr. Hennessey to throw eggs at Hubie). Hubie flees into the woods and finds Walter, who thinks he is turning into a werewolf. He chases Hubie to a haunted house organized by local teens to raise money and overseen by Chantal Taylor. Mr. and Mrs. Hennessey are kidnapped and Sgt. Downey is alerted.

At the haunted house, Hubie sees a male Siberian Husky, believing he is Walter in his final form. The dog defecates and eats his own feces while Hubie attempts to interrogate and confront him. It runs into the haunted house so he chases him inside. It is eventually shown that the Husky is Miss Taylor's dog Buster. Pete Landolfa goes in to scare Hubie, but is kidnapped right in front of him.

Sgt. Downey arrives and suggests to Mayor Benson that they cancel Halloween. Hubie thinks it is Walter, but then Blake calls Downey. Walter has been at the police station with Richie, as they had turned themselves in. Walter's real name is Nick Hudson and Richie had escaped to convince him to return to the mental institution, which they refer to as the werewolf treatment center. Downey, Benson, and Dave believe that Hubie is behind the disappearances, getting revenge on his bullies. He runs away and goes to the radio station.

DJ Aurora tells Hubie that someone calls a lot more than him always requesting a song for Hubie. They all think Violet Valentine, Sgt. Downey's ex-wife and Hubie's love interest since his childhood, is the caller. The planted burner phone rings, revealing it to be in Hubie's house. Hubie races there, hoping his mother is okay.

Hubie arrives to discover his mother is the kidnapper, having taken Pete, Mike, and the Hennesseys as revenge for tormenting Hubie, and plans to burn them alive. He rescues them just as the police, news media, Nick, and Richie arrive, but they are still ungrateful. His mother then scolds them all for the things they did to Hubie and they admit that they were jealous of him for various reasons. Hubie's mother suddenly disappears upon using the Frankenstein trick.

One year later, Hubie is married to Violet, is the new mayor of Salem, and his new three foster kids Tommy, Danielle & Cooky are going trick or treating dressed like people they know. Having earned respect from the locals, Hubie goes into town on his bicycle with Downey escorting him and prepares for the Halloween festivities.

== Cast ==
- Adam Sandler as Hubie Dubois, a delicatessen employee.
- Kevin James as Sergeant Steve Downey, a police sergeant constantly bothered by Hubie.
- Julie Bowen as Violet Valentine, Hubie's love interest and Sgt. Downey's ex-wife.
- Ray Liotta as Pete Landolfa, a rude man who recently lost his father and is one of Hubie's tormentors.
- Rob Schneider as Richie Hartman, Hubie's childhood friend and a convict with severe bladder issues who escaped from a mental institution to get his roommate back there before he gets into trouble.
- June Squibb as Mrs. Estelle Dubois, Hubie's mother
- Kenan Thompson as Sergeant Blake, a police sergeant working under Steve Downey.
- Shaquille O'Neal as DJ Aurora, a radio host with a feminine voice.
  - Vivian Nixon as the voice of DJ Aurora
- Steve Buscemi as "Walter Lambert" / Nick Hudson, Hubie's new neighbor who believes himself to be a 359-year-old werewolf.
- Maya Rudolph as Mary Hennessey, one of Hubie's old classmates who often pranks him.
- Michael Chiklis as Father Dave, Salem's resident priest who is often annoyed with Hubie's antics.
- Tim Meadows as Lester Hennessey, Mary's husband and one of Hubie's old classmates who assists his wife in pranking Hubie. Meadows had to wear a full bald cap to make himself look completely bald.
- Karan Brar as Mike Mundi, Hubie's teenage co-worker who often torments Hubie. This role was meant for Cameron Boyce, but he died before production started.
- George Wallace as Mayor Benson, the mayor of Salem.
- Paris Berelc as Megan McNally, a girl who is Tommy's dream girl.
- Noah Schnapp as Tommy, Violet's foster son.
- China Anne McClain as Chantal Taylor, an elementary school teacher who owns a Siberian Husky named Buster.
- Colin Quinn as a janitor
- Kym Whitley as Louise, a local farmer.
- Lavell Crawford as Dave, a local farmer and Louise's husband.
- Mikey Day as Axehead, a haunted house employee alongside Peggy.
- Blake Clark as Tayback, a cook.
- Tyler Crumley as Adam O'Doyle, a boy who frequently bullies Hubie with his friends.
- Peyton List as Peggy, a haunted house owner trying to raise money for her school.
- Jake McDorman as a background character seen mysteriously on screen in 3 different scenes.
- Ben Stiller as Hal L., an abusive orderly at Richie and Nick's asylum. Stiller reprises his role from Happy Gilmore where he used to work at a retirement home.

Additionally, Dan Patrick plays the principal of the local elementary school. Melissa Villaseñor plays Karen, a cat owner in Hubie's neighborhood. WHDH morning anchor Alaina Pinto plays Salem's resident news anchor. Betsy Sodaro plays Bunny, Aurora's wife with a masculine voice provided by an uncredited actor. Kelli Berglund, Kevin Quinn, Bradley Steven Perry, Lilimar and Amber Frank the Pennywise guy, Cormac, Coco and a female zombie band singer.

Adam Sandler's wife, Jackie Sandler, plays Tracy Phillips, a local news reporter, while their daughters Sadie and Sunny Sandler, play Violet's foster daughters Danielle and Cooky. Adam Sandler's nephew, Jared Sandler, plays a male zombie band singer. Tim Herlihy, the film's screenwriter, plays a Wild Bear while his son Martin Herlihy plays a teenage zombie. Nathan and Ethan Brill, the children of director Steven Brill, play two food fight kids. Allen Covert, the film's producer, plays a zombie movie dad while his kids, Hannah, Abigail, Rebecca, and Hank Covert, play Danielle and Cooky's friends and two food fight kids. Kannon James, the son of Kevin James, plays an "Exorcist costume kid" while Sienna, Shea and Sistine, James' daughters, play more of Danielle and Cooky's friends. Ben Stiller's daughter Ella Olivia Stiller and Ray Liotta's daughter Karsen Liotta play teenagers Lexie and Barb, respectively.

== Production ==
In July 2019, Hubie Halloween was announced as Adam Sandler's next film as part of his Netflix deal, with Happy Madison regulars Kevin James, Julie Bowen, Maya Rudolph, Steve Buscemi, Rob Schneider, Tim Meadows, Colin Quinn, Blake Clark and Shaquille O'Neal as part of the cast. Ray Liotta, Michael Chiklis, Kenan Thompson, Peyton List, China Anne McClain, Paris Berelc, June Squibb, Noah Schnapp, Mikey Day, Melissa Villaseñor, Kym Whitley, Lavell Crawford, Betsy Sodaro, and George Wallace were also attached, with Steve Brill directing from a screenplay by Sandler and Tim Herlihy. Cameron Boyce, who had starred alongside Sandler in the Grown Ups series, was set to appear in the film, but he died in July 2019 from complications of epilepsy just days before shooting. Boyce's close friend and former Jessie co-star Karan Brar was then recast in his role. The film is dedicated in Boyce's memory.

Principal photography began in July 2019 around Salem, Lynnfield, Hamilton, Marblehead, Danvers, Tewksbury and other parts of Massachusetts, wrapping in early September.

== Release ==
Hubie Halloween was digitally released by Netflix on October 7, 2020. It was the top-streamed title in its first two weeks of release. It finished third in its third weekend, then over Halloween weekend placed sixth.

== Reception ==
On Rotten Tomatoes, the film has an approval rating of 52% based on 85 reviews with an average rating of 5.1/10. The website's critics consensus reads "Viewers immune to its star's charms won't find it much of a treat, but Hubie Halloween is sweet enough to satisfy fans of Adam Sandler's antics." On Metacritic it has a weighted average score of 53 out of 100, based on reviews from 19 critics, indicating "mixed or average" reviews.

David Ehrlich of IndieWire gave the film a "B–," praising the cameos and saying, "Are those details enough to make Hubie Halloween much better than all the other content Sandler has churned out for Netflix so far, or am I just drunk on the movie's pumpkin-spiced production design? It's hard to say, but this is the first time in a long time that it feels nice to watch the Sandman goof off with his friends for 90 minutes."

For the 41st Golden Raspberry Awards, Hubie Halloween received three nominations for Worst Actor (for Sandler), Worst Screen Combo (for "Sandler and His Grating Simpleton Voice"), and Worst Prequel, Remake, Rip-off or Sequel (for a "Remake/Rip-Off of Ernest Scared Stupid").

=== Accolades ===
Award	Date of ceremony	Category	Recipients	Result	Ref.
Nickelodeon Kids' Choice Awards	March 13, 2021	Favorite Movie	Hubie Halloween	Nominated	
Nickelodeon Kids' Choice Awards	March 13, 2021	Favorite Movie Actor	Adam Sandler	Nominated	
Golden Raspberry Awards	April 24, 2021	Worst Actor	Adam Sandler	Nominated	
Golden Raspberry Awards	April 24, 2021	Worst Screen Combo	Adam Sandler and his grating simpleton voice	Nominated	
Golden Raspberry Awards	April 24, 2021	Worst Prequel, Remake, Rip-off or Sequel	Hubie Halloween (rip-off of Ernest Scared Stupid)	Nominated	

== See also ==
- List of films set around Halloween
