= Dora and the Search for Sol Dorado =

2025 film by Alberto Belli

- Promotional release poster
- Directed by: Alberto Belli
- Screenplay by: JT Billings
- Based on: Dora the Explorer by: Chris Gifford; Valerie Walsh Valdes; Eric Weiner
- Produced by: Kristin Burr; Benjamin Tappan; Carolina Arciniegas
- Starring: Samantha Lorraine; Jacob Rodriguez; Mariana Garzón Toro; Acston Luca Porto; Christian Gnecco Quintero; Gabriel Iglesias; Daniella Pineda
- Cinematography: Federico Cantini
- Edited by: Evan Ahlgren
- Music by: Kenny Wood
- Production companies: Nickelodeon Movies; Walsh Valdés Productions
- Distributed by: Nickelodeon; Paramount+
- Release date: July 2, 2025
- Running time: 96 minutes
- Country: United States
- Languages: English; Spanish

Dora and the Search for Sol Dorado (Note: lit. 'Golden Sun' in Spanish) is a 2025 American adventure film directed by Alberto Belli and written by JT Billings. It is the second live-action film based on the Dora the Explorer franchise, and adds the elements of action comedy genre. It stars Samantha Lorraine, Jacob Rodriguez, Mariana Garzón Toro, Acston Luca Porto, Christian Gnecco Quintero, Gabriel Iglesias, and Daniella Pineda. The film recreates the characters by rebooting the story of an explorer named Dora and her cousin Diego, who are in search of an ancient magical fallen star through a jungle, while facing an archaeologist with the same mission.

After about two years of development, filming began in July 2024 took place across locations in Colombia, including jungle, theme parks, and studio, for four months. The film was released simultaneously on Paramount+ and Nickelodeon on July 2, 2025, to generally positive reviews.

== Plot ==
Ten years earlier, Dora and Diego's grandfather used to tell them Incan stories. He told about Sol Dorado, a fallen magical star that has the power to grant a selfless wish. Dora was given the Map, which she believes guides her on adventures, and loves to explore the Amazon rainforest with Diego. She rescued a monkey and named him Boots.

Presently, Dora is on another adventure to search for Sol Dorado. Despite being resistant, Diego joins only for the last adventure. Inside a cave, she interprets a quipu leading to an ancient sundial. However, a booby trap sets off a fire in the cave. Diego activates his Rescue Pack to save Dora, who eventually loses her Map in the fire. Heartbroken, Dora assumes she is nothing without the Map, before she is diverted by the Jungle World's new manager, Camila, whom Dora had admired for years.

At Jungle World, Dora becomes a guide on the ride with annoyingly scripted puns, where Diego holds the show of his cockatoo, Mango. There, they discover that Camila is searching the Emperor's Bracelet, the key to Sol Dorado. Diego calls this a myth, but Dora sneaks into Tesoro Inca (Note: lit. 'Incan Treasure' in Spanish, depicted as a museum in the film) and unlocks a box using the sundial, from which the bracelet binds to her hand and gives her a vision of three entrances toward Sol Dorado. Camila finds the box empty, suspects Dora of theft, and commands her men to stop Dora from escaping, but the bracelet helps Dora avoid them. On the tram, Dora discovers that Diego had a girlfriend, Naiya, who is driving them during the escape and encounter with the henchmen. Eventually, they crash in the middle of the jungle, potentially leaving Camila behind.

From her Backpack, Dora gives Diego his Rescue Pack and Naiya a medical kit to continue their adventure. Dora has a vision of the first location, El Gran Valle de la Muerte, (Note: lit. 'The Great Valley of Death' in Spanish, depicted as a tomb in the film) and tries leading the way on her own and with the help of Boots. There, after deciphering a quipu, they find a lead into the graves before the walls could crush them. Eventually, they get a clue toward the Macaws of Cinchona, through another vision Dora gets for the second location. At night, Swiper the Fox traces the group and swipes away Dora's Backpack, making the track easier for his owner, Camila.

Dora wakes up heartbroken over losing the Backpack, so Diego calls off the mission before the bracelet binds him back. He opens up about his opportunity for an internship that led to his unwillingness to co-explore. Moving on to the location, a math puzzle guides them through a set of quipu swings. While Naiya, a sudoku player, solves the puzzle, Diego swings over spikes below to unlock the bridge leading them to another clue. Dora has an emotional breakdown over not wanting to lose Diego, so he comforts her and gets a vision of the third location, the Temple of Light. Outside, Camila captures the group and follows the tipline, while Dora falls off the cliff during the encounter.

Dora regains consciousness under the full moon and discovers she is the actual map herself. She reads the stars to find the exact way, activates the Rescue Pack against Camila's group, and uses the sundial to open the Temple. However, Camila tailgates Dora's group and opens up about her career failure, which led her to selfishly search for Sol Dorado.

Inside, Dora and Camila decode the quipu together, leading them to weigh the gold on the scales to open the gateway ahead in return. There was not enough gold for the last scale, so Camila sacrifices herself to open the gateway before the bracelet rescues her. They connect the third clue, and Camila opens the Sol Dorado using the bracelet as the key. Camila and Dora commit to having found their true selves, the Crusader and the Explorer, respectively, so they selflessly use the wish to prevent Diego from losing his internship.

Diego and Naiya reconcile during the adventure and vow to stay connected. Diego bids farewell before leaving for New York City. Dora finally sees the green flash as Diego gives her the new Map, prompting another adventure.

== Cast and characters ==
- Samantha Lorraine as Dora Márquez
  While the character stops frequently breaking the fourth wall, Lorraine explained her version of Dora to be more "smart" and "quick-witted", who would go through low times in her life and lose her important things, before finding her true inner-self. She does not like to sing much and instead uses catchphrases, unlike previous versions of Dora. At the age of 16, she still sees the world as an adventure.
  - Scarlett Spears as Young Dora
- Jacob Rodriguez as Diego Márquez
  More involved with Dora, this version of Diego is presented as more nervous and risk-averse. At the age of 17, he transitioned into the real world by getting a job. Having grown up together, Dora wants to spend more time with Diego, so he hesitates in sharing his life goals with her. The Sol Dorado wish is finally used for him, so he can visit New York City for an internship in the College of Zoology to pursue his own adventure.
  - Tiago Martinez as Young Diego
- Mariana Garzón Toro as Naiya, Diego's girlfriend
  She is introduced in a phase where she had lost interest in her work-life and love-life. It is, however, changed after she had a satisfactory adventure with Dora's group.
- Acston Luca Porto as Sonny, Naiya's younger brother
- Daniella Pineda as Camila, an archaeologist
  She is presented as the star of a former TV show, Camila the Crusader, whom Dora had admired, until realizing her intentions to be in opposition. She had lost her reputation after facing humiliation on live television after failing to locate a treasure. She now has a pet fox, Swiper.
- Gabriel Iglesias voices Boots, Dora's pet monkey
- María Cecilia Botero as Dora's Abuela (Note: lit. 'grandmother' in Spanish)
- J. Santiago Suarez as Dora's Abuelo (Note: lit. 'grandfather' in Spanish)
- Jacqueline Obradors voices Mango
- Christian Gnecco Quintero as Beetle, a henchman
  His team is hired by Camila to dig out the Incan treasure and help her find the way to Sol Dorado. While he is only in greed of gold, he even tries having a sword fight with Camila as she turns away her side.
- Valentina Latyna as Sabrina Márquez, Diego's mother
- Valentina Acosta as Elena Márquez, Dora's mother
- George Slebi as Cole Márquez, Dora's father
- Óscar Roda as Nico Márquez, Diego's father

Additionally, the Map is depicted only as Dora's belief. Similarly, the Backpack and the Rescue pack also do not have subjective roles. Boots and Swiper cannot speak to depict the reality of the animals. Only Dora talks with Boots in monkey language, which is occasionally translated into English for the audience only. Similarly, Dora's group does not know how to stop Swiper because they have never interacted with him before. The film pokes fun at classic dialogues from the original series in an unusual way.

Dora misses her grandfather after his death and waits to see the green flash of light at sunset, as she believes that he will send a message through it, until she finally sees it one day. There are references to Atahualpa, the last Incan emperor, with his depiction in the film as he had left a magical bracelet. The film highlights ayllu, and shares a message to be selfless and not selfish. Dora and Diego have a secret handshake, and they can speak Quechua and interpret quipus, inspired by the ancient Inca mythology.

== Production ==
=== Development ===
The director Alberto Belli had shared a concept about the Incan ayllu with the writer JT Billings. For about two years, they were up to recreating a story in the Dora the Explorer franchise, originally created by Chris Gifford, Valerie Walsh Valdes, and Eric Weiner. It is the second film following Dora and the Lost City of Gold (2019), but is termed as a reboot of the original franchise with redefined characters. It draws inspiration from the Indiana Jones franchise, (Note: The inspiration is noted by the cast and crew, including the lead actress, the editor, and the cinematographer; as well as the reviewers, including in Variety, Decider, Music City Dive-in, ScreenRant, and United Press International.) and adds the elements of action and comedy within the adventure storyline. (Note: Genres as described by the filmmakers in interviews with Music City Dive-in, Popped News, Sony, and No Film School.)

=== Casting ===
In May 2024, the film title was revealed as Dora and the Search for Sol Dorado, with Samantha Lorraine in the eponymous role, which the filmmakers had finalized after conducting auditions in multiple countries for about two months. She is termed as the sixth Dora of the franchise. Jacob Rodriguez was cast as Dora's cousin Diego the following month, making his feature film debut. In May 2025, the roles of Mariana Garzón Toro, Acston Luca Porto, Daniella Pineda, and Gabriel Iglesias were also revealed. Iglesias shared that he was cast only on a direct phone call offer to voice the character of Dora's pet monkey, Boots.

Chelsea Ellis Bloch and Marisol Roncali served as the casting directors. In June and July 2025, the roles of further cast members were also revealed, including María Cecilia Botero, George Slebi, Óscar Rodo, J. Santiago Suarez, Jacqueline Obradors, Christian Gnecco Quintero, Valentina Latyna, Valentina Acosta, Scarlett Spears, and Tiago Martinez. Some of them were selected based on their Colombian nationality, and some made their feature film debut as well. (Note: Cast names, nationality, and debuting information are extracted from the sources such as ScreenRant, Infobae, 90.4 F.M Laud, Radionica, The Hollywood Reporter, and Variety.) María Cecilia Botero's role of Abuela is compared to her similar role in 2021 animated film Encanto.

=== Filming ===
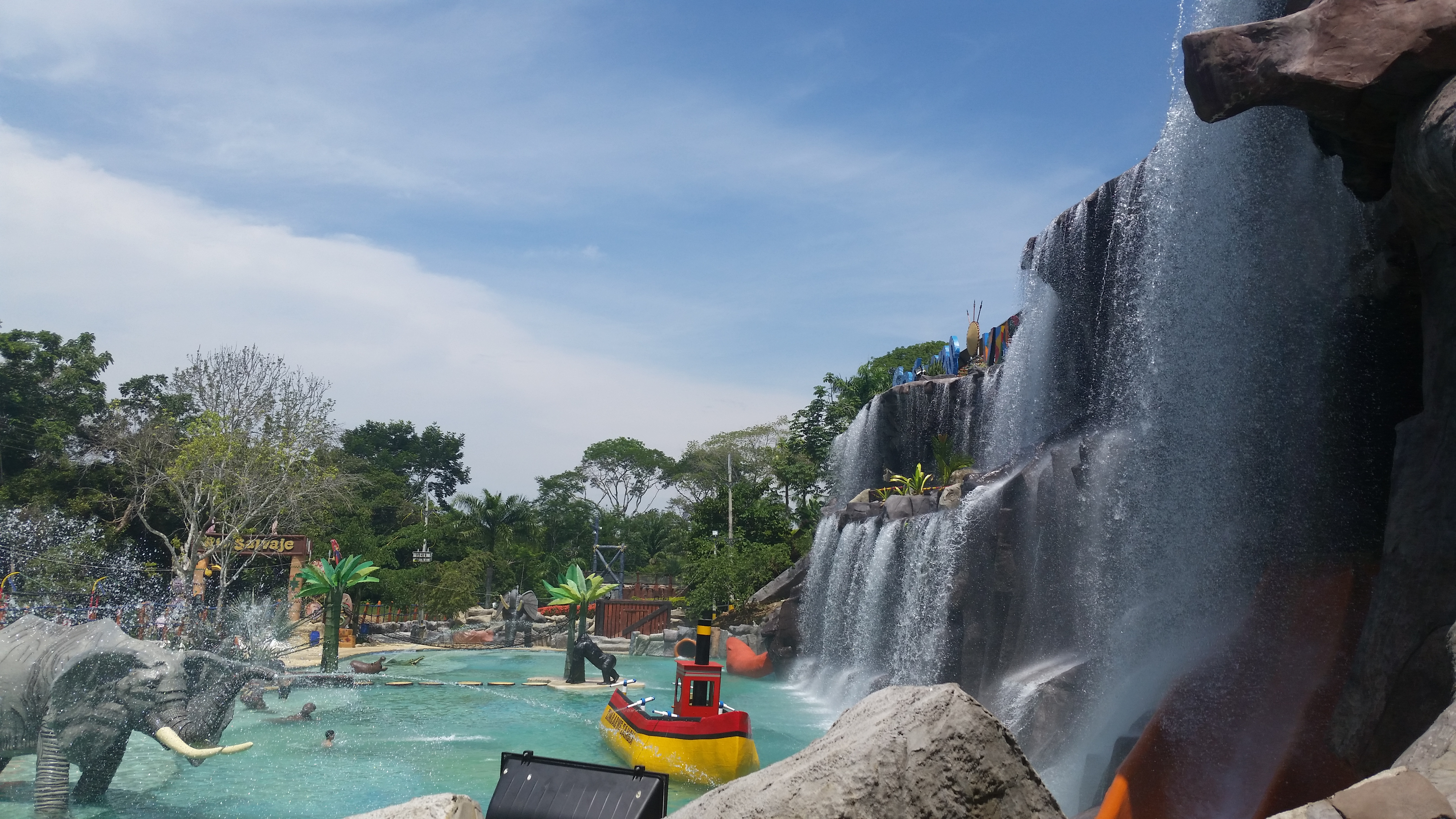
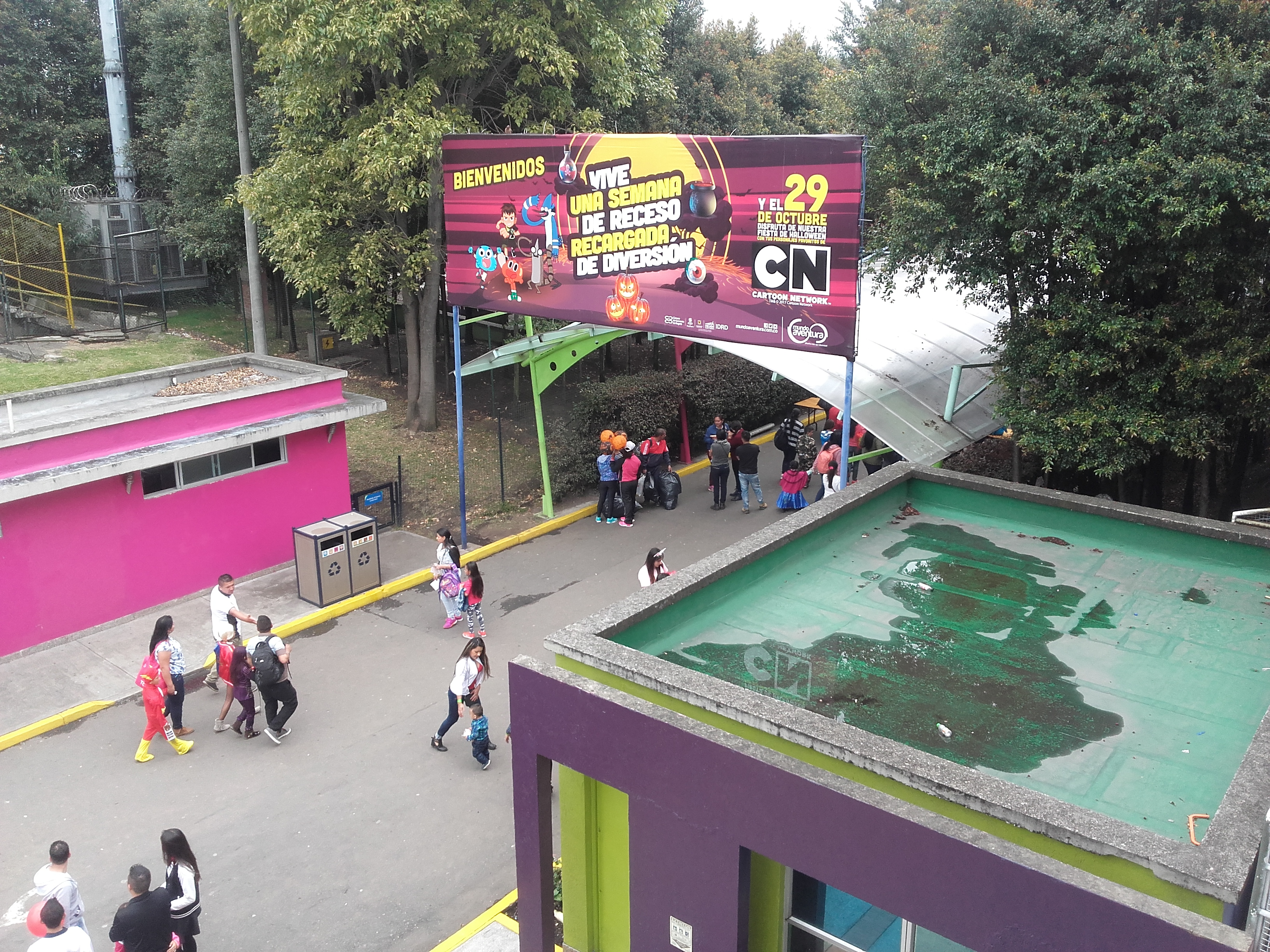
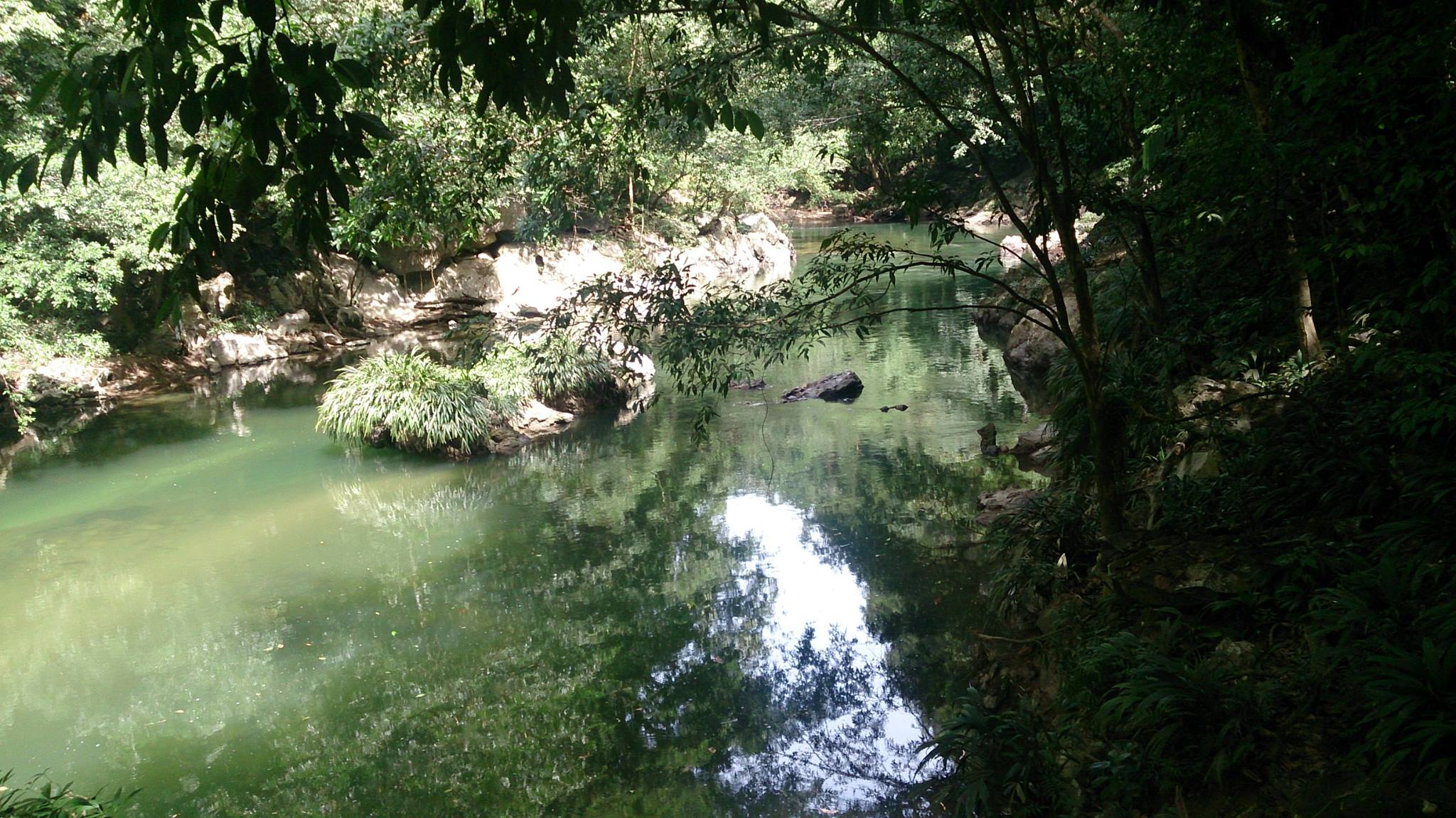
In the film, Hacienda Nápoles (top) and Parque Mundo Aventura (middle) are depicted as the Jungle World, a theme park inspired by the Jungle Cruise, while Reserva Natural Río Claro (bottom) is depicted as the Amazon rainforest.

Filming began in July 2024 and was held for about four months in several locations in Colombia, including Bogotá, Cundinamarca, Antioquia Department, Doradal, and Girardot, with about 53 days of principal photography. The cast and crew were actually in the jungle, Reserva Natural Río Claro, and they had to be careful of the challenges like hot weather, rain, mosquitoes, snakes, and scorpions. A snake handler assisted them throughout as well. A lizard, a snake, and a capybara also appeared in the film, and wranglers from the American Humane Society assisted the cast in handling them. A scene had a live scorpion, real cockroaches, and glued stuffed bugs, including centipedes and beetles. After filming, a container of the bugs was refilled and taken back.

This film was practically two films in one: half in the studio, with absolute control, and the other half in the jungle, with very little control.

— Federico Cantini, cinematographer

Federico Cantini served as the cinematographer, and the cameras he used were Sony VENICE 2 with Leica Summilux at Super35 to capture 5.8K footage, and Sony FX3. The team had a multi-camera setup across the two units, using Steadicam, Rialto, camera dolly, or technocrane. Film speed was kept at ISO 800 for the major part, while some scenes required ISO 3200. TIS Productions hired 401 crew members from Colombia as well, and two stages inside their studio were used to build up the sets, which had practically moving parts, portrayed in the film as the fire traps, moving walls, swings, and the weighing scales, and the sets had security emergency exits as well. The set designs were reviewed and modeled in SketchUp, and the team used intelligent lighting with jelly strips. The pre-production had taken around nine weeks, and to save on post-production costs, each set was redesigned to give it a fresh look and lit up differently by modifying CTO and CTB, and a scene also had LED screens to create the background. Todd Cherniawsky served as production designer, Juan Manuel Barreto as gaffer, and Walter Volpatto as color grader. Some of the scenes were also filmed at Cuevas la Danta.

For this film, I wanted to capture the essence of Dora's innocence, charm, and humor, but also give the film a tension in the moments of the trials she was facing. My first cuts almost felt like a different film at times – a horror Dora film. I think I was able to tone it back for all audiences.

— Evan Ahlgren, film editor

While a few scenes had required body doubles, Lorraine and Rodriguez performed most of the stunts in the film themselves. A tram chase scene required Toro to have a fake drive through the parks, with hundreds of extras behind. Two trams, one for each unit, were remodified and made adjustable after inspiration from a Chinese van, and were used in two parks for filming, Hacienda Nápoles and Parque Mundo Aventura. The second unit included stunt coordinator Brycen Counts and cinematographer Sebastián Cantillo, and they also used Mōvi Pro steadicam and Inspire 3 drone camera. Adam Bonnett and Jonathan McCoy served as executive producers, along with the creators Chris Gifford and Valerie Walsh Valdes, while Kristin Burr, Benjamin Tappan, and Carolina Arciniegas served as the film producers. Evan Ahlgren served as the film editor and he used Media Composer.

Behaviours of monkey, macaw, and fox were studied before creating the respective characters of Boots, Mango, and Swiper a complete CGI. To portray these characters on set, tennis balls and green-dressed people were used as stand-ins, as well as a stuffed monkey. Spin VFX provided the visual effects for the film, and they also created the environment with "dense jungles, waterfalls, and dynamic matte paintings".

=== Music ===
External media

Audio
- Full album on iTunes
- "View From Here" on iTunes

Video
- "Dora y Diego" on Instagram

The soundtrack album consisting of 26 tracks was also released by Republic Records on July 2, 2025, via multiple music streaming services. It was accompanied with a single "View From Here" by Charity Daw, Dora the Explorer theme "Dora y Diego" by Shila Olinda Farahani, and film score. All music is composed by Kenny Wood.

== Release ==
The film premiere event was held in Los Angeles, California, on June 25, 2025. Dora and the Search for Sol Dorado was released in the United States on Paramount+ on July 2, 2025, during the 25th anniversary of the original series, and it premiered simultaneously on Nickelodeon. It was released internationally on July 4 by Paramount+ and Nickelodeon Movies.

== Reception ==
=== Critical reception ===
On the review aggregator website Rotten Tomatoes, 92% of 12 critics' reviews are positive, with an average rating of 6.30/10.

Callie Hanna wrote in FandomWire that the film is "far from perfect, often rushed", but the "charming characters" and "compelling adventure scenes" work out. DeVonne Goode wrote in Parents that with a "more straightforward narrative", the film has "plenty of humor, action, and great displays of teamwork". Rosana Maris Arias called the "story and dialogue" to be "lighthearted", but noted its inaccurate representation of the "Latine community," in a review at The Nerds of Color. Brennan Klein wrote in Screen Rant that the film "has some solid merits and a few major faults, but it's mostly a featureless, smooth blob of family entertainment".

Carlos Aguilar of Variety called it a "flawed family-friendly movie" which might have a "great value beyond its artistic shortcomings". John Serba of Decider reviews that the film "breaks new ground" with "some modest fun and a handful of laughs, and [ends] up in the black creatively". Cath Clarke of The Guardian called it an "inoffensive adventure story" which has the "action sequences looted from Raiders of the Lost Ark". Jane A. of Absolute Geeks reviewed it as a "blandly competent" and "fast-paced" but "forgettable" film, having enough "to avoid sinking" but not "to shine".

=== Accolades ===
At the 2026 Kids' Choice Awards, the film was nominated under a new category, Watch Party: Kids' Choice.
