= The Ridiculous 6 =

2015 film directed by Frank Coraci

- Film release poster
- Directed by: Frank Coraci
- Written by: Tim Herlihy; Adam Sandler
- Produced by: Adam Sandler; Allen Covert; Ted Sarandos
- Starring: Adam Sandler; Terry Crews; Jorge Garcia; Taylor Lautner; Rob Schneider; Luke Wilson; Will Forte; Steve Zahn; Danny Trejo; Harvey Keitel; Nick Nolte
- Cinematography: Dean Semler
- Edited by: Tom Costain
- Music by: Rupert Gregson-Williams; Elmo Weber
- Production company: Happy Madison Productions
- Distributed by: Netflix
- Release date: December 11, 2015
- Running time: 120 minutes
- Country: United States
- Language: English
- Budget: $60 million

The Ridiculous 6 is a 2015 American Western action comedy film directed by Frank Coraci and written by Tim Herlihy and Adam Sandler, and starring Sandler, Terry Crews, Jorge Garcia, Taylor Lautner, Rob Schneider, and Luke Wilson. As Happy Madison Productions' first Western film, as well as their first under Netflix, the plot follows six men who discover that they share the same bank-robbing father (Nick Nolte) and thereafter set out to reunite with him.

Released worldwide on Netflix as their first original film on December 11, 2015, the film was panned by critics and is one of the few films to receive an approval rating of 0% on Rotten Tomatoes.

== Plot ==
In the Old West, Tommy, known as "White Knife" by the Indigenous American tribe who raised him after his mother was murdered, is to marry a member of the tribe named Smoking Fox, as arranged by his adoptive father Chief Screaming Eagle. Following a run-in with Will Patch and his Left-Eye Gang who claimed to have removed their right eye, as well as a one-eyed food proprietor named Clem, Tommy is visited by a bank robber named Frank Stockburn, who claims to be his biological father. Frank tells Tommy that he is dying of consumption and had amassed $50,000 buried in a meadow, which he offers to Tommy and his tribe.

The next day, a group of bandits led by the ruthless Cicero come to the village and want Frank to give them his "big score". Frank has the bandits kidnap him so he can lead them to the money at the so-called "Singing Windmill", in return for the bandits not attacking Tommy or the Natives. After searching the meadow, Tommy is unable to find the stash of money and sets off on a quest to steal the amount needed and save his father.

During his journey, Tommy discovers that he has five half-brothers: Mexican burro rider Ramon, whose innkeeper mother had a fling with Frank; mentally stunted yet happy-go-lucky Lil' Pete, whose strong neck makes him immune to hanging; mountain man Herm, who speaks incomprehensibly and helped his mother sell their moonshine; a drunkard named Danny, who was the former bodyguard of Abraham Lincoln and is guilt-ridden from accidentally leading John Wilkes Booth to murder the president when he mistook him for a fan of the president on his way to the restroom; and African-American saloon pianist Chico, who confesses to being half-black.

Meanwhile, Clem joins the Left-Eye Gang at the cost of his only functional eye and helps them abduct Smoking Fox. She escapes due to Clem's blindness and begins searching for Tommy and his half-brothers, now known as the Ridiculous 6.

After meeting Chico and Danny, the half-brothers have a run in with Chico's boss, sociopathic saloon owner Smiley Harris, who was part of Frank's gang until Frank stole his cut of their biggest score and left him to die at the windmill. When Smiley attempts to kill the half-brothers out of revenge against Frank, he ends up being unintentionally decapitated by Ramon. The group later encounters Abner Doubleday, who is developing baseball with some Chinese immigrants.

The Left-Eye Gang soon catch up to the Ridiculous 6 while the latter are relaxing in a pond. The gang overpowers the Ridiculous 6 and steal their loot. Through Herm's ramblings, translated by Tommy, the Ridiculous 6 then decide to rob a gambling game in Yuma hosted by Ezekiel Grant and attended by Mark Twain and General George Armstrong Custer. The Ridiculous 6 succeed, though Wyatt Earp nearly jeopardizes their plan, and set off to ransom their father.

On the way, the Ridiculous 6 come across the Left-Eye Gang who have been left to die in the desert by Cicero. Tommy and the brothers rescue the Left-Eye Gang and reclaim the $50,000 they had stolen from them. That evening, Tommy sees a photograph carried by Danny that proves Cicero is the one who murdered his mother and sets off alone to rescue his father and confront the bandit leader. After meeting with Cicero and paying the ransom, Tommy confronts Cicero and gets his revenge on his mother's killer.

The Ridiculous 6, who followed Tommy along with the Left-Eye Gang, have a reunion with their long-lost father. When Frank learns his sons exceeded his expectations by amassing $100,000, he reveals that he masterminded his abduction. But Tommy counters that his group had a Plan B: a hidden bomb inside the bag containing the ransom money. When the bomb explodes and commotion ensues, Frank runs off to a mine with Smoking Fox as his hostage. Tommy runs after them and successfully rescues his bride-to-be and captures his father. Frank reveals he knew that Cicero killed Tommy’s mother, as she was going to rat out his gang, and is left to rot in the mine by Tommy.

Back in the Native Village, Tommy weds Smoking Fox with his half-brothers in attendance. Since the revelation that their biological father Frank Stockburn was no more than a two-bit crook and a horrible father, Screaming Eagle decides to adopt all the half-brothers, as he did with Tommy. The Left-Eye Gang revealed that they lied about removing their right eyes, much to the anger of Clem.

In the post-credits, Abner Doubleday and his Chinese baseball team do a chant to detail their appreciation for the Stockburns.

== Cast ==
- Adam Sandler as Tommy "White Knife" Dunson Stockburn, a man who was raised by Indigenous Americans and leader of the Ridiculous 6.
  - Henry Steckman as Young Tommy Stockburn
- Terry Crews as Chico Stockburn, a biracial saloon pianist, the half-brother of Tommy and member of the Ridiculous 6.
- Jorge Garcia as Herm Stockburn, a mountain man, the half-brother of Tommy who speaks incomprehensibly and member of the Ridiculous 6.
  - Robin Leach as the voice of Herm Stockburn.
- Taylor Lautner as "Lil" Pete Stockburn, a mentally stunted, strong-necked man with a happy-go-lucky personality, the half-brother of Tommy and member of the Ridiculous 6.
- Rob Schneider as Ramon Lopez Stockburn, a Mexican burro rider, the half-brother of Tommy and member of the Ridiculous 6.
- Luke Wilson as Danny Stockburn, the former bodyguard of Abraham Lincoln, the half-brother of Tommy and member of the Ridiculous 6.
- Will Forte as Will Patch, the leader of the Left-Eye Gang.
- Steve Zahn as Clem, a former general store owner with one eye who sides with the Left-Eye Gang.
- Harvey Keitel as "Smiley" Harris, the owner of "The Golden Nugget" that Chico works for and former member of Frank's gang.
- Nick Nolte as Frank Stockburn, a bank robber who is the biological father of Tommy, Chico, Herm, Lil' Pete, Ramon, and Danny.
- Jon Lovitz as Ezekiel Grant, the host of a gambling game.
- Whitney Cummings as Susannah
- Danny Trejo as Cicero, the leader of a group of bandits who targets Frank.
  - Ruben Rivera Laguna as Young Cicero
- David Spade as General George Armstrong Custer, who is seen attending a gambling game.
- Vanilla Ice as Mark Twain, who is seen attending a gambling game.
- Nick Swardson as Nelly Patch, a member of the Left-Eye Gang.
- Blake Shelton as Wyatt Earp, a lawman that encounters the Ridiculous 6.
- Julia Jones as Smoking Fox, a member of the Native American tribe that is assigned to marry Tommy.
- Saginaw Grant as Screaming Eagle, the tribal chief of the Native American tribe that adopted Tommy.
- Lavell Crawford as Gus Patch, a member of the Left-Eye Gang.
- Chris Parnell as William, a rude and racist bank manager.
- Dana Goodman as Beaver Breath, a Native American whose name Will unintentionally guess the name of.
- Jared Sandler as Babyface Patch, a member of the Left-Eye Gang.
- Steve Buscemi as "Doc" Griffin, a doctor, dentist, and barber that works near "The Golden Nugget."
- Norm Macdonald as "The Golden Nugget" Customer. This was Macdonald's last on-screen film role before his death in 2021.
- Dan Patrick as Abraham Lincoln, the 16th President of the United States who Danny used to work for.
- Paul Sado as "Stumbles" Patch, a member of the Left-Eye Gang.
- John Turturro as Abner Doubleday, a Union Army soldier who invents baseball in this film.
- Tina Parker as Mary Todd Lincoln, the wife of Abraham Lincoln.
- Chris Kattan as John Wilkes Booth, a Confederate actor who killed Abraham Lincoln while Danny was in the restroom after he mistook him for a fan of the president.
- Jackie Sandler as "Never Wears Bra", a Native American who is friends with Smoking Fox.
- Blake Clark as the Sheriff of Rattler's Gulch
- Katalina Parrish as Sheriff's Wife
- Tim Herlihy as the Bartender of "The Golden Nugget."
- Sadie Sandler and Sunny Sandler as Dancing Kids
- Jonathan Loughran as "Rifleman"
- Kimo Keoke as "Short Stop", a Chinese baseball player who serves as the inspiration to the shortstop.
- James Ning as Qi, a Chinese baseball player.

== Production ==
The Ridiculous 6 had been in production by Columbia Pictures, Paramount Pictures and Warner Bros., but was dropped by all three. Warner Bros. dropped out soon after Adam Sandler and Happy Madison Productions signed a four-picture deal with Netflix, although an insider noted to The Hollywood Reporter that the deal had nothing to do with their decision.

By January 2015, Netflix picked up the film with others joining the cast including Taylor Lautner, Nick Nolte, Blake Shelton, Steve Buscemi, Rob Schneider, Will Forte, Vanilla Ice and Luke Wilson. On February 16, 2015, Jorge Garcia joined the cast. Principal photography began on February 20, 2015, and ended on May 2, 2015.

On April 23, 2015, Indian Country Today Media Network reported that approximately "a dozen Native actors and actresses, as well as the Native cultural advisor, left the set of Adam Sandler's newest film production, The Ridiculous Six" in protest of its portrayal of the Apache culture. The New York Daily News later reported that there were only four who left, out of over 100 Native American actors on the set. Navajo Nation tribal members Loren Anthony and film student Allison Young said they left because they felt the film portrayed Native Americans in a negative light and took satire too far. They also complained that the portrayal of women was degrading. A representative of Netflix responded saying, "The movie has ridiculous in the title for a reason: because it is ridiculous. It is a broad satire of Western movies and the stereotypes they popularized, featuring a diverse cast that is not only part of—but in on—the joke."

On May 4, 2015, the New York Daily News reported that Ricky Lee, one of the Native American actors on the Ridiculous 6 set, said previous news reports were exaggerated and indeed there were only "four actors who left, but there were 150 extras, including grandmas and grandpas and children, who kept working." Apparently, before the film's wrap party, he and several other actors were approached by Sandler to speak about the controversy. Lee considered that those who left raised legitimate issues but it was "the wrong battlefield."

== Release ==
The film premiered on Netflix on December 11, 2015. On January 6, 2016, Netflix announced that the film had been viewed more times in 30 days than any other film in Netflix history. It also made it to the number 1 spot in every territory in which Netflix operates.

=== Critical response ===
On Rotten Tomatoes, the film has an approval rating of 0% based on 36 reviews, with an average rating of 2.40/10. The site's critical consensus reads, "Every bit as lazily offensive as its cast and concept would suggest, The Ridiculous Six is standard couch fare for Adam Sandler fanatics and must-avoid viewing for film enthusiasts of every other persuasion." On Metacritic, the film has a weighted average score of 18 out of 100 based on reviews from 12 critics, indicating "overwhelming dislike".

Justin Chang of Variety wrote: "The scenery ain't bad but the laughs are tumbleweed-sparse in The Ridiculous 6, a Western sendup so lazy and aimless, it barely qualifies as parody." Mike McCahill of The Guardian gave it 2 out of 5 and wrote: "Peer through this dopey haze long enough, and you can't fail to notice the cavalier racial attitudes, the endlessly pliable women; you'd have every right to be outraged, were it not now par for the Sandler course."

== See also ==
- List of films with a 0% rating on Rotten Tomatoes
