= Allen Covert =

American comedian and actor

- Covert at GalaxyCon St Louis in 2026
- Born: Allen Stephen Covert; October 13, 1964 (age 62); West Palm Beach, Florida, U.S.
- Occupations: Actor; comedian; writer; producer
- Years active: 1989–present
- Spouse: Kathryn Hagstrom (m. 2006; div. 2019)
- Children: 4

Allen Stephen Covert (born October 13, 1964) is an American comedian, actor, writer, and producer. He is best known for his starring role in the 2006 comedy film Grandma's Boy, and his supporting actor role in the movie Strange Wilderness (2008). He is a frequent collaborator of actor and friend Adam Sandler with prominent roles in such films as Happy Gilmore (1996), The Wedding Singer (1998), Big Daddy (1999), Little Nicky (2000), Mr. Deeds (2002), Anger Management (2003), 50 First Dates (2004) and I Now Pronounce You Chuck and Larry (2007).

== Early and personal life ==
Covert was born in West Palm Beach, Florida, the son of Elizabeth Ann (née Duhy) and Stephen Covert. His father was Jewish, and his mother was a Southern Baptist. He studied theater at New York University, where he was a classmate of Adam Sandler. Covert has served as a performer, writer, and/or producer for almost every film and comedy album Sandler has ever released.

He married Kathryn Ashley Hagstrom on February 14, 2006. Covert and Hagstrom have four children. In July 2019, Hagstrom filed for divorce; it was finalized in November 2019.

== Career ==
Covert's first film role was a cruise ship bartender in Sandler's 1989 film Going Overboard which also was Sandler's first cinematic appearance. Covert had minor parts in several subsequent Sandler films such as Otto the homeless caddy in Happy Gilmore, before his first prominent role in 1998's The Wedding Singer alongside Sandler and Drew Barrymore. Covert would continue to have roles in Sandler's next four films, including one in Little Nicky for which he gained 40 pounds. He eventually settled back into walk-on and single-scene appearances in Sandler's films beginning with 50 First Dates in 2004.

In 2006, Covert starred in the comedy film Grandma's Boy, his first (and only) lead role. Sandler served as an executive producer. Covert has also had small roles in films that neither star nor are produced by Sandler: Never Been Kissed, Late Last Night, and Heavyweights.

Although Covert's on-screen presence has been reduced in recent years, he has served an active role in Sandler's movie production company, Happy Madison Productions, where Covert was an executive producer and sometimes co-writer on most of the company's films. In addition, Covert has contributed heavily to Sandler's many comedy albums, and frequently receives co-songwriting credits on the original songs that Sandler performs in many of his films. In 2023, after the release of Leo, Covert departed from Happy Madison following a three-year hiatus to focus on a family situation. He has revealed plans to found his own production company, with a personal goal for a return of theatrically released R-rated comedy films. Meanwhile, he is currently involved with Meemaw, an upcoming series starring Roseanne Barr. Covert began appearing at fan conventions in April 2024.

Covert appeared as himself, along with Adam Sandler, in an episode of the television series Undeclared. The show's creator, Judd Apatow, is another friend and former college classmate of Covert and Sandler.

Covert cofounded Cherry Tree Books, a publisher of eBooks for children.

== Filmography ==
Year	Title	Contribution			Role	Notes
Year	Title	Actor	Producer	Writer	Role	Notes
1989	Going Overboard	Yes			Bartender	
1991	Roseanne	Yes			Man #1	"Vegas Interruptus"
1991	Ferris Bueller	Yes			Steve	"A Night in the Life"
1993	The Ben Stiller Show	Yes			Waiter #1	"A Few Good Scouts"
1994	Airheads	Yes			Cop	
1994	Saturday Night Live			Yes	—N/a	"Sara Gilbert / Counting Crows"
1995	Heavyweights	Yes			Kenny	
1996	Happy Gilmore	Yes			Otto	
1996	Bulletproof	Yes			Detective Jones	
1996	Adam Sandler: "Steve Polychronopolous"		Yes	Yes	—N/a	Music Video
1998	The Wedding Singer	Yes			Sammy	
1998	The Waterboy	Yes			Walter	
1999	Never Been Kissed	Yes			Roger in Op-Ed	
1999	Big Daddy	Yes	Yes		Phil D'Amato	Associate Producer
1999	Late Last Night	Yes			Coked Guy	TV movie Credited as Alan Coert
1999	The Peeper	Yes		Yes	The Boyfriend (Voice Role)	Short Film
1999	Freaks and Geeks	Yes			Greasy Clerk	"Beers and Weirs"
1999	Deuce Bigalow: Male Gigolo	Yes			Vic	
1999	The Peeper		Yes		—N/a	Short Film
1999	Saturday Night Live: The Best of Adam Sandler			Yes	—N/a	Television Documentary
2000	Little Nicky	Yes	Yes		Todd	Associate Producer
2000	Little Nicky	Yes			Todd (Voice Role)	Video Game
2000	Saturday Night Live: The Best of Chris Farley			Yes	—N/a	Television Documentary
2001	Undeclared	Yes			Allen Covert (Uncredited)	"The Assistant"
2002	Mr. Deeds	Yes	Yes		Marty	Associate Producer
2002	Eight Crazy Nights	Yes	Yes	Yes	Old Lady / Bus Driver / Mayor's Wife	Voice Role
2002	A Day with the Meatball		Yes		—N/a	Short Film
2003	Anger Management	Yes	Yes		Andrew	Executive Producer
2004	50 First Dates	Yes			Ten Second Tom	
2006–2007	The King of Queens	Yes			Matthew Klein / Towel Guy	2 episodes
2005	The Longest Yard	Yes	Yes		Referee	Executive Producer
2006	Grandma's Boy	Yes	Yes	Yes	Alex	
2006	The Benchwarmers			Yes	—N/a	
2007	I Now Pronounce You Chuck & Larry	Yes	Yes		Steve	Co-Producer
2007–2009	Slacker Cats	Yes			Trevor Dagdale (Voice Role)	2 episodes
2008	Strange Wilderness	Yes			Fred	
2008	The House Bunny	Yes	Yes		Waiter #2 (Uncredited)	
2008	Bedtime Stories	Yes			Ferrari Guy	
2009	Paul Blart: Mall Cop	Yes			Jerky Security Guy	
2009	Leisure Suit Larry: Box Office Bust			Yes	—N/a	Video Game
2009	Funny People	Yes			Himself (Uncredited)	Archival Footage
2010	Pretend Time	Yes			Larry	"Blah Blah Blah Main Street"
2010	Grown Ups		Yes		—N/a	Executive Producer
2011	Just Go with It	Yes	Yes		Brian/Soul Patch	Executive Producer
2011	Bucky Larson: Born to Be a Star	Yes	Yes	Yes	Pornstore Clerk (Uncredited)	
2011	Jack and Jill	Yes	Yes	Yes	Otto	Executive Producer; Second Rewrite (Uncredited)
2011	Mobsters	Yes			Harry	"Weed Like to Talk to You"
2012	Hotel Transylvania	Yes	Yes		Additional Voices (Voice Role)	Executive Producer
2012	That's My Boy		Yes		—N/a	
2013	Grown Ups 2	Yes	Yes		Hippie Teacher	Executive Producer
2014	Blended	Yes	Yes		10 Second Tom	Executive Producer
2015	Pixels	Yes	Yes		Abusive Citizen	
2015	The Ridiculous 6		Yes		—N/a	
2015	Hotel Transylvania 2	Yes	Yes		Candle Cake Monster (Voice Role)	Executive Producer
2016	The Do-Over		Yes		—N/a	
2017	Sandy Wexler	Yes	Yes		Gurvy	
2018	Father of the Year	Yes	Yes		Trey's Dad	
2018	The Week Of		Yes		—N/a	
2018	Adam Sandler: 100% Fresh		Yes		—N/a	TV special
2019	Murder Mystery	Yes	Yes		Tourist Dad	
2020	The Wrong Missy	Yes	Yes		Bank Employee	
2020	Hubie Halloween	Yes	Yes		Zombie Movie Dad	
2022	Home Team	Yes	Yes		Referee Covert	
2023	Murder Mystery 2		Yes		—N/a	
2023	Leo		Yes		—N/a	Executive Producer
TBA	Mini War			Yes	—N/a	
