= You Are So Not Invited to My Bat Mitzvah =

2023 American film by Sammi Cohen

- Release poster
- Directed by: Sammi Cohen
- Written by: Alison Peck
- Based on: You Are So Not Invited to My Bat Mitzvah by Fiona Rosenbloom
- Produced by: Adam Sandler; Tim Herlihy; Leslie Morgenstein; Elysa Koplovitz Dutton
- Starring: Idina Menzel; Sunny Sandler; Jackie Sandler; Adam Sandler; Sadie Sandler; Samantha Lorraine; Dylan Hoffman; Sarah Sherman; Dan Bulla; Ido Mosseri; Jackie Hoffman; Luis Guzmán
- Cinematography: Ben Hardwicke
- Edited by: Jamie Keeney
- Music by: Este Haim; Amanda Yamate
- Production companies: Happy Madison Productions; Alloy Entertainment
- Distributed by: Netflix
- Release date: August 25, 2023
- Running time: 103 minutes
- Country: United States
- Language: English

You Are So Not Invited to My Bat Mitzvah is a 2023 American coming-of-age comedy-drama film directed by Sammi Cohen, written by Alison Peck, and produced by Adam Sandler, Tim Herlihy, Leslie Morgenstein, and Elysa Koplovitz Dutton. Based on the 2005 young adult novel of the same name, the film stars Sandler and his wife, Jackie Sandler, as well as their daughters, Sadie and Sunny Sandler. It also stars Samantha Lorraine, Idina Menzel, Dylan Hoffman, Sarah Sherman, Dan Bulla, Ido Mosseri, Jackie Hoffman, and Luis Guzmán. It tells the story of two best friends whose bat mitzvah plans go awry as they fight for the attention of the same popular boy.

Produced by Happy Madison Productions and Alloy Entertainment, the film was released by Netflix on August 25, 2023.

== Plot ==
Stacy Friedman dreams about her upcoming bat mitzvah, including sharing it with her best friend Lydia Rodriguez Katz, and sharing a dance with her crush, Andy Goldfarb. She clashes with her parents, Bree and Danny, over planning the "perfect" party, which she believes will determine her future.

When popular student Kym Chang Cohen invites Lydia to her house, Stacy tags along. The girls go on a high ledge, where Andy and his friends meet up with them. On a dare and to impress Andy, Stacy agrees to jump off the ledge into the water below. Enjoying Andy's and everyone's approval is short-lived, as Stacy's bloody maxi-pad floats up next to her. Angry that everyone, including Lydia, is laughing at her, Stacy "calls it", and Lydia announces the time that she lost her crush on Andy.

Once school starts, Stacy learns that Lydia and Andy are dating. Feeling betrayed, she stops talking to her and sends a text message to an anonymous group that Lydia has long hair on her nipples. Stacy even sabotages an entrance video she had been making for Lydia's upcoming bat mitzvah with humiliating personal video clips. However, she does not plan to send it.

Stacy continues trying to get Andy's attention, so she visits his grandmother's retirement home, and pretends to be a volunteer. She tries to look older and more popular, and argues with her parents over planning her bat mitzvah. Andy eventually offers to give Stacy her first kiss. Hiding behind the curtains of a Torah ark, they are interrupted by their teacher Rabbi Rebecca, which leads to more fighting between her and her father.

Lydia's mother Gabi, unaware Stacy and Lydia are fighting, arrives at the Friedman's, and asks Bree for the entrance video for Lydia's bat mitzvah. Not realizing what the video contains, Bree sends it to her. At Lydia's bat mitzvah, the hateful entrance video is played. Although Stacy tries to get the video stopped, the damage is done. As Lydia walks into her party, she runs off and angrily chastises Stacy.

At Stacy's bat mitzvah day, she starts to read from the Torah from her parsha of Ki Tissa. Seeing that Lydia and her parents are missing, she stops, then confesses everything to the audience. She berates Andy for his bad behavior and for driving her and Lydia apart. She then finishes her Torah reading at her father's urging.

Afterwards, Stacy runs through town to apologize to Lydia and invites her to her party later that night. When Lydia and her parents arrive, they are surprised that Stacy has made it into a party for Lydia, too, and the girls make up. Stacy starts dancing with Matteo, a foreign classmate who has been interested in her.

Sometime later, Stacy, Lydia, and their friends have a bake sale to help the retirement home.

== Cast ==
- Idina Menzel as Bree Friedman, Stacy and Ronnie's mother
- Jackie Sandler as Gabi Rodriguez Katz, Lydia's mother
- Adam Sandler as Danny Friedman, Stacy and Ronnie's father
- Sadie Sandler as Ronnie Friedman, a high school student and Stacy's older sister
- Sunny Sandler as Stacy Friedman, a middle school student looking forward to her bat mitzvah
- Samantha Lorraine as Lydia Rodriguez Katz, Stacy's half-Jewish, half-Hispanic best friend
- Dylan Hoffman as Andy Goldfarb, Stacy's classmate and love interest
- Sarah Sherman as Rebecca, a rabbi
- Dan Bulla as Jerry, a cantor
- Ido Mosseri as DJ Schmuley, an Israeli DJ who performs at both Lydia and Stacy's bat mitzvahs
- Jackie Hoffman as Irene, an elder in Stacy's synagogue congregation
- Zaara Kuttemperoor as Zaara, Ronnie's Indian-American best friend
- Luis Guzmán as Eli Rodriguez, Lydia's father
- Beth Hall as Julie
- Judd Goodstein as Aaron

The rest of the cast includes Dean Scott Vazquez as Matteo, an Ecuadorian boy who likes Stacy; Miya Cech as Kym Chang Cohen, a popular half-Jewish, half-Asian girl who is friends with Lydia; Dylan Chloe Dash as Tara; Millie Thorpe as Nikki; Michael Buscemi as a retirement home orderly; and Bruria Cooperman as Andy's grandmother.

== Production ==
In 2022, Netflix announced that the 2005 young adult novel You Are So Not Invited to My Bat Mitzvah by Fiona Rosenbloom would be adapted by screenwriter Alison Peck into a feature film of the same name directed by Sammi Cohen and starring Adam Sandler. Principal photography began on June 29, 2022, in Toronto, Canada, and lasted until August 11. Alloy Entertainment served as a co-production company on the film, alongside Happy Madison Productions. In July 2022, Idina Menzel, Jackie Sandler, Sadie Sandler, Sunny Sandler, Samantha Lorraine, Dylan Hoffman, Sarah Sherman, Dan Bulla, Ido Mosseri, Jackie Hoffman, and Luis Guzmán were revealed to have been cast in the film.

== Release ==
You Are So Not Invited to My Bat Mitzvah was released by Netflix on August 25, 2023.

== Reception ==
On the review aggregator website Rotten Tomatoes, 91% of 80 critics' reviews are positive, with an average rating of 6.8/10. The website's consensus reads: "A coming-of-age comedy that sidesteps simple nostalgia, You Are So Not Invited to My Bat Mitzvah finds fresh humor in adolescent anxiety—and suggests a bright future for star Sunny Sandler." Metacritic, which uses a weighted average, assigned the film a score of 71 out of 100, based on 20 critics, indicating "generally favorable" reviews.
