= Jackie Sandler =

American actress

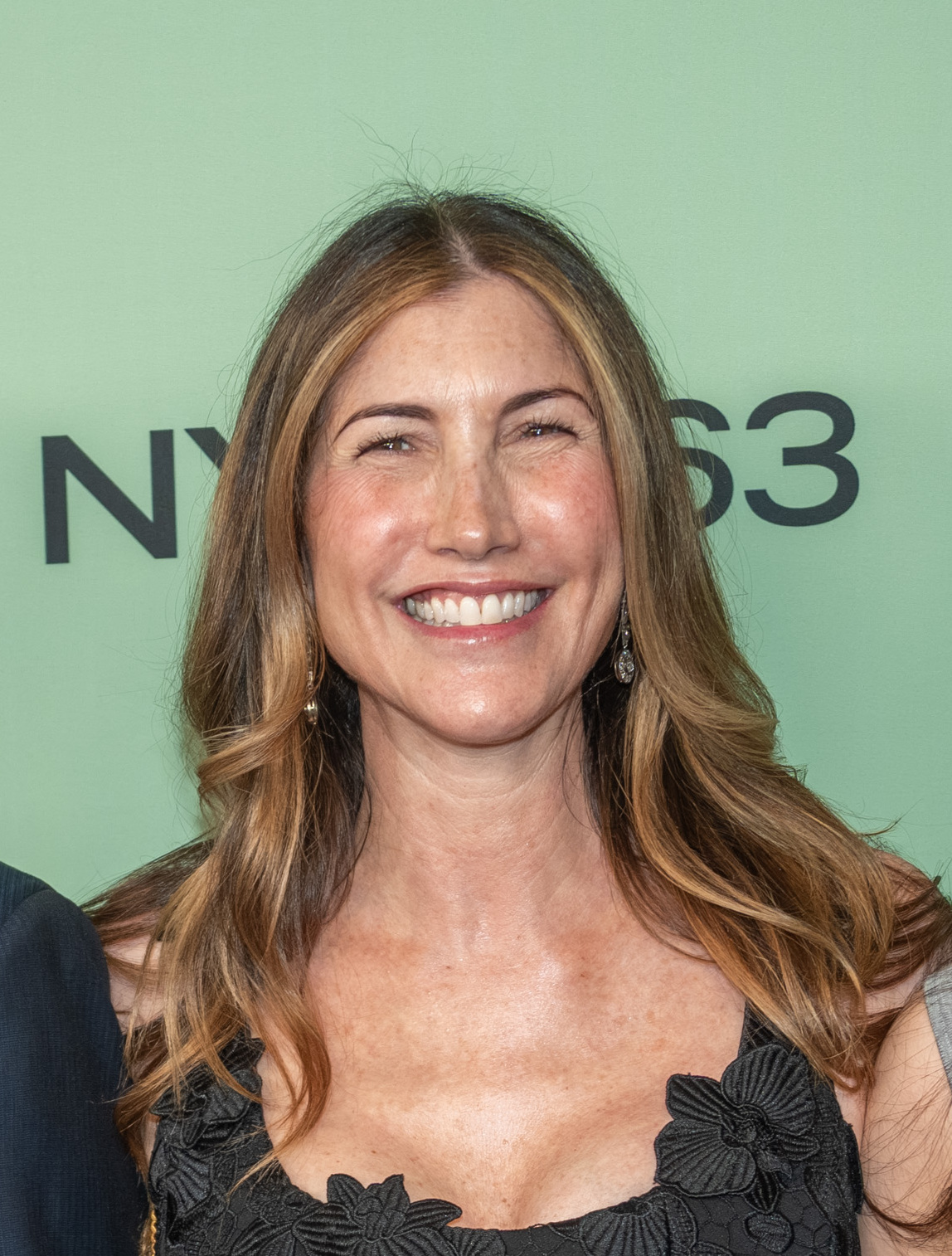
- Sandler in 2025
- Born: Jacqueline Samantha Titone; September 24, 1974 (age 52); Coral Springs, Florida, U.S.
- Occupation: Actress
- Years active: 1998–present
- Spouse: Adam Sandler (m. 2003)
- Children: Sadie; Sunny
- Father: Joseph H. Titone

Jacqueline Samantha Sandler (née Titone; born September 24, 1974) is an American actress. She is best known for her role in the 1999 comedy film Big Daddy, as well as several other roles in her husband Adam Sandler's production company Happy Madison Productions.

== Early life ==
Jacqueline Samantha Titone was born on September 24, 1974, in Coral Springs, Florida, to Joseph H. Titone and Lila (née Impellizeri). She is of Italian descent. She graduated from Coral Springs High School.

== Career ==
In 1998, she had been approached by Rob Schneider, who eventually introduced her into the world of acting by giving her the first role as Sally in the 1999 comedy film Deuce Bigalow: Male Gigolo (1999). As the film became a success, she was eventually introduced to her future husband Adam Sandler, who offered her a part in the 1999 comedy film Big Daddy.

She then made her first starring role as the voice of Jennifer in the 2002 animated comedy film Eight Crazy Nights, which also starred Adam Sandler.

She often appears in supporting and minor roles in Adam Sandler's films, including Grown Ups, Grown Ups 2, 50 First Dates, Little Nicky, I Now Pronounce You Chuck & Larry, Just Go with It, The Ridiculous 6 and That's My Boy.

Besides working in her husband's films, she appeared in television shows such as The King of Queens, Rules of Engagement, Marry Me and The Goldbergs.

== Personal life ==
Jacqueline met Adam Sandler at a party prior to working on the set of Big Daddy (1999). She converted to Judaism, which is Sandler's religion. On June 23, 2003, they were married in a lavish Jewish affair in Malibu, California.

They have two daughters, Sadie (born May 6, 2006) and Sunny (born November 2, 2008). Both daughters starred with both of their parents in the 2020 comedy film Hubie Halloween.

== Filmography ==
=== Film ===
Year	Title	Role	Notes
1998	The Waterboy	Hot Cop	Uncredited role
1999	Big Daddy	Waitress	
1999	Deuce Bigalow: Male Gigolo	Sally	
2000	Little Nicky	Jenna	
2001	Joe Dirt	Hayley	
2001	The Animal	Jane	Uncredited role
2002	Eight Crazy Nights	Jennifer (voice)	
2003	Duplex	Bartender	
2004	50 First Dates	Dentist	
2005	The Longest Yard	Cleaning Lady	Uncredited role
2006	The Benchwarmers	Female Customer	
2007	I Now Pronounce You Chuck & Larry	Teacher	
2008	You Don't Mess with the Zohan	Mom in Line for Goat Ride	Uncredited role
2008	Bedtime Stories	Lady Jacqueline	
2009	Paul Blart: Mall Cop	Victoria's Secret Sales Associate	
2010	Grown Ups	Jackie Tardio	
2011	Just Go with It	Veruca	
2011	Bucky Larson: Born to Be a Star	Casting Director	
2011	Zookeeper	TGIF Waitress	
2012	That's My Boy	Masseuse	
2012	Hotel Transylvania	Martha (voice)	
2013	Grown Ups 2	Jackie Tardio	
2014	Blended	Hollywood Stepmom	
2015	Paul Blart: Mall Cop 2	Attractive Lady	
2015	Pixels	President's Assistant Jennifer	Credited as Jacqueline Sandler
2015	The Ridiculous 6	Never Wears Bra	
2016	The Do-Over	Joan	
2017	Sandy Wexler	Amy Baskin	
2018	The Week Of	Lisa	
2018	Father of the Year	Krystal	
2018	Adam Sandler: 100% Fresh	Herself	
2019	The Last Summer	Tracey	
2019	Murder Mystery	Great Looking Flight Attendant	
2020	Deported	Reporter	
2020	The Wrong Missy	Jess	
2020	Hubie Halloween	Tracy Phillips	
2021	Yes Day	Woman at Concert	Uncredited role
2022	Home Team	Beth	
2022	Daddy Daughter Trip	Megan Bublé	
2023	The Out-Laws	Kay	
2023	You Are So Not Invited to My Bat Mitzvah	Gabi Rodriguez Katz	
2023	Leo	Jayda's Mom (voice)	
2024	Drugstore June	Detective Justine Piazzo	
2024	Adam Sandler: Love You	Herself	
2025	31 Candles	Susan	
2025	Kinda Pregnant	Yoga Class Teacher	
2025	Happy Gilmore 2	Monica	
2026	Office Romance	Caroline	
2026	Don't Say Good Luck	Jill	also producer
TBA	Grown Ups 3	TBA	Also producer, filming

=== Television ===
Year	Title	Role	Notes
2007	The King of Queens	Mrs. Kaufman	Episode: "Offensive Fowl"
2013	Rules of Engagement	Nurse Linda	Episode: "100th"
2015	Marry Me	Fake Pam	Episode: "Mom Me"
2016	The Goldbergs	Elaine	Episode: "Stefan King"
2016–2018	Kevin Can Wait	Cindy	5 episodes
2017	Real Rob	Mrs. Julie	Episode: "Priorities"
