= Samantha Lorraine =

American actress (born 2007)

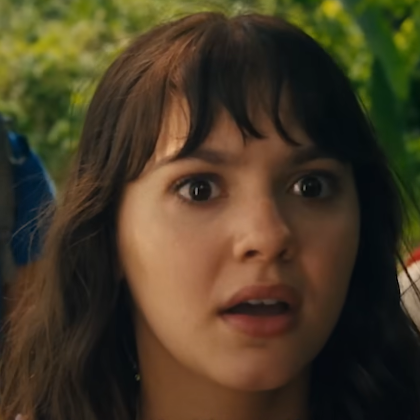
- Lorraine as Dora in Dora and the Search for Sol Dorado (2025)
- Born: Samantha Lorraine Luis; May 11, 2007 (age 19); Los Angeles, California, U.S.
- Occupation: Actress
- Years active: 2020–present

Samantha Lorraine (born May 11, 2007) is an American actress, best known for her roles in You Are So Not Invited to My Bat Mitzvah (2023) and Dora and the Search for Sol Dorado (2025).

== Early life ==
Born to a Cuban family on May 11, 2007, in Los Angeles, California, Samantha Lorraine Luis was raised in Miami, Florida. Her parents, Mat and Candy Lorraine, recognized her early interest in performance and actively supported her pursuit of an acting career. They encouraged her participation in local theater productions and enrolled her in acting classes, fostering her development from a young age. She has a younger brother.

== Career ==
Her career started in the TV show Kid Stew in 2020. The same year, she appeared as young Hope Bennett in AMC's The Walking Dead: World Beyond.

In 2023, she appeared in the Netflix comedy You Are So Not Invited to My Bat Mitzvah, directed by Sammi Cohen. She played the role of a Jewish-Hispanic girl, Lydia, who falls in love with the same guy as her best friend Stacy, played by Sunny Sandler.

In 2024, it was announced that Lorraine would star as the live-action Dora Márquez in Dora and the Search for Sol Dorado. The rebooted film, directed by Alberto Belli, was released in 2025, and she was termed as the sixth Dora of the franchise. Having a background of being a gymnast and a dancer, she was able to do the stunts in the film herself. She is nominated for Best Acting in the creative talent and performance category at the upcoming 2026 Kidscreen Awards.

Also in 2024, it was announced that Lorraine will star in the horror thriller Night Comes alongside Dafne Keen as survivor sisters in an apocalyptic world. The film, directed by Jay Hernandez, is in the post-production phase.

== Filmography ==
Year	Title	Role	Notes
2020	Kid Stew	Samantha	10 episodes
2020	The Walking Dead: World Beyond	Young Hope	3 episodes
2021	The Kid Who Only Hit Homers	Ally	TV Movie
2023	The Love Advisor	Lucy	TV Movie
2023	You Are So Not Invited to My Bat Mitzvah	Lydia Rodriguez Katz	
2025	Dora and the Search for Sol Dorado	Dora Márquez	
TBA	Night Comes		Post-production
