= Dora (Dora the Explorer) =

Dora the Explorer protagonist

Dora Márquez
- Dora the Explorer character
- First appearance: "The Legend of the Big Red Chicken"; Dora the Explorer; 2000
- Created by: Chris Gifford; Valerie Walsh Valdes; Eric Weiner
- Designed by: Helena Giersz
- Portrayed by: Isabela Merced (2019 film); Madelyn Miranda (2019 film; young); Samantha Lorraine (2025 film); Scarlett Spears (2025 film; young)
- Voiced by: Kathleen Herles (2000–2009); Caitlin Sanchez (2008–2012); Fátima Ptacek (2012–2019); Stephanie Joy (2011; Dora's Explorer Girls: Our First Concert); Karina Padura (singing voice for Our First Concert); Sophia Torres (2021–2023, Paramount+ commercials); Diana Zermeño (2023–present)

In-universe information
- Full name: Dora Márquez
- Nickname: Dora the Explorer
- Gender: Female
- Relatives: Elena Márquez (mother); Cole Márquez (father); Guillermo Márquez (brother); Isabella Márquez (sister); Abuela (paternal grandmother); Abuelito (paternal grandfather); Nico Márquez (paternal uncle); Sabrina Márquez (paternal aunt by marriage); Daisy Márquez (paternal older cousin); Alicia Márquez (paternal cousin); Diego Márquez (paternal cousin)
- Nationality: Latin American

Dora Márquez is the titular character of the children's animated television series and multimedia franchise of the same name.

== Depiction ==
=== Earlier versions ===
Dora was originally created to help teach Spanish to primary schoolers. As time went on, she was depicted on live shows in theatres, stadiums, and halls, originally as a bunny that lived in the woods, but later in production as a Latina girl.

=== Animated versions ===
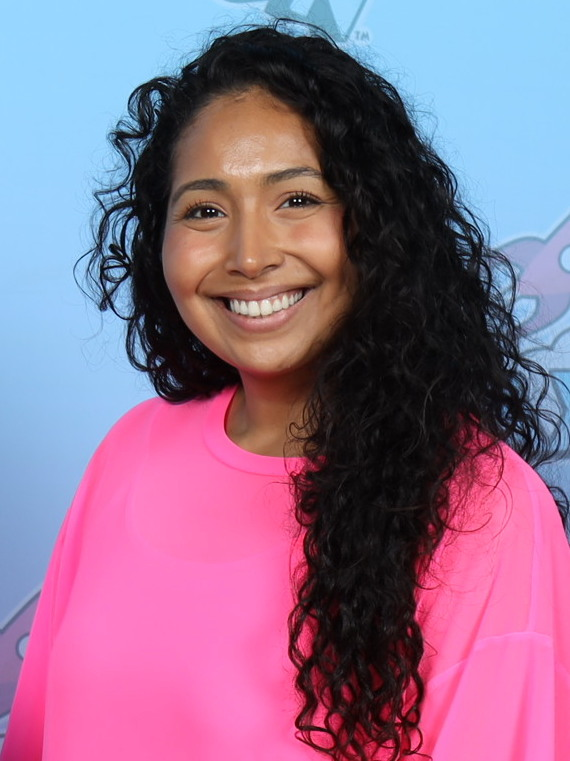
Kathleen Herles was the original voice of Dora.

As a child 7-8 years old in Dora the Explorer (2000), she is portrayed as a multilingual educator who likes sports, family, exploring the world, and her friends Boots, Backpack, Map, Isa, Benny, and Tico. Dora also has two cousins named Diego Márquez, and his sister, Alicia Márquez, with whom she sometimes has adventures. As a 10-year-old in Dora and Friends: Into the City! (2014), she is portrayed as a compassionate leader and role model, who has multiple dynamic peer relationships.

=== Live action versions ===
In Dora and the Lost City of Gold (2019), she is portrayed by Isabela Moner as a high school teen and a naïve fish-out-of-water weirdo to the people around her. Her friend needs to remind her that she is an explorer (a positive designation), not a treasure hunter (a negative designation). In this adaptation, she is described as a "Latino superhero" by executive producer and actor Eugenio Derbez. In addition, Madelyn Miranda portrays young Dora.

In Dora and the Search for Sol Dorado (2025), she is portrayed by Samantha Lorraine as a 19-year-old "smart" and "quick-witted" girl, who is less of a singing but more of a catchphrasing person. She lives in a jungle and believes in ancient Inca myths. After going through her low times, she rediscovers herself to be the real Map. In addition, Scarlett Spears appears as young Dora.

== Cultural impact ==
Dora has played a significant role in early childhood education by promoting cultural awareness, bilingual language skills, and problem-solving abilities. Studies have noted that programs like Dora the Explorer contribute to cognitive development by encouraging audience interaction and critical thinking. The character's positive representation of Latina culture has also been credited with improving multicultural visibility in children's programming. (Note: Portions of commentary are attributed to Vladimir VonRueden's review in Speed-Program, and a review in MDW Consulting.)

The character has also been the subject of parodies, on shows like Robot Chicken and Saturday Night Live.
