= Sunny Sandler =

American actress (born 2008)

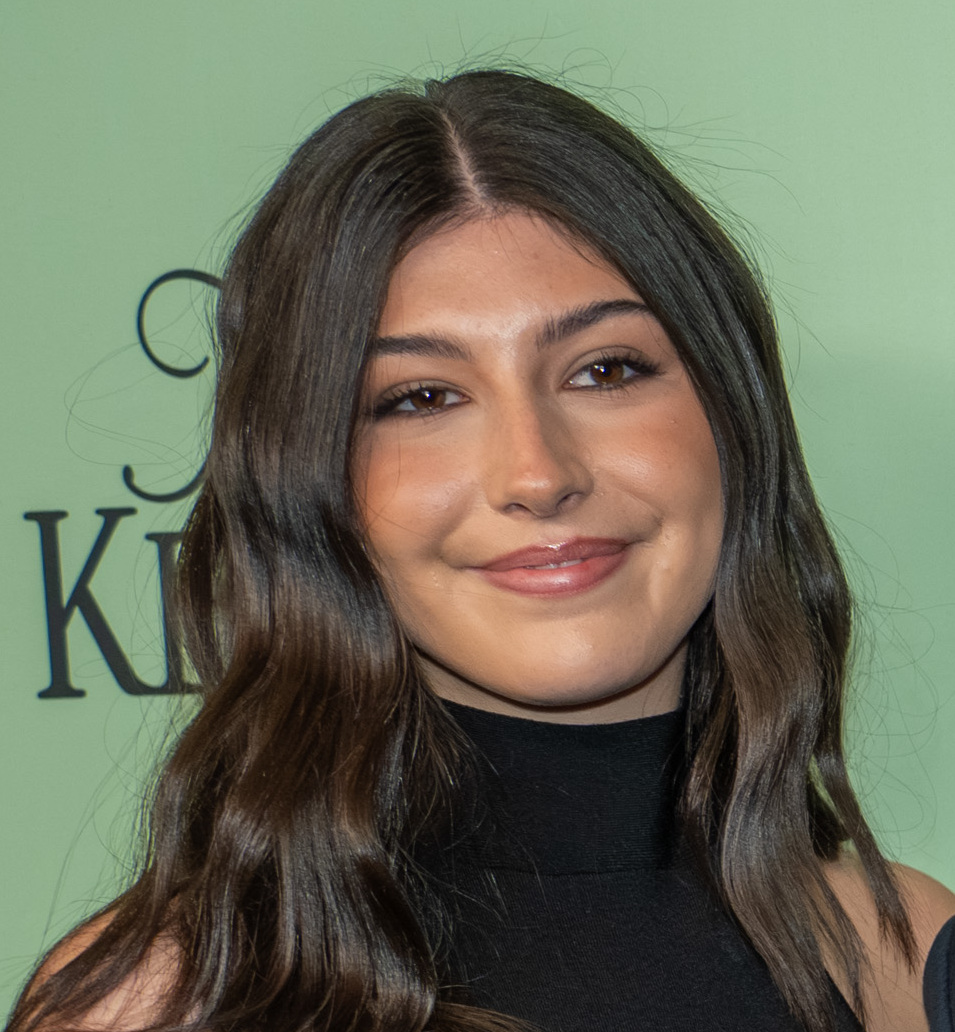
- Sandler in 2025
- Born: Sunny Madeline Sandler; November 2, 2008 (age 18); California, U.S.
- Occupation: Actress
- Years active: 2009–present
- Parent(s): Adam Sandler; Jackie Sandler
- Relatives: Sadie Sandler (sister); Joseph H. Titone (grandfather)

Sunny Madeline Sandler (born November 2, 2008) is an American actress. Her parents are actors Adam Sandler and Jackie Sandler. She is known for playing Stacy Friedman in You Are So Not Invited to My Bat Mitzvah (2023) and Vienna Gilmore in Happy Gilmore 2 (2025), both of which star her parents.

== Early life ==
Sunny Madeline Sandler was born on November 2, 2008, in California to actor and comedian Adam Sandler and model and actress Jackie Titone. She has an older sister named Sadie, who is also an actress. The sisters are of Russian-Jewish descent on their father's side and Italian descent on their mother's side. The two are granddaughters of politician Joseph H. Titone.

Sandler had her own bat mitzvah in May 2022 at the L.A. country club. The star-studded event included Jennifer Aniston, Taylor Lautner, David Spade, and Peyton List. American singers and songwriters Charlie Puth and Halsey performed.

== Career ==
Sunny Sandler began her acting career as a child, often appearing in films produced by her father. The first film in which she appeared was Grown Ups (2010). She played the daughter of Tardio, a friend of her father's character. She has appeared in several other Adam Sandler films including Just Go with It (2011), Jack and Jill (2011), That's My Boy (2012), Grown Ups 2 (2013), Blended (2014), The Ridiculous 6 (2015), Sandy Wexler (2017), The Week Of (2018), Murder Mystery (2019), and Hubie Halloween (2020). In many of the films, she portrayed minor roles or played the daughter of her father's character. In You Are So Not Invited to My Bat Mitzvah (2023), she had a leading role as Stacy Friedman, earning recognition for her performance.

In 2023, she voiced the character of Summer Chapman in the animated film Leo, a talkative girl who forms a bond with Leo, the class pet voiced by her father.

In 2025, she had a major role as Vienna Gilmore, the daughter of Happy Gilmore in Netflix's Happy Gilmore 2 and a small role in Kinda Pregnant with Amy Schumer.

== Filmography ==
Year	Title	Role	Notes
2010	Grown Ups	Sunny Tardio	
2011	Just Go with It	Girl at Rope Bridge	
2011	Jack and Jill	Little Girl on Ship	
2012	That’s My Boy	Lemonade Stand Kid	
2012	Hotel Transylvania	Additional Voices	Voice
2013	Grown Ups 2	Sunny Tardio	
2014	Blended	Wall Street Stepdaughter	
2015	Pixels	Sweet Scout Girl	
2015	Hotel Transylvania 2	Baby Dennis	Voice
2015	The Ridiculous 6	Dancing Kid	
2016	The Do-Over	Daisy	
2017	Sandy Wexler	Lola	
2018	The Week Of	Eva	
2018	Hotel Transylvania 3: Summer Vacation	Sunny	Voice
2019	Murder Mystery	Brittany	
2020	The Wrong Missy	Lobby Strong Sunny	
2020	Hubie Halloween	Cooky	
2022	Home Team	Brooke	
2022	Hustle	13 Yr Old Girl	
2023	The Out-Laws	Gracie	
2023	You Are So Not Invited to My Bat Mitzvah	Stacy Friedman	
2023	Leo	Summer	Voice
2024	Spaceman	Anna	
2025	Kinda Pregnant	Daisy	
2025	Happy Gilmore 2	Vienna Gilmore	
2025	Jay Kelly	Girl on train	
2026	Don't Say Good Luck	Sophie Birenbaum	
TBA	Grown Ups 3 †	Sunny Tardio	
