= Blended (film) =

2014 film directed by Frank Coraci

- Theatrical release poster
- Directed by: Frank Coraci
- Written by: Clare Sera; Ivan Menchell
- Produced by: Adam Sandler; Jack Giarraputo; Mike Karz
- Starring: Adam Sandler; Drew Barrymore; Kevin Nealon; Terry Crews; Wendi McLendon-Covey
- Cinematography: Julio Macat
- Edited by: Tom Costain
- Music by: Rupert Gregson-Williams
- Production companies: Gulfstream Pictures; RatPac-Dune Entertainment; Happy Madison Productions
- Distributed by: Warner Bros. Pictures
- Release date: May 23, 2014
- Running time: 117 minutes
- Country: United States
- Language: English
- Budget: $40–45 million
- Box office: $128 million

Blended is a 2014 American romantic comedy film starring Adam Sandler and Drew Barrymore as two single parents who went on a blind date together and never wanted to see each other again afterwards. To their surprise, they both end up at the same African safari resort with their children and are forced to stay together. The film was directed by Frank Coraci, and written by Ivan Menchell and Clare Sera. The film's ensemble cast also features Kevin Nealon, Terry Crews, and Wendi McLendon-Covey.

The film was produced by Adam Sandler, Jack Giarraputo, and Mike Karz. It was released theatrically on May 23, 2014. grossed $128 million worldwide, against a budget of $40 million, and received generally negative reviews from critics. This is the third collaboration between Sandler and Barrymore after The Wedding Singer (also directed by Coraci) and 50 First Dates.

== Plot ==
Divorced Lauren Reynolds goes on a blind date with widower Jim Friedman at Hooters, but it ends in disaster. Jim's wife has died from cancer and his three daughters, Hilary "Larry", Espen "ESPN" and Louise "Lou", try to cope with her loss. Lauren's husband Mark cheated on her, which she keeps a secret to her two sons, Brendan and Tyler, who are hostile to her dating again. While Jim struggles with his girls (Hilary is going through puberty and desires a more feminine look; Espen still pretends that her mother is there, and Lou is still young), Lauren struggles with her sons (Tyler is prone to fits of anger, while Brendan, who struggles with the divorce, is also going through puberty).

Jim and Lauren run into each other while on errands at the pharmacy, and the cashier inadvertently switches their credit cards. Jim then goes to Lauren's house to switch them back. Jen, Lauren's friend and co-worker, arrives at Lauren's house to announce that she has broken up with her boyfriend Dick, Jim's boss. Devastated, Jen tells Lauren and, inadvertently, Jim that Dick had planned on taking her on a special trip to Africa. Lauren commits to using Jen's portion of the vacation package, unaware that Jim is simultaneously making the same arrangement with Dick.

When both families arrive at the resort, they are dismayed to see one another and that the hotel room is a romantic suite. At meal-time, the families are put together for a "blended familymoon", where they dine together with other blended families, including the oversexed Eddy and Ginger. Eddy's new bride is said to be his junior, to the chagrin of his teenage son Jake, whom Hilary develops a crush on. The kids make an awkward impression on each other, but they gradually begin to bond with each other and their respective parents.

Jim bonds with the boys by helping Tyler learn how to hit in baseball and managing his anger when he strikes out, as well as teaching Brendan how to box. Meanwhile, Lauren bonds with the girls, helping Hilary change her tomboy-ish look into a more feminine one. During this bonding time, Lauren learns that Jim's deceased wife had managed the Hooters restaurant, suggesting this is why he took Lauren there on their blind date. As they become closer to all the children, Jim and Lauren begin to warm up to each other including when they inadvertently get matched together for a couples' massage and actually have fun with each other.

When Lou asks Lauren to put her to bed, Lauren sings her "Over the Rainbow," which, unbeknownst to her, was a song their mother used to sing to them. The other girls pretend to sleep, while discovering how much they love Lauren. She returns this feeling when she kisses each girl's forehead as she says goodnight. On the last night of the trip, Lauren wears a dress that Jen stole from one of their clients, receiving admiration from everyone. She sits down with Jim for a do-over romantic dinner, which he had especially planned for her. They chat about basic parenting techniques and then move in for a kiss. However, at the last second, Jim pulls away, apologizing and explaining that he is reluctant.

After returning to America, Jim realizes he has fallen in love with Lauren. When he admits this to his daughters, they are ecstatic with the news. Despite not being fully ready to move on from her mother's death, Espen does not want her family to lose Lauren. She announces that her mother is so busy in Heaven, she will not be around so much. At his girls' behest, Jim goes to Lauren's to give her flowers, only to find Mark there. Tyler gets excited to see Jim and wants to play ball; Mark bullies Jim into leaving and implies he is getting back together with Lauren, then ditches Tyler to answer a summons from "work". Mark tries to make a move on Lauren, who rejects him due to his continuous failure as a father and his past affairs.

Lauren and Brendan go to support Tyler at his next baseball game, along with Jen, Dick (whom Jen is back together with), and Dick's five kids, although Mark does not show up. To Lauren's surprise, Jim and his daughters arrive to show encouragement, inspiring Tyler to hit the ball as Jim had taught him in Africa. Jim then finds Lauren and they admit to wanting to be together and kiss, to their kids' delight, who know that they are already a blended family.

== Cast ==
- Adam Sandler as Jim Friedman, Lauren's love interest and later new second husband
- Drew Barrymore as Lauren Reynolds, Jim's love interest and later new second wife
- Bella Thorne as Hilary "Larry" Friedman, Jim's eldest daughter
- Braxton Beckham as Brendan Reynolds, Lauren's elder son
- Emma Fuhrmann as Espen "ESPN" Friedman, Jim's middle daughter
- Kyle Red Silverstein as Tyler Reynolds, Lauren's younger son
- Alyvia Alyn Lind as Louise "Lou" Friedman, Jim's youngest daughter
- Terry Crews as Nickens, leader of the musical group Tathoo's, the resort entertainers
- Kevin Nealon as Eddy Warnick, a tourist from Vancouver
- Jessica Lowe as Ginger Warnick, Eddy's young wife
- Zak Henri as Jake Warnick, Eddy's son
- Amelia Sim as Nancy Parker, Jenny's sister (girl at fountain 1)
- Shanaye Ncube as Jenny Parker, Nancy's sister (girl at fountain 2)
- Wendi McLendon-Covey as Jen Palmer, Lauren's friend and coworker
- Joel McHale as Mark Reynolds, Lauren's ex-husband
- Jackie Sandler as Hollywood stepmom
- Jared Sandler as Jim's store customer
- Abdoulaye N'Gom as Mfana, the trip's tour guide

In addition, Shaquille O'Neal appears as Doug, Jim's coworker; Dan Patrick, longtime anchor of ESPN's SportsCenter, appears as Dick, Jim's boss and Jen's love interest; South African cricketer Dale Steyn plays his fictionalized self; Lauren Lapkus appears as Tracy the babysitter; Mary Pat Gleason appears as a pharmacy cashier; Allen Covert and Alexis Arquette make cameo appearances reprising their roles as Ten Second Tom and Georgina from 50 First Dates and The Wedding Singer, respectively. Sandler's mother, wife, and daughters, Judith, Jacqueline, Sunny, and Sadie, appear in the film.

== Production ==
Wendi McLendon-Covey joined the cast of the film on July 31, 2013; she played Barrymore's character's best friend, who does not have any children. Chelsea Handler was previously cast in this role. On July 31, 2013, Warner Bros. changed the title from Blended to The Familymoon, before reverting to its original title later that year.

=== Filming ===
Principal photography for Blended took place at the Sun City resort in South Africa. Some scenes were filmed near Lake Lanier, Buford, and Gainesville in Georgia, USA. Warner Bros. Pictures co-produced the film with Happy Madison Productions.

== Reception ==
The film was released theatrically on May 23, 2014, by Warner Bros. Pictures.

=== Critical response ===
On Rotten Tomatoes, the film has an approval rating of 15% based on 137 reviews with an average rating of 4.10/10. The site's critical consensus reads, "Lurching between slapstick and schmaltz without showing much of a commitment to either, Blended commits the rare Sandler sin of provoking little more than boredom." On Metacritic, the film has a score of 31 out of 100 based on reviews from 33 critics, indicating "generally unfavorable" reviews. Audiences polled by CinemaScore gave the film an average grade of "A−" on an A+ to F scale.

A. O. Scott, of The New York Times, complained about the film's "retrograde gender politics; its delight in the humiliation of children; its sentimental hypocrisy about male behavior; its quasi-zoological depiction of Africans as servile, dancing, drum-playing simpletons" and concluded "Parents strongly cautioned. It will make your children stupid." Andrew Barker of Variety criticized the film for not trusting its audience "following every unexpectedly smart exchange with a numbskull pratfall or one-liner, and every instance of genuine sincerity with an avalanche of schmaltz." Sheri Linden of The Hollywood Reporter called the film a wholesome family drama, and compared it to the 2005 film Yours, Mine and Ours. Linden praised the lead performances saying "Sandler and Barrymore display an onscreen connection that lends a grounding warmth to the clunkiest comedy setups" and welcomed the interruption by Terry Crews character, although "Like all routines in the film, though, it repeats itself rather than venture into fresher and funnier territory." In summary "This hit-and-miss comedy feels caught between old-school nostalgia and movie-persona growing pains on the part of Adam Sandler." Christy Lemire gave the movie 1.5 stars and stated that while this wasn't Sandler's best performance, "That actor is in there, somewhere. Perhaps Sandler will actually challenge himself again one of these days and set him free." The National's Jocelyn Noveck said, "To say that the new Adam Sandler movie is better than some of his other recent work isn’t saying much" and gave the movie a single star. Hitfix declared Blended is "[Not] Adam Sandler's Worst [film]!"

Gary Goldstein of the Los Angeles Times gave the film a positive review and wrote: "It could have been a bit smarter and a lot shorter, but Blended, the third big-screen pairing for Adam Sandler and Drew Barrymore (after The Wedding Singer and 50 First Dates), is a fun, often funny, largely enjoyable romp." Defending the film for its strong family values, Graham Young of the Birmingham Mail wrote, "It's warm, funny, tender, serious and, despite a couple of teenage references, decidedly old fashioned. There’s no swearing, no pandering to repeated toilet gags and the ‘gross-out’ market is all but ignored. Instead, there's lots of genuinely funny slapstick, singing asides and some great kids’ performances."

=== Box office ===
The film performed poorly at the North American box office; analysts had predicted an opening weekend gross of $30 million but the film grossed just $14.2 million. It finished third at the box office behind X-Men: Days of Future Past and Godzilla. According to Warner Bros., the audience was 56% female and 74% over the age of 25, which indicates that families were not a big part of the opening weekend audience. Cinema Blend called it "one of Adam Sandler's Worst-Ever Openings" comparing it to 50 First Dates which opened to $40 million ten years previously. Dan Fellman Warner Bros.' president of domestic distribution attributed the weak opening to good weather over Memorial Day weekend, but was optimistic based on the A− grade from CinemaScore. Box Office Mojo said it was likely to earn over $50 million.

The film had grossed $46,219,290 in North America and $81,800,000 in other territories for a total worldwide gross of $128 million.

=== Accolades ===
| Award | Category | Recipients | Result | Ref. |
|---|---|---|---|---|
| Golden Raspberry Awards | Worst Actor | Adam Sandler | Nominated | |
| Golden Raspberry Awards | Worst Actress | Drew Barrymore | Nominated | |
| Golden Raspberry Awards | Worst Supporting Actor | Shaquille O'Neal | Nominated | |
| Teen Choice Awards | Choice Movie: Comedy | Blended | Nominated | |
| Teen Choice Awards | Choice Movie Actor: Comedy | Adam Sandler | Nominated | |
| Teen Choice Awards | Choice Movie Actress: Comedy | Drew Barrymore | Nominated | |
| Young Artist Awards | Best Performance in a Feature Film - Young Ensemble Cast | Young Ensemble Cast | Won | |
| Young Artist Awards | Best Performance in a Feature Film - Best Supporting Actress | Emma Fuhrmann | Nominated | |

== Home media ==
Blended was released on DVD and Blu-ray on August 26, 2014, by Warner Home Video. It sold $14,808,893 in DVD sales and $5,619,798 in Blu-ray sales, for a total of $20,428,691.
