= Leo (2023 American film) =

Netflix animated film

- Netflix release poster
- Directed by: Robert Marianetti; Robert Smigel; David Wachtenheim
- Written by: Robert Smigel; Adam Sandler; Paul Sado
- Produced by: Adam Sandler; Mireille Soria
- Starring: Adam Sandler; Bill Burr; Cecily Strong; Jason Alexander
- Edited by: Patrick Voetberg; Joseph Titone
- Music by: Geoff Zanelli (score); Robert Smigel (songs)
- Animation by: Jason Figliozzi (Animation Director)
- Production companies: Netflix Animation Studios; Happy Madison Productions
- Distributed by: Netflix
- Release date: November 21, 2023
- Running time: 102 minutes
- Country: United States
- Language: English

Leo is a 2023 American animated musical comedy film directed by Robert Marianetti, Robert Smigel, and David Wachtenheim (in Marianetti and Wachtenheim's feature length directorial debuts), written by Smigel, Adam Sandler, and Paul Sado, and produced by Sandler and Mireille Soria. The second animated feature from Sandler's production company Happy Madison Productions which came 21 years after Eight Crazy Nights (2002), it stars the voices of Adam Sandler as the titular character, Bill Burr, Cecily Strong, and Jason Alexander, with supporting voice roles provided by Sadie Sandler, Sunny Sandler, Rob Schneider, Jo Koy, Allison Strong, Jackie Sandler, Heidi Gardner, Robert Smigel, and Nick Swardson. The film tells the story of a tuatara longing for the wild and worried about dying who is taken home by different students per the assignment of a strict substitute teacher, but gets himself caught up in the troubles of each student and offers life advice to each of them.

Leo was released by Netflix on November 21, 2023, to generally positive reviews by critics, who praised the animation, vocal performances, and musical numbers.

== Plot ==
Longtime class pets Leo the tuatara and Squirtle the Florida box turtle live in a fifth-grade classroom at a Fort Myers elementary school. During a parent-teacher conference, the pregnant fifth-grade teacher Mrs. Salinas announces her maternity leave. As the parents come to express their displeasure with the substitute teacher whom Principal Spahn (Note: Despite being called Principal Spahn in the film, he is listed in the credits as "Principal".) has selected to cover for Mrs. Salinas, Leo overhears one of them say that tuataras live to be 75 years old and despairs when he realizes he is 74 and has not accomplished his dreams of going to the Everglades.

The next day, the strict substitute Virginia Malkin (Note: Despite her first name being revealed as Virginia, she is listed in the credits as "Ms. Malkin".) arrives where she sends Mrs. Salinas on her way and is quickly loathed by the students.

Leo is taken home for the weekend by Summer, an overly talkative girl. While trying to make his escape, Leo accidentally reveals to Summer that he can talk and suggests to her that she ask more questions to improve her conversations with classmates. As a result, Summer becomes more popular. One by one, her fellow students Eli, Jayda, two boys both named Cole, Skyler, Logan, Mia, Kabir, TJ, Zane, and Anthony take Leo home each weekend, confiding in him with their own issues and concerns, to which he provides wisdom and support, improving each of their lives. However, Leo requests that each student keep his talking ability a secret from the others.

Jealous of the attention Leo is getting, Squirtle decides to expose him. Feeling betrayed, the class disregards Leo. Ms. Malkin takes Leo home when she discovers he talks and has been helping her students. Remembering Ms. Malkin when she was young, Leo learns that she never accomplished her dream of being a real teacher which is why she is always mean to the students and he attempts to give her advice.

The next day, the students win the history fair with their historical figure reenactments with their prize being a field trip to Magic Land Park. Wanting to take all the credit, Ms. Malkin abandons Leo at the Everglades. When the students want to apologize to Leo, Ms. Malkin reports that Leo left them.

As the students travel to Magic Land Park, a guilt-ridden Squirtle uses Eli's drone to catch up with them and reveals that Ms. Malkin lied to which she confesses. The students and Ms. Malkin hijack the bus and head to the Everglades. Meanwhile, Leo learns from wild tuataras that he can live to be over 110 years old, reinvigorating him. Leo is threatened by a congregation of alligators, but is rescued by Ms. Malkin and the students.

On the final day of the school year, Leo tells the class to look out for one another as they enter middle school. Ms. Malkin is given a full-time job as a teacher by Principal Spahn and is promptly assigned to the kindergarteners with Leo and Squirtle as the class pets.

== Voice cast ==
- Adam Sandler as Leo, a 74 to 75-year-old tuatara and a 5th grade class pet. Sandler has stated that the voice he used for Leo was based on his former agent Bernie Brillstein.
- Bill Burr as Squirtle, a Florida box turtle and a 5th grade class pet who is Leo's friend. He is named after Squirtle from the Pokémon franchise.
- Cecily Strong as Ms. Malkin, the strict 5th grade substitute teacher at Fort Myers Elementary School
- Jason Alexander as Jayda's dad, a rich, popular, and influential dermatologist (Note: Despite being called Dr. Jay Wenger in the film, he is listed in the credits as "Jayda's dad".)
- Rob Schneider as the Principal of Fort Myers Elementary School
- Allison Strong as Mrs. Salinas, a 5th grade teacher at Fort Myers Elementary School who goes on maternity leave
- Jo Koy as Coach Kimura, a gym teacher at Fort Myers Elementary School.
- Sadie Sandler as Jayda, a popular student
- Sunny Sandler as Summer, a talkative student
- Coulter Ibanez as Zane, a student who constantly eats Cheetos
- Bryant Tardy and Corey J. as Cole, a student. Tardy provides Cole's low voice while Corey J. provides Cole's high voice. (Note: Despite the closed captioning calling him Cole H. during the student group text scene, he is listed in the credits as "Cole #1".)
- Ethan Smigel as Anthony, a held-back class bully
- Tienya Safko as Skyler, a student who is part of Jayda's circle of friends
- Gloria Manning as Logan, a student who is part of Jayda's circle of friends
- Carson Minniear as Cole #2, a student. (Note: Despite the closed captioning calling him Cole W. during the student group text scene, he is listed in the credits as "Cole #2".)
- Roey Smigel as:
  - Eli, a student who is often sheltered by his overprotective parents
  - Benji, Jayda's younger brother
- Reese Lores as Mia, a huggy student who is a science wiz and has recently-divorced parents
- Benjamin Bottani as Kabir, a transfer student from New York City
- Aldan Liam Philipson as TJ, a student who grew his first back hair.
- Jackie Sandler as Jayda's mom
- Heidi Gardner as Eli's mom
- Robert Smigel as:
  - A drone that follows Eli around on his parents' behalf (Note: Despite being referred to as the Child Safety Hovernator on the phone app owned by Eli's mom, it is listed in the credits as "Drone".)
  - A miniature horse that is among the animals that Leo frees at Jayda's party
  - Old lizard #1
  - Old lizard #3
- Nick Swardson as Cinnabun, a Cinnamon rabbit in a 2nd grade classroom who is constantly renamed every year.
- Lileina Joy as:
  - Hamster Kid #1
  - Hamster Kid #3
  - Featured Vocals
- Elijah Kim as Featured Vocals
- Stephanie Hsu as Skyler's mom
- Ryun Yu as Skyler's dad
- Nicholas Turturro as Anthony's dad
- Rebecca Vigil as Anthony's mom
- Janie Haddad Tompkins as Summer's mom
- Christopher Titone as:
  - Summer's dad
  - Alligator #2
  - Stopwatch #1
- Paul Brittain as:
  - Eli's Dad
  - Stopwatch #2
  - Stopwatch #3
- Tiffany Topol as:
  - Cole #2's mom
  - Zane's mom
- Dan Rietz as Cole #2's dad
- Sunita Param as Kabir's mom
- Sonya Leslie as Logan's mom
- Germar Terrell Gardner as Logan's dad
- Rose Abdoo as:
  - Mia's mom
  - TJ's mom
- Alex Quinjano as Mia's dad
- Christian Capozzoli as TJ's dad
- Sheila Carrasco as Mrs. Wingo
- Doug Dale as:
  - Bubble Guy
  - A goldfish that poops a lot
  - An opossum in the Everglades
- David Wachtenheim as:
  - Frog
  - Old lizard #2
  - Taunting firefly
- Robert Marianetti as Flamingo #1
- Chris Kattan as Alligator #1
- Nora Wyman as an Amazon Echo
- Jonathan Loughran as an animal handler at Jayda's birthday party
- Blake Clark as Golfer #1, a man who was playing golf near Jayda's house
- Joel Marsh Garland as:
  - Camel
  - Golfer #2, a man who was playing golf near Jayda's house
- John Farley as Golfer #3, a man who was playing golf near Jayda's house
- Noah Robbins as:
  - Waiter
  - Magic Land Park Kiosk Attendant
- Frankie Figliozzi as Kayla, Summer's younger sister
- Kyra Wachtenheim as:
  - Torture Montage Kid
  - Benji
- Aliza Pelavin as:
  - Mouse
  - Hamster Kid #2
- Katie Hartman as Road Rage Driver
- Jonny Solomon as Snake

Additional voices by Ava Acres, Ryan Bartley, Ranjani Brow, Nikki Castillo, Mary Deaton, Chase Fein, Giselle Fernandez, Jason Griffith, Ashley Lambert, Terence Mathews, Scott Menville, David Michie, Andrew Morgado, Andre Robinson, Warren Sroka, Kelly Stables, Jaquita Ta'le, and Shelby Young.

== Production ==
In May 2016, it was reported that Adam Sandler would produce (under Happy Madison Productions), write and star in an animated film project. At that time STX Entertainment was attached. Leo was animated by Netflix Animation's Animal Logic. The film's score was composed by Geoff Zanelli.

== Release ==
Leo had a preview at the Annecy International Animation Film Festival on June 14, 2023, before its release by Netflix on November 21, 2023.

== Reception ==
On the review aggregator website Rotten Tomatoes, 84% of 76 critics' reviews are positive, with an average rating of 6.6/10. The website's consensus reads: "Slick animation, catchy songs, and some winning voice work from a cast led by Adam Sandler help Leo strike an uneasy balance between satirical and sweet." Metacritic, which uses a weighted average, assigned the film a score of 65 out of 100, based on 15 critics, indicating "generally favorable" reviews.

=== Accolades ===
Award	Date of ceremony	Category	Recipients	Result
Annie Awards	February 17, 2024	Outstanding Achievement for Editorial	Patrick Voetberg, Joseph Titone, Darrian M. James, Danny Miller, and Brian Robinson	Nominated
Chicago Film Critics Association Awards	December 12, 2023	Best Animated Film	Leo	Nominated
Nickelodeon Kids' Choice Awards	July 13, 2024	Favorite Male Voice From An Animated Movie	Adam Sandler	Won
