= That's My Boy (2012 film) =

2012 film by Sean Anders

- Theatrical release poster
- Directed by: Sean Anders
- Written by: David Caspe
- Produced by: Adam Sandler; Jack Giarraputo; Heather Parry; Allen Covert
- Starring: Adam Sandler; Andy Samberg; Leighton Meester; Milo Ventimiglia; Susan Sarandon; James Caan
- Cinematography: Brandon Trost
- Edited by: Tom Costain
- Music by: Rupert Gregson-Williams
- Production companies: Columbia Pictures; Happy Madison Productions; Relativity Media
- Distributed by: Sony Pictures Releasing
- Release date: June 15, 2012 (United States)
- Running time: 116 minutes
- Country: United States
- Language: English
- Budget: $57.5–70 million
- Box office: $57.7 million

That's My Boy is a 2012 American comedy film directed by Sean Anders, written by David Caspe, and produced by Adam Sandler, Jack Giarraputo, Heather Parry, and Allen Covert. It stars Sandler and Andy Samberg, with Leighton Meester and James Caan. It also stars Vanilla Ice, Tony Orlando, Will Forte, Milo Ventimiglia, and Susan Sarandon in supporting roles. The film follows Donny Berger (Sandler), a middle-aged alcoholic who once enjoyed celebrity status for being at the center of a teacher-student statutory rape case, as he tries to rekindle his relationship with his adult son, Todd Peterson/Han Solo Berger (Samberg), born as the result of that illicit relationship, in hopes that their televised reunion will earn him enough money to avoid going to prison for his tax debts.

Produced by Columbia Pictures and Sandler's Happy Madison Productions in association with Relativity Media, That's My Boy was released in the United States on June 15, 2012, by Sony Pictures Releasing, to a critical and commercial failure, grossing only $57.7 million against a $57.5–70 million budget and was negatively reviewed by critics. It is commonly cited as one of the worst movies ever made.

== Plot ==
In 1984, in Massachusetts, a teenage Donny Berger develops an infatuation with his middle-school teacher, Mary McGarricle. At first, Mary seems repulsed by Donny's flirtations and punishes him with a month of detention. However, during this detention, she unexpectedly seduces Donny, and the two begin a sexual relationship. Their affair is publicly exposed during an auditorium assembly, leading to Mary's conviction for statutory rape. She receives a 30-year prison sentence, while the scandal inadvertently propels Donny into the spotlight as a child celebrity. When Mary becomes pregnant, custody of their unborn child is awarded to Donny's physically abusive father, with the legal provision that Donny will assume full custody once he reaches adulthood.

28 years later, Donny has descended into a life of financial instability, alcoholism, and irresponsibility. He owes $43,000 in back taxes to the Internal Revenue Service (IRS) and faces a potential three-year prison sentence. In a desperate gamble, he places a $20 bet on an 8000:1 underdog in an upcoming race, hoping for a windfall, while also devising a contingency plan if the bet fails. For the past decade, Donny has been estranged from his adult son, who, to escape the stigma of his parents’ scandal, changed his name from Han Solo Berger to Todd Peterson and fabricated a story that his parents had died in an explosion. Todd has since built a successful career as a hedge fund manager and is preparing to marry his fiancée, Jamie, at his boss Steve Spirou's Cape Cod estate.

Meanwhile, Randall Morgan, a television producer familiar with Donny's former celebrity, offers him $50,000 to orchestrate a reunion with Todd and Mary. After reading about Todd's wedding in a newspaper, Donny travels to Cape Cod uninvited. Unprepared for the encounter, Todd introduces Donny as merely an old friend and grows irritated by his father's popularity among the wedding guests. Initially reluctant to confront Mary, Todd softens after Donny manipulates the wedding schedule—convincing Jamie's family to move the rehearsal away from churches and persuading Todd's friends to hold the bachelor party at a strip club. After a night of bonding with Donny, Todd agrees to meet Mary in prison, but when a television crew intrudes on the meeting, he departs in disgust without signing a consent form.

The situation becomes more complicated when Donny discovers Jamie's multiple affairs with Steve and her brother, Chad. Jamie tries to cover her indiscretions by paying Donny $50,000 and offering Todd excuses. Consumed by guilt, Donny interrupts the wedding to reveal the truth and simultaneously discloses his paternal relationship to Todd. The revelation prompts Todd to break off his engagement, embrace Donny as his father, leave his corporate job, and reclaim his birth name, Han Solo.

Afterward, Han begins dating a strip club bartender, Brie, and offers to pay Donny's taxes from his newly built fortune. Donny refuses, choosing instead to take responsibility for his past mistakes. As he prepares to serve his prison sentence and eventually rekindle his relationship with Mary upon release, he discovers that his long-shot bet on the marathon has won $160,000, resolving his IRS debt and allowing him a measure of financial stability for the first time in decades.

== Cast ==
Credits from TV Guide.

- Adam Sandler as Donny Berger
  - Justin Weaver as Young Donny
- Andy Samberg as Han Solo Berger/Todd Peterson, Donny and Mary's son
- Leighton Meester as Jamie Martin, Todd's fiancé
- Vanilla Ice as Himself/Uncle Vanny, Donny's best friend
- James Caan as Father McNally
- Milo Ventimiglia as Chad Martin, Jamie's younger brother
- Blake Clark as Gerald, Jamie and Chad's father
- Meagen Fay as Helen, Jamie and Chad's mother
- Tony Orlando as Steve Spirou, Todd's boss
- Will Forte as Phil
- Rachel Dratch as Phil's wife
- Nick Swardson as Kenny
- Peggy Stewart as Grandma Delores, Steve's mother
- Luenell as Champale, a stripper and Brie's mother
- Ciara as Brie, a bartender and Donny's friend, Todd's secondary love interest
- Ana Gasteyer as Mrs. Ravensdale
- Susan Sarandon as Mary McGarricle, Donny's middle school teacher/lover and Todd's mother
  - Eva Amurri Martino as younger Mary McGarricle
- Todd Bridges as himself
- Dan Patrick as Randall Morgan
- Rex Ryan as Jim Nance
- Jackie Sandler as Masseuse
- Erin Andrews as Randall Morgan's receptionist
- Peter Dante as Dante Spirou, Steve's son
- Alan Thicke as TV version Donny's dad
- Ian Ziering as TV version Donny
- Colin Quinn as Strip club DJ
- Baron Davis as Gym coach
- Dennis Dugan as School janitor

== Production ==
The film was originally titled I Hate You, Dad, and then changed to Donny's Boy before the producers finally settled on That's My Boy. Filming, which began on May 2, 2011 and ended on July 15, 2011, took place in Massachusetts, with studio filming at Columbia Pictures in Culver City, California.

== Release ==
=== Home media ===
That's My Boy was released to DVD and Blu-ray on October 16, 2012, by Sony Pictures Home Entertainment.

== Reception ==
=== Box office ===
That's My Boy opened on June 15, 2012, grossing $13,453,714 in its opening weekend, ranking #4 behind the second weekends of Madagascar 3: Europe's Most Wanted and Prometheus, and the opening of Rock of Ages.

The film grossed $36.9 million in the United States and $57.7 million worldwide, failing to recoup its $57–70 million budget, making it a financial failure.

=== Critical response ===
On Rotten Tomatoes, That's My Boy has an approval rating of 20% based on 110 reviews and an average rating of 3.80/10. The site's critical consensus reads: "While it does represent a new foray into raunch for the normally PG-13 Sandler, That's My Boy finds him repeating himself to diminishing effect – and dragging Andy Samberg down with him." On Metacritic the film has a weighted average score of 31 out of 100 based on reviews from 27 critics, indicating "generally unfavorable reviews". Audiences polled by CinemaScore gave the film an average grade of "B−" on an A to F scale.

Film critic Richard Roeper gave the film an F, calling it "an ugly, tasteless, deadly and mean-spirited piece of filmmaking," and would later call it the worst film of 2012. Justin Chang of Variety called it "a shameless celebration of degenerate behavior, a work of relentless vulgarity and staggering moral idiocy." Half in the Bag called the film "pathetic" and "painful", and went on to criticize Sandler as a comic, suggesting he was unable to create humor that was not based on childish jokes.

The film was criticized for making light of statutory rape, incest, and child neglect.

=== Accolades ===
Award	Category	Recipients	Result
Houston Film Critics Society	Worst Film		Won
33rd Golden Raspberry Awards	Worst Picture		Nominated
33rd Golden Raspberry Awards	Worst Actor	Adam Sandler	Won
33rd Golden Raspberry Awards	Worst Supporting Actor	Nick Swardson	Nominated
33rd Golden Raspberry Awards	Worst Supporting Actor	Vanilla Ice (as himself)	Nominated
33rd Golden Raspberry Awards	Worst Director	Sean Anders	Nominated
33rd Golden Raspberry Awards	Worst Screenplay	written by David Caspe, uncredited rewrites by Adam Sandler, Tim Herlihy, Robert Smigel, David Wain, and Ken Marino	Won
33rd Golden Raspberry Awards	Worst Screen Couple	Adam Sandler and either Leighton Meester, Andy Samberg, or Susan Sarandon	Nominated
33rd Golden Raspberry Awards	Worst Ensemble	The entire cast	Nominated
Teen Choice Awards	Choice Summer Movie: Comedy/Music		Nominated
Teen Choice Awards	Choice Summer Movie Star: Male	Adam Sandler	Nominated
Teen Choice Awards	Choice Summer Movie Star: Female	Leighton Meester	Nominated

== See also ==
- List of 21st century films considered the worst
- Mary Kay Letourneau
- Debra Lafave
