= List of Hotel Transylvania characters =

This is a list of characters that appear in the Hotel Transylvania franchise from Sony Pictures Animation. Almost all the characters are based on traditional monsters (werewolves, vampires, a dhampir, mummies, and Frankenstein's monster, among others).

== Introduced in Hotel Transylvania ==
=== Count Dracula ===
Count "Drac" Dracula (voiced by Adam Sandler in the first three films, Brian Hull in Hotel Transylvania: Transformania and Hotel Transylvania: Scary-Tale Adventures, Brock Powell in Hotel Transylvania 3: Monsters Overboard, David Berni in the TV series' first season, Ivan Sherry in the TV series' second season) is based on the classic character Count Dracula from Bram Stoker's 1897 novel Dracula. He is an Eastern European-accented vampire and the main protagonist of the series. Unlike most incarnations of the character in various media, he has no cravings for human blood. Dracula is shown at the beginning of the first film, devotedly caring for his infant daughter Mavis. He teaches her how to morph into a bat, plays with her and teaches her the things she needs to know, but is also overprotective of her, being reluctant to allow her to explore the outside world, by fear that humans will hurt her, as they did with his late wife Martha. When an older Mavis meets and "Zings" with human Johnny Loughran, he attempts to distance them, but seeing that this hurts Mavis, allows them to begin a relationship and ultimately marry.

In Hotel Transylvania 2, Mavis and Johnny have a half-vampire son, Dennis. Dracula is dismayed when Dennis fails to display vampire characteristics such as morphing into a bat and growing fangs. After he almost kills Dennis while trying to manifest his abilities, an enraged Mavis plans to move herself, Johnny, and Dennis to Los Angeles to distance themselves from the monster community; however, Dracula restores her trust when he helps save Dennis from his father Vlad's bat-like guards. Ultimately, he realizes he loves Dennis, whether he is a vampire or not

In the third movie, he is lonely, and Mavis – mistaking it for stress – arranges for the entire hotel to take a vacation on a monster cruise. Despite the cruise being an elaborate trap set by Abraham Van Helsing, Drac meets and zings with Van Helsing's great-granddaughter Ericka and the two eventually marry.

In the fourth movie, Dracula is now married to Ericka and wishes to retire and give the hotel to Mavis. However, he is fearful that Johnny will ruin the hotel, so he lies to the two of them. Johnny, who decides that Drac will accept him if he is a monster, uses a magic ray to turn himself into a dragon-like monster, but Dracula is turned into a human in the process, breaking the ray. The two of them go to the Amazon Rainforest to find a replacement part for the ray. When Mavis and Ericka find them, Drac admits to lying to Johnny, enraging him, and causing him to mutate further. When all hopes are lost, Drac begs to Johnny to forgive him by telling him that the Dracula family would be incomplete without Johnny, and this makes him happy, allowing Mavis to turn them back to their normal forms. When they all are returning to the hotel in Ericka's airship, they find the hotel completely destroyed. Drac allows Johnny and Mavis to rebuild the hotel.

In the four-year prequel TV series, Drac is away on "official vampire business" at the Vampire Council but appears from time to time as a supporting character. In the final episode, Drac retains a main role where he helps to battle Lycidius Dracula.

=== Jonathan "Johnny" Loughran ===
Jonathan "Johnny" Loughran (voiced by Andy Samberg in the films, Brian T. Stevenson in Hotel Transylvania 3: Monsters Overboard, Danny Gendron in Hotel Transylvania: Scary-Tale Adventures) is the first human inside Hotel Transylvania. He always carries his backpack and shows a strong connection with it. By the end of the first movie he has already integrated into the hotel and is accepted by the clientele. He is portrayed as a good-natured and easy-going slacker. In the first movie, Johnny is lost while traveling in an area close to the hotel and follows a group of zombies to Hotel Transylvania. At first, he thinks he is in a hotel and that everyone is wearing costumes, but he soon realizes that the monsters are real. Drac disguises him as "Johnnystein" (when wearing a Halloween costume, which he mistakenly as a "zombie") and he begins to integrate, meeting and "zinging" with Mavis. After thinking that she would be better off without a human partner he leaves the hotel, but Drac reconsiders and chases the plane Johnny has boarded, bringing him back.

In the second movie, Johnny and Mavis get married and have a son, Dennis. Johnny agrees to take Mavis to California ostensibly to consider moving back home to be near his parents, while Drac tries to prompt Dennis' vampire abilities. Due to his human limitations, Johnny is a background character in the final encounter, but the threat to his life helps Dennis manifest his vampire traits. In the third movie, while he becomes the hotel's event DJ, Johnny also reverts to his slacker lifestyle, embracing the vacation fully. Despite this, he is instrumental in defeating the Kraken, using his portable DJ booth to play up-beat music to calm the monster down, ultimately succeeding with the Spanish song "Macarena".

In the fourth movie, Johnny turns into a dragon-like monster to try and impress Dracula so that he gives his hotel to Mavis and Johnny, but when Johnny realized that Dracula lied about a 'monster real-estate law', he turns upset which progresses his mutation and evolving. Finally, Dracula's motivational and apology speech calms and makes him happy so that Mavis can turn him back into a human. After they return to the hotel and find it completely destroyed, Johnny feels bad for Dracula who is heartbroken and says that they can rebuild the hotel just as it was, but Dracula replies that he and Mavis should rebuild it the way they want to since it is now their hotel. A year later, Mavis and Johnny rebuild and modernize the hotel, which Drac comes to enjoy.

=== Mavis Dracula ===
Mavis Dracula-Loughran (voiced by Selena Gomez as an adult in the films, Sadie Sandler as a child in the first film, Victoria Gomez as a child in the fourth film, Melissa Sturm in Hotel Transylvania 3: Monsters Overboard and Hotel Transylvania: Scary-Tale Adventures, Bryn McAuley in the TV series) is the daughter of Count Dracula and Martha, born in 1894. She is married to Johnny and the mother of Dennis. She is more of a mother-figure to her father and his schemes, as she is more intelligent than him. In Hotel Transylvania, Mavis wants to see the outside world, but Drac has misled her into believing that all humans intend to kill her thus keeping her at the hotel. When she meets Johnny, they zing, becoming a couple and opposes Drac and Johnny fight each other. By the time of the second movie, Johnny and Mavis are married and have a son Dennis. Mavis becomes overprotective of Dennis, going so far as to consider moving to California, Johnny's birthplace, to raise him in a safer environment. In the end, Dennis finally develops his inherent vampire powers and they stay in the hotel.

In the third movie, Mavis thinks that Drac is stressed with running the hotel and arranges a monster cruise for the hotel guests to give him a vacation for a change. But she later figures that Drac has a crush on the captain, Ericka Van Helsing, and this is confirmed when Drac admits he "zinged" with Ericka.

In Hotel Transylvania: Transformania, Mavis figures out Dracula's plan of giving the hotel to her and Johnny. Later, when Drac and Johnny turn into a human and a dragon-like monster respectively, she and her stepmother Ericka confront Ericka's great-grandfather, Abraham Van Helsing who reveals that his Monsterfication Ray caused Drac and Johnny to turn into a human and a monster. So, Mavis and Ericka hop in Ericka's old monster-hunting blimp and drag all the other monsters who have turned into humans and they all go to find Johnny and Drac and reverse the transformation.

In Hotel Transylvania: The Series, which takes place four years prior to the original movie, Mavis is essentially in charge of the hotel while Drac is away on business with the Vampire Council.

=== Frankenstein's Monster ===
Frankenstein's Monster, also called Frankenstein or just Frank for short (voiced by Kevin James in the first three films, Brad Abrell in Hotel Transylvania: Transformania and Hotel Transylvania: Scary-Tale Adventures, Danny Gendron in Hotel Transylvania 3: Monsters Overboard, Paul Braunstein in the TV series), is a monster who lives in an unknown location. Though friendly and caring, Frank is deathly afraid of fire and in the first movie has a habit of mailing himself and his wife everywhere. Since both he and his wife can be disassembled and reassembled at will with no harm to either of them, this is not a problem.

In the second movie, he aids Dracula in his quest to turn Dennis to awaken his vampire lineage and joins the rest of the gang in repelling the attack by Bela and his minions.

In the third movie, when he finds that Drac zinged with Ericka, he - along with Murray the Mummy and Griffin the Invisible Man - fully support Drac in asking Ericka out.

In the fourth movie, Frank turns into a human and he is the only one amongst all who loves his human appearance, or rather his hairstyle. Although Frank regains his human form's hairstyle after returning into his monster form, the said hairstyle is only temporary when his wife, Eunice cuts his hair back to his original hairstyle much to Frank's dismay.

In the prequel TV series, it is revealed that he is the father of Hank N Stein. He has all completely different jobs including but not limited to teacher, farmer, casino manager, Noah, and pet shop salesman.

=== Eunice ===
Eunice (voiced by Fran Drescher in the films, Katie Griffin in the TV series) is Frankenstein's wife. Like Frank, she is deathly afraid of fire and mails herself everywhere. Since both she and her husband can be disassembled and reassembled at will with no harm to either of them, this is not a problem. She speaks with a New York accent.

In the third movie, it is revealed that Eunice disapproves of Frank gambling as he would lose his parts. She found out he did it behind her back when she saw that he has crab claws instead of his original hands.

In the fourth movie, she hates Frank's new hairstyle when he was transformed into a human, he is not to make her plans to divorce. After Frank is restored to normal, Eunice butchers his hair back to its previous length.

In the prequel TV series, it is revealed that she is the mother of Hank N Stein.

=== Wayne ===
Wayne (voiced by Steve Buscemi in the films, Michael Buscemi in Hotel Transylvania 3: Monsters Overboard and Hotel Transylvania: Scary-Tale Adventures) is a werewolf, the husband of Wanda, and the father of Winnie and over 301 wild and undisciplined werewolf pups. He shows dog-like behavior in the second film, and is stressed due to his children causing chaos all the time, but he has little control over them. He tries to keep order, only to be completely ignored by everyone except Winnie. Despite his appearance, his behavior is mostly that of a civilized family man, but he does quickly eat an entire flock of sheep, rationalizing it with "What? You eat lamb chops. It's the same thing."

In the second movie, he joins Drac in his efforts to turn Dennis into a vampire. In the final fight against Bela's goons, he is quickly overrun, but summons his enormous pack of children, who make short work of several of the attackers.

In the third movie he and Wanda enjoy a brief moment of independence after leaving their pups in the Legacy's creche. They are subsequently tranquilized by Ericka and spend the rest of the vacation unconscious in a cleaning cupboard. They then say they enjoyed it so much they've re-booked for the next year as well.

In the fourth movie, Wayne renames himself as Walter, after unknowingly drinking water from a fountain that was accidentally contaminated by Van Helsing's Monsterfication Ray, allowing himself to escape the stress from unable to control his chaotic children and leaves Wanda on her own.

=== Wanda ===
Wanda (voiced by Molly Shannon in the films, Diane Salema in the TV series) is a female werewolf, the wife of Wayne, and the mother of Winnie and the rest of the wolf pups. She is seen in all four movies, and is always shown to be heavily pregnant. Unlike Wayne, she makes little attempt to control her kids' behavior, aside from trying to limit their sugar intake, but is generally more successful than Wayne.

In the fourth movie around the end of the film, Wanda appears to have ended her pregnancy with newborn wolf pups delivered.

=== Griffin ===
Griffin (voiced by David Spade in the films, Daniel Bonjour in Hotel Transylvania: Scary-Tale Adventures) is an invisible man and the only thing that can be seen are his brown glasses. He tends to forget his own invisibility as seen when he is insulted when Dracula says he hates red curly hair (which he had before he became bald, yet is unaware of his hair loss). He also seems concerned with his appearance (later revealed to be middle-aged and pot-bellied), as he becomes embarrassed when Wayne pulls his pants down. Being invisible himself, he never wears clothes and has been naked all the time. He is also seen preparing for Mavis' party in the first film.

At the end of the second film, he bumps into a set of floating pink glasses, showing that he has found an "invisible woman". Griffin is seen driving the hotel's vehicle when necessary.

When he unknowingly drinks water from a fountain that was contaminated by Van Helsing's Monsterfication Ray in the fourth movie, Griffin becomes displeased when seeing his human appearance. After regaining his invisible form, he begins to wear clothes to cover his nudity, at Murray’s insistence. When Griffin's human form was revealed in the first trailers, fans of the series comedically expressed their disappointment on social media sites such as Twitter that he was not given an attractive design. Additionally, a petition to redesign the character reached 2,000 signatures.

=== Murray ===
Murray (voiced by CeeLo Green in the first film, Keegan-Michael Key in the last three films and Hotel Transylvania 3: Monsters Overboard and Kyle Chapple in Hotel Transylvania: Scary-Tale Adventures) is an obese mummy from Egypt who has the power to summon sandstorms or just sand to cast ancient Egyptian curses.

=== Blobby ===
Blobby (voiced by Jonny Solomon in the second film, Genndy Tartakovsky in the third and fourth films) is a green blob monster who speaks blob language and has not seen the outside world until the sequel. He was used to break Johnny's fall in the original movie and was seen in the sauna.

In the sequel, he "hugged" Johnny's mom and was seen on the side of the vehicle, listening to a popular song while Dracula forced everyone else to listen to Bigfoot's life story, which he reads himself on an audiobook, which no one really liked, except for Drac, who was smiling.

In Hotel Transylvania 3: Summer Vacation, Blobby accompanies Drac on a cruise. During the cruise, Blobby gets seasick and spews out a slime that forms into a child. In addition, he also creates a blob version of Tinkles.

In Hotel Transylvania: Transformania, Blobby transforms into a plate of gelatin after he and Drac's friends drink from a fountain that was accidentally contaminated by Van Helsing's Monsterfication Ray, and cause Griffin to carry him during an adventure to fix the ray. Humanized Drac and Dragon-like Monster Johnny search for the ray before Johnny mutates and evolves into a mindless ravenous beast. They return with a new crystal for the ray. In the blimp, Blobby is turned back into a monster.

=== Werewolf Pups ===
The werewolf pups are Wayne and Wanda's pack of at least 324 werewolf pups. Winnie is the only pup identified as a girl amongst them, though she might simply be the only one who wears girl-appropriate clothing. They are always shown causing chaos and destruction while Winnie looks on. Their exact number is unknown; once Winnie said that she has 300 brothers, but there is no way of knowing if that was all of them or just the males. But they are shown to not be completely uncontrollable: while they do not listen to their father at all (except Winnie), they generally do listen to Drac. When he reminds one of the pups to not chew on his cape, the pup even says: "Sorry, Uncle Drac."

The werewolf pups make cameo appearances in the TV series.

==== Winnie ====
Winnie (voiced by Sadie Sandler in the first three films, Zoe Berri in Hotel Transylvania: Transformania and Hotel Transylvania: Scary-Tale Adventures, vocal effects by Evany Rosen in the TV series) is a werewolf pup. She is seen with a pink pacifier in the first film, but she does not have it in the second film. She has a very sensitive sense of smell. Winnie is part of a large family of werewolves. She is suspected to be the only daughter of Wayne and Wanda; she is the only one who wears clothes or colors that suggest such. Once she said she has 300 brothers. Her brothers are always seen causing chaos and destruction. Winnie is less prone to that, but it is observed that she can handle herself against them. Winnie is instrumental in the first film by being able to track Johnny to the airport when he leaves the hotel. Winnie plays a bigger role in the sequel. She has grown up, as she no longer uses a pacifier, is more talkative, and is Dennis’ best friend. At the end of the film, she is threatened by Bela and his pack, becoming one of the reasons Dennis' vampire traits manifest. In Hotel Transylvania 3: Summer Vacation, Winnie helps Dennis sneak Tinkles onto The Legacy, but otherwise has no prominent role. She also has many new brothers and a new sister named Sunny, who is similar to her in many ways. She is shown to have a crush on Dennis and is not coy about it, unlike Dennis himself. Towards the end of the film, she pestered Dennis to "zing" with her. In Hotel Transylvania: Transformania, Winnie is a minor character, and largely hangs out with Dennis throughout the film, playing with Tinkles and the other pets at the hotel. At one point, she and Dennis were hypnotized by Dracula as to not reveal Johnny's monster transformation to Mavis, which was not entirely successful.

==== Sunny ====
Sunny (voiced by Sunny Sandler) is one of the youngest werewolf pups, Winnie's little sister, and Wayne and Wanda's second daughter that first appears in Hotel Transylvania 3: Summer Vacation. Like her big sister, she is much calmer and more mature than her brothers. Sunny's only word in the film is "fish".

==== Wesley ====
Wesley (voiced by Asher Bishop) is a werewolf pup who is named in Hotel Transylvania: Transformania.

==== Wendy ====
Wendy (voiced by Jennifer Kluska) is a werewolf pup who first appears in Hotel Transylvania: Transformania. She is seen being stuck in a hole along with her brothers and complains that Wesley is touching her.

=== Hotel Transylvania staff ===
The Hotel Transylvania staff includes:

==== Quasimodo Wilson ====
Quasimodo "Quasi" Wilson (voiced by Jon Lovitz in the first film, Scott McCord in the TV series) is the chef of the hotel. He would have to put up with Dracula's menu suggestions. Quasimodo despises humans where he even wants to make a dish out of them as well being abusive to a gargoyle waiter. He was the first person besides Dracula to know that Johnny is a human (who wears an ordinary costume). Quasi was frozen by Drac's powers enabling the gargoyle he abused to put Quasi's finger up his nose. With Esmeralda's help, a frozen Quasi announced and revealed Johnny's true identity and nature during Mavis' celebration where the Fly translated his frozen language. Around the end of the film, Quasi is still magically frozen and being licked by Wayne and Wanda's pups.

Although Quasi is not seen or mentioned in the second and third film, he does appear in the video game adaption of the second film where he is now reformed and no longer has issues with humans.

In the prequel TV series, Quasimodo is depicted with yellow hair and puts up with the criticism of his cooking from Mavis, her friends, and Aunt Lydia.

==== Esmeralda ====
Esmeralda is Quasimodo's pet brown rat who can sniff out any humans. After Quasimodo was magically frozen by Dracula, Esmeralda helps him expose Johnny as a human during Mavis' party. It is unknown what happened to Esmerelda afterwards. Although she is not seen or mentioned in the second film, she does appear in the video game adaption where she is now reformed like her owner.

==== Calacas ====
Three Calacas make up Hotel Transylvania's mariachi band.

==== Gargoyles ====
The Gargoyles work as Hotel Transylvania's waiters. One Gargoyle waiter was often abused by Quasimodo.

==== Headless Horseman ====
The Headless Horseman is Hotel Transylvania's designated chauffeur who has a jack-o'-lantern for a head. He is the one who drives the guests to and from Hotel Transylvania in a stagecoach. In the first film, he brings Wayne and Wanda's family to Hotel Transylvania as Wayne warns him that one of his kids left a mess in his car. Johnny later runs into the Headless Horseman causing his jack-o'-lantern head to accidentally be knocked off amidst the panic. The Headless Horseman was seen at the party in the final scene.

In the second film, the Headless Horseman transports Mavis and Johnny to the airport. Later on, he brings Johnny's family to Hotel Transylvania.

In Hotel Transylvania: The Series, the Headless Horseman is replaced by an invisible driver.

==== Sentient Tables ====
The Sentient Tables appear to be normal tables with tablecloths that have faces on them, but they can float and move on their own when given an order. Each of the Sentient Tables are named by their number and moved to whatever numbered position that they are told to go. In addition, they seem to understand the mind of the person who calls them and they can fly quite swiftly to achieve what they are ordered.

==== Shrunken Heads ====
The Shrunken Heads (voiced by Luenell and Jim Wise) are Hotel Transylvania's equivalent to the "Do Not Disturb" signs and are hung on doorknobs, they all say "do not disturb", but also comment on current affairs when they think it appropriate.

==== Suits of Armor ====
The Suits of Armor are a group of possessed suits of armor. They are led by a lead Knight Armor (voiced by Brian George) who reports everything to Count Dracula. They work as Hotel Transylvania's security guards.

==== Witches ====
The Witches are used for Hotel Transylvania's housekeeping and are usually seen cleaning up the mess left behind by the werewolf pups as well as Frank's flatulence.

==== Zombies ====
The Zombies are the hotel's staff and run everything from the front desk clerks and bellhops. One zombie named Mr. Ghouligan (vocal effects provided by Paul Brittain) works as a plumber. They seem to have some sense of how to use technology as they can use smartphones and one of them has a Facebook account.

==== Dragons ====
Two Dragons who breathe fire on the firewood that produces steam for Hotel Transylvania's sauna.

==== Giant Octopus ====
An unseen Giant Octopus uses its tentacle to provide the diving board for Hotel Transylvania's swimming pool.

==== Zombie Bach, Beethoven, and Mozart ====
The zombie versions of Johann Sebastian Bach, Ludwig van Beethoven, and Wolfgang Amadeus Mozart are shown as some of the entertainment at Hotel Transylvania. In the first film, Count Dracula had to break up a fight between them and Frank, Wayne, and Murray over the entertainment dispute. The three zombies are later seen dancing at the party where they occasionally switched heads with each other.

==== Fly ====
The Fly (voiced by Chris Parnell) is the hotel's fitness coordinator. He can also translate any speech even if it is a frozen language.

==== Old Gremlin ====
The Old Gremlin is a slow-moving gremlin who is the activities director at Hotel Transylvania.

=== Hotel Transylvania guests ===
The Hotel Transylvania guests includes:

==== Elderly Gremlin ====
The Elderly Gremlin is a character who has a running gag through the series where she eats something in one bite and says "I didn't do that". At the bingo game, Frankenstein's wife Eunice has won and yells "Bingo!", but then the Elderly Gremlin eats the card. At the charades game, Johnny, who is bored, just like everyone else, takes out his scooter, which the Elderly Gremlin ate. During the part where the monsters are trying to check out, the Elderly Gremlin claimed that Johnny made her eat his scooter.

In the second film, the Elderly Gremlin ate one of the bat people attackers working for Bela and also ate Dennis's birthday cake just as he was going to blow out the candle as she quotes "I didn't do that!"

==== Marty ====
Marty (voiced by Robert Smigel) is a pink gill-man.

==== Bigfoot ====
Bigfoot (voiced by Corey Burton in Goodnight, Mr. Foot) is a recurring guest at Hotel Transylvania. This version is one of the largest monster guests at Hotel Transylvania.

In Goodnight, Mr. Foot, Bigfoot checks into Hotel Transylvania and is bothered by a witch maid which ends with the two of them getting into a pillow fight.

In the first film, the lead Suit of Armor tells Dracula of a clogged toilet in Room 348. Bigfoot is nearby and growls. Dracula quotes to Bigfoot that everybody gets stomachaches. During the gymnasium games, Bigfoot accidentally crushes a zombie.

In the second film, Bigfoot attends Mavis and Johnny's wedding where his tears soak Linda. It was later mentioned by Frank that Bigfoot is doing well in the German's Soccer League.

In the third film, Bigfoot is among the monsters that attend a cruise on the Legacy. At the end of the film, Bigfoot's head is finally seen.

==== Mr. Hydraberg ====
Mr. Hydraberg (voiced by Paul Brittain, Craig Kellman, Brian McCann, Jonny Solomon, and Jim Wise) is a six-headed Hydra that is a recurring guest at Hotel Transylvania and is one of the largest monster guests. He is first seen where he complains to Count Dracula about the room service.

In the second film, Mr. Hydraberg is an attendee at Mavis and Johnny's wedding.

In the third movie, Mr. Hydraberg is a passenger on the Legacy where one of the heads greets Ericka.

==== Mr. Hyde ====
Mr. Hyde is a deformed yellow humanoid with an underbite who is a recurring guest at Hotel Transylvania.

=== Martha ===
Martha (voiced by Jackie Sandler) was Dracula's loving deceased wife, and Mavis' late mother. She had waist-length black wavy hair, pale skin, and light blue eyes as does her child. She was murdered in 1895 by a mob of fearful humans, who staked right through her heart, when Mavis was just an infant. A deleted scene "Love at First Bite" depicts how they first met and the first few times they enjoyed with their infant daughter. A painting of her next to Dracula is hidden by a black veil in the basement, which also contains Dracula's coffin where he sleeps. Johnny recognizes her in the painting and quotes a legend passed on in which she is called "Lady Lubov" by humans. The circumstances of her death have been changed to where she simply disappeared in a mysterious fire, leaving her husband and child behind.

In Hotel Transylvania 2, a picture of her holding an infant Mavis right next to Dracula is seen in her daughter's bedroom on her bedside dresser. She was then given monster ball-soup, which was Martha's own recipe, for her cravings due to her pregnancy. Her young hybrid grandson, Dennis, had asked Dracula whether he misses "Grandma" to which he says that he does every day.

In Hotel Transylvania 3: Summer Vacation, it was since her demise that Dracula had not left the Hotel nor dated another monster female. On his very first human date with Capt. Erica, who is the great-granddaughter of the infamous Van Helsing, Dracula mentioned her to his new zing, explaining why he was so nervous around her.

In Hotel Transylvania: The Series, which is set four years before the original film, Martha was referenced in the season finale "Fangcenera" when Dracula had presented Mavis her mother's blood-red black formal gown for her one hundred-and-fifteenth birthday.

== Introduced in Hotel Transylvania 2 ==
=== Dennis ===
Dennis (voiced by Sunny Sandler as a baby, Asher Blinkoff as a child) is Johnny and Mavis' human/vampire hybrid son, born on Friday the 13th. His grandfather insists on calling him "Dennisovich". He physically resembles Johnny, but has Mavis' blue eyes and vampire abilities which he is still developing. Dennis shows no vampire traits, causing Drac considerable worry, and he attempts several times to force Dennis' vampire abilities to manifest. At Dennis’ fifth birthday party his maternal great-grandfather Vlad dismisses Drac's concerns as Dennis being a "late fanger" – just like Drac was. At the party, Vlad's servant Bela realizes there are humans present and summons his pack to attack them. The hotel guests and humans all band together to defend themselves from the vampire pack. The threat to his family and friends is the necessary catalyst for Dennis and he develops his vampire abilities for the fight, defeating Bela and the pack.

During the animated short Puppy!, Drac gets Dennis a giant puppy named "Tinkles" as a present. In the third film, Dennis and his best friend Winnie smuggle Tinkles aboard The Legacy when the hotel inhabitants all go on vacation. Dennis has only a supporting role, but Tinkles forms part of the assault on the Kraken and Van Helsing's musical DJ booth. Afterwards, Dennis resists looking at Winnie as he is too young to Zing. In the fourth film, Dennis appears as a minor character.

=== Vlad Dracula ===
Vladimir "Vlad" Dracula (voiced by Mel Brooks) is Drac and Lydia's father. He appears in the second film when Mavis invites him to Dennis' 5th birthday party. Drac is worried that Vlad is a "traditional" vampire and will not accept Johnny or his involvement with Mavis and their son. Ironically, Vlad defends Dennis to Drac, supporting the theory that he is a "late fanger" and will show his vampire traits when put under stress. This makes Drac realize he has gone too far forcing Dennis' vampire heritage, and when Vlad discovers Dennis' humanity Drac faces off to his father making Vlad accept Dennis and Johnny as part of the family. Vlad then joins in the fight against Bela and his pack when they attack the party guests at the end of the film.

Vlad appears in the third film in a supporting role, enjoying the holiday on The Legacy, flirting with a group of witches while on the deck. It is implied that he now lives at the hotel with the other guests.

=== Bela ===
Bela (voiced by Rob Riggle) is a vampire bat monster and Vlad's servant. He attacked Winnie and Dennis and threatened to destroy the Hotel Transylvania, enraging Dennis to the point that his vampire abilities manifested. Bela was then severely beaten by the boy. He summoned his fellow vampire bat monsters, but they were driven off by Dracula and his family and friends. Unwilling to give up, Bela attacked Johnny with a spike only to be stopped by Vlad and shrunk to a harmless size as Vlad tells him never to bother him or his family again. He then became a play-thing for the werewolf pups.

He is named after Bela Lugosi, who portrayed Dracula in the film of the same name from 1931, while Bela and his kind are based on the monsters from The Bat People.

=== Crystal ===
Crystal (voiced by Chrissy Teigen) is an invisible woman. She made a cameo appearance in Hotel Transylvania 2 where she meets Griffin and falls in love. In Hotel Transylvania 3: Summer Vacation, she has become Griffin's girlfriend. She is also friends with Eunice, Wanda and Ericka. A running gag in the second film is that none of the other guests believe she exists, thinking it is just Griffin pretending.

=== Loughran family ===
The members of Johnny Loughran's human family includes:

==== Michael Loughran ====
Michael "Mike" Loughran (voiced by Nick Offerman) is Johnny's father.

==== Linda Loughran ====
Linda (voiced by Megan Mullally) is Johnny's mother.

==== Simon and William Loughran ====
Simon and William are two of Johnny and Melly's six brothers.

==== Melly Loughran ====
Melly is Mike and Linda's only daughter and Johnny's younger sister, making her Dennis' paternal aunt.

==== Troy, Connor, and Parker ====
In the sequel, it is shown that Dennis has three older cousins named Troy (voiced by Ethan Smigel), Connor, and Parker. They are first seen at the family dinner where they mention to Dennis that Hotel Transylvania is pretty cool. When they ask him who the coolest monster is (among the monsters at the hotel) and he responds with Kakie, they laugh at him. Later, at Dennis' birthday party when Winnie pins Dennis to the ground and starts licking his face, they tease him for getting "beaten by a girl". Winnie growls at them, scaring them away. They are last seen at the end of the film when Dennis, using his newfound monster powers, defends them from Bela's forces.

=== Harry Three-Eye ===
Harry Three-Eye (voiced by Robert Smigel) is a three-eyed monster magician with tentacles for a moustache.

=== Kakie ===
Kakie (voiced by Chris Kattan) is the "Monster" within a children's television series of the same name of which Dennis is a fan. His main act is reminding kids to share, that too many sweets are bad, and of course eating cake. The actor portraying him is a man named Brandon, who is shown to be indifferent about the act and show. In Hotel Transylvania 2, Johnny and Mavis hire Brandon to perform as Kakie for Dennis' birthday party near the film's climax. While in the middle of his act, he is possessed by Vlad who hopes that possessing Dennis' favorite thing will scare his fangs out. He then grows in a giant, muscular, monstrous version of Kakie which scares Dennis. As Dracula turns Kakie back to normal, Brandon is heard inside the costume proclaiming that none of the parents better review the situation on Yelp.

Kakie is a parody of the Cookie Monster from Sesame Street.

=== Phantom of the Opera ===
Erik the Phantom of the Opera (voiced by Jon Lovitz) is Hotel Transylvania's residential musician who appears in the second film. He is first seen playing melancholy music at Mavis and Johnny's wedding and even played music during the dinner with Mavis and Johnny's family while listening in on their conversation. The Phantom of the Opera later plays music during Dennis' fifth birthday party during the performance of the person performing Kakie. During Dracula's heated argument between Mavis and Jonathan, they get fed up with the Phantom of the Opera playing his music during this time and shout at him to shut up.

=== Dana ===
Dana (voiced by Dana Carvey) is the vampire camp director of Camp Winnepacaca, a vampire camp that Dracula and his friends take Dennis to in order to unlock his vampire abilities. Dracula tried to hypnotize him only for Dana to mention that vampires can't be hypnotized by other vampires.

=== Kal ===
Kal (voiced by Doug Dale) is the owner of a mini-mart in Santa Cruz that Mavis and Johnny visit.

=== Pandragora ===
Pandragora (voiced by Paul Brittain) is a monster with tentacles for hair who lives in Mike and Linda's neighborhood in Santa Cruz.

=== Kelsey ===
Kelsey (voiced by Nick Swardson) is a bearded man in Mike and Linda's neighborhood that Mike and Linda mistake for a werewolf.

== Introduced in Hotel Transylvania 3: Summer Vacation ==
=== Tinkles ===
Tinkles (voiced by Joe Whyte) is a giant puppy and Dennis' pet who first appears in the short Puppy!. In his debut, Tinkles was obtained by Dracula when Mavis and Johnny think that Dennis having a pet is too much of a responsibility. Dennis loves Tinkles very much and he and Winnie are Tinkles' best friends. Tinkles does cause some trouble for Dracula, but as shown in the third movie, he only obeys Drac.

In Hotel Transylvania 3: Summer Vacation, Dennis sneaks Tinkles on the vacation that Mavis plans for Drac. Tinkles later helps in the resistance against Abraham Van Helsing when he takes control of the Kraken.

In Hotel Transylvania: Transformania, Tinkles was affected by the Monstrification Ray where it briefly turned him into a normal puppy.

=== Ericka Van Helsing ===
Ericka Van Helsing (voiced by Kathryn Hahn in the film, Julianne Buescher in the video game Hotel Transylvania 3: Monsters Overboard) is the captain of the monster cruise ship The Legacy and the great-granddaughter of Abraham Van Helsing. Ericka is part of Abraham's plan to kill Drac and all monsters, by taking them on The Legacy to Atlantis where they will all be destroyed by an "Instrument of Destruction", found only in the lost city's ruins. When Drac first sets eyes on Ericka he "zings" with her, causing him distress as he believed a zing was a once in a lifetime occurrence. Despite Van Helsing's plan, Ericka makes several attempts to kill Drac, but starts to see him as a family man rather than a monster. During the climax of the film Ericka professes her love for Drac and rescues him from the Kraken. Back at the hotel Drac proposes to her and she accepts.

In the fourth film, Ericka is married to Dracula. She, along with Mavis and Drac's friends goes to find Johnny and Drac who are in the Amazon rain forest of South America as a monster and human respectively.

=== Abraham Van Helsing ===
Professor Abraham Van Helsing (voiced by Jim Gaffigan) is a former monster hunter and archenemy of Count Dracula, Frankenstein, Wayne, Griffin and Murray. In 1897, Abraham Van Helsing tracked a disguised Drac, Frankenstein, Griffin, Murray and Wayne to a train, but was unsuccessful in killing them. He subsequently tracked Drac down many times, but always failed to defeat him. Many years later, Abraham has avoided death by mechanizing his body to where only his head and hands remained. Abraham has brought his great-granddaughter Ericka into the family business. He has plans to eliminate all the monsters on the cruise upon its arrival at the lost city of Atlantis using an Instrument of Destruction that is to be found in Atlantis's ruins. When at Atlantis, Van Helsing knocks out the DJ upon being given the Instrument of Destruction in the form of some sheet music. When he plays it, the song drives the nearby Kraken into a rage prompting it to attack the monsters. Johnny calms the Kraken using his own DJ booth and inadvertently causes Van Helsing to be knocked off the plinth. Drac rescues him, making him realize monsters are not as he previously thought, and he ceases attempting to kill them including offering refunds to the guests.

In the fourth film, Van Helsing attends the Hotel Anniversary party hosted by Johnny to celebrate the hotel's 125 years. There, he hears Johnny glumly talking about how Dracula never really thought Johnny as part of the family since he is not a monster. Van Helsing offers to help Johnny and uses his new invention, the Monsterfication Ray, to turn Johnny into a dragon-like monster. Later, Van Helsing tells Dracula where to find a new crystal so that the mutation can be reversed.

=== Legacy Fish Crew ===
The Legacy Fish Crew are a group of fish-men with human-shaped feet that work on the Legacy and tend to the guest's need.

==== Stan ====
Stan (voiced by Chris Parnell) is a fishman that works on the Legacy where he runs its Kids' Club. At the end of the film, he is seen checking into Hotel Transylvania.

=== Legacy Passengers ===
The passengers on the Legacy includes:

==== El Chupacabra ====
El Chupacabra (voiced by Jaime Camil) is a chupacabra who appears as a passenger on the Legacy. He is seen ordering drinks with goats in them.

==== Frankenlady ====
Frankenlady (voiced by Tara Strong in the US version, Alison Hammond in the UK version) is the cousin of Frankenstein's Monster from his right hand's side of the family.

==== Kitsune ====
Kitsune is a nine-tailed fox that appears as a passenger on the Legacy.

=== Kraken ===
The Kraken (voiced by Joe Jonas) is a giant tentacled sea monster and the largest monster seen in the franchise. He resides in the waters of Atlantis where he sings to the arriving visitors. Van Helsing uses the Instrument of Destruction to control the evil Kraken into attacking the monsters. It is finally broken free from the Instrument of Destruction's music when Johnny plays the "Macarena."

== Introduced in Hotel Transylvania: Transformania ==
=== Party Monster ===
Party Monster (voiced by Tyler "Ninja" Blevins) is a monster who is seen dancing along with the other monsters at the hotel anniversary.

=== Gigi ===
Gigi is Van Helsing's pet guinea pig. She was used to test the Monsterfication Ray. She gets transformed into a beast with red eyes, pointed fangs and purple skin. In the end, she has fully completed her transformation and due to her large size, she had destroyed the hotel and also ate some of it.

== Introduced in Hotel Transylvania: The Series ==
=== Wendy Blob ===
Wendy (voiced by Evany Rosen) is the daughter of Mr. Blob who first appeared in Hotel Transylvania: The Series. Wendy was born with her pink ponytail and wears glasses. Wendy is friends with the other monster kids. Unlike her father, Wendy is capable of human speech. In the final episode, she was banished.

=== Hank N. Stein ===
Henry "Hank" N. Stein (voiced by Gage Munroe) is the son of Frankenstein and Eunice who first appeared in Hotel Transylvania: The Series and was first referenced in Hotel Transylvania 2. In the final episode of the series, he was banished.

=== Pedro ===
Pedro (voiced by Joseph Motiki) is a fat mummy and one of Mavis' friends who first appeared in Hotel Transylvania: The Series. In the final episode, he was banished.

=== Lydia ===
Lydia (voiced by Dan Chameroy) is Mavis' aunt, and Dracula's older sister. She is extremely strict and does not like fun or anything but order. Lydia first appeared in Hotel Transylvania: The Series when Dracula goes away to the vampire council. She is said to have a bad childhood experience with Christmas. At times, she gets impressed with Mavis when she does something right around Hotel Transylvania.

==== Diane ====
Diane is Lydia's pet chicken.

=== Gene ===
Gene (voiced by Patrick McKenna) is Mavis' great-uncle who first appeared in Hotel Transylvania: The Series. He is mostly seen in his chair playing video games.

=== Mr. Blob ===
Mr. Blob (voiced by Adrian Truss) is the father of Wendy Blob who appeared in Hotel Transylvania: The Series. Whether he is the same character as Blobby is unconfirmed, being very similar to him in appearance, with the exception that Mr. Blob wears a hat and tie.

=== Dr. John Gillman ===
Dr. John Gillman is a gill-man who first appeared in Hotel Transylvania: The Series. He works as Hotel Transylvania's residential doctor.

=== Klaus ===
Klaus (voiced by Carter Hayden) is Mavis' cousin and rival who tries to outdo her at things.

=== Cartwright family ===
The Cartwrights are a family of humans who live near the Hotel Transylvania. They consist of:

- Kitty Cartwright (voiced by Linda Kash) is the matriarch of the Cartwrights.
- Donald Cartwright (voiced by Ryan Belleville) is the patriarch of the Cartwrights.
- "Nosepicker" is Kitty and Donald's baby daughter. Her actual name is unknown, being nicknamed "The Nosepicker" by Mavis and Wendy.
