= Hotel Transylvania 3: Summer Vacation =

2018 Sony Pictures Animation film

- Theatrical release poster
- Directed by: Genndy Tartakovsky
- Written by: Genndy Tartakovsky; Michael McCullers
- Based on: Characters by Todd Durham
- Produced by: Michelle Murdocca
- Starring: Adam Sandler; Andy Samberg; Selena Gomez; Kevin James; David Spade; Steve Buscemi; Keegan-Michael Key; Molly Shannon; Fran Drescher; Kathryn Hahn; Jim Gaffigan; Mel Brooks
- Edited by: Joyce Arrastia
- Music by: Mark Mothersbaugh
- Production companies: Sony Pictures Animation; MRC
- Distributed by: Sony Pictures Releasing (Note: While Sony Pictures Animation is the film's copyright holder, the logo for Columbia Pictures appears in the film's promotional material, but not in the film's opening titles.)
- Release dates: June 13, 2018 (Annecy); July 13, 2018 (United States)
- Running time: 97 minutes
- Country: United States
- Language: English
- Budget: $65–80 million
- Box office: $541.5 million

Hotel Transylvania 3: Summer Vacation (Note: Also released internationally as Hotel Transylvania 3: A Monster Vacation and marketed domestically as Hotel Transylvania 3) is a 2018 American animated horror-comedy film directed by Genndy Tartakovsky and written by Tartakovsky and Michael McCullers. Produced by Sony Pictures Animation, it is the third film in the Hotel Transylvania franchise. Adam Sandler, Andy Samberg, Selena Gomez, Kevin James, David Spade, Steve Buscemi, Keegan-Michael Key, Molly Shannon, Fran Drescher, and Mel Brooks reprise their roles from previous installments, with Kathryn Hahn and Jim Gaffigan joining the cast. In the film, Dracula finds love with a ship captain named Ericka while on a vacation on a luxury cruise liner with his family and friends, but it is revealed that she is actually the great-granddaughter of his arch-nemesis, Abraham Van Helsing.

The film was announced in November 2015. Tartakovsky confirmed his return in June 2016 after receiving inspiration from a "miserable" family vacation and the Chevy Chase National Lampoon's Vacation movies. The title was revealed in November 2017.

Hotel Transylvania 3: Summer Vacation premiered at the Annecy International Animation Film Festival on June 13, 2018, and was theatrically released in the United States on July 13. The film received mixed-to-positive reviews from critics and grossed $541 million against a budget of $65–80 million, making it the highest-grossing film in the series. A further sequel, Hotel Transylvania: Transformania, was released in 2022, while a spin-off series, Motel Transylvania, is scheduled to premiere on Netflix in 2027.

== Plot ==
In 1897, Dracula and his friends travel in disguise on a train to Budapest, the capital of the Hungarian part of Austria-Hungary. However, Drac's arch-nemesis Professor Abraham Van Helsing boards the train and unveils the monsters; the monsters escape by climbing through the roof, and Drac pushes his friends off the train for their safety. Van Helsing becomes obsessed with destroying Drac but is constantly outsmarted by him.

In the present day, one year after the second film, Drac is running his hotel business smoothly with Mavis and Johnny. Drac is depressed that he has remained single since his wife's death despite his attempts to meet someone. Misinterpreting this as stress from overwork, Mavis books a cruise so they can all take a break and spend more time together as a family. Drac, Johnny, Mavis, Dennis, Vlad, and the hotel guests board a cruise ship called Legacy. Drac sees the ship's captain, Ericka, and falls in love with her at first sight, something that he thought was impossible as he had already "zinged" before.

Ericka afterwards goes to a private and secret room on the lower decks where she meets up with Abraham van Helsing, secretly her great-grandfather. Van Helsing has almost entirely mechanized his body to avoid death and has a plan to eliminate all the monsters: on the cruise's arrival at the lost city of Atlantis, he will use an Instrument of Destruction in Atlantis' ruins. Van Helsing makes Ericka promise to not assassinate Drac beforehand, but she makes repeated unsuccessful attempts to do so anyway. Drac's friends hear Ericka complain about her inability to get him and misinterpret this as a sign of affection. Drac nervously asks Ericka out on a date, and she accepts since she sees this as another opportunity to kill him. As they dine on a deserted island, Ericka unexpectedly begins to fall in love with Drac, after they learn about each other's pasts where they lost their loved ones – for Drac, it was his beloved Martha, and for Ericka, it was her parents.

Mavis discovers her father is interested in Ericka and becomes suspicious of her motives. The cruise ship reaches Atlantis, which has been converted into a casino. Drac decides to tell Mavis the truth about Ericka but gets distracted seeing Ericka enter an underground crypt. Drac follows her, with Mavis not far behind, and learns that Ericka is after a "family heirloom". With Drac's help, she evades the booby traps around the object and escapes. Mavis arrives and confronts them, and Drac confesses that he "zinged" with Ericka, to Mavis's surprise and confusion. After Ericka is told what a "zing" is, her inner guilt about lying to Drac forces her to reject his feelings for her, leaving Drac heartbroken and Mavis feeling guilty.

A regretful Ericka gives Van Helsing the heirloom, and he sets a trap for the monsters at a dance party. Noticing that Drac is still depressed about Ericka, Mavis takes advice from Johnny and tells her father to talk to Ericka, who admits that she was afraid of him leaving her, which allays Drac's fears. Van Helsing shows up and pushes away the DJ and a saddened Ericka is forced to reveal that she is his great-granddaughter. Van Helsing reveals that the heirloom is the Instrument of Destruction — a case for a music note sheet — and plays a song that drives a friendly Kraken living near the island to attack the monsters. Drac tries to stop the evil Kraken but gets injured. Ericka saves Drac from the evil Kraken and pleads with her great-grandfather to stop the destruction, confessing her love for Drac. This infuriates Van Helsing, and he attacks them both.

To pacify the Kraken, Johnny opens up a portable DJ kit and plays positive songs to beat Van Helsing's song. Upon playing Macarena, the Kraken is relaxed and happy for good. Van Helsing is unable to counter the song as the humans and monsters begins to dance, including the music sheet, which rips itself to pieces during the process. When Van Helsing also dances, he accidentally slips and falls, but Drac saves him. Touched by the act of kindness, Van Helsing apologizes to the monsters and gives everybody a full refund for the cruise, before sending them back. Meanwhile, back at the hotel, Drac proposes to Ericka, who gets tongue-tied at the question before accepting.

== Voice cast ==
- Adam Sandler as Count "Drac" Dracula, Mavis' father, Count Vlad's youngest son, and Dennis’ maternal grandfather. Centuries after the demise of his beloved wife Martha, he ultimately falls for a human woman and proposes to her. This is the last film in the franchise where Sandler voices Dracula before Brian Hull took over the role for the next film.
- Kathryn Hahn as Ericka Van Helsing, the captain of the Legacy cruise, Dracula's love interest, and the great granddaughter of Abraham Van Helsing.
- Jim Gaffigan as Professor Abraham Van Helsing, Ericka's great grandfather and Dracula's former rival.
- Selena Gomez as Mavis Dracula-Loughran, Drac's daughter, Johnny's wife, and Dennis' vampire mother, from whom he inherited his vampire abilities which he first developed on his fifth birthday, as do all pureblood vampires.
- Andy Samberg as Jonathan "Johnny" Loughran, Mavis' husband, Dracula's son-in-law, and Dennis' human father.
- Kevin James as Frankenstein, Drac's friend who hangs with Murray. This is the last film in the franchise where James voices Frankenstein before Brad Abrell took over the role for the next film.
- David Spade as Griffin The Invisible Man who is friends with Drac, Frank, Wayne, and Murray.
- Steve Buscemi as Wayne, a werewolf who is friends with Drac, Frank, Murray and Griffin.
- Keegan-Michael Key as Murray, a mummy who hangs with Frank. Murray was previously voiced by CeeLo Green in the first film.
- Molly Shannon as Wanda, Wayne's werewolf wife who is friends with Eunice.
- Fran Drescher as Eunice, Frank's wife who is friends with Wanda.
- Asher Blinkoff as Dennis "Dennisovitch" Dracula-Loughran, Mavis and Johnny's dhampir son, Dracula's grandson, and Winnie's love interest. He has his mother's blue eyes and extraordinarily strong vampire abilities, and his father's orange hair and freckles.
- Mel Brooks as Count Vlad, an ancient, more experienced and traditional vampire who is Dracula's father, the late Martha's father-in-law, Mavis' paternal grandfather, Jonathan's grandfather-in-law, and Dennis' maternal great-grandfather. Since the end of the third movie, he is Ericka's father-in-law.
- Sadie Sandler as Winnie, the werewolf daughter of Wayne and Wanda. She is Dennis' best friend and mutual love interest. She is later voiced by Zoe Berri in the next film.
- Chris Parnell as Stan, a fish-man that works on the Legacy. Parnell previously voiced The Fly in the first two films.
- Joe Whyte as:
  - Tinkles, Dennis' giant pet puppy.
  - Bob, one of the Gremlins who works as a co-pilot on Gremlins' airlines.
- Joe Jonas as Kraken, a giant music-loving sea monster that lives near Atlantis.
- Chrissy Teigen as Crystal, an invisible woman who is Griffin's new girlfriend.
- Genndy Tartakovsky as:
  - Blobby, a green blob monster. He was previously voiced by Jonny Solomon in Hotel Transylvania 2.
  - Blobby Baby, a spawn of Blobby.
  - Puppy Blobby, Blobby Baby's pet and another spawn of Blobby.
- Tara Strong as Frankenlady (voiced by Alison Hammond and credited as Frankenginger in the UK release), a female whose right arm is related to Frank from his right hand's side of the family.
- Jaime Camil as El Chupacabra, a passenger on the Legacy.

Additionally, Tartakovsky, Whyte, Strong, and Teigen also reprised their roles in the French, German, Spanish, Italian, Russian, Polish, and Romanian language dubs of the movie.

== Production ==
=== Development ===
In September 2015, Michelle Murdocca, the film's producer, said before the second film's release that the studio was "talking about number 3 and moving forward and taking the franchise to the next level," but thought that she and director Genndy Tartakovsky would not return, since they were working on Tartakovsky's Can You Imagine? before that project was later shelved. That same month, Tartakovsky stated that he will not return for the sequel, specifying to TheWrap that "two is enough. I have a lot of other ideas, and I kind of have to express them and have them come out." In November 2015, Sony Pictures Animation announced that the third film, under the tentative title of Hotel Transylvania 3, had been set for release on September 21, 2018.

Despite leaving the series, Tartakovsky later announced that he would return as the director for the third installment. Adam Sandler, Selena Gomez, and Andy Samberg also reprised their previous roles, as Dracula, Mavis, and Johnny, respectively, and the film was written by Tartakovsky and Austin Powers writer Michael McCullers. In June 2016, Sony also confirmed Tartakovsky's return, after his taking a leave of absence to work on the final season of his show Samurai Jack. According to Tartakovsky, he returned after he received inspiration from a "miserable" family vacation, and from the Chevy Chase National Lampoon's Vacation movies, as the film takes place aboard a cruise ship. By early November 2017, the film had been entitled Hotel Transylvania 3: Summer Vacation.

One of the biggest challenges for the animation team was creating the massive Kraken character and simulating the water effects and destruction caused by the massive creature.

== Soundtrack ==
Mark Mothersbaugh returned to score the third film, having previously scored the first two installments, while Sony Classical Records has released an official soundtrack of the trilogy. Dutch DJ Tiësto also provided music for the film's climax – "Tear It Down" for the disco party, and "Seavolution" and "Wave Rider" for Van Helsing's Kraken brain-washing music; these were all released separately from the soundtrack. DNCE's song "Cake by the Ocean" and Pitbull's song "Shake Senora" were used in promotional material. Eric Nam recorded the song "Float" for the film. "I See Love" performed by Jonas Blue featuring Joe Jonas was featured in the film's end-credits, while Joe Jonas also recorded "It's Party Time" for the film while he was voicing the Kraken. Bruno Mars' song "24K Magic" was also provided for the scene when Dracula dances on the cruise ship as Ericka makes attempts on his life and a fishman (voiced by Chris Parnell) sings a cover version of "Downtown" on stage in another scene.

== Release ==
=== Theatrical ===
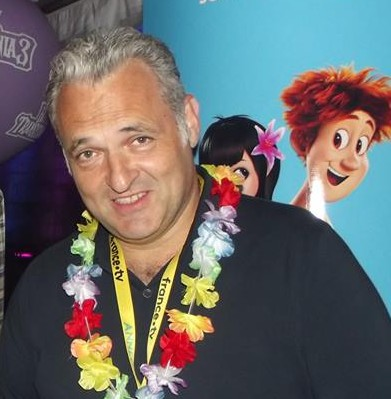
On June 13, 2018, director Genndy Tartakovsky presented an almost complete version of the film at Annecy International Animation Film Festival.

Summer Vacation was originally scheduled for release on September 21, 2018, a date that was later moved up two months earlier to July 13 as Sony rescheduled Goosebumps 2: Haunted Halloween for the original date instead. On June 21, 2018, Amazon announced it was offering its Amazon Prime members an early showing of the film on June 30, at about 1,000 theaters, similar to fellow Sony release Jumanji: Welcome to the Jungle the previous December.

=== Home media ===
Summer Vacation was released on DVD, Blu-ray and 4K Ultra HD Blu-ray on October 9, 2018, by Sony Pictures Home Entertainment.

In April 2021, Sony signed a deal giving Disney access to their legacy content, including past Hotel Transylvania films to stream on Disney+ and Hulu and appear on Disney's linear television networks. Disney's access to Sony's titles would come following their availability on Netflix.

== Reception ==
=== Box office ===
Summer Vacation has grossed $167.5 million in the United States and Canada, and $374 million in other territories, for a total worldwide gross of $541.5 million against a production budget of $65–80 million. On September 1, 2018, the film surpassed its predecessor, Hotel Transylvania 2, to become Sony Pictures Animation's highest-grossing film worldwide to be completely animated (and second-highest overall behind 2011's The Smurfs) until it was overtaken by Spider-Man: Across the Spider-Verse in 2023; Spider-Man: Into the Spider-Verse would later surpass Hotel Transylvania 2 to become SPA's highest-grossing film domestically in 2019 until it was also overtaken by its sequel in 2023.

In the United States and Canada, Summer Vacation was released alongside the opening of Skyscraper, as well as the wide expansion of Sorry to Bother You, and was projected to gross $38–45 million from 4,267 theaters in its first weekend. The film made $1.3 million from its early 3PM screenings held by Amazon on June 30, and $2.6 million from screenings beginning at 5PM the Thursday before its official release. It went on open to $44.1 million, finishing first at the box office and landing in-between the debuts of the first two Hotel Transylvania films. The film made $23.2 million in its second weekend, finishing second behind newcomers The Equalizer 2 and Mamma Mia! Here We Go Again. It made another $12.3 million in its third weekend, finishing fourth.

=== Critical response ===
On the review aggregator website Rotten Tomatoes, 62% of 119 critics' reviews are positive, with an average rating of 5.5/10. The website's critical consensus reads, "Hotel Transylvania 3: Summer Vacation delivers exactly what fans will expect – which means another 97 agreeably lightweight minutes of fast-paced gags and colorful animation." It is the highest rated film of the Hotel Transylvania franchise on Rotten Tomatoes. Metacritic, which uses a weighted average, assigned the film a score of 54 out of 100, based on 23 critics, indicating "mixed or average" reviews. Audiences polled by CinemaScore gave the film an average grade of "A−" on an A+ to F scale, the same score earned by both its predecessors.

IGN gave the film score of 7.6 out of 10, saying, "Hotel Transylvania 3: Summer Vacation is mostly funny, BLAH-blah-BLAH!" Jamie Righetti of IndieWire wrote, "With plenty of laughs, truly dazzling animation, and some more of the franchise's signature dance sequences, Hotel Transylvania 3: Summer Vacation is a summer treat worth savoring, and a reminder that if we can see past our differences, we'll find we're not that different after all."

Conversely, Scott Tobias of Variety gave the film a negative review, stating, "That leaves Hotel Transylvania 3 to look too much like another lackadaisical gathering of Sandler and his frequent on-screen chums, like a PG-rated Grown Ups at sea." Brian Lowry of CNN wrote, "Creatively, though, unlike the best animated franchises, whatever sense of discovery, surprise or ingenuity that Hotel Transylvania originally offered appears pretty well behind it." Geoffrey Macnab of The Independent gave it 2 out of 5 stars, saying "In its scattergun way, parts of the film are funny and very inventive. The hitch is that the storytelling feels so utterly random."

Scott Mendelson of Forbes gave the film a mixed review, saying "The movie looks great, there are a few chuckles, and the kids may enjoy it. But compared to its predecessors, Hotel Transylvania 3 is mostly blah (blah blah)." Brian Tallerico of RogerEbert.com wrote, "Hotel Transylvania 3 gets enough of that right to allow it to stand above the truly abysmal summer animated offerings of recent years... It's not that bad. It's more forgettable than painful." Chris Nashawaty from Entertainment Weekly gave the film a B−, saying "The harmless high jinks all go down easily enough without being particularly memorable or pushing the art form past the expected." Rafer Guzmán of Newsday stated, "In the end, the noisy humor and classic rock songs drown out whatever worthy messages Hotel Transylvania 3 might offer."

=== Accolades ===
Award	Date of ceremony	Category	Recipient(s)	Result	Ref.
Annie Awards	February 2, 2019	Outstanding Achievement for Animated Effects in an Animated Production	Patrick Witting, Kiel Gnebba, Spencer Lueders, Joe Pepper, Sam Rickles	Nominated	
Annie Awards	February 2, 2019	Outstanding Achievement for Directing in an Animated Feature Production	Genndy Tartakovsky	Nominated	
Annie Awards	February 2, 2019	Outstanding Achievement for Production Design in an Animated Feature Production	Scott Wills	Nominated	
Kids' Choice Awards	March 4, 2023	Favorite Animated Movie	Hotel Transylvania: Transformania	Nominated	
Kids' Choice Awards	March 4, 2023	Favorite Male Voice from an Animated Movie	Adam Sandler	Won	
Kids' Choice Awards	March 4, 2023	Favorite Male Voice from an Animated Movie	Andy Samberg	Nominated	
Kids' Choice Awards	March 4, 2023	Favorite Female Voice from an Animated Movie	Selena Gomez	Won	
People's Choice Awards	November 11, 2018	The Family Movie of the Year	Hotel Transylvania: Transformania	Nominated	
St. Louis Film Critics Association Awards	December 16, 2018	Best Animated Film	Genndy Tartakovsky	Nominated	

== Video game ==
A video game based on the film, titled Hotel Transylvania 3: Monsters Overboard, was released for Microsoft Windows, Nintendo Switch, PlayStation 4, and Xbox One on July 10, 2018. It was developed by Torus Games and published by Outright Games. While Keegan-Michael Key was the only one to reprise his role from the film, the rest of the cast consists of Brock Powell as Count Dracula, Melissa Sturm as Mavis, Michael Buscemi as Wayne, Julianne Buescher as Ericka, Danny Gendron as Frank, and Brian T. Stevenson as Johnny. Margaret Tang voice directs the video game.

== Future ==
=== Sequel ===
In February 2019, Sony Pictures Animation announced that a fourth film was in development and was scheduled to be released on December 22, 2021. In October 2019, Tartakovsky announced he would not direct the film. In April 2020, it was announced that it would be moved up to August 6, 2021. In September 2020, it was announced that Jennifer Kluska and Derek Drymon would replace Tartakovsky as director, although he would still be involved as producer and screenwriter, as well as Selena Gomez reprising her role as Mavis, and serving as executive producer of the film. In April 2021, the film's official title was revealed, Hotel Transylvania: Transformania, and the film's release date was moved up again to July 23, 2021, before moving to October 1, 2021. That same day, Sony confirmed that Adam Sandler would not be returning to voice Dracula in the film and would be replaced by YouTube voice impressionist Brian Hull. It was also announced that Kevin James would not be reprising his role as Frankenstein, and the role would be given to Brad Abrell. In August 2021, Sony was in discussions to cancel the film's theatrical plans and release it direct-to-streaming, in response to the SARS-CoV-2 Delta variant surges in the United States and the low box office turnouts of Black Widow and The Suicide Squad. On October 6, Amazon Studios acquired the distribution rights to the film for $100 million, and released it exclusively on Prime Video on January 14, 2022, worldwide, excluding China, where Sony would handle a theatrical release.

=== Television series ===
Motel Transylvania was announced in June 2024 by Netflix as part of the streamer's slate of animated projects underway. The series is set to focus on Dracula and Mavis opening a motel.
