= Asher Blinkoff =

American actor

- Occupation: Actor
- Years active: 2012–present
- Father: Saul Andrew Blinkoff

Asher Blinkoff is an American voice actor. He is best known for his role as Dennis in the Hotel Transylvania film franchise for Columbia Pictures and Sony Pictures Animation.

== Career ==
Asher Blinkoff is the son of Marion and Saul Andrew Blinkoff. Blinkoff made his feature film debut at age 6 in Hotel Transylvania 2. He also voiced in various films such as The Jungle Book, Sing 2, and others.

In 2015, he was nominated for a Daytime Emmy Award for his role in the animated short "Taking Flight".

== Personal life ==
Blinkoff has an older sister named Meira who is a voice actress. He is an Orthodox Jew.

== Filmography ==
Films

Year	Title	Voice role	Notes
2012	Wake-up Call (For Him)	Himself	Short film
2012	Wake-up Call (For Her)	Baby	Short film
2015	Taking Flight	Tony	Short film
2015	Hotel Transylvania 2	Dennis	Voice
2016	Bling	Minitar	Voice
2016	The Jungle Book	Wolf Pup	Voice
2017	Puppy!	Dennis	Voice; short film
2018	Hotel Transylvania 3: Summer Vacation	Dennis	Voice
2019	Red Shoes and the Seven Dwarfs	Wooden Bear Cub	Voice
2021	Sing 2	Piglet	Voice
2022	Hotel Transylvania: Transformania	Dennis	Voice
