= Jennifer Kluska =

American film director, screenwriter, and storyboard artist

- Occupations: Film director; Screenwriter; Storyboard artist
- Years active: 2015–present
- Notable work: DC Super Hero Girls; Hotel Transylvania: Transformania

Jennifer Kluska is a Canadian-American film director, screenwriter, and storyboard artist best known for her work on DC Super Hero Girls (2018) and Hotel Transylvania: Transformania (2022).

== Career ==
In 2015, Kluska began her career by serving as a storyboard artist on Hotel Transylvania 2. In 2018, she again served as a story artist for Hotel Transylvania 3: Summer Vacation. In the same year, Kluska directed her first short film #TheLateBatsby, which screened in theaters before the movie Teen Titans Go! To the Movies. The film led to Kluska directing multiple episodes of the television series DC Super Hero Girls, which debuted at the 2018 San Diego Comic-Con. Kluska gained notability when she signed on to co-direct Hotel Transylvania: Transformania, with animator Derek Drymon. In April 2021, she directed the short film Monster Pets, which is part of the Hotel Transylvania franchise. In June 2022, she was originally hired to direct an upcoming Ghostbusters animated film, before being replaced by Kris Pearn. By July 2026, she was set to direct The Haunting of Hotel Transylvania (2027), the sequel to her previous film Hotel Transylvania: Transformania.

== Filmography ==
Year	Title	Credited as			Notes & ref(s)
Year	Title	Director	Writer	Storyboard artist	Notes & ref(s)
2015	Hotel Transylvania 2	No	No	Yes	
2018	Hotel Transylvania 3: Summer Vacation	No	No	Yes	
2018	#TheLateBatsby	Yes	No	No	Short film
2018	DC Super Hero Girls	Yes	No	No	Episodes: "#SheMightBeGiant" and "#FromBatToWorse"
2021	Monster Pets	Yes	Yes	No	Short film
2022	Hotel Transylvania: Transformania	Yes	No	No	
2026	Goat	No	No	Yes	
2027	The Haunting of Hotel Transylvania	Yes	No	No	
