= Hotel Transylvania: Transformania =

2022 Sony Pictures Animation film

- Promotional release poster
- Directed by: Derek Drymon; Jennifer Kluska
- Screenplay by: Amos Vernon; Nunzio Randazzo; Genndy Tartakovsky
- Story by: Genndy Tartakovsky
- Based on: Characters by Todd Durham
- Produced by: Alice Dewey Goldstone
- Starring: Andy Samberg; Selena Gomez; Kathryn Hahn; Jim Gaffigan; Steve Buscemi; Molly Shannon; David Spade; Keegan-Michael Key; Brian Hull; Fran Drescher; Brad Abrell; Asher Blinkoff; Tyler "Ninja" Blevins; Zoe Berri
- Edited by: Lynn Hobson
- Music by: Mark Mothersbaugh
- Production companies: Columbia Pictures; Sony Pictures Animation; MRC
- Distributed by: Amazon Studios (Note: excludes China (Sony Pictures Releasing))
- Release date: January 14, 2022
- Running time: 87 minutes
- Country: United States
- Language: English
- Budget: $75 million
- Box office: $18.5 million

Hotel Transylvania: Transformania (Note: Also known as Hotel Transylvania 4: Transformania or simply Hotel Transylvania 4) is a 2022 American animated monster horror comedy film directed by Derek Drymon and Jennifer Kluska, in their directorial debuts, and written by Amos Vernon, Nunzio Randazzo, and Genndy Tartakovsky. Produced by Sony Pictures Animation, it is the fourth installment in the Hotel Transylvania film franchise, and stars the voices of Andy Samberg, Selena Gomez, Kathryn Hahn, Jim Gaffigan, Steve Buscemi, Molly Shannon, David Spade, Keegan-Michael Key, Brian Hull, Fran Drescher, Brad Abrell, Asher Blinkoff, Tyler "Ninja" Blevins and Zoe Berri. The film follows Dracula and his son-in-law Johnny as they travel to South America to locate a crystal that can reverse a transformation spell before its effects become permanent.

Originally scheduled for theatrical release in the United States on October 1, 2021, the film's release was cancelled due to the COVID-19 pandemic. Sony Pictures sold distribution rights to Amazon Studios for $100 million. The film was released on Amazon Prime Video on January 14, 2022, and received mixed reviews from critics. Originally intended to be the final film in the franchise, a fifth film, titled The Haunting of Hotel Transylvania, is scheduled to be released on October 8, 2027.

== Plot ==
During Hotel Transylvania's 125th anniversary celebration, Dracula is planning to retire and leave the hotel to Mavis and Johnny. Mavis overhears this and tells Johnny who excitedly tells Dracula his plans to renovate the hotel. Worried about Johnny ruining the hotel, Dracula lies that there is a "monster real-estate law" which only lets monsters own the hotel, leaving him disappointed.

Professor Abraham Van Helsing decides to help Johnny by using a ray powered by a crystal that turns humans into monsters and vice versa. After testing it on his guinea pig Gigi, he uses it on Johnny who turns into a dragon. Learning about Johnny's monster form, Dracula tries to turn him back to normal but accidentally turns himself into a human, breaking the ray's crystal in the process. Van Helsing tells Dracula and Johnny that they can turn themselves back to normal by getting another crystal in the Cave of the Reflexión in South America, so Dracula and Johnny set off to do so.

Dracula's friends Frank, Wayne, Griffin and Murray end up becoming humans as well, as a result of drinking from a fountain that was contaminated by the ray. After learning about Dracula and Johnny's whereabouts on the news, Mavis and Ericka confront Van Helsing, but they are attacked by Gigi. Van Helsing discovers that the effects of the ray are unstable, as the monster transformation will keep mutating until the subject becomes a mindless beast. The rest of the gang head to South America to find Dracula and Johnny.

While traveling through South America, Dracula and Johnny begin to bond. During a camp-out, Johnny teaches Dracula about how if he only sees the worst in things, he will miss out on the best parts. Dracula begins to confess that he lied about the monster real-estate law, but the rest of the group finds them, interrupting him. Things turn sour when Dracula admits his deception regarding passing over the hotel to Mavis and Johnny. This prompts an upset Johnny to believe Dracula does not consider him family and to mutate further before running away.

Mavis goes to find Johnny while Dracula and the rest of the gang go to the Cave of the Reflexión. Mavis finds Johnny, but the transformation has turned him very volatile. She leads him to the cave where they finally find the crystal. When Mavis tries to turn Johnny back to normal, the ray fails to work, as Johnny has been a monster for too long. Dracula lets himself get captured by Johnny and tells him he now sees him as family. This brings Johnny back to his senses, allowing Mavis to return him to normal.

With Dracula and his friends finally back to normal, they return home, only to find that the hotel has been destroyed by Gigi. Dracula decides to let Mavis and Johnny rebuild the hotel to their liking. One year later, Mavis and Johnny have rebuilt and modernized the hotel.

== Voice cast ==
- Brian Hull as Count "Drac" Dracula, the founder of Hotel Transylvania and Mavis' father, Johnny's father-in-law, Dennis' maternal grandfather and Ericka's husband. In the previous films, he was voiced by Adam Sandler, who was unavailable to return for the fourth installment due to scheduling conflicts.
- Andy Samberg as Jonathan "Johnny" Loughran, Mavis' husband, Dracula's son-in-law, Ericka's stepson-in-law and Dennis' father
- Selena Gomez as Mavis Dracula, Johnny's wife, Dracula's daughter, Ericka's stepdaughter and Dennis' mother
  - Victoria Gomez voices a young Mavis Dracula, as well as Wilma, a werewolf who is the daughter of Wayne and Wanda
- Kathryn Hahn as Ericka Van Helsing, Dracula's wife and the great-granddaughter of Abraham Van Helsing
- Brad Abrell as Frankenstein, Eunice's husband. He was originally voiced by Kevin James in the first three films.
- Steve Buscemi as Wayne, a werewolf and Wanda's husband
- David Spade as Griffin, an invisible man
- Keegan-Michael Key as Murray, an ancient mummy
- Fran Drescher as Eunice, Frankenstein's wife
- Molly Shannon as Wanda, a werewolf and Wayne's wife
- Jim Gaffigan as Professor Abraham Van Helsing, a former monster hunter, Dracula's great-grandfather-in-law and ex-nemesis and Ericka's great-grandfather who invented the "Monsterfication Ray"
- Asher Blinkoff as Dennis, the dhampir son of Johnny and Mavis, Vlad's great-grandson, Ericka's step-grandson and Dracula's grandson
- Zoe Berri as Winnie, a werewolf who is the daughter of Wayne and Wanda and Dennis' best friend. She was originally voiced by Sadie Sandler in the first three films.
- Asher Bishop as Wesley, a werewolf who is the son of Wayne and Wanda
- Tyler "Ninja" Blevins as Party Monster
- Genndy Tartakovsky as Blobby, a green blob monster
- Jennifer Kluska as Wendy, a werewolf who is the daughter of Wayne and Wanda
- Derek Drymon as a zombie that was briefly turned into a human

== Production ==
In February 2019, Sony Pictures Animation announced that a fourth Hotel Transylvania film was in development. In October of that year, Genndy Tartakovsky confirmed that he would not return to direct. In September 2020, Jennifer Kluska and Derek Drymon were announced as directors. Kluska had worked as a storyboard artist on earlier sequels, while Drymon had previously worked on series such as Rocko's Modern Life, CatDog, SpongeBob SquarePants, and Adventure Time. Tartakovsky stayed on as screenwriter and executive producer, joined by Selena Gomez, who also voiced the character Mavis. Production was carried out remotely during the COVID-19 pandemic.

In April 2021, the film's title was revealed as Hotel Transylvania: Transformania, and it was confirmed to be the final entry in the franchise. That same month, Sony announced that Adam Sandler would not reprise his role as Dracula. The role was taken over by Brian Hull, who had voiced the character in the short film Monster Pets. Kathryn Hahn, Steve Buscemi, David Spade, and Keegan-Michael Key returned to voice their characters, and in May 2021, Brad Abrell was announced as the new voice of Frankenstein, replacing Kevin James. Lynn Hobson served as the film's editor.

== Soundtrack ==
Mark Mothersbaugh returned to compose the score for the film, continuing his work from the previous three installments. The official soundtrack was released by Sony Classical on January 14, 2022. An original song featured in the end credits, “Love Is Not Hard to Find,” was written by Morien van der Tang, Faried Arween Jhauw, Glen Faria, and Jheynner Argot, and performed by Yendry. It was also released on January 14, 2022.

== Release ==
Hotel Transylvania: Transformania was released by Amazon Studios on Prime Video on January 14, 2022. In February 2019, Sony Pictures Releasing had originally scheduled the film for a theatrical release on December 22, 2021. The release date was later moved to August 6, 2021, then advanced again to July 23, 2021, and subsequently delayed to October 1, 2021, due to the COVID-19 pandemic.

In August 2021, Sony Pictures cancelled the film's planned theatrical release and entered discussions to sell the distribution rights to a streaming platform, citing rising cases of the SARS-CoV-2 Delta variant in the United States. On August 16, 2021, it was reported that Amazon Studios was negotiating to acquire global streaming rights (excluding China) for $100 million. Under the agreement, Amazon would release the film exclusively on Prime Video, while Sony retained home entertainment and linear television rights. On October 6, 2021, Amazon confirmed the release date as January 14, 2022, coinciding with the tenth anniversary of the original Hotel Transylvania film.

Although primarily released via streaming, the film had a limited theatrical release on February 25, 2022. It later opened in Chinese theaters on April 3, 2022.

=== Home media ===
Hotel Transylvania: Transformania was released on Blu-ray, DVD, and Digital HD on August 15, 2023, by Sony Pictures Home Entertainment.

== Reception ==
=== Critical response ===
On the review aggregator website Rotten Tomatoes, Hotel Transylvania: Transformania holds an approval rating of 47% based on 77 reviews, with an average rating of 5.1/10. The website's critical consensus reads: "Much like the trio of films it follows, Hotel Transylvania: Transformania is middling family viewing — relatively painless, but overall rather uninspired." Metacritic assigned the film a weighted average score of 46 out of 100 based on 15 critics, indicating "mixed or average" reviews.

Meagan Navarro of Bloody Disgusting rated the film 2.5 out of 5 stars, noting it "never gets as complex as its moral center suggests, therefore never really rising above a wholesome, exuberant amusement ride". Tomris Laffly of Variety wrote that the film is "yet another wearisome tale that inelegantly depicts themes like acceptance, understanding, and diversity within a saga that has always been rather clumsy with its messaging around such weighty topics". John DeFore of The Hollywood Reporter stated "Transformania remains sufficiently goofy-sweet to please its target demo; those who find the humor toothless should at least appreciate the distinctive animation, which can be as energetically wacky as classic Looney Tunes."

=== Accolades ===
Award	Date of ceremony	Category	Recipient(s)	Result	Ref.
Children's and Family Emmy Awards	December 10–11, 2022	Outstanding Special Class Animated Program	Alice Dewey Goldstone, Selena Gomez, Michelle Murdocca, Genndy Tartakovsky	Nominated	
Children's and Family Emmy Awards	December 10–11, 2022	Outstanding Sound Editing and Sound Mixing for an Animated Program	Various (Note: Tateum Kohut, Will Files, Nerses Gezalyan, Nerseh Gezalyan, Katie Halliday, Dominick Certo, Curt Schulkey, James Morioka, Matt Cavanaugh, Justin Davey, Diego Perez, Ryan Sullivan, Greg Ten Bosch, Matt Yocum, Gouen Everett, Robin Harlan, Sarah Monat)	Nominated	
Kids' Choice Awards	March 4, 2023	Favorite Animated Movie	Hotel Transylvania: Transformania	Nominated	
Kids' Choice Awards	March 4, 2023	Favorite Voice from an Animated Movie (Male)	Andy Samberg	Nominated	
Kids' Choice Awards	March 4, 2023	Favorite Voice from an Animated Movie (Female)	Selena Gomez	Won	

== Future ==
=== Television series ===
Although Hotel Transylvania: Transformania was made as the final entry to the franchise, in June 2024, Motel Transylvania, a television series set to debut on Netflix in 2025, was announced. The series is set to focus on Dracula and Mavis opening a motel. In August 2025, it was revealed that Genndy Tartakovsky is involved with the series. On October 30, 2025, it was revealed that the release date of the series would be pushed back to sometime in 2027.

=== Sequel ===
In September 2024, while interviewed by Collider due to his forthcoming attendance to the SCAD AnimationFest to be honored with an Award of Excellence, Tartakovsky was asked about the likelihood of a fifth Hotel Transylvania film. He said that he thinks Sony may want more films if there is a demand for it, acknowledging how well Transformania performed during its Prime Video release, opining that they would have to wait and see. In January 2026, during an interview with Keegan-Michael Key at the 83rd Golden Globe Awards, he confirmed that he was about to start work on a fifth film titled The Haunting of Hotel Transylvania, which was given a release date of October 8, 2027.
