= Hotel Transylvania 2 =

2015 American film by Genndy Tartakovsky

- Theatrical release poster
- Directed by: Genndy Tartakovsky
- Written by: Robert Smigel; Adam Sandler
- Based on: Characters by Todd Durham
- Produced by: Michelle Murdocca
- Starring: Adam Sandler; Andy Samberg; Selena Gomez; Kevin James; David Spade; Steve Buscemi; Keegan-Michael Key; Molly Shannon; Fran Drescher; Mel Brooks
- Edited by: Catherine Apple
- Music by: Mark Mothersbaugh
- Production companies: Columbia Pictures; Sony Pictures Animation; LStar Capital; MRC
- Distributed by: Sony Pictures Releasing
- Release date: September 25, 2015
- Running time: 89 minutes
- Country: United States
- Language: English
- Budget: $80 million
- Box office: $475.2 million

Hotel Transylvania 2 is a 2015 American animated horror-comedy film directed by Genndy Tartakovsky and written by Robert Smigel and Adam Sandler. Produced by Columbia Pictures and Sony Pictures Animation, it is the second installment in the Hotel Transylvania franchise and the sequel to the 2012 film. Sandler, Andy Samberg, Selena Gomez, Kevin James, David Spade, Steve Buscemi, Molly Shannon and Fran Drescher reprise their roles from the first film, with Keegan-Michael Key (replacing CeeLo Green from the first film), Asher Blinkoff, Megan Mullaly, Nick Offerman, Dana Carvey and Mel Brooks joining the cast.

The film takes place several years after the events of the first film. Mavis and Johnny have a young son named Dennis, whose lack of any vampire abilities worries both the former and his maternal grandfather Dracula for differing reasons. When the couple travel to Johnny's hometown in Santa Cruz, California, Drac calls his friends to help him make Dennis a vampire, much to Mavis's dismay.

Hotel Transylvania 2 was released theatrically on September 25, 2015, by Sony Pictures Releasing. The film received mixed reviews and grossed $475 million worldwide on an $80 million budget. It won a Kids' Choice Award for Favorite Animated Movie. A further sequel, Hotel Transylvania 3: Summer Vacation, was released in 2018.

== Plot ==
After the events of the first film, Mavis and Johnny are finally married with the approval of her father, Count Dracula. One year after the wedding, Mavis reveals to Drac that she is now pregnant and later gives birth to an infant boy whom the couple name Dennis, nicknamed “Denisovich” by Dracula.

As Dennis's fifth birthday is around the corner, he has yet to grow his fangs and Drac worries that his grandson might not gain vampire powers. Noticing the potential dangers her son might face living in Transylvania, Mavis starts to consider moving to Johnny's hometown in California in order to give Dennis a more “normal” childhood, much to Drac's disapproval. Drac tells Johnny, who does not want to leave the hotel either, to take Mavis to California to visit his parents to keep her distracted and dissuade her from moving, leaving Drac to "babysit" Dennis.

Convinced that Dennis is a "late fanger", Drac enlists his friends to help Dennis to become a vampire, but every attempt they try fails. Drac and the gang then go to Mavis' childhood summer camp, only to sneak away after Drac finds out that the camp has become much safer and kid friendly. Drac tries hurling Dennis from a tall but yet unstable tower to pressure the latter’s transformation into a bat, but he fails to transform and Drac flies down and rescues him at the last second. Afterwards, Frank ends up knocking the tower over, causing it to collapse onto the campfire, setting him on fire, causing him to panic and run out of control, which sets the camp ablaze.

Meanwhile, in California, Mavis enjoys exploring more of the human world. When she and Johnny arrive at his parents' house, Johnny's mother, Linda, unsuccessfully attempts to make Mavis feel more comfortable by covering her room with some Halloween decorations and inviting other monster/human couples over. Feeling like a stranger, Mavis retreats up to the roof and Johnny tells her that if they stay together, Dennis will live normally, persuading her to stay at the hotel. However, Johnny then discovers a video of Dennis falling that was filmed by the campers, and he and Mavis go back to Transylvania, with Drac and his friends reaching the hotel at the same time. Mavis verbally berates Dracula for endangering Dennis and proclaims that they will move out of the hotel after Dennis’s fifth birthday.

The night before the party, Drac hosts Johnny's family, and finds out that Mavis had invited his father Vlad. As he is more hateful of humans than he was, Drac tells Johnny to have his family disguise themselves as monsters. The next day, Vlad arrives with his bat-like servant Bela and meets Dennis for the first time. Believing that fear will cause Dennis' fangs to sprout, Vlad possesses a stage performer named Brandon, dressed as Dennis' favorite TV monster Kakie to frighten him. When Drac sees Dennis frightened of the possessed Kakie, Drac shields his grandson at the last moment, realising that it was not worth it, and frees the performer from Vlad's control. Mavis mistakenly believes that Dracula was responsible for the ruse, and while the family argues about whether or not Dennis could be happy in California, an upset Dennis flees the hotel and enters the forest, being followed by Wayne's daughter Winnie, who has a mutual crush on him.

Irritated with Vlad, Johnny and his family reveal themselves, and an irate Vlad reprimands Drac for accepting humans before Drac rightly tells Vlad that he's a fool for not accepting Dennis as family just for being half-human, reconciling with Mavis. Upon hearing that Dennis is a hybrid, Bela attacks him and Winnie in their treehouse and abducts them. When Bela injures Winnie and threatens to destroy the hotel, Dennis' anger causes him to instantly grow his fangs and develop his vampire abilities, and he attacks Bela. A furious Bela calls his giant-bat army, but Drac and the rest of the monsters team up to defeat Bela's gang and drive them away, while Bela is shrunk by Vlad after making an attempt to kill Johnny. Vlad has been won over by Drac's claim that humans and monsters now coexist peacefully. With Dennis finally embracing his vampire abilities, Drac happily convinces Johnny and Mavis to continue raising him in Transylvania, and they resume the party with his friends and family.

== Voice cast ==
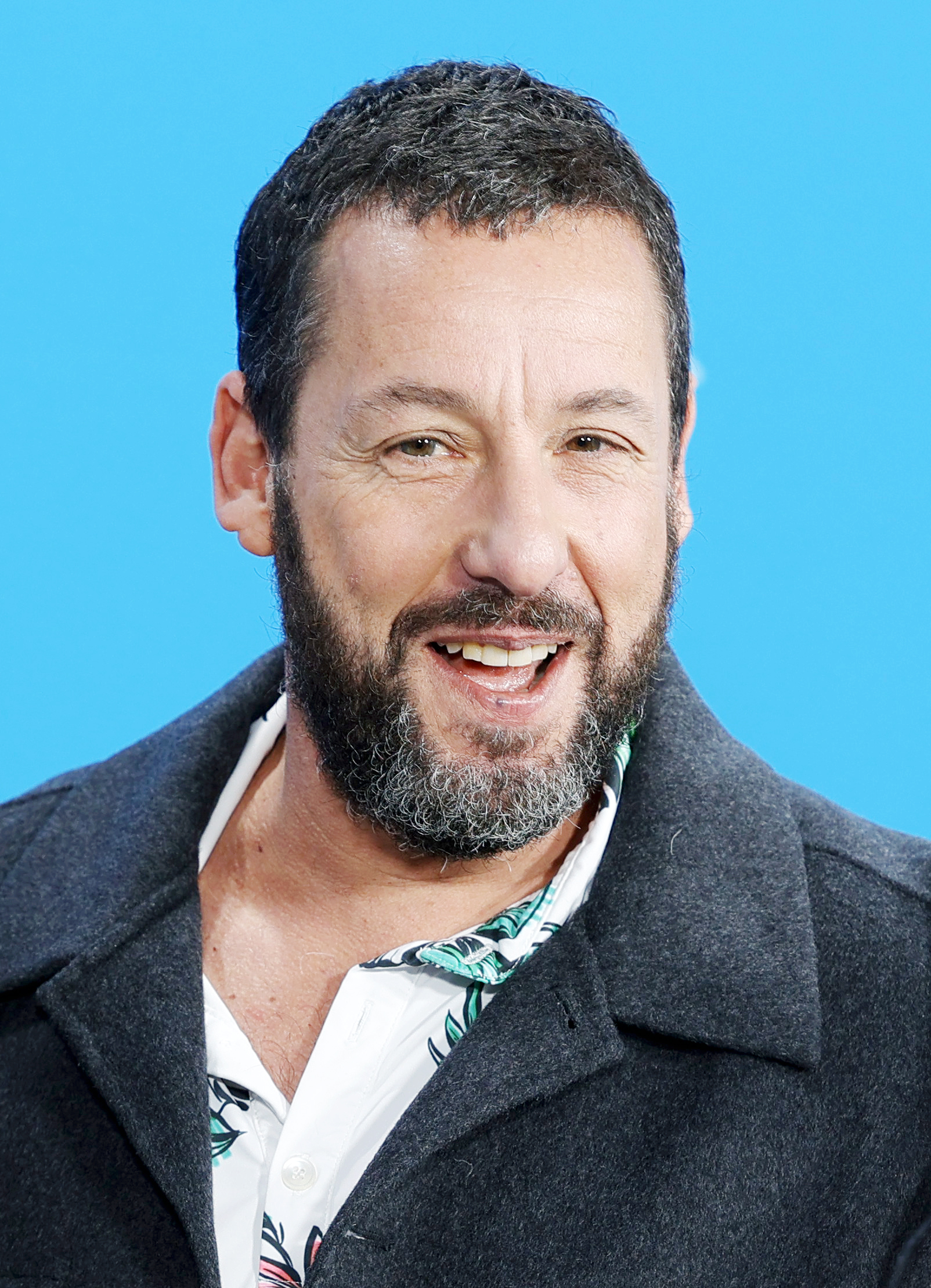
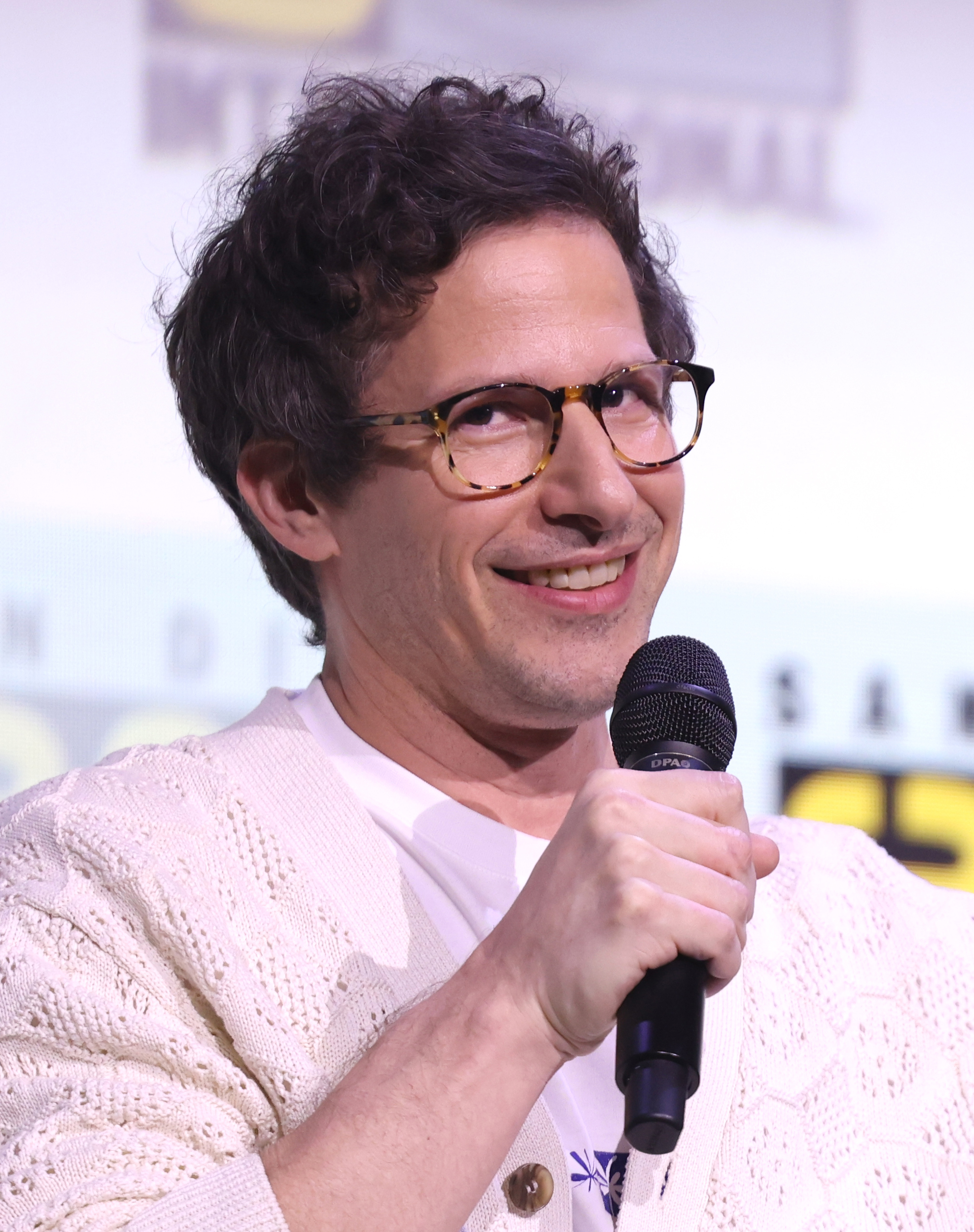
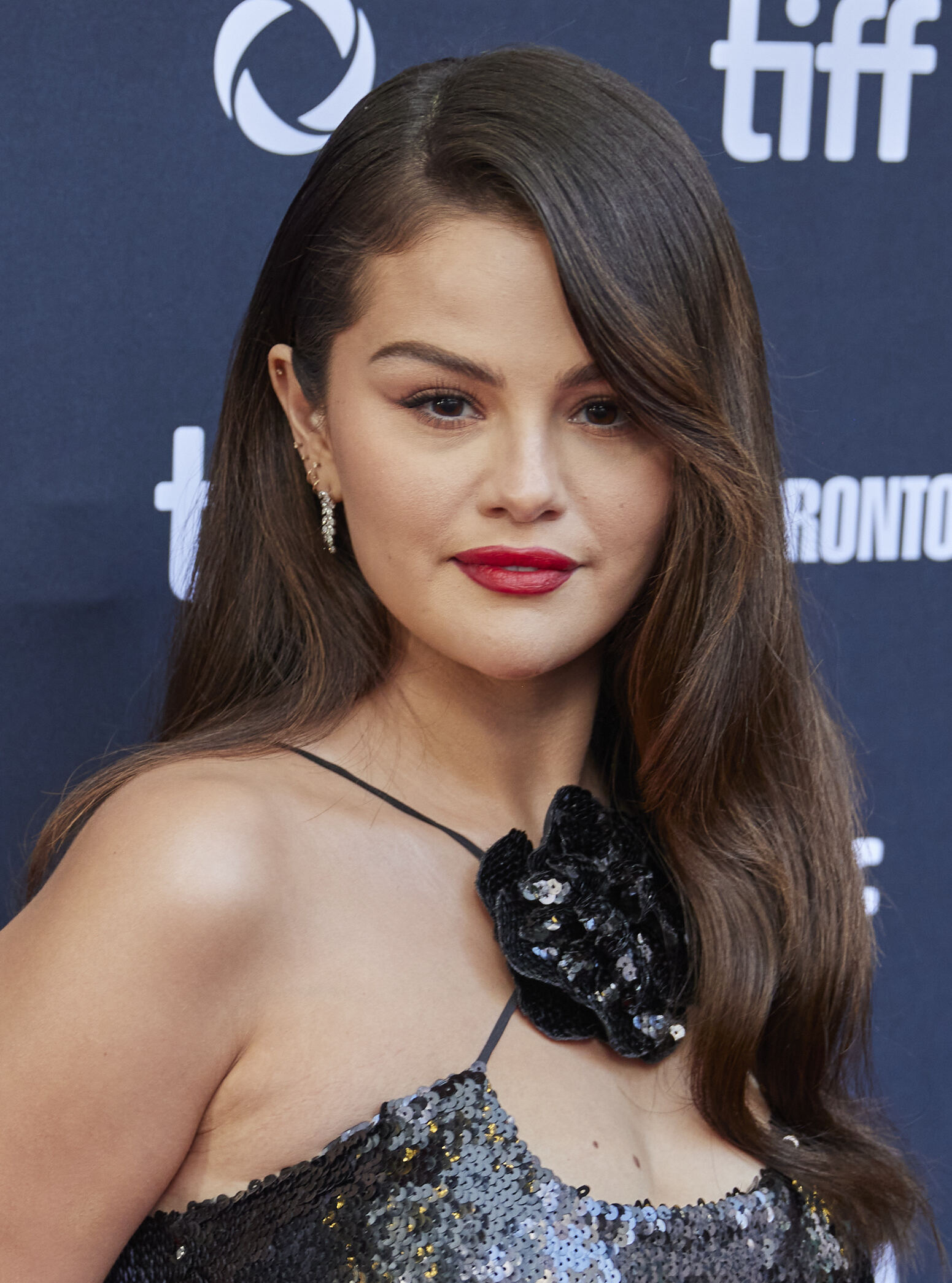
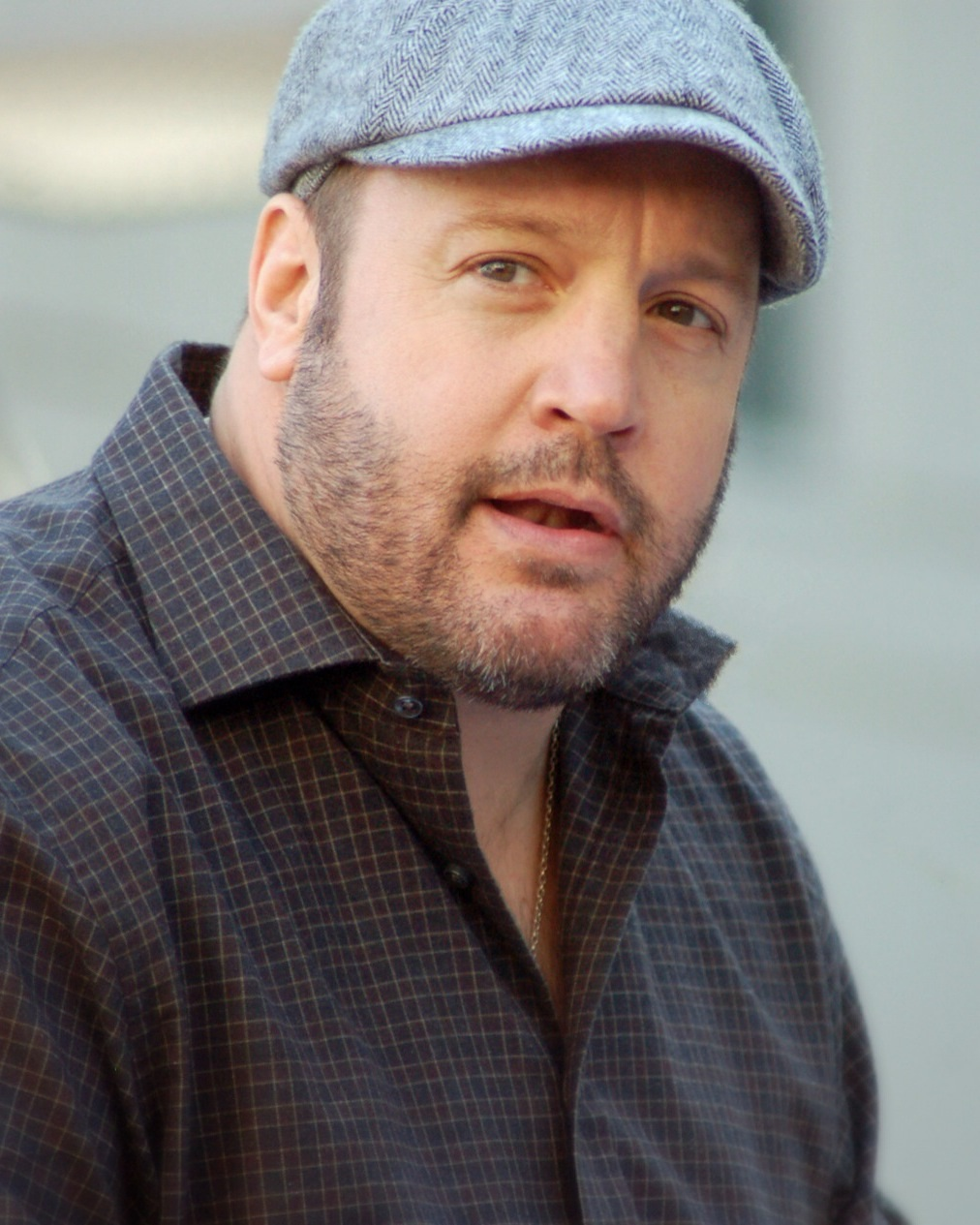
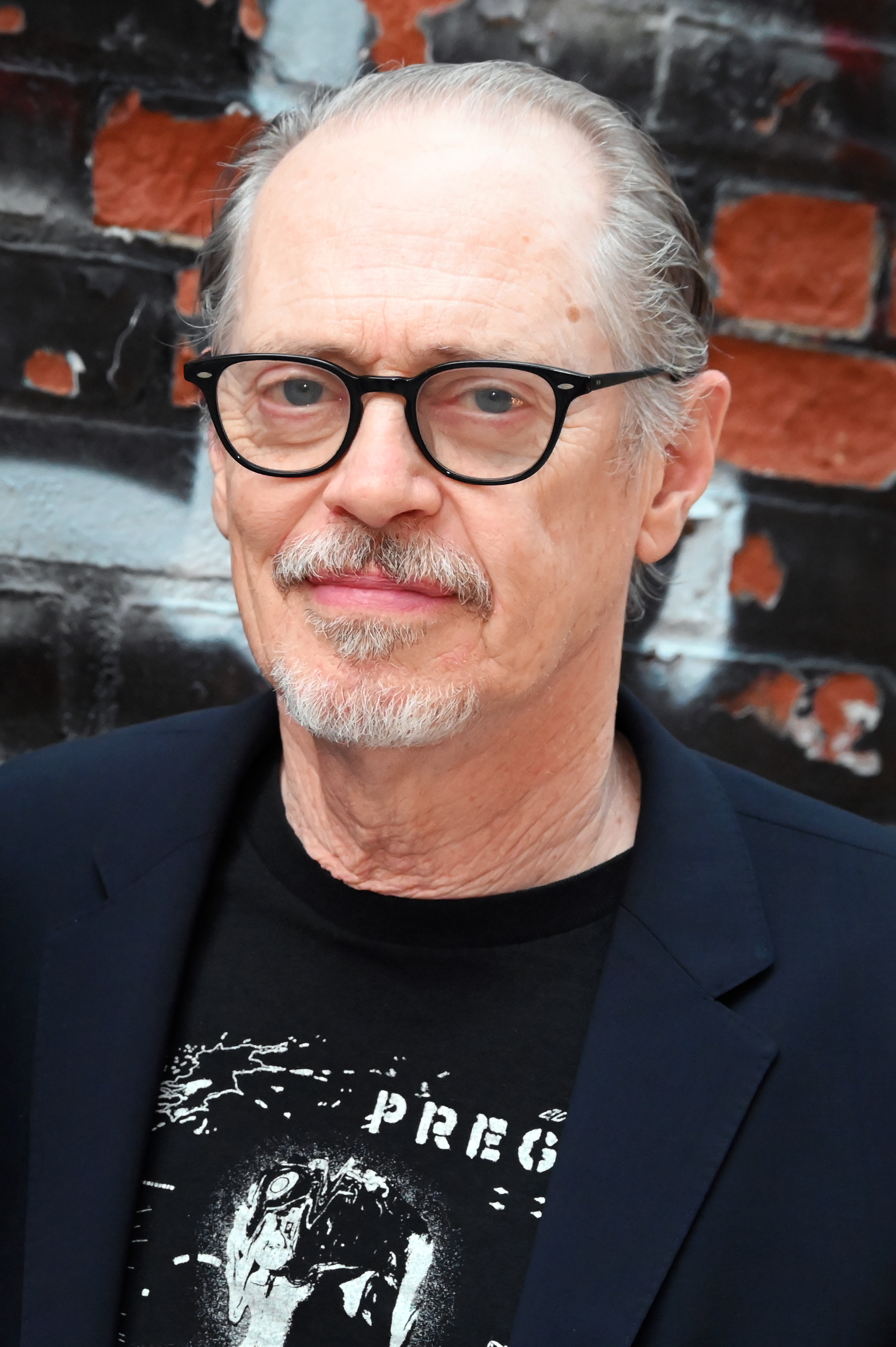
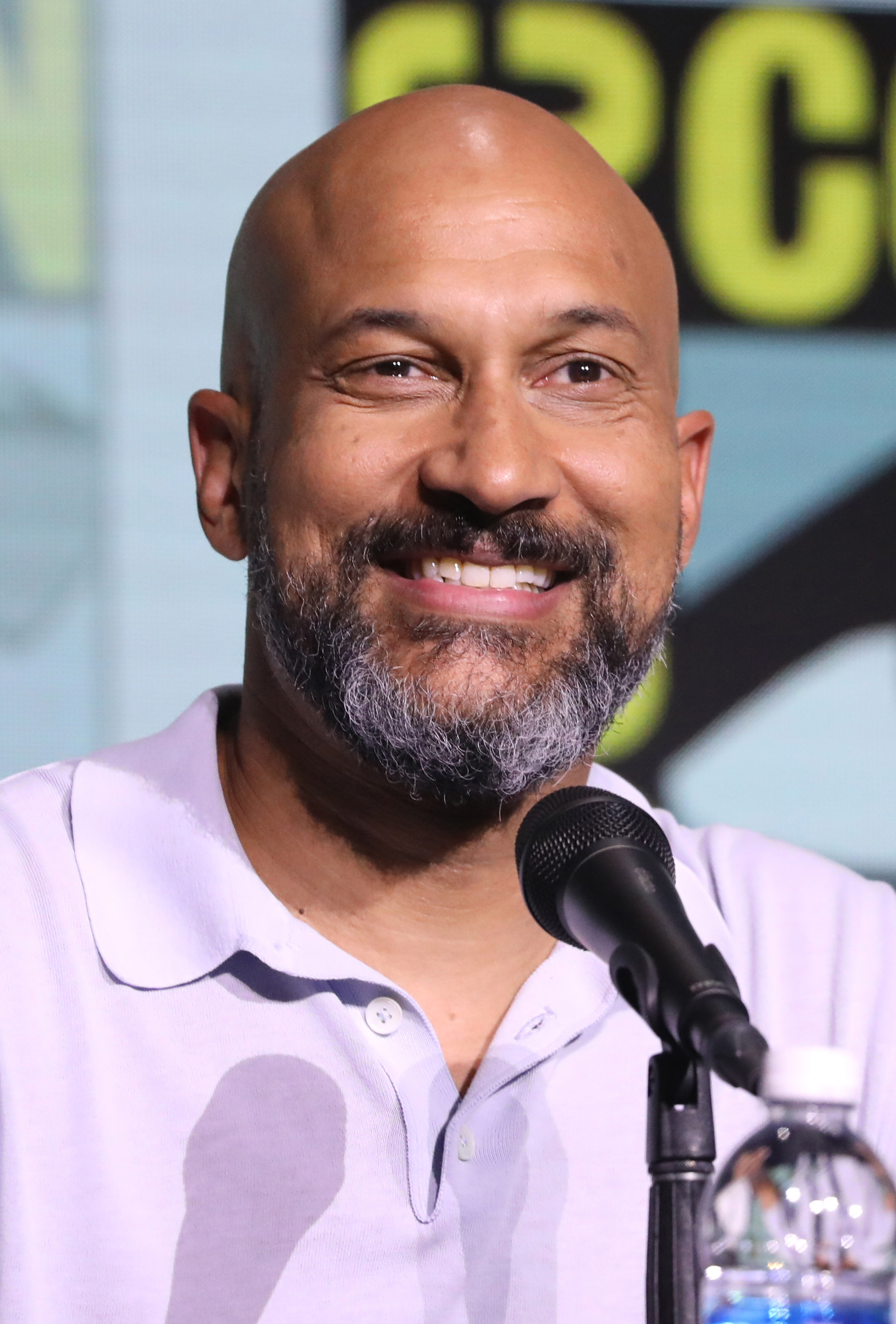
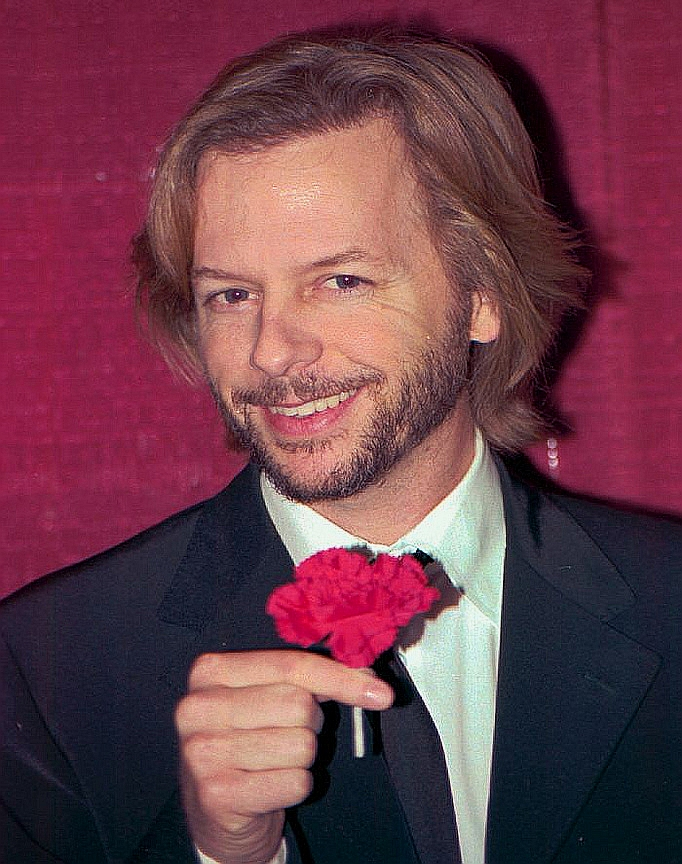
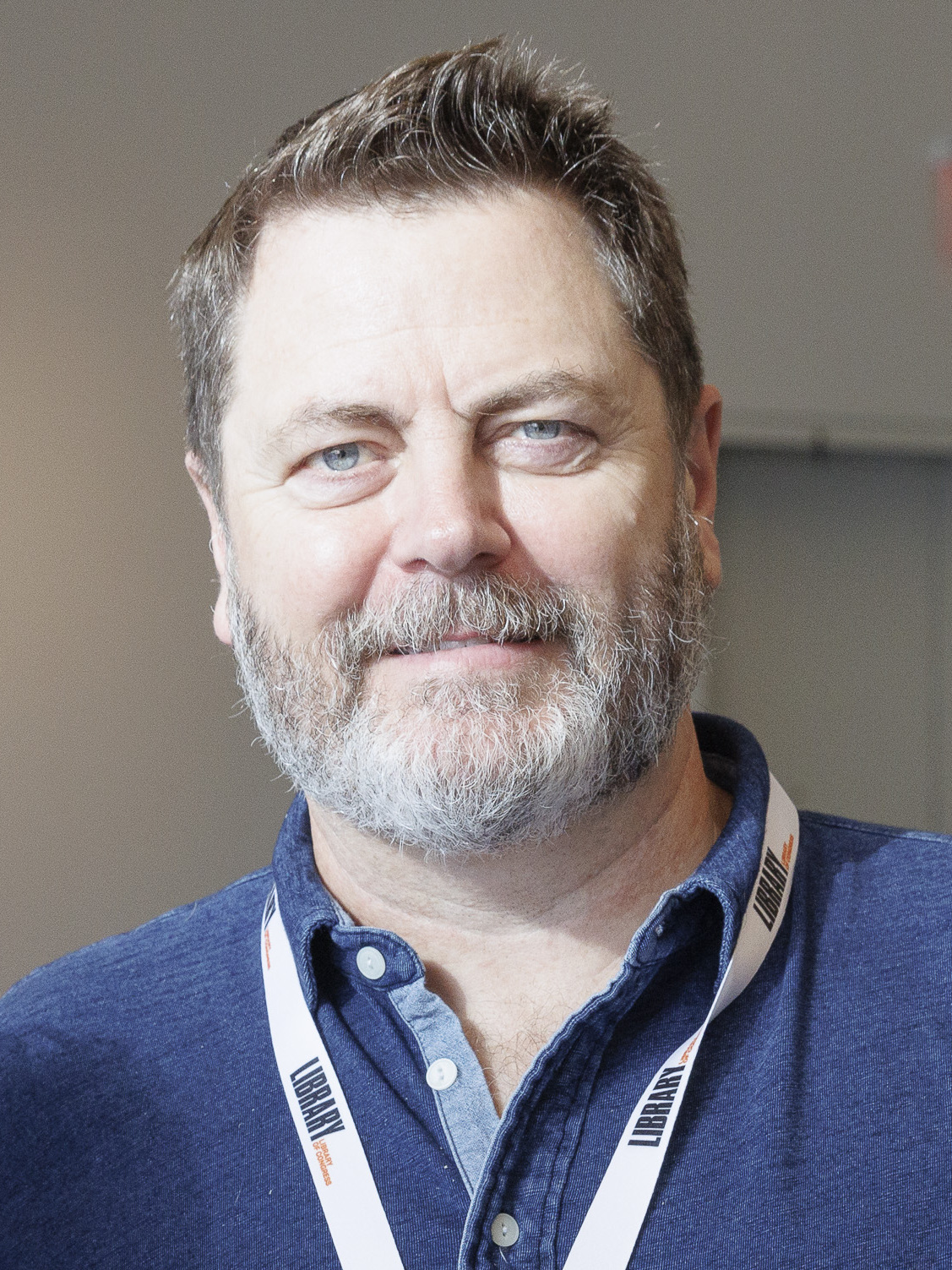
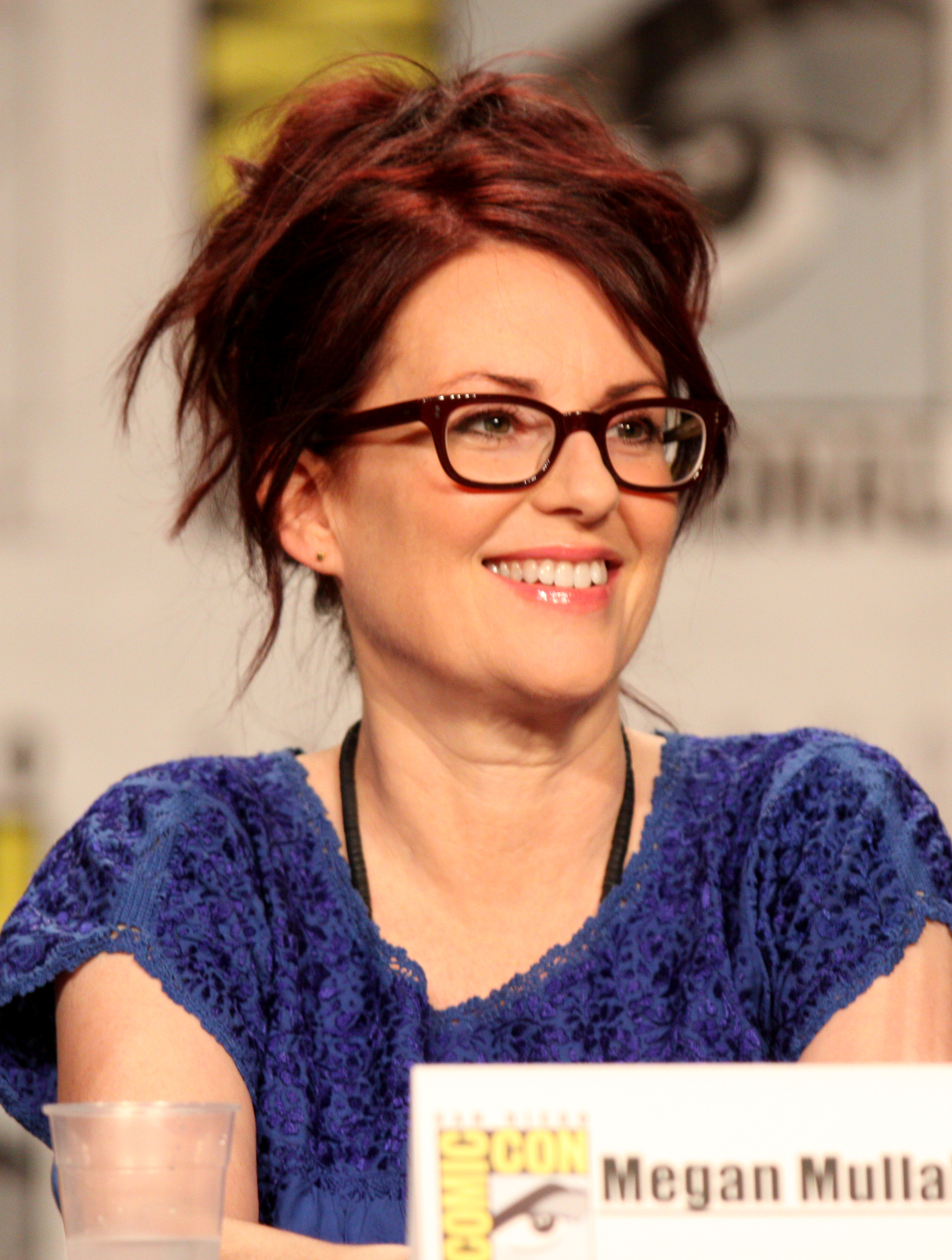
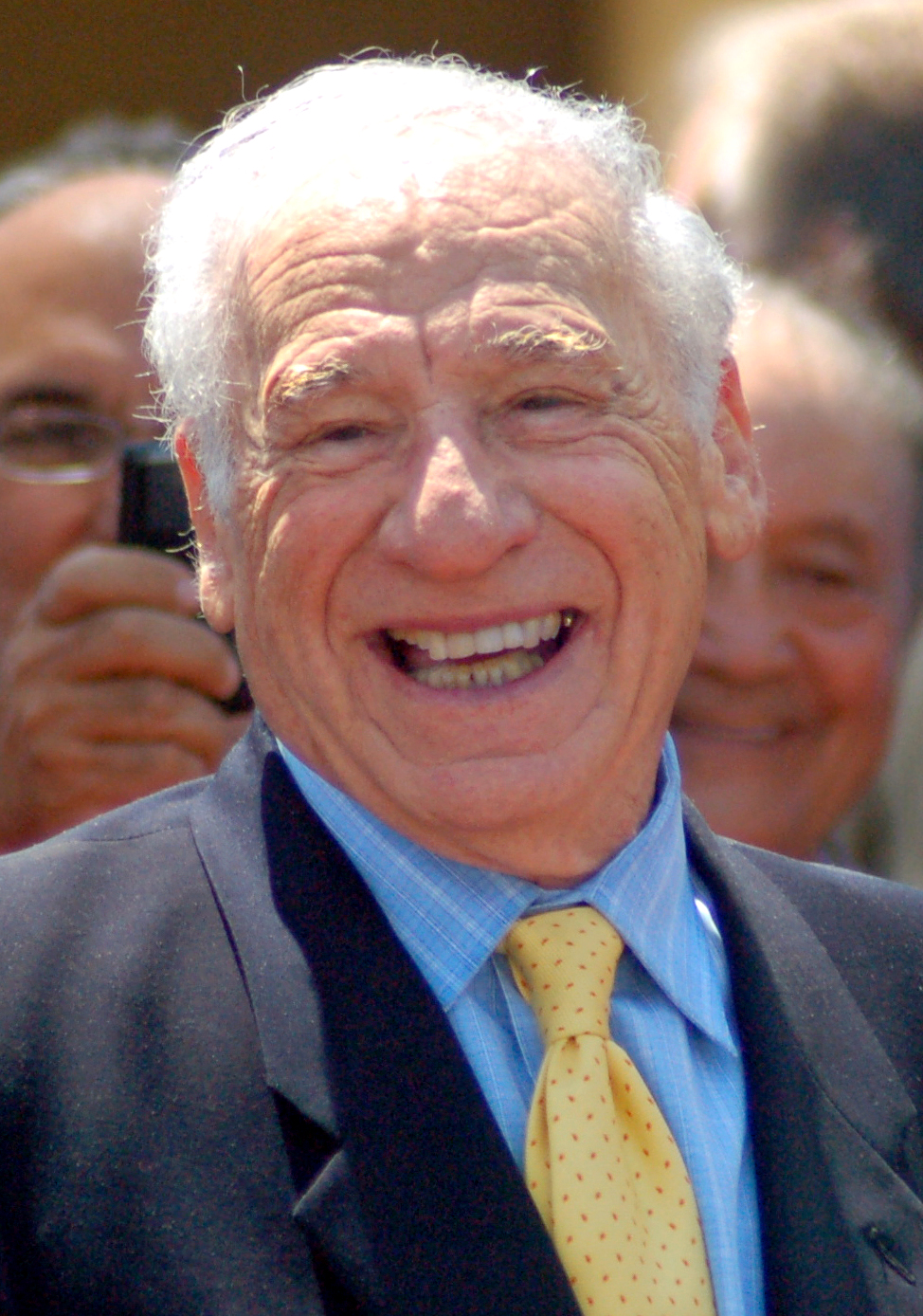
Top: Adam Sandler (Dracula), Andy Samberg (Johnny Loughran) and Selena Gomez (Mavis)

Middle: Kevin James (Frankenstein), Steve Buscemi (Wayne) and Keegan-Michael Key (Murray)

Bottom: David Spade (Griffin), Nick Offerman (Mike Loughran), Megan Mullally (Linda Loughran) and Mel Brooks (Vlad)
- Adam Sandler as Count "Drac" Dracula, a vampire, Mavis's father, Johnny's father-in-law, and Dennis's maternal grandfather who owns the hotel.
- Asher Blinkoff as Dennis Dracula-Loughran, Mavis and Johnny's dhampir son, and Dracula's grandson.
  - Sunny Sandler as baby Dennis
- Selena Gomez as Mavis Dracula-Loughran, Johnny's vampire wife, Dennis's mother, and daughter of Count Dracula and his late wife Martha.
- Andy Samberg as Jonathan "Johnny" Loughran, Mavis's human husband, Dennis's father, and son-in-law of Dracula.
- Mel Brooks as Vlad, an ancient vampire, Dracula's father, Mavis's paternal grandfather, and Dennis's great-grandfather.
- Kevin James as Frankenstein, one of Dracula's best friends who acts as an uncle to Mavis and mostly hangs out with Murray.
- Steve Buscemi as Wayne, a werewolf who is one of Dracula's best friends and Wanda's husband.
- Keegan-Michael Key as Murray, a short, fat mummy who is one of Dracula's best friends and mostly hangs out with Frankenstein. He was previously voiced by CeeLo Green in the first film.
- David Spade as Griffin the Invisible Man, one of Dracula's best friends.
- Sadie Sandler as Winnie, Wayne and Wanda's werewolf daughter and Dennis's best friend/love interest.
- Megan Mullally as Linda Loughran, Johnny's mother, Mavis's mother-in-law, and Dennis' paternal grandmother.
- Nick Offerman as Michael "Mike" Loughran, Johnny's father, Mavis's father-in-law, and Dennis' paternal grandfather.
- Rob Riggle as Bela, Vlad's vampire bat monster servant. Riggle was previously the voice of the Skeleton Husband from the first film.
- Dana Carvey as Dana, the vampire camp director at Camp Winnepacaca.
- Molly Shannon as Wanda, a werewolf, Wayne's heavily pregnant wife and Eunice's best friend.
- Fran Drescher as Eunice, Frankenstein's wife and Wanda's best friend.
- Chris Kattan as Kakie, a cake monster from Dennis' favorite television series. He is a parody of Cookie Monster from Sesame Street.
- Jon Lovitz as Erik, the Phantom of the Opera and the hotel's residential musician. Lovitz was previously the voice of Quasimodo in the first film (who does not reappear in the sequel films).
- Luenell as a shrunken head.
- Paul Brittain as Pandragora, an easygoing monster with tentacled hair that lives in Santa Cruz.
- Nick Swardson as Kelsey, a bearded man who is Mike and Linda's neighbor.
- Chris Parnell as Fly, Hotel Transylvania's fitness instructor.
- Doug Dale as Kal, a Mini-Mart worker in Santa Cruz.
- Jared Sandler as a tourist driver.

== Production ==
=== Development ===
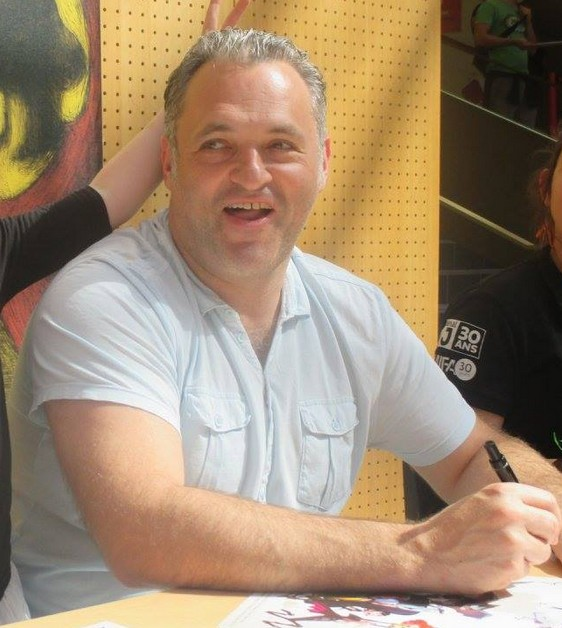
Director Genndy Tartakovsky at the 2015 Annecy International Animated Film Festival

Director Genndy Tartakovsky commented about the possibility of the sequel in October 2012, "Everyone is talking about it, but we haven't started writing it. There are a lot of fun ideas we could totally play with. It's a ripe world." The next month it was announced that a sequel had been greenlit, and was scheduled for release on September 25, 2015. On March 12, 2014, it was announced that Tartakovsky would return to direct the sequel, even though he was originally too busy developing his adaptation of Popeye, which would later get shelved.

CeeLo Green did not reprise the role of Murray the Mummy for the sequel after he was charged for giving a woman ecstasy in July 2012 which led to Sony Pictures Animation parting ways with Green and replacing him with Keegan-Michael Key.

It was suggested by director Genndy Tartakovsky that Adam Sandler had more creative control over this film than its predecessor, and that at times he was difficult to work with.

== Soundtrack ==
In March 2015, it was announced that Mark Mothersbaugh, who scored the first film, had signed on to score the sequel.

American girl group Fifth Harmony recorded a song for the film entitled "I'm in Love with a Monster". It was featured in the film's official trailer and was also played when the film itself was released.

== Release ==
=== Theatrical ===
Columbia Pictures released the film in the United States on September 25, 2015, and in the United Kingdom on October 16, 2015.

=== Home media ===
Hotel Transylvania 2 was released on DVD and Blu-ray (2D and 3D) on January 12, 2016, by Sony Pictures Home Entertainment. The film was also released in Digital HD on December 22, 2015.

In April 2021, Sony signed a deal giving Disney access to their legacy content, including past Hotel Transylvania films to stream on Disney+ and Hulu and appear on Disney's linear television networks. Disney's access to Sony's titles would come following their availability on Netflix.

== Reception ==
=== Box office ===
Hotel Transylvania 2 has grossed $169.7 million in North America and $305.5 million elsewhere, for a worldwide total of $475.2 million, against a budget of $80 million. Deadline Hollywood calculated the net profit of the film to be $159.48 million, when factoring together all expenses and revenues for the film. It was Sony Pictures Animation's highest-grossing film worldwide until its sequel, Hotel Transylvania 3: Summer Vacation, surpassed it in September 2018, with Spider-Man: Into the Spider-Verse also surpassing the film's domestic gross in January 2019.

Predictions for the opening of Hotel Transylvania 2 in North America were continuously revised upwards, starting from $35—$48 million. Hotel Transylvania 2 earned $13.3 million from 3,754 theaters on its opening day in North America, which was the second-biggest Friday opening day in September, behind Insidious: Chapter 2 ($20.3 million). During its opening weekend, Hotel Transylvania 2 earned $48.5 million from 3,754 theaters, which at the time set new records such as the highest opening for a Sony Pictures Animation film, the biggest opening in Adam Sandler's career, beating 2005's The Longest Yard ($47.6 million), and previously held the biggest opening in the month of September (record overtaken by It in 2017). Regarding the film's successful opening, Josh Greenstein, Sony's president of marketing said, "We had a great date, and this is a big win for Sony Pictures Animation." The largest demographic of the opening weekend audience was under the age of 25 (60%) and female (59%), followed by male (41%), 25 and over (40%) and kids (38%). According to Rentrak's PostTrak reports, 23% of the audience bought tickets because it was an animated film, while 16% were attracted to the toon's subject matter and plot.

Hotel Transylvania 2 was released in a total of 90 countries. It was released in 42 markets between September 25 and 27, 2015, the same weekend as its North American release, and earned $30.18 million from 6,500 screens that weekend. Its overall rank for the weekend was second, behind Everest. Its opening weekends in the U.K., Ireland and Malta ($9.5 million including previews), Mexico ($7.84 million), South Korea ($4.2 million), Russia and the CIS ($6 million), Germany ($3.9 million), Italy ($3.7 million) and France and Spain ($3.2 million respectively) in October represented its largest takings. In China, it opened with an estimated $12.1 million debuting at second place behind the Chinese local film The Witness which grossed $18.5 million. While the China figures are low in comparison to recent Hollywood movie openings, it actually excelled the first film's local lifetime gross by 19% in just the first six days. In terms of total earnings, its largest market outside of North America is the U.K. ($29.4 million) followed by Mexico ($23.7 million) and Venezuela ($19.9 million).

=== Critical reception ===
Hotel Transylvania 2 has an approval rating of 57% based on 109 professional reviews on the review aggregator website Rotten Tomatoes, with an average rating of 5.3/10. Its critical consensus reads, "Hotel Transylvania 2 is marginally better than the original, which may or may not be enough of a recommendation to watch 89 minutes of corny, colorfully animated gags from Adam Sandler and company." Metacritic (which uses a weighted average) assigned Hotel Transylvania 2 a score of 44 out of 100 based on 24 critics, indicating "mixed or average" reviews. Audiences polled by CinemaScore gave the film an average grade of "A−" on an A+ to F scale.

Max Nicholson of IGN awarded it a score of 6.5 out of 10, saying "While Genndy Tartakovsky's animation is top-notch, Hotel Transylvania 2 doesn't live up to the first monster mash." Nick Schager of Variety gave the film a negative review, saying "Its plot comes across as just a rickety skeleton designed to prop up Sandler and company's litany of cornball punchlines and gags, only a few of which cleverly play-off of these characters' iconography" Alonso Duralde of The Wrap gave the film a positive review, saying "Whereas the jokes in the Grown Ups series feel reactionary and bullying, the family-friendly Hotel Transylvania gags instead come off as clever and humane, even when they're making fun of helicopter moms and lawsuit-sensitive summer camps." Stephen Whitty of the Newark Star-Ledger gave the film one and a half stars out of four, saying "Great movies like ParaNorman and Frankenweenie showed the laughs you could get out of funny fiends; Hotel Transylvania 2 just digs up a few corny gags." Bruce Demara of the Toronto Star gave the film two and a half stars out of four, saying "While the first Hotel Trans had humour for both younger and older audiences, this one will likely fall short in its appeal to adults, although there's plenty for the little monsters to enjoy."

Peter Hartlaub of the San Francisco Chronicle gave the film one out of four stars, saying "Hotel Transylvania 2 is an unfortunate throwback to about 20 years ago, when animated movies were more widely accepted as cinematic babysitters." Sandie Angulo Chen of The Washington Post gave the film two out of four stars, saying "Tartakovsky hasn't created the sort of sequel that eclipses the original, but then again the original wasn't exactly Toy Story or How to Train Your Dragon." Jesse Hassenger of The A.V. Club gave the film a C+, saying "It's an episodic, energetically animated gag factory from the pen of Adam Sandler, and while it's the best screenplay to bear his name in years, it also warps some overfamiliar family-movie concerns until they become unavoidable in their ickiness." Michael Rechtshaffen of The Hollywood Reporter gave the film a positive review, saying "This time around, greater attention has been paid to story and character development (while scaling back on all the sight gags) and the substantial results give the ample voice cast and returning director Genndy Tartakovsky more to sink their teeth into, with pleasing results." Josh Kupecki of The Austin Chronicle gave the film one out of five stars, saying "Channeling your inner child, you may find solace in Hotel Transylvania 2, but in the end it has no bite, doing continued disservice to the Universal monsters it scabs out, and adding another soiled feather to Sandler's cap of mediocrity."

=== Accolades ===
List of awards and nominations
Award	Date of ceremony	Category	Recipient(s)	Result	Ref.
Annie Awards	February 6, 2016	Outstanding Animated Effects in an Animated Production	Chris Logan, Brian Casper, Gavin Baxter and William Eckroat	Nominated	
Annie Awards	February 6, 2016	Outstanding Character Design in an Animated Production	Craig Kellman and Stephen DeStefano	Nominated	
Annie Awards	February 6, 2016	Outstanding Storyboarding in an Animated Production	Mike Smukavic	Nominated	
British Academy Children's Awards	November 20, 2016	BAFTA Kids' Vote	Hotel Transylvania 2	Nominated	
Kids' Choice Awards	March 12, 2016	Favorite Voice From an Animated Movie	Selena Gomez	Nominated	
Kids' Choice Awards	March 12, 2016	Favorite Animated Movie	Hotel Transylvania 2	Won	
People's Choice Awards	January 6, 2016	Favorite Animated Movie Voice	Adam Sandler	Nominated	
People's Choice Awards	January 6, 2016	Favorite Animated Movie Voice	Selena Gomez	Won	
People's Choice Awards	January 6, 2016	Favorite Family Film	Hotel Transylvania 2	Nominated	
Teen Choice Awards	July 31, 2016	Choice Music: Song from a Movie or TV Show	"I'm in Love with a Monster" by Fifth Harmony	Won	
Visual Effects Society Awards	February 2, 2016	Outstanding Visual Effects in an Animated Feature	Alan Hawkins, Karl Herbst, Skye Lyons, Genndy Tartakovsky	Nominated	

== Sequel ==
Michelle Murdocca, the film's producer, said before the film's release that the studio was "talking about number 3 and moving forward and taking the franchise to the next level." On November 2, 2015, it was announced Hotel Transylvania 3 would be released on September 21, 2018. Despite previously leaving the series to direct other projects, Genndy Tartakovsky would return as director for this installment. According to Tartakovsky, he returned after he got an inspiration from a "miserable" family vacation. Adam Sandler, Selena Gomez, and Andy Samberg also reprised their previous roles as Drac, Mavis and Johnny in the film, which was written by Austin Powers writer Michael McCullers. The film took place aboard a cruise ship. On February 6, 2017, the release date was moved up to July 13, 2018. It has been released and Hotel Transylvania: Transformania has also been released. A fifth installment will follow.
