= Hotel Transylvania =

American animated media franchise

- Created by: Todd Durham
- Owner: Sony Pictures Animation
- Years: 2012–present

Print publications
- Graphic novels: Kakieland Katastrophe (2017); My Little Monster-Sitter (2018); Motel Transylvania (2018)

Films and television
- Films: Hotel Transylvania (2012); Hotel Transylvania 2 (2015); Hotel Transylvania 3: Summer Vacation (2018); Hotel Transylvania: Transformania (2022); The Haunting of Hotel Transylvania (2027)
- Short films: Goodnight Mr. Foot (2012); Puppy! (2017); Monster Pets (2021)
- Animated series: Hotel Transylvania: The Series (2017–2020); Motel Transylvania (2027)

Games
- Video games: List of video games

Audio
- Soundtracks: Hotel Transylvania (2012); Hotel Transylvania 2 (2015); Hotel Transylvania 3: Summer Vacation (2018); Hotel Transylvania: Transformania (2022)

Miscellaneous
- Theme park attractions: List of attractions

Hotel Transylvania is an American media franchise created by Todd Durham and owned by Sony Pictures Animation. It consists of four animated feature films, three short films, an animated television series, and several video games. The series focuses on the adventures surrounding monsters who reside in the titular plaza hotel where they can relax and get away from humans due to fear of persecution.

The first film, Hotel Transylvania, was released in September 2012, with two sequels, Hotel Transylvania 2 and Hotel Transylvania 3: Summer Vacation, released in September 2015 and July 2018, respectively. The films have received mixed reviews from critics and grossed over $1.3 billion worldwide against a combined production budget of $245 million. A fourth feature film titled Hotel Transylvania: Transformania was released on Amazon Prime Video on January 14, 2022, which also received mixed reviews from critics. A fifth film, The Haunting of Hotel Transylvania, is scheduled for release on October 8, 2027.

== Origin ==
Comedy writer Todd Durham came up with the concept of Hotel Transylvania. Which he based on his book of the same name; after creating the bible for a franchise of several films, television series, video games, books, merchandising, hotel chain, and theme park, took the package unsolicited to Columbia Pictures and set it up at Sony Pictures Animation.

== Films ==
Film	U.S. release date	Director(s)	Screenwriter(s)	Story by	Producer(s)
Hotel Transylvania	September 28, 2012	Genndy Tartakovsky	Peter Baynham and Robert Smigel	Todd Durham and Kevin Hageman & Dan Hageman	Michelle Murdocca
Hotel Transylvania 2	September 25, 2015	Genndy Tartakovsky	Robert Smigel & Adam Sandler	Robert Smigel & Adam Sandler	Michelle Murdocca
Hotel Transylvania 3: Summer Vacation	July 13, 2018	Genndy Tartakovsky	Genndy Tartakovsky & Michael McCullers	Genndy Tartakovsky & Michael McCullers	Michelle Murdocca
Hotel Transylvania: Transformania	January 14, 2022	Derek Drymon & Jennifer Kluska	Amos Vernon & Nunzio Randazzo and Genndy Tartakovsky	Genndy Tartakovsky	Alice Dewey Goldstone
The Haunting of Hotel Transylvania	October 8, 2027	Jennifer Kluska & Alan Hawkins	TBA	TBA	Lawrence Jonas

=== Hotel Transylvania (2012) ===
Hotel Transylvania is the first film of the franchise and it was released in theatres on September 28, 2012. It is about a human named Johnny (Andy Samberg), who accidentally stumbles upon the hotel and instantly falls in love with Dracula's teenage daughter, Mavis (Selena Gomez), and eventually dates her, despite Dracula (Adam Sandler) attempting to keep Johnny away from his daughter.

=== Hotel Transylvania 2 (2015) ===
Hotel Transylvania 2 is the second film of the franchise and it was released in theatres on September 25, 2015. It is about Mavis and Johnny, who have a half-human/half-vampire son named Dennis. Mavis thinks Hotel Transylvania isn't the right place to raise Dennis and wants to raise him in California. When Dracula is disappointed that Dennis does not have any vampire abilities, he helps his friends make his grandson a vampire. Things get complicated when Dracula's father Vlad (Mel Brooks) shows up.

=== Hotel Transylvania 3: Summer Vacation (2018) ===
Hotel Transylvania 3: Summer Vacation is the third film of the franchise and it was released in theatres on July 13, 2018. It is about Dracula falling for Ericka (Kathryn Hahn), a great-granddaughter of monster hunter Van Helsing (Jim Gaffigan) while on a cruise ship with his family.

=== Hotel Transylvania: Transformania (2022) ===
Hotel Transylvania: Transformania is the fourth film of the franchise. It was released on streaming through Amazon Prime Video on January 14, 2022. It is about Dracula, now voiced by Brian Hull and turned into a human, teaming up with Johnny, turned into a monster, to find a cure to turn themselves back into their old selves before their transformations become permanent.

=== The Haunting of Hotel Transylvania (2027) ===
While Transformania was billed as the final film in the franchise at the time of its release, in September 2024, Genndy Tartakovsky was asked in an interview with Collider about the possibility of a fifth Hotel Transylvania film. While attending the SCAD AnimationFest, where he was being honored with an Award of Excellence, Tartakovsky stated that Sony might consider continuing the series if there is sufficient audience demand. He acknowledged the strong performance of Transformania during its release on Amazon and indicated that further developments would depend on future interest. In January 2026, during an interview with Keegan-Michael Key at the 83rd Golden Globe Awards, he confirmed that he was about to start work on a fifth film.

In July 2026, a fifth film was confirmed to be in development with Jennifer Kluska and Alan Hawkins attached as directors. The film will be released on October 8, 2027, with Sony handling North America and certain international markets and Amazon MGM Studios distributing it in territories where it will establish direct distribution operations, notably the U.K., France, Germany, Spain, Italy, Mexico, Brazil, Australia, and New Zealand; Sony will handle theatrical distribution in the other overseas territories.

== Television series ==
=== Hotel Transylvania: The Series (2017–2020) ===
A television series based on the film premiered on June 25, 2017, and ended on October 29, 2020. Developed and produced by Nelvana Limited, in partnership with Sony Pictures Animation, the prequel series focused on the 114/115 years of Mavis and her friends at the Hotel Transylvania. Sony Pictures Television handled distribution in the United States, while Nelvana distributed the series outside the United States. It aired on the Disney Channel worldwide.

=== Motel Transylvania (2027) ===
In June 2024, Motel Transylvania, a television series set to debut on Netflix in 2025, was announced. The series is set to focus on Dracula and Mavis opening a motel for both humans and monsters somewhere in the California desert. In August 2025, it was revealed that Genndy Tartakovsky is involved with the series. On October 30, 2025, it was revealed that the release date of the series would be pushed back to sometime in 2027.

== Short films ==
=== Goodnight Mr. Foot (2012) ===
Goodnight Mr. Foot is a traditionally animated short film based on Hotel Transylvania, featuring Bigfoot from the film. Premiering in time for Halloween, on October 26, 2012, the short was shown exclusively in Regal Entertainment Group Cinemas, before the theatrical shows of Hotel Transylvania. As Sony Pictures Animation's first traditionally animated film, it was written and directed by Genndy Tartakovsky himself, who also animated the short with the help of Rough Draft Studios in South Korea, whom previously worked on Tartakovsky's animated series on Cartoon Network. Animated in the style of Bob Clampett, Tex Avery, and Chuck Jones, Tartakovsky created the short in four weeks during the final production stages of the main film. Bigfoot (who had a non-speaking role in Hotel Transylvania) was voiced by Corey Burton while the Witch Maid was voiced by Rose Abdoo. Both voice actors provided additional voices in Hotel Transylvania.

Taking place before the events of Hotel Transylvania, the short stars Bigfoot, whose rest in Hotel Transylvania is disturbed by an overly enthusiastic witch maid.

=== Puppy! (2017) ===
Puppy! is a CG-animated fantasy comedy short film based on Hotel Transylvania, featuring Dennis (voiced by Asher Blinkoff) from Hotel Transylvania 2, with the additional voices of Selena Gomez, reprising her role as Mavis, Andy Samberg as Johnny, and Adam Sandler as Dracula. The film was written and directed by Genndy Tartakovsky, and was shown in theaters alongside The Emoji Movie, which was released in the United States on July 28, 2017. The film is set in the hotel, as Dennis convinces Dracula to give him a monster-sized puppy named Tinkles, and the hotel learns to cope with it. The short is a sneak preview of the third film, Hotel Transylvania 3: Summer Vacation, which was released on July 13, 2018; Dracula's final line in the short, "I need a vacation...", further reinforces this.

=== Monster Pets (2021) ===
Monster Pets is a Hotel Transylvania short film featuring Dracula trying to find a pet companion for his lively puppy, Tinkles. The short was played exclusively at Cinemark Theatres on the weekend following April 1, 2021, before select PG-rated films, and was released online on April 9, 2021. It was directed by Jennifer Kluska and Derek Drymon, written by Kluska, and produced by Christian Roedel. The short marked the first time that Adam Sandler did not return to voice Dracula and was replaced by voice actor Brian Hull. Hull would reprise the role in the film Hotel Transylvania: Transformania.

== Reception ==
=== Box office performance ===
Film	Release date	Box Office Gross			All Time Ranking		Budget (millions)	References
Film	Release date	Domestic	Foreign	Worldwide	Domestic	Worldwide	Budget (millions)	References
Hotel Transylvania	September 28, 2012	$148,313,048	$210,062,555	$358,375,603	359	339	$85	
Hotel Transylvania 2	September 25, 2015	$169,700,110	$305,099,890	$474,800,000	282	215	$80	
Hotel Transylvania 3: Summer Vacation	July 13, 2018	$167,510,016	$361,073,758	$528,583,774	290	187	$65–80	
Hotel Transylvania: Transformania	January 14, 2022	—N/a	$18,480,000	$18,480,000	—N/a	5,626	$75	
Total		$485,523,174	$894,716,203	$1,380,239,377	23	16	$320	

=== Critical and public response ===
Film	Rotten Tomatoes	Metacritic	CinemaScore
Hotel Transylvania	45% (143 reviews)	47 (32 reviews)	A−
Hotel Transylvania 2	56% (110 reviews)	44 (24 reviews)	A−
Hotel Transylvania 3: Summer Vacation	62% (119 reviews)	54 (23 reviews)	A−
Hotel Transylvania: Transformania	47% (78 reviews)	46 (15 reviews)	—N/a

== Cast and characters ==
List indicators
- A dark gray cell indicates the character did not appear in that installment.
- A ^{Y} indicates an actor or actress voiced a younger version of their character.

Characters	Films					Short films			Television series			Video games	
Characters	Hotel Transylvania	Hotel Transylvania 2	Hotel Transylvania 3: Summer Vacation	Hotel Transylvania: Transformania	The Haunting of Hotel Transylvania	Goodnight Mr. Foot	Puppy!	Monster Pets	Hotel Transylvania: The Series		Motel Transylvania	Hotel Transylvania 3: Monsters Overboard	Hotel Transylvania: Scary-Tale Adventures
Characters	Hotel Transylvania	Hotel Transylvania 2	Hotel Transylvania 3: Summer Vacation	Hotel Transylvania: Transformania	The Haunting of Hotel Transylvania	Goodnight Mr. Foot	Puppy!	Monster Pets	Season 1	Season 2	Motel Transylvania	Hotel Transylvania 3: Monsters Overboard	Hotel Transylvania: Scary-Tale Adventures
Count Dracula	Adam Sandler	Adam Sandler	Adam Sandler	Brian Hull	TBA	Silent role	Adam Sandler	Brian Hull	David Berni	Ivan Sherry	TBA	Brock Powell	Brian Hull
Jonathan "Johnny" Loughran	Andy Samberg	Andy Samberg	Andy Samberg	Andy Samberg	Andy Samberg		Andy Samberg					Brian T. Stevenson	Danny Gendron
Mavis Dracula-Loughran	Selena Gomez	Selena Gomez	Selena Gomez	Selena Gomez	Selena Gomez		Selena Gomez		Bryn McAuley	Bryn McAuley	TBA	Mellissa Sturm	Mellissa Sturm
Mavis Dracula-Loughran	Sadie Sandler^{Y}	Selena Gomez	Selena Gomez	Victoria Gomez^{Y}	Selena Gomez		Selena Gomez		Bryn McAuley	Bryn McAuley	TBA	Mellissa Sturm	Mellissa Sturm
Frank	Kevin James	Kevin James	Kevin James	Brad Abrell	TBA				Paul Braunstein	Paul Braunstein		Danny Gendron	Brad Abrell
Wayne	Steve Buscemi	Steve Buscemi	Steve Buscemi	Steve Buscemi	Steve Buscemi							Michael Buescemi	Michael Buescemi
Murray	CeeLo Green	Keegan-Michael Key	Keegan-Michael Key	Keegan-Michael Key	Keegan-Michael Key							Keegan-Michael Key	Kyle Chapple
Griffin	David Spade	David Spade	David Spade	David Spade	David Spade								Daniel Bonjour
Eunice	Fran Drescher	Fran Drescher	Fran Drescher	Fran Drescher	Fran Drescher				N/A	Josette Halpert			
Wanda	Molly Shannon	Molly Shannon	Molly Shannon	Molly Shannon	Molly Shannon				Diane Salema				
Winnie	Sadie Sandler	Sadie Sandler	Sadie Sandler	Zoe Berri	TBA				N/A			Silent role	Zoe Berri
Blobby	Silent role	Jonny Solomon	Genndy Tartakovsky	Genndy Tartakovsky	TBA	Silent cameo		Silent cameo					Silent role
Bigfoot	Silent role	Silent role	Silent role	Silent role	TBA	Corey Burton	Silent cameo		Silent role	Silent role			
Fly	Chris Parnell	Chris Parnell	Silent role	Silent role	TBA								
Quasimodo Wilson	Jon Lovitz								Scott McCord	Scott McCord			
Martha	Jackie Sandler	Painting	Mentioned										
Dennis		Asher Blinkoff	Asher Blinkoff	Asher Blinkoff	TBA		Asher Blinkoff					Silent role	Asher Blinkoff
Dennis		Sunny Sandler^{Y}	Asher Blinkoff	Asher Blinkoff	TBA		Asher Blinkoff					Silent role	Asher Blinkoff
Mike Loughran		Nick Offerman											
Linda Loughran		Megan Mullally											
Vlad		Mel Brooks	Mel Brooks										
Dana		Dana Carvey											
Bela		Rob Riggle											
Brandon Kakie		Chris Kattan											
Kelsey		Nick Swardson	Michelle Murdocca	Silent role									
Crystal		Silent role	Chrissy Teigen										
Ericka Dracula (née Van Helsing)			Kathryn Hahn	Kathryn Hahn	TBA							Julianne Buescher	
Professor Abraham Van Helsing			Jim Gaffigan	Jim Gaffigan	TBA								
Stan			Chris Parnell										
Kraken			Joe Jonas										
Tinkles			Joe Whyte	Silent role	TBA		Joe Whyte	Derek Drymon					
Puppy Blobby			Genndy Tartakovsky	Silent cameo				Genndy Tartakovsky					
Gremlin Pilot			Aaron LaPlante	Aaron LaPlante									
Gremlin Stewardess			Aaron LaPlante	Aaron LaPlante									
Toots							Jennifer Kluska						
Aunt Lydia									Dan Chameroy	Dan Chameroy			
Wendy Blob									Evany Rosen	Evany Rosen			
Hank N. Stein									Gage Munroe	Gage Munroe			
Pedro									Joseph Motiki	Joseph Motiki			
Uncle Gene									Patrick McKenna	Patrick McKenna			
Klaus									Carter Hayden	Carter Hayden			

- A grey cell indicates character did not appear in that medium.

== Crew ==
Role	Films					Television series	
Role	Hotel Transylvania	Hotel Transylvania 2	Hotel Transylvania 3: Summer Vacation	Hotel Transylvania: Transformania	The Haunting of Hotel Transylvania	Hotel Transylvania: The Series	Motel Transylvania
Director(s)	Genndy Tartakovsky	Genndy Tartakovsky	Genndy Tartakovsky	Derek Drymon; Jennifer Kluska	Jennifer Kluska; Alan Hawkins	Robin Budd	TBA
Producer	Michelle Murdocca	Michelle Murdocca	Michelle Murdocca	Alice Dewey Goldstone	Lawrence Jonas	Jane Crawford	TBA
Co-producer(s)	Lydia Bottegoni	Skye Lyons	Carey A. Smith	Ryan Gilleland	TBA	—N/a	TBA
Executive producer(s)	Adam Sandler; Robert Smigel; Allen Covert	Adam Sandler; Robert Smigel; Allen Covert; Ben Waisbren	—N/a	Genndy Tartakovsky; Michelle Murdocca; Selena Gomez	Genndy Tartakovsky; Michelle Murdocca; Selena Gomez; Andy Samberg	Rick Mischel; Scott Dyer; Irene Weibel	TBA
Writer(s)	Screenplay by: Peter Baynham; Robert Smigel Story by: Todd Durham; Dan Hageman; Kevin Hageman	Robert Smigel; Adam Sandler	Genndy Tartakovsky; Michael McCullers	Screenplay by: Amos Vernon; Nunzio Randazzo; Genndy Tartakovsky Story by: Genndy Tartakovsky	TBA	Various	TBA
Composer(s)	Mark Mothersbaugh	Mark Mothersbaugh	Mark Mothersbaugh	Mark Mothersbaugh	TBA	Stephen Skratt; Asher Lenz	TBA
Editor(s)	Catherine Apple	Catherine Apple	Joyce Arrastia	Lynn Hobson	TBA	—N/a	TBA
Production Companies	Sony Pictures Animation	Sony Pictures Animation; LStar Capital; MRC	Sony Pictures Animation; MRC	Sony Pictures Animation; MRC	Sony Pictures Animation; MRC	Sony Pictures Animation; Nelvana; Corus Entertainment	Sony Pictures Animation
Distributor	Columbia Pictures; Sony Pictures Releasing	Columbia Pictures; Sony Pictures Releasing	Columbia Pictures; Sony Pictures Releasing	Amazon Studios	Columbia Pictures; Sony Pictures Releasing; Amazon MGM Studios	Sony Pictures Television	Netflix

== Video games ==
A social game based on the film, titled Hotel Transylvania Social Game and made by Sony Pictures Interactive, was released on August 15, 2012. The game allows players to create their own Hotel Transylvania, where they must take care of the hotel's guests.

Another video game, titled Hotel Transylvania, developed by WayForward Technologies and published by GameMill Entertainment, was released on September 18, 2012, for Nintendo DS and Nintendo 3DS at retail. The Nintendo 3DS version of the game was also released digitally in the Nintendo eShop in North America on November 15, 2012.

A mobile game, titled Hotel Transylvania Dash, developed by Sony Pictures Consumer Products Inc. and PlayFirst, was released to iTunes App Store on September 20, 2012. The game is a variation of Hotel Dash and features the film's art and characters.

A mobile storybook game, titled Hotel Transylvania BooClips Deluxe, developed by Castle Builders and Sony Pictures Animation, was released on the iTunes App Store, Nook Store, Google Play for Android, iBookstore, Microsoft's Metro, and for PC and Mac via BooClips, both in English and in Spanish, on September 20, 2012.

A third video game based on Hotel Transylvania 3: Summer Vacation, Hotel Transylvania 3 Monsters Overboard, published by Outright Games, was released on July 13, 2018.

A video game based on the franchise, Hotel Transylvania: Scary-Tale Adventures, developed by Drakhar Studio and published by Outright Games, was released for Microsoft Windows, PlayStation 4, PlayStation 5, Nintendo Switch, and Xbox One on March 11, 2022.

== Theme park attractions ==
In December 2016, a dark ride based on the franchise opened at Motiongate Dubai, in Dubai, United Arab Emirates. In April 2021, another ride based on the film series opened at Dream Island in Moscow, Russia. In October 2021, a new themed-land, based on the film franchise, opened at Columbia Pictures Aquaverse in Sattahip, Chonburi, Thailand.
