= Dora the Explorer =

American children's media franchise

- Franchise logo
- Created by: Chris Gifford; Valerie Walsh Valdes; Eric Weiner
- Original work: Dora the Explorer TV series
- Owners: Nickelodeon (Skydance)
- Years: 2000–present

Print publications
- Book: 500+ (multiple publishers)

Films and television
- Films: Dora and the Lost City of Gold (2019); Dora and the Search for Sol Dorado (2025)
- Short film: Dora and the Fantastical Creatures
- Television series: Untitled Dora the Explorer live-action TV series (upcoming)
- Animated series: Dora the Explorer (globalized versions); Go, Diego, Go!; Dora and Friends: Into the City!; Dora
- Direct-to-video: List of Dora the Explorer home media releases

Games
- Video game: Dora the Explorer video games

Audio
- Soundtrack: The Soundtrack

Miscellaneous
- Toys: 2000+ (multiple producers; including Mattel and Lego)

Dora the Explorer is an American media franchise centered on the title character from an animated children's television series that features interactive elements and frequently breaks the fourth wall. It was created by Chris Gifford, Valerie Walsh Valdes, and Eric Weiner, and produced by Nickelodeon Animation Studio. The series originally ran on Nickelodeon from August 14, 2000 to June 5, 2014, with the final six unaired episodes later airing from July 7, 2019 to August 9, 2019. It has since spawned a spin-off television series (Go, Diego, Go!), a sequel television series (Dora and Friends: Into the City!), a live-action feature film and, a reboot. As of 2014, retail sales for the franchise exceeded $15 billion, (Note: Up until 2014 – $13 billion; 2015 – $933 million; 2016 – $915 million; 2017 – $565 million) making it one of the highest-grossing media franchises of all time.

== Television series ==
Series	Season	Episodes		Originally released	
Series	Season	Episodes		First released	Last released
Dora the Explorer	1	25		August 14, 2000	October 29, 2001
Dora the Explorer	2	26		February 13, 2002	July 14, 2003
Dora the Explorer	3	21		October 6, 2003	June 14, 2004
Dora the Explorer	4	27		September 24, 2004	August 5, 2008
Dora the Explorer	5	21		September 15, 2008	October 1, 2010
Dora the Explorer	6	18		November 5, 2010	February 3, 2012
Dora the Explorer	7	19		March 16, 2012	January 16, 2013
Dora the Explorer	8	20	14	March 18, 2013	June 5, 2014
Dora the Explorer	8	20	6	July 7, 2019	August 9, 2019 (Note: The show's run ended on June 5, 2014, with six episodes, however, those episodes did not air in the United States until August 9, 2019, with the premiere of Dora and the Lost City of Gold.)
Go, Diego, Go!	1	20		September 6, 2005	October 15, 2007
Go, Diego, Go!	2	20		October 2, 2006	March 7, 2008
Go, Diego, Go!	3	20		March 21, 2008	July 13, 2013
Go, Diego, Go!	4	20		September 28, 2009	September 16, 2011
Dora and Friends: Into the City!	1	18		August 18, 2014	February 5, 2016
Dora and Friends: Into the City!	2	20		September 10, 2015	February 5, 2017
Dora	1	26		April 12, 2024	
Dora	2	26		September 13, 2024	
Dora	3	26		July 2, 2025	
Dora	4	26		December 19, 2025	

=== Dora the Explorer ===
Dora the Explorer revolved around a young girl named Dora, who is of Latin American origin, and her best friend, Boots the Monkey. Each episode typically began with a problem or goal, prompting the characters to go on a mission to achieve it. The show also served as a Spanish-language teaching tool, helping children learn basic Spanish.

The series originally ran from 2000 to 2014, though a final batch of episodes was aired in 2019.

=== Go, Diego, Go! ===
The second series in the franchise was a spin-off series focused on Dora's cousin Diego and his side of the family, all of whom work as animal rescuers, helping any animal who needs it. The only animated series to focus on a male character, Go, Diego, Go! focused more on teaching animal facts, though other learning skills and the Spanish language are still taught throughout the series. Dora herself and, occasionally, other characters from the original show also appear infrequently throughout the series.

The series aired from 2005 to 2011, though an episode from the third season was not broadcast until 2013 on a different channel for reasons unknown.

=== Dora and Friends: Into the City! ===
The third series in the franchise now featured an older, pre-teen Dora as she navigates an urban environment alongside a new, larger cast of main characters. While the first season largely limited the show's connection to the first series, the second season would bring back numerous characters and locations.

This series aired from 2014 to 2017.

=== Dora ===
The fourth series in the franchise is a complete reboot of the first, featuring largely the same characters and locations. However, the entire voice cast was replaced, with only a few original voice actors making regular appearances. Unlike all preceding shows, Dora is fully computer-animated and uses 3D visuals instead of 2D traditional animation.

The series debuted in 2024, and is set to conclude in 2026.

== Films ==
Film	U.S. release date	Director	Screenwriter	Producers	Status
Dora and the Lost City of Gold	August 9, 2019	James Bobin	Nicholas Stoller and Matthew Robinson	Kristin Burr	Released
Dora and the Search for Sol Dorado	July 2, 2025	Alberto Belli	JT Billings	Kristin Burr	Released

=== Dora and the Lost City of Gold ===
Dora and the Lost City of Gold is a 2019 American adventure comedy film directed by James Bobin, with a screenplay written by Nicholas Stoller and Matthew Robinson, based on a story by Tom Wheeler and Stoller.

=== Dora and the Search for Sol Dorado ===
Directed by Alberto Belli, the film was released in July 2025, and it serves as the reboot by redefining the characters. Samantha Lorraine played the titular role.

== Short film ==
=== Dora and the Fantastical Creatures ===
Dora and the Fantastical Creatures is a 2023 American animated short film directed by William Mata, with a screenplay by Alejandro Bien-Willner and a story by Bien-Willner and Sean Gill.

== Stage adaptations ==
Two stage versions of the series toured North America, the first being "City of Lost Toys", and the second being "Dora's Pirate Adventure". Produced by Nickelodeon and LiveNation, these productions featured live actors portraying the roles of Dora and her friends, including Boots, Diego, Isa, and the Fiesta Trio. Many of the characters wore elaborate foam costumes designed to resemble the Dora characters. Each production featured a structure similar to an episode of the television series. City of Lost Toys featured Christina Bianco as Dora, while Dora's Pirate Adventure featured Danay Ferrer of the band Innosense in the role of Dora and Frankie Grande as Boots. Both productions featured a version of the popular Gloria Estefan song "Get on Your Feet" as the final number of the show. Both productions were conceived by Chris Gifford, creator of the television show, and directed by Gip Hoppe.

There have been three Dora touring companies. The "City of Lost Toys" company and the "Pirate Adventure" company featured actors and crew who were members of Actor's Equity and IATSE, the respective unions for professional actors and stagehands in the United States. The third company performs a shortened version of "Pirate Adventure" and does not employ union personnel. This production is currently touring North America and scheduled to travel to the United Kingdom and France.

== Merchandise ==
Many action figures and playsets are available in many markets, along with cosmetics, hygiene products, ride-ons, coin-operated kiddie rides, books, board games, plush dolls, apparel, handbags, play tents, play kitchens, and more. Licensees include Mattel-owned Fisher-Price in the United States and Holland Publishing in the United Kingdom.

=== Toys ===
In 2004, Lego released four sets based on the characters of the TV series. These include 7330 Dora's Treasure Island, 7331 Diego's Rescue Truck, 7332 Dora and Boots at Play Park, and 7333 Dora and Diego's Animal Adventure.

In 2007, lead paint used by a contract toy manufacturer in China prompted Mattel to issue recalls for nearly a million toys, many of which featured Sesame Street and Nickelodeon characters - including Dora the Explorer. In response, Nickelodeon stated that they would introduce "third-party monitoring" of all manufacturers of products under its brands.

=== Books ===
==== Dora the Explorer series ====
1. Dora's Backpack (ISBN 978-0689847202)
2. Little Star (ISBN 978-0689847219)
3. Happy Mother's Day Mami! (ISBN 978-0689852336)
4. Meet Diego! (ISBN 978-0689859939)
5. Dora's Thanksgiving (ISBN 978-0689858420)
6. Dora Loves Boots (ISBN 978-0689863738)
7. Dora's Book of Manners (ISBN 978-0689865336)
8. Dora Goes to School (ISBN 978-0689864940)
9. Dora's Fairy-Tale Adventure (ISBN 978-0689870125)
10. Dora's Chilly Day (ISBN 978-0689867958)
11. Show Me Your Smile! (ISBN 978-0689871696)
12. Dora's Pirate Adventure (ISBN 978-0689875830)
13. Big Sister Dora! (ISBN 978-0689878466)
14. At the Carnival (ISBN 978-0689858413)
15. Dora's Costume Party! (ISBN 978-1416900108)
16. Dance to the Rescue (ISBN 978-1416902164)
17. Dora's Starry Christmas (ISBN 978-1416902492)
18. Super babies (ISBN 978-1416914853)
19. The Birthday Dance Party (ISBN 978-1416913030)
20. Dora's World Adventure (ISBN 978-1416924470)
21. Dora Climbs Star Mountain (ISBN 978-1416940593)
22. It's Sharing Day! (ISBN 978-1416915751)
23. Dora Had a Little Lamb (ISBN 978-1416933687)
24. Dora Saves Mermaid Kingdom! (ISBN 978-1416938415)
25. Dora and the Stuck Truck (ISBN 978-1416947998)

==== Ready To Read series – Level 1 ====
1. Dora's Picnic (ISBN 978-0689852381)
2. Follow Those Feet! (ISBN 978-0689852398)
3. Dora in the Deep Sea (ISBN 978-0689858451)
4. I Love My Papi! (ISBN 978-0689864957)
5. Say "Cheese!" (ISBN 978-0689864964)
6. The Halloween Cat (ISBN 978-0689867996)
7. Eggs for Everyone! (ISBN 978-0689871764)
8. Just Like Dora! (ISBN 978-0689876752)
9. I Love My Mami! (ISBN 978-1416906506)
10. Puppy Takes a Bath (ISBN 978-1416914839)
11. Around the World! (ISBN 978-1416924784)
12. Dora's Sleepover (ISBN 978-1416915089)
13. Dora Helps Diego! (ISBN 978-1416915096)
14. Dora's Perfect Pumpkin (ISBN 978-1416934387)
15. Dora's Mystery of the Missing Shoes (ISBN 978-1416938248)

==== A Lift-the-Flap Story ====
- Good Night, Dora!: A Lift-the-Flap Story (ISBN 978-0689847745)
- Where Is Boots?: A Lift-the-Flap Story (ISBN 978-0689847752)
- Let's Play Sports!: A Lift-the-Flap Story (ISBN 978-1416933502)
- All Dressed Up!: A Lift-the-Flap Book (ISBN 978-0689877186)

==== Treasury books and collection books ====
- Dora's Ready-to-Read Adventures (ISBN 978-0689878152)
  Contains: "Dora's Picnic", "Follow Those Feet", "Dora in the Deep Sea", "I love my Papi!", "Say 'Cheese'"
- Dora's Storytime Collection (ISBN 978-0689866234)
  Contains: "Dora's Backpack", "Little Star", "Happy Birthday", "Mami!", "Meet Diego!", "Dora Saves the Prince", "Dora's Treasure Hunt", "Good Night", "Dora!"
- Dora's Big Book of Stories (ISBN 978-1416907084)
  Contains: "Dora's Book of Manners", "Dora Goes to School", "Dora's Fairy-Tale Adventure", "Dora's Chilly Day", "Show Me Your Smile!", "Dora's Pirate Adventure", "Big Sister Dora!"

==== Sticker books ====
- Dora's Magic Watering Can (ISBN 978-1416947721)

=== Video games ===
Video games based on the show were released. In Canada, Cheerios offered free Dora the Explorer the Game CD-ROMs in specially marked packages; however, packages sold in Quebec had only the French version. Dora the Explorer: Barnyard Buddies is the first video game based on the show for the home consoles as it was released for the PlayStation in the U.S. in 2003. It was not released in Europe until 2005, when it became one of the last games released for that platform in the region. This coincided with the decline in PlayStation production and the end of development for other PS1 games the following year.

=== Soundtrack ===
Dora The Explorer

Soundtrack album by Dora and Friends
- Released: September 28, 2004
- Genres: Soundtrack, Children's music
- Length: 42:03
- Label: Nickelodeon Records
- Producer: Jed Becker

Track list
No.	Title	Length
1.	"Dora The Explorer Theme"	0:43
2.	"Backpack, Backpack!"	0:25
3.	"I'm The Map!"	0:31
4.	"Travel Song Medley"	1:35
5.	"Let's All Move Like The Animals Do!"	0:53
6.	"I Love My Boots"	0:39
7.	"Reach Up & Catch The Stars!"	0:59
8.	"Fairytale Land"	1:04
9.	"Popping Bubbles"	0:28
10.	"When You Grow Up What Will You Be?"	1:25
11.	"I'm The Grumpy Old Troll"	0:54
12.	"Tenemos Amigos"	0:58
13.	"Super Spies!"	1:02
14.	"Hurry! Hurry!"	1:16
15.	"Magic Music Box"	1:33
16.	"The City of Lost Toys"	2:07
17.	"Feliz Cumpleanos"	1:04
18.	"Boots' Special Day"	0:22
19.	"Un Dia Special"	1:05
20.	"Bate Bate Chocolate"	1:13
21.	"Do The Robot Walk"	0:51
22.	"The Chicken Dance"	0:55
23.	"Super Silly Fiesta"	1:40
24.	"The Itsy Bitsy Spider"	0:49
25.	"The Fix-It Machine"	0:53
26.	"Boots The Monkey!"	0:39
27.	"Mary Had A Little Lamb"	0:31
28.	"Super Map!"	0:33
29.	"Goin' On A Berry Hunt"	0:56
30.	"Bouncy Ball"	0:57
31.	"The Happy Song"	1:42
32.	"Run, Dora, Run!"	0:44
33.	"A Musician I Am"	0:38
34.	"ABC (The Alphabet Song)"	0:31
35.	"Baby Dino"	0:58
36.	"Squeaky I Love You"	0:30
37.	"Swiper No Swiping!"	0:47
38.	"I'm Really Gonna Hit The Ball"	0:49
39.	"Baseball, Baseball, Fun In The Sun"	1:04
40.	"We Did It!"	0:38
41.	"El Coqui"	1:37
42.	"La Lechuza"	1:09
43.	"Buenes Noches"	0:35
44.	"Twinkle Twinkle Little Star"	0:29
Total length:		42:03

== Audiovisual viewing ==
Seasons of Dora the Explorer are available on a variety of streaming or direct-purchase video services.

=== Streaming ===
Streaming service	Country availability	Content	Launch date
10 Play	Australia	Season 7, Episodes 9–18	
Amazon Prime Video	Worldwide	Seasons 1–2	
Paramount+	United States	Seasons 1–8	December 9, 2020
Foxtel Now	Australia	Seasons 1–8	
SkyShowtime	Norway	Seasons 7–8	September 20, 2022
Noggin (Paramount Streaming)	United States	Seasons 1–5	September 1, 2017
Paramount+	Australia	Seasons 1–8	August 11, 2021
Vudu	United States	Seasons 1–8	

=== Direct purchase ===
Direct purchase service	Country availability	Content	Launch date
Apple TV+	Worldwide	Seasons 1–8	March 2020
Google Play	Worldwide	Seasons 1–7	
Microsoft Store	Worldwide	Season 1–8	
