= Big Potato =

(The) Big Potato may refer to:

- Big Potato, a play written by Arthur Laurents
- "Big Potato", nickname of baseball player Carlos Pascual
- "The Big Potato", an episode of the American children's TV series Dora the Explorer
- The Big Potato (landmark), a landmark and tourist attraction in Robertson, New South Wales, Australia
- Big Potato Games, a British board game publisher

== See also ==
- "Charlie Big Potato", song by Skunk Anansie
- Doug, originally thought to be the largest potato recorded
- Jamie O'Rourke and the Big Potato: An Irish Folktale, book by children's author Tomie dePaola
