= Dug =

Dug may refer to:

- past tense of dig
- nipple of a female mammal
- Dug, Phagwara, a village in Kapurthala district of Punjab State, India
- Doug Pinnick (dUg), an American musician
- An alien race in Star Wars
- A talking dog in the Pixar movie Up (2009 film)
- A fictional character in the 2019 Indian animated series Chacha Chaudhary
- Scots for dog
- Another name for Doug (tuber), a tuber in the Cucurbitaceae family

== See also ==
- DUG (disambiguation)
