= DUG =

DUG may refer to:

- Double-stranded uracil-DNA glycosylase, an enzyme
- Bisbee-Douglas International Airport, Arizona
- Developing Unconventional Gas, a series of energy conferences held annually.

== See also ==
- Dug (disambiguation)
