= Dora and the Lost City of Gold =

2019 film by James Bobin

- Theatrical release poster
- Directed by: James Bobin
- Screenplay by: Nicholas Stoller; Matthew Robinson
- Story by: Tom Wheeler; Nicholas Stoller
- Based on: Dora the Explorer by Chris Gifford; Valerie Walsh Valdes; Eric Weiner
- Produced by: Kristin Burr
- Starring: Isabela Moner; Eugenio Derbez; Michael Peña; Eva Longoria; Danny Trejo
- Cinematography: Javier Aguirresarobe
- Edited by: Mark Everson
- Music by: John Debney; Germaine Franco
- Production companies: Paramount Players; Nickelodeon Movies; Walden Media; MRC; Burr! Productions
- Distributed by: Paramount Pictures
- Release date: August 9, 2019
- Running time: 102 minutes
- Country: United States
- Language: English
- Budget: $49 million
- Box office: $120.6 million

Dora and the Lost City of Gold is a 2019 American adventure comedy film based on the Dora the Explorer animated television series, and the first feature film in the franchise. The film was directed by James Bobin and written by Nicholas Stoller and Matthew Robinson, and stars Isabela Moner, Eugenio Derbez, Michael Peña and Eva Longoria, with Danny Trejo as the voice of Boots. The "Lost City of Gold" is based on the legendary Inca city, Paititi.

A live-action Dora film was announced in 2017, and Moner was cast in the title role in May 2018. Filming took place from August to December 2018 in Australia and Peru. John Debney and Germaine Franco composed the film's score.

Dora and the Lost City of Gold was theatrically released in the United States on August 9, 2019, by Paramount Pictures. The film received generally positive reviews from critics, and grossed $121 million against a budget of $49 million. A reboot, Dora and the Search for Sol Dorado, was released in 2025.

== Plot ==
In the Peruvian jungle, 6-year-old Dora Márquez, daughter of jungle explorers Cole and Elena, goes on adventures with her monkey friend Boots, her 7-year-old cousin Diego, and imaginary friends Backpack and Map while thwarting Swiper the thieving fox. One day, Diego and his family leave for Los Angeles while Dora and her parents remain searching for the hidden Inca city of gold, Parapata.

Ten years later, Cole and Elena decipher the location of Parapata and send a now 16-year-old Dora to stay with Diego's family in Los Angeles while they travel to the lost city after she unintentionally proves she's not ready to face danger while exploring. At Diego's high school, Dora meets fellow students Sammy Moore and Randy Warren. The former sees Dora as a rival due to her intelligence, while the latter develops a crush on her. Dora's eccentric behavior culminates in mocking and name-calling by some of her new classmates when she publicly dances to a conga song at the school dance. Embarrassed and humiliated, Diego tells Dora that she is no longer in the jungle, which leads to a fallout between them.

On a class field trip to a museum, Dora, Diego, Sammy, and Randy are lured to its off-exhibit archives, where mercenaries, led by a man named Powell, capture them and fly them to Peru. When they land, a man named Alejandro Gutierrez, who claims to be a friend of Dora's parents, helps them escape, but the mercenaries, aided by Swiper, steal Dora's map. Alejandro reports that Dora's parents have gone missing and the mercenaries are searching for them in hopes of getting into Parapata to steal its treasures. Dora resolves to find her parents first with Alejandro's help, and the other teens agree.

The group travels through attacks from soldiers who guard Parapata known as the Lost Guardians, quicksand, hallucination-inducing spores that turn them into cartoon characters in the style of the original animation, and an Incan puquio. During the journey, Sammy warms up to Dora, who reconciles with Diego and notices that he has a crush on Sammy. Dora and her friends finally reunite with her parents outside the borders of Parapata, but Alejandro reveals himself to be the real leader of the mercenaries and captures them, saying he will free them once he claims the gold. However, Boots helps the teens escape and restores Dora's confidence by communicating with her through imagination. Realizing that the mercenaries are planning to kill Cole and Elena once they have served their purpose, she resolves to find the way inside Parapata so they can use its treasure to bargain for her parents' release.

Inside the hidden city, Dora and the others solve its temple's puzzles and dodge its traps, bringing them to the central shrine. Alejandro, having secretly followed them, arrives as the group reaches its final test, thinks that the gold is the right answer against Dora's warnings and falls into a trap. The Lost Guardians, having apprehended Dora's parents and the mercenaries, confront the teens, but Dora speaks to their queen in Quechua, assuring that the group only came for her parents and to learn about the ancient civilization. Dora figures out that the answer to the test is water, and the Incas allow her and everyone to have a single glimpse of their greatest treasure until Swiper appears and steals the smaller idol, thus angering the gods. As Alejandro and the mercenaries are taken away, Dora regains the idol and puts it back into place.

After the group leaves, Diego and Sammy become a couple and Dora's parents and the teens arrive at her jungle home. Cole and Elena discuss going on another expedition as a family, but Dora decides to return to school in Los Angeles, where she and her friends perform a high school dance to celebrate their victory.

== Cast ==
- Isabela Merced as Dora, a 16-year-old jungle explorer and the main protagonist from Dora the Explorer. She is Cole and Elena's daughter and Diego's cousin. Moner also voices Dora in the animated scene.
  - Madelyn Miranda as young Dora
- Eugenio Derbez as Alejandro, a treasure hunter who introduces himself as a professor at the National University of San Marcos. However, he ends up being the boss of the mercenaries. Some of his known treasure heists include the Crown Jewels of the Ivory Coast and the Comtesse de Vendome. Derbez also voices Alejandro in the animated scene.
- Michael Peña as Cole, a jungle explorer, Dora's father, and Diego's uncle.
- Eva Longoria as Elena, a jungle explorer, Dora's mother, and Diego's aunt.
- Jeff Wahlberg as Diego, Dora's cousin and the main protagonist of Go, Diego, Go! who becomes Sammy's boyfriend. Wahlberg also voices Diego in the animated scene.
  - Malachi Barton as young Diego
- Madeleine Madden as Sammy, a teenage girl who is friends with Dora, Diego and Randy and becomes Diego's girlfriend. Madden also voices Sammy in the animated scene.
- Nicholas Coombe as Randy, a teenage boy who is friends with Dora, Diego and Sammy and has a crush on Dora. Coombe also voices Randy in the animated scene.
- Temuera Morrison as Powell, a mercenary who serves as Alejandro's second-in-command.
- Christopher Kirby as Viper, a mercenary who had a history of being "yo-yo'd".
- Natasa Ristic as Christina X, a female mercenary.
- Christopher Rawlins as a mercenary.
- Adriana Barraza as Abuelita Valerie, Dora and Diego's grandmother.
- Pia Miller as Sabrina, Dora's aunt and Diego's mother.
- Joey Vieira as Nico, Dora's uncle and Diego's father.
- Q'orianka Kilcher as Princess Kawillaka, the ruler of Parapata.
  - Isela Vega as the Old Woman, Princess Kawillaka's old form.

=== Voice cast ===
- Danny Trejo as Boots, Dora's monkey best friend and partner.
  - Dee Bradley Baker provides Boots' vocal effects.
- Benicio del Toro as Swiper, a sneaky red fox who conspires to steal useful things from Dora and has allied with the mercenaries.
- Marc Weiner as Map, an imaginary, anthropomorphic version of Dora's map who shows Dora where she needs to go. Weiner reprises his role from the original series.
- Sasha Toro as Backpack, an imaginary, anthropomorphic version of Dora's backpack who carries any item that Dora may need. Toro reprises her role from the first four seasons of the original series.

== Production ==
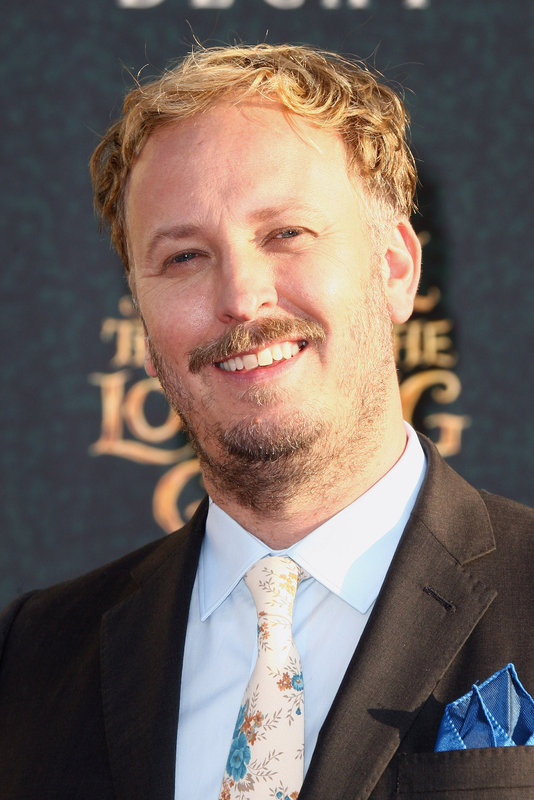
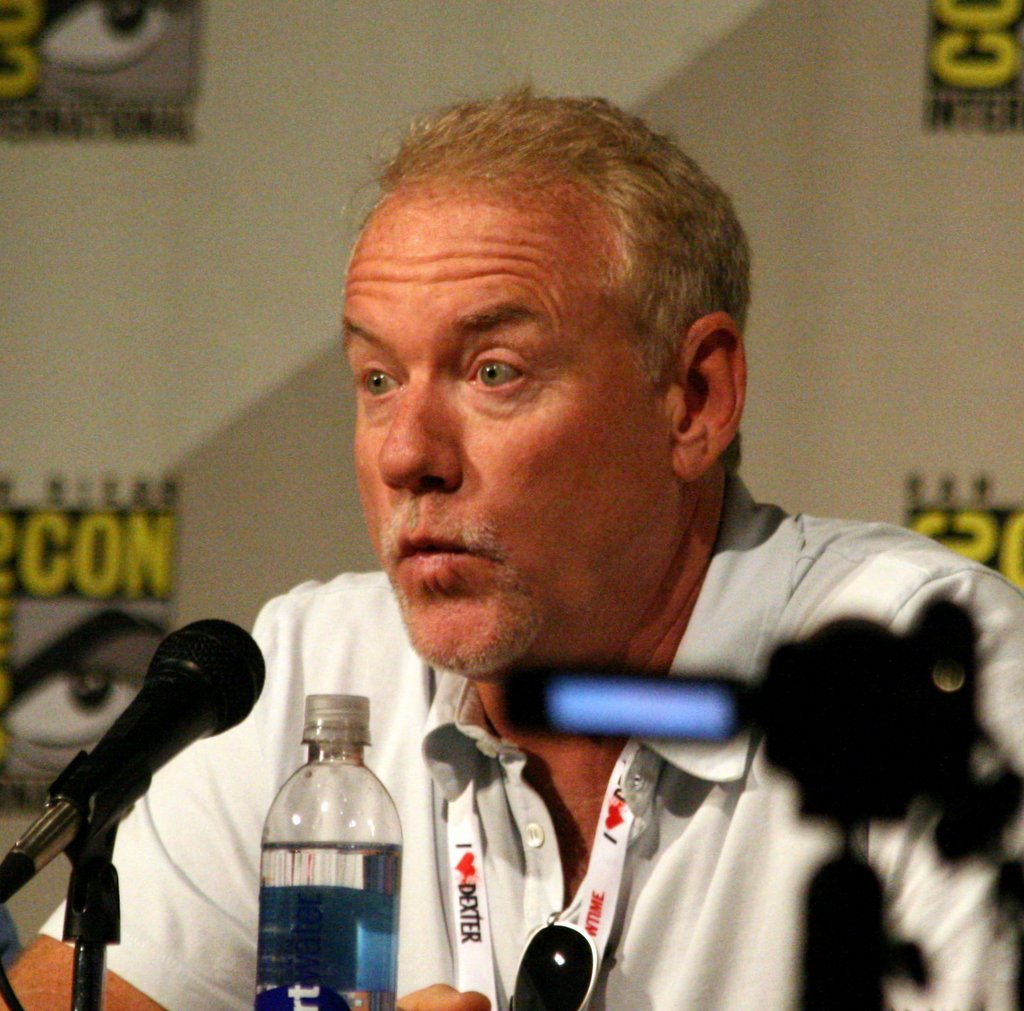
Director James Bobin (left) and Composer John Debney (right).

On October 24, 2017, a deal was struck for a live-action version of the television series to be made, with James Bobin directing. Nicholas Stoller and Danielle Sanchez-Witzel were hired to pen a script. Michael Bay's Platinum Dunes was announced as producer, though Bay and the company were ultimately not involved.

The film depicts a teenage version of Dora It was issued an initial release date of August 2, 2019. In May 2018, Isabela Moner was cast to play Dora. Eugenio Derbez began negotiations to join in June, and was confirmed to appear in July. Micke Moreno was originally cast to play Diego, but withdrew and was replaced by Jeff Wahlberg. Eva Longoria and Michael Peña were cast as Dora's parents that August. Madeleine Madden also joined the cast of the film. In October, Q'orianka Kilcher was added to the cast, and in November, Pia Miller was set to play Dora's aunt Sabrina. In December 2018, Benicio del Toro joined as the voice of Swiper, and in March 2019, Danny Trejo announced that he had been cast as the voice of Boots the Monkey.

In an interview with Forbes, Moner stated that she learned Quechua language for the character. She said that the film would "take audiences to Machu Picchu" to "explore the Incan culture," and commented that "Dora is very cultured and she knows everything about everything," and that she "doesn't have a defined ethnicity." Filming began on August 6, 2018, on the Gold Coast, Queensland, Australia, and concluded on December 7, 2018. On May 3, 2019, it was revealed that Marc Weiner would be reprising his role as the voice of Map from the animated series.

Visual effects were provided by Mill Film, Moving Picture Company and Cheap Shot VFX, under the supervision of Lindy DeQuattro, Andy Brown, and Richard Little. Visualization services were provided by Proof Inc., with 2D animation provided by Blink Industries. Previsualization incorporated a process called “SketchVis,” in which 2D animators created rough drawings over the visual effects plates to block and time animated characters’ movements. This provided more expressive reference for the 3D animators, while the brevity of the process allowed for experimentation and earlier test screenings.

== Release ==
The film was released on August 9, 2019, the same day that the 2000 animated television series ended. It was previously slated for August 2, 2019.

=== Home media ===
Dora and the Lost City of Gold was released on Digital HD on November 5, 2019, and later on DVD and Blu-ray on November 19, 2019. The film is also available on Amazon Prime and Paramount+.

== Reception ==
=== Box office ===
Dora and the Lost City of Gold grossed $60.5 million in the United States and Canada, and $60.1 million in other territories for a worldwide total of $120.6 million against a production budget of $49 million.

In the United States and Canada, the film was released alongside The Kitchen, The Art of Racing in the Rain, Scary Stories to Tell in the Dark and Brian Banks, and was projected to gross $15–20 million from 3,500 theaters in its opening weekend. The film made $6.7 million on its first day, including $1.25 million from Thursday night previews. It went into debut to $17 million, finishing fourth at the box office behind Hobbs & Shaw, The Lion King and Scary Stories to Tell in the Dark; 46% of its audience was Latino, while 32% were Caucasian, 11% African-American and 10% Asian. It dropped 51% in its second weekend to $8.5 million, finishing sixth. It then made $5.3 million in its third weekend and $4.1 million in its fourth, and $2.7 million in its fifth.

=== Critical response ===
On review aggregator website Rotten Tomatoes, the film holds an approval rating of 85% based on 156 reviews, with an average rating of 6.6/10. The site's critical consensus reads, "Led by a winning performance from Isabela Moner, Dora and the Lost City of Gold is a family-friendly adventure that retains its source material's youthful spirit." Metacritic gave the film a weighted average score of 63 out of 100, based on 23 critics, indicating "generally favorable" reviews. Audiences polled by CinemaScore gave the film an average grade of "A" on an A+ to F scale, while PostTrak reported that adult and children filmgoers gave it an average of 4.5 and 3.5 stars out of 5, respectively.

Peter Debruge of Variety wrote, "Whereas most of the cast (and especially Derbez) play broad, borderline-slapstick versions of their characters, Moner has the wide eyes and ever-chipper attitude we associate with Dora, but adds a level of charisma the animated character couldn't convey." Robbie Collin of The Telegraph stated that "Dora and the Lost City of Gold has contraptions to spare – falling platforms, lava pits, a water slide that pays homage to The Goonies – but its storytelling is commendably lean and faff-free. In the depths of summer break boredom, it's a treasure horde of fun."

== Future ==
On February 15, 2022, Paramount+ announced the development of a live action series, said to be "in the same spirit as the recent live action film for older audiences".

=== Reboot ===
In July 2025, a live-action film, Dora and the Search for Sol Dorado, was released on Nickelodeon and on Paramount+, as a second installment of the Dora the Explorer series. However, Dora and the Search for Sol Dorado is considered to be a reboot of the original Dora the Explorer storyline, as the film establishes a new origin story for Dora and features a different cast. The two films notably differ in that Isabela Moner was replaced by Samantha Lorraine in the role of Dora, and Alberto Belli replaced James Bobin as director.
