= List of Dora the Explorer home media releases =

This is a list of home video releases of Dora the Explorer.

== VHS releases ==
Over thirty titles were released on the format, mostly by Paramount Home Entertainment.

Title	Episodes	Release date
Swing into Action! Spanish: ¡Activate!	Sticky Tape; Berry Hunt	June 5, 2001; Spanish: June 26, 2001
Wish on a Star Spanish: Pide Un Deseo a La Estrella	Little Star; Wizzle Wishes	June 5, 2001; Spanish: June 26, 2001
To the Rescue Spanish: Al Rescate	Three Little Piggies; Lost and Found	August 21, 2001; Spanish: August 21, 2001
Dora Saves the Prince	Dora Saves the Prince; El Coquí	February 5, 2002
Dora's Backpack Adventure Spanish: La Mochillo de Dora	Backpack!; Big River	May 28, 2002; Spanish: August 27, 2002
Christmas! Spanish: ¡Navidad!	A Present for Santa; ¡Rápido, Tico!	September 24, 2002; Spanish: October 26, 2004
Move to the Music	Dora, La Músico; Pablo's Flute	November 5, 2002
Map Adventures French: Suúvez la Carte	Lost Map; Super Map	February 4, 2003; French: _
City of Lost Toys	The Lost City; Lost Squeaky	June 3, 2003
Rhymes and Riddles	Dora Had a Little Lamb; Call Me Mr. Riddles	August 26, 2003
Cowgirl Dora	Pinto, the Pony Express; A Letter for Swiper	October 7, 2003
Meet Diego!	Meet Diego!; To the South Pole	October 7, 2003
Pirate Adventure	Dora's Pirate Adventure	January 27, 2004
Egg Hunt French: La Chasse aux Oeufs	Egg Hunt; El Día del las Madres	March 2, 2004; French: _
Super Silly Fiesta!	The Super Silly Fiesta; Boots' Special Day	June 1, 2004
Dora's Halloween	Boo!; The Missing Piece	August 31, 2004
Fairytale Adventure	Dora's Fairytale Adventure	October 5, 2004
Catch the Stars	Star Catcher; Star Mountain	January 11, 2005
Big Sister Dora	Big Sister Dora; Dora Saves the Game	March 22, 2005
It's a Party!	Daisy, La Quinceañera; The Big Piñata	May 3, 2005
Super Babies	Super Babies; Catch the Babies	July 19, 2005
Dance to the Rescue	Dora's Dance to the Rescue	October 11, 2005
Save the Day!	Dora and Diego to the Rescue!; Swiper the Explorer	January 10, 2006
Dora's First Trip	Dora's First Trip; Best Friends	April 11, 2006
Animal Adventures	Save Diego; Baby Jaguar's Roar	June 13, 2006
We're a Team!	We're a Team; Baseball Boots	August 15, 2006
World Adventure!	Dora's World Adventure	October 10, 2006

== DVD releases ==
Over sixty titles were released on the format, mostly by Paramount Home Entertainment.

Title	Episodes	Release date
Map Adventures	Lost Map; Super Map!; Three Little Piggies; Lost and Found	Region 1: February 4, 2003; Region 2 (UK): November 1, 2004, August 29, 2005
City of Lost Toys	The Lost City; Lost Squeaky; Sticky Tape; Berry Hunt	Region 1: June 3, 2003; Region 2 (UK): February 5, 2005; Region 2 (South Africa): June 4, 2012; Region 4: November 30, 2006
Rhymes and Riddles	Dora Had a Little Lamb; Call Me Mr. Riddles; Backpack!; Big River	Region 1: August 26, 2003; Region 2 (South Africa): November 21, 2011; Region 4: May 28, 2014, August 28, 2014
Cowgirl Dora	Pinto, the Pony Express; A Letter for Swiper; Choo-Choo!; Hic-Boom-Ohhh!	Region 1: October 7, 2003
Meet Diego! Bonjour Diego! (Region 1 – Canada and Region 2 - France); Conoce a Diego (Region 2 – Spain)	Meet Diego!; To the South Pole; Little Star; Wizzle Wishes	Region 1: October 7, 2003; Region 1 (Canada): March 6, 2007; Region 2 (France): August 24, 2005, February 3, 2010; Region 2 (Spain): _; Region 2 (South Africa): April 4, 2011; Region 2 (UK): May 8, 2006
Pirate Adventure	Dora's Pirate Adventure; Dora Saves the Prince; El Coqui	Region 1: January 27, 2004; Region 2 (UK): March 27, 2006; Region 2 (South Africa): February 7, 2011; Region 4: November 30, 2006
Egg Hunt	Egg Hunt; El Día del las Madres; Dora, La Músico; Pablo's Flute	Region 1: March 2, 2004; Region 2 (UK): March 14, 2005; Region 2 (South Africa): April 19, 2010; Region 4: March 15, 2007
Super Silly Fiesta!	The Super Silly Fiesta; Boots' Special Day; Stuck Truck; The Big Potato	Region 1: June 1, 2004; Region 2 (UK): July 24, 2006 March 9, 2018; Region 2 (South Africa): June 13, 2011; Region 4: November 30, 2006
Dora's Halloween	Boo!; The Missing Piece; To the Monkey Bars; The Big Storm	Region 1: August 31, 2004; Region 2 (UK): October 9, 2005 October 5, 2009; Region 2 (South Africa): October 8, 2012; Region 4: May 31, 2009
Fairytale Adventure (Region 1–2004 Only); Dora's Fairytale Adventure (Region 1 & 4)	Dora's Fairytale Adventure; What Happens Next?; The Magic Stick	Region 1: October 5, 2004; Region 2 (UK): March 7, 2005; Region 4: July 5, 2007
Dora's Christmas! Las Navidades de Dora (Region 2 – Spain)	A Present for Santa; ¡Rápido, Tico!; Quack! Quack!; School Pet	Region 1: October 26, 2004; Region 2 (Spain): _; Region 2 (South Africa): November 23, 2009; Region 2 (UK): November 8, 2007 October 31, 2011; Region 4: November 20, 2006 November 8, 2007 October 29, 2009
Catch the Stars	Star Catcher; Star Mountain; Louder!; Hide and Go Seek	Region 1: January 11, 2005; Region 2 (UK): October 5/10, 2005; Region 2 (South Africa): August 23, 2010
Big Sister Dora	Big Sister Dora; Dora Saves the Game; Job Day; A Letter for Swiper	Region 1: March 22, 2005; Region 2 (UK): March 9, 2018 July 30, 2007; Region 2 (South Africa): July 2, 2012; Region 4: September 6, 2007
It's a Party!	Daisy, La Quinceañera; The Big Piñata; Surprise; The Fix It Machine	Region 1: May 3, 2005; Region 2 (UK): March 17, 2008 March 9, 2018; Region 4: March 13, 2008
Super Babies	Super Babies; Catch the Babies; Baby Dino; ¡Por Favor!	Region 1: July 19, 2005; Region 2 (UK): July 14, 2008 May 28, 2014; Region 4: September 4, 2008 May 3, 2011 May 28, 2014
Dance to the Rescue	Dora's Dance to the Rescue; Rescue, Rescue, Rescue!; León, the Circus Lion	Region 1: October 11, 2005; Region 2 (UK): October 16, 2006 September 8, 2011; Region 4: June 19, 2008
Save the Day!	Dora and Diego to the Rescue; Swiper the Explorer; Boots' Cuddly Dinosaur; Roberto the Robot	Region 1: January 10, 2006; Region 2 (UK): February 16, 2009; Region 4: April 2, 2009
Dora's First Trip	Dora's First Trip; Best Friends; Tree House; Chocolate Tree	Region 1: April 11, 2006 December 14, 2017
Animal Adventures; Adventuras Animales (Region 2 – Spain)	Save Diego!; Baby Jaguar's Roar; Click!; Hic-Boom-Ohhh!	Region 1: June 13, 2006; Region 2 (Spain): November 3, 2010
We're a Team! ¡Somos un Equipo! (Region 2 – Spain)	We're a Team!; Baseball Boots; Bouncing Ball; Choo Choo	Region 1: August 15, 2006; Region 2 (Spain): October 11, 2010 November 3, 2010
World Adventure!	Dora's World Adventure!; Journey to the Purple Planet; The Golden Explorers	Region 1: October 10, 2006; Region 2 (UK): September 24, 2007 February 14, 2011; Region 2 (South Africa): December 5, 2011
Musical School Days; Días musicales (Region 2 – Spain)	La Maestra de Música; Boots to the Rescue; The Happy Old Troll; A Letter for Swiper	Region 1: February 13, 2007; Region 2 (Spain): November 18, 2009; Region 4: December 3, 2009
Shy Rainbow; El arco iris tímido (Region 2 – Spain)	The Shy Rainbow; A Crown for King Juan el Bobo; Te Amo; Region 1 & 2 Only: Bugga Bugga; Region 4 Only: Journey to the Purple Planet	Region 1: April 3, 2007; Region 2 (Spain): March 11, 2010 April 14, 2010; Region 2 (UK): May 24, 2010; Region 4: June 3, 2010
Summer Explorer; Exploradora de Verano (Region 2 – Spain)	Baby Crab; Mixed-Up Seasons; We All Scream for Ice Cream; Beaches	Region 1: July 3, 2007; Region 2 (Spain): June 20, 2012
Dora Saves the Mermaids	Dora Saves the Mermaids!; Fish Out of Water; Treasure Island	Region 1: September 25, 2007; Region 2 (UK): August 10, 2007 October 8, 2007; Region 4: July 3, 2008
Puppy Power!	Dora's Got a Puppy; Save the Puppies; Grandma's House; Region 1 Only: ABC Animals; Region 2 & 4 Only: Doctor Dora	Region 1: November 6, 2007; Region 2 (UK): March 29, 2010; Region 4: September 24, 2009
Undercover Dora	Super Spies; Super Spies 2: The Swiping Machine; Rojo, the Fire Truck; Pinto the Pony Express	Region 1: January 15, 2008; Region 4: March 4, 2010
Dora Saves the Snow Princess; Dora salva a la Princesa de la Nieve (Region 2 – Spain)	Dora Saves the Snow Princess; Region 1 Only: Dora's Jack-in-the-Box; Bark, Bark to Play Park!; Region 2 & 4 Only: Doctor Dora; Whose Birthday Is It?	Region 1: September 30, 2008; Region 2 (Spain): November 21, 2012; Region 2 (UK): November 8, 2003 March 11, 2008; Region 4: July 2, 2009
Dora Celebrates Three Kings Day! ¡Dora celebra el día de los Reyes Magos! (Region 2 – Spain)	Dora Saves Three Kings Day; Isa's Unicorn Flowers; Benny's Big Race; The Backpack Parade	Region 1: October 7, 2008; Region 2 (Spain): December 19/21, 2012; Region 2 (South Africa): November 12, 2012
Singing Sensation!	—N/a	Region 1: November 4, 2008; Region 2 (UK): July 25, 2011; Region 4: June 22, 2011 June 30, 2011
Dora and the 3 Little Pigs; Dora y los 3 cerditos (Region 2 (Spain))	Dora Saves the Three Little Piggies; The Mayan Adventure; Bouncy Boots; The Big Red Chicken's Magic Show	Region 1: January 13, 2009; Region 2 (Spain): February 8, 2012; Region 2 (UK): February 13, 2012; Region 4: May 28, 2014
Super Babies' Dream Adventure	Super Babies' Dream Adventure; Dora Helps the Birthday Wizzle; Pirate Treasure Hunt; Benny's Treasure	Region 1: May 26, 2009; Region 2 (UK): April 11, 2011; Region 4: June 2/8, 2011/November 19, 2018
Dora Saves the Crystal Kingdom; Rescata el Reino de Cristal (Region 2 – Spain)	Dora Saves the Crystal Kingdom; First Day of School; Boots' Banana Wish	Region 1: September 22, 2009 March 6, 2012; Region 2 (Spain): April 4, 2012; Region 2 (UK): October 19, 2009; Region 4: July 1, 2010
Dora's Christmas Carol Adventure (Region 1 & 2 – UK 2009 only); Christmas Carol Adventure (Region 2 & 4); Aventura De Navidad (Region 2 – Spain)	Dora's Christmas Carol Adventure	Region 1: November 3, 2009; Region 2 (Spain): November 3, 2010; Region 2 (South Africa): November 1, 2010; Region 2 (UK): June 1, 2009 November 4/15, 2010; Region 4: November 4, 2010
Let's Explore! Dora's Greatest Adventures	Lost Map; Hide and Go Seek; Journey to the Purple Planet; Rescue, Rescue, Rescue!; Star Catcher; Star Mountain; Boots to the Rescue; Swiper the Explorer	Region 1: February 2, 2010
Explore the Earth	Mixed-Up Seasons; Beaches; Region 1 Only: To the South Pole; Save Diego; Region 2 & 4 Only: Star Catcher; Star Mountain; Big River; Fish Out of Water	Region 1: April 13, 2010; Region 2 (Spain): February 16, 2011; Region 2 (UK): February 14, 2011; Region 4: May 28, 2014
Dora's Big Birthday Adventure	Dora's Big Birthday Adventure; Wizzle Wishes; Region 1 Only: Dora Helps the Birthday Wizzle; Region 2 & 4 Only: We All Scream for Ice Cream	Region 1: August 3, 2010; Region 2 (UK): September 27, 2010; Region 4: September 9, 2010
Dora's Slumber Party	Boots' Cuddly Dinosaur; Louder!; The Lost City; Little Star; Super Babies' Dream Adventure; Dora Had a Little Lamb	Region 1: September 14, 2010
It's Haircut Day! A Cortarse El Pelo (Region 2 – Spain)	Dora's Hair-Raising Adventure; Happy Birthday, Super Babies; Baby Winky Goes Home!; Dora's Pegaso Adventure	Region 1: May 3, 2011; Region 2 (Spain): November 20, 2013; Region 4: May 29, 2013
Dora's Ballet Adventures; La Función de Baile de Dora (Region 2 – Spain)	Dora's Ballet Adventure; The Super Silly Fiesta 2.0; Dora, La Músico; Surprise	Region 1: August 30, 2011; Region 2 (Spain): July 20, 2011; Region 2 (UK): May 11, 2009; Region 4: September 1, 2011 May 28, 2014
Dora's Halloween Parade; El desfile de Halooween de Dora (Region 2 – Spain)	Halloween Parade; Boo!; The Backpack Parade; Dora, La Músico	Region 1: August 30, 2011; Region 2 (Spain): September 25, 2013; Region 2 (South Africa): October 14, 2013; Region 2 (UK): September 30, 2013; Region 4: October 2, 2013
Dora's Enchanted Forest Adventures; Las Aventuras en el Bosque (Region 2 – Spain)	Tale of the Unicorn King; The Secret of Atlantis; Dora Saves King Unicornio	Region 1: September 13, 2011; Region 2 (Spain): November 23/30, 2011; Region 2 (UK): November 14, 2011; Region 4: November 3, 2010
Dora Loves Boots (Region 1); First Bike (Region 2 – UK & 4); Dora le Premier Velo (Region 2 – Spain)	Boots' First Bike; ¡Vacaciones!; The Big Red Chicken's Magic Wand; Region 1 Only: Bouncy Boots; Region 4 & 2 Only: Pablo's Flute	Region 1: December 27, 2011; Region 2 (Spain): March 27, 2016; Region 2 (UK): July 23, 2012; Region 4: June 20, 2012 October 12, 2012
Dora's Easter Adventure; Una aventura en Pascua (Region 2 – Spain)	Dora's Easter Adventure; The Grumpy Old Troll Gets Married; Dora in Troll Land	Region 1: February 14, 2012; Region 2 (Spain): March 13, 2013; Region 2 (South Africa): March 25, 2013; Region 2 (UK): March 25, 2013; Region 4: March 6, 2013
Dora's Rescue in Mermaid Kingdom; Dora al Rescate en el Reino de las Sirenas (Region 2 – Spain)	Dora's Rescue in Mermaid Kingdom; Dora's Moonlight Adventure; Region 1 Only: Benny the Castaway; Region 4 & 2 Only: Dora's Jack-in-the-Box	Region 1: June 26, 2012; Region 2 (Spain): June 6/12, 2013; Region 2 (UK): June 17, 2013; Region 2 (South Africa): June 3, 2013; Region 4: June 26, 2013
Dora's Fantastic Gymnastics Adventure; La Gimnasia Fantastica De Dora (Region 2 – Spain)	Dora's Fantastic Gymnastics Adventure; A Ribbon for Pinto; Swiper's Favorite Things	Region 1: July 31, 2012; Region 2 (Spain): September 19, 2012; Region 2 (UK): August 20, 2012; Region 4: September 12, 2012
Dora's Royal Rescue; Al rescate real (Region 2 – Spain)	Dora's Royal Rescue; Dora's Knighthood Adventure!; Fish Out of Water	Region 1: October 2, 2012; Region 2 (Spain): March 12, 2014; Region 2 (UK): October 29, 2012; Region 4: October 24, 2012
Dora's Butterfly Ball	The Butterfly Ball; ¡Vamos a Pintar!; ¡Feliz Día de los Padres!	Region 1: February 12, 2013; Region 4: February 26, 2014
Dora Rocks! ¡Canta con Dora! (Region 2 – Spain)	Baby Bongo's Big Music Show; Little Map	Region 1: June 4, 2013; Region 2 (Spain): January 15, 2014; Region 2 (South Africa): July 21, 2014; Region 4: November 6, 2013
Dora's Great Roller Skate Adventure; La Adventura de Dora Sobre Ruedas (Region 2 – Spain)	Check Up Day; School Science Fair	Region 1: September 10, 2013; Region 2 (Spain): May 15, 2015; Region 2 (South Africa): May 4, 2015; Region 4: March 18, 2015
Dora's Ice Skating Spectacular	Catch That Shape Train; Dora and Perrito to the Rescue	Region 1: November 5, 2013; Region 4: June 3, 2015 July 1, 2015
Dora in Wonderland; Dora en el País de las Maravillas (Region 2 – Spain)	Dora in Wonderland; Book Explorers	Region 1: March 4, 2014; Region 2 (Spain): July 4, 2014; Region 2 (South Africa): August 8, 2014; Region 4: June 25, 2014
Super Soccer Showdown; El Super Partido de Futbol de Dora (Region 2 – Spain)	Dora's Super Soccer Showdown; Dora and Diego's Amazing Animal Circus; The Mayan Adventure; Dora Saves the Game	Region 2 (Spain): May 28, 2014; Region 2 (UK): September 14, 2006 June 9, 2014; Region 4: April 9, 2014
Perrito's Big Surprise; La Gran Sorpresa de Perrito (Region 2 – Spain)	Perrito's Big Surprise; Bark, Bark to Play Park!; Benny the Castaway	Region 2 (Spain): September 4/11, 2013; Region 2 (UK): September 16, 2013 March 9, 2018; Region 2 (South Africa): September 9, 2013; Region 4: September 4, 2013 May 28, 2014
Dora + Boots: Best Friends Forever	Riding the Roller Coaster Rocks; Dora's First Trip; Best Friends; Big River; Boots' Special Day; Boots' Cuddly Dinosaur; Baseball Boots; Call Me Mr. Riddles	Region 1: May 27, 2014; Region 2 (UK): July 13, 2009
Dora's Magical Sleepover; La Fiesta Mágica de Pijamas (Region 2 – Spain)	Dora's Museum Sleepover Adventure; Doctor Dora; Dora and Sparky's Riding Adventure!; Dora's Super Soccer Showdown	Region 1: June 24, 2014; Region 2 (Spain): December 5, 2014; Region 2 (UK): December 25, 2013; Region 4: January 7, 2015
Dora Saves Fairytale Land; Dora Salva el País de los Cuentos (Region 2 – Spain)	Riding the Roller Coaster Rocks; Kittens in Mittens	Region 1: June 2, 2015 April 21, 2015; Region 2 (Spain): July 17, 2015; Region 4: November 4/5, 2015
It's a Puppy Party; Fiesta de cachorros (Region 2 – Spain)	Puppies Galore; Dora and Boots Help the Fairy Godmother; Bark, Bark to Play Park!; Save the Puppies	Region 2 (Spain): May 11, 2016; Region 4: June 16, 2016
Dora's Dinosaur Journey ¡El viaje de los dinosaurios de Dora! (Region 2 – Spain)	Dora and Diego in the Time of Dinosaurs; Dora and the Very Sleepy Bear; Dora's Animalito Adventure; Dora's Rainforest Talent Show	Region 2 (Spain): February 5, 2016; Region 4: April 7, 2016
Night Light Adventure; Dora la exploradora: La lamparilla (Region 2 – Spain)	Dora's Night Light Adventure; Dora's Moonlight Adventure; Verde's Birthday Party!; Let's Go to Music School	Region 2 (Spain): September 7, 2016; Region 4: November 2, 2016

== DVD releases with episode collections, including Dora the Explorer ==
Over thirty DVDs were released, which featured one episode each of a variety of television series distributed by Nickelodeon at the time besides Dora the Explorer, including The Backyardigans, Blue's Clues, Blue's Room, Bubble Guppies, The Fresh Beat Band, Go, Diego, Go!, Jack's Big Music Show, LazyTown, Little Bill, Max & Ruby, Mutt & Stuff, Ni Hao, Kai-lan, Oswald, PAW Patrol, Team Umizoomi, Wonder Pets!, and Yo Gabba Gabba!, usually six on each DVD.

Title	Episode	Release date
Nick Jr. Holiday	A Present for Santa	Region 1: September 24, 2002
Nick Jr. Celebrates Spring!	Egg Hunt	Region 1: March 2, 2004
Nick Jr. Favorites: Volume 1	The Lost City	Region 1: May 24, 2005
Nick Jr. Favorites: Volume 2	Super Map	Region 1: October 18, 2005
Nick Jr. Favorites: Volume 3	Meet Diego!	Region 1: February 7, 2006
Nick Jr. Favorites: Volume 4	¡Rápido, Tico!	Region 1: June 6, 2006
Nick Jr. Favorites: Holiday	To the South Pole	Region 1: September 26, 2006
Nick Jr. Favorites: Volume 5	Boots's Special Day	Region 1: March 13, 2007
Nick Jr. Favorites: Volume 6	Backpack!	Region 1: August 7, 2007
Sleepytime Stories	Little Star	Region 1: April 15, 2008
All About Fall!	School Pet	Region 1: July 29, 2008
All-Star Sports Day	Baseball Boots	Region 1: March 10, 2009
Celebrate Family!	Grandma's House	Region 1: June 9, 2009
Animal Friends!	ABC Animals	Region 1: September 15, 2009
We Love Our Friends	Best Friends	Region 1: January 5, 2010
Go Green!	Bugga Bugga	Region 1: March 30, 2010
The First Day of School	First Day of School	Region 1: July 13, 2010
Happy Halloween	Boo!	Region 1: August 24, 2010
Sisters and Brothers	Big Sister Dora	Region 1: February 8, 2011
Food with Friends!	El Día del las Madres	Region 1: May 17, 2011
Summer Vacation	Baby Crab	Region 1: June 21, 2011
Merry Christmas! ¡Feliz Navidad! (Region 2 – Spain)	A Present for Santa	Region 1: October 4, 2011; Region 2 (Spain): December 3, 2012; Region 4: November 7, 2012
Dance to the Music; Baila con la Música (Region 2 – Spain)	La Maestra de Música	Region 1: February 28, 2012; Region 2 (Spain): April 10, 2013; Region 4: March 20, 2013
Let's Learn: 123s Impariamo A Contare (Region 2 – Italy); Aprendamos a contar (Region 2 – Spain)	Pepe's School Day Adventure	Region 1: January 15, 2013 June 24, 2014; Region 2 (Italy): July 23, 2014; Region 2 (Spain): June 18, 2014
Let's Learn: ABCs; Aprendamos a Leer (Region 2 – Spain)	ABC Animals	Region 1: January 15, 2013; Region 2 (Spain): January 22, 2014; Region 4: February 5, 2014
Once Upon a Rhyme	Dora Saves the Three Little Piggies	Region 1: April 30, 2013
Let's Learn: Colors (Region 1); Impariamo I Colori (Region 2 – Italy); Aprendamos los colores (Region 2 – Spain); Let's Learn: Colours (Region 4)	Quack! Quack!	Region 1: July 23, 2013; Region 2 (Italy): September 24, 2014; Region 2 (Spain): August 29, 2014; Region 4: September 10, 2014
Rootin' Tootin' Wild West	Pinto, the Pony Express	Region 1: August 6, 2013
Let's Learn: Patterns and Shapes; Impariamo Le Fantasie e Le Forme (Region 2 – Italy); Aprendamos Fantasías y Formas (Region 2 – Spain)	Catch That Shape Train	Region 1: September 9, 2014; Region 2 (Italy): March 25, 2015; Region 2 (Spain): March 20, 2015; Region 4: March 18, 2015
Springtime Adventures	Tale of the Unicorn King	Region 1: February 17, 2015
Let's Learn: S.T.E.M. (Region 1); Aprendamos Ciencia Y Matemáticas (Region 2 – Spain); Let's Learn – Science And Math (Region 4)	School Science Fair	Region 1: April 28, 2015; Region 2 (Spain): September 18, 2015; Region 4: September 9, 2015
Let's Learn: Kindness	¡Por Favor!	Region 1: July 21, 2015
Puppy Palooza!	Puppies Galore	Region 1: August 25, 2015

=== Bonus episodes of Dora the Explorer on DVD releases of other Nickelodeon shows ===
DVD name	Episodes	Release date
Go Diego Go!: Safari Rescue	"School Pet"	Region 4: March 18, 2008
Go Diego Go!: Moonlight Rescue	"We All Scream For Ice Cream"	Region 4: March 18, 2008
Go Diego Go!: Great Gorilla	"A Crown for King Juan el Bobo"	Region 4: June 3, 2008
Go Diego Go!: Lion Cub Rescue	"Dora and Diego to the Rescue"	Region 4: January 26, 2010
Go Diego Go!: The Great Panda Adventure	"Save Diego"	Region 4: April 7, 2011
Go Diego Go!: Diego's Ultimate Rescue League	"Stuck Truck"	Region 4: August 31, 2010
Go Diego Go!: Diego Saves the World	"Baby Dino"	Region 4: April 12, 2011
Go Diego Go!: Fiercest Animal Rescue	"Baby Jaguar's Roar"	Region 4: June 19, 2013

== Game Boy Advance Video releases ==
Only one GBA Pak featuring Dora the Explorer episodes was released.

Title	Episodes	Release date
Dora the Explorer, Volume 1	Three Little Piggies; The Big River	May 14, 2004; August 4, 2004

== See also ==
- List of Dora the Explorer episodes
