= List of Dora the Explorer episodes =

Dora the Explorer is an American animated television series created by Chris Gifford, Valerie Walsh Valdes, and Eric Weiner that premiered on Nickelodeon on August 14, 2000. The series is produced by Nickelodeon Animation Studio and is one of the longest-running series that aired on the Nick Jr. block.

== Series overview ==
Season	Episodes	Originally released	
Season	Episodes	First released	Last released
Pilot		June 12, 1999	
1	25	August 14, 2000	October 29, 2001
2	26	February 13, 2002	July 14, 2003
3	21	October 6, 2003	June 14, 2004
4	27	September 24, 2004	August 5, 2008
5	21	September 15, 2008	October 1, 2010
6	18	November 5, 2010	February 3, 2012
7	19	March 16, 2012	January 16, 2013
8	20	March 18, 2013	August 9, 2019 (Note: The series officially ended on June 5, 2014. Six additional episodes subsequently aired in the United States from July 7 to August 9, 2019, to coincide with the release of Dora and the Lost City of Gold.)

== Episodes ==
=== Pilot (1999) ===
Before the show premiered, a 15-second animation test and a 15-minute pilot episode were produced.

Title	Directed by	Original release date	Prod. code
"Dora the Explorer"	Jed Miller and Fred Nicks	June 12, 1999	TBA
The synopsis of this pilot parallels the episode "Beaches". Note: This pilot features prototypes of the main characters, sometimes with significantly different designs, including Dora (green-eyes, not with brown eyes), Boots (different appearance and not wearing boots), Benny (a brown bull, not blue, called "Benito"), Tico (a blue Skunk with orange hair, not a purple squirrel with pink hair), Swiper (unchanged), Backpack, Map, Isa, the Fiesta Trio, and Val the Octopus.

=== Season 1 (2000–01) ===
No. overall	No. in season	Title	Animation directed by	Written by	Storyboard by	Original release date	Prod. code
1	1	"The Legend of the Big Red Chicken" "The Big Red Chicken"	Steve Socki and Arne Wong	Eric Weiner	Tina Kugler and Ysty Veluz	August 14, 2000	101
After reading a big red book, entitled "The Legend of the Big Red Chicken", about a very small chicken that wished upon a chicken constellation to gain enormous size, Dora and Boots, following Map's directions, traverse two obstacles, a wooden bridge (broken, but fixed by Dora with Señor Tucán's help) and a wooden gate (locked, but opened by Dora with the recovered four-pointed key), to get to the Big Red Hill to meet the Big Red Chicken. Their journey is continually hampered by Swiper, who initially unsuccessfully attempts to steal the book and then successfully steals the four-pointed key. They eventually reach the Big Red Hill, which is in reality the seated form of the Big Red Chicken.
2	2	"Lost and Found"	Steve Socki and Arne Wong	Eric Weiner	Karen Heathwood and Kelly Kennedy	August 14, 2000	102
Whilst playing hide-and-seek, Dora and Boots find Baby Blue Bird, a Spanish-speaking bluebird chick, who had fallen out of her nest, located in a little blue tree, and had become lost. Upon directions provided by Map, Dora and Boots journey past a banana tree (which they eat to sustain themselves) and through a cornfield (filled with angry red ants, which they avoid by following instructions from a talking scarecrow, who tells them to stick to the field's blue stone path after mistakenly scaring Baby Blue Bird on the property, which leads to not only her crying, but also Scarecrow crying as well) to eventually get the chick back to her family in their little blue tree home. Along their journey they have to; continually avoid Swiper who unsuccessfully attempts to steal items they have found on their journey, e.g. their food (bananas) and the chick's present to her mother (a purple flower); continually cheer-up the chick; and even re-find the chick after she gets lost again.
3	3	"Hic-Boom-Ohhh"	Steve Socki and Arne Wong	Valerie Walsh	Karen Heathwood and Kelly Kennedy	August 21, 2000	103
Dora and Boots follow the directions of Map to investigate the source of a mysterious sound ("Hic, Boom, Ohhh!") coming from Yellow Valley, that they heard whilst playing a game of "Loud and Quiet". They traverse a "noisy" river (with the assistance of Tico who rows over a blue rowboat, the only rowboat available with any life jackets and without any holes) and a "quiet" forest (using an acoustic horn from Backpack to awaken the sleeping Big Red Chicken who is blocking the only path, then also using a "tiptoe walk" to avoid waking Swiper who had unsuccessfully tried to steal their horn). Upon discovering that the source of the mysterious sound is Benny with the hiccups ("Hic!" - A hiccup, "Boom!" - Hitting the ground after falling down, "Ohh!" - An exclamation), they help cure Benny's hiccups by assisting him in loudly counting to 10.
4	4	"Beaches"	Gary Conrad	Eric Weiner	Karen Heathwood and Zac Moncrief	September 25, 2000	104
Dora gives Boots a swim ring floaty, after they decide to go swimming at the beach. Following the directions of Map, they travel through some yellow sand dunes via a yellow path (also helping Benny who is continually taking the wrong paths) and down a wooden boardwalk accessed by a rope ladder (missing planks, but repaired by Dora and Boots). During this journey, they repetitively encounter Swiper, preventing Swiper from trying to steal Tico's ice block (a friend they encounter along the way), and then recovering Boots' floaty after Swiper successfully steals, and then discards it. They reunite with Tico and Benny for a swim at the beach, patrolled by an octopus lifeguard (Val).
5	5	"We All Scream for Ice Cream" "Ice Cream"	Gary Conrad	Eric Weiner	Kelly Kennedy and Ty Schafrath	August 28, 2000	105
Dora and Boots just miss getting an ice cream from the ice cream truck (operated by Val the Octopus). After learning from Benny that the ice cream truck is headed to Coney Island (an island with giant ice cream cones on it), they follow Map's instruction to get there, i.e. going over Strawberry Mountain (getting a lift from Tico in his car) and going across the chocolate lake (using a chocolate boat, which they have to recover after Swiper successfully steals, and then disguards, it). On Coney Island, Isa informs them of the Ice Truck's location and the ice cream's cost (8 coins). Dora and Boots hail the ice cream (using an "Ice Cream for Ice Cream" cheer), and each purchases an ice cream using coins from Backpack.
6	6	"Choo Choo"	Gary Conrad	Eric Weiner	Bob Curtis and Tina Kugler	August 14, 2000	106
Dora and Boots visit a train station to see the trains (green, red, and blue) and encourage them to blow their whistles, discovering that the smaller blue train (Azul) doesn't have one. Upon learning that the first prize in the big train race (run by Val the Octopus) to the big yellow station is a big whistle, they assist Azul competing in the race. Following maps directions, they travel over a mountain (assisting Azul with the mountain's steep incline with encouragement cheers) and through a tunnel (assisting Azul with a flash light from Backpack, thus helping them see and almost avoid colliding with an on-coming grey train). The other two trains (green and red) tire from initially going to fast, allowing Azul to win the race. Swiper continually hampers their efforts by initially successfully stealing, and then discarding, a section of the blue line's train tracks (repaired by Dora and Boots after recovering the missing track pieces) and then unsuccessfully attempting to steal the race's whistle prize.
7	7	"Treasure Island"	Arne Wong	Eric Weiner	Kelly Kennedy and Ty Schafrath	September 18, 2000	107
Dora and Boots learn about a buried treasure chest, accessible with a blue key, from Pirate Parrot, who they locate during a game of "I spy". After finding the blue key and obtaining directions from Map, they traverse a long mire of "icky sticky mud" (by using the wooden plank, acting as a bridge, as directed to by the Pirate Parrot, the "lookout tree" guard) and across Crocodile Lake (using a boat sailed by Pirate Parrot and placating the crocodiles by singing "Grande, Grande Grande!"), to get to Treasure Island. Pirate Parrot introduces them to the Pirate Pig who shows them where to find and dig-up the buried treasure (gold coins, toys, chocolate cup cakes with pink icing and stickers), which they all share. Their journey is hampered by Swiper who twice attempts to steal the blue key (once successfully), and dispose of it.
8	8	"Three Little Piggies"	George Chialtas	Carin Greenberg Baker	Karen Heathwood and Zac Moncrief	September 4, 2000	108
Dora and Boots visit a pig pen to award each of the three pig occupants a blue ribbon (from Backpack) for being good. Whilst unsuccessfully attempting to steal the ribbons, Swiper leaves the gate open, allowing the pigs to escape. Following Map's directions, Dora and Boots find the 3 pigs, one in a hay stack in the hay field, one hiding behind some barrels in the barn, and the littlest one (Oinky) on an unstable branch of the apple tree (rescued by Dora using a net from Backpack). As they are too heavy to carry, Dora and Boots use a wagon to collect and return the pigs to their pen, before Swiper can steal their ribbons. The wagon causes various problems on their journey that need to be resolved, i.e. rolling away down a hill to almost run into a gate (a collision avoided by Tico opening it) and getting stuck in mud.
9	9	"Big River"	Gary Conrad	Leslie Valdes	Bob Curtis and Tina Kugler	October 9, 2000	109
Boots starts singing and dancing about his red boots, after Dora caught a pair of older boots whilst fishing in the river. One of Boots' red boots slips off, so he and Dora use a boat (damaged, but the holes are repaired by Dora and Boots) to follow Map's directions to retrieve it. They follow close behind the boot as it goes down the river, under a bascule bridge (down but opened by Tico), past some rapids (having to duck under overhanging branches), past the froggy rocks (which Dora and Boots have to row around to avoid crashing into them), and then onto a waterfall (avoided by taking a 'water-slide'-like little river running parallel to the obstacle). They retrieve the red boot from the river at the base of the waterfall, using a fishing rod from Backpack. Swiper hinders them in this journey, by initially unsuccessfully attempting to steal the boat after they fix it, and then finally unsuccessfully attempting to steal the retrieved boot once it is rescued from the river.
10	10	"Berry Hunt"	Arne Wong	Eric Weiner	Kelly Kennedy and Ty Schafrath	October 30, 2000	110
After Dora eats the five blue berries that her mother packed for her, Dora and Boots go hunting for more at Blueberry Hill. After obtaining a little blue pail to carry them (from Backpack) and directions to Blueberry Hill (from Map), they traverse the Icy Cold River (using a rowboat) and the Prickly Forest (using one of the overhanging vines to swing over), to get to Blueberry Hill (locked, but accessed with the Spanish password of "¡Abre!"). Whilst picking blueberries, they try to keep as quite as possible so as to avoid arousing Swiper, who lives in a foxhole on that hill. However, after picking 15 of them, they must fend off Swiper's attempt to steal the newly picked blueberries. They are then chased from the hill, and back over all the obstacles the way they came, by a hungry bear. They escape the bear when he is unable to swim all the way over the icy river to follow them, allowing Dora and Boots to celebrate and eat the blueberries they obtained.
11	11	"Wizzle Wishes"	George Chialtas	Chris Gifford	Karen Heathwood and Zac Moncrief	October 23, 2000	111
Dora reads Boots a story ("The Wizzle and the Four Wishes") from a book about wishes (yellow with a star emblem) from Backpack. In the story, a 'wizzle' child (Wizzle) found a bag with four star-shaped wishes. After using an initial wish (for ice cream), Wizzle has to chase one of the wishes, blown away by a gust of wind, out of the storybook. Whilst attempting to wish himself home to his storybook parents (mummy and daddy), yet another gust of wind blows his three remaining wishes away. After Map advises them that the wishes are headed to the wishing well, Dora, Boots, and Wizzle go past the Flowery Garden (they get trapped on top of a giant sunflower, made too big by Isa's use of one of the wishes, but escape by sliding down its stem), through the nutty forest (saving Tico from being hit by large falling nuts, by shouting a "¡Cuidado!" warning, after Tico used one of the wishes to conquer them all up), to get to the wishing well on top of a slippery muddy hill (with a broken stepping stone path up to the well, which they repaired by replacing the missing step stones). Dora catches the last remaining star and prevents Swiper from stealing it, thus enabling it to be used to wish Wizzle back home to his parents in the storybook.
12	12	"Grandma's House"	Arne Wong	Eric Weiner	Tina Kugler and Erik Wiese	November 13, 2000	112
Dora's mother (Mami) gives Dora a basket of treats (cookies, mangos, some rice pudding, and a picture that Dora had drawn of boots and herself.) to give to Dora's grandmother (Abuela), to make Abuela feel better whilst she is recovering from a cold. Following Map's instructions, Dora and Boots cross over the Bumpy Bridge (using a fishing pool from Backpack to retrieve the basket when it falls into the ravine below as the bridge spans) and across Turtle River by stepping on some of the shells of the Spanish-speaking turtle inhabitants (having to initially find the basket when they place it on a turtle's back and it is carried away) to get to Grandma's house. During their journey, they must continually avoid Swiper who makes several unsuccessful attempts to steal the basket.
13	13	"Surprise"	George Chialtas	Eric Weiner	Kelly Kennedy and Ty Schafrath	November 6, 2000	113
Following Map's directions, Dora and Boots journey back to Dora's house for Boots' birthday party, with a cake obtained from Backpack (a banana cake with banana icing and an image of Boots' face on top, in a square yellow cake box). They must overcome several challenges along the way. They go up some stairs, avoiding both a stampede of chickens and a Spanish-speaking horse ("Caballito"). They recover the cake after Swiper steals it and then discards it in the jungle. They answer the Grump Old Trolls' riddle (singing the Spanish "Happy Birthday" song, "Feliz Cumpleaños"), in order to cross the Troll Bridge. After Dora's Mami (Mrs. Marquez) greets them upon their arrival, Dora and Boots' friends (Tico, Isa, and Benny) all surprise Boots with a "surprise jump". They all celebrate Boot's birthday with balloons, goody bags, a piñata, birthday presents, party games, and Boots' cake. Boots blows out the cake's banana-shaped candle and wishes that he and Dora could play together every day forever and ever.
14	14	"Sticky Tape"	George Chialtas	Chris Gifford	Karen Heathwood and Zac Moncrief	November 27, 2000	114
Upon witnessing Benny's distress at a hole in his hot-air balloon that is causing it to descend towards Crocodile Lake, Dora obtains some stick tape from Backpack and, with Boots, she heads to the lake, following Map's directions. Dora and Boots have to continually stop Swiper's attempts to steal the sticky tape, at one point even having to recover the sticky tape from the jungle after it is stolen and discarded. On their journey, they encounter numerous situations that require the stick tape's use, i.e. repairing Backpack's broken strap, patching up five holes in Tico's sailboat's sail (allowing them to cross the Windy River), sticking the Blue Bird family's nest onto a tree (thus avoiding it being blown off), wrapping-up their feet to prevent them slipping (when climbing over Slippery Rock), and repairing the rope ladder on Benny's hot air balloon as they climb up it. They patch the hole in Benny's balloon, thus preventing it from crashing into the lake.
15	15	"Bouncing Ball"	George Chialtas	Eric Weiner	John Fountain and Tina Kugler	December 4, 2000	115
Using money from Backpack (five coins), Dora assists Boots (seven coins) in buying a "supper blue bouncy bouncy ball" (12 coins) from a toy store run by Val the Octopus. After Boots bounces it too hard, the ball bounces near a volcano. To try and retrieve the ball before an eruption occurs, they follow Maps' directions to the volcano. Their journey involves traversing some mucky mud (utilizing some rocks in the mud as stepping stones to jump like a frog over the mud), going over the Troll Bridge (by answering the Grumpy Old Troll's riddle), and finally hitching a lift in Tico's car. During the journey, they continually have to avoid Swiper's attempts to steal, and then dispose of, their possessions. Upon their arrival at the volcano and their retrieval of the ball, the volcano erupts with numerous similar bouncy balls.
16	16	"Bugga Bugga"	Gary Conrad	Eric Weiner	Karen Heathwood and Zac Moncrief	April 30, 2001	117
Dora and Boots are on a bug hunt, using her bug book and a magnifying glass from Backpack. They encounter a bug ("Mami Bugga Bugga") struggling to carry a cookie on its back to the bug's home ("the Big Blue Bush") to feed her babies. Following Map's directions there, they go through the Flowery Garden tended by Isa (where they rescue the bug from a "bug trapper" flower) and through a spider web (using the green circle path to avoid the spiders). On their journey, they have to recover the cookie, after Swiper steals and disregards it, and then Bugga Bugga, when the bug is blown away in a big wind. Once at the Big Blue Bush, Mami Bugga Bugga divides the cookie equally to feed her 10 Bugga Bugga babies.
17	17	"Fish Out of Water"	George Chialtas	Eric Weiner	Tina Kugler and Dominic Orlando	May 1, 2001	118
At the beach, whilst looking at seashells, Dora and Boots discover a fish ("Baby Red Fish"). Baby Red Fish was trapped in a small pond after having been carried there by a big wave whilst straying from his home, a rock at the bottom of the ocean ("Red Rock"). Using Map for directions, and a pail from Backpack, they carry the fish through a colony of big clams (using the word "Abre" when trapped in a clam's mouths), over a large sandcastle wall (ascending it by climbing like a crab up a net ladder and sliding down the other side using a sand slide), and past Swiper (hidden behind an umbrella, who is stopped from attempting to steal the pail). Upon reaching the seashore and releasing the fish, Dora and Boots get a lift in Val the Octopus' submarine in order to follow Baby Red Fish home. On the underwater leg of their journey, they save Baby Red Fish from being swallowed whole by a bigger fish ("Big Blue Fish"), by using the command 'abre' to make the bigger fish open its mouth. Both fish, when subsequently swallowed whole by an ever bigger yellow fish, have to save themselves in a similar manner as before. Upon finding the Red Rock, Baby Red Fish finds her family, who are grateful for their child's rescue.
18	18	"Little Star"	Ken Kessel	Eric Weiner	Kelly Kennedy and Ty Schafrath	May 21, 2001	119
Whilst performing her regular wishing upon the first night's star (Little Star) with a telescope from Backpack, Dora and Boots observer Little Star's collision with a comet and its resultant fall to earth. They find the fallen star, comfort it, and pledge to return it back home, in the night sky with the moon. Following Maps directions, Dora and Boots go over the troll bridge (by solving the Grumpy Old Troll's riddle of counting stars), past Tico's tree (helping Tico retrieve Little Star after Swiper steals, and then discards, it in Tico's tree), and up the Tall Mountain. On the mountain peak, they throw little star up to the moon, just in time for it to be the first star of the night for everyone to make a wish upon.
18	18	"El Coquí"	Bob Curtis	Leslie Valdes	Karen Heathwood and Zac Moncrief	May 2, 2001	121
Dora and Boots find a lost coquí frog, who isn't able to sing until he's at his island home. They decide to return the Coquí to his island so he can sing.
19	19	"The Chocolate Tree"	George Chialtas	Eric Weiner	Kelly Kennedy and Ty Schafrath	May 3, 2001	122
Dora and Boots try to find the Chocolate Tree and a special gift for Abuela.
20	20	"To The Treehouse"	Ken Kessel	Eric Weiner	Tina Kugler and Zac Moncrief	May 4, 2001	125
Dora and Boots help their friends get to the treehouse for a big thank-you party.
22	22	"Call Me Mr. Riddles"	Ken Kessel	Valerie Walsh	Kelly Kennedy and Ty Schafrath	September 24, 2001	126
Boots is confident he can solve the silliest riddle when he and Dora are chosen to complete in a riddle contest at the Tallest Mountain.
23	23	"Te Amo"	George Chialtas	Eric Weiner	Dominic Orlando	October 1, 2001	123
An evil magician named El Mago has turned the royal couple, King Popo and Queen Maria into mountains. Now, Dora and Boots must set off to break the spell before El Mago stops them.
24	24	"Pablo's Flute"	Bob Curtis	Eric Weiner	Karen Heathwood and Eric Sanford	October 15, 2001	124
Dora and Boots set off to Pablo's mountain to return a colorful flute to Pablo, himself, and reverse a devastating drought on his grandpa's farm.
25	25	"Dora Saves the Prince"	George Chialtas	Valerie Walsh	Tina Kugler and Dominic Orlando	October 29, 2001	120
Upon reading a storybook ("The Prince and the Witch") from Backpack, about a prince (Prince Ramon) who is imprisoned in a small room inside a high tower after he trespasses into the Witch's Forest in an attempt to retrieve a ball he accidentally kicked in there, Dora and Boots both jump into the storybook to save the prince. Following Maps' directions, they go through the Big Gate (opened with the secret password of "Abre"), through the Witch's Forest (collecting the Prince's lost ball and avoiding Swiper's attempts to steal it), across Crocodile Lake (by asking the crocodiles to close their mouths so that they can jump over them), and on to the High Tower (using the secrete password of "Abre" to open the tower door, assembling the 12 steps up to the door of the Prince's cell, and again opening the cell door with the secrete password of "Abre"). Throughout their journey, they have to evade the witch who is in close pursuit. They finally defeat the witch by traping her in the Prince's magic ball, only releasing her when she promises to be good.

=== Season 2 (2002–03) ===
No. overall	No. in season	Title	Animation direction by	Written by	Storyboard by	Original release date	Prod. code	K2–11 viewers (in millions)
26	1	"Lost Squeaky"	George Chialtas	Chris Gifford	Alex Que and Mike Sosnowski	February 13, 2002	205	N/A
Boots loses his new squeaky bath toy, so he and Dora head to the Gooey Geyser to rescue him.
27	2	"The Missing Piece"	George Chialtas and Sherie Pollack	Eric Weiner	Dominic Orlando and Eric Sanford	February 18, 2002	204	N/A
A Jigsaw puzzle wizard named El Encantador (Spanish for "the wizard") (Ricardo Montalbán) is missing a piece: his magic wand. It's up to Dora and Boots to help him find it so he can do his magic.
28	3	"Backpack"	George Chialtas	Eric Weiner	Kelly Kennedy and Ty Schafrath	March 4, 2002	116	N/A
This episode is primarily set in the past, as Dora reminisces about the time she first got Backpack. Mami and Papi gave Dora Backpack, including Map, to assist her in returning her 8 library books from home. Following Maps' directions, they crossed over the troll bridge (having answered the Grumpy Old Trolls' riddle and then cut through his net obstacle) and climbed over the Big Rock, in order to get to the library. From Backpack, Dora pulls out numerous items to assist them on their journey, including a soft bandage to fix boots' arm injury ("boo boo"), an umbrella to protect them from the rain, scissors to cut through the Grumpy Old Trolls' net, a rope to rescue Boots from quicksand and then climb over the Big Rock, and sicky tape to mend the rope. At one point on their journey, Swiper steals, and then discards, Backpack, forcing Dora and Boots to locate Backpack by its calls, i.e. "Backpack!". Dora and Boots eventually made it to the library as it was closing, encouraging the library door not to close before they got in. The librarian, Val the Octopus, then allowed them to return their books 'on time'.
29	4	"The Big Storm"	George Chialtas	Eric Weiner	Kelly Kennedy and Kuni Tomita	March 5, 2002	201	N/A
Dora and Boots must warn their forest friends on their way home that storm cloud is heading their way. Along the way, they stop the storm cloud by singing "Rain, Rain, Go Away".
30	5	"The Magic Stick"	George Chialtas	Valerie Walsh	Kelly Kennedy and Kuni Tomita	March 12, 2002	203	N/A
Dora and Boots find a magic stick and venture to Highest Hill to reveal its magic power.
31	6	"Rojo, the Fire Truck"	Sherie Pollack	Eric Weiner	Edwin Alcala and Enrico Santana	March 18, 2002	206	N/A
Rojo, the fire truck invites Dora and Boots to accomplish his first rescue mission: saving a kitten stuck in a big tree.
32	7	"El Día de las Madres (Mother's Day)"	Sherie Pollack	Leslie Valdes	Dominic Orlando and Eric Sanford	May 8, 2002	208	N/A
Dora and Boots have to gather ingredients for Mami to bake her special Mother's Day cake: 10 bananas, 6 nuts, and 1 piece of chocolate.
33	8	"The Golden Explorers"	George Chialtas	Eric Weiner	Alex Que and Mike Sosnowski	September 16, 2002	209	N/A
Dora, Boots, Isa, Benny, and Tico form a soccer team called the Golden Explorers and play against the big dinosaurs.
34	9	"Doctor Dora"	Sherie Pollack	Valerie Walsh	Edwin Alcala and Enrico Santana	September 17, 2002	211	N/A
Dora and Boots are playing doctor, where they help some of their friends with different health issues, while giving them lollipops and stickers. Most importantly, they must help Benny the Bull cure his allergies at his barn.
35	10	"Pinto, the Pony Express"	Sherie Pollack	Ashley Mendoza	Dominic Orlando and Eric Sanford	September 18, 2002	212	N/A
Cowgirl Dora and Cowboy Boots ride their trusty friend Pinto the pony across the wild west to deliver Cowboy Cookies to Benny at his barn. However, they must prevent Swiper from swiping them.
36	11	"The Big Piñata"	Sherie Pollack	Leslie Valdes	Edwin Alcala and Enrico Santana	September 19, 2002	214	N/A
Dora and Boots need to earn 10 yellow tickets at the carnival to win the big prize: a big piñata with special prizes inside.
37	12	"The Happy Old Troll"	George Chialtas	Chris Gifford	Kelly Kennedy and Kuni Tomita	September 20, 2002	215	N/A
Nothing makes the Grumpy Old Troll happy, except for three things: a purple petunia flower, fireworks, and flying horses. Dora and Boots want to find all those things that make him happy so he can perform a happy dance.
38	13	"A Letter for Swiper"	George Chialtas	Eric Weiner	Dominic Orlando and Eric Sanford	October 14, 2002	217	N/A
Dora and Boots deliver a letter to Swiper when the Special Delivery Bird accidentally breaks her glasses. Along the way, they deliver letters to Tico, Isa and Benny that contain different surprises.
39	14	"Click!"	George Chialtas	Eric Weiner	Alex Que and Mike Sosnowski	November 5, 2002	221	N/A
Dora and Boots enter a photo contest that requires them to take pictures of wild animals to win.
40	15	"¡Rápído, Tico! (Faster, Tico!)"	George Chialtas	Eric Weiner	Dominic Orlando and Eric Sanford	November 18, 2002 (Note: This episode was first released in Christmas VHS on September 24, 2002.)	202	N/A
Boots is excited for a toy fire truck to come in the mail. When the package arrives, the box is empty. It turns out it's lost and is now sitting on top of the Snowy Mountain, so he, Dora and Tico have to retrieve it before Swiper does.
41	16	"A Present for Santa"	George Chialtas	Chris Gifford	Kelly Kennedy and Kuni Tomita	December 11, 2002 (Note: This episode was first released in Christmas VHS and Nick Jr. Holiday DVD on September 24, 2002.)	210	N/A
Today is Christmas Eve, and Dora and Boots want to go to the North Pole to deliver a gift to Santa Claus.
42	17	"Super Map"	Sherie Pollack	Valerie Walsh	Alex Que and Mike Sosnowski	January 20, 2003	216	N/A
Map finds a magic cape that gives him superpowers on the Tallest Mountain. Now as Super Map, he must lead Dora and Boots back home so Mami and Papi can show them a super surprise.
43	18	"Lost Map"	George Chialtas	Eric Weiner	Kelly Kennedy and Kuni Tomita	January 20, 2003	207	N/A
After a silly bird mistakes Map as a stick for his nest on the Tallest Mountain, Dora and Boots must make their own map and go up there to rescue their friend.
44	19	"Dora, La Música"	George Chialtas	Leslie Valdes	Kelly Kennedy and Kuni Tomita	January 27, 2003 (Note: This episode was first release in Move to the Music VHS on November 5, 2002.)	219	N/A
Dora, Boots and their friends lead a parade to free musical instruments that were locked up in the music box by Señor Shush, who doesn't allow music or noise in his town.
45	20	"The Lost City"	Sherie Pollack	Chris Gifford	Alex Que and Jose Silverio	February 24, 2003	307	3.13
Dora and Boots travel to Lost City, where they hope to find Osito the bear, as well as some of their friends' favorite things. Note: This episode marks the debut of the Explorer Stars.
46	21	"Egg Hunt"	Sherie Pollack	Eric Weiner	Edwin Alcala and Enrico Santana	April 20, 2003	222	2.16
Today is Easter, and Dora and Boots hunt for cascarónes – Easter eggs with confetti and prizes inside.
47	22	"To the Monkey Bars"	Sherie Pollack	Eric Weiner	Edwin Alcala and Enrico Santana	April 28, 2003	218	N/A
Dora has a secret: she tried and tried, but never conquered the monkey bars. If she wants to retry it, she and Boots need to race over to Play Park.
48	23	"Hide and Go Seek"	Sherie Pollack	Ashley Mendoza	Dominic Orlando and Eric Sanford	May 5, 2003	220	N/A
Viewers play hide-and-go-seek with Dora and her friends to win the big trophy.
49	24	"School Pet"	Sherie Pollack	Christine Ricci	Dominic Orlando and Eric Sanford	May 12, 2003	224	N/A
Boots is visiting Dora at school, when they notice that Mimo, the class pet hamster, is missing from his cage! Dora and Boots have to go rescue him.
50	25	"Quack! Quack!"	George Chialtas	Denise Dorn	Karen Heathwood and Kuni Tomita	May 19, 2003	226	N/A
Dora and Boots need to return a baby duckling to its family at the duck pond.
51	26	"León, the Circus Lion"	George Chialtas	Eric Weiner	Alex Que and Mike Sosnowski	July 14, 2003	213	1.86
Dora and Boots meet León, a lion who has a talent of juggling, tiperope walking, and unicycling, and help him join the circus.

=== Season 3 (2003–04) ===
No. overall	No. in season	Title	Animation direction by	Written by	Storyboard by	Original release date	Prod. code	K2–11 viewers (in millions)
52	1	"Star Catcher"	George Chialtas and Sherie Pollack	Eric Weiner	Carol Datuin, Alex Que, Jose Silverio, Kuni Tomita, and Ysty Veluz	October 6, 2003	401	N/A
Dora receives a Star Pocket from her Abuela and learns how to catch stars. But Swiper swipes it, and attaches it to a balloon, where a star-catching prince eventually gets ahold of it.
53	2	"Stuck Truck"	George Chialtas	Eric Weiner	Dominic Orlando and Eric Sanford	October 8, 2003	302	N/A
Boots calls his truck friends for a rescue mission to free the ice cream truck from a ditch.
54	3	"Roberto the Robot"	George Chialtas	Chris Gifford	Dominic Orlando and Eric Sanford	October 9, 2003	304	N/A
Dora and Boots help a lost robot named Roberto get to his grandpa's house.
55	4	"¡Por Favor!"	George Chialtas	Valerie Walsh	Dominic Orlando and Eric Sanford	October 10, 2003	310	N/A
Dora and Boots set off to tell a young kinkajou the magic words to fulfill his destiny of being king.
56	5	"Rescue, Rescue, Rescue!"	Sherie Pollack	Eric Weiner	Dominic Orlando and Eric Sanford	October 13, 2003	317	N/A
Dora and Boots need to rescue 3 friends: Baby Jaguar, Isa, and Benny. However, Boots, Baby Jaguar and Isa freak out when they see a dangerous situation, so Dora teaches them to take deep breaths to calm down. Then they make a plan on how to rescue their friends.
57	6	"Save the Puppies!"	Sherie Pollack	Christine Ricci	Alex Que and Jose Silverio	October 14, 2003	309	N/A
Dora and Boots jump into a handheld video game console to save 100 puppies from being locked up in cages by a mean dog catcher.
58	7	"The Big Potato"	Sherie Pollack	Valerie Walsh	Alex Que and Jose Silverio	October 15, 2003	305	N/A
Benny accidentally turns himself into a potato, using a magic wand that belongs to a friendly young wizard. Now Dora, Boots, and Benny must get to the wizard's castle to return his wand and reverse the spell.
59	8	"What Happens Next?"	George Chialtas	Valerie Walsh	Alex Que and Jose Silverio	October 16, 2003	316	N/A
After reading the story of The Three Little Pigs, Dora, Boots, and King Juan el Bobo (Cheech Marin) wonder what happens after the end. So they use their imaginations to continue the story, setting off on an adventure in their minds.
60	9	"The Fix-It Machine"	Sherie Pollack	Eric Weiner	Alex Que and Jose Silverio	October 17, 2003	320	N/A
Boots has a hole in his boot, so Dora decides to take him to get it fixed. Along the way, they run into their friends with other items that have holes in them, so they take them along.
61	10	"Meet Diego!"	George Chialtas	Eric Weiner	Dominic Orlando and Eric Sanford	October 20, 2003 (Note: This episode was first released in Meet Diego VHS/DVD on October 7, 2003.)	308	N/A
Dora introduces her cousin, Diego, to Boots and the viewers for the first time. For their first mission together, Dora, Boots, and Diego must rescue a baby jaguar from a waterfall. Note: This episode marks the debut of Diego, who would later get a spin-off series of his own: Go, Diego, Go!
62	11	"Baby Dino"	George Chialtas and Sherie Pollack	Eric Weiner	Jim Schumann and Mike Sosnowski	October 22, 2003	311	N/A
Dora, Boots, and Diego bring a baby apatosaurus dinosaur back home with his mother at Dino Island.
63	12	"Baseball Boots"	Sherie Pollack	Chris Gifford	Dominic Orlando and Eric Sanford	October 23, 2003	321	N/A
Boots wants to have his first big hit, so he and Dora decide to go to the baseball stadium to see if he can do it.
64	13	"Boots' Special Day"	George Chialtas	Chris Gifford	Alex Que, Jim Schumann, Jose Silverio, and Mike Sosnowski	October 24, 2003	312	2.18
Today is Boots' special day and he get to do anything he wants, like lead a big drum parade and visit Diego's animal rescue center. But most importantly, Boots wants to visit his dad at an amusement park and ride on a big roller coaster.
65	14	"Boo!"	Sherie Pollack	Eric Weiner	Jim Schumann and Mike Sosnowski	October 29, 2003	315	N/A
On Halloween night, Dora is wearing a cat costume while Boots is dressed in a hybrid between a firefighter and a chicken. They then meet a young purple monster named Little Monster. Meanwhile, they hear chimes coming from the clock tower. When the arrow points to 12, that means all monsters will arrive at the Monster House for the Halloween party. Following directions from Map, Dora and Boots help Little Monster navigate through a pumpkin patch (where they encounter Scarecrow, who instructs them to select one of the three paths with the correct Jack-O-Lantern bucket being shown, which depicts a happy face) and the Good Witch's Forest (where they access through the gate using the word "Abre!" and grant permission from the Good Witch, who allows them to ride a flying broomstick and avoid some obstacles) in order to get to the Monster House on time before the party starts. The three catch stars along the way, including Disco Star. Also, they see some friends dressed in Halloween costumes and avoid Swiper, who unsuccessfully steals their Halloween candy.
66	15	"Dora Saves the Game"	George Chialtas	Valerie Walsh	Carol Datuin and Ysty Veluz	November 11, 2003	314	2.06
Dora's cousin Daisy is playing a soccer game. But when Daisy's team, the Yellow Tigres, has one player less, Daisy counts on Dora to play on her team, so she, Boots, and Diego head to the soccer stadium to help Daisy.
67	16	"The Super Silly Fiesta"	George Chialtas	Valerie Walsh	Jim Schumann and Mike Sosnowski	April 12, 2004	319	N/A
Today, the Big Red Chicken is hosting a Super Silly Fiesta. But the cake is missing!
68	17	"Boots' Cuddly Dinosaur"	Sherie Pollack	Chris Gifford	Carol Datuin and Ysty Veluz	April 19, 2004	318	N/A
Boots lost his cuddly dinosaur at Play Park, so he, Dora, and Diego need to go there to find it in time for a sleepover at Dora's house before sunset.
69	18	"Job Day"	George Chialtas	Valerie Walsh and Alix Landry-Iverson	Jim Schumann and Mike Sosnowski	April 20, 2004	324	N/A
Dora, Boots, and Diego get to experience many jobs to help them figure out what they want to be when they grow up.
70	19	"Louder!"	Sherie Pollack	Eric Weiner	Jose Silverio and Kuni Tomita	April 21, 2004	303	N/A
Dora and Boots meet Red Rooster and help soothe his throat. Together, they set off to the Highest Hill to wake up the sun.
71	20	"ABC Animals"	Sherie Pollack	Christine Ricci	Dominic Orlando and Eric Sanford	April 22, 2004	323	N/A
Dora and Boots jump into a giant alphabet book and see that all of the animals from A-Z are gone except for Armadillo.
72	21	"Whose Birthday is It?"	Sherie Pollack	Chris Gifford	Alex Que and Mike Sosnowski	June 14, 2004 (Note: This episode was first released in Whose Birthday is It? Kideo VHS/DVD on June 6, 2003.)	225	1.84
Dora and Boots have to figure out whose birthday it is when they see a mysterious Birthday Balloon fly by on its way to Play Park. They come along with all of their friends and follow it there to learn who's having the birthday party.

=== Season 4 (2004–08) ===
No. overall	No. in season	Title	Animation direction by (Note: The episodes Dora's Dance to the Rescue, Dora's World Adventure and Dora Saves the Mermaids credit the animation director as an episodic director.)	Written by	Storyboard by	Original release date	Prod. code	Viewers (millions)
73	1	"Dora's Fairytale Adventure"	George Chialtas and Sherie Pollack	Eric Weiner	Carol Datuin, Miyuki Hoshikawa, Dominic Orlando, Alex Que, Jose Silverio, Janice Tolentino, Arthur Valencia, and Ysty Veluz	September 24, 2004	421–422 (Note: Also listed under the syndication number #998.)	N/A
Dora and Boots are playing in Fairytale Land, a magical place where fairy tale characters live. But when an evil witch (Chita Rivera) casts a spell on Boots, he falls into a deep sleep and turns into Sleeping Boots. The only way to break the spell is for Sleeping Boots to get a hug from a true princess. It's up to Dora to become a true princess and save Boots before it's too late. Note: This is the 1st double-length episode to air on television. “Dora’s Pirate Adventure” was the first to be both produced and released on DVD, but it premiered on television the next year.
74	2	"Daisy, La Quinceañera"	Sherie Pollack	Valerie Walsh	Alex Que and Jose Sliverio	October 1, 2004	406	1.69 (2-11) (Note: This represents the number of people aged 2-11 who watched the episode on premiere.)
Dora, Boots, Diego, and Baby Jaguar have to bring Daisy's birthday crown and shoes for her quinceañera (15th birthday), but the quest isn't built for just one or two people, because they get help along the way.
75	3	"Dora's Pirate Adventure"	George Chialtas and Sherie Pollack	Chris Gifford	Carol Datuin, Alex Que, Jose Silverio, and Ysty Veluz	January 17, 2005 (Note: This episode was first released on Pirate Adventure VHS/DVD on January 27, 2004.)	325–326 (Note: Also listed under the syndication number #999.)	N/A
Dora and her friends are about to put on a play about pirates for an audience of friends and relatives. But when the Pirate Pig and his Pirate Piggies steal the treasure chest with costumes inside, the group sets out to cross what's literally the Seven Seas and pass under the Singing Bridge to make their way to Treasure Island and get the costumes back in time for the show. Note: This is the 2nd double-length episode to air on television, but the first one both produced and released on DVD.
76	4	"Big Sister Dora"	Sherie Pollack	Valerie Walsh	Carol Datuin, Jose Silverio, and Ysty Veluz	March 21, 2005	411	2.5
Dora and Boots are in a rush to get to Dora's house after learning that Mami is pregnant.
77	5	"Super Babies"	Sherie Pollack	Leslie Valdes	Miyuki Hoshikawa and Arthur Valencia	March 28, 2005	413	N/A
Dora tells her baby brother and sister a story where they are Super Babies who try to get their banana baby food back from Swiper.
78	6	"Catch the Babies"	George Chialtas	Christine Ricci	Carol Datuin and Ysty Veluz	April 4, 2005	419	N/A
Dora tells a true but silly story to her family and friends about the time she and her entire family caught her baby siblings. In her story, her baby siblings are aboard a runaway stroller headed towards the Gooey Geyser. This wakes Dora's family up in a flash and they must quickly prevent the babies from rolling into it.
79	7	"Dora's Got a Puppy"	Sherie Pollack	Chris Gifford	Miyuki Hoshikawa, Enrico Santana, and Arthur Valencia	May 16, 2005	410	N/A
Dora and Boots need to bring a home present that Abuela gave for Perrito the puppy. But they have to hurry because Swiper has new swiping tricks up his sleeves to help him swipe it.
80	8	"Dora and Diego to the Rescue!"	Sherie Pollack	Valerie Walsh	Miyuki Hoshikawa, Dominic Orlando, Jose Silverio, and Janice Tolentino	September 6, 2005	420	N/A
When Boots is being blown away by his kite and strong wind, Dora and Diego must race to Polar Bear Mountain to rescue him. Note: Jake T. Austin is the voice of Diego in this episode.
81	9	"A Crown for King Juan el Bobo"	George Chialtas	Eric Weiner	Alex Que, Jose Silverio, and Arthur Valencia	October 3, 2005	409	N/A
Dora and Boots help silly and forgetful King Juan el Bobo (Cheech Marin) find his misplaced crown in time for his mother's birthday party.
82	10	"Dora Had a Little Lamb"	Sherie Pollack	Eric Weiner	Jose Silverio and Kuni Tomita	October 4, 2005 (Note: This episode was first released on Rhymes and Riddles VHS/DVD on August 26, 2003.).	301	N/A
Dora and Boots jump into a book of nursery rhymes to return a lost little lamb to her owner, Mary.
83	11	"The Mixed-Up Seasons"	Sherie Pollack	Christine Ricci	Carol Datuin and Ysty Veluz	October 5, 2005	415	N/A
When a snowman shows up on the beach in the middle of summer, Dora and Boots need to help him and other figures go back to their respective season.
84	12	"Best Friends"	George Chialtas	Eric Weiner	Carol Datuin and Ysty Veluz	October 6, 2005	322	N/A
Dora and Boots plan to meet each other at Rainbow Rock to have a Best Friend's Day picnic.
85	13	"Journey to the Purple Planet"	George Chialtas	Eric Weiner	Dominic Orlando and Eric Sanford	October 28, 2005	306	N/A
Dora and Boots blast off into outer space to return 5 aliens named Flinky, Inky, Plinky, Dinky, and Al to the Purple Planet.
86	14	"Dora's Dance to the Rescue"	George Chialtas, Henry Madden, and Sherie Pollack	Eric Weiner	Anna Burns, Carol Datuin, Enrico Santana, Jose Silverio, Janice Tolentino, Kuni Tomita, and Ysty Veluz	November 11, 2005 (Note: This episode was first released in Dance to the Rescue VHS/DVD on October 11, 2005.)	423–424 (Note: Also listed under the syndication number #997.)	N/A
In a story Dora tells, Swiper gets tricked by a mean dance-loving elf, and is subsequently trapped in a magic bottle. Dora and Boots must win a dance competition at King Juan el Bobo's castle, in which the prize is one big wish, and they have to wish Swiper free from the bottle.
87	15	"To the South Pole"	Sherie Pollack	Ashley Mendoza	Dominic Orlando and Eric Sanford	January 16, 2006	313	1.82 (2-11)
Dora, Boots, and Diego help a lost baby penguin get back to its family at the South Pole.
88	16	"Dora's First Trip"	George Chialtas and Sherie Pollack	Eric Weiner	Alex Que and Jose Silverio	April 7, 2006	402	N/A
Dora recalls when she first met Boots and the rest of her animal friends, as well as her first exploration: returning the instruments to the Fiesta Trio so they can perform a song for the queen bee, who doesn't like waiting.
89	17	"Baby Jaguar's Roar"	George Chialtas	Leslie Valdes	Miyuki Hoshikawa, Jim Schumann, and Janice Tolentino	June 5, 2006	408	N/A
Dora, Boots, and Diego help rescue Baby Jaguar's friend, Baby Bear, who is stuck on top of the Big Mountain.
90	18	"Boots to the Rescue"	George Chialtas	Eric Weiner	Jim Schumann and Janice Tolentino	November 6, 2006	412	N/A
Dora forgets her music homework on the way to school, so Boots must go there and return it to her before she gets in trouble.
91	19	"Dora's World Adventure!"	George Chialtas, Matt Engstrom, Allan Jacobsen, and Henry Madden	Valerie Walsh	Carol Datuin, Matt Engstrom, Allen Jacobsen, Maureen Mascarina, Alex Que, Enrico Santana, Jose Silverio, Janice Tolentino, and Arthur Valencia	November 19, 2006 (Note: This episode was first released in World Adventure! VHS/DVD on October 10, 2006.)	425–426 (Note: Also listed under the syndication number #996.)	N/A
Dora and her friends are excited to celebrate Friendship Day. However, Swiper has swiped all of the friendship bracelets from around the world, and the bracelets won't glow unless everyone from each country wears them. When Swiper tries to return the bracelets, his helicopter breaks down. So Dora offers to help Swiper give them back. Along the way, they meet some of Dora's friends in France, Tanzania, Russia, and China. Note: This is the 4th double-length episode.
92	20	"Star Mountain"	Sherie Pollack	Chris Gifford	Carol Datuin and Ysty Veluz	March 12, 2007 (Note: This episode was first released in Catch the Stars VHS/DVD on January 11, 2005.)	403	N/A
Swiper swiped and flung Dora's favorite necklace to the top of Star Mountain, so Dora and Boots need to go there to get it back.
93	21	"Baby Crab"	George Chialtas and Henry Madden	Leslie Valdes	Dominic Orlando, Enrico Santana, and Arthur Valencia	June 25, 2007	417	N/A
Dora and Boots save a baby crab that got caught in a net and return him to Crab Island so he can give his mother a necklace made out of shells that he made for her as a present.
94	22	"La Maestra De Música"	Sherie Pollack	Leslie Valdes	Carol Datuin, Jose Silverio, Kuni Tomita, and Ysty Veluz	July 23, 2007 (Note: This episode was first released in Musical School Days DVD on February 13, 2007.)	405	N/A
Dora, Boots, and Diego help their music teacher get to school for a sing-along, after her bicycle chain breaks. Note: The English translation for this episode's title is "The Music Teacher".
95	23	"Dora Saves the Mermaids!"	George Chialtas, Allan Jacobsen, and Henry Lenardin-Madden	Valerie Walsh	Butch Datuin, Carol Datuin, Enrico Santana, Jose Silverio, Arthur Valencia, and Ysty Veluz	November 5, 2007 (Note: This episode was released in Dora Saves the Mermaids DVD on September 25, 2007.)	517–518 (Note: Also listed under the syndication number #995.)	3.5
Dora and Boots set out to help Mariana the mermaid recover a magic crown to wish the Mermaid Kingdom to be clean again, and to stop an evil octopus from dumping garbage all over it. Note: In production order, this is the final episode where Kathleen Herles voices Dora, Harrison Chad voices Boots, and the rest of the original cast to act before their departure, except for the voices of Map, Swiper, the Fiesta Trio, and for at least the next season, Diego.
96	24	"Super Spies"	George Chialtas	Valerie Walsh	Kelly Kennedy and Kuni Tomita	December 3, 2007	223	N/A
Fellow Super Spy, Señor Tucán, assigns Dora and Boots some spy gadgets (Super Spy ID Cards, a Spy Phone, Spy Glasses, a Spy Rope, Rocket Sneakers and a Swiper Detector, which they store in agent Backpack) and a mission to complete (written in invisible ink, but revealed by their Spy Pen) to warn Isa that Swiper is going to steal her special cupcakes. Super Spy Dora and Boots follow Agent Maps' directions to get to Isa, using the Swiper detector to avoid Swiper. They travel through a garden hedge using the Hidden Door (located with the Spy Glasses), only accessible using the password of "¡Abre!". After escaping being trapped in a hole (with their Rocket Boots, as the sides are too slippery to climb), they travel through the Secret Jungle (getting a lift in Tico's Boat Car, after calling him on the Spy Phone, which enables them to get passed the local spiders and snakes, and even over a pond), again only accessible via a hidden door using the secret password of "¡Abre!". They swing down a cliff using the Spy Rope (as a zip line attached to the cliff's big tree), arriving at the Flowery Garden in time to stop Swiper from stealing Isa's special cupcakes. Super Spy Señor Tucán arrives and informs them that they have completed their mission.
97	25	"The Shy Rainbow"	George Chialtas	Eric Weiner	Miyuki Hoshikawa and Janice Tolentino	February 22, 2008 (Note: This episode was first released in Shy Rainbow DVD on April 3, 2007.)	416	N/A
Dora and Boots help a shy rainbow named Arco Iris shine in the sky for the first time.
98	26	"Super Spies 2: The Swiping Machine"	George Chialtas and Sherie Pollack	Valerie Walsh	Alex Que and Jose Silverio	March 14, 2008 (Note: This episode was first released on Undercover Dora DVD on January 15, 2008.)	404	N/A
Dora, Boots, and Diego are on a secret mission to stop Swiper and his new invention from swiping Tico's birthday presents.
99	27	"We're a Team!"	George Chialtas	Chris Gifford	Jose Silverio and Alex Que	August 5, 2008 (Note: This episode was first released on We're a Team! VHS/DVD on August 15, 2006.)	414	N/A
Dora and her friends form a team to win the Super Adventure Race.

=== Season 5 (2008–10) ===
Caitlin Sanchez replaces Kathleen Herles as the voice of Dora.

No. overall	No. in season	Title	Directed by	Written by	Storyboard by	Original release date	Prod. code	Viewers (millions)
100	1	"The Backpack Parade"	George Chialtas	Rosemary Contreras	Carol Delmindo Datuin, Enrico Vilbar Santana, Kuni Tomita, Ysty Veluz, Curt Walstead, and Tomihiro Yamaguchi	September 15, 2008	507	N/A
Dora, Boots, and Backpack go to a Backpack Parade, where Backpack will be the leader and sing her song, but her allergies cause her to drop all of her items.
101	2	"Benny's Big Race"	George Chialtas	Valerie Walsh Valdes	Bismarck "Butch" Datuin, Carol Delmindo Datuin, Jeff DeGrandis, and Ysty Veluz	September 16, 2008	505	N/A
Benny repairs his go-cart to finish a race and learns to never give up. Before the race, he, Dora, and Boots meet a few other racers who need help.
102	3	"Isa's Unicorn Flowers"	Allan Jacobsen	Rosemary Contreras	Carol Delmindo Datuin and Curt Walstead	September 17, 2008	504	N/A
Dora and Isa help Unicornio the Unicorn return to his home at the end of the rainbow with some unicorn flowers from Isa's garden.
103	4	"Dora's Jack-in-the-Box"	George Chialtas	Rosemary Contreras	Carol Delmindo Datuin, Curt Walstead, and Tomihiro Yamaguchi	September 18, 2008	501	N/A
Dora has found the perfect present for her baby brother and sister at a toy store: a Jack-in-the-Box. On the way home, Jack must learn when he is supposed to pop out of his box so Dora can give them the toy.
104	5	"Dora Saves the Snow Princess"	George Chialtas, Allan Jacobsen, and Henry Lenardin-Madden	Chris Gifford	Bismark "Butch" Datuin, Carol Delmindo Datuin, Enrico Vilbar Santana, Jose Silverio, Ysty Veluz, and Curt Walstead	November 3, 2008 (Note: This episode was first released in Dora Saves the Snow Princess DVD on September 30, 2008.)	519–520 (Note: Also listed under the syndication number #994.)	N/A
Sabrina the Snow Princess has had her magic crystal stolen by an evil witch who has locked her away in a tower in hopes that all the snow in the forest will melt. Dora, Boots, and the Snowflake Fairy set out to rescue the snow princess and prevent the snow from melting.
105	6	"The Mayan Adventure"	George Chialtas	Valerie Walsh Valdes	Carol Delmindo Datuin, Dean Kelly, Enrico Vilbar Santana, Jose Silverio, Ysty Veluz, and Tomihiro Yamaguchi	November 17, 2008	509	N/A
Dora and Boots jump into a storybook to help a set of twins win a Mayan ball game.
106	7	"Bouncy Boots"	Allan Jacobsen	Jorge Aguirre	Bismarck "Butch" Datuin, Jeff DeGrandis, Ysty Veluz, and Tomihiro Yamaguchi	November 18, 2008	508	N/A
Boots is waiting to get his boots fixed. But he instead ends up with bouncy boots that make him bounce. So Dora and Boots go to the shoe shop to get Boots' plain red boots back.
107	8	"The Big Red Chicken's Magic Show"	George Chialtas	Rosemary Contreras	Bismarck "Butch" Datuin, Dean Kelly, Kuni Tomita, and Ysty Veluz	November 19, 2008	511	N/A
Dora and Boots help the Big Red Chicken get ready for his magic show.
108	9	"Benny's Treasure"	Allan Jacobsen and Henry Lenardin-Madden	Henry Lenardin-Madden	Enrico Vilbar Santana and Jose Silverio	November 20, 2008	512	1.04 (2–5) (Note: (2-5) denotes the number of viewers the episode received with ages 2 through 5.)
Dora, Boots, and Benny need to rescue Backpack and Map, who are heading for the junkyard.
109	10	"Dora Saves Three Kings Day"	George Chialtas	Chris Gifford	Enrico Vilbar Santana and Jose Silverio	January 6, 2009 (Note: This episode was first released on Dora Saves Three Kings Day DVD on October 7, 2008.)	503	2.45
Dora, Boots, and Diego are all ready for the Three Kings Day party. But Swiper scares off Diego's elephant, Boots' camel, and Dora's horse! Now, the three must look for their respective animals in time for the party.
110	11	"Save Diego"	George Chialtas	Eric Weiner	Carol Datuin and Ysty Veluz	April 17, 2009 (Note: This episode was first released on Animal Adventures VHS/DVD on June 13, 2006.)	407	N/A
Diego has saved many animals, but now he's the one who needs to be saved because he ended up on a cliff when rescuing a parrot. If he falls off the cliff, he will get punctured by a large pile of cacti. Dora and Boots must rescue him before it's too late.
111	12	"Dora Saves the 3 Little Pigs"	Allan Jacobsen	Brian Bromberg	Carol Delmindo Datuin, Kuni Tomita, Curt Walstead, and Tomihiro Yamaguchi	June 5, 2009 (Note: This episode was first released on Dora and the 3 Little Pigs DVD on January 13, 2009.)	510	N/A
Dora, Boots, and Swiper set off in Fairytale Land to save the legendary fable of the Three Little Pigs. They also met a few other fairy tale characters who lost their items.
112	13	"Bark, Bark to Play Park!"	Henry Lenardin-Madden	Brian Bromberg	Bismark "Butch" Datuin, Kuni Tomita, and Ysty Veluz	September 25, 2009	502	N/A
It's Twins Day, and Dora, Boots, and Diego are off to Play Park to reunite Dora's puppy, Perrito, with his twin brother.
113	14	"Dora Saves the Crystal Kingdom"	George Chialtas and Allan Jacobsen	Chris Gifford	Bismarck "Butch" Datuin, Carol Delmindo Datuin, Enrico Vilbar Santana, Curt Walstead, Jose Silverio, and Ysty Veluz	November 1, 2009 (Note: This episode was first released in Dora Saves the Crystal Kingdom DVD on September 22, 2009.)	521–522 (Note: Also listed under the syndication number of #993.)	N/A
Dora and Boots must help a girl save the Crystal Kingdom when it's drained of color with the help of the Snow Princess.
114	15	"Dora's Christmas Carol Adventure"	George Chialtas, Allan Jacobsen, and Henry Lenardin-Madden	Chris Gifford	Bismarck "Butch" Datuin, Carol Delmindo Datuin, Enrico Vilbar Santana, Jose Silverio, Kuni Tomita, and Ysty Veluz	December 6, 2009 (Note: This episode was released in Dora's Christmas Carol Adventure DVD on November 3, 2009.)	525–526 (Note: Also listed under the syndication number of #991.)	N/A
Santa Claus narrates the story of when Swiper tried to swipe the star off the Christmas tree at Dora's Nochebuena party. He then finds himself on Santa's naughty list. When Dora tries to ask Santa if there's any way to take Swiper off the naughty list, Santa says the only way is that if Swiper learns the true meaning of Christmas.
115	16	"Swiper the Explorer"	Sherie Pollack (animation)	Eric Weiner	Alex Que and Jose Silverio	March 21, 2010 (Note: This episode was first released in Save the Day! VHS/DVD on January 10, 2006.)	418	N/A
Swiper reveals his good side when he travels with Dora and Boots and helps them to return a baby fox to its mother.
116	17	"The Super Babies' Dream Adventure"	Nancy Avery and George Chialtas	Jorge Aguirre	Carol Delmindo Datuin, Dean Kelly, Curt Walstead, and Tomihiro Yamaguchi	April 30, 2010 (Note: This episode was released in Super Babies Dream Adventure DVD on May 26, 2009.)	513	N/A
When the Super Babies have a nap, Dora and Boots travel to the Castle of Dreams. Meanwhile, the Dream Fairy is asleep and the Golden Rooster can't wake her up, so it's up to the Super Babies to solve the problem.
117	18	"Pirate Treasure Hunt"	Allan Jacobsen	Valerie Walsh Valdes	Bismarck "Butch" Datuin, Kuni Tomita, and Ysty Veluz	June 11, 2010	514	N/A
Dora and Boots are looking for a treasure chest with the Pirate Pig and his daughter, Little Pirate Pig.
118	19	"Dora's Big Birthday Adventure"	George Chialtas and Allan Jacobsen	Valerie Walsh Valdes	Bismarck "Butch" Datuin, Carol Delmindo Datuin, Enrico Vilbar Santana, and Jose Silverio	August 15, 2010 (Note: This episode was first released on Dora's Big Birthday Adventure DVD on August 3, 2010.)	523–524 (Note: Also listed under the syndication number #992.)	N/A
Dora and Boots need to get back home before Dora's birthday party starts. Note: This episode was made to celebrate the show's 10th anniversary.
119	20	"First Day of School"	Allan Jacobsen	Jorge Aguirre	Enrico Vilbar Santana and Jose Silverio	September 13, 2010	506	N/A
Boots and Tico are off to their first day of school, in which Boots will learn Spanish and Tico will learn English.
120	21	"Boots' Banana Wish"	Allan Jacobsen	Valerie Walsh Valdes	Carol Delmindo Datuin, Enrico Vilbar Santana, Ysty Veluz, and Curt Walstead	October 1, 2010	516	N/A
A wishing machine makes bananas drop on Boots endlessly. Boots is delighted to have this special treat, but soon, the wishing machine breaks and bananas won't stop appearing. He and Dora must find another one at Roberto's robot workshop. Along the way, Boots encounters several problems related to bananas and Dora must prevent him from saying the word, "bananas."

=== Season 6 (2010–12) ===
No. overall	No. in season	Title	Directed by	Written by	Storyboard by	Original release date	Prod. code
121	1	"Dora's Pegaso Adventure"	George Chialtas and Allan Jacobsen	Rosemary Contreras	Butch Datuin, Carol Datuin, Enrico Vilbar Santana, Jose Silverio, Arthur Valencia, and Ysty Veluz	November 5, 2010	601
Dora and Boots must find all the constellations after a meteor shower scares them away.
122	2	"Happy Birthday, Super Babies!"	George Chialtas and Allan Jacobsen	Valerie Walsh Valdes	Butch Datuin, Carol Datuin, Enrico Vilbar Santana, and Jose Silverio	November 15, 2010	602
The Super Babies team up with Dora and Boots to save birthday cakes from the cake-snatching bear.
123	3	"Dora's Hair-Raising Adventure"	George Chialtas and Allan Jacobson	Jorge Aguirre	Butch Datuin, Carol Datuin, Enrico Vilbar Santana, and Jose Silverio	November 16, 2010	603
Dora takes Boots to a barber shop for a haircut, before posing for a picture to send to his mom.
124	4	"Baby Winky Comes Home"	George Chialtas and Allan Jacobsen	Maria Escobedo	Nancy Avery, George Chialtas, Enrico Vilbar Santana, Arthur Valencia, and Ysty Veluz	November 17, 2010	604
Dora and Boots meet a little alien named Winky, and they must help him get back to his spaceship before it returns to the Purple Planet.
125	5	"Dora Helps the Birthday Wizzle"	George Chialtas	Rosemary Contreras	Enrico Vilbar Santana and Jose Silverio	November 18, 2010	515
Dora and Boots rescue a special wishing wand for the Birthday Wizzle.
126	6	"The Grumpy Old Troll Gets Married"	George Chialtas and Allan Jacobsen	Rosemary Contreras	Butch Datuin, Carol Datuin, Enrico Vilbar Santana, and Jose Silverio	February 14, 2011	605
The Grumpy Old Troll is marrying his girlfriend, Petunia. But he forgot to pick up the wedding rings from his grandmother's house. It's up to Dora, Boots, and the Troll to find the rings before the wedding starts.
127	7	"Dora's Ballet Adventure"; Dora’s Dance Show	George Chialtas and Allan Jacobsen	Teri Weiss	Bismarck "Butch" Datuin, Carol Delmindo Datuin, Enrico Vilbar Santana, and Jose Silverio	March 14, 2011	610
As Dora is preparing for a dance recital, the Delivery Duck brings her scuba flippers instead of ballet slippers. Now, Dora, Boots, and Diego must find the slippers before the recital begins. Along the way, Dora teaches her friends how to dance during a small situation to show that dancing can make one feel good.
128	8	"Boots' First Bike"	George Chialtas and Allan Jacobsen	Dana Chan	Butch Datuin, Carol Datuin, Enrico Vilbar Santana, and Jose Silverio	April 8, 2011	611
It's a big day of firsts when Boots gets his first bike from the bike shop.
129	9	"¡Vacaciones!"	George Chialtas and Allan Jacobsen	Brian J. Bromberg	Butch Datuin, Carol Datuin, Enrico Vilbar Santana, Jose Silverio, and Arthur Valencia	May 20, 2011	607
With their snacks, flashlight, and binoculars packed, Dora, Boots, and Diego are off to a camping trip with Baby Jaguar. Note: The title means "Vacations!" in Spanish.
130	10	"Pepe's School Day Adventure"	George Chialtas and Allan Jacobsen	Brian J. Bromberg	Bismarck "Butch" Datuin, Jose Silverio, Clint Taylor, Arthur Valencia, and Ysty Veluz	September 9, 2011	612
Dora and Boots try to help Pepe the Pig win a popcorn party at school.
131	11	"Dora's Enchanted Forest Adventures: The Tale of the Unicorn King"	George Chialtas and Allan Jacobsen	Rosemary Contreras	Carol Delmindo Datuin, Enrico Vilbar Santana, Clint Taylor, and Ysty Veluz	October 17, 2011 (Note: This episode was first released on Dora's Enchanted Forest Adventures DVD on September 13, 2011.)	613
Unicornio has been chosen to be king of the forest, so Dora, Boots, and Diego help him get to his castle.
132	12	"Halloween Parade"	George Chialtas and Allen Jacobson	Valerie Walsh Valdes	George Chialtas, Carol Datuin, Arthur Valencia, and Ysty Veluz	October 24, 2011 (Note: This episode was first released on Dora's Halloween Parade DVD on August 30, 2011.)	606
Dora and Boots must help Little Monster find a costume so he can march in the Halloween parade, which resembles Rio Carnival.
133	13	"Dora's Enchanted Forest Adventures: Dora Saves King Unicornio"	George Chialtas and Allan Jacobsen	Valerie Walsh Valdes	Bismarck "Butch" Datuin, Carol Delmindo Datuin, Enrico Vilbar Santana, Jose Silverio, Clint Taylor, Arthur Valencia, and Ysty Veluz	November 20, 2011	614–615 (Note: Also listed under the syndication number #990.)
The Enchanted Forest is in grave peril as the owl usurped Unicornio's position as king and trapped Unicornio. Dora and Boots must venture into the forest to rescue Unicornio and teach the owl a lesson.
134	14	"Dora's Enchanted Forest Adventures: The Secret of Atlantis"	George Chialtas and Allan Jacobsen	Chris Gifford	Bismarck "Butch" Datuin, Carol Delmindo Datuin, Enrico Vilbar Santana, and Jose Silverio	January 30, 2012	616
Dora, Boots, Diego, and King Unicornio leave the Enchanted Forest to end an ancient feud between the unicorns and the dragons, and to save the lost continent of Atlantis. Meanwhile, a greedy owl is given the opportunity to act as king and watch over the forest.
135	15	"The Big Red Chicken's Magic Wand"	George Chialtas and Allan Jacobsen	Rosemary Contreras	Kathy Carr, Carol Delmindo Datuin, Clint Taylor, and Arthur Valencia	January 31, 2012 (Note: This episode was first released on Dora Loves Boots DVD on December 27, 2011.)	608
The Big Red Chicken is performing magic tricks. For his first trick, he turns Boots into a chicken. When he tries to turn him back into a monkey, the Big Red Chicken lets out a big sneeze that propels his magic wand into Magic Land. Dora and friends set off on a magical journey in order to get the wand fixed so Boots can turn back into a monkey again. Note: This is the final episode where Caitlin Sanchez voices Dora.
136	16	"Swiper's Favorite Things"	George Chialtas and Allan Jacobsen	Rosemary Contreras	Bismarck "Butch" Datuin, Carol Delmindo Datuin, Enrico Vilbar Santana, Jose Silverio, Clint Taylor, Arthur Valencia, and Ysty Veluz	February 1, 2012	620
Swiper is packing all of his favorite things for a sleepover at his grandma's house: his pajama trunk, his favorite puppy book, and his very special funny bunny. Just as he is about to leave, a big wind gust comes in and blows everything away. Dora, Boots, and Swiper journey to Crocodile Lake, through the Tangled Forest, and race to Strawberry Hill to get Swiper's favorite things back. Note: This is the first episode in which Fátima Ptacek voices Dora.
137	17	"A Ribbon for Pinto"	George Chialtas and Allan Jacobsen	Valerie Walsh Valdes	Enrico Vilbar Santana and Jose Silverio	February 2, 2012	702
Dora, Boots, and Pinto are heading to the big horse show, but the train breaks down on the way. Note: This is the first episode to air and be produced in the HDTV 16:9 widescreen format.
138	18	"Dora's Knighthood Adventure"	George Chialtas and Allan Jacobsen	Jorge Aguirre	Bismarck "Butch" Datuin, Enrico Vilbar Santana, Jose Silverio, Arthur Valencia, and Ysty Veluz	February 3, 2012	619
Boots loves to hear stories about knights who go on heroic adventures and Don Quixote (voiced by Andy Garcia) tells Dora and Boots that anyone can be a knight if they help others. Boots would love to be a knight, and so would his friends Rocinante the Horse and Dapple the Donkey, but they need someone to rescue. Dora takes out her spotting scope and they discover a princess calling out for help from the Royal Garden. Dora, Boots, Rocinante, and Dapple set out through the puppet stage and past Tico's carousel, to get to the Royal Garden and save the princess, who is trapped near a fountain and her cat, who is stuck in a tree. Note: This is the final episode to be produced in the SDTV 4:3 fullscreen format since the show's premiere in 2000.

=== Season 7 (2012–13) ===
No. overall	No. in season	Title	Directed by	Written by	Storyboard by	Original release date	Prod. code	Viewers (millions)
139	1	"Dora's Rescue in Mermaid Kingdom"	George Chialtas and Allan Jacobsen	Valerie Walsh Valdes	Enrico Vilbar Santana and Jose Silverio	March 16, 2012	713	N/A
Dora and Boots turn into sea creatures to help a lost mermaid return to her mother.
140	2	"Dora's Easter Adventure"	George Chialtas and Allan Jacobsen	Rosemary Contreras	Bismark "Butch" Datuin, Carol Delmindo Datuin, Enrico Vilbar Santana, Jose Silverio, and Ysty Veluz	April 4, 2012 (Note: This episode was first released on Dora's Easter Adventure DVD on February 14, 2012.)	701	N/A
Dora and Boots meet the Easter Bunny, who is disguised as the Hip-Hop Bunny and only speaks in rapping. Swiper swipes the Hip-Hop Bunny's basket, so the trio must get it back in time for the Easter party.
141	3	"Dora in Troll Land"	George Chialtas and Allan Jacobsen	Jorge Aguirre	Butch Datuin, Carol Datuin, Enrico Vilbar Santana, Jose Silverio, Arthur Valencia, and Ysty Veluz	May 16, 2012	609	N/A
Dora and her friends explore Troll Land, a secret place where the Grumpy Old Troll lives. In this kind of dimension, everything rhymes.
142	4	"¡Feliz Dia de los Padres!"	George Chialtas and Allan Jacobsen	Dana Chan	Enrico Vilbar Santana and Jose Silverio	June 15, 2012	704	N/A
Dora makes a kite for her Papi on Father's Day, and must retrieve it when it gets blown away. Note: The title of this episode means "Happy Father's Day" in Spanish.
143	5	"Dora's Fantastic Gymnastics Adventure"	George Chialtas	Brian J. Bromberg	Enrico Vilbar Santana and Jose Silverio	August 13, 2012 (Note: This episode was first released on Dora's Fantastic Gymnastics Adventure DVD on July 31, 2012.)	705	2.43
Dora and Boots are practicing for the Fantastic Gymnastics Show when Dora gets a special delivery: a beautiful rainbow ribbon. However, Swiper swipes the ribbon, so the duo must get it back in time for the show.
144	6	"School Science Fair"	George Chialtas and Allan Jacobsen	Dana Chan	Kathy Carr, Bismark "Butch" Datuin, and David Prince	September 7, 2012	712	N/A
Dora and Emma are bringing a model volcano to the Green Power Science Fair. Note: This episode features a younger version of Emma, one of Dora's grown-up friends in Dora and Friends: Into the City!.
145	7	"Dora's Moonlight Adventure"	George Chialtas and Allan Jacobsen	Chris Gifford	Bismark "Butch" Datuin and Clint Taylor	September 14, 2012 (Note: This episode was first released on Dora's Rescue in Mermaid Kingdom DVD on June 26, 2012.)	706	N/A
Dora and Boots take care of some kittens for Abuela and have a dream adventure when one of them goes missing in a storybook world chasing a ball of string.
146	8	"Perrito's Big Surprise"	George Chialtas and Allan Jacobsen	Rosemary Contreras	Kathy Carr, Carol Delmindo Datuin, and Ysty Veluz	October 15, 2012	707	1.31
There's a surprise present waiting for Perrito, but Swiper wants to swipe it. Dora must prevent Swiper from doing so at Surprise Hill.
147	9	"Dora and Diego's Amazing Animal Circus Adventure"	George Chialtas and Allan Jacobsen	Chris Gifford	Kathy Carr, Carol Delmindo Datuin, Enrico Vilbar Santana, and Ysty Veluz	October 16, 2012	719	1.24
Boots and Baby Jaguar are having an animal circus, and Dora and Diego rush to get there.
148	10	"Benny the Castaway"	Allan Jacobsen and Henry Lenardin-Madden	Jorge Aguirre	Bismark "Butch" Datuin and Clint Taylor	October 17, 2012	703	1.33
Benny gets stranded on the crazy, deserted Coconut Island, and it's up to Dora and Boots to save him.
149	11	"Baby Bongo's Big Music Show"	George Chialtas and Allan Jacobsen	Leslie Valdes	Bismark "Butch" Datuin and Carol Delmindo Datuin	October 18, 2012	711	1.39
Dora and Boots help a little bongo drum get to his first music show.
150	12	"Dora's Royal Rescue"	George Chialtas and Allan Jacobsen	Chris Gifford	Kathy Carr, Bismarck "Butch" Datuin, Carol Delmindo Datuin, Gloria Y. Jenkins, Enrico Vilbar Santana, Jose Silverio, Clint Taylor, and Ysty Veluz	November 5, 2012 (Note: This episode was first released on Dora's Royal Rescue DVD on October 2, 2012.)	617–618 (Note: Also listed under the syndication number #989.)	2.57
Dora and Boots become a lady knight and a squire, and assist a noble horse in saving Don Quixote, who's been captured by an evil wizard and is being held in an abandoned library.
151	13	"Dora's Thanksgiving Day Parade"	George Chialtas, Allan Jacobsen, and Henry Lenardin-Madden	Jorge Aguirre	Bismark "Butch" Datuin and Clint Taylor	November 19, 2012	708	1.65
Dora and Boots rush to get Dora's float back for the Thanksgiving Day parade when the Pirate Piggies cause it to fly away.
152	14	"Book Explorers"	George Chialtas and Allan Jacobsen	Valerie Walsh Valdes	David Prince and Clint Taylor	November 26, 2012	720	1.28
Dora and Boots visit the library, where they jump into three books, meet characters from them, and help them find their lost items.
153	15	"Check Up Day"	George Chialtas, Allan Jacobsen, and Henry Lenardin-Madden	Valerie Walsh Valdes	Kathy Carr, Carol Delmindo Datuin, Mary Hanley, David Prince, and Ysty Veluz	November 27, 2012	709	1.26
Dora is at the doctor's office for her yearly check up. There, she meets a few animals who are sick and learns that getting a shot isn't as bad as it looks.
154	16	"Little Map"	George Chialtas and Allan Jacobsen	Rosemary Contreras	Enrico Vilbar Santana and Jose Silvero	November 28, 2012	710	1.35
Map shows his nephew, Little Map, how to draw pictures and make a treasure map. Soon, Dora and Boots go on a treasure hunt of their own.
155	17	"¡Vamos a Pintar!"	George Chialtas and Allan Jacobsen	Brian J. Bromberg	Enrico Vilber Santana and Jose Silvero	November 29, 2012	714	1.38
Dora and Boots have to bring their special paintbrush to help their painter friend at the art studio. Note: The title of this episode means "We'll Paint!" in Spanish.
156	18	"Dora Rocks!"	George Chialtas and Allan Jacobsen	Jorge Aguirre	Carol Delmindo Datuin, Enrico Vilbar Santana, and Jose Slivero	January 14, 2013 (Note: This episode was first released in Dora Rocks! DVD on December 30, 2012.)	717	2.27
Dora and Boots have to get to Benny's barn so they can use Dora's microphone to invite their friends over for a sing-along party.
157	19	"The Butterfly Ball"	George Chialtas and Allan Jacobsen	Rosemary Contreras	Bismark "Butch" Datuin and Clint Taylor	January 16, 2013	718	1.35
Dora, Boots, Diego, and Baby Jaguar must help their butterfly friend, Mariposa, get to the Butterfly Ball, where everyone gets their special set of wings.

=== Season 8 (2013–15; 2019) ===
The final six episodes remained unaired in the United States until July 7, 2019, to commemorate the release of Dora and the Lost City of Gold.

No. overall	No. in season	Title	Directed by	Written by	Storyboard by	Original release date	Prod. code	U.S. viewers (millions)
158	1	"Dora and Perrito to the Rescue"	George Chialtas, Allan Jacobsen, and Henry Lenardin-Madden	Valerie Walsh Valdes	Adam Henry, Kuni Tomita, and Ysty Veluz	March 18, 2013	805	1.67
Dora and Perrito rush to the river to save Boots.
159	2	"Puppies Galore"	George Chialtas, Allan Jacobsen, and Henry Lenardin-Madden	Jorge Aguirre	Kathy Carr, Bismark "Butch" Datuin, Enrico Vilbar Santana, and Clint Taylor	March 20, 2013	802	1.33
Dora, Boots, and Benny accompany a bunch of puppies to rescue a young one named Little Boots.
160	3	"Catch That Shape Train"	George Chialtas and Allan Jacobsen	Brian J. Bromberg	Adam Henry and Enrico Vilbar Santana	June 3, 2013	803	1.65
Dora and Boots make a train out of shapes in Boots' sticker book, and they jump in to retrieve the forgotten steering wheel before the train heads for the final turn on the tracks.
161	4	"Kittens in Mittens"	George Chialtas and Allan Jacobsen	Dana Chan	Kathy Carr and Ysty Veluz	June 5, 2013	807	1.84
Dora reads "The Three Little Kittens" to Abuela's new cat, Lucky, and jumps into the book of nursery rhymes to help the kittens find their mittens.
162	5	"Dora's Great Roller Skate Adventure"	George Chialtas and Allan Jacobsen	Chris Gifford	Kathy Carr, Bismark "Butch" Datuin, Clint Taylor, and Ysty Veluz	September 22, 2013 (Note: This episode was first release in Dora's Great Roller Skate Adventure DVD on September 10, 2013.)	808	1.43
Dora, Boots, and Diego help their magical roller skates stand up to a bully in order to open up the Skate Park to everyone.
163	6	"Verde's Birthday Party!"	George Chialtas and Allan Jacobsen	Rosemary Contreras	Bismark "Butch" Datuin, John Eddings, Pete Mekis, Edemer Santos, Clint Taylor, Janice Tolentino, Arthur Valencia, and Christopher Ybarra	September 30, 2013	804	1.64
Dora, Boots, and Verde the Clean-Up Truck must clear up a flood at Party Park in time for Verde's birthday party.
164	7	"Dora's and Sparky's Riding Adventure!"	George Chialtas, Allan Jacobsen, and Henry Lenardin-Madden	Jorge Aguirre	Bismark "Butch" Datuin and Clint Taylor	October 2, 2013	809	1.41
165	8	"Dora's Rainforest Talent Show"	George Chialtas and Allan Jacobsen	Brian J. Bromberg	Kathy Carr, Carol Delmindo Datuin, Adam Henry, and Janice Tolentino	October 28, 2013	814	1.38
166	9	"Dora and Diego in the Time of Dinosaurs"	George Chialtas and Allan Jacobsen	Chris Gifford	Bismark "Butch" Datuin and Clint Taylor	October 30, 2013	815	1.20
Dora and Diego travel back to prehistoric times and go on a dinosaur adventure to find Baby Jaguar.
167	10	"Dora's Ice Skating Spectacular"	George Chialtas, Allan Jacobsen, and Henry Lenardin-Madden	Teri Weiss	Carol Delmindo Datuin and Enrico Vilbar Santana	November 25, 2013 (Note: This episode was first release in Dora's Ice Skating Spectacular DVD on November 5, 2013.)	811	2.81
Dora and Boots must help the Snow Princess defeat the Ice Witch (Hilary Duff) in a skating contest in order to win back everyone's skates.
168	11	"Riding the Roller Coaster Rocks"	George Chialtas and Allan Jacobsen	Jorge Aguirre	Adam Henry and Enrico Vilbar Santana	January 24, 2014	806	1.27
Dora, Boots, and Abuela are exploring the rainforest, looking for the secret door to Adventure Forest. It's a magical forest amusement park that Abuela used to go to when she was a little girl. Her favorite ride was the Roller Coaster Rocks, which she's always dreamed of riding one more time. While now at Adventure Forest, the group rides tea cups and log rides, and swings through trees on their way to the Roller Coaster Rocks.
169	12	"Dora in Wonderland"	George Chialtas, Allan Jacobsen, and Henry Lenardin-Madden	Chris Gifford	Kathy Carr, Bismark "Butch" Datuin, Carol Delmindo Datuin, Enrico Vilbar Santana, Jose Silverio, Kuni Tomita, and Ysty Veluz	March 10, 2014 (Note: This episode was first released in Dora in Wonderland DVD on March 4, 2014.)	715–716 (Note: Also listed under the syndication number #988.)	2.07
When Abuela's kittens run through a magic mirror, Dora and Boots end up in Wonderland. Note: This is the 12th double-length episode.
170	13	"Dora's Museum Sleepover Adventure"	George Chialtas and Allan Jacobsen	Dana Chan	Kathy Carr, Carol Delmindo Datuin, and Ysty Veluz	March 27, 2014	810	1.44
Dora brings a magic cape to the prince's castle to break a spell.
171	14	"Dora's Super Soccer Showdown"	George Chialtas, Allan Jacobsen, and Henry Lenardin-Madden	Rosemary Contreras	Kathy Carr, Bismark "Butch" Datuin, Enrico Vilbar Santana, and Jose Silverio	June 5, 2014	801	2.13
Dora travels to Brazil to play in the Big Cup Soccer Tournament against a team of soccer-playing monsters.
172	15	"Dora Saves Fairytale Land"	George Chialtas and Allan Jacobsen	Valerie Walsh Valdes	Kathy Carr, Bismark "Butch" Datuin, Enrico Vilbar Santana, and Clint Taylor	July 7, 2019 (Note: This episode was first released in Dora Saves Fairytale Land on DVD on June 2, 2015.)	812–813 (Note: Also listed under the syndication number #987.)	0.51
Dora and Boots return to Fairytale Land to help the King and Queen when the place starts to lose its magic. To save the Ivy Brick Wall, they need to get magical water, but it is surrounded by all the bad fairy tale characters. Note: This is the 13th and final double-length episode.
173	16	"Dora's Night Light Adventure"	George Chailtas, Allan Jacobsen, and Henry Lenardin-Madden	Rosemary Contreras	Kathy Carr, Bismark "Butch" Datuin, Enrico Vilbar Santana, and Jose Silverio	July 14, 2019 (Note: This episode first aired in Canada and the UK on April 24, 2015.)	820	0.33
174	17	"Dora's Fairy Godmother Rescue" "Dora and Boots Help the Fairy Godmother"	George Chialtas and Allan Jacobsen	Rosemary Contreras	Kathy Carr and Enrico Vilbar Santana	July 21, 2019 (Note: This episode first aired in Canada and the UK on April 22, 2015.)	818	0.35
175	18	"Dora's Animalito Adventure"	George Chialtas and Allan Jacobsen	Chris Gifford	Kuni Tomita	July 28, 2019 (Note: This episode first aired in Canada and the UK on April 23, 2015.)	819	0.24
176	19	"Dora and the Very Sleepy Bear"	George Chialtas and Allan Jacobsen	Jorge Aguirre	Carol Delmindo Datuin, Enrico Vilbar Santana and Ysty Veluz	August 4, 2019 (Note: This episode first aired in Canada and the UK on April 20, 2015.)	816	0.34
177	20	"Let's Go to Music School"	George Chialtas and Allan Jacobsen	Valerie Walsh Valdes	Bismark "Butch" Datuin and Clint Taylor	August 9, 2019 (Note: This episode first aired in Canada and the UK on April 21, 2015.)	817	0.54
Dora, Emma, and Kate help Gus the Bus take all of the instruments to the children at the Music School. Note: This is the final episode of the series, and was aired on the same day of the theatrical release of Dora and the Lost City of Gold.
