= Doug (tuber) =

Individual tuber in the Cucurbitaceae family

- Species: Cucurbitaceae (nominated to Guinness World Records as the world's largest potato before genetic testing confirmed it was not actually a potato)
- Location: Hamilton, New Zealand

Doug, also known as Dug, is a tuber in the Cucurbitaceae family that was grown by Colin and Donna Craig-Brown near Hamilton in New Zealand. Weighing roughly 7.9 kg (17½ lb), it was thought to be the largest potato on record for a period after its discovery, topping the 5 kg (11 lb) record holder at the time. However, genetic testing revealed that Doug is not, in fact, a potato.

== Background ==
On 30 August 2021, while the Craig-Browns were weeding their garden near Hamilton, Colin's hoe struck what he initially thought was a fungal growth or a sweet potato beneath the surface; he discarded these ideas after realising the object's size. The couple dug around the object. Colin extracted it with a garden fork, scratched its skin, tasted it, and decided that it was a potato. The couple weighed it and named it Doug, after the word dug.

Doug grew in popularity locally and on Facebook, where the couple occasionally posted photographs of it. At the suggestion of friends, the Craig-Browns submitted an application for the tuber, which was being kept in a freezer at the time, to Guinness World Records, in the category of largest potato. Doug was verified as being a potato by several gardening experts, but doubts persisted. In March 2022, the Craig-Browns' application was declined after genetic testing conducted by Plant & Food Research confirmed that Doug was the "tuber of a type of gourd". Chris Claridge, who assisted in the genetic testing, suggested that the tuber may have grown as the result of infection or disease.

Colin Craig-Brown had previously stated that he planned to turn Doug into vodka once the tuber's popularity died down.
