= Chris Gifford (writer) =

American screenwriter, former actor (b. 1959)

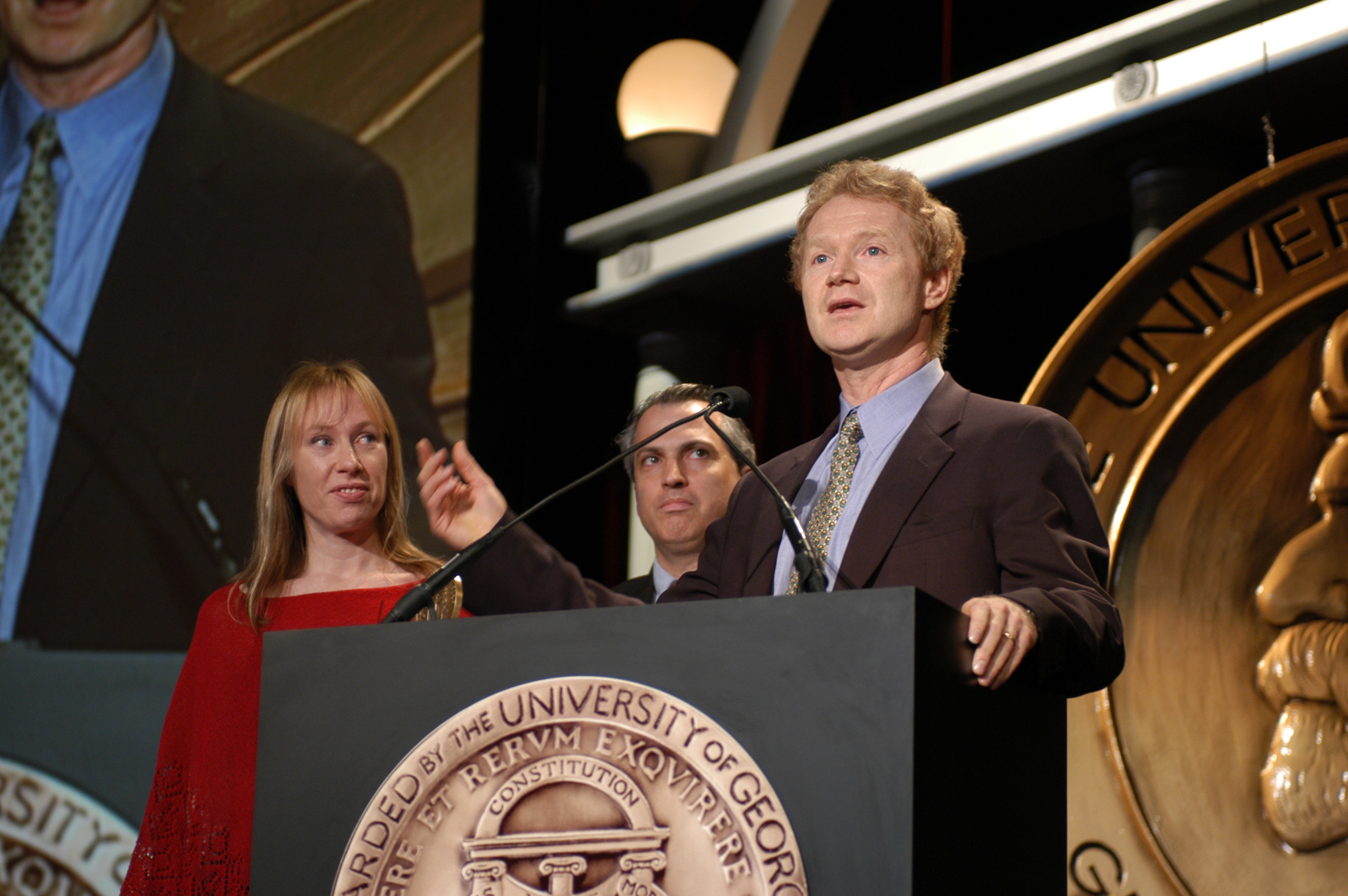
- Gifford (right) (standing) at the 63rd Annual Peabody Awards in 2004
- Born: May 3, 1959 (age 66); New York City, U.S.
- Education: Connecticut College
- Occupations: Writer; executive producer
- Known for: Dora the Explorer

Chris Gifford (born May 3, 1959) is an American writer and executive producer at Nickelodeon. He co-created the Peabody Award-winning children's series Dora the Explorer and its spin-offs Go, Diego, Go!, and Dora and Friends: Into the City!, and was the voice of some of the show's characters, including Big Red Chicken, the Grumpy Old Troll, and the Pirate Captain Pig. He was a cast member (playing "Danny") on the 1980s syndicated children's series The Great Space Coaster.

Gifford attended the Browning School and is a resident of Montclair, New Jersey.
