= Northeast Film Festival =

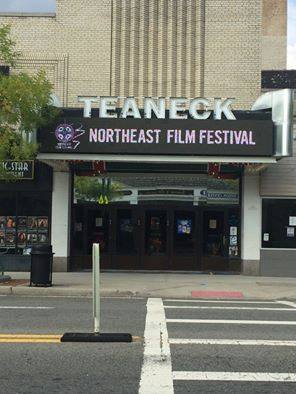
Northeast Film Festival held at the Teaneck Cinemas in Teaneck, NJ

The Northeast Film Festival is a film festival founded in 2013 in Teaneck, New Jersey, at the historic Teaneck Cinemas. Held annually in September, the festival features both US and international films with competition in feature length and short fiction as well as documentaries and student films.

== 2013 Northeast Film Festival ==
The 2013 Northeast Film Festival was originally held in Maplewood, NJ while the Teaneck Cinemas was undergoing construction. 26 films were shown from September 13–15 with comedian Mary Dimino hosting the awards gala. The Lifetime Achievement Award was given to 2 time Emmy nominated actor David Harris. The feature film Surviving Family won awards for Best Feature, Best Director, Best Actress, Best Supporting Actor (Vincent Pastore), Best Screenplay and Breakout Performance. The short film Maniac won 3 awards including Best Short (Producer Sam Borowski), Best Director (Sam Borowski) and Best Actor (Bill Sorvino). Other winners and nominees included Edie McClurg, Pruitt Taylor Vince, Gianni Russo, Scott Wolf, Olympia Dukakis, and Phyllis Somerville.

== 2014 Northeast Film Festival ==
The 2014 Northeast Film Festival screened 40 films and was held from September 5–7. The Lifetime Achievement Award was given to legendary producer Sam Sherman, with a Spirit of Independent Filmmaking Award being given to Lloyd Kaufman and the Icon Award given to Harry Lennix. Before I Disappear, directed by Oscar winner Shawn Christensen, was the opening night feature and won Best Feature, Best Director, Best Actress (Fatima Ptacek), Best Actor (Shawn Christensen), and Best Supporting Actress (Emmy Rossum), It also was nominated for 4 additional awards, Best Screenplay, Best Supporting Actress (Isabelle McNally) and both Ron Perlman and Paul Wesley for Best Supporting Actor. The Make a Film Foundation film The Magic Bracelet won Best Short and Best Story Concept. Some other winners included Eric Roberts for Best Supporting Actor, Summer Glau for Best Actress In a Short, and Tom Proctor for Best Actor in a Short. The gala awards ceremony was hosted by comedian Mary Dimino with guest presenters Vincent Pastore and David Harris.

== 2015 Northeast Film Festival ==
The 2015 Northeast Film Festival screened 59 films and was held from September 11–13. The Award of Distinguishment in Acting was given to Robert Clohessy, with a Rising Star Award being given to Fatima Ptacek. Voiceless won Best Feature Film. Wasted Beauty won Best Short Film. Andrew Napier won the award for Best Documentary for Bounce: How the Ball Taught the World to Play. Andrew was Executive Producer and editor of Wasted Beauty, Bounce:How the Ball Taught the World to Play, as well as Executive Producer of Limbo and Lord of Catan. Some other winners included Jay Huguley (Sunny in the Dark) for Best Actor. Douglas Smith (The Gift) Best Actor in a Short. Amy Acker (The Lord of Catan) for Best Actress in a Short. The gala awards ceremony was hosted by comedian Mary Dimino with guest presenter Fatima Ptacek.

== 2016 Northeast Film Festival ==
The 2016 Northeast Film Festival screened 58 films and was held from September 9–11. Lust for Love won Best Feature Film. Fragile Storm (starring Lance Henriksen) won Best Short Film. Some other winners included Jamie Bamber (Money) for Best Actor. Henry Ian Cusick (Visible) Best Actor in a Short. Dichen Lachman (Lust for Love) for Best Actress. Trieste Kelly Dunn (The Push) for Best Actress in a Short. Some other nominees included Christopher Lloyd, Sonya Walger, Jess Weixler, and Alexandra Turshen. An Outstanding Contribution to Filmmaking Award was given to Andrew Napier.

== See also ==
- List of film festivals in New Jersey
- Television and film in New Jersey
- New Jersey Motion Picture and Television Commission
