= The Vanishing of Sidney Hall =

2017 American mystery drama film

- Theatrical release poster
- Directed by: Shawn Christensen
- Written by: Shawn Christensen; Jason Dolan
- Produced by: Jonathan Schwartz
- Starring: Logan Lerman; Elle Fanning; Michelle Monaghan; Nathan Lane; Kyle Chandler
- Cinematography: Daniel Katz
- Edited by: Sabine Hoffman
- Music by: Darren Morze
- Production companies: Super Crispy Entertainment; Fuzzy Logic Pictures
- Distributed by: A24; DirecTV Cinema
- Release dates: January 25, 2017 (Sundance Film Festival); March 2, 2018 (United States)
- Running time: 117 minutes
- Country: United States
- Language: English

The Vanishing of Sidney Hall (originally titled Sidney Hall) is a 2017 American mystery drama film directed and co-written by Shawn Christensen and starring Logan Lerman, Elle Fanning, Michelle Monaghan, Nathan Lane and Kyle Chandler.

Principal photography of The Vanishing of Sidney Hall began in late April 2016. The film premiered at the Sundance Film Festival on January 25, 2017. The film was released on January 25, 2018, through DirecTV Cinema before a limited release on March 2, 2018, by A24, and was released on DVD and Blu-ray on March 20, 2018, by Lionsgate Home Entertainment.

== Plot ==
The film centers around Sidney Hall, a young novelist whose life is depicted in a non-linear narrative through elliptical flashbacks and flash-forwards through three periods of his life.

At the age of eighteen, Sidney reads a story to his English class about masturbating in the sixth grade, to the chagrin of his teacher. He is spared from expulsion by a fellow English teacher, Duane Jones, who encourages him with his writing. Sidney is subsequently approached by a bully, Brett Newport, who requests assistance with digging up a package they buried when they were small children. Sidney declines and returns home to his abusive mother Velouria, his downtrodden disabled father Gerald, as well as a love letter from an unidentified "Melody". Duane encourages Sidney to use unorthodox, loud tactics to draw Melody out, which he attempts, to no avail.

He spots a girl from the Jameson family across the street and correctly deduces that she is Melody, though she is hesitant to directly interact with him. After seeing Brett bully a classmate, Sidney agrees to help him dig up the package, on the condition that he ceases bullying. The pair go and dig the package up, but as they are about to part ways, Brett's father, Judge George Newport, violently arrives on the scene and Brett is forced to hand the package off to Sidney. Sidney watches the tape, to discover that it is a recording of Judge Newport raping an adolescent girl. Sidney and Brett rendezvous and agree to go to the authorities with the tape.

Melody calls Sidney and arranges an impromptu date to the fair with him, in which she takes her family's car without permission. At the fair, they bond and Melody admires a small wooden statue at a booth. The carver at the booth, Johan Tidemand, gives Sidney the statue for free. Having watched Brett's tape and read Sidney's unflattering personal notebooks, Velouria confronts Sidney and throws them into the fireplace. Sidney informs Brett that the tape is destroyed, prompting Brett to commit suicide. This inspires Sidney to begin writing a controversial novel called "Suburban Tragedy", which Duane admires and sends to the publisher Harold, at Porter House, who inks a book deal, with Duane as Sidney's agent. Sidney confronts Velouria about him moving away. She attacks Sidney, who hits his head on a mantelpiece. Sidney and Melody subsequently move away together.

At the age of twenty-four, Sidney is a successful, albeit alcoholic, writer with two books - Suburban Tragedy and State of Execution - atop The New York Times Best Seller list and his name in contention for a Pulitzer Prize. He has hallucinations, as his head injury left scarring on the right side of his brain. At a book signing, Sidney meets an obsessed fan called Henry Crowe, who quotes Suburban Tragedy and speaks of knowing what must be done. Shortly after, Crowe attempts murder and commits suicide, casting the book in a negative light, leading to a competitor on the list, Francis Bishop, to win the Pulitzer. With his marriage to Melody failing, Sidney has a discreet, ongoing affair with Harold's daughter, Alexandra. Melody informs Sidney that she is pregnant, though she insists that he be honest if he is having an affair, which he denies. He reveals that he purchased their dream house in New Mexico. While Sidney and Melody are at a restaurant, Alexandra confronts them, revealing the affair. Sidney and Melody make their way to their apartment, and while Melody attempts to leave in the elevator, the power goes out, trapping them. Melody suffers an asthma attack and due to not having her inhaler, dies in Sidney's arms in the elevator. Sidney leaves his apartment with the keys inside.

At the age of thirty, Sidney has not been seen nor heard from in five years. Downtrodden, he spends his time going from library to library, burning copies of his books. An apparent detective, The Searcher, traces his steps and interviews those who have known him, including two librarians, Duane and Johan, who forged identities for him. After making his way to New Mexico and riding on trains with his dog, Sidney is arrested for having an open alcohol container in public. The Searcher bails Sidney out of jail and takes him for breakfast, where he reveals himself to be Francis Bishop, wishing to write a biography about Sidney. Francis takes Sidney to the house in New Mexico, where Francis reveals that the positive influence from Suburban Tragedy dissuaded his son from committing suicide. The writers part ways. Sidney's health takes a turn for the worse from the seizures and effects from alcoholism, putting him in a terminal state in the hospital. Sidney summons Francis, to whom he gives all his writings and reveals the secrets about the inspiration for Suburban Tragedy, as well as Judge Newport's perversion. Sidney goes silent and Francis departs from the hospital room. Sidney sees a vision of Melody and, taking the form of his eighteen-year-old self, holds her hand as he passes away.

== Cast ==
- Logan Lerman as Sidney Hall, Melody's boyfriend and later husband, Velouria and Gerald's son
- Elle Fanning as Melody Jameson, Sidney's girlfriend and later wife
- Michelle Monaghan as Velouria Hall, Sidney's mother and Gerald's wife
- Kyle Chandler as The Searcher/Francis Bishop
- Blake Jenner as Brett Newport, Sidney's schoolmate
- Nathan Lane as Harold, Sidney's literary agent and Alexandra's father
- Margaret Qualley as Alexandra, Harold's daughter, who Sidney has an affair with.
- Yahya Abdul-Mateen II as Duane Jones, Sidney's English teacher
- Tim Blake Nelson as Johan Tidemand, a sculptor Sidney befriends
- Janina Gavankar as Gina, Sidney's personal assistant
- Darren Pettie as Gerald Hall, Sidney's father and Velouria's husband
- Alex Karpovsky as David Bauer

== Production ==
=== Development ===
While touring alongside The Killers in the United States with his band, Stellastarr in 2004, Shawn Christensen wrote a spec script called Sidney Hall with his best friend and roommate Jason Dolan, which he shared in increments with his friend, Paul Wesley. The inspiration for the screenplay was that Christensen and Dolan mused about the differences in life between the ages of eighteen and when they would turn thirty. They initially considered to make the titular character into an influential rock musician, but decided to go with the route of him being an author, when they realized the expectations of creating new music that could realistically be considered groundbreaking. Wesley received the completed draft of the screenplay, which he described in an interview as, "one of the most beautiful things [he] ever read in [his] life". Wesley presented the screenplay to William Morris Endeavor, which signed both Christensen and Dolan. The screenplay for Sidney Hall was first reported to have been acquired through a discretionary fund by Scott Free Productions in 2008. Joe Russo was to direct, Michael Costigan was to be the producer, Ridley Scott and Tony Scott were to be the executive producers and Jim Sturgess was to play the titular character.

After the release of his feature length directorial debut in 2014, Before I Disappear, Christensen looked to Sidney Hall as his next project, which had not seen active development by Fox Searchlight Pictures in five years. A number of film production companies, including Amazon Studios, aggressively pursued rights to the film, but Christensen opted to have the film independently produced and financed.

=== Casting ===
For casting the titular protagonist that Jim Sturgess was previously attached to portray, Shawn Christensen auditioned a significant number of young male actors, before twenty-four year-old Logan Lerman was cast to play the character for all three stages of his life portrayed. According to Lerman, he was brought onto the project a year prior to the commencement of principal photography and assisted Christensen and producer Jonathan Schwartz with executive producing. On April 13, 2016, Lerman's involvement with the project was revealed, along with Elle Fanning playing opposite of him. On April 21, Michelle Monaghan, Kyle Chandler and Nathan Lane were announced to have joined the principal cast, as well. Variety revealed on April 25 that Blake Jenner, Margaret Qualley and Tim Blake Nelson had joined the cast.

=== Filming ===
Principal photography of the film began on April 22, 2016, at the Rockefeller State Park Preserve, in Pleasantville, New York. Approximately a third of the film takes place in a suburban setting, inspired by Christensen's hometown of Wappingers Falls, New York. However, due to a tax credit that made production less expensive, the suburban scenes were shot in Rockland County, New York. The cinematographer, Daniel Katz, shot the film with an Arri Alexa Studio and predominantly with natural lighting, as well as different kinds of lights for the three stages of the main character's life. The production team considered utilizing traditional photographic film, but opted for digital cinematography, due to the feasibility of utilizing it for an independent production. According to Logan Lerman, an excess of footage was captured, in order to create more options for the post-production stage. The production featured twelve-hour work days, beginning in April and going into May, shot between New York and New Mexico.

=== Music ===
Darren Morze, who composes all of Christensen's films, was hired to do the music for The Vanishing of Sidney Hall. Utilizing a computer in his home's recording studio, Morze began composing the music prior to the principal photography stage, which allowed for the music to be played on set, to help the actors understand the mood of their scenes. Morze and Christensen considered a number of sources of inspiration for the score, including Vangelis and John Carpenter. Due to tonal needs, they decided to pursue a score complementary to Philip Glass's work- even including a single composed by him. Contrary to Christensen's previous works that featured somber soundtracks, Morze looked to give The Vanishing of Sidney Hall a generally more hopeful tone. According to Morze, he committed more time to composing in August 2016 and continued to work alone on the score for the film until just prior to its release in January 2017.

== Release ==
Sidney Hall premiered at the 2017 Sundance Film Festival, in Park City, Utah. The film was first screened on January 25, 2017. In April 2017, A24 and DirecTV Cinema acquired distribution rights to the film. The film, re-titled The Vanishing of Sidney Hall, was released on January 25, 2018, through DirecTV Cinema before a limited release on March 2, 2018, and was released on DVD and Blu-ray on March 20, 2018, by Lionsgate Home Entertainment.

== Reception ==
=== Box office ===
The film grossed $923,465 in worldwide theatrical box office, and $176,242 with home video sales.

=== Critical response ===
On review aggregator website Rotten Tomatoes, the film holds an approval rating of 12% based on 26 reviews and an average rating of 2.8/10. The critics consensus reads: "There's no mystery here: The Vanishing of Sidney Hall may be nicely shot, but it is ultimately vapid and forgettable." On Metacritic, the film has a weighted average score of 18 out of 100, based on 11 critics, indicating "overwhelming dislike".

Writing for RogerEbert.com, Glenn Kenny gave it no stars and a thumbs down, and called it "worthless woman-hating garbage". Robert Abele of the Los Angeles Times called it a "risible indie drama" that "grates as both an agonized-artist pity party and a male fantasy of envied power". At The New York Times, Jeannette Catsoulis praised the cinematography and performances of the supporting cast, but described it in service of a film she described as a "tortured mystery dripping with pretentiousness."
