= Shawn Christensen =

American filmmaker, musician, and podcaster

- Christensen at the 2026 Toronto International Film Festival.
- Born: Poughkeepsie, New York, U.S.
- Education: Pratt Institute
- Occupations: Screenwriter; film director; singer-songwriter; actor; podcaster; painter
- Years active: 2000–present
- Notable work: Curfew; Before I Disappear; The Vanishing of Sidney Hall
- Musical career
- Genres: Indie rock; post-punk revival; alternative rock
- Instruments: Vocals; guitar
- Labels: RCA; Bloated Wife Records
- Formerly of: Stellastarr

Shawn Christensen is an American musician, filmmaker, podcaster and artist. He is a graduate of Pratt Institute, where he earned a Bachelor of Fine Arts in illustration and graphic design. Christensen was the frontman of the indie rock band Stellastarr. In 2013, he won the Academy Award for Best Live Action Short Film for his short film Curfew.

== Early life ==
Shawn Christensen was born and raised in Poughkeepsie, New York, United States. Christensen's father was an engineer and his mother was a librarian, with him being their only child. He enrolled at Pratt Institute, where he pursued a degree in graphic design and illustration. During weekend acting classes, he befriended sixteen-year-old Paul Wesley. Christensen was the lead vocalist and lead guitar in a college band called Ghistor, composed of himself, bassist Amanda Tannen and drummer Arthur Kremer. After Christensen graduated from Pratt with a Bachelor of Fine Arts, they disbanded. He produced and sold abstract-realistic paintings generally themed around prominent rock music figures.

== Career ==
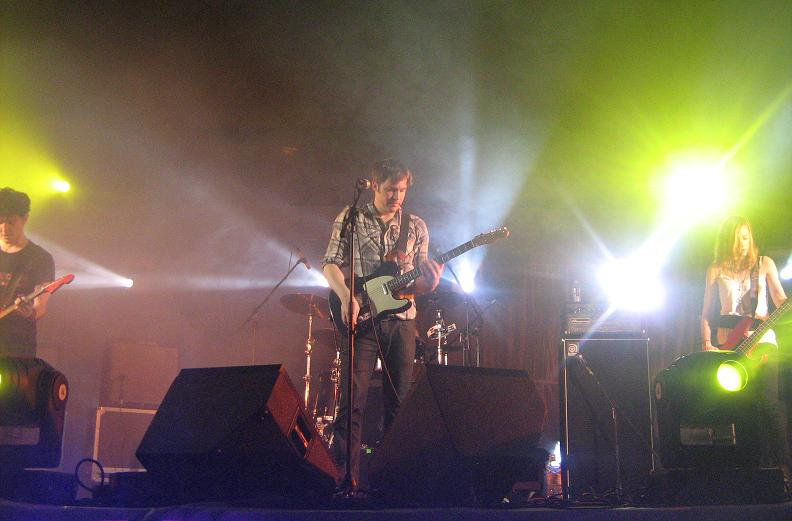
Christensen performing in Mexico City, Mexico in April 2008

=== Stellastarr ===
Alongside Tannen, Kremer and the new addition of Michael Jurin - who took up the lead guitar position - Christensen formed the indie rock band Stellastarr, (stylized as "stellastarr*), in March 2000. In July, the band had their debut performance with Christensen's original compositions at Luna Lounge on Manhattan's Lower East Side. In May 2003, Stellastarr signed with RCA Records, allowing for them to focus on their musical careers. Under the RCA label, Stellastarr released an eponymous album in September 2003, featuring the standout singles "Jenny" and "My Coco".

Stellastarr released Harmonies for the Haunted, their second album under RCA, on September 13, 2005. Christensen's progression as a singer was praised, with his tone being noted for having matured and become more consistent beyond his shifting between falsetto and baritone vocal registers. Stellastarr released their final album, Civilized, through their personal imprint label Bloated Wife Records, in July 2009. Christensen was complimented for his range being able to deliver deep bellows and high falsettos. Following the release of Civilized, Stellastarr unofficially went on hiatus.

=== Filmmaking ===
While Stellastarr was on the Hot Fuss Tour alongside the Killers in 2004, Christensen collaborated with Jason Dolan on a feature-length spec script for a drama called Sidney Hall - he shared it with Paul Wesley, who presented it to William Morris Endeavor, resulting in the signing of both screenwriters. Christensen and Dolan further collaborated on other spec scripts during the mid-2000s, including a psychological thriller called Enter Nowhere. Christensen independently penned an Alfred Hitchcock-inspired thriller, Abduction, and a science-fiction drama, The Karma Coalition. The screenplays for Sidney Hall and The Karma Coalition were sold in 2008, to Scott Free Productions and Warner Bros., respectively.

After a week-long bidding war in February 2010, Lionsgate Films acquired the screenplay for Abduction, with actor Taylor Lautner attached. Jeffrey Nachmanoff rewrote the screenplay and the film began production the following July. In 2011, Jack Heller directed Enter Nowhere, with Christensen & Dolan credited as executive producers. It was acquired by Lionsgate for a direct-to-DVD release, prior to its October premiere at the Screamfest Horror Film Festival.

Disillusioned from studios retrofitting his screenplays, Christensen rebooted his filmmaking career, to focus on directing. He wrote a screenplay in 2011 for a short film for him to direct and co-star in called Curfew. Two days prior to shooting a dance scene, negotiations with the artists behind the accompanying song failed, leading to the filming of cast members dancing to the original song, while Christensen composed a single, "Sophia So Far", to replace it. For two weeks, editor Evan Henke edited Curfew, before Christensen took over and edited the film on his MacBook Pro in his living room for the rest of 2011. Curfew premiered at the Clermont-Ferrand International Short Film Festival in January 2012, to critical acclaim, numerous festival screenings and awards for Christensen's acting, directing and writing. At the 85th Academy Awards, Curfew won the Academy Award for Best Live Action Short Film.

Prior to Curfew's success, Paul Wesley took an interest in the short film and together with Christensen and his producing partner, Damon Russell, collaborated to develop a feature-length adaptation. The film, titled Before I Disappear, premiered at South by Southwest on March 10, 2014, and won the audience award for Best Narrative Feature. Before I Disappear went on to have a successful festival run, with distinctions including an official selection at the 71st Venice International Film Festival. IFC Films was announced to have acquired the North American distribution rights for Before I Disappear in August 2014 and the film was released on video on demand, concurrent with a limited theatrical release the following November.

Per the Writers Guild of America, East Separated Rights, the rights to Sidney Hall reverted to Christensen in 2014, after five years of no development. Christensen opted to independently produce it through Jonathan Schwartz's Super Crispy Entertainment banner, as well as his own Fuzzy Logic Pictures banner. The film premiered at the 2017 Sundance Film Festival, in Park City, Utah. Sidney Hall was acquired for distribution by A24 and DirecTV in April 2017, with DirecTV providing an exclusive pre-release prior to its theatrical release. The film, re-titled The Vanishing of Sidney Hall, was released in theaters on March 2, 2018.

=== Podcasting ===
Christensen expanded his direction efforts to fiction podcasts with Blackout, the first series produced by QCode that was released in March 2019, starring Rami Malek. The first season directed by Christensen was popular, having been downloaded over twelve million times by the time its second season was ordered. Christensen directed the narrative thriller Hunted, the first podcast produced by Wolf Entertainment's Endeavor Audio division, starring Parker Posey, released in November 2019. Alongside Gabriel Mason, Christensen founded an entertainment label called Criminal Content in 2020. Christensen directed, executive produced and acted in the company's debut podcast, American Hostage, an eight-part dramatization of the 1977 Indianapolis hostage crisis perpetrated by Tony Kiritsis. Starring Jon Hamm, American Hostage was released in February 2022. Criminal Content's sophomore historical-fiction series about the Fox sisters and starring Carey Mulligan, The Foxes of Hydesville, was announced in April 2023, with a spring release date.

== Works ==
=== Discography ===
Studio albums

- Stellastarr (September 23, 2003) – Stellastarr
- Harmonies for the Haunted (September 13, 2005 US; March 6, 2006 UK) – Stellastarr
- Civilized (July 7, 2009) – Stellastarr

EPs

- Somewhere Across Forever (May 19, 2002 UK; December 2002 US) – Stellastarr

Singles

- "Jenny" (September 15, 2003) – Stellastarr
- "My Coco" (August 3, 2004) – Stellastarr
- "Sweet Troubled Soul" (September 2005 US; February 27, 2006 UK) – Stellastarr
- "Graffiti Eyes" (April 20, 2009 US) – Stellastarr
- "Numbers" (December 1, 2009 US) – Stellastarr
- "Sophia So Far" (April 23, 2013) – Goodnight Radio

=== Filmography ===
Year	Title	Director	Producer	Writer	Editor	Actor	Role	Notes
2006	Walter King	Yes	Yes	Yes		Yes	Teddy	Short film
2006	Overthrow the Totems					Yes	Aaron	Short film
2006	Missing Girl					Yes	Chad	Short film
2007	Black on Black					Yes		Short film
2011	Brink	Yes	Yes	Yes	Yes			Short film, cinematographer
2011	Abduction			Yes				
2011	Enter Nowhere		Yes	Yes				Performer ("My Coco")
2012	Curfew	Yes		Yes	Yes	Yes	Richie	Short film, performer ("Sophia So Far")
2013	The Bicycle					Yes	Owner	Short film
2013	Grandma's Not a Toaster			Yes		Yes	Arnie	Short film
2014	Before I Disappear	Yes	Yes	Yes	Yes (Note: Uncredited.)	Yes	Richie	Performer ("Sophia So Far")
2014	Mad as Hell		Yes					
2016	Cul-de-Sac		Yes	Yes		Yes	Dad	Short film
2017	The Vanishing of Sidney Hall	Yes	Yes	Yes	Yes			
2019	The Helping Hand		Yes					Short film
2024	Abel		Yes					Short film
2025	Drink & Be Merry					Yes	David Culhain	

=== Narrative podcasts ===
Year	Title	Director	Producer	Writer	Editor	Actor	Role	Notes
2019	Blackout	Yes			Yes	Yes	Pilot (2 episodes)	8 episodes
2019	Hunted	Yes						8 episodes
2022	American Hostage	Yes	Yes		Yes	Yes	Mark (2 episodes), News Anchor (1 episode)	8 episodes
2023	The Foxes of Hydesville	Yes	Yes	Yes				9 episodes
