= Anything Is Possible (film) =

- Directed by: Demetrius Navarro
- Written by: Carlos R. Bermúdez; Demetrius Navarro
- Starring: Ethan Bortnick; Fatima Ptacek; Johnathan Bennett; Lacey Chabert
- Cinematography: Keith L. Smith
- Edited by: Andrew Brzozowski; Jon Vasquez
- Music by: Ethan Bortnick
- Production companies: D Street Films; Nu Trend Productions
- Distributed by: Moviemax Family
- Release date: September 24, 2013
- Running time: 93 minutes
- Country: United States
- Language: English

Anything Is Possible is an American drama film written and directed by Demetrius Navarro. The film was released on September 24, 2013. Ethan Bortnick stars in the leading role as Nathan, a young boy who is separated from his mother when she goes missing during a trip to Japan to provide aid after the tsunami.

The film explores homelessness, military family life and adoption. Bortnick co-wrote the film's music with producer Gary Baker. He recorded the soundtrack album for the film in Muscle Shoals, Alabama, making him the youngest actor to co-write a soundtrack and play the leading role in a feature film.

== Plot ==
Nathan is devastated to hear that his mother, Army lieutenant Margaret Peters, is missing after a rescue mission in Japan. Back in Detroit, this news comes as a shock to him and he struggles to come to terms with it. To make matters worse he discovers his father, George, isn't his biological father. Because of this and his mother's long absence, Child Care Services comes knocking at their door. Afraid of being taken away, Nathan flees before his father can explain. As George goes looking for him, Nathan takes to the streets of Detroit, where he encounters Captain Miles, a homeless Iraq War veteran. At first, it's unclear what Captain Miles' intention is with Nathan, but the veteran ultimately tricks him into seeking shelter at the home of Evelyn Strasser. Evelyn, a philanthropist, finds out that her daughter Jesse has been hiding Nathan in the basement. Evelyn eventually reunites Nathan with George, but not before discovering that Nathan is a musical prodigy. Unfortunately, their reunion is short-lived, as Child Care Services tells the state to take custody of Nathan and send him to an orphanage. The orphanage, however, is not without its own problems, and is soon to be closed soon due to a lack of funds. When the other children in the orphanage learn of this, they decide to raise funds by hosting a concert. They promote the concert with Nathan as a newly discovered musical prodigy via flyers that promise a sterling performance. At the concert, Nathan delivers a successful performance and helps raise enough funds to keep the orphanage afloat. Afterwards, Nathan's mother turns out to still be alive, and is happily reunited with her family.

== Cast ==
Actor	Role
Ethan Bortnick	Nathan
Johnathan Bennett	George
Lacey Chabert	Maggie
Fatima Ptacek	Jessee
David Haines	Captain Miles
Erlinda Navarro	Lysandra (as Erlinda Orozco)
Kym Whitley	Ms. Kim
Elizabeth Atkins	Evelyn
Shelby Moffett	Ms. Jones
Carlo Lorenzo Garcia	Mr. Cruz
Nathan Bortnick	Scooter
Alexander T. Bowman	Jimmy
Frankie Darcel	Herself
Shariay Gant	Jasmine
Daniel Luján	Earl
Sydney Machesky	Becky
Mila McConaughey	Nicole
Meghan Miles	Jenny
Enrico Natale	Clank
Demetrius Navarro	Luis
Stephane Nicoli	Cab driver
Chad Mitchell Rodgers	Tyler
Tasha Tacosa	Joyce Miner
Charles E. Wasson	Tommy

== Reception ==
One critic gave the film three stars, finding it to be a solid film. The Dove Foundation gave the film five Doves, their highest rating. They also stated that Young Ethan Bortnick is similar to Nathan in terms of his capabilities as a child prodigy.

Fatima Ptacek was nominated for Best Child Actor in a Film in the 2014 Nollywood and African Film Critics Awards.
