= List of Dora and Friends: Into the City! episodes =

The following is an episode list for the Nickelodeon animated television series Dora and Friends: Into the City! The show debuted on August 18, 2014 and ended on February 5, 2017. It aired on Nickelodeon as part of its Nick Jr. block.

On October 9, 2014, Nickelodeon renewed the series for a 20-episode second and final season, which aired from September 10, 2015 until February 5, 2017.

== Series overview ==
Season	Episodes	Originally released	
Season	Episodes	First released	Last released
Pilot		August 7, 2011	
1	20	August 18, 2014	February 5, 2016
2	20	September 10, 2015	February 5, 2017

== Episodes ==
=== Pilot (2011) ===
Title	Directed by	Written by	Storyboard by	Original release date
"Dora's Explorer Girls: Our First Concert"	Henry Lenardin-Madden	Chris Gifford	Dan Fausett, Llyn Hunter, Gloria Jenkins, Ken Laramay, Roy Meurin, Melissa Suber, Clint Taylor, and Rossen Varbanov	August 7, 2011
Ten-year-old Dora is growing up in the city of Puerto Verde, and is very excited because she and her new friends—Emma, Naiya, Kate, and Alana, the Explorer Girls—are going to see Shakira in concert. But just before the big event, Alana accidentally donates her blue soccer jacket with their five concert tickets still inside. The tickets were tucked away in an envelope marked with the first letter of each girl’s name. Now, Dora and her friends need to search around the city and recover the missing tickets before showtime. Will they find all five tickets in time for their first concert?

=== Season 1 (2014–2016) ===
No. overall	No. in season	Title	Directed by	Written by	Storyboarded by	Original release date	Prod. code	U.S. viewers (millions)
1	1	"Doggie Day"	Allan Jacobsen	Jorge Aguirre	Kathy Carr, Butch Datuin, Carol Datuin, Enrico Vilbar Santana, and Clint Taylor	August 18, 2014	101	1.50
Dora hopes to shoot a video to help Alana promote the animal shelter's Doggie Adoption Day, and an adventure unfolds to help a dog named Cuzco find and get his lost puppy brothers to the shelter. Cuzco says he hopes his friends will be back, and the mascot of the adoption day is Kate. Words in Spanish: Tranquilo, perrito - calm down, doggy, Salta - jump, Nube - cloud
2	2	"We Saved a Pirate Ship"	Allan Jacobsen	Chris Gifford	Kathy Carr, Butch Datuin, Carol Datuin, Enrico Vilbar Santana and Clint Taylor	August 22, 2014	104	1.29
Dora and her pals fight off treasure-seeking pirates to obtain an old ship needed for the Pirate Festival. Dora wants to be a pirate.
3	3	"The Royal Ball"	George Chialtas and Allan Jacobsen	Dana Chan	Kathy Carr, Butch Datuin, Rick Ritter, Janice Tolentino and Atoy Valencia	August 26, 2014	107	N/A
Dora and her pals help a box get to a princess. So that they can dance.
4	4	"The Magic Ring"	George Chialtas	Valerie Walsh Valdes	Kathy Carr, Butch Datuin, Carol Datuin, Enrico Vilbar Santana, Clint Taylor, and Atoy Valencia	August 28, 2014	102	1.22
When Pablo discovers a magical ring, he puts it on and magically shrinks to a tiny size. To break the spell, Dora, Naiya, and Pablo must travel back to ancient times and return the ring to Princess Xochitl, but they'll have to watch out for the greedy wizard.
5	5	"Dance Party"	George Chialtas	Chris Gifford	Kathy Carr, Butch Datuin, Enrico Vilbar Santana, Clint Taylor and Atoy Valencia	September 4, 2014	103	N/A
Dora, Alana, and Pablo travel to the dancing town of Baila to help their new friend Celia. After Celia accidentally stubs her toe while dancing on her birthday, her father—the Mayor of Baila—decides to ban dancing throughout the town because he thinks it’s too dangerous. Dora and her friends set out to show the mayor that dancing can be fun and safe.
6	6	"Magic Land!"	George Chialtas and Allan Jacobsen	Dustin Ferrer	Rick Ritter, Enrico Vilbar Santana, Clint Taylor, Janice Tolentino and Atoy Valencia	September 11, 2014	108	N/A
Dora and Pablo must get the magic hat back to magic land from a magician named Victor. They wanna get the magic hat for the rabbit.
7	7	"Dora Saves Opera Land!"	George Chialtas	Chris Gifford	Kathy Carr, Carol Datuin, Enrico Vilbar Santana, Clint Taylor and Atoy Valencia	September 18, 2014	106	N/A
Dora, Emma, and Pablo must defeat La Diva (voiced by Megan Hilty) to get the music back to Opera Land. She really wants to take over the whole kingdom.
8	8	"Puppet Theater"	George Chialtas and Allan Jacobsen	Valerie Walsh Valdes	Kathy Carr, Butch Datuin, Rick Ritter, Robert Souza and Atoy Valencia	October 2, 2014	109	N/A
Dora and Kate go to a world of puppets and they help the three little pigs' brother finish building his brick house before the big bad wolf gets there and blows it down. The story was called “Three Little Pigs.”
9	9	"The Search for Mono"	Allan Jacobsen	Chris Gifford	Kathy Carr, Butch Datuin, Enrico Vilbar Santana, and Clint Taylor	January 15, 2015	105	1.13
Dora, Pablo, and Kate travel to a magical train station to find Miguel's lost toy monkey before his bedtime. He wants it.
10	10	"Mystery of the Magic Horses"	Allan Jacobsen	Valerie Walsh Valdes	Butch Datuin, Enrico Vilbar Santana, Robert Souza, Clint Taylor, Ysty Veluz, and Atoy Valencia	November 24, 2014	111	N/A
Dora, Naiya, Alana, and her cousin Marco have to outsmart four bandits trying to steal five horses in order to return them to the city farm.
11	11	"Buddy Race"	George Chialtas	Valerie Walsh Valdes	Rick Ritter, Enrico Vilbar Santana, Clint Taylor and Janice Tolentino	February 13, 2015	113	N/A
Alana twists her ankle and cannot run with Dora in a buddy race, so Pablo, Emma, Naiya, and Kate team up with Dora in the race to raise enough money to repair the playground for the kids. She said no because she never wants to have fun at the race with (Dora, Niaya, Pablo, Emma and Kate) because it is hard for her to race with Dora.
12	12	"Magical Mermaid Adventure"	Allan Jacobsen	Jorge Aguirre	Butch Datuin, Carol Datuin, Angela Gilman, Rick Ritter, Enrico Vilbar Santana, Jim Shellhorn and Atoy Valencia	March 20, 2015	112	1.36
Dora and her friends transform into mermaids to help her mermaid friend Mariana stop a mean mermaid from stealing all the gold in Mermaid Kingdom. So that she can save everyone's gold.
13 14	13–14	"Puppy Princess Rescue"	George Chialtas, Allan Jacobsen and Elizabeth Kwon	Jorge Aguirre	Kathy Carr, Butch Datuin, Carol Datuin, Elsa Garagarza, Rick Ritter, Enrico Vilbar Santana, Robert Souza, Clint Taylor, Janice Tolentino and Atoy Valencia	May 15, 2015	118 119	N/A
When the Puppy Princess is taken, Dora and her friends plot a plan to save her and have to deal with the canines and cranky cats. That the Princess Puppy is not wanting to be a part of the castle of pets.
15	15	"We Saved the Music"	Allan Jacobsen	Craig Shemin	Kathy Carr, Carol Datuin, Butch Datuin, Rick Ritter, Robert Souza, Clint Taylor, Janice Tolentino, and Atoy Valencia	June 12, 2015	120	N/A
Dora and her friends form a pop band for a charity concert, but just before their performance, one of Dora's guitar strings snaps. Dora, Emma, and Pablo travel to Music Land, where they must bring Dora's guitar and three other broken instruments to Mamá Música so they can all be fixed before the concert.
16	16	"S'more Camping"	George Chialtas	Chris Gifford	Kathy Carr, Butch Datuin, Elsa Garagarza, Rick Ritter, Clint Taylor and Atoy Valencia	June 19, 2015	117	N/A
Dora and her friends embark on an enchanting adventure. But when Pablo sees that his marshmallows are gone, Pinenut (a wish-granter) tells that she is the fairy of Fairyville (Emma and Kate are the only ones who stay camping), but one of the dragons of Fairyville has a stomach ache.
17	17	"Dora in Clock Land"	Henry Lenardin-Madden	Jorge Aguirre	Rick Ritter, Enrico Vilbar Santana, Jim Shellhorn, Clint Taylor, Janice Tolentino and Ysty Veluz	September 8, 2015	110	N/A
Dora and her friends embark to clock land to repair a clock as soon as possible, so they can do great on their music.
18	18	"Trick or Treat"	George Chialtas	Melinda LaRose	Carol Datuin, Rick Ritter, Clint Taylor and Ysty Veluz	October 23, 2015	116	0.84
On Halloween night, Dora and her friends go trick-or-treating when Emma, dressed as a puppy, accidentally scares Abuela's cat away. As they search for the missing cat, they must also save a monster Halloween party from a jealous witch who mistakenly believes she wasn't invited.
19 20	19–20	"Dragon in the School!"	George Chialtas, Allan Jacobsen and Elizabeth Kwon	Chris Gifford	Kathy Carr, Butch Datuin, Carol Datuin, Elsa Garagarza, Rick Ritter, Enrico Vilbar Santana, Robert Souza, Clint Taylor, Janice Tolentino and Atoy Valencia	February 5, 2016 (Note: This episode was first released in Dora and Friends: Season 1 DVD on December 8, 2015.)	114 115	0.92
After finding a lost baby dragon, Dora decides to care for it until she can return him to Dragon Island. Special guest star - Prince Royce as the Wizard

=== Season 2 (2015–2017) ===
No. overall	No. in season	Title	Directed by	Written by	Storyboarded by	Original release date	Prod. code	U.S. viewers (millions)
21	1	"Kate's Book"	Elizabeth Kwon	Kim Duran	Kathy Carr, Butch Datuin, Elsa Garagarza, Robert Souza, Clint Taylor, and Atoy Valencia	September 10, 2015	201	0.59
Kate's book is stolen by a pirate named Antonio el Aventurero, so Dora and her friends must save her book.
22	2	"Return to the Rainforest"	George Chialtas, Allan Jacobsen, and Henry Lenardin-Madden	Chris Gifford	Butch Datuin, Carol Delmindo Datuin, and Enrico Vilbar Santana	September 18, 2015	204	0.94
Dora's city friends travel back to the rainforest with Boots so that they can rescue Backpack and Map after they are swiped by Swiper.
23	3	"The Ballerina and the Troll Prince"	George Chialtas and Allan Jacobsen	Chris Gifford	Butch Datuin, Carol Delmindo Datuin, Dan Fausett, Enrico Vilbar Santana, and Janice Tolentino	November 6, 2015	209	1.01
Dora and her friends put on a ballet about a ballerina who rescues three dancers and breaks a spell on a troll prince.
24	4	"Community Garden"	George Chialtas	Jessica Lopez	Carol Delmindo Datuin, Rick Ritter, Robert Souza, Clint Taylor, Atoy Valencia, and Ysty Veluz	November 16, 2015	202	0.69
Dora and her friends visit a magical garden world.
25	5	"Coconut Cumpleaños"	George Chialtas and Allan Jacobsen	Dustin Ferrer	Kathy Carr, Elsa Garagarza, Enrico Vilbar Santana, Clint Taylor, and Atoy Valencia	November 18, 2015	203	0.60
Dora and her friends must catch a runaway coconut, as it is needed for Pablo's birthday.
26 27	6 7	"Dora's Rainforest Reunion" (Note: This special is composed of three episodes: "Return to Rainbow Rock," "A Swiper Emergency," and "Magical Night Circus")	Return to Rainbow Rock, A Swiper Emergency; Elizabeth Kwon, Henry Lenardin-Madden, and Enrico Vilbar Santana; Magical Night Circus; George Chialtas and Allan Jacobsen	Return to Rainbow Rock; Chris Gifford; A Swiper Emergency, Magical Night Circus; Valerie Walsh Valdes	Return to Rainbow Rock, A Swiper Emergency; Kathy Carr, Butch Datuin, Anthony Koteh, Edemer Santos, Clint Taylor, and Atoy Valencia; Magical Night Circus; Kathy Carr, Butch Datuin, Carol Delmindo Datuin, Rick Ritter, Clint Taylor, Janice Tolentino, and Atoy Valencia	November 25, 2015	206 207	1.67
In "Return to Rainbow Rock," Dora returns to the rainforest for a picnic with Boots. In "A Swiper Emergency," Swiper gets tangled in his new swiping spring; In "Night Circus," Dora is transported to a magical night circus when she watches the class pet.
28	8	"Kite Day"	Elizabeth Kwon	Bernie Ancheta	Kathy Carr, Butch Datuin, Carol Delmindo Datuin, Elsa Garagarza, Anthony Koteh, Rick Ritter, Clint Taylor, and Ysty Veluz	November 20, 2015	210	0.56
Dora and her friends must catch a kite.
29	9	"Gymnastics Tournament of Light"	Elizabeth Kwon, Henry Lenardin-Madden, and Enrico Vilbar Santana	Dana Chan	Kathy Carr, Elsa Garagarza, Anthony Koteh, Rick Ritter, Enrico Vilbar Santana, Robert Souza, Atoy Valencia, and Ysty Veluz	January 22, 2016	208	1.14
Alana shines the light at the gymnastics tournament.
30	10	"The Princess and the Kate"	Elizabeth Kwon and Enrico Vilbar Santana	Valerie Walsh Valdes	Kathy Carr, Butch Datuin, Carol Delmindo Datuin, Dan Fausett, Elsa Garagarza, Edemer Santos, Robert Souza, Clint Taylor, and Atoy Valencia	January 8, 2016	205	0.78
Kate and Princess Mirabel switch places for a day.
31	11	"Soccer Chef"	Elizabeth Kwon and Enrico Vilbar Santana	Carin Greenberg	Kathy Carr, Butch Datuin, Clint Taylor, and Atoy Valencia	February 8, 2016	211	0.65
Alana does both a soccer game and a bake-a-thon.
32	12	"Emma's Violin"	George Chialtas and Allan Jacobsen	Valerie Walsh Valdes	Carol Delmindo Datuin, Elsa Garagarza, Rick Ritter, Enrico Vilbar Santana, Robert Souza, and Janice Tolentino	February 9, 2016	212	0.66
Emma's violin goes missing.
33	13	"Kate Gives Puppets a Hand"	George Chialtas and Allan Jacobsen	Craig Shemin	Kathy Carr, Clint Taylor, Atoy Valencia, and Edemer Santos	February 10, 2016	213	0.68
Dora and friends must rush to warn of El Giante's arrival.
34	14	"For the Birds"	George Chialtas, Allan Jacobsen, Elizabeth Kwon, and Enrico Vilbar Santana	Craig Shemin	Dan Fausett, Elsa Garagarza, Rick Ritter, Robert Souza, and Ysty Veluz	February 11, 2016	214	0.63
When Emma and a little bird magically switch places, Dora must take them to her cousin Diego in the rainforest to find a way to get them back to normal.
35	15	"The Lost Necklace"	Allan Jacobsen, Elizabeth Kwon, and Enrico Vilbar Santana	Chris Gifford	Butch Datuin, Dan Fausett, Elsa Garagarza, Rick Ritter, Edemer Santos, Robert Souza, Clint Taylor, Janice Tolentino, Atoy Valencia, and Ysty Veluz	September 25, 2016	219	0.42
Dora, Naiya, and Pablo found a necklace and travel back to time in the ancient Playa Verde and to return the necklace back to the queen.
36	16	"Kate and Quackers"	George Chialtas	Dana Chan	Kathy Carr, Butch Datuin, Dan Fausett, Elsa Garagarza, Robert Souza, Clint Taylor, and Atoy Valencia	September 25, 2016	220	0.49
The girls try to keep Kate's pet duck, Quackers, out of trouble when he unexpectedly waddles into camp.
37	17	"A Sockin' Good Party"	Elizabeth Kwon, Henry Lenardin-Madden, and Enrico Vilbar Santana	Chris Gifford	Kathy Carr, Dan Fausett, Elsa Garagarza, Robert Souza, Edemer Santos, Clint Taylor, and Atoy Valencia	November 20, 2016	216	N/A
Dora, Pablo, and Alana travel to the Land of Socks to invite their friends to the party.
38	18	"Alana's Food Truck"	Elizabeth Kwon and Henry Lenardin-Madden	Chris Gifford	Kathy Carr, Butch Datuin, Clint Taylor, Atoy Valencia, and Ysty Veluz	November 20, 2016	218	N/A
Dora and her friends must help a food truck to bring the food to the children. But, Alana can't stay awake!
39	19	"Shivers the Snowman"	George Chialtas and Allan Jacobsen	Valerie Walsh Valdes	Carol Delmindo Datuin, Rick Ritter, Janice Tolentino, Atoy Valencia, and Ysty Veluz	December 4, 2016 (Note: This episode was first released in A Very Nick Jr. Christmas DVD on October 11, 2016.)	217	N/A
Dora and her friends have to help a snowman called Shiver return with Carolina.
40	20	"The Bridge to Caballee"	Elizabeth Kwon and Enrico Vilbar Santana	Chris Gifford	Kathy Carr, Butch Datuin, Carol Delmindo Datuin, Dan Fausett, Rick Ritter, Edemer Santos, Enrico Vilbar Santana, Clint Taylor, Janice Tolentino, and Ysty Veluz	February 5, 2017	215	N/A
Dora and her friends ride magical horses up a rainbow.

== See also ==
- List of Dora the Explorer episodes
- List of Dora the Explorer home media releases
- Dora the Explorer
- Dora and Friends: Into the City!
- Go, Diego, Go!
