= Stellastarr (album) =

Stellastarr*

Studio album by Stellastarr
- Released: September 23, 2003
- Genres: Indie rock; post-punk revival
- Length: 42:35
- Label: RCA
- Producer: Tim O'Heir

Stellastarr chronology
Somewhere Across Forever (2002)	Stellastarr* (2003)	Harmonies for the Haunted (2005)

Professional ratings
Aggregate scores
Source	Rating
Metacritic	78/100
Review scores
Source	Rating
AllMusic	3/5 stars
Alternative Press	5/5
Drowned in Sound	9/10
The Guardian	3/5 stars
Mojo	3/5 stars
Pitchfork	7.4/10
Q	4/5 stars
Rolling Stone	3.5/5 stars
Spin	C
Uncut	4/5 stars

Stellastarr is the self-titled debut album by American indie rock band Stellastarr. It was released on September 23, 2003.

The track "My Coco" appeared on the video game MVP Baseball 2004 and also on the opening credits from the 2011 movie Enter Nowhere (also known as The Haunting of Black Wood), and on the closing credits of the season 2 finale of the Netflix series Special in 2021. "Jenny" appeared on Tony Hawk's Downhill Jam. "Homeland" appeared on NHL 2K8.

== Track listing ==
No.	Title	Length
1.	"In the Walls"	3:49
2.	"Jenny"	4:16
3.	"A Million Reasons"	4:19
4.	"My Coco"	5:05
5.	"No Weather"	3:15
6.	"Moongirl"	5:30
7.	"Somewhere Across Forever"	3:40
8.	"Homeland"	3:55
9.	"Untitled"	5:07
10.	"Pulp Song"	3:39
Total length:		42:35

Japanese edition bonus track
No.	Title	Length
11.	"Arlington Queen"	4:35
Total length:		47:10
