= Stellastarr =

American indie rock band

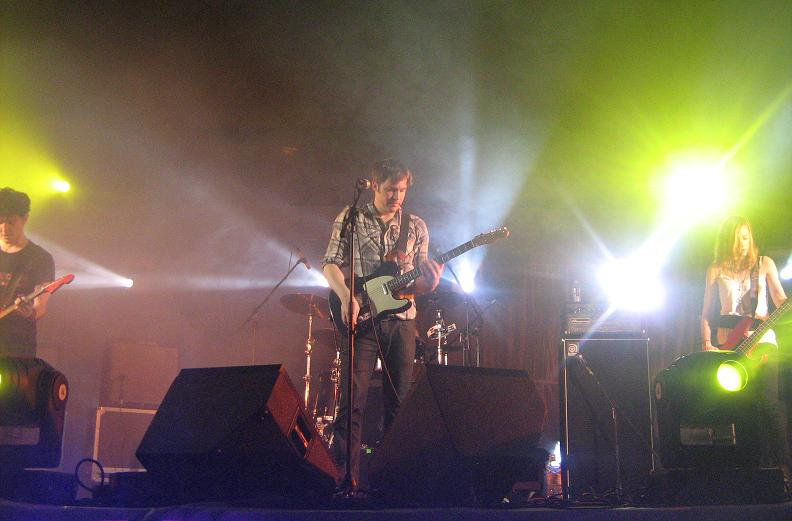
- Stellastarr playing in Mexico

Background information
- Origin: Brooklyn, New York, United States
- Genres: Indie rock, post-punk revival, alternative rock
- Years active: 2000–2009 (hiatus)
- Labels: Tiswas, RCA/Sony, Bloated Wife
- Spinoffs: Cheekface
- Members: Shawn Christensen; Amanda Tannen; Arthur Kremer; Michael Jurin

Stellastarr (styled as stellastarr*) is an American indie rock band based in New York City consisting of Shawn Christensen (vocals, rhythm guitar), Amanda Tannen (bass, vocals), Arthur Kremer (drums, percussion, keyboards), and Michael Jurin (lead guitar, vocals).

== History ==
The band was formed in March 2000 from a previous musical effort, the band Ghistor, formed while studying art and design at the Pratt Institute in Brooklyn. A few years later, after a chance meeting with Jurin, who had recently relocated to Brooklyn and had left his former band Charlotte's Funeral behind in his hometown of Philadelphia, the former classmates reunited, this time with Christensen on vocals. The band was named after an old purple hearse parked in Poughkeepsie, where Christensen grew up.

Stellastarr played its first gig at Luna Lounge, formerly on the Lower East Side of Manhattan in July 2000, and released a limited series of independent/homemade EP CDs shortly thereafter. The band has toured with Jane's Addiction, The Raveonettes, Placebo, The Killers, and Editors. Stellastarr has played live in the United States, the United Kingdom, Canada, Mexico, Japan, and Europe.

The third album, Civilized, was released in July 2009 on the band's own label, Bloated Wife. "Graffiti Eyes" and "Numbers" are the singles, the last one has a B-side that includes "Winter Song". Since the release of the album, the band has been on indefinite hiatus.

The song "My Coco" was featured as a part of the 13-song soundtrack of EA Sports' videogame MVP Baseball 2004.

Members of the band have collaborated with Project Runway winner Christian Siriano and his boyfriend, musician Brad Walsh on music for Siriano's runway shows at fashion week. Michael Jurin played guitar on Walsh's song "Pop" which was the runway music in 2009, and Amanda Tannen contributed vocals to the song "I Got What U Need" on Walsh's 2009 album. Arthur is currently involved in a project titled Dear Comrade, which released its first LP in 2011.

== Other projects ==
All members of the band have alternate careers.

Frontman Shawn Christensen is an Academy Award winning filmmaker having won the Academy Award for Best Live Action Short Film for his 2012 short Curfew at the 85th Academy Awards. Christensen is also a professional painter. His award-winning art has been displayed at various New York exhibits and published in journals like Metropolis and The Village Voice. He painted the portraits inside the album artwork for the group's eponymous debut album.

Bassist Amanda Tannen is a member of the Los Angeles–based band Cheekface, a graphic designer, and created the album art for the third album, Civilized.

Guitarist Michael Jurin is a member of the Philadelphia-based band The Midnight Sounds, creates his own music under the name Piano Belly and has scored various short independent movies.

Drummer Arthur Kremer is a graphic designer, and a founding member of a Brooklyn band called Dear Comrade, and acted in The Lost Battalion.

== Discography ==
=== Albums ===
- Stellastarr (September 23, 2003)
- Harmonies for the Haunted (September 13, 2005, US; March 6, 2006, UK)
- Civilized (July 7, 2009)

=== EPs ===
- Somewhere Across Forever (May 19, 2002, UK; December 2002, US)

=== Singles ===
- "Somewhere Across Forever" (2003)
- "Jenny" (September 15, 2003)
- "My Coco" (August 3, 2004) No. 46 Radio and Records Alternative chart
- "Sweet Troubled Soul" (September 2005, US; February 27, 2006, UK) No. 48 Radio and Records Alternative chart
- "Graffiti Eyes" (April 20, 2009, US)
- "Numbers" (December 1, 2009, US)
