= Dora and Friends: Into the City! =

American animated children's television series and Dora the Explorer sequel

- Also known as: Dora and Friends
- Genre: Adventure
- Created by: Chris Gifford; Valerie Walsh Valdes
- Based on: Dora the Explorer by: Chris Gifford; Valerie Walsh Valdes; Eric Weiner
- Directed by: George Chialtas; Allan Jacobsen; Elizabeth Kwon; Henry Lenardin-Madden
- Voices of: Fátima Ptacek; Eduardo Aristizábal; Mateo Lizcano; Alexandria Suarez; Ashley Earnest; Kayta Thomas; Isabela Moner
- Theme music composer: Matthew Gerrard
- Opening theme: "Dora and Friends, Into the City"
- Ending theme: "Dora and Friends, Into the City" (Instrumental)
- Composers: Peter Lurye; George Noriega; Joel Someillan
- Country of origin: United States
- Original languages: English; Spanish
- No. of seasons: 2
- No. of episodes: 40 (list of episodes)

Production
- Executive producers: Chris Gifford; Valerie Walsh Valdes
- Producers: Marc Amiel (season 1); Holly Gregory (season 1); Mariana Diaz-Wionczak
- Editor: Grace Vanice
- Running time: 24 minutes (regular); 45 minutes (specials)
- Production company: Nickelodeon Animation Studio

Original release
- Network: Nickelodeon (2014-2016); Nick Jr. Channel (2015-2017)
- Release: August 18, 2014 – February 5, 2017

Related
- Dora the Explorer; Go, Diego, Go!; Dora

Dora and Friends: Into the City! (or simply Dora and Friends) is an American animated television series. The sequel to the original Dora the Explorer series, this series premiered on Nickelodeon on August 18, 2014 and ended on February 5, 2017 in the United States, followed by its Canadian premiere on September 6, 2014 on Treehouse TV.

== Premise ==
Dora, who is now a 10-year-old girl, attends school and lives in the city of Playa Verde, California. She has five best friends: Emma (who has a passion for music), Kate (who has a passion for art and theater), Naiya (who is super smart and has a passion for reading), Alana (who has a passion for sports and animals), and Pablo (who has a passion for soccer and having fun). Together, Dora and her best friends work together and go on adventures while discovering the secrets of their city. She is the leader of the Explorer Girls. Dora has a magical charm bracelet that helps her get through objects in the way and a smartphone, complete with an app version of the previous series' Map, to aid her.

The characters are all bilingual; they are able to speak Spanish in addition to English. However, the Spanish curriculum on Dora and Friends has been expanded to using simple phrases and commands as opposed to solely the single Spanish words used on Dora the Explorer.

Season two features the return of characters from the original series such as Boots the Monkey, Benny the Bull, Isa the Iguana, Tico the Squirrel, Swiper the Fox, and Big Red Chicken who appear as guest stars in certain episodes such as the reunion special "Return to the Rainforest", which involves Dora's return to the rainforest in Mexico to rescue Map and Backpack after they are swiped from Boots by Swiper, only to be carried off by a strong wind. At the end of that episode, Backpack is repaired and redesigned by Kate after Backpack is torn apart by a cliff on Tallest Mountain. The special also introduces a young flower named Bud who lives in Isa's garden and had heard all about Dora's adventures from her. Bud ends up getting sewed up as part Backpack by Kate, though he is perfectly fine with it as he gets to go on adventures with Dora and her best friends. Bud helps Backpack find and retrieve objects stored inside her for Dora.

In addition to Backpack and Bud, Map returns later in the season following the events of "Return to the Rainforest", effectively replacing Dora's map app. In "For the Birds", older versions of Diego, Alicia, Baby Jaguar (who now goes by just "Jaguar"), and the Bobo Brothers from Go, Diego, Go! appear as well. The series had a few guest stars such as Megan Hilty and Christina Milian.

== Characters ==
=== Main characters ===
Dora as depicted in the series

- Dora Márquez – An explorer who formerly resided in the rainforest. She is currently ten years old and lives in the city of Playa Verde.
- Emma – A friend of Dora's, she excels at creating music and singing songs.
- Kate – A friend of Dora's, she is an aspiring artist and performer who enjoys drawing, storytelling, and performing in stage productions.
- Naiya – A friend of Dora's, she is knowledgeable about the history of Playa Verde, pyramids, and stories, and believes there is always a solution.
- Alana – A friend of Dora's, she is proficient in soccer and has a fondness for animals.
- Pablo – A friend of Dora's, he enjoys having fun and is a soccer player alongside Dora and Alana. He is the only male member of Dora's team.

=== Recurring characters ===
- Map App – A digital version of Map on Dora's smartphone. He tells Dora and her best friends which way they had to go and watch out for booby traps.
- Mr. Marquez – Dora, Guillermo, and Isabela's father.
- Mrs. Marquez – Dora, Guillermo, and Isabela's mother. Abuela's daughter.
- Guillermo Marquez – Dora's little brother and Isabela's twin brother.
- Isabela Marquez – Dora's little sister and Guillermo's twin sister.
- Abuela – Dora, Guillermo, and Isabela's grandma. Mrs. Marquez's mother.
- Mariana - A mermaid who lives near the coast.
- Lucky – Abuela's cat.
- Perrito – Dora's dog.
- Boots – He's a monkey and Dora's best friend in the rainforest.
- Map – Dora's map. He was rescued by Dora from the big wind when he was swiped by Swiper along with Backpack.
- Backpack – Dora's backpack. She was swiped by Swiper along with Map, and saved by Dora just in time when she falls off the tallest mountain from the big wind. She was torn apart and has been fixed by Kate with bright brand new colors.
- Bud – A little flower who lived in Isa's garden. He heard stories about Dora the Explorer and asked to come along on the adventure to save Backpack and Map. At the end, Bud ends up being sewed on Backpack, he gets to go on adventures with Dora and her friends. He helps Backpack to get supplies out when Dora and her friends need it.
- Tico - Dora's friend at the rainforest. He's a squirrel, he speaks Spanish and English. (Mostly only Spanish)
- Isa - Dora's friend at the rainforest. She's an iguana. She loves working in her garden and is very good with plants.
- Benny - Dora's friend at the rainforest. He's a bull. He loves telling jokes.
- Swiper – He's a fox from the rainforest who swipes everyone's things.
- Big Red Chicken – He's a red chicken from the rainforest.
- The Grumpy Old Troll – A troll who lives under the bridge with his wife Petunia in the rainforest and guards the bridge.
- Tabitha - An orange stuffed cat.
- Oatmeal - A beige teddy bear.
- Piggy - A pink stuffed pig.
- Clownie - A stuffed clown.
- Miguel - A little boy who lost his toy monkey Mono.
- Mono - Miguel’s brown stuffed monkey.
- Celia - A passionate girl who loves to dance from the city of Baila.
- Mayor of Baila - Celia's father.
- Mayor of Playa Verde

== Voices ==
- Fátima Ptacek as Dora, Malencua, Monsters, Los Duendes, Perrito, Dragons, Dragon, Kids, Girl, Crowd, Villagers, Sprite, and Penguins
- Eduardo Aristizabal as Pablo (Season 1), Kids, Ghosts, Cusco, Party Guests, Monkeys, Kids, Jack, and Dwarf
- Mateo Lizcano as Singing Pablo (Season 1 only), Fairy, Sidekick Cat, Doggie Land Dog, Troll Prince, Audience, Crowd, Purple Team, Announcer, Villagers, Sprite, Penguins, and Pablo's Speaking and Singing voices (Season 2)
- Alexandria Suarez as Naiya, Digger, Sidekick Cat, Doggie Land Dog, Musicland Citizens, Kids, Dragons, Alley Cat, Fireflies, Dancer, and Audience
- Ashley Earnest as Alana, Rico, Police Dog, Buddy Team, Little Girl, Party Guests, Kids, Alley Cat, Dancer, Audience, and Party Guest
- Kayta Thomas as Emma, Fairies, Lala, Musicland Citizens, Kids, Crowd, Dancer, Audience, Bird-Emma, and Party Guest
- Isabela Moner as Kate, Kids, Townsfork, Monsters, Fairy, Roja, Doggie Land Dog, Musicland Citizens, Dress Rack, Girl, Queen Bee, Katrin, Princesa Maribel, Purple Team, and Guitarist Elf
- Marc Weiner as Map App, Drawbridge, Firefighter Dog, Doggie Land Dog, Sidekick Bandit, Swiper, Map, Fiesta Trio, and Mean Turtle
- Breanna Lakatos as Isabela (Season 1), Backpack, Ghosts, Brassy, Violeta, Kids, Marisol, Baker Elf, Little Girl Villager, Girl in Classroom, Crowd, Kids, Gnaomi, Hummingbirds, Uno, and Little Kids
- Mia Sanchez as Isabela (Season 2), Guard, and Clowns
- Miguel Cardona as Guillermo, Miguel, Bunny, Puppies, Alley Cat, Piggy, Squeeze, Andrés, Fishy, Bat, Firefighter Monster, Little Boy Villager, Boy in Classroom, Bobby, Caterpillar, Butterfly, Guard, Little Boy, Crowd, Monkey, Musicland Citizens, and Kids
- Julian Rebolledo as Papi (Season 1), Mayor, Referee, Cowboy Monster, Takeaway Truck, Musicland Citizens, Bandit Boss, Bandit, Magicians, Playing Card, Llama, Señor Antonio, Villagers, Baker, and Guard
- Eileen Galindo as Mami (Season 1), Pirate, and Buddy Team
- Leila Colom as Mami (Season 2), Mama Música, Musicland Citizens, Fortune Teller, Magician, Momma Dragon, Young Momma Dragon, Clowns, Queen, Boy's Mama, Crowd, Soccer Coach, Referee, Crowd, and Dulce's Mami
- Miriam Cruz as Abuela and Vendors
- Leslie Valdes as Dragon, Los Duendes, Sr. Chugga Chugga, Kite Judge, El Giante, Bus Driver, Snow Monster, and Dulce's Father
- Chris Gifford as Pirates, Gate, Alarm, Grumpy Old Troll, Big Red Chicken, and Golden Parrot
- Sebastian Arcelus as Pirate Ship, Pirate Captain, Matador, Soldier, Sir Jim, Box, Guards, and Villagers
- David Crommett as Pablo's Abuelo, Older Man, Chocolate Tree, Papi (Season 2), and Audience
- Olivia Coronel as Kitty, Doggie Land Dog, Plink, Mia, Tabitha, Kids, Armadillo, and Lulu
- Jorge Vega as Jorge, Little Boys, Students, Kids, Gingerbread Man, Tico, Squeeky, and Party Guest
- Koda Gursoy as Pinguino, Kids, Piggy, Boots, Gnorman, Jaguar, Rainforest Animals, Sprite, and Mo the Sock Monkey
- Aidan Gemme as Benny, Fireflies, Troll, and Little Kids
- Celine Cardona as Isa, Kids, Sara (Smelly), Party Guest, Carolina, and Clowns
- John Rocco as Bud, Tres, Quackers, Shivers, and Baby Unicorn
- Nicolas Cantu as Diego, Polar Bear, Crocodile, and Clowns
- Franchesca Valdez as Alicia
- Lewis Grosso as Cat Captain, Cusco, Maximo, and Woodworker Elf
- Anthony Pierini as Monkey and Puppies
- Ashton Woerz as Puppies, Boy, Mouse, Bowl of Beans, and Audience
- Sofia Lopez as Littlest Piggy
- Peter Lurye as Frogs, Mice, and Horses
- Jenna Iacono as Bowl of Rice and Girl
- Jamie Cantone as Celia, Puppy Princess, Troll, and Dulce
- Sean Kenin as Wizard, Cat, and Townsfolk
- Adam Sietz as Serpiente
- Eric Campus as Baker, Doggie Land Dog, and Mayor
- Naomi Rosado as Mariana the Mermaid and Penguin Chick
- Evelyn Guaman as Piggy
- William Poon as Clownie
- Sebastian Banes as Oatmeal and Kids
- Paolo Poucel as Miguel's Mommy, Farmer Ana Maria, and Bandit
- Joel Someillan as Berries
- Lewis Grosso as Captain Cat
- Robert Jimenez as Mayor Dog
- Allison Strong as Farmer Dog, Doggie Land Dog, and Villagers
- Olive Valdes as Kids and Crowd
- Violet Valdes as Kids
- Sebastian De Casteja as Marko and Kids
- Sam Mercedes as Sloth
- Raquel Wallace as Princess and Little Girls
- Kiara Marte as June and Little Girls
- Derek Sosa as Mousey and Students
- Jessica Conde as Princess, Students, and La Maestra Carmen
- Sophie Tanabaum as Cukoo Birds
- Asa Seigel as Tick-Tock Train
- Jesus Martinez as Judge and Lightning
- Isabel Galupo as Bicycle Taxi Driver
- Alexia Kohn as Susi, Kids, and Ballerina Elf
- Flora Mendoza as La Maestra Julia, Crowd, and Elf
- Mike Smith Rivera as Marty, Ogre, Mateo, Audience, Elf, and Bruno
- Angela Bennett as Betti and Vendors
- Eric Campos as Mayor, Baker Dog, Doggie Land Dog, and Vendors
- Kyndra Sanchez as June
- Shirley Rumierk as Mati
- Armando Riesco as King, Announcer, Wizard, and Guard
- Annie Kozuch as Tournament Official and Announcer
- Kathleen Herles as Camp Counselor
- George Gabriel as Littlest Bird and Birds
- Alyssa Mazei as Penguin
- Lori Felipe-Barkin as Valerie and Flash
- Candida Guevara as Serena and Eagle

=== Guest stars ===
- Gabe Saporta as Victor
- Megan Hilty as La Diva
- Olga Merediz as Emma's Grandma and Wagnerian Woman
- Raul Esparza as Big Bad Wolf and Coconut King
- Christina Milian as La Sirena Mala
- Diane Guerrero as Pinenut and Fairy
- Prince Royce as Wizard
- Thalía as The Queen

== Episodes ==
Season	Episodes	Originally released	
Season	Episodes	First released	Last released
Pilot		August 7, 2011	
1	20	August 18, 2014	February 5, 2016
2	20	September 10, 2015	February 5, 2017

== Pilot special ==
A 43-minute pilot titled Dora's Explorer Girls: Our First Concert premiered on August 7, 2011. Dora and her friends get five tickets to see Shakira in concert. When they lose them, they have to find them before the concert starts. The special was written by Chris Gifford and directed by Henry Lenardin-Madden.

=== Cast ===
- Stephanie Joy as Dora (speaking voice)
- Karina Padura as Dora (singing voice)
- Jessica Conde as Alana (speaking voice)
- Natali Padura as Alana (singing voice)
- Giselle Monterroso as Emma (speaking voice)
- Jasmine Maslanova-Brown as Emma (singing voice)
- Elly Morillo as Kate (speaking voice)
- Raquel Trinidad as Kate (singing voice)
- Ashley Mendola as Naiya (speaking voice)
- Maria Paula Gonzalez as Naiya (singing voice)
- Pablo Napoli Borrero as Jorge, Second Place Boy, and Crowd
- Miriam Cruz as Abuela and Crowd
- Eileen Galindo as Mami, Truck Driver, and Crowd
- Carlos Ibarra as Donation Clerk, Ticket Taker, and Crowd
- Julian Rebolledo as Señor, Street Fair Barker, and Crowd
- Regan Mizrahi as Boots
- Shakira as Herself

== Production ==
A pilot episode titled Dora's Explorer Girls: Our First Concert aired on August 7, 2011, on Nick Jr. in the United States. One month later, it aired on Treehouse TV in Canada. Following the release of Dora's Explorer Girls: Our First Concert, Nickelodeon announced in 2013 that it would produce a spin-off to Dora the Explorer titled Dora and Friends: Into the City! starring Dora as a 10-year-old who goes on city adventures with a group of new friends. The series has been picked up for 20 episodes and had its prime-time premiere on Nickelodeon on August 18, 2014. The show is animated using Toon Boom Harmony. On October 9, 2014, Nickelodeon renewed the series for a 20-episode second season. Reruns also currently air on the Nick Jr. Channel. The show was canceled on February 5, 2017, after two seasons.

== Broadcast ==
Dora and Friends: Into the City! premiered on Treehouse TV in Canada on September 6, 2014, and on Nick Jr. in the United Kingdom, Ireland, Australia, and New Zealand on November 3, 2014. Channel 5's Milkshake! strand also premiered the show. In Southeast Asia, the series debuted on March 16, 2015, on Nickelodeon in Singapore, and in Spain on Clan TVE. In India, the show airs on Nick HD+. in South Korea, and in Korea on Skylife's Children English Channel Kids Talk Talk Plus, but not in Nickelodeon Korea due to failing of the show's broadcast. This series aired on TVNZ in New Zealand in 2024.

== Merchandise ==
=== DVD releases ===
Nickelodeon produced a number of DVDs based on the show, with Paramount for Region 1; and with Universal / Sony for Region 4.

DVD name	Episodes	Release date
Dora's Explorer Girls: Our First Concert	"Dora's Explorer Girls: Our First Concert" (Pilot)	Region 1: May 15, 2012 June 2/9, 2015 April 21, 2015
Dora and Friends; Dora y Sus Amigos (Region 2 – Spain)	"We save a Pirate Ship!"; "Royal Ball"; "The Magic Ring"; "Dance Party"	Region 1: February 10, 2015 March 15, 2015; Region 2 (Spain): January 15, 2016; Region 2 (UK): April 16, 2007 September 14, 2015 July 4, 2016; Region 4: June 24, 2015 August 5, 2015
Doggie Day!	"Doggie Day"; "Dora Saves Opera Land"; "Puppet Theater"; "Magic Land!"	Region 1: May 10, 2015 August 4, 2015; Region 2 (UK): November 30, 2015; Region 2 (South Africa): November 9, 2015; Region 4: September 30, 2015 September 9, 2016
Dora and Friends: Season 1 (4 DVD Pack)	All episodes from Season 1	Region 1: December 8, 2015 December 14, 2017
Feel the Music ¡Siente la música! (Region 2 – Spain)	"We save the Music"; "Dora in Clock Land"; "Buddy Race"; "The Search for Mono"	Region 2 (Spain): June 8, 2016; Region 2 (South Africa): December 12, 2016; Region 2 (UK): January 16, 2002 February 1 8, 2016; Region 4: March 24, 2016
Magical Mysteries; Misterios mágicos (Region 2 – Spain)	"Dragon in the School"; "Emma's Violin"; "The Ballerina and the Troll Prince"	Region 2 (Spain): September 7, 2016; Region 2 (South Africa): January 9, 2017; Region 2 (UK): September 15, 2016; Region 4: 7/15 September 2016
