= Andrew Napier =

American film director

- Born: Wisconsin, United States
- Education: University of Wisconsin–Madison
- Occupation: Film producer

Andrew Napier was born and raised in Wisconsin, United States, and attended the University of Wisconsin–Madison.

In 2009, after working on Quentin Tarantino's Inglourious Basterds in Berlin, Germany, he moved to Los Angeles, California. Napier was a producer of the 2013 Academy Award®- winning short film Curfew, and later edited its feature adaptation Before I Disappear (SXSW 2014 Audience Award Winner).

His screenplay for Dogtooth, a remake of the Academy Award®-nominated Greek foreign film, is in development at Mandalay Pictures. Napier directed the feature documentary Mad As Hell (Hot Docs 2014 Conscious Media Award Winner), which follows Cenk Uygur, whose online news show The Young Turks has amassed more than two billion views on YouTube.

He also directed the narrative short Grandma's Not A Toaster (Tribeca 2013) and the documentary Mary and Bill (Wisconsin Film Festival 2011 Best Documentary, and nominated at the International Film Festival of Wales). Napier produced and edited The Past is a Grotesque Animal (2014), a documentary about the band "of Montreal", released by Oscilloscope Laboratories, and Bounce: How the Ball Taught the World to Play. He co-produced the romantic comedy Lust For Love (2014), starring Fran Kranz and Dichen Lachman. Napier served as an executive producer for the documentary The Culture High, and the dark comedies The Lord of Catan starring Amy Acker, and Limbo starring H. Jon Benjamin.
