= Cheekface =

American indie rock band

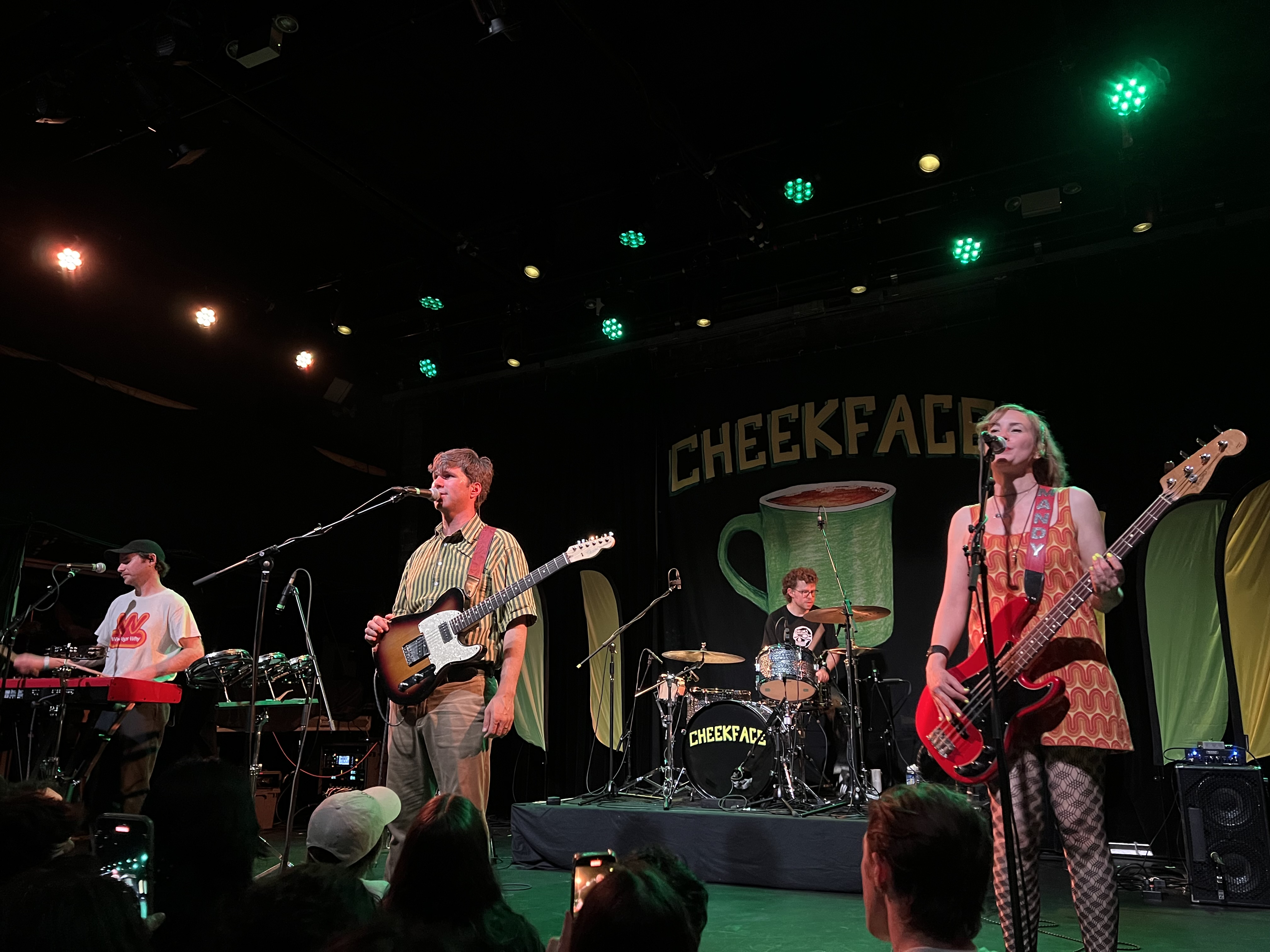
- Cheekface performing in 2024

Background information
- Origin: Los Angeles, California, U.S.
- Genre: Indie rock
- Years active: 2017–present
- Label: New Professor Music
- Members: Greg Katz; Amanda Tannen; Mark Edwards

Cheekface is an American indie rock band based in Los Angeles, California. Formed in 2017, the group consists of guitarist and lead vocalist Greg Katz, bassist and backup vocalist Amanda Tannen, and drummer Mark Edwards. Cheekface has released six studio albums, five EPs, and one live album, all on Katz's own label, New Professor Music.

The group's songs, characterized by Katz's talk-singing, are typically short and lyrics-driven with a dry sense of humor and tend to share a thematic interest in anxiety and sociopolitical unease. Some of Cheekface's fans refer to themselves as Cheek Freaks.

== History ==
Cheekface consists of three members: Greg Katz (guitar), Amanda Tannen (bass), and Mark Edwards (drums). After graduating from the University of California, Los Angeles, during the Great Recession, Katz began working in artists and repertoire for record labels. Katz, who played bass in the band LA Font, lost his job in 2011 and thereafter began his own label, New Professor Music. Tannen, meanwhile, had trained in classical cello in her youth and had played bass with the Brooklyn, New York-based indie rock band Stellastarr in the 2000s. After the band's dissolution, Tannen worked in graphic design and moved to Los Angeles. She was connected with Katz through a graphic design friend who was dating him around 2017, and the pair decided to begin writing songs together.

Cheekface formed in Los Angeles in 2017 with the recruitment of Edwards, with whom Katz was familiar from the city's music scene. Tannen stated that she wanted to "be in a band that is not cool"; the group considered other names before Cheekface including Ryan Gosling's Huge Freakin' Delts and Plumping. Cheekface's first year was dedicated to songwriting; Tannen and Katz described the writing process as attempts to make one another laugh, with lyrics that successfully accomplished this ending up in the songs.

Katz and Tannen wrote what would become the group's breakout single, "Dry Heat/Nice Town" (2018), after attending the 2017 Women's March. The band began to play live in 2018, generally as an opening act. The band did not expect an enthusiastic response to their music. However, in 2019 while playing a set at The Satellite in Los Angeles, Katz was startled when a small group of attendees sang along to every word in one of the band's tracks, temporarily causing him to forget several lines of his own lyrics. After releasing several more singles on Bandcamp in 2018, including "Sexy National Anthem", "Glendale", and "I Only Say I'm Sorry When I'm Wrong Now", the band released their first album, Therapy Island, in March 2019.

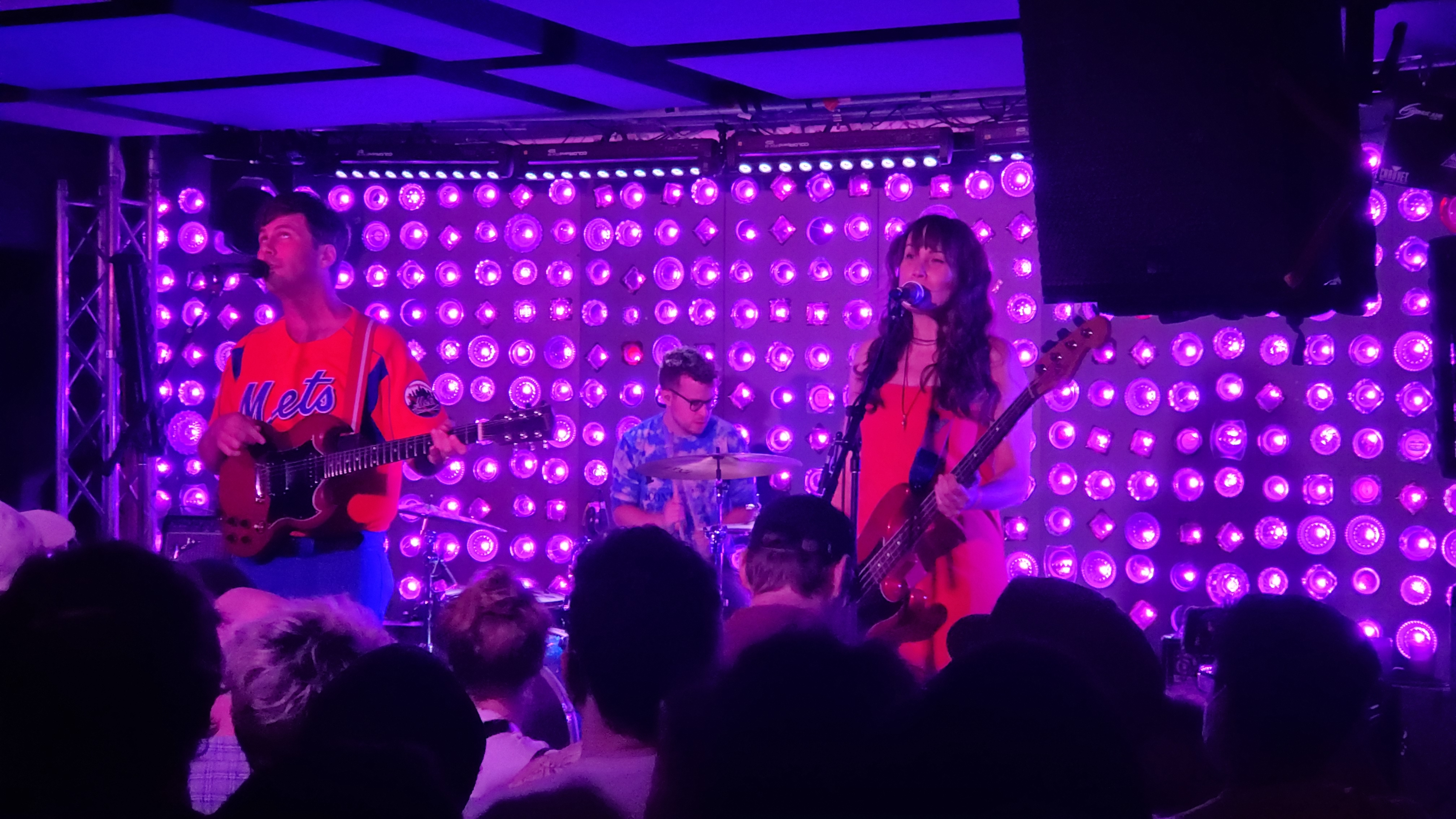
Release show for Too Much to Ask, at which the band's live album was recorded

Amidst the early months of the COVID-19 pandemic in 2020, Cheekface contributed a cover of "That Thing You Do!" to the tribute album Saving for a Custom Van, honoring the track's songwriter, Adam Schlesinger, who died of COVID-19 complications earlier in the year. In January 2021, the band released its second album, Emphatically No., followed by an EP of B-sides from that record, titled Emphatically Mo'. Emphatically No. was listed as one of Paste's 40 best rock albums of 2021.

In August 2022, after teasing the album to fans via postcards, the band released their third album Too Much to Ask. Three months later, they released a second EP of B-sides entitled Don't Ask and in December the band put out an unannounced live album, Live at Baby's All Right, recorded at Brooklyn's Baby's All Right the preceding October.

The band continued to release singles in 2023, beginning in January with "The Fringe". In December of that year, Cheekface announced a 2024 tour of the US and Canada, and followed this up with the surprise release of their fourth album, It's Sorted, in January 2024. A B-Sides EP for It's Sorted, titled Sort Of, was released later that year.

After releasing three more singles in the latter half of 2024 and beginning of 2025, their fifth album, Middle Spoon, was released on February 25th, 2025.

In July 2026, the bands sixth album Podium was released and featured 13 tracks. The band noted that this was their longest album to-date and credited the extra length to giving themselves extra time to work on the tracks before releasing the full record.

Cheekface fashions itself as "America's Local Band" in reference to obscure music projects that are locally beloved but do not reach listeners outside of their music scenes. The band's music is released on Katz's New Professor Music label, with album artwork by Tannen. Cheekface's fans call themselves Cheek Freaks, analogous to Deadheads, fans of the Grateful Dead.

== Musical style and influences ==
Cheekface is an indie rock band. Zach Schonfeld in Alternative Press described their music as lyrics-driven with a dry sense of humor and characterized the group's songs as consisting heavily of one-liners, obscure name-drops, and references to bygone cultural moments. Schonfeld wrote about anxiety and sociopolitical dread being recurring themes in Cheekface's music. The band asks sound technicians at venues they play for "no reverb, no delay, [and] lyrics should be clear". The focus on lyrics over melody conveys a "jittery emotional landscape" that Katz has compared to someone speaking too quickly because they are anxious about something. No songs released on the band's first two albums exceeded four minutes in length.

Cheekface described themselves as being influenced by "great American talk-singers" including Lou Reed, Stephen Malkmus, and Jonathan Richman, as well as by the alternative hip hop group Das Racist. In a 2022 review in Stereogum, Chris Deville compared Katz's singing style to that of Reed and Malkmus, as well as to James Murphy of the band LCD Soundsystem, Travis Morrison of The Dismemberment Plan, Jeff Rosenstock, The B-52's, and Devo.

== Discography ==
=== Studio albums ===
- Therapy Island (2019)
- Emphatically No. (2021)
- Too Much to Ask (2022)
- It's Sorted (2024)
- Middle Spoon (2025)
- Podium (2026)

=== B-sides EPs ===
- Emphatically Mo' (2021)
- Emphatically Noel (2021)
- Don't Ask (2022)
- Sort Of (2024)

=== Live releases ===
- Cheekface on Audiotree Live (2020)
- Live at Baby's All Right (2022)
- Cheekface | Audiotree Far Out (2023)
- Live at The Axis Club in Toronto, May 7 2025 (2025)

=== Singles ===
Year	Title	Album
2018	"Glendale"	Therapy Island
2018	"Dry Heat/Nice Town"	Therapy Island
2018	"I Only Say I'm Sorry When I'm Wrong Now"	Therapy Island
2018	"Sexy National Anthem"	Therapy Island
2018	"S.T.O.P.B.E.L.I.E.V.I.N.G."	Therapy Island
2019	"Eternity Leave"	Therapy Island
2019	"Here I Was"	Therapy Island
2019	"Ballad of Big Nothing" (Elliott Smith cover)	Non-album single
2019	"'Listen to Your Heart.' 'No.'"	Emphatically No.
2019	"Wedding Guests"	Emphatically No.
2019	"No Connection"	Emphatically No.
2020	"Best Life"	Emphatically No.
2020	"Emotional Rent Control"	Emphatically No.
2020	"Big Big Friend"	Emphatically No.
2020	"Reward Points"	Emphatically Mo' (b-sides)
2020	"Walking Contradiction" (Green Day cover)	Jesus Christ Supermarket: A Compilation to Celebrate 25 Years of Green Day's Insomniac
2020	"Lauren" (Rosie Tucker cover)	Non-album single
2021	"We Need a Bigger Dumpster"	Too Much to Ask
2021	"Next to Me (Yo Guy Version)"	Too Much to Ask
2021	"Featured Singer"	Too Much to Ask
2022	"Pledge Drive"	Too Much to Ask
2022	"Ana Ng" (They Might Be Giants cover)	Non-album single
2023	"The Fringe"	It's Sorted
2023	"Popular 2"	It's Sorted
2023	"Plastic"	It's Sorted
2023	"Largest Muscle"	It's Sorted
2023	"(What's So Funny 'Bout) Peace, Love and Understanding" (Brinsley Schwarz cover)	Non-album single
2024	"Flies"	Middle Spoon
2024	"Hard Mode"	Middle Spoon
2025	"Growth Sux"	Middle Spoon
2025	"Sucked Out" (Superdrag cover)	Non-album single
2026	"Hostile Street"	Podium
2026	"Black Site"	Podium
2026	"MFT"	Podium
2026	"I Don't Work Here"	Podium
2026	"No Fly Zone"	Podium
