= Fátima Ptacek =

American actress (born 2000)

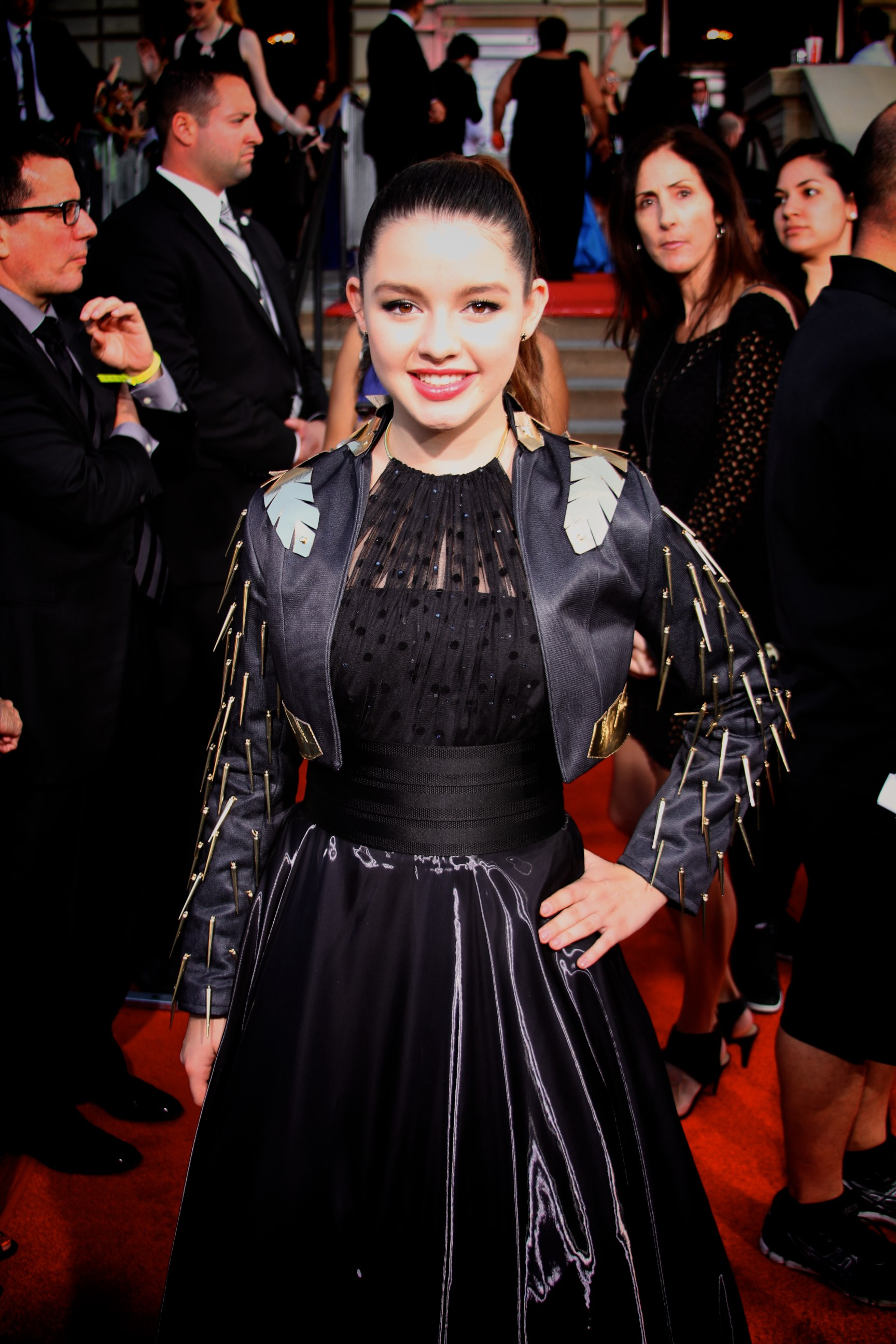
- Ptacek at the 2014 Alma Awards
- Born: August 20, 2000 (age 26); New York City, New York, U.S.
- Occupations: Actress; model
- Years active: 2007–present
- Website: www.fatimaptacek.com

Fátima Ptacek (/pəˈtɑːtʃɛk/; born August 20, 2000) is an American film and television actress and model. A human rights activist working with UN Women's #HeForShe campaign for gender equality, she is best known as the lead actor in the 2012 Academy Award-winning short film Curfew and its 2014 full-length feature film version Before I Disappear. She lent her voice as the lead role of Dora in the Nickelodeon animated television series Dora the Explorer from 2012 to 2019 and Dora and Friends: Into the City! from 2014 to 2017.

== Personal life ==
Ptacek was born and resides in New York City with her parents. Her mother is Ecuadorian. Her father has Colombian, Czech, Irish, and Norwegian roots.

She is a gymnast, competing at United States of America Gymnastics Level 7, and takes part in English equestrian riding; as of 2010, she noted that she was hoping to qualify for the Olympic Games. In 2010, she noted that she was aiming for a scholarship to Harvard or Yale, and was enrolled in an academy for intellectually gifted children. In 2013, she was inducted into the National Junior Honor Society. She has expressed interest in transitioning from acting to a career in law someday. Her childhood dream was to be elected President of the United States; and her remarks led to her being invited to view the New York State Assembly and New York State Senate debate in person. She was acknowledged by Assemblyman Francisco Moya on the floor of the Assembly and recognized for her contributions to the arts. In addition to being fluent in English and Spanish, Ptacek has been studying Mandarin Chinese since childhood. In 2018 she started attending Stanford University.

== Career ==
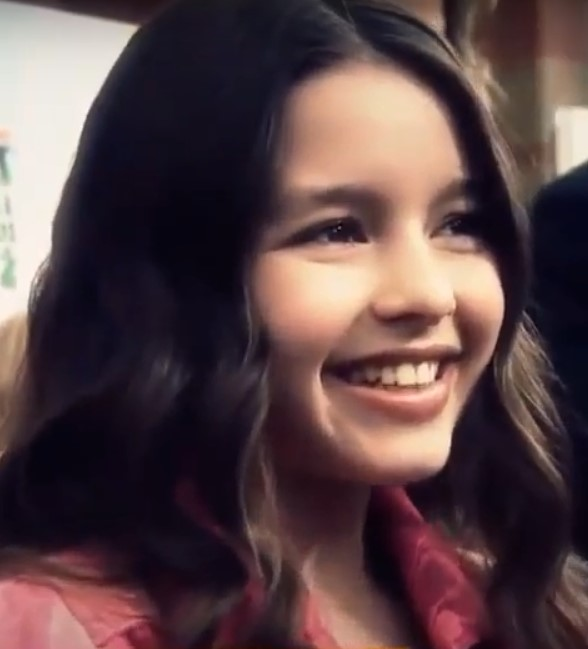
Ptacek in 2012

As a child actress, Ptacek appeared in more than 70 television commercials, (Note: One ad she starred in received an Association of Independent Commercial Producers nomination. (nomination page)) and on the covers of numerous national magazines. She was also one of the few child models who has had the privilege of walking the runway at Bryant Park during the annual Fall Fashion Week in New York City. Discovered by Wilhelmina Models, then represented by New York's Abrams Artists Agency during her child acting and modeling career, the critical acclaim she received for her role in the Oscar-winning film Curfew led to efforts by the "Big Four" talent agencies - Creative Artist Agency (CAA), United Talent Agency (UTA), William Morris Endeavor (WME), and International Creative Management (ICM) - to recruit her, and ultimately, she chose to work with ICM. Ptacek was one of the highest-paid child models in the world, earning approximately $250,000 annually as of 2010, when she had appeared as the "face of" Ralph Lauren, and worked in major campaigns for high end designers like Bonnie Young, Miss Sixty, Monna Lisa, and Siviglia, and fashion houses like Guess, The Gap, H&M, and Benetton. One of her most notable campaigns was for Macy's in 2009, when she revived Natalie Wood's childhood role of "Virginia" in Macy's Yes, Virginia, There is a Santa Claus -themed campaign for the holiday season, which saw Ptacek's appearance in a series of full page advertisements in each of New York's major newspapers, TV commercials with celebrities, such as Donald Trump, Queen Latifah, Martha Stewart, and Carlos Ponce, and public appearances on behalf of Macy's that sought to raise support for the literacy organization, Reading is Fundamental (RIF). She also appeared on the cover of Newsweek.

In 2009, she was cast in the comedy film The Rebound with Catherine Zeta-Jones. After landing small roles in several other films, she was cast in lead roles in several feature films released in 2013 and 2014, including A Little Game, Anything's Possible, Tio Papi, and A Miracle in Spanish Harlem. Ptacek has appeared in television shows including Saturday Night Live, A Gifted Man, Royal Pains, The Beautiful Life, Body of Proof, and appeared with First Lady Michelle Obama on Sesame Street.

"In addition to being a terrific actress, Fatima captures the confidence and warmth that we always look for to play Dora. She sounds like a true leader, but at the same time you know she is a true friend, who will always stop and help."

— Teri Weiss, senior vice president of Nickelodeon Preschool, 2012

Ptacek was given a three-year contract as Dora in Dora the Explorer, in November 2010, with the first new TV episodes with her voice in January 2012. She replaces previous voices Kathleen Herles and Caitlin Sanchez. She notes she was a fan of the character before being cast, amongst 200 girls auditioning. The role earned her a "Best Young Actress - Television" at the 2012 Imagen Awards, which she attended. She is nominated in the 2014 awards for "Outstanding Performance in a Children's TV Series". Specials voiced by Ptacek include Dora Rocks!, Dora's Rescue in Mermaid Kingdom, Dora's Butterfly Ball, Dora's Royal Rescue, Dora's Easter Adventure, and Dora's Fantastic Gymnastics Adventure (2012).

Ptacek starred in the Shawn Christensen short film Curfew (2012) as well as its feature film version Before I Disappear (2014), about a depressed man asked to take care of his niece. Christensen had auditioned a handful of actresses for the role, but saw Ptacek on a morning show appearance. He admits that he hoped she would nail the audition, and describes her as "phenomenal". Receiving extensive critical acclaim, Ptacek's performance was deemed "a breakthrough", "memorable", "charming", an "eerie, mature confidence for someone so young", and "delightfully annoying". The film was nominated for "Best Live Action Short Film" at the 85th Academy Awards, the first time the category was open to all members of the Academy of Motion Picture Arts and Sciences voting. The film won, with Ptacek in attendance. She attended the Vanity Fair Oscar party with Christensen. Ptacek has personally won Best Young Actress at the 2012 Sapporo Short Fest (the film screening there the year after with an appearance by Ptacek), A feature film of the story has been announced, with Ptacek announced to return. Best Actress at the 2013 Rincon International Film Festival, and Best Actress at the 2013 Vaughan Film Festival.

Joey Dedio, screenwriter and top star of the film Tio Papi, in which Ptacek stars, commented in an interview that "we hit the jackpot with that one. She’s a class act, as are her parents." Ptacek was nominated for a "Best Actress/Supporting Actress - Feature Film" Imagen Award, alongside nominees including Elizabeth Rodriguez from the same film; Míriam Colón (Bless Me, Ultima) won the category.

Dora and Friends: Into the City (2014–2017), also has Ptacek as the voice of Dora. While Ptacek speaks in a higher pitch for Dora the Explorer, the new series allows her a more natural voice, as the character is 10 to Ptacek's real life age at the start of production, 12. Production continues on the original series. Producers have allowed Ptacek to modify lines, when she feels she can provide a more accurate version of how youth speak. Ptacek won "Outstanding Performance in a Youth/Children’s TV Series" at the 2015 NAACP Image Awards.

== Charity work ==
Fátima volunteers as a "Celebrity Ambassador" for the Elizabeth Glaser Pediatric AIDS Foundation, and has done work for the Make-A-Wish Foundation in conjunction with the Macy's Believe Campaign, and the Morgan Stanley Children's Hospital. Given her joy of reading, Ptacek has done work with SAG Foundation's BookPALS (Performing Artists for Literacy in Schools), and Reading Is Fundamental. The Latino Commission on AIDS named Ptacek their 2013 youth ambassador at its Cielo Latino benefit gala.

== Selected filmography ==
Year	Film	Role
2008	One Last Beat	Little Girl
2009	Speed Grieving	Lucy
2009	Sweet Flame	Amber's friend
2010	The Rebound	Mozambique Girl
2011	Body of Proof	"Buried Secrets" - Becky Salern
2011	Anything is Possible: The Movie	Jessee
2012–2019	Dora the Explorer	Dora Marquez
2012	Curfew	Sophia
2013	Tio Papi	Angela
2013	Anything is Possible	Jessee
2014	Before I Disappear	Sophia
2014	A Little Game	Isabella
2014–2017	Dora and Friends: Into the City!	Dora
2021	Coast	Abby Evans

== Accolades ==
Year	Award	Category	Work	Result	Ref.
2014	Young Artist Award	Best Performance in a Feature Film - Supporting Young Actress	Tio Papi	Won	
