= A Little Game (2014 film) =

- Directed by: Evan Oppenheimer
- Written by: Evan Oppenheimer
- Produced by: Michael Mailer
- Starring: F. Murray Abraham; Ralph Macchio; Janeane Garofalo; Fatima Ptacek; Oona Laurence; Makenna Ballard; Rachel Dratch; Olympia Dukakis
- Cinematography: Derek McKane
- Edited by: Greg King
- Music by: Peter Lurye
- Production companies: Michael Mailer Films; Black Sand Pictures
- Distributed by: Main Street Films; IPA Asia Pacific
- Release date: April 26, 2014
- Running time: 92 minutes
- Country: United States
- Language: English

A Little Game is a 2014 American family adventure film starring F. Murray Abraham, Ralph Macchio, Janeane Garofalo and Olympia Dukakis.

== Plot ==
The story is about a 10-year-old girl named Max, living in Manhattan whose interaction with a chess-playing retiree teaches her about life and chess simultaneously.

Max goes to a local public school in Lower Manhattan, but her parents feel that she is not being challenged enough. They secure a partial scholarship to get her into a private school on the Upper West Side, meaning her mother, Sarah, has to work longer hours and Max has to take the subway every day.

On the way home after having to join the chess team without knowing how to play, while taking a detour through Washington Square Park, Max sees several people playing chess. The following day she asks Norman, who she had seen alone with a chess board, if he could teach her how to play. He initially discourages her, but her determination wins out.

Over a series of many days, Norman sends her on seemingly meaningless ‘tasks’, like not taking shortcuts to learn about chess. But rather, piece by piece, he describes how they move comparing them to people in the city. He explains Max needs to think creatively and use her imagination. A pawn, like a small cautious child, needs friends by their side to support them. If they slip by unnoticed, they can eventually become a queen and win the game. A chess player has to adjust and change their plans with every move, just like in life.

So, the castle or rook moves only in straight lines, like how people can move in a church, along the aisle or down the rows. Once she has learned how each piece works, he starts her practising how to move them in a certain number of moves each time. She challenges her school rival, which angers Norman because he does not think she is ready. Max wisely says that it is time for her to make her own decisions.

As a final lesson, Norman compares the timing in a chess match to life, that change is inevitable. ‘Enjoy it while it is here’. As she plays against her rival, she watches the other people in the park to remind her and help her with each move. Finally, she is in a position where she is told she can win in three moves, but chooses to forfeit the game and essentially return to her old life and school.

She learns that sometimes ‘an old pizza place closes so that a new one can open’.

== Cast ==
- F. Murray Abraham as Norman Wallach
- Ralph Macchio as Tom Kuftinec
- Janeane Garofalo as Sarah Kuftinec
- Makenna Ballard as Max Kuftinec
- Fatima Ptacek as Isabella
- Oona Laurence as Becky
- Olympia Dukakis as YaYa
- Tovah Feldshuh as Blackstone Head of School
- Rachel Dratch as Aunt Diane
- Kimberly Quinn as Laura
- Frank Pando as Officer

== Reception ==
The film has a 40% rating on Rotten Tomatoes. Renee Schonfeld of Common Sense Media gave the film three stars out of five.
