= Ethan Bortnick =

American musician (born 2000)

- Born: Ethan Jordan Bortnick; December 24, 2000 (age 25); Pembroke Pines, Florida, US
- Genre: Alternative
- Occupations: Pianist; Singer; Songwriter; Record producer; Actor
- Instruments: Piano, Keyboard, Vocals
- Years active: 2003–present
- Labels: Columbia, Sun and Sky Records
- Website: ethanbortnick.com

Ethan Jordan Bortnick (born December 24, 2000) is an American pianist, singer, songwriter, record producer, musician, and actor. His music is known for blending alternative and experimental pop with classical piano. Bortnick has headlined over 1,000 concerts across the globe.

Bortnick's early career saw him featured on The Tonight Show, Oprah Winfrey Network, Good Morning America, Disney Channel, Nickelodeon, and his four award-winning concert specials on PBS. On October 3, 2010, at age nine, Bortnick was listed in the Guinness World Records as the "World's Youngest Solo Musician to Headline His Own Concert Tour".

Bortnick has been featured on national and international television programs. He has helped raise over $50 million for charities, performing alongside Elton John, Beyoncé, and more.

In 2019, Bortnick began releasing original music independently and started posting to social media platforms during the COVID-19 pandemic. He eventually signed with Columbia Records in late 2021, following the release of his single "cut my fingers off."

Since 2021, Bortnick has amassed millions of followers on social media platforms such as TikTok, YouTube, and Instagram. He has headlined two tours (2023, 2024) and performed at multiple music festivals.

== Early life and education ==
Bortnick was born in Pembroke Pines, Florida. His parents, Hannah and Gene Bortnick, are Jewish immigrants from Ukraine. He attended a Montessori pre-school. At three years old, he discovered that he had a set of musical skills, including perfect pitch, on a toy keyboard that eventually led him to appearances on many television shows. He stated he has synesthesia.

== Career ==
=== PBS specials ===
At 9 years old, Bortnick became the youngest artist to have his own National PBS Concert Special The Power of Music. The Power of Music was rated the number-one concert pledge show on public television for 2014–2015.

In 2017, Bortnick presented the third National PBS television concert "Generations of Music," with a guest appearance by Peter Yarrow (of Peter, Paul and Mary), Bethany Yarrow, and Rufus Cappadocia, also guided by musical director David Rosenthal, and directed by Leon Knoles.

Bortnick started his own nationwide talent search called "Celebration of Music" in 2017. The show travels to various cities across the United States and allows contestants between the ages of 4 and 24 a chance to compete to win the opportunity to perform in a national television show.

=== Concert in Las Vegas ===
On July 22 and 23, 2011, at the Las Vegas Hilton, Bortnick became the youngest headliner ever in Las Vegas, at ten years of age.

=== Melody Street ===
Bortnick was the host of Melody Street, a 22-minute musical-variety-show for preschoolers. Bortnick and a band of animated musical instruments (Val Violin, Febe Flute, Timmy Trumpet, Heidi Horn, and Sammy Snare) entertained kids with humor, songs, skits, interactive games, backstage dramas, and celebrity musical guests.

=== Live performances ===
==== 2007 ====
- Opened Nelly Furtado's first US show on her tour, at the Hard Rock Hotel and Casino in Hollywood, Florida.

==== 2008 ====
- Performed a full concert with the Naples, Florida, Philharmonic Orchestra, under the musical direction of Andrew Lane.
- Performed to raise money for the Miami Children's Hospital Foundation's Diamond Ball and Concert, featuring Beyoncé Knowles, Smokey Robinson, and Gloria Gaynor at the American Airlines Arena in Miami, FL. A record US$12 million was raised for the Foundation.

==== 2009 ====
- Performed with the Orlando Philharmonic Orchestra.
- Performed at a fundraiser benefiting the Miami Children's Hospital Foundation with chef Emeril Lagasse.
- Performed at a Parkinson's disease fundraising event hosted by Muhammad Ali
- Performed at a private event for George Davidsohn at the Fontainebleau Hotel backed by members of Billy Joel's band. Bortnick performed with Mark Rivera, Tommy Byrnes, Chuck Burgi, Andy Cichon, and David Rosenthal.
- Performed for the 18th annual Society of Singers Ella Awards, honoring Herb Alpert and Lani Hall.
- Opened for Sir Elton John, Gladys Knight, and Tony Bennett. This event was to raise money for the Starkey Hearing Foundation and was hosted by Billy Crystal.
- Headline performer at the Nokia Theater at LA Live.
- Performed for OneXOne.

==== 2010 ====
- Opened for Jordin Sparks, Jason Derulo, Sam Moore, and David Archuleta for a Super Bowl Party at Miami's Eden Roc Hotel, raising money for various children's charities.
- Performed a solo show at The Grammy Museum for students.
- Performed at the Children Mending Hearts Benefit.
- Performed live at Los Angeles' KCET radio studios during the station's pledge drive.
- Performed at the Delta Awards Ceremony for Children's Miracle Network.
- Performed with Ben Folds and the Nashville Symphony to help raise funds for the Schermerhorn Symphony Center.

==== 2011 ====
- Performed at the Mandalay Bay in Las Vegas to raise money for the Remax and Children's Miracle Network Auction.
- Performed in a concert for the Larry King Foundation. Bortnick opened for Mary J. Blige.
- Opened the 27th National Space Foundation Symposium.
- One of the headliners of the 2011 Jacksonville Jazz Festival. Other headliners included Natalie Cole and Herbie Hancock
- Performed the opening act for Marvin Hamlisch in Montreal, Quebec, Canada.

=== We are the World – 25 for Haiti ===
On February 1, 2010, Bortnick recorded with some 70 artists the song "We Are the World 25 for Haiti". This was the 25th anniversary of the original recording. The song premiered Friday, February 12, 2010, during the opening ceremony of the Vancouver Winter Olympics.

=== Radio/print ===
On February 12, 2010, Bortnick was featured in Rolling Stone in an article titled "Preview the New 'We Are the World', Plus Meet Nine-Year-Old Singer Ethan Bortnick"

On August 1, 2010, Bortnick was featured in the LIFE section of the USA Today.

On May 1, 2011, Bortnick was featured in the Keyboard Magazine In a section entitled "MAJORminor".

On July 22, 2011, Bortnick was featured in the Las Vegas Review-Journal, in the NEON Entertainment section.

In October 2013, Bortnick was on the Esquire Magazine's 80th anniversary cover, titled "The Life of Man"

On November 18, 2013, Bortnick was interviewed for The Flash List, an entertainment Newsletter in the article "Interview with Piano Prodigy Ethan Bortnick"

On November 19, 2013, Bortnick was featured in GAP brand global celebrity ad campaign.

On November 12, 2015, Bortnick was featured in Keyboard Magazine in an article titled "Piano Men Celebrate the Power of Giving" with David Rosenthal.

On August 25, 2017, Bortnick was featured in Broward Family Life, in the entertainment section.

== Discography ==
=== Albums/EP's ===
- Harmonic Minor (2020)
- Luna Park (2024)
- Luna Park (The Lullabies) (2024)

=== DVDs/CDs ===
- Live in Concert "By Me" Ethan Bortnick (2007)
- Ethan Bortnick and His Musical Time Machine (2010)
- Ethan Bortnick in Concert: The Power of Music (2014)

=== Singles ===
- "Leave Me Alone" (2019)
- "Start" (2019)
- "Closure" (2019)
- "I Want Red" (2019)
- "The Dino Club" (2020)
- "100 Layers" (2020)
- "Sink and Die" (2020)
- "Final Boss" (2020)
- "5 am" (2020)
- "Soul Eater" (2021)
- "Cut My Fingers Off" (2021)
- "Prom" (2022)
- "Engravings" (2022)
- "Arsonists" (2022)
- "Happy F***ing Birthday" (2022)
- “Deadly Ever After” (2023)
- “The Last Laugh” (2023)
- “Doppelgänger" (2023)
- "Sleep Paralysis Demon" (2023)
- "Jumpscare In Your Garden" (2024)
- "Hide n Seek" (2024)
- "Rem" (2024)
- "Sprites" (2024)
- "Luna Park" (2024)
- "Violet" (2025)
- "Isn't It Great?" (2025)
- "florida keys" (2025)
- "sunshowers" (2025)

== Tours ==
- 2015 – 2016: The Power of Music
- 2010 – 2011: Musical Time Machine
- 2024: Luna Park Tour

== Television and guesting ==
2015 movie "Anything is Possible" as Nathan

- 2015: Ethan Presents Himself/host
- 2014: The Power of Music Himself/host
- 2010: The Fran Drescher Show Guest/Performer
- 2010: The Wendy Williams Show Guest/Performer
- 2010: Ethan Bortnick and His Musical Time Machine Himself/host
- 2010: Melody Street Himself/host
- 2009 – 2012: Canada AM Guest/Performer
- 2009: Yo Gabba Gabba (Nickelodeon show) Himself/Guest
- 2009: Mornings with Kerri-Anne (Australia) Guest/Performer
- 2008 – 2011: The Oprah Winfrey Show Guest/Performer
- 2008: Little Einsteins on Disney Channel Himself/Guest
- 2007 – 2010: Good Morning America Guest/Performer
- 2007 – 2009: The Tonight Show with Jay Leno Guest/Performer
- 2007: The Martha Stewart Show Guest/Performer
- 2007: Inside Edition Guest/Performer
- 2007: Access Hollywood Guest/Performer
- 2007: The Early Show Guest/Performer

== Reception and accolades ==
By 2024, Bortnick had accumulated more than seven million followers on social media. As of 2024, his Instagram account has over eight hundred thousand followers, his YouTube channel has over one million subscribers, and his Tiktok page has more than four million followers.

== Awards and nominations ==
=== Young Artist Awards ===
Year	Nominee / work	Award	Result
2010	Ethan Bortnick	Outstanding Instrumentalist	Won

Year	Ethan Bortnick	Award	Result
	Ethan Bortnick	Bob Hope award -The Next Generation of Hope	Won

=== Telly Awards ===
Year	Nominee / work	Award	Result
2011	Ethan Bortnick	TV Programs/Segments	Won

=== Other awards ===
On April 1, 2014, Ethan was presented with the Next Generation of Hope Award by the USO.

== See also ==
- List of composers
