= Curfew (2012 film) =

- Promotional poster
- Directed by: Shawn Christensen
- Written by: Shawn Christensen
- Produced by: Damon Russell; Mara Kassin; Andrew Napier
- Starring: Fátima Ptacek; Shawn Christensen; Kim Allen
- Cinematography: Daniel Katz
- Edited by: Shawn Christensen; Evan Henke
- Music by: Darren Morze
- Production company: Fuzzy Logic Pictures
- Release date: May 28, 2012 (Kraków Film Festival)
- Running time: 19 minutes
- Country: United States
- Language: English

Curfew is a 2012 American short film directed by Shawn Christensen. The film won the Oscar for Best Live Action Short Film at the 85th Academy Awards.

The short is the basis for a feature film which premiered at SXSW 2014 titled Before I Disappear.

== Plot ==
Richie is in the process of ending his life in a bathtub when he gets a call from his estranged sister, Maggie, asking him to look after his niece, Sophia, for the night. Richie cancels his plans and sets out to babysit his niece.

When he meets Sophia, she makes it clear that she has no interest in talking to him, nor does she seem to care much about him. Richie mentions that he drew flipbooks when he was younger, starring a protagonist named "Sophia", and that he wonders if his sister got Sophia’s name from those flipbooks. He then takes Sophia to an old rundown building where he used to live, and finds the flipbooks he wants to show her, but Sophia gets scared and wants to go home.

After Richie apologizes, they return to the bowling alley and Sophia starts asking all about his life. They start to become friends, and Richie admits that the reason he hasn't been allowed to see her all these years is because he once dropped Sophia on her head while taking care of her as a baby. Sophia finds this incident amusing, just as her favorite song comes on over the loudspeakers. Suddenly, everyone in the bowling alley seems to be dancing along with the song, except for Richie. Sophia begs him to dance with her, tugging at his arm until his wrist comes out of its sleeve, revealing his suicide attempt. Richie snaps back to reality.

When Richie brings Sophia back home, he notices a restraining order sitting on the kitchen table, citing assault and harassment. His sister comes back looking bruised and she thanks Richie for his help, but she wants him to leave. She doesn’t want her daughter having any more "false idols". Richie tells her how much he looked up to her when they were younger, and how much he still looks up to her now. He returns home to his bathtub, and attempts to continue what he started in the beginning but Maggie interrupts him with a phone call again, this time on nicer terms.

== Awards ==
Awards for Curfew
Year	Association	Award Category	Status
2013	Academy Awards	Best Short Film - Live Action	Won
2013	Prescott Film Festival	Best Narrative Short Film	Won
2013	Cortopolis	Audience Award	Won
2013	Lakecity International Short Film Festival	Best Foreign Film	Won
2013	Hill County Film Festival	Best Short Film	Won
2013	Vaughan Film Festival	Best Short Film	Won
2013	Vaughan Film Festival	Best Actress	Won
2013	Film Caravan	Audience Award	Won
2013	Rincon International Film Festival	Best Actress	Won
2013	Rincon International Film Festival	Best Short Film	Won
2012	Stockholm International Film Festival	Best Short Film	Won
2012	Nashville Film Festival	Best Narrative Short Film	Won
2012	Cleveland International Film Festival	Best Live Action Short Film	Won
2012	Woodstock Film Festival	Best Short Narrative	Won
2012	Clermont-Ferrand International Short Film Festival	Audience Award (International)	Won
2012	Brussels Short Film Festival	Best Actor	Won
2012	Brussels Short Film Festival	Audience Award (International)	Won
2012	Ozu International Film Festival	Grand Jury Prize	Won
2012	Ozu International Film Festival	Audience Award	Won
2012	Sapporo Short Film Festival	Best Young Actress	Won
2012	Sapporo Short Film Festival	Audience Award	Won
2012	Granada International Film Festival	Best International Short Film	Won
2012	Seattle Shorts Film Festival	Grand Jury Prize	Won
2012	Seattle Shorts Film Festival	Best Director	Won
2012	Seattle Shorts Film Festival	Best Actor	Won
2012	Short Shorts Film Festival	Audience Award (International)	Won
2012	Tacoma Film Festival	Best Narrative Short Film	Won
2012	24fps Int'l Short Film Festival	Best Actor	Won
2012	24fps Int'l Short Film Festival	Silver Medal	Won
2012	24fps Int'l Short Film Festival	Audience Award	Won
2012	15 Short Film Festival	Audience Award	Won
2012	Concorto Film Festival	Youth Jury Award	Won
2012	La Boca Del Lobo Int'l Film Festival	Best International Short Film	Won
2012	Soria International Short Film Festival	Best Screenplay	Won
2012	Soria International Short Film Festival	Grand Jury Prize (International)	Won
2012	Soria International Short Film Festival	Audience Award	Won
2012	Soria International Short Film Festival	Youth Jury Award (International)	Won
2012	Windsor International Film Festival	Can-Am People's Choice Award	Won
2012	Williamstown Film Festival	Christopher Reeve Audience Award	Won
2012	Saguenay International Short Film Festival	Creativity Prize	Won
2012	Abitibi-Temiscamingue Int'l Film Festival	Best Short Film	Won
2012	Du Grain a Demoudre Film Festival	Best Short Screenplay	Won
2012	Du Grain a Demoudre Film Festival	Audience Award	Won
2012	Du Grain a Demoudre Film Festival	Young Cinephiles Award	Won
2012	Du Grain a Demoudre Film Festival	Jean Prevost High School Award	Won
2012	Sequence Short Film Festival	Audience Award (International)	Won
2012	Port Townsend Film Festival	Special Jury Commendation	Won

== Release ==
The film was released in February 2013 on iTunes and in a theatrical run with the other 14 Oscar-nominated short films by ShortsHD.
