= Mad as Hell =

2015 film by Andrew Napier

- Theatrical release poster
- Directed by: Andrew Napier
- Written by: Andrew Napier
- Produced by: Hal Duncan; Eric Ekman; Andrew Napier
- Starring: Cenk Uygur; Ana Kasparian; Ben Mankiewicz; John Iadarola
- Cinematography: Daniel Katz; Andrew Napier
- Edited by: Eric Ekman; Andrew Napier
- Music by: Ronen Landa
- Production company: Wrecking Crew
- Distributed by: Oscilloscope
- Release date: November 6, 2014 (United States)
- Running time: 82 minutes
- Country: United States
- Language: English

Mad as Hell is a 2014 documentary film about the web series The Young Turks and its host, Cenk Uygur. The film's title refers to a famous line uttered by the character Howard Beale in the 1976 film Network, "I'm as mad as hell, and I'm not going to take this anymore!"

== Synopsis ==
The film details how Cenk Uygur created the web series The Young Turks. The film also chronicles Uygur's time as a potential host at MSNBC before his departure in June 2011, citing conflicting views between Uygur and MSNBC executives.

== Cast ==
- Cenk Uygur
- Ana Kasparian
- Ben Mankiewicz
- John Iadarola

== Production ==
The film was funded via Indiegogo. It raised $69,423, which was 116% of its $60,000 goal.

== Release ==
It was released theatrically in the USA on November 6, 2014, and on DVD on April 7, 2015.

== Reception ==
On review aggregator Rotten Tomatoes, the film holds an approval rating of 27% based on eleven reviews, with an average rating of 5.54/10. On Metacritic, the film has a weighted average score of 52 out of 100, based on nine critics, indicating "mixed or average reviews".

Writing for RogerEbert.com, Godfrey Cheshire awarded it a score of three out of four stars, saying that Uygur's "pioneering efforts certainly remind us how controlled most 'news' in this country is, and how much alternatives to them are needed."

The Hollywood Reporter said, "Mad as Hell is far too subjective to take seriously."

TheWrap also awarded the film a negative review, saying "'Mad as Hell' will probably reward fans of Uygur and The Young Turks, but much like the clips we see of Uygur in his full-flowering arm-waving wrath, it’s just sound and fury signifying very, very little."

=== Criticism ===
Slant Magazine awarded it two and a half out of four stars, and was critical of how the film focused primarily on Uygur rather than current media practices, saying "Yet instead of using Uygur as a means to further an investigation into current media practices, Napier is ultimately too enamored with the man and his convictions that the film hews more closely to being a conventional and one-sided biographical portrait."
