= Harmonies for the Haunted =

Studio album by Stellastarr
- Released: September 13, 2005
- Genres: Indie rock, post-punk revival
- Length: 46:26
- Label: RCA
- Producer: David Schiffmann

Stellastarr chronology
Stellastarr (2003)	Harmonies for the Haunted (2005)	Civilized (2009)

Alternative cover
- UK edition cover

Professional ratings
Aggregate scores
Source	Rating
Metacritic	58/100
Review scores
Source	Rating
AllMusic	3/5 stars
Drowned in Sound	7/10
The Guardian	2/5 stars
NME	4/10
Pitchfork	6.9/10
PopMatters	5/10
Rolling Stone	3.5/5 stars
Spin	D
Stylus	B
The Village Voice	C

Harmonies for the Haunted is the second album by american indie rock band Stellastarr. It was released in the United States on September 13, 2005, by RCA Records, and on March 6, 2006, in the United Kingdom. The album was released with the copy protection software MediaMax CD-3 in North America.

The song "Sweet Troubled Soul" featured in the film Aquamarine.

== Track listing ==
1. "Lost in Time" – 4:31
2. "Damn This Foolish Heart" – 3:30
3. "The Diver" – 4:32
4. "Sweet Troubled Soul" – 4:07
5. "Born in a Fleamarket" – 2:34
6. "On My Own" – 4:53
7. "When I Disappear" – 3:48
8. "Love and Longing" – 4:18
9. "Stay Entertained" – 3:46
10. "Island Lost at Sea" – 10:27

The UK version (released March 6, 2006) includes an extra track, "Angela", inserted between "Love and Longing" and "Stay Entertained".

The iTunes version of the album does not feature "Bloated Wife," but instead includes "Precious Games" as track 11.

The vinyl LP version does not feature any of these bonus or hidden tracks.

== Charts ==
Chart (2005)	Peak position
Billboard Top Heatseekers	12

=== Singles ===
Year	Single	Chart	Peak position
2005	"Sweet Troubled Soul"	US Hot Dance Club Play	37
