= Enter Nowhere =

- Directed by: Jack Heller
- Written by: Shawn Christensen; Jason Dolan
- Produced by: Jack Heller; Dallas Sonnier
- Starring: Scott Eastwood; Sara Paxton; Katherine Waterston; Shaun Sipos; Jesse J. Perez
- Cinematography: Tom Harting
- Music by: Darren Morze
- Distributed by: Lionsgate
- Release date: October 22, 2011 (Screamfest Film Festival)
- Running time: 90 minutes
- Country: United States
- Language: English

Enter Nowhere (also known as The Haunting of Black Wood) is a 2011 psychological thriller film directed by Jack Heller and starring Scott Eastwood, Sara Paxton, and Katherine Waterston.

The film was rereleased under the title The Haunting of Black Wood in 2015.

The film depicts a temporal paradox. Four strangers from different time periods are trapped together in a forest cabin located outside Wieluń in 1945. One of them is a German soldier who is serving in World War II, and he is the only one native to this time period. The strangers eventually realize that they represent four generations of the same family, that they all died in tragic circumstances, and that their fates were connected. They attempt to change their family's history by preventing the soldier's death.

== Plot ==
Jody and her boyfriend Kevin Banks go rob a convenience store. While the cashier is giving them money at gunpoint, Jody demands the cashier open an old safe. He tells her that he will, but cryptically says that Jody wouldn’t be able to handle what's inside. Annoyed, Jody shoots the cashier, and the scene fades.

Samantha or "Sam", a quiet reserved woman, has car trouble and finds a small cabin in the woods while looking for help. She comes across Tom, who is also lost and has taken shelter in the cabin for three days. The next morning, while Tom is out looking for help, he keeps coming back to the cabin even though he is walking in one direction. Sam finds Jody unconscious outside the door of the cabin. Jody tells Sam and Tom that she doesn't know how she arrived there. The next morning, the trio venture into the woods to escape, only to return to the cabin again. The situation becomes even stranger when the three are convinced that they are in different regions of the USA.

Near the cabin, they find a bunker with maps and food supplies. Sam deduces the maps and labels on food are written in German.

While Tom is bringing supplies to the cabin from the shelter, Sam says it’s the year 1962, which surprises Jody as she believes it’s 1985. When Tom comes in and is asked the current year, he responds it’s 2011 — increasing the confusion even further.

As the three are trying to figure out what is happening, they hear gunshots outside. Outside the cabin, they find a soldier with a gun. The man, Hans Neumann, turns out to be a German soldier. Not understanding English, Hans knocks out Tom and ties him up in the woods, while the women are tied up inside the cabin. Hans attempts to find out who they are, using Sam as an interpreter as she understands German, but he becomes hostile as he believes that the three are withholding information. He does not believe that they are confused as to how they got there.

However, after Hans finds out both Jody and Sam possess the same locket that contains a photo of his wife, he becomes frantic and demands an explanation. Hans takes the women out to where Tom is tied up, only to be knocked unconscious by Tom, who has untied himself. After Hans is tied up, Sam begins to realise that Hans is her father, who was killed during an airstrike in Poland. Sam further deduces Jody is her daughter "Jody Cohen", as Jody's father and Sam's husband, Adam Cohen, was killed during the Vietnam War. Sam died during childbirth, while Jody is raised by Adam's parents, who disliked Sam and often abused Jody. The three now realise that all four people are related as Tom deduces Jody is his mother, who was executed for murdering his father Kevin and the cashier seen at the beginning of the film, in addition to armed robbery of gas stations all over the Midwestern United States.

Sam decides to free Hans and explain everything to him. Hans does not attack the trio, but he decides to leave the cabin to carry on with his mission. The three further share their "dreams": Sam had a dream that she was about to give birth to Jody, but she was alone and helpless in her house; Jody had a dream that she was executed by lethal injection; Tom had a dream that he killed a priest who wronged him, before committing suicide. Sam then finds out they are in fact all in the woods outside Wieluń in 1945, where Hans was killed in an airstrike about to happen.

Tom concludes with that they must save Hans from being killed in the imminent airstrike. If they succeed, Sam would not be alone during her childbirth as she would be accompanied by her parents. Hence, Jody would grow up with a mother instead of being adopted by her abusive paternal grandparents, preventing her from becoming a criminal. Tom would then not kill the priest and commit suicide. Tom goes outside and follows Hans to keep him off his mission to avoid his death in the airstrike. The two end up fighting. Jody tries to save Tom, but she is accidentally shot and critically wounded. Tom later disappears in front of Hans when Jody dies of her wound. Enraged upon seeing the death of Jody and the erasure of Tom, Sam accuses Hans of killing both before the airstrike.

Eventually, Sam convinces Hans to go into the shelter with her. During their escape, Sam falls and hits her head on a rock. Hans then carries her and the two reach the shelter in time. When in the shelter, Hans notices that Sam's existence is "on-and-off" before she disappears completely.

The scene cuts back to the first scene with Jody in the convenience store, but now dressed differently. She realises that she is in the grocery store in 1985 where she committed robbery in the previous timeline. She pays the cashier for her purchase and leaves for home before Kevin Banks, her boyfriend from previous timeline, enters the store to rob it with his current girlfriend. The events take place in the exact same manner as the previous timeline, including the girl demanding the cashier to open the safe.

It is revealed that Hans had survived the airstrike and left Germany for the United States after World War II. He then became a philanthropist and died in 1985. Sam survived her childbirth and now lives a happy life with Jody, with an unknown but brighter future awaiting Tom's potential birth.

== Cast ==
- Scott Eastwood as Tom
- Katherine Waterston as Samantha Neumann
- Sara Paxton as Jody Cohen
- Shaun Sipos as Hans Neumann
- Christopher Denham as Kevin Banks
- Leigh Lezark as Kevin’s girlfriend
- Jesse J. Perez as the cashier
- Vic Finalborgo as the priest
