= Civilized (album) =

Studio album by Stellastarr
- Released: July 7, 2009 (U.S.)
- Genre: Indie rock, post-punk revival
- Length: 39:15
- Label: Bloated Wife Records
- Producer: Tim O'Heir

Stellastarr chronology
Harmonies for the Haunted (2005)	Civilized (2009)

Civilized is the third and final album by indie rock band Stellastarr. It was released in the United States on July 7, 2009.

Professional ratings
Aggregate scores
Source	Rating
Metacritic	(56/100)
Review scores
Source	Rating
Slant	3/5 stars
The Washington Post	(favorable)
PopMatters	6/10 stars
Consequence of Sound	(C−)
Sputnik Music	(3/5)

== Track listing ==
1. "Robot" – 3:00
2. "Freak Out" – 3:27
3. "Tokyo Sky" – 4:16
4. "Numbers" – 3:50
5. "Graffiti Eyes" – 3:41
6. "Prom Zombie" – 3:26
7. "Warchild" – 3:33
8. "People" – 3:15
9. "Move On" – 4:02
10. "Sonja Cries" – 4:45
11. "Underneath the Knife" – 3:11 (iTunes only bonus track)
