= Before I Disappear =

- Theatrical release poster
- Directed by: Shawn Christensen
- Written by: Shawn Christensen
- Based on: Curfew by Shawn Christensen
- Produced by: Damon Russell; Lucan Toh; Shawn Christensen; Paul Wesley; Terry Leonard
- Starring: Shawn Christensen; Fátima Ptacek; Emmy Rossum; Paul Wesley; Ron Perlman
- Cinematography: Daniel Katz
- Edited by: Andrew Napier; Damon Russell
- Music by: Darren Morze
- Production companies: Fuzzy Logic Pictures; Wigwam Films; Strongman
- Distributed by: IFC Films; VisioSfeir Distribution
- Release dates: March 10, 2014 (South by Southwest); November 28, 2014
- Running time: 93 minutes
- Countries: United States; United Kingdom
- Language: English
- Box office: $10,078

Before I Disappear is a 2014 American drama film directed by Shawn Christensen. The film is a feature-length adaptation of his 2012 Oscar-winning short film, Curfew. The film had its world premiere at South by Southwest Film on March 10, 2014. The film was acquired for distribution by IFC Films on August 5, 2014, and released on November 28, 2014.

== Plot ==
In New York City, Richie (Shawn Christensen), a downtrodden young man whose girlfriend, Vista (Isabelle McNally), recently disappeared, discovers the corpse of a girl who died from a heroin overdose while he is cleaning bathroom stalls at a nightclub. The club owner, Bill (Ron Perlman), arranges for her body to be removed without notifying the authorities.

At his apartment, Richie attempts suicide by cutting one of his wrists in a bathtub, when he receives a call from his estranged sister, Maggie (Emmy Rossum), asking him to look after her eleven-year-old daughter, Sophia (Fátima Ptacek). Richie goes to her school, where she recites "Because I could not stop for Death" by Emily Dickinson in both English and Mandarin Chinese. Richie takes her to her apartment before heading home, where he attempts suicide by drug overdose. Richie hallucinates a drug dealer calling him on the phone, threatening him by saying he is in the building. Sophia calls, however, and informs Richie that her mother has not returned home.

Richie arrives at the lobby of Maggie's apartment, where he discovers that the drugs he took were Zolafren, intended for menopause. Outside Maggie's apartment, a suspicious-looking woman asks Richie about his sister's whereabouts. After entering, Maggie calls the apartment, indicating to Richie that she is in central booking and upon hearing of the woman, orders Richie to sneak Sophia out of the building.

Richie takes Sophia to a bowling alley where he works. Richie calls central booking, who inform him that his sister was arrested and is awaiting arraignment at 4:30 AM. The owner of the bowling alley, Gideon (Paul Wesley), has Richie brought to the office. Gideon informs him that his girlfriend has been missing for a day, with her last whereabouts being at Bill's nightclub, and produces a photograph, which Richie recognizes as being of the dead woman he saw the night before. Richie denies knowledge of her whereabouts. He calls Bill, who tells him to come in at 1:30 AM to discuss the situation.

As a favor to Richie, Gideon allows Maggie the use of his lawyer, Bruce Warham (Richard Schiff), who informs Maggie that in the public's eyes, she is a mistress, due to her having sexual relations to a married man, despite having been assaulted.

Richie tells Sophia about flip books he made growing up about a character called "Sophia". He brings Sophia to his former apartment in a downtrodden part of town, where he retrieves some flip books and calms his panicked niece by presenting the premise of a girl who dies in intricate ways, but comes back by the next installment. He then collapses from blood loss, but refuses to go to a hospital, due to promising Maggie to keep Sophia safe.

After Sophia tells him the cruel things her estranged father, Darren (Fran Kranz), says to her, Richie assaults him at his work. Richie and Sophia visit Bill, who divulges that Gideon's girlfriend had been resisting his advances and in retaliation, he gave her heroin. Richie returns to Maggie's apartment, where he returns Sophia home. Sophia tells him that his constant love letters to Vista would work if he told her he loves her.

Having reached an epiphany, Richie confronts Gideon, telling him what happened to his girlfriend. Gideon and his armed thugs abduct Richie, then drop him off alongside the road, before speeding off to deal with Bill. Richie re-encounters the blonde woman, who is revealed to be the wife of Maggie's lover. Richie makes his rendezvous with a released Maggie and escorts her to her apartment.

Maggie tells Richie that she does not want him to stay in her daughter's life, fearing him to be a "false idol". Richie tells her how much he looked up to her when they were younger and how much he still looks up to her now. He returns to his bathtub and prepares to kill himself, when Maggie calls him, inviting him over for dinner. Richie writes a much shorter letter to Vista, stating that he loves and misses her, before looking up and seeing an image of her sitting across from him.

== Cast ==
- Shawn Christensen as Richie
- Fátima Ptacek as Sophia
- Emmy Rossum as Maggie
- Paul Wesley as Gideon
- Ron Perlman as Bill
- Richard Schiff as Bruce
- Joseph Perrino as Ellis
- Fran Kranz as Darren
- Isabelle McNally as Vista
- Joseph DeVito as The Collector

== Release ==
Before I Disappear had its worldwide premiere at South by Southwest (SXSW) on March 11, 2014, where it won the Audience Award and was nominated for the Grand Jury Award. Following SXSW, the film was shown at a handful of festivals, including the 71st Venice International Film Festival, where it was the only American film that was selected for the Venice Days program. IFC Films was announced to have acquired the American distribution rights to Before I Disappear on August 5, 2014. IFC gave the film a limited theatrical release on November 28, 2014.

=== Home media ===
Simultaneous with the home media distribution of Before I Disappear, IFC released the film on November 28, 2014, on video on demand via Amazon.com and iTunes. The film was released on DVD and Netflix on May 19, 2015.

== Reception ==
=== Box office ===
The film opened on November 28, 2014, in one theater and on select VOD platforms. As of August 2016, it earned $10,078 from five screens.

=== Critical response ===
The film won the South by Southwest Audience Award and was in competition at the Venice Film Festival.

On Rotten Tomatoes it holds a 37% approval rating based on 30 reviews, with an average rating of 6/10. Metacritic gives the film a rating of 47/100 based on 13 critic reviews.

Moviefone called it "visually daring, nearly wondrous, and might be the best late night New York movie since Martin Scorsese's After Hours. Justin Chang of Variety called it "visually well mounted, but too overwrought to really convince or resonate". Eric Kohn of Indiewire rated it B− and wrote that the film "contains all the strong moments that distinguished Curfew while surrounding them with a lot of superfluous additions". Mark Adams of Screen Daily described it as "a stylish and beautifully shot adaptation, strong on performance and a nicely nuanced script, but in the end perhaps lacking an expanded story to suit its feature length." David Rooney of The Hollywood Reporter wrote a negative review, in which he criticized the writing and flow of the film as being sporadic, but gave credit to the performances of the actors.

=== Accolades ===
Award	Date of Ceremony	Category	Recipient(s) and nominee(s)	Result	Ref(s)
South by Southwest	March 11, 2014	Audience Award	Before I Disappear	Won	
South by Southwest	March 11, 2014	SXSW Grand Jury Award	Before I Disappear	Nominated	
Vail Film Festival	March 28, 2014	Best Feature Film	Before I Disappear	Won	
Ashland Independent Film Festival	April 7, 2014	Best Cinematography	Daniel Katz	Won	
Nashville Film Festival	April 26, 2014	Grand Jury Prize	Before I Disappear	Won	
Hill Country Film Festival	May 3, 2014	Best Feature Film	Before I Disappear	Won	
71st Venice International Film Festival	September 6, 2014	Venice Days Award	Before I Disappear	Nominated	
Northeast Film Festival	September 7, 2014	Best Feature	Before I Disappear	Won	
Northeast Film Festival	September 7, 2014	Best Director of a Feature	Shawn Christensen	Won	
Northeast Film Festival	September 7, 2014	Best Actor in a Feature	Shawn Christensen	Won	
Northeast Film Festival	September 7, 2014	Best Actress in a Feature	Fátima Ptacek	Won	
Northeast Film Festival	September 7, 2014	Best Supporting Actor in a Feature	Ron Perlman	Nominated	
Northeast Film Festival	September 7, 2014	Best Supporting Actor in a Feature	Paul Wesley	Nominated	
Northeast Film Festival	September 7, 2014	Best Supporting Actress in a Feature	Isabelle McNally	Nominated	
Northeast Film Festival	September 7, 2014	Best Supporting Actress in a Feature	Emmy Rossum	Won	
Northeast Film Festival	September 7, 2014	Best Screenplay	Before I Disappear	Nominated	
Skyline Indie Film Fest	September 14, 2014	Festival Winner	Before I Disappear	Won	
Skyline Indie Film Fest	September 14, 2014	Best Feature	Before I Disappear	Won	
Skyline Indie Film Fest	September 14, 2014	Fan Favorite	Before I Disappear	Won	
Hell's Half Mile Film & Music Festival	September 28, 2014	Best Lead Actor	Shawn Christensen	Won	
Hell's Half Mile Film & Music Festival	September 28, 2014	Best Cinematography	Daniel Katz	Won	
Hell's Half Mile Film & Music Festival	September 28, 2014	Audience Award	Before I Disappear	Won	
Hollywood Film Festival	October 19, 2014	Best Narrative Feature	Before I Disappear	Won	
Collinsville Film Festival	May 17, 2015	Whole Foods Audience Choice Best Feature Film	Before I Disappear	Won	
Collinsville Film Festival	May 17, 2015	Avery's Beverages Best Narrative Feature	Before I Disappear	Won	
