= Battlefield 6 =

2025 video game

- Developer: Battlefield Studios (Note: Battlefield Studios ("BF Studios" for short) is a collaborative effort between DICE, Ripple Effect Studios, Criterion Games, and Motive Studio; Ridgeline Games also contributed to its development before its closure in 2024.)
- Publisher: Electronic Arts
- Composers: Henry Jackman; Limp Bizkit
- Series: Battlefield
- Engine: Frostbite (Note: The Battlefield Portal map editor uses Godot.)
- Platforms: PlayStation 5; Windows; Xbox Series X/S
- Release: October 10, 2025
- Genre: First-person shooter
- Modes: Single-player, multiplayer

Battlefield 6 is a 2025 online-only first-person shooter video game developed by Battlefield Studios and published by Electronic Arts. Serving as the eighteenth installment in the Battlefield series, the game was released for PlayStation 5, Windows, and Xbox Series X/S on October 10, 2025. A free-to-play battle royale mode, titled RedSec, was released on October 28, 2025.

Set between 2027 and 2028, the game's storyline revolves around a conflict between a fractured NATO and Pax Armata, a private military company. Influenced by the previous entries Battlefield 3 (2011) and Battlefield 4 (2013), Battlefield 6 features a serious tone. The multiplayer mode features four character classes: Assault, Engineer, Support, and Recon, who each specialize with different weapons and combat strategies, and has several returning game modes, with the new Escalation mode being added.

After Battlefield 2042 (2021) received critical derision from both critics and players, a new title in the series began development under the leadership of Vince Zampella. With an estimated budget exceeding $400 million, Battlefield 6 is one of the most expensive video games ever developed. Following leaks from March 2025 to July, Battlefield 6 was officially revealed later that month. Two open beta periods were held in August, with the first attracting over 500,000 concurrent players on Steam. The game was a critical and commercial success, selling over 7 million units in three days from release and becoming the biggest launch in the series' history. Battlefield 6 received accolades at the Game Awards, Hollywood Music in Media Awards, and the Ultra Game Awards.

== Gameplay ==
Battlefield 6 places a focus on environmental destructibility, as buildings can be demolished using explosives or heavy vehicles.

Similar to its predecessors, Battlefield 6 is a first-person shooter. The game features four character classes: Assault, Engineer, Support, and Recon. The Assault class is proficient with assault rifles and grenade launchers and favors a run-and-gun playstyle with faster health regeneration. The Engineer class uses submachine guns, can repair friendly vehicles, and specializes in destroying hostile vehicles with explosives. The Support class excels with light machine guns and supports teammates by resupplying ammo, placing makeshift cover, and healing and reviving allies. The Recon class can carry out battlefield reconnaissance, uses sniper rifles, and is ideal for long-range engagements as a headshot kill prevents opponents from being revived. While any class can use any weapon, each class has unique gameplay perks when using specific weapons. For example, Recon players can hold their breath while aiming with a sniper rifle. Weapons can be extensively customized with mods, but each weapon has a designated attachment point limit that cannot be exceeded.

Battlefield 6 also introduces several quality-of-life improvements, including a new movement system called the "Kinesthetic Combat System", which allows players to lean around cover, hitchhike onto vehicles, and drag fallen soldiers to safety before reviving them. As with previous entries in the series, the game emphasizes environmental destructibility. Buildings can be demolished with explosives, and obstacles or floors can be destroyed to create new paths. Maps are sprawling, suitable for both infantry and vehicular combat. Each map also includes "Combat Zones"—smaller, more confined areas designed for close-quarters combat. At launch nine maps are available, with additional maps planned for release through post-launch updates.

Battlefield 6 offers multiple multiplayer modes, including returning modes such as Conquest, Breakthrough, Rush, Team Deathmatch, Squad Deathmatch, Domination, and King of the Hill. A new mode, Escalation, pits two teams against each other as they seek to control capture points in a map. However, the number of points gradually decreases, funneling players into specific map areas. Another new mode is Sabotage, which has two teams each take one six-minute long turn attacking and trying to destroy enemy boxes, while the other team defends. Whichever team destroys the most boxes in the shortest amount of time wins.

Players are grouped into squads of maximum 4 players. Members of the same squad can talk to each other on voice chat. Communication with the rest of the team, or with all of the players in the lobby is limited to text chat.

=== Portal ===
The Battlefield Portal feature returns in Battlefield 6 with a complete overhaul from its Battlefield 2042 iteration. In 2042, Portal was limited to a basic visual block editor and web-based configuration options. Battlefield 6's Portal is powered by the Godot engine, providing map creation and game logic tools that represent a significant advancement over the previous system. The new editor enables creators to build custom game modes, design original maps using Battlefield 6's existing map foundations and assets, and script complex gameplay mechanics.

EA showcased Portal's capabilities prior to launch with demonstrations including a recreation of Counter-Strike's "Dust II", complete with bomb defusal mechanics, as well as various custom modes such as zombies survival and racing challenges. Within two days of Battlefield 6's October 10 release, the community had already produced notable creations, including a remake of Call of Duty 4: Modern Warfare's Shipment map and a Star Destroyer constructed from in-game assets, demonstrating the editor's versatility. Portal experiences can be shared through a dedicated community browser where players can discover and play user-generated content.

=== Battle royale ===
A free-to-play battle royale mode, titled Battlefield RedSec (short for Redacted Sector), was released on October 28 alongside the game's first season. It also includes a knockout elimination mode called "Gauntlet" - replaced in season five by Rapid Royale - and support for Portal.

== Plot ==
In September 2027, NATO forces prepare to evacuate Georgia to make way for the private military company Pax Armata, ostensibly in a peaceful transfer. While preparing for a briefing, U.S. Marine Raider Gunnery Sergeant Dylan Murphy (Jay Walker) and his squad Tempest 1-2 are ambushed by Pax forces in an unprovoked offensive on their base. Murphy rallies his squad to destroy critical cybersecurity installations to prevent Pax Armata from acquiring them; they succeed in doing so, however while escaping their extraction helicopter is shot down by enemy fire and crashes, to which the team barely survives initially, but they soon then become completely surrounded and overrun by Pax troops that leads into an intense last stand gun battle that kills the entire squad, except Murphy, leaving him the sole survivor before his rescue.

Over the next few months, the conflict worsens when the NATO Secretary General is assassinated by Pax Armata, and after no response from NATO, twelve nations leave the alliance in favor of allying with Pax. Meanwhile, Murphy is reassigned to a new Marine Raider squad, Dagger 1–3, under the command of CIA handler Melissa Mills (Erica Luttrell). In March 2028, Dagger's squad leader Master Sergeant Haz Carter (Damon Dayoub) and sniper Staff Sergeant Simone "Gecko" Espina (Ashley Reyes) are deployed to Gibraltar to assist a British squad in repelling against Pax's occupation, before linking up with Murphy and Dagger's medic Staff Sergeant Cliff Lopez (Jack Murillo) on the main offensive. At city hall, they witness the British squad leader's capture and execution by Pax's local field commander, Alexander Kincaid (Tony Curran), who subsequently escapes.

In June, Mills assigns Dagger to extract biometrics CEO Fayek Selim (Wessam Eldein) from Pax occupied Cairo, with help from Ibrahim Al-Khatib (Adam Lindo), leader of Egyptian Army special forces Unit 777; during this mission it's revealed that Kincaid is an ex-SAS operative who served alongside Carter, before the latter was forced to leave Kincaid behind during a joint American-British covert mission on the border of Iraq and Syria that went horribly wrong (Referencing and dating back to the events in Battlefield 3). Dagger's assignment goes awry, resulting in Selim's death, though the squad extracts the intel needed from Selim's RFID chip in his thumb. The chip reveals Kincaid is planning an attack on New York City, where a NATO summit is being held. Dagger is deployed to Brooklyn to neutralize the Pax cell planning the attack, While Dagger manages to neutralize the initial attack, they realize Kincaid's real target is U.S. President Fernandez (Benito Martinez). The following morning, Pax ambushes Fernandez's motorcade; Dagger manages to extract the President and lead him to safety, but Kincaid ambushes Murphy and Carter, resulting in Kincaid fatally stabbing Carter. Before Carter dies, he makes Murphy squad leader of Dagger.

In the aftermath, Fernandez announces the creation of a NATO global response force, and declares war against Pax Armata. In July, Al-Khatib leads an Egyptian tank column to break through Pax's lines on the outskirts of Cairo. In September, with the addition of CIA Special Activities Center operative Lucas Hemlock (Nikolai Nikolaeff), Dagger is deployed to Tajikistan to neutralize Pax's air defenses near their home base, before joining NATO on the main assault, where they destroy hypersonic missiles containing the explosive and extremely destructive nano-compound NXC. Dagger apprehends Kincaid, who reveals that Pax Armata was secretly created and backed by the CIA, while also claiming that he was Mills' asset inside Pax, implicating her role in Pax's rise. Kincaid attempts to pull a knife, but is shot dead in self-defense by Hemlock. Mills cuts contact with Dagger and calls in an airstrike to cover up loose ends, though the squad manages to escape.

Three days later, Dagger infiltrates and raids Mills' home in McLean, Virginia, while interrogating her, they then begin to put together the pieces surrounding their missions: Pax Armata attacked NATO in Georgia because they were after "Project Veles", an advanced stealth technology that could black out satellite imagery, which was housed in the installations Murphy destroyed; the operation in Gibraltar was their second, successful attempt at acquiring it, allowing them to operate unseen in critical operations like in Cairo, Brooklyn, and Tajikistan; and Selim was selling to both sides by providing Pax with the intel they needed to conduct their Brooklyn assault. Together, Mills and Selim supplied Pax with the NXC and the intel on Veles. Under duress, Mills reveals that Pax Armata was intended by the CIA to consolidate all anti-American movements under one banner and serve as a common enemy for the United States, with the intention of eventually having one of Mills' assets take over the organization, and that Kincaid was indeed one of Mills' moles. However, the PMC ultimately grew too large for the CIA to control, and Kincaid went rogue. After Dagger eliminates a Pax Armata team sent to extract Mills, Murphy, under orders from Dagger's new anonymous handler, executes her.

== Development ==
Battlefield 6 is developed by DICE, Criterion Games, Motive Studio and Ripple Effect Studios, under the collective branding of Battlefield Studios. Before the studio's closure in 2024, Ridgeline Games was also involved in the development, focusing on the single-player campaign. DICE leads the multiplayer development. Motive and Criterion lead the development of the single-player campaign, with Motive also contributing to multiplayer map design. Ripple Effect Studios is currently leading the development of the battle royale mode. Following the negative response to the previous installment Battlefield 2042 (2021), focus was put on attempting to improve that game and developing a new entry via Battlefield Studios under Vince Zampella, who was installed as overall head of Battlefield weeks after the launch of 2042. Battlefield 6 would become the last game that Zampella oversaw before his death in December 2025. In July 2025, Ars Technica reported that the game faced significant development challenges, including team burnout and exhaustion, cultural clashes among the four studios, unrealistic sales expectations from EA, and a ballooning budget far exceeding $400 million. This would make Battlefield 6 one of the most expensive video games to develop, described by EA CEO Andrew Wilson as an "all-in as a company" effort.

Following the response to 2042, EA launched "Battlefield Labs", a closed-access worldwide playtest for Battlefield 6, allowing DICE to collect feedback from players and make gameplay adjustments. Battlefield 3 (2011) and Battlefield 4 (2013), described by Zampella as the "heyday" of the franchise, were cited by the team as their main sources of inspiration, and the team added that the game will have a "serious" tone. Battlefield: Bad Company 2 (2010) influenced the creation of the "Tactical Destruction" system, and the team made an intentional design choice to prevent players from destroying all buildings in a map. Given the limits to the system memory of the Xbox Series S, the development team had to implement software optimization to accommodate the technical limits, the benefits of which technical director Christian Buhl said applied to the game as a whole. Battlefield 6 was the first mainline Battlefield game since Battlefield 4 to include a linear narrative campaign. Motive further added that Lioness and Civil War, stories about "talented but ordinary people put in extraordinary situations", inspired the team.

Battlefield 6 utilizes EA's new kernel-level anti-cheat Javelin, which requires that secure boot be enabled in the computer's firmware. An earlier version of Javelin was first introduced into Battlefield 2042 in late 2023, with earlier Battlefield titles receiving updates in 2024. During the open beta period, which used Javelin, players reported conflicts between Javelin and Riot Vanguard, Valorant's kernel-level anti-cheat software. Phillip Koskinas, the head of the anti-cheat team at Riot Games, stated that while Vanguard can co-exist on the same system with Javelin, Battlefield 6 does not allow the Valorant launcher to be running simultaneously. Electronic Arts claimed in August 2025 that the Javelin anti-cheat has blocked over 300,000 attempts to cheat. Following the open beta, technical director Christian Buhl mentioned that Battlefield Studios partnered with Sony and Microsoft to detect cheating on their respective platforms.

== Music ==
The score for the game was composed by Henry Jackman, while the soundtrack was provided by Limp Bizkit. To support the game's launch, the single "Making Love to Morgan Wallen" was released on September 12, 2025. It was the band's final release to feature bassist Sam Rivers before his passing in October of that year.

== Release and promotion ==
In February 2025, publisher Electronic Arts announced Battlefield Labs and released gameplay from a pre-alpha build. By March 2025, early gameplay footage from Battlefield Labs had been leaked online by playtesters. The title was leaked early in July 2025 when EA sent packages to influencers featuring the Battlefield 6 logo. The game was officially revealed as Battlefield 6 on July 22, 2025. Two open beta periods were held in August 2025; progression awarded players with items that could be used in-game at launch. The first open beta period attracted more than 500,000 concurrent players on Steam. Following the open beta period, Battlefield 2042 received an update that added a new battle pass. It features items that could be used in Battlefield 6. The campaign trailer debuted at PlayStation's State of Play in September 2025, and a live-action trailer starring Zac Efron, Paddy Pimblett, Jimmy Butler, and Morgan Wallen playing roles based on the game's classes was released on September 28, 2025. Battlefield 6 was released on October 10, 2025, for PlayStation 5, Windows and Xbox Series X/S.

Shortly after launch, players reported having issues on Windows, specifically the EA App, where the game, despite being purchased and installed, apparently required the purchase of DLC to play; on Steam, players reported that the game remained unavailable when attempting to download. Battlefield Studios confirmed on Twitter that they were diagnosing the issue; they offered affected players in-game bonuses, with players who bought the "Phantom Edition" gaining access to the following season's battle pass. During the outage, Battlefield director Vince Zampella spoke out on Twitter regarding the situation, calling it "honestly embarrassing".

=== Post-launch updates ===
Being a live service game, major post-launch updates of Battlefield 6 take the form of seasonal updates with corresponding battle passes, while numerous, smaller updates have been pushed out by Battlefield Studios to tweak certain game elements. In April 2026, Battlefield Studios disclosed a 2026 roadmap for Battlefield 6, affirming the arrival of Seasons 3, 4, and 5, which will be released in May, July, and Fall of 2026, respectively.

Battlefield 6 seasons
Season number	Release date	Description
Year 1
1	October 28, 2025	This season is divided into three parts: Rogue Ops, California Resistance, and Winter Offensive. A new battle royale and a knockout elimination mode titled Gauntlet as part of RedSec were introduced, which is free-to-play without owning Battlefield 6. New maps set in Southern California include Blackwell Fields, Eastwood, and a limited time winter version of Empire State titled Ice Lock Empire State, including the battle royale-exclusive Fort Lyndon. New equipment, including weapons and a new vehicle, were also introduced.
2	February 17, 2026	This season is divided into three parts: Extreme Measures, Nightfall, and Hunter/Prey. Two new maps, both taking place in Bavaria, include Contaminated and Hagental Base. New permanent and limited-time modes for both the main game and Redsec, including a take on the Operations mode from Battlefield 1 named Operation Augur. New weapons and vehicles were also added.
3	May 12, 2026	This season is divided into three parts: Warlords Supremacy, Blastpoint and High-Value Target. Two new maps which are remakes of maps from older Battlefield titles, Railway to Golmud (Golmud Railway from Battlefield 4) set in Tajikistan after the events of the campaign, and Cairo Bazzar (Grand Bazzar from Battlefield 3). A new Ranked mode for the battle royale was added as part of Battlefield Labs. New modes, weapons and gadgets as well as gunplay changes in the final phase of the season.
4	July 21, 2026	This season is divided into three parts: Pacific Front, Top Gun and Tidal Strike. The seasons saw the return of naval warfare with the location set in the Pacific Ocean. Two new maps, Tsuru Reef and the return of Wake Island, making its 10th official appearance in the franchise. The second part of the season was a collaboration with the Top Gun franchise, including a new squad unit featuring Rooster and Bob. New modes, which included Carrier Strike a mode based on the Titan and Carrier Assault modes from Battlefield 2142 and Battlefield 4 respectively. New weapons and vehicles, the return of spectator mode and the additions of custom lobbies and proximity voice chat, the latter only in Redsec and set to be added in a later update into the main game.
5	October 13, 2026	This season is divided into three parts: Siege of Las Vegas, Casino Heist and Frozen Aces. This seasons setting is in Nevada, with three new maps: Vegas Strip, Area 51 and European Casino. The first phase of the season sees a collaboration with the Dead Space franchise with a special Dead Space themed PVE event, this is the second time the Battlefield franchise has collaborated with them, the first being in Battlefield 2042. The first phase also adds in a new fast-paced Redsec gamemode called Rapid Royale which replaces Gauntlet. The final phase of the season features reworks of the launch map New Sobek City and Season 1 map Blackwell Fields following negative community feedback on the two maps. The final phase also adds another operation titled Operation High Roller, as well as reintroducing Platoons and a Server browser with persistent servers along with new weapons and vehicles.

== Reception ==
=== Critical reception ===
Reception

Aggregate scores
Aggregator	Score
Metacritic	(PC) 82/100 (PS5) 83/100 (XSXS) 84/100
OpenCritic	90% recommend

Review scores
Publication	Score
Eurogamer	4/5
Famitsu	9/10, 9/10, 9/10, 8/10
Game Informer	8.5/10
GameSpot	7/10
GamesRadar+	4/5
Hardcore Gamer	4/5
IGN	SP: 5/10; MP: 8/10
NME	3/5
PCGamesN	9/10
Video Games Chronicle	4/5
VG247	4/5

Battlefield 6 received "generally favorable" reviews from critics, according to review aggregator website Metacritic. OpenCritic assessed that 90% of critics recommended the game. In Japan, four critics from Famitsu gave the game a total score of 35 out of 40.

The single-player campaign received negative reviews with criticism for its storytelling. Simon Cardy of IGN gave the campaign 5/10, describing it as "a safe, dull reimagining of what Battlefield once was, rather than a bold reinvention of what it could be." Bobby Pashalidis of Console Creatures gave it a 6 out of 10 explaining that "Battlefield 6's campaign is brief and forgettable, lacking both memorable setpieces and meaningful statements."

=== Sales ===
On October 16, 2025, EA announced that Battlefield 6 had sold over 7 million units in 3 days since release, making it the biggest launch in the series' history.

In the United States, the game topped the sales charts in the month of October 2025, coming in ahead of Pokémon Legends: Z-A and Ghost of Yōtei. It became the best-selling video game in the United States in 2025. Later the same year, Battlefield 6 outsold Call of Duty: Black Ops 7, making it the first Battlefield game to sell more copies than a Call of Duty title.

=== Awards ===
Year	Award	Category	Result	Ref.
2025	Golden Joystick Awards	Best Multiplayer	Nominated	
2025	Golden Joystick Awards	Best Audio Design	Nominated	
2025	Golden Joystick Awards	Best Game Trailer	Nominated	
2025	16th Hollywood Music in Media Awards	Music Supervision – Video Game	Won	
2025	The Game Awards 2025	Best Audio Design	Won	
2025	The Game Awards 2025	Best Action Game	Nominated	
2025	The Game Awards 2025	Best Multiplayer Game	Nominated	
2026	The Steam Awards 2025	Better With Friends	Nominated	
2026	Ultra Game Awards 2025	Shooter Game of the Year	Won	
2026	29th Annual D.I.C.E. Awards	Online Game of the Year	Nominated	
2026	73rd Golden Reel Awards	Outstanding Achievement in Sound Editing – Game Dialogue / ADR	Nominated	
2026	73rd Golden Reel Awards	Outstanding Achievement in Sound Editing – Game Effects / Foley	Nominated	
2026	24th Visual Effects Society Awards	Outstanding Visual Effects in a Commercial	Nominated	
2026	24th Visual Effects Society Awards	Outstanding Effects Simulations in an Episode, Commercial, Game Cinematic or Real-Time Project	Nominated	
2026	24th Visual Effects Society Awards	Outstanding Visual Arts in a Real-Time Project	Nominated	
2026	22nd British Academy Games Awards	Animation	Nominated	
2026	22nd British Academy Games Awards	Audio Achievement	Longlisted	
2026	22nd British Academy Games Awards	Multiplayer	Longlisted	
2026	22nd British Academy Games Awards	Technical Achievement	Longlisted	
