= Deep Time =

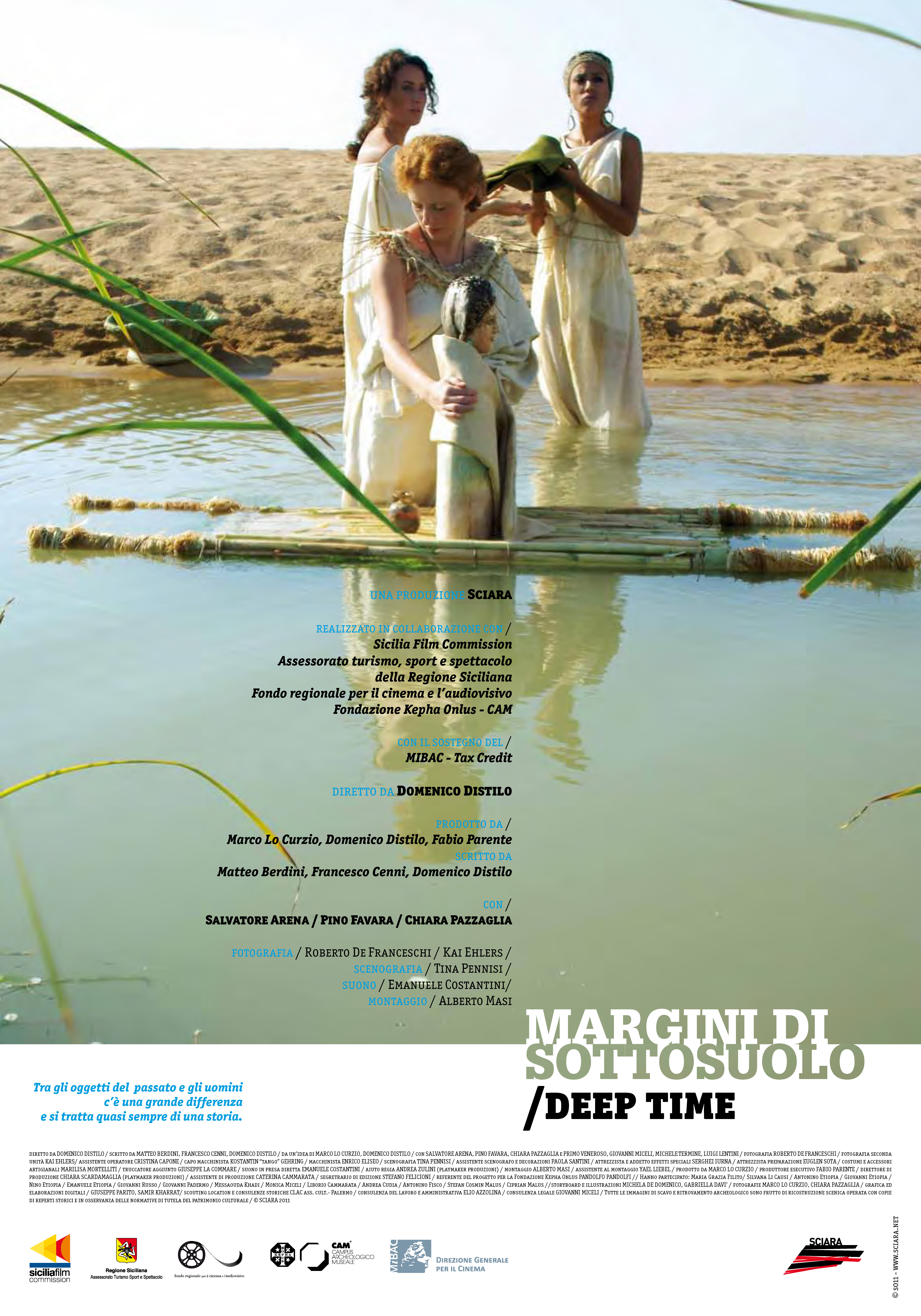
- poster
- Directed by: Domenico Distilo
- Written by: Matteo Berdini, Francesco Cenni, Domenico Distilo
- Produced by: Sciara
- Starring: Salvatore Arena, Pino Favara, Chiara Pazzaglia, Luigi Lentini, Giovanni Miceli, Michele Termine, Primo Veneroso
- Cinematography: Roberto De Franceschi, Kai Ehlers
- Edited by: Alberto Masi
- Music by: Teho Teardo
- Release date: 2011
- Running time: 80 min
- Country: Italy
- Language: Italian

Deep Time (Italian: margini di sottosuolo) is an Italian 2011 docufiction directed by Domenico Distilo.

The film, alternating documentary and fiction, explores themes related to anthropic geography and the feelings that bind men to their past, through encounters with former grave robbers previously active in the area of the archaeological site of Selinunte.

== Synopsis ==
The film tells the story of an elderly Sicilian grave robber, who begins to show signs of inexorable memory loss. The man travels the landscape like an explorer, a man of many paths and a thousand maps, capable of seeing what others miss. The advancing disease drives him on a desperate quest: to find his son, in a last attempt to perpetuate his memory. This intertwines with the investigations of an artist and photographer, who draws on ancient art as a source of inspiration for her performances. Their intersection leads to a series of encounters and discoveries that build the narrative fabric of the story.

== Production ==
The film, shot entirely in Selinunte, shows part of the Veneroso collection, an exceptional archaeological ensemble from the prehistoric era. Named in honour of the passionate archaeologist Primo Veneroso, this vast collection is one of the largest private archaeological collections in Italy. It is notable for including pottery from the 'Vaso campaniforme' culture, fundamental in redefining Sicily's role in the spread of this culture throughout prehistoric Western Europe.

The film's musical composition is entrusted to Teho Teardo, who, using a mix of traditional instruments and electronic sounds, contributes to creating evocative and suspended atmospheres, blending contemporary and classical elements already present in the evocative images of the archaeological site of Selinunte.

== Distribution ==
Deep time premiered in December 2011 at the Messina festival Assaggi di Realtà, winning the Maestri del Documentario (Masters of documentary films) award. It was subsequently broadcast in 2013 as a TV premiere on Rai 3 as part of Magazzini Einstein.

== Accolades ==
- 2011, Messina (Italy) - Assaggi di realtà festival
  - Premio maestri del documentario
