= Monolith (2016 film) =

2017 film by Ivan Silvestrini

- Directed by: Ivan Silvestrini
- Written by: Elena Bucaccio; Stefano Sardo; Ivan Silvestrini; Mauro Uzzeo
- Produced by: Giovanna Arata; Claudio Falconi; Lorenzo Foschi; Davide Luchetti; Guy Moshe; Andrea Nocetti; Matthew G. Zamias
- Starring: Katrina Bowden; Krew Nixon Hodges; Brandon Jones; Damon Dayoub; Jay Hayden; Justine Wachsberger
- Release dates: 29 August 2016 (Frightfest); 12 August 2017
- Country: Italy
- Language: English

Monolith is a 2016 thriller film directed by Ivan Silvestrini starring Katrina Bowden, Damon Dayoub and Brandon Jones.

The film was conceived by cartoonist Roberto Recchioni, who began a version of the film in the form of a graphic novel for Sergio Bonelli Editore, written together with Mauro Uzzeo and drawn and colored by Lorenzo Ceccotti, incorporating the film’s costume designs by Anina Pinter. The graphic novel was released in two volumes in January and May 2017, before the film's release.

== Plot ==
Set in the near future, Sandra (Katrina Bowden), a former member of a pop group called Hipstars, discovers thanks to her friend and member of the Hipstars, Jessa, that her husband (record producer Carl), has a lover. While in the Monolith car given to her by Carl, with her two-year-old son David, Sandra heads in the direction of Carl's parents' house, but on discovering Carl's unfaithfulness, decides to divert the journey and head for Los Angeles. The artificial intelligence computer found in the Monolith car, "Lilith", advises Sandra to take an off-road route. On the way, Sandra lights a cigarette to relax, but Lilith initiates the car's smoke alarm. The car accidentally hits a wild deer. Sandra screams in panic and checks for what happened. She gives her tearful son her smartphone to distract him with a game. While Sandra is outside the car, David plays with the Monolith app which Carl had installed on the phone for Sandra. He accidentally seals the car completely and prevents Sandra from entering, and drops the phone under the seat. Sandra starts looking for different ways to open the car, trying to find help at an electric charging station nearby, but she cannot find anyone and sleeps on the roof of the car for the night.

After a night filled with nightmares, Sandra begins to wander around the desert near the Monolith car. She finds an abandoned plane at a deserted airport, where she burns some tires using liquor from the plane’s minibar to form a distress signal, and finds an empty bottle. Then, thirsty, she finds a stream of water. After a while, she returns to the Monolith, where her son David, stuck in his child safety seat, is struggling to breathe and starts to lose consciousness, while the temperature of the car rises as the air conditioning is switched off. To try and get the car open, Sandra tries to use gasoline and branches to start a small fire, making the smoke alarm sound. As soon as she notices that David is in danger of losing consciousness, she extinguishes the fire with the water she found. Next, the Monolith (and Sandra) are attacked by a hungry coyote. Sandra manages to drive him away and tries in vain to open the car for the umpteenth time.

After another night of nightmares, Sandra notices that her son is unconscious, even though he had slightly moved his hand the day before. Sandra begins to lose hope when she notices that the coyote is back. Using a wrench found at the electrical station, she tries to tackle the coyote, which bites her ankle. Sandra understands that the coyote wants the carcass of the deer but as soon as it starts to feed, the Monolith car starts to move, descending down the hill. Sandra, using a stone that was nearby, stops the car.

Later, an idea comes to her. Sandra, before arriving in the desert, stopped at a gas station to buy things and saw on TV a cartoon in which a Wiley E. Coyote-like wolf throws a safe from a precipice to recover a diamond. Inspired by this, she decides to push the car further away from the hill, using the wrench to break the stone and intimidating the coyote, making him run away. The Monolith, falling, opens its doors and allows Sandra to recover the small David, apparently dying. To get out of the "hole" in which they seem to be, Sandra reluctantly relies on Lilith and reactivates her, selecting the off-road mode and freeing herself and the child.

Arriving in a hospital, Sandra sees David waking up, and the child addresses her as 'Mother' for the first time, having previously only ever called her 'Sandra'.

== Marketing ==
To promote the release of the film a website was created that advertised the car Monolith as if it were actually real and for sale.

== Release ==
The film premiered on 7 July 2017 at the Fondo Sclavi Festival and on 8 July 2017 at the Cine & Comic Fest.

The official release in Italian cinemas was 12 August 2017 and then on the Cinema channels of Sky Italia from 29 November of the same year.

== Reception ==
=== Box office ===
As a film primarily made by an Italian director and crew, the theatrical release was in Italy, with TV and on-demand releases following in other countries. In the first weekend of release in Italy earned €79,975. In total the film has grossed €330,823 in Italy.

=== Accolades ===
- Nominated for a David di Donatello Award in 2018 for Visual Effects.
- Nominated for the Best European Film at the Brussels International Fantastic Film Festival 2017.
