= Anina Pinter =

Hungarian-born costume designer

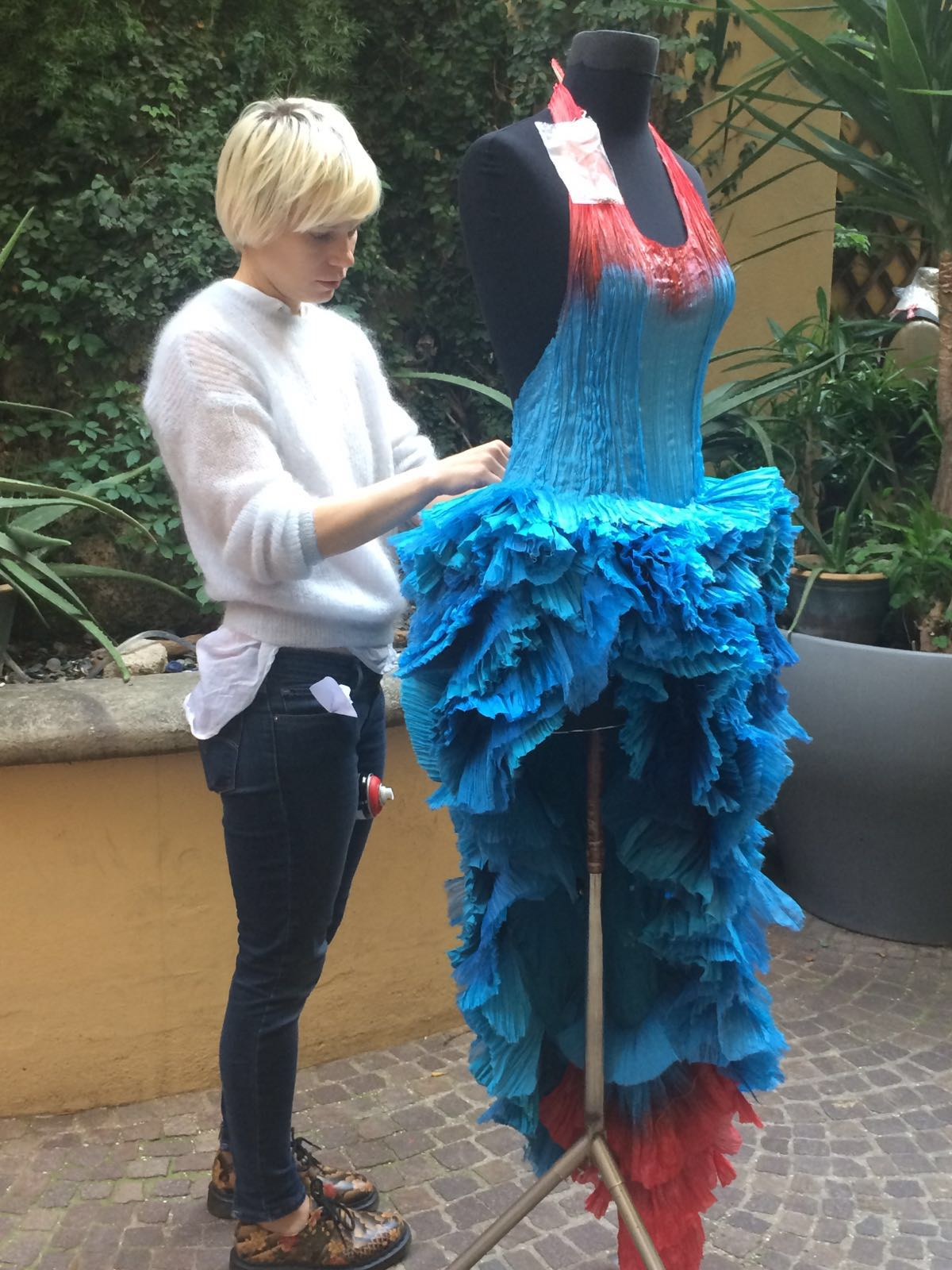
- Pinter at work
- Born: Nyiregyhaza, Hungary
- Education: Centro Sperimentale di Cinematografia
- Occupation: Costume designer
- Years active: 2001-present
- Website: www.aninapinter.com

Anina Pinter is a Los Angeles-based costume designer known for her work in films such as The Field Guide To Evil, Divergent and the National Geographic television series Year Million. She was born in Hungary, later training in Rome for 10 years with Italian costume designers Carlo Poggioli, Gabriella Pescucci and Milena Canonero, studying costume design in Rome with Piero Tosi at Centro Sperimentale di Cinematografia.

== Career ==
After the years of training in Rome, Anina began to work internationally on feature films as a costume designer, beginning with Perlasca – Un eroe Italiano. She worked as a costume illustrator on Peter Strickland's 2014 film The Duke of Burgundy. In 2016, Pinter worked with Italian Director Ivan Silvestrini on a Sky Italia feature film production, Monolith which was nominated for a David di Donatello Award. In 2017, Pinter was the costume designer for the National Geographic sci-fi docudrama TV series Year Million.

In 2018, she worked with British director Peter Strickland as costume designer for his segment of Legion M's The Field Guide To Evil, a horror anthology that screened at SXSW as well as film festivals around the world.

Pinter was announced as one of the international judges for the Not Film Fest in Santarcangelo di Romagna, Italy, held in 2018.

== Filmography ==
=== Film ===
List of works in film
Year	Title	Crew role	Notes	Source
2002	Perlasca – Un eroe Italiano	Costume design		
2008	Miracle at St. Anna	Costume assistant		
2008	Au Pair	Costume		
2010	Barney's Version	Costume		
2011	Season of the Witch	Assistant costume designer		
2011	The Rite	Assistant costume designer		
2012	The Raven	Assistant costume designer, key dresser		
2013	Romeo & Juliet	Assistant costume designer		
2014	Divergent	Assistant costume designer, manufacturing supervisor		
2014	The Duke of Burgundy	Costume illustrator		
2015	Jupiter Ascending	Costume concept artist		
2016	Monolith	Costume designer	film festival releases	
2018	The Field Guide to Evil	Costume designer	film festival releases	

=== Television ===
List of works in television
Year	Series	Crew role	Notes	Source
2017	Year Million	Costume designer		
