= Unexpected (2005 film) =

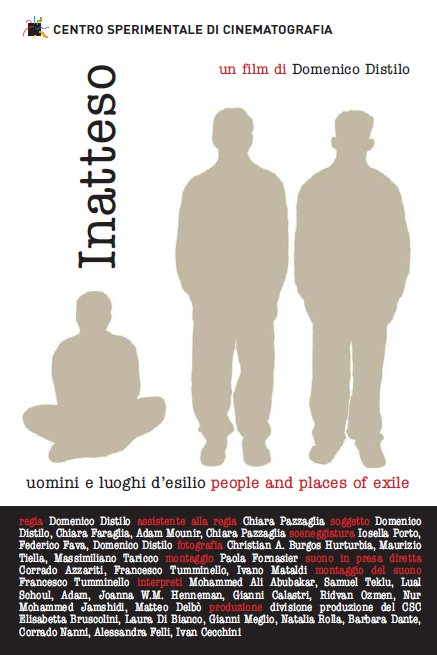
- poster
- Directed by: Domenico Distilo
- Written by: Domenico Distilo, Chiara Faraglia, Adam Mounir, Chiara Pazzaglia
- Produced by: Centro Sperimentale di Cinematografia
- Starring: Mohammed Alì Abubakar, Samuel Teklu, Lual Shoull, Joanna W.M. Henneman, Gianni Calastri, Ridvan Ozmen, Nur Mohammed Jamshidi, Matteo Delbò
- Release date: 2005
- Country: Italy
- Language: Italian

Unexpected (Italian: Inatteso) is an Italian 2005 documentary film written and directed by Domenico Distilo.

Distilo's diploma film from Centro Sperimentale di Cinematografia, Unexpected is a documentary on the demand for political asylum in Italy. It was screened in 2005 at the Festival dei Popoli in Florence, in 2006 at Berlinale (section Forum), an Alicante Film Festival, where the movie won the prize as best documentary, at the Arcipelago Film Festival in Rome, where it won the jury's special mention, at the El ojo cojo festival in Madrid, at the Unheard Voices festival in London and many other minor festivals.

Poet Erri De Luca composed a poem for the movie entitled Them (Loro).

== Synopsis ==
Those who seek political asylum in Italy fear for their very survival. They are forced to wait for several years, are forbidden to work and receive no assistance from the State. They are not provided with lodging, food or information. The refugees set up communes, building shelters, squatting derelict buildings near to centres of agricultural employment and frequently move around according to the harvest season. They survive thanks to their network of solidarity, voluntary organizations and black market work. Starting in Rome where a vast community has squatted the old state railway warehouses next to Tiburtina station, the film traces stopovers in the journey of a nomadic population of asylum seekers who, crossing the Italian peninsula, must head for the centres of seasonal harvesting in order to survive. A geographical exploration of the exile of heroes, deserters and refugees from the wars in postcolonial Africa: the new migrants of Europe.
