= Giuseppe Petitto =

Italian film director

Giuseppe Petitto (11 July 1969 – 2 September 2015) was an Italian film director.

== Career ==
Born in Catanzaro, Petitto was a graduate of the National Film School in Rome, Italy (Centro Sperimentale di Cinematografia), also holding a bachelor's degree in Law, he has served as a director, producer, and editor on several short and feature-length films both documentary and fiction, some of which have gained critical International acclaim.

Mostly active in human-rights related filmmaking, his former works have focused on children's rights abuse, civilian war victims, mental disorders, international politics, corruption and were produced in collaboration with European and American broadcasters such as BBC, ZDF, RAI, PBS, TVO, YLE, and CANAL+.

== Awards ==
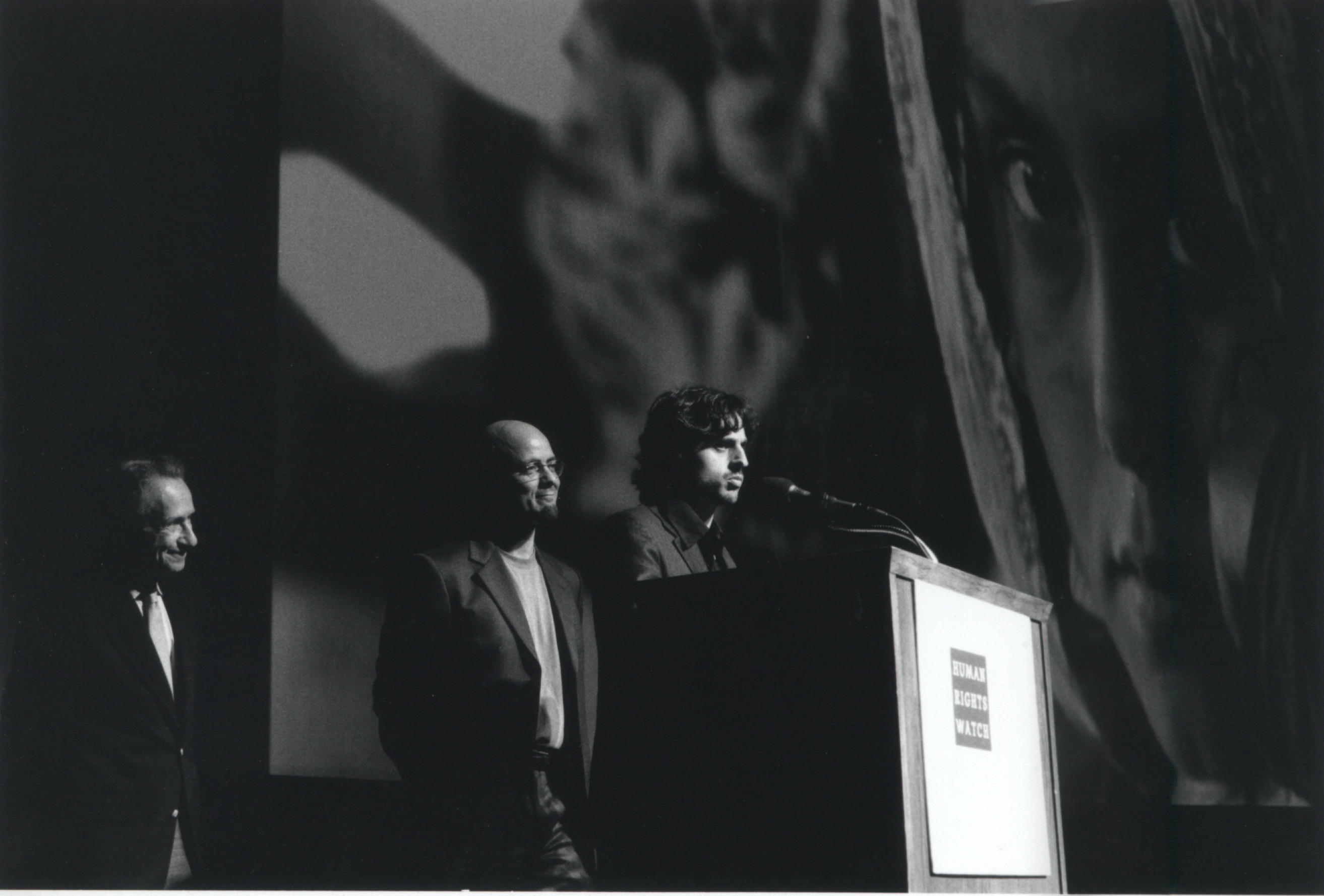
Arthur Penn (left) presents to Giuseppe Petitto (right) the Human Rights Watch Nestor Almendros Award for courage and commitment in human rights filmmaking. Lincoln Center, New York

On 13 June 2001 at the Alice Tully Hall of the Lincoln Center in New York City, he received the Human Rights Watch Nestor Almendros Award for courage and commitment in human rights filmmaking. Presenting the award to the filmmaker was venerable U.S. director Arthur Penn, who praised the documentary, saying, "Making a documentary like this, takes another kind of courage. It takes the courage to say that this story is not known widely enough... This story needs to be told. This is a film that never flinches; I promise you." Source: Human Rights Watch

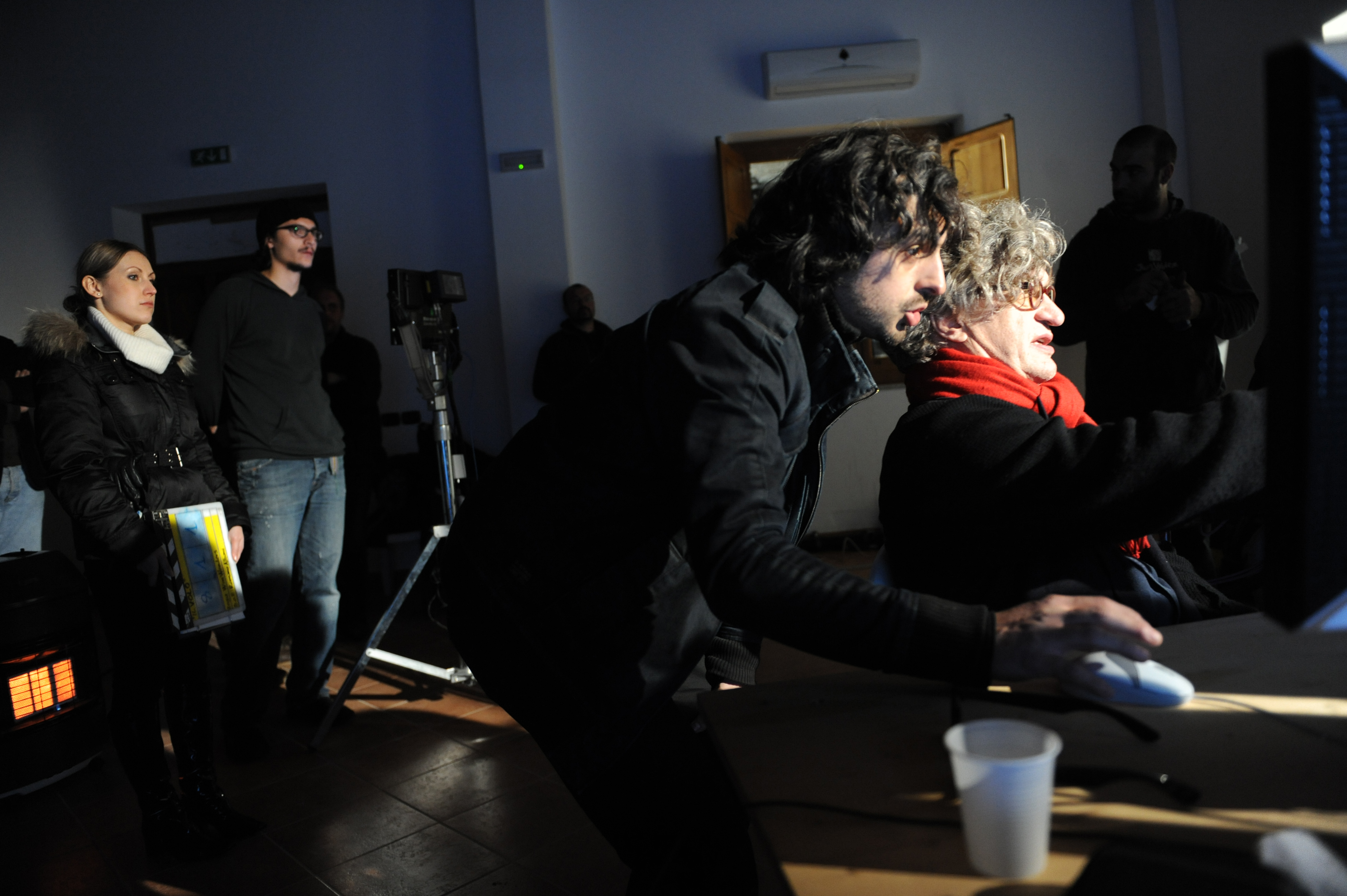
Giuseppe Petitto at work with Wim Wenders

He received a public endorsement by Martin Scorsese that read: "This is a brave, intelligent, tough movie that must be seen, now more than ever. Much more than just a piece of reporting, it is a very human portrait of the people of Afghanistan, and the horror of living in a state of never-ending war." Source: Human Rights Watch

=== Other awards ===
Phoenix Award for best documentary (Cologne Conference 2001), Special mention of the jury, and Audience Award at the One World Film Festival (Prague 2001), Best Feature length Documentary Award at the Vancouver film festival 2001, Columbine Award for Best Documentary at the Moondance International Film Festival (Colorado, USA), 2001 Freedom of Expression Honor by The U.S. National Board of Review, Silver Wolf Award (IDFA International Documentary Film Festival Amsterdam 2000), Actual Award Barcelona 2000, Daunbailò Award at the Genova Film Festival 2002, UNICEF Award at the Rome Independent Film Festival 2002, Cipputi Award at the Torino Film Festival - DOC 2002 competition, Special Mention of the jury at the Festival Internaciònal de cine e derechos umanos 2003 (Barcelona), Golden Spike Award at the Social World Film Festival 2011.

== Death ==
According to nuovacosenza.com, he died in a car accident on 2 September 2015. Petitto was driving a car that collided with a truck on state road 106 in Italy near Pietragrande.

== Sources ==
The New York Times (June 15, 2001; November 18, 2001; November 23, 2001), The Guardian (August 27, 2002), The Los Angeles Times (October 3, 2001), Volkskrant (November 2002), Der Spiegel (November 2001), The New Yorker (November 27, 2001), San Francisco Examiner (March 15, 2002), San Francisco Chronicle (March 15, 2002), San Francisco Bay Guardian (March 2002), Variety (November 30, 2001), Indiewire (June 15, 2001), The Hollywood Reporter (January 7, 2002), La vanguardia (Barcelona, November 12, 2003).
