= Dinita Gohil =

British actress (born 1985/1986)

- Born: 1985/1986 (age 39–40); Hodge Hill, Birmingham, England
- Education: Royal Holloway, University of London; Guildhall School of Music and Drama (MA)
- Occupation: Actress
- Years active: 1999–present

Dinita Gohil (born 1985/1986) is a British actress. She is best known for her performance as Amanda in the satirical film Greed (2019), and on-stage as Viola in the Royal Shakespeare Company production of Twelfth Night (2017–2018).

== Early life ==
Dinita Gohil was born in Hodge Hill, Birmingham. She was educated at Sutton Coldfield Grammar School for Girls, and later studied Spanish and French language at Royal Holloway, University of London. Gohil received a Master of Arts from the Guildhall School of Music and Drama, where she studied acting for three years.

== Career ==
Before acting, Gohil worked as a translator. In 1999, Gohil began her on-screen acting career in the post-apocalyptic miniseries, The Last Train as Anita Nixon. In 2017, Gohil played Sajani in the National Geographic documentary and science fiction television series, Year Million.

From 2017 to 2018, Gohil played Viola in the Royal Shakespeare Company production of Twelfth Night, written by William Shakespeare. In a three-star review for The Guardian, Michael Billington called Gohil's performance "the best performance of the evening, [...] a bright-eyed figure who surrenders happily to Orsino's kisses and who delivers the famous "willow cabin" speech with a level of rapture I have not heard in ages."

In 2019, Gohil played a leading role in the 2019 satirical film Greed as Amanda, a personal assistant of Sir Richard McCreadie (played by Steve Coogan). In April 2020, The Royal Shakespeare Company released the 2017 production of Twelfth Night, with Gohil as Viola, on the streaming service Marquee TV.

In September 2023, Gohil played Annette Raleigh in the Lyric Theatre, Hammersmith production of God of Carnage alongside Freema Agyeman.

== Filmography ==
=== Television ===
Year	Title	Role	Notes
1999	The Last Train	Anita Nixon	Main cast
2014	Doctors	Penny Glover	Episode: "Dorian Blue"
2016	Call the Midwife	Jamila Shahjee	Episode: "Series 5, episode 4"
2016	New Blood	PC Louise Tunstall	Episode: "Case 1, Part 3"
2016	Our Girl	Saira Abbasi	Episode: "Afterwards"
2017	Year Million	Sajani	Documentary series, main cast
2019	Moving On	Sarah	Episode: "By Any Other Name"
2019	MotherFatherSon	Nurse Beth	1 episode
2019	Clink	Sami Gilani	3 episodes
2020	Flack	Narinda	Episode: "Danny & Deepak"
2020	Twelfth Night	Viola	2017 RSC production of Twelfth Night
2022	Our House	Lucy Vaughan	1 episode
2022–2025	The Sandman	Fate Maiden	Recurring role
2022	Treason	Zoe	Supporting role
2023	Silent Witness	Bela Nasir	2 episodes
2024	DI Ray	Amara Dhawan	Recurring role (series 2)
2024	The Road Trip	Cherry	Main cast
2026	Under Salt Marsh	Nisha Jones	Miniseries, main cast

=== Film ===
Year	Title	Role	Notes
2015	Kill Your Friends	MTV Newsreader	
2016	The Infiltrator	Farhana Awan	
2017	The Snowman	Linda	
2017	The Boy with the Topknot	Kiran Chahal	
2019	Greed	Amanda	

=== Audio ===
Year	Title	Role	Notes
2023	Doctor Who: The Ninth Doctor Adventures	Sahdna Chand, Marla	Episode: "The Colour of Terror" (Series 2, #4.1)

== Stage ==
Year	Title	Role	Notes
2017–2018	RSC Live: Twelfth Night	Viola	
2023	God of Carnage	Annette	
