= Francesco Foschi =

Italian painter (1716–1780)

Francesco Foschi (1716 – 21 February 1780) was an Italian painter best known for painting winter landscapes.

== Biography ==
He was born in Ancona in the Marche. He moved to Rome in 1729 and encountered the works of other painters of veduta. He died in Rome. He should not be confused with the 16th century Florentine portrait artist, Pier Francesco Foschi. His surname has also been written as Toschi

Francesco had four brothers that were also painters: Carlo, Giacomo, Orazio, and Lorenzo.

== Sources ==
- Grassi Studio abstract

== Gallery ==
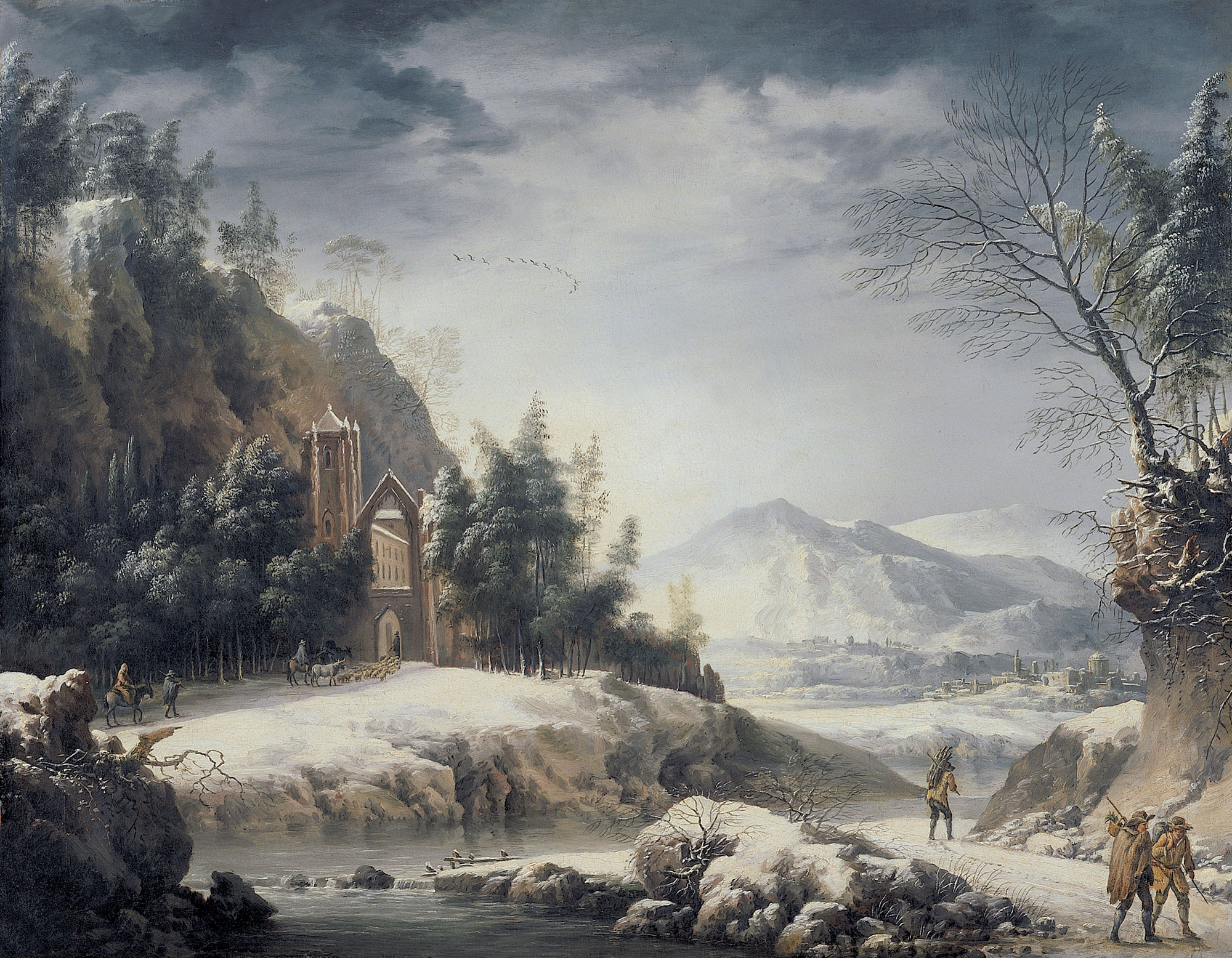

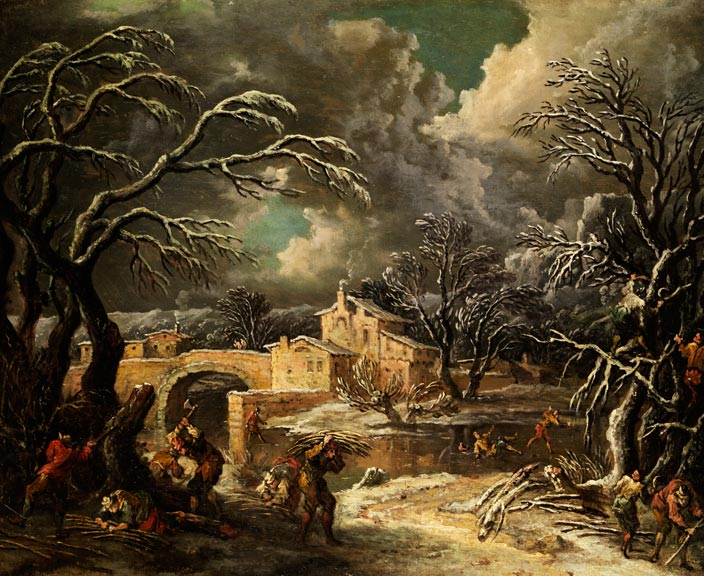

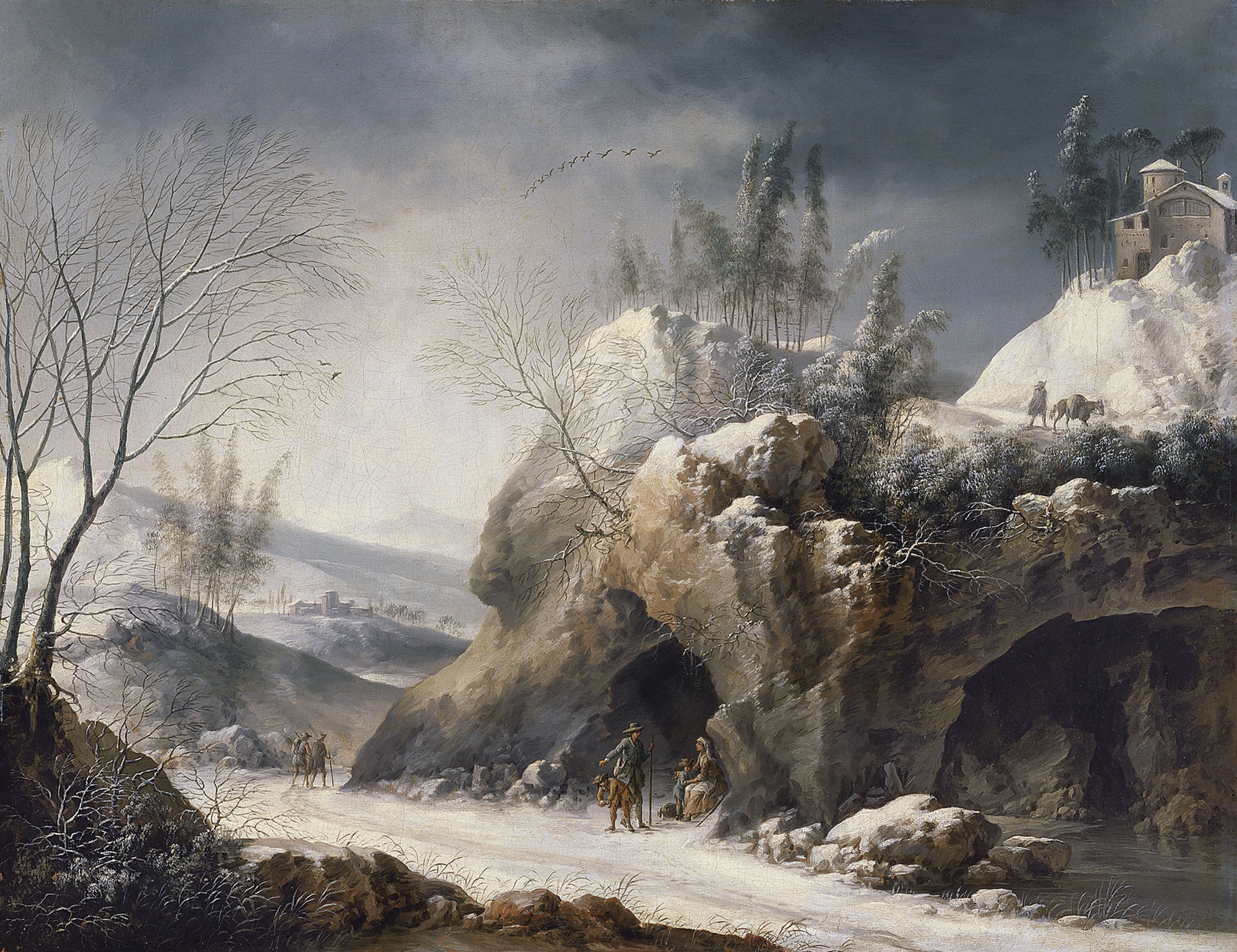

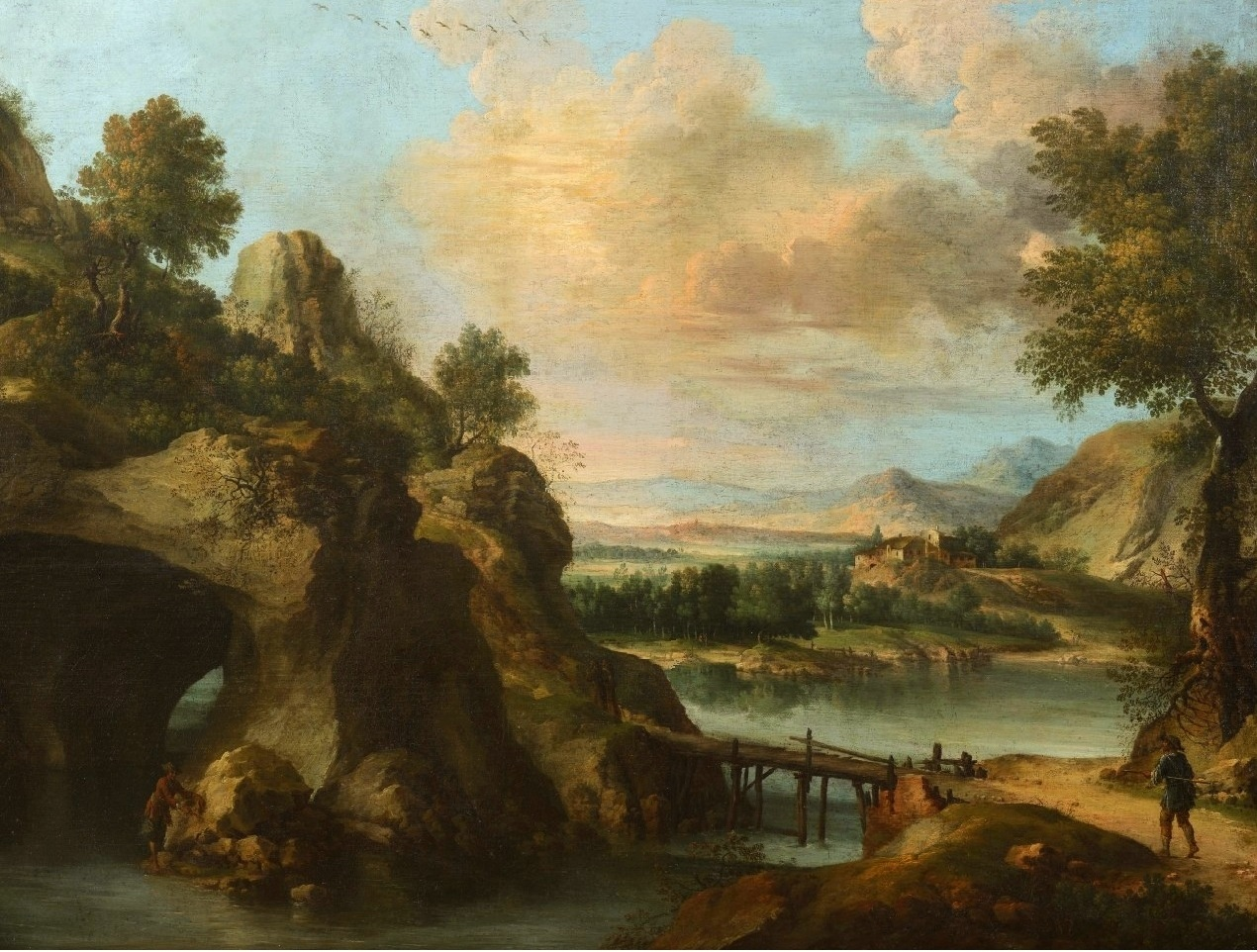

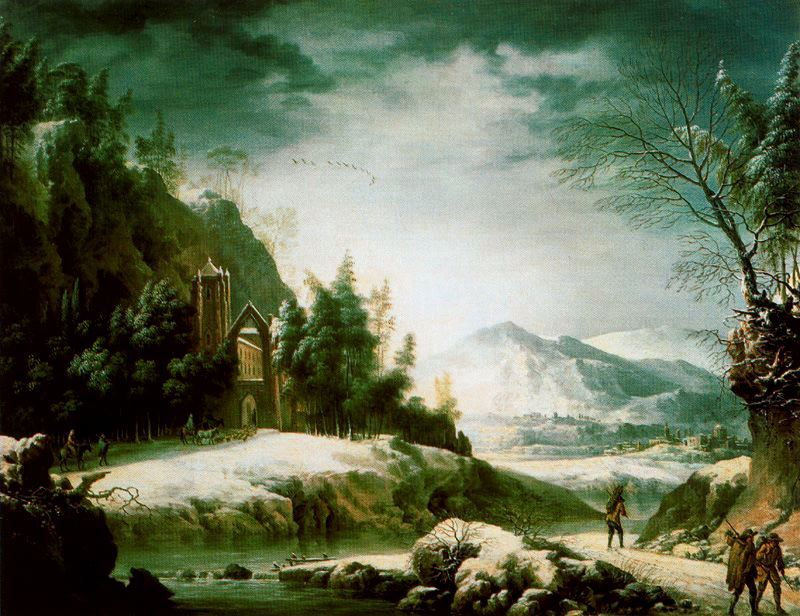

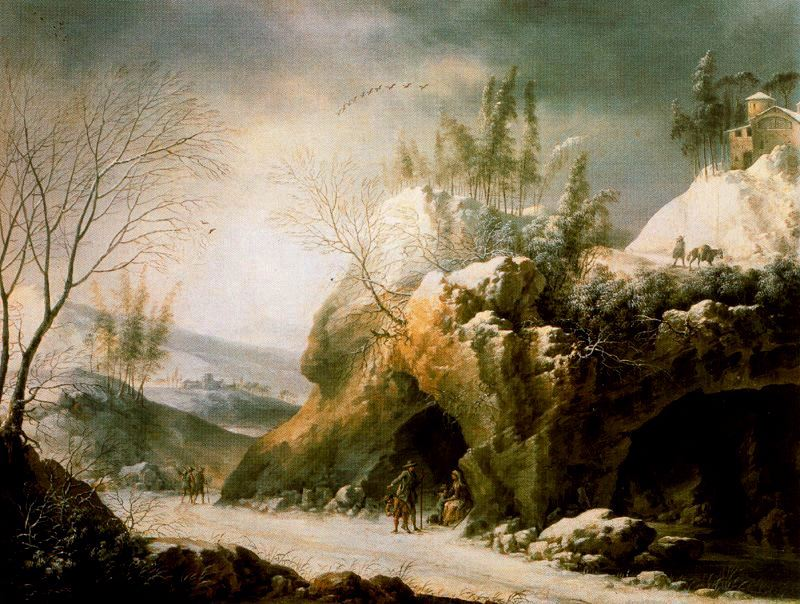

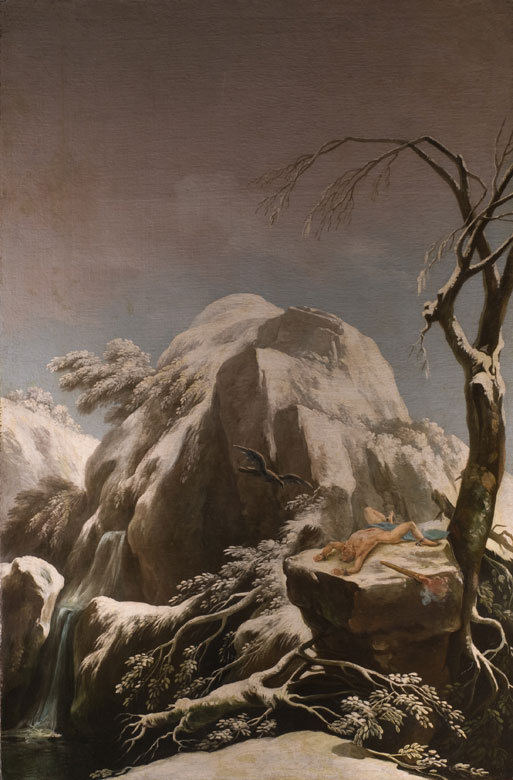
Prometheus Chained to Caucasus

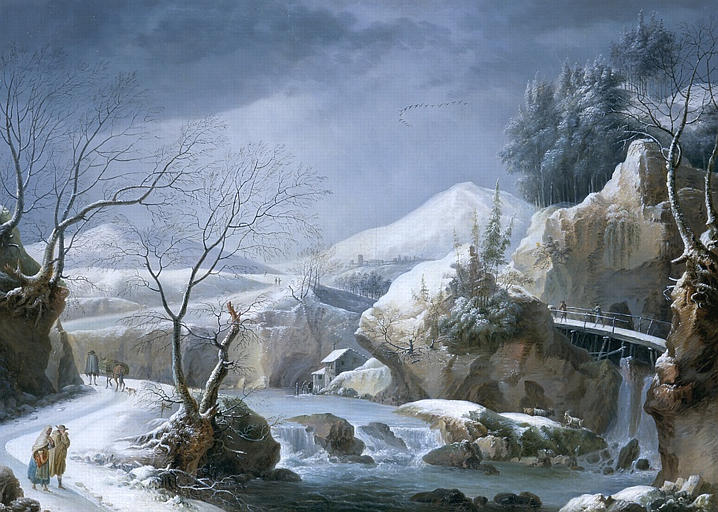
