= Katrina Bowden =

American actress (born 1988)

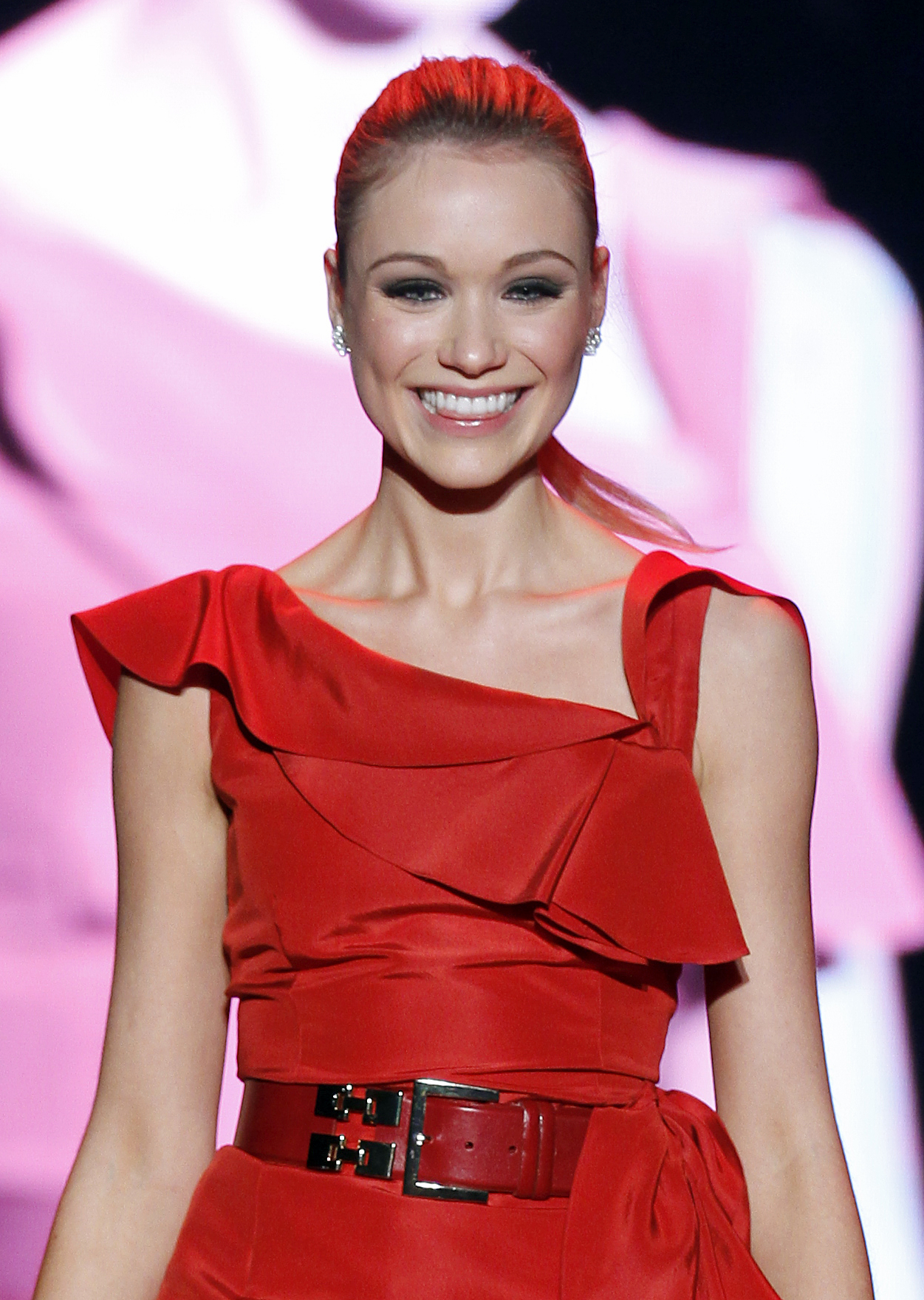
- Bowden in 2011
- Born: September 19, 1988 (age 38); Wyckoff, New Jersey, U.S.
- Other name: Katie Bowden
- Occupation: Actress
- Years active: 2005–present
- Spouse(s): Ben Jorgensen (m. 2013; div. 2020) Adam Taylor (m. 2024)
- Children: 1

Katrina Bowden (born September 19, 1988) is an American actress. After a two-episode arc on the ABC soap opera One Life to Live (2006), she received mainstream recognition for her recurring, later main, role as Cerie on the NBC sitcom 30 Rock (2006–2013). As part of the ensemble cast, Bowden won the Screen Actors Guild Award for Outstanding Performance by an Ensemble in a Comedy Series in 2009.

Following her breakout on 30 Rock, Bowden starred in the horror film The Shortcut (2009) and had a supporting role in the comedy film Sex Drive (2008). In the 2010s, she starred in the films Tucker & Dale vs. Evil (2010), Piranha 3DD (2012), Scary Movie 5 (2013), Nurse 3D (2013), and Monolith (2016), as well as supporting roles in the comedy films American Reunion (2012) and Movie 43 (2013). Bowden had a main role as Fortune on the TNT television series Public Morals (2015).

In the late 2010s, Bowden began starring as Florence "Flo" Fulton on the CBS soap opera The Bold and the Beautiful (2019–2021). In the 2020s, she starred in the films Great White (2021), Born a Champion (2021), Senior Moment (2021), and The Unholy Trinity (2024).

== Early life ==
Katrina Bowden was born on September 19, 1988, in Wyckoff, New Jersey, where she was also raised.

== Career ==
In 2006, Bowden landed her first acting role in a two-episode arc on ABC's daytime soap opera One Life to Live as Britney. She has since guest-starred on shows such as Law & Order: Special Victims Unit and Ugly Betty. Bowden's breakthrough role came when she was cast as a recurring character on the Emmy Award-winning television series 30 Rock, which premiered on October 11, 2006, on NBC. She portrayed the attractive receptionist Cerie, and with the cast received seven Screen Actors Guild Award nominations and one win. She signed on as a regular for the show's second season in 2007, and appeared in the series through to its series finale in January 2013.

She appears in the music videos "Dance, Dance" by Fall Out Boy, as well as "After Hours" by We Are Scientists, and "Miss Jackson" by Panic! at the Disco.

In 2008, Bowden made her film debut in the Summit Entertainment comedy film Sex Drive, released to theatres on October 17, 2008. The following year, Bowden starred in two low-budget straight-to-DVD projects The Shortcut and Ratko: The Dictator's Son. In 2010 Bowden starred in the widely acclaimed horror-comedy film Tucker & Dale vs. Evil as Allison.

In April 2011, Bowden was voted as Esquire Magazine's Sexiest Woman Alive. She was also the face of the Jordache television campaign that made its premiere in September 2011. In 2012, Bowden was cast as Mia in American Reunion. Also in 2012, Bowden appeared in the horror films Piranha 3DD and Hold Your Breath and Nurse 3D in 2013. In 2018, she played the lead role in the Hallmark Channel movie Love on the Slopes. In 2021, she starred in Great White, an Australian survivor horror film.

== Personal life ==
In May 2013, Bowden married musician and singer Ben Jorgensen, of the band Armor for Sleep. They divorced in December 2020. She got engaged to her boyfriend, Adam Taylor, in Positano, Italy, in September 2023. They married in Hawaii on November 8, 2024. In May 2025, they announced she was pregnant with their first child. On October 12, 2025, Bowden gave birth to their daughter.

== Filmography ==
=== Film ===
Year	Title	Role	Notes
2008	Sex Drive	Ms. Tasty	
2009	Ratko: The Dictator's Son	Holly	Direct-to-video film
2009	The Shortcut	Christy	Direct-to-video film
2010	Tucker & Dale vs. Evil	Allison	
2012	American Reunion	Mia	
2012	Piranha 3DD	Shelby	
2012	Hold Your Breath	Jerry	Direct-to-video film
2013	Movie 43	Girl on Blind Date	
2013	Scary Movie 5	Natalie	
2013	Nurse 3D	Danni	
2013	A True Story	Deanna	
2014	Hard Sell	Bo	
2016	Monolith	Sandra	also known as Trapped Child (2017 film)
2016	The Last Film Festival	Young Starlet	
2018	Fishbowl California	Tess	
2019	The Divorce Party	Jan	
2020	The Orchard	Juliet Delaney	also known as Hunter's Moon
2021	Great White	Kaz	
2021	Born a Champion	Layla	
2021	Senior Moment	Kristen	
2023	Old Dads	Joanna	
2024	The Unholy Trinity	Julia	
TBA	Killing Diaz	Deanna	

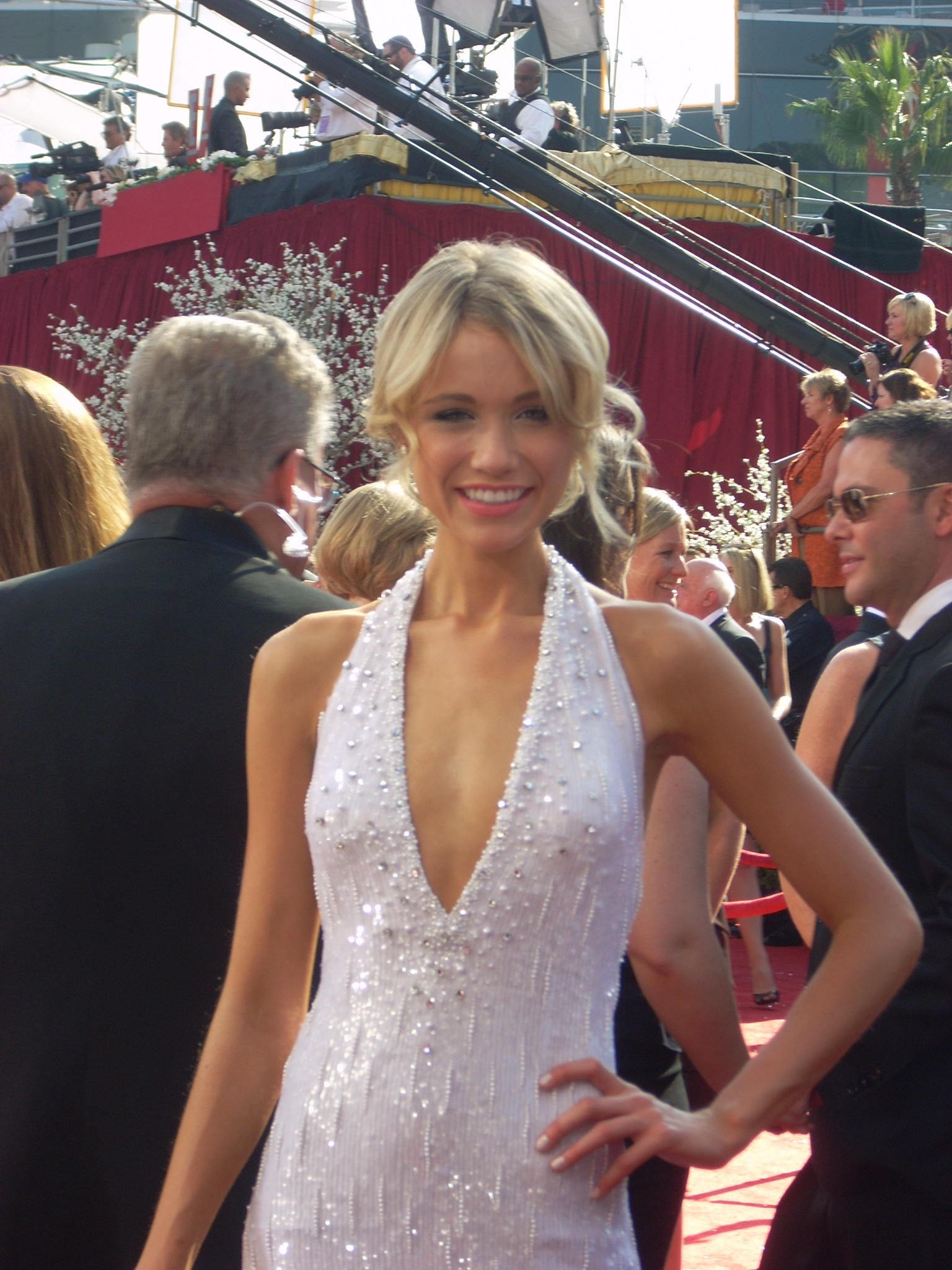
Bowden at the Emmy Awards at Nokia Theater on September 21, 2008.

=== Television ===
Year	Title	Role	Notes
2006	Law & Order: Special Victims Unit	Danna Simpson	Episode: "Gone"
2006	One Life to Live	Britney Jennings	2 episodes
2006–2013	30 Rock	Cerie	Main role
2007	Reckless Behavior: Caught on Tape	Bronson Girl	TV movie (Lifetime)
2007	Psych	Coed	Episode: "Scary Sherry: Bianca's Toast"
2010	Ugly Betty	Heather	Episode: "Smokin' Hot"
2010	Nick Swardson's Pretend Time	Hilary	Episode: "I Just Got Voodoo'd"
2011	CollegeHumor Originals	Julie	Episode: "I'm Such a Nerd"
2012	New Girl	Holly	Episode: "Secrets"
2015	I Killed My BFF	Shane Riley	TV movie (Lifetime)
2015	Public Morals	Fortune	Main role
2017	Framed by My Fiance	Jenny	TV movie (Lifetime)
2017	Once Upon a Date	Tiffany Holland	TV movie
2018	Dirty John	Cindi	Episode: "Shrapnel"
2018	Love on the Slopes	Alex	TV movie (Hallmark)
2019	I Am the Night	Blonde Woman	Episode: Pilot
2019–2021	The Bold and the Beautiful	Florence "Flo" Fulton	Main role
2021	The Young and the Restless	Flo Fulton	Guest role: January 21, 2021
2022	The Most Colorful Time of the Year	Michelle	TV movie (Hallmark)
2024	A Christmas in New Hope	Victoria	TV Movie

=== Music videos ===
Year	Title	Role	Artist
2005	"Dance, Dance"	N/A	Fall Out Boy
2006	"Good Day"	N/A	Jewel
2008	"After Hours"	N/A	We Are Scientists
2013	"Miss Jackson"	Witch	Panic! at the Disco

=== Awards and nominations ===
Year	Award	Category	Nominated work	Result
2008	Screen Actors Guild Awards	Outstanding Performance by an Ensemble in a Comedy Series (shared with the cast)	30 Rock	Nominated
2008	Gold Derby Awards	Ensemble of the Year (shared with the cast)	30 Rock	Nominated
2009	Gold Derby Awards	Ensemble of the Year (shared with the cast)	30 Rock	Nominated
2009	Screen Actors Guild Awards	Outstanding Performance by an Ensemble in a Comedy Series (shared with the cast)	30 Rock	Won
2010	Screen Actors Guild Awards	Outstanding Performance by an Ensemble in a Comedy Series (shared with the cast)	30 Rock	Nominated
2011	Screen Actors Guild Awards	Outstanding Performance by an Ensemble in a Comedy Series (shared with the cast)	30 Rock	Nominated
2012	Fangoria Chainsaw Awards	Best Supporting Actress	Tucker & Dale vs. Evil	Nominated
2012	Screen Actors Guild Awards	Outstanding Performance by an Ensemble in a Comedy Series (shared with the cast)	30 Rock	Nominated
2013	Screen Actors Guild Awards	Outstanding Performance by an Ensemble in a Comedy Series (shared with the cast)	30 Rock	Nominated
2014	Screen Actors Guild Awards	Outstanding Performance by an Ensemble in a Comedy Series (shared with the cast)	30 Rock	Nominated
