= Nuketown =

Call of Duty multiplayer map

- Call of Duty: Black Ops location
- "Nuketown", as featured in Black Ops (2010)
- First appearance: Call of Duty: Black Ops (2010)
- Last appearance: Call of Duty: Black Ops 7 (2025)
- Created by: Treyarch
- Based on: United States nuclear test sites
- Genre: First-person shooter

In-universe information
- Other names: Nuketown 2025; Nuk3town; Alpha Omega; Nuketown '84
- Type: Neighbourhood
- Location: Nevada, United States (Black Ops)
- Locations: "Warhead"

"Nuketown" is a multiplayer map in the Black Ops subseries of Call of Duty, a first-person shooter video game franchise published by Activision. Set in a nuclear test town in the deserts of Nevada, the map features two symmetrical sides that are split down the middle by a road. Each side has a two-story house with a backyard, and the road has vehicles that provide additional cover. The map is very small, and combat is often frantic due to its small size. At the end of each multiplayer game played on the map, a nuclear bomb is dropped on the site, obliterating the contents of the map.

Inspired by real-world nuclear test sites constructed by the United States, which featured numerous faux buildings and neighborhoods of varying distance from the blast to analyze the effects of nuclear blasts on American towns, "Nuketown" has appeared in every subsequent Black Ops release, with the location being adjusted to fit the setting of each game.

The map has been met with a generally positive response from critics, praising its fast-paced combat and small design. There have been connections made between the iconography featured in "Nuketown" and real-world themes present during the Cold War era.

== Design ==
"Nuketown" is a multiplayer map originating from Call of Duty: Black Ops (2010), a first-person shooter video game developed by Treyarch and published by Activision. The map takes place in a nuclear test town in the deserts of Nevada, and is based on real-world nuclear test sites constructed by the United States in the 1950s. The map's design is very small and symmetrical, split into two sides by a road that runs through the middle, with each side having a brightly colored two-story house and an AstroTurfed backyard. On the road are numerous vehicles that provide additional cover, such as a school bus and a moving van. Similarly to real-world test sites, the map's houses are populated by fully-clothed mannequins.

At the end of each multiplayer game on "Nuketown", a nuclear bomb is detonated on top of the location, obliterating the contents of the map whilst the results of the match are displayed. Following the release of the first Black Ops title in 2010, "Nuketown" has reappeared numerous times, with the setting being adjusted to fit the theme of the respective game.

== History and appearances ==
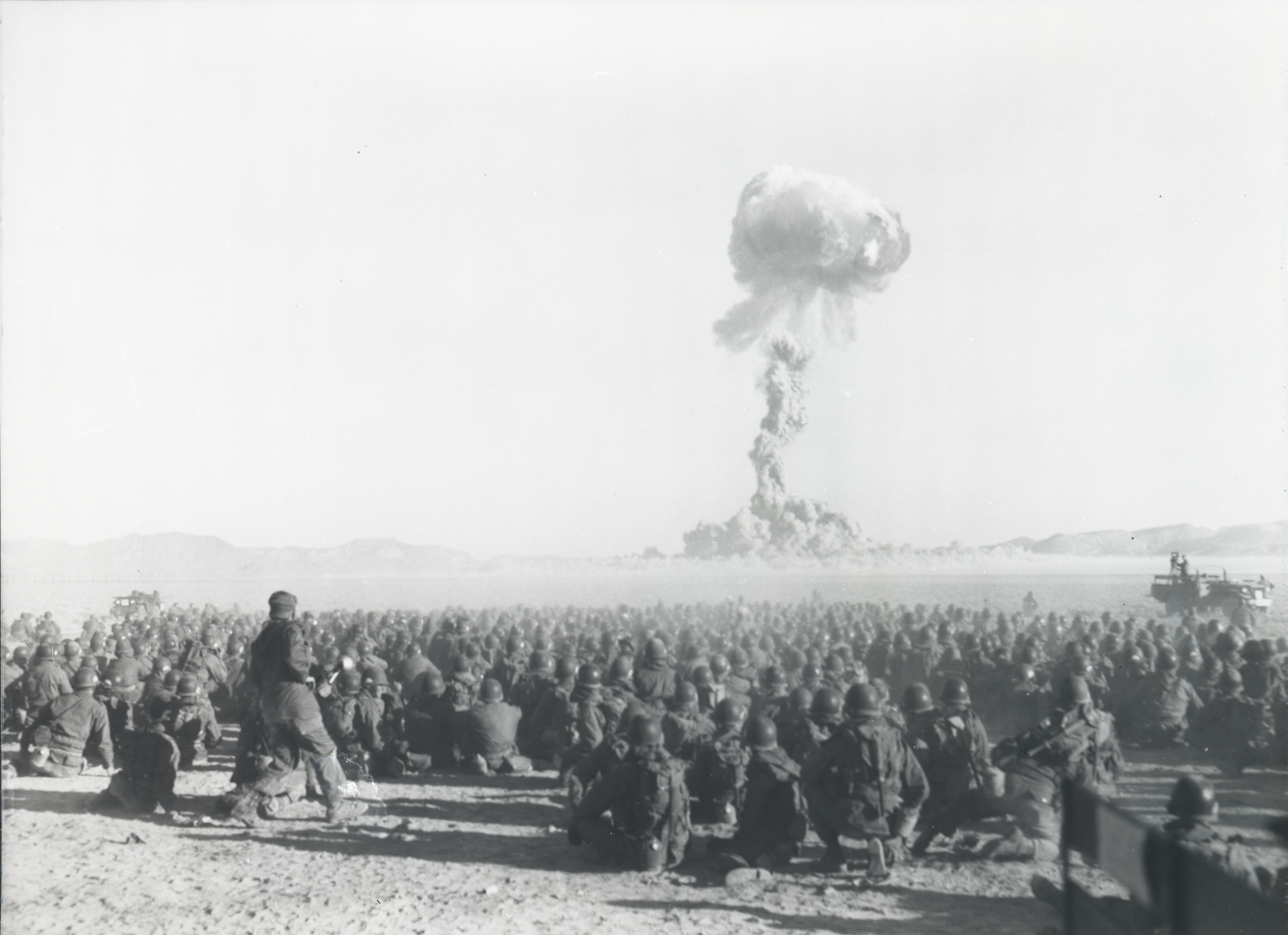
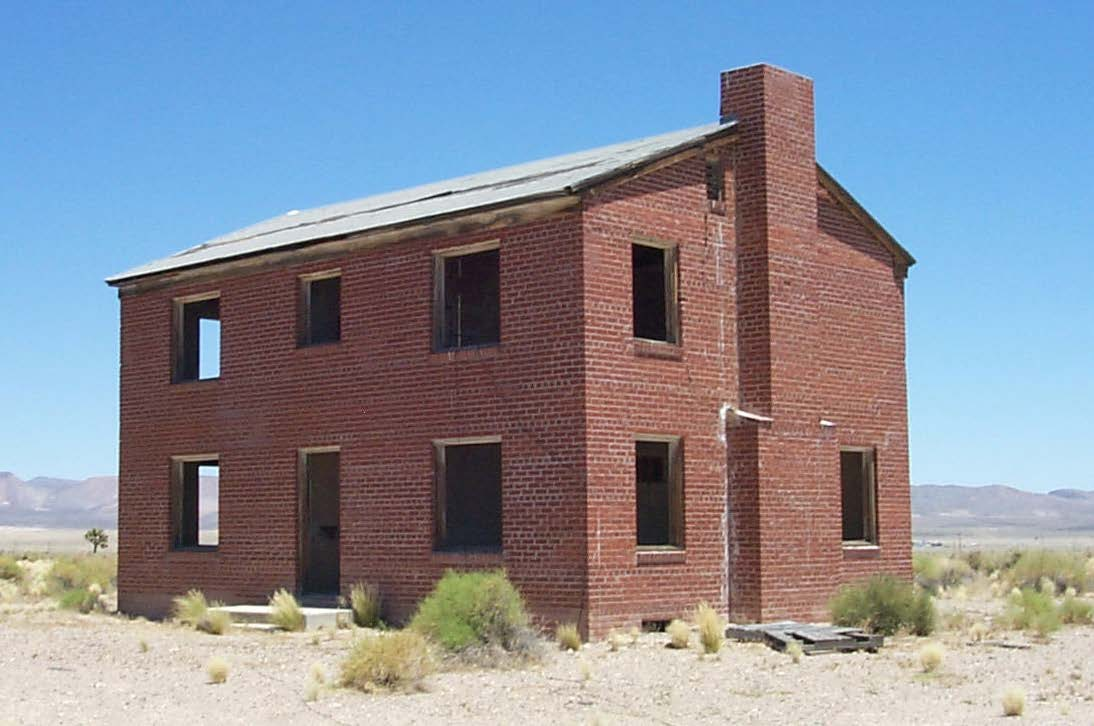
During the nuclear tests conducted in Nevada (left), the United States constructed numerous faux buildings and neighborhoods to test the impact of nuclear bombs on American towns (right).

"Nuketown" is based on real-world nuclear test sites that were constructed by the United States. Around five years following the atomic bombings of Hiroshima and Nagasaki, the United States established a nuclear test site in Nevada near Las Vegas, after testing in the Pacific Ocean became unfeasible after the Korean War. During these tests, the United States constructed various buildings of varying distances from the explosion to test the impact of nuclear warfare on American cities. These buildings, often arranged in locations nicknamed "doom towns", included grocery stores, gas stations, and houses built of varying materials. Each building was often excessively detailed and furnished, to the extent of featuring food supplies. Additionally, fully clothed mannequins were placed throughout the buildings to mimic people, partially to test the durability of clothing in extreme conditions. By the end of the tests, over 100 bombs were detonated.

These nuclear tests sites inspired the creation of a scene in Indiana Jones and the Kingdom of the Crystal Skull (2008), a film released shortly before the development of Black Ops began. In the scene, the titular character, Indiana Jones, ventures onto one such nuclear test site, and survives a nuclear blast by hiding inside of a fridge. According to designer David Vonderhaar, this scene inspired the developers to create "Nuketown". The original iteration of "Nuketown" included an Easter egg that would play the song "Sympathy for the Devil" by the Rolling Stones if players managed to decapitate each of the map's mannequins in fifteen seconds.

"Nuketown" reappeared in the game's sequel, Call of Duty: Black Ops II (2012); initially only available as a pre-order bonus. This version of the map—"Nuketown 2025"—departs from the 1950s aesthetic of its predecessor, in favour of a 1960s aesthetic. A month later, a version of the map that was playable in the game's Zombie mode was released. In January 2013, "Nuketown 2025" was made available to all players following the release of the Revolution map pack, although players on the Wii U version of the game wouldn't receive the map until August 2014.

Alongside the release of Call of Duty: Black Ops III (2015), "Nuketown" was once again available as a pre-order bonus. To accommodate for the game's new movement mechanics, the map received a redesign to emphasize vertical movement. The map's setting was also changed from the Cold War to that of the futuristic setting, set in 2065. This version of the map was known as "Nuk3town".

"Nuketown" again returned in Call of Duty: Black Ops 4 (2018), with the setting being changed to a Russian test site set on top of an underground bunker. Additionally, the version of "Nuketown" made for the Zombies mode in Black Ops II was remade in Black Ops 4, titled "Alpha Omega".

A fifth redesign of the map was included with Call of Duty: Black Ops Cold War (2020), entitled "Nuketown '84". Set during 1984, this version of the map returned the map to the desert setting in the original Black Ops, taking place in an abandoned replica of the original test site which had since fallen into disrepair and was converted into a legitimate commune. This version of the map features a large amount of real-world symbolism and iconography in the form of graffiti. A sixth version of "Nuketown" was included in Call of Duty: Black Ops 6 (2024), alongside two new, original maps inspired by "Nuketown", titled "Warhead" and "Area 99"; the latter of which formed part of Black Ops 6's integration into Warzone.

A remastered version of "Nuketown 2025" was included in Call of Duty: Black Ops 7 (2025).

== Themes and analysis ==
Jeremy Peel, writing for GamesRadar+, believed that depictions of real-world material and the fast-paced action of "Nuketown" could be viewed as an metaphor of the Cold War and the idea of mutual-assured destruction. He believed that no matter what the outcome of the supposed battle was, everybody would die in the end and no achievements of an individual would matter, both in "Nuketown" as well as the real world. He also commented the additional ending cutscene to "Nuketown '84", where an arcade machine is obliterated by the bomb as well, for "juxtaposing the bright, chirrupy presentation of U.S. capitalism with the apocalyptic scenario that loomed over it for half a century." Peel wrote this critique to be similar to Vault Boy's role in the Fallout franchise. Ryan Smith of the Gameological Society viewed the usage of the nuclear bomb in the map similarly, describing it to "[make] all of the desperate head-shooting and flag-capturing seem a bit futile", before players would inevitably vote to play the map again.

Elaborating further on "Nuketown '84" in particular, Peel pointed out that a lot of the newly added graffiti to the map featured symbols of the British Campaign for Nuclear Disarmament (C.N.D.), a group primarily prominent in the early 1980s before Margaret Thatcher was re-elected, leading to the decline of the movement in 1983. Peel thought that 1984 was likely chosen as the maps setting for being what he considered "the end of hope," though also noted it could've been chosen because of George Orwell's novel named for the year. Peel declared that the map could possibly be interpreted in two ways: as an analogy of how the decade played out based on its graffiti, or as a black comedy critique of explosives and fast-paced fighting "crapping all over foolish notions of world peace."

== Reception and legacy ==
"Nuketown" has been described as one of the most iconic maps in the Call of Duty series. Kotaku's Alyssa Mercante wrote that "Nuketown" was one of the two most iconic maps in the series—the other being "Shipment" from the Modern Warfare sub-series. Several outlets have considered "Nuketown" to be amongst the best maps in the Call of Duty series, due to its fast-paced nature, with Kotaku Australia and Red Bull considering it one of the greatest multiplayer maps in video game history.

Kotaku's Patricia Hernandez wrote that maps such as "Nuketown" best fit the mechanics of Call of Duty as well as player reaction speed, which revolves around close-quarters engagement between players. The Gameological Society's Ryan Smith described "Nuketown" as the fairest map in the Call of Duty series based on its symmetrical layout, though also one that could "devolve into chaos" as well as where death was inevitable. He also stated that, regardless of the player's skill, randomness would determine the map's outcomes instead of actual tactics and hand-to-eye coordination; Mercante wrote the map's small size led to "absurdly frantic gameplay," that made high death counts being inevitable no matter how skilled players were. GameRevolution's Toby Saunders and Cian Maher described the map as having absolute chaos "imbued in its very core," and GamesRadar+'s Jeremy Peel wrote that "Nuketown" was an iconic "cramped and frantic playground." Kotaku Australia's Alex Walker stated that, whilst he didn't think the map was overly balanced, it was one of the most replayable and "legendary" maps in video games.

Play was more critical of the map, describing it as one of the worst maps in first-person shooter games based on its small size, further declaring it to possibly be one of the "most frustrating" multiplayer maps. They believed that the map was not properly designed for Team Deathmatch modes, and that it was possible to predict who would win a match within the first fifteen seconds, with the prediction always coming true.
