= Greed (2019 film) =

- Theatrical release poster
- Directed by: Michael Winterbottom
- Written by: Michael Winterbottom
- Produced by: Damian Jones; Melissa Parmenter
- Starring: Steve Coogan; David Mitchell; Asa Butterfield; Dinita Gohil; Sophie Cookson; Jonny Sweet; Asim Chaudhry; Shirley Henderson; Isla Fisher
- Cinematography: Giles Nuttgens
- Edited by: Liam Hendrix Heath; Marc Richardson; Mags Arnold
- Music by: Harry Escott
- Production companies: Sony Pictures International Productions; Film4 Productions; Revolution Films; DJ Films
- Distributed by: Sony Pictures Classics (United States); Sony Pictures Releasing International (International)
- Release dates: 7 September 2019 (TIFF); 21 February 2020 (United Kingdom); 28 February 2020 (United States)
- Running time: 104 minutes
- Countries: United Kingdom; United States
- Language: English
- Budget: £5 million
- Box office: $1.4 million

Greed is a 2019 satirical black comedy film written and directed by Michael Winterbottom. The film stars Steve Coogan, David Mitchell, Asa Butterfield, Dinita Gohil, Sophie Cookson, Jonny Sweet, Asim Chaudhry, Shirley Henderson, and Isla Fisher. The film centres around Sir Richard McCreadie, played by Coogan, a billionaire high-street fashion mogul loosely based on Arcadia Group chairman Philip Green, and events surrounding the build-up to his 60th birthday celebrations on the Greek island of Mykonos.

Greed had its world premiere at the Toronto International Film Festival on 7 September 2019, and was released in the United Kingdom on 21 February 2020 by Sony Pictures Releasing International.

== Plot ==
The film takes a non-linear approach to the life of Sir Richard "Greedy" McCreadie, a billionaire fashion mogul. After a recent disastrous appearance at a government inquiry into financial and ethical abuse within the fashion industry, McCreadie has decided to publish his memoirs and has hired Nick, a mild-mannered journalist, to ghostwrite it for him. Nick's research into McCreadie's background leads to flashbacks charting the billionaire's rise from relatively humble (though still affluent and privileged) circumstances as an outcast and rebellious student at an unnamed British public school, to his rise in the 1970s and 1980s as a powerful high-street fashion merchant, to the government hearing. It becomes clear that, despite McCreadie's self-image as a successful and quick-witted businessman with multiple celebrity friends, much of his wealth is in fact based on ruthless exploitation and financial corruption, including a reliance on sweatshops in Southeast Asia for his fashion lines, tax avoidance, asset stripping and similar ethically questionable financial dealings.

The present of the film focusses on the build-up to McCreadie's 60th birthday party, a Gladiator-themed celebration on the island of Mykonos, which is intended to allow McCreadie to relax after the interrogations. However, even there matters are not progressing smoothly; the centrepiece of the celebrations, a Roman arena where a mock-gladiatorial fight against a lion will be staged, is poorly constructed because lax local builders rely mainly on undocumented immigrant labour, and the lion itself is quite passive, much to McCreadie's chagrin. Furthermore, many of McCreadie's celebrity guests are distancing themselves from him due to the damage to his reputation, and a crowd of Syrian refugees have constructed a makeshift camp on the public beach adjoining his property and refuse to leave. Tensions also exist among his family, including his ex-wife Samantha, who acts as the public CEO of his family and for whom he continues to have lingering attraction despite having subsequently married Naomi, a much younger trophy wife; his daughter Lily, who is starring with her boyfriend Fabian in a reality-TV show being filmed alongside the celebrations; and his neglected son Finn, who holds an Oedipal obsession with replacing his father.

As he writes the memoir, Nick struggles with his job of whitewashing McCreadie's public image in light of both his unethical business practices and, on a personal level, his rude and intimidating personality. He forms a friendship with Amanda, one of McCreadie's personal assistants, who is also struggling with the ethical dilemmas of working for McCreadie. After breaking down when McCreadie reveals that he wants his employees to wear Roman slave outfits to his party, Amanda reveals to Nick that her mother was an employee in one of McCreadie's sweatshops in Sri Lanka, but was fired by the manager when she was no longer physically able to work to McCreadie's requirements. She was subsequently killed after being forced to work in another sweatshop which eventually caught fire due to a lack of safety precautions.

On the night of the party, McCreadie cons the Syrian refugees into working for him with a three-card monte trick after his local employees down tools. During the lavish celebrations, some of the refugee children steal silverware and are confronted by McCreadie's employees, but Amanda manages to persuade their uncle to return the stolen items. Simultaneously, Finn steals some cocaine from Naomi and doses the lion's food with it. After Samantha rejects his advances, McCreadie drunkenly wanders into the arena and encounters the lion in its cage. Amanda, crossing paths with him, on impulse releases the lion, which mauls McCreadie to death in a drugged frenzy. Nick witnesses this event and helps Amanda escape without being discovered.

Following McCreadie's death, he becomes subject to numerous flattering eulogies, and Nick's project becomes a hagiographic biography. Finn takes over his father's role in the business, and it is implied that he will be just as duplicitous if not worse. Nick and Amanda meet and agree to keep Amanda's role in McCreadie's death secret; Amanda tells Nick that she views her action as not so different from the indirect role McCreadie played in her mother's death. Amanda goes to work at her new job: sewing at a Leicester sweatshop. The film ends with facts about exploitation and inequality within the fashion industry being shown over the credits.

== Cast ==
- Steve Coogan as Sir Richard McCreadie
  - Jamie Blackley as Young Richard McCreadie
- David Mitchell as Nick Morris
- Isla Fisher as Samantha, Lady McCreadie
- Sophie Cookson as Lily McCreadie
- Shirley Henderson as Margaret McCreadie
- Asa Butterfield as Finn McCreadie
- Dinita Gohil as Amanda
- Ollie Locke as Fabian
- Sarah Solemani as Melanie
- Shanina Shaik as Naomi, Lady McCreadie
- Manolis Emmanouel as Demetrious
- Asim Chaudhry as Frank the Lion Tamer
- Pearl Mackie as Cathy
- Tim Key as Sam
- Charlie Cooper as Neil
- Jonny Sweet as Jules
- Paul Ritter as Lewis
- Paul Higgins as Jim McBride
- Miles Jupp as Select Committee Chairman
- Stephen Fry as himself
- Caroline Flack as herself
- Pixie Lott as herself
- Ben Stiller as himself
- Colin Firth as himself
- Keira Knightley as herself
- Chris Martin as himself
- Louis Walsh as himself
- James Blunt as himself
- Keith Richards as himself

== Production ==
It was announced in November 2016 that Fox Searchlight was looking to acquire the distribution rights to the film, with Michael Winterbottom set as director and Sacha Baron Cohen cast.

No further development on the film was announced until September 2018, with the castings of Steve Coogan (replacing Baron Cohen), David Mitchell and Isla Fisher.

In December 2018, it was revealed that filming had concluded, with additional castings being revealed, including Sophie Cookson, Shirley Henderson, Asa Butterfield, and Stephen Fry.

== Release ==
Greed had its world premiere at the Toronto International Film Festival on 7 September 2019. Prior to, Sony Pictures Classics acquired US distribution rights to the film.

A trailer for the film was released on 5 December 2019. The film was released in the United Kingdom on 21 February 2020, a mere 6 days after the death of Caroline Flack, who cameos in the film.

=== Critical reception ===
On review aggregator Rotten Tomatoes, the film holds an approval rating of 49% based on 146 reviews, with an average rating of 5.6/10. The website's critics consensus reads: "Greed rarely hits quite as hard as it ought to, but solid laughs and a smartly assembled cast keep this one-percent satire entertaining." On Metacritic, the film has a weighted average score of 52 out of 100, based on 32 critics, indicating "mixed or average" reviews.
