= The Shortcut =

2009 American horror film

- Theatrical release poster
- Directed by: Nicholaus Goossen
- Written by: Dan Hannon; Scott Sandler
- Produced by: Scott Einbinder; Scott Sandler; Ingo Vollkammer; Brian Witten
- Starring: Andrew Seeley; Shannon Woodward; Dave Franco; Katrina Bowden
- Cinematography: Mark Irwin
- Edited by: Jake York
- Music by: Michael Suby
- Production companies: Leomax Entertainment; Scary Madison Productions; Dark Eye Entertainment
- Distributed by: Indigomotion (United States); Blue Sky Media (International)
- Release date: September 29, 2009
- Running time: 85 minutes
- Country: United States
- Language: English

The Shortcut is a 2009 American independent horror film directed by Nicholaus Goossen. The film stars Andrew Seeley, Shannon Woodward, Dave Franco, and Katrina Bowden. The plot centers on two brothers who discover a rarely used shortcut and learn its dark secret.

Dan Hannon and Scott Sandler developed the screenplay in 2008 for Scary Madison Productions, the newly formed horror division of Happy Madison Productions, the production company of Sandler's brother Adam, and Leomax Entertainment, who financed and co-produced the film. Released in North America by Indigomotion, a division of Leomax, on September 29, 2009, the film received mixed reviews and was a commercial failure. It ended up being the only film under the Scary Madison label, as it was retired in response to the film's failure. The film was released on DVD and Blu-Ray in North America by Anchor Bay Entertainment.

== Plot ==
In 1945 a young couple, Dougie and Irene are leaving the homecoming dance. The couple take a shortcut through the woods where they begin to make out. Irene wants to stop, but Dougie attempts to rape her. She manages to injure him, however, so he leaves. As Irene makes her way out of the shortcut, a young boy Benjamin attacks her, hitting her over the head with a rock and killing her. It is revealed that Benjamin has growing health issues and eventually begins to murder anyone he sees using the shortcut. Ivor and the rest of Benjamin's family then hide him away from the rest of the world, by shackling him to the basement by a chain around his neck.

Present day - Derek has recently moved to a new town and school and has befriended the feisty Lisa and Mark, while taking a liking to Christy. Meanwhile, at his school, Derek's brother Tobey tells a few of his classmates he got kicked out of his old school for fighting. The kids then dare Tobey to go through the shortcut which he does alone. As Tobey makes his way along, he comes across a dead dog and an old man who threatens him, causing him to run off.

Arriving home, Derek finds his brother Tobey covered in blood. Tobey tells Derek of the events on the shortcut, prompting Derek to go investigate, however, he has to leave to go to the fast food place where he and Mark work. When Derek tells Mark of the old man and the dog, Mark proceeds to tell Derek of the story of the old man who presumably killed people on the shortcut, yet nothing has ever been proven.

That night, Derek returns home to his grandma's house, whom the family have moved in with after the death of their dad. Derek's mom urges Derek to set a good example for Tobey. The next morning, Derek voices his annoyance of having to move to a new town again. While at school, Derek makes a move on Christy before he is approached by Taylor who has heard about the dead dog on the shortcut. Taylor tells him his dog has gone missing and believes the old man has killed his dog. The pair makes an arrangement to go to the shortcut that night together.

After dinner, Derek asks his Grandma about the shortcut, she warns him never to go there. Derek's mom then tells him that the old man on the shortcut is the last living member of the Hartley family who she thinks "just wants to be left alone." Taylor arrives and he and Derek go to the shortcut. They come out at the old man's house and sneak into his garage where they find dog tags, but none of the tags belong to Taylor's dog. The old man appears and they flee.

The following day, the group become determined to prove the old man is killing dogs. Derek and Lisa attempt to go back to the house, however, their plan is foiled when the old man does not leave his house. Later, at work, Derek is startled to see the old man. Derek is unable to determine if he recognizes him from the night before and he leaves soon after. Christy then arrives and also spots the old man. Derek manages to get an intrigued Christy's number so she can help with the investigation. After she leaves, Derek witnesses Mark being attacked and murdered, however, it's revealed this was a prank.

The next day, at Derek's house, Mark, Lisa and Taylor have met up with Derek. Taylor tells them that a friend's dog has also gone missing and that the old man is a veteran so he spends every Friday night at the memorial hall. Derek and Christy plan to spy on the old man at the memorial hall while the others go to investigate his house. Tobey then enters and Lisa teases him before leaving.

At the memorial hall, Derek and Christy bond before they make out and then realize that the old man has arrived. Derek phones the others to go to the house. Mark, Lisa and Taylor go through the shortcut and enter the old man's house through an unlocked window. Mark and Lisa find a room where Benjamin was presumably home-schooled. Mark and Taylor then go into the basement. Meanwhile, Christy and Derek realize the old man is leaving and they cannot get the others on the phone. Realizing they must beat the old man back to the house, they quickly begin to drive to the house. In the basement, Mark and Taylor discover an old man, Benjamin, shackled to a large wheel by a chain that is padlocked around his neck. Benjamin pleads for them to help him before the old man arrives back home. Lisa, Mark and Taylor take Benjamin and depart the house, but Benjamin is still bound. As they reach the shortcut, the chain restricts him from moving further. Taylor grabs a sledgehammer to break the chain while Benjamin and Mark hold the chain tight. As Taylor swings the sledgehammer, Benjamin yanks the chain, bringing Mark's hand in line with the swing, horribly disfiguring it. As Lisa attempts to get a signal on her phone to call help, Taylor tends to Mark. Suddenly, Benjamin hits Taylor over the head with the sledgehammer, killing him. Mark attempts to crawl away, but he too is killed with the sledgehammer. Lisa runs away as Benjamin manages to break the chain.

Derek and Christy arrive at the house and find a distraught Lisa who warns them they need to leave. Just then, the old man, revealed to be Ivor, arrives and crashes into the back of Derek and Christy's car and then tries to shoot them. Derek and Christy then flee the car and head for the forest as Lisa is shot in the leg. Derek urges Christy to escape, while he helps Lisa to run. As Christy runs deeper into the forest, she becomes lost. Suddenly she is attacked by Benjamin. As Derek and Lisa run through the forest, they fall into a pit of bones. Derek manages to climb out, but is unable to help Lisa out as Ivor arrives. Lisa hides under the bones but is spotted, and as she is about to be shot, Derek knocks out Ivor, allowing Lisa to escape.

Again running through the forest, the two stumble upon Benjamin who has captured Christy and has her bound by the neck with the remaining length of chain that is also still attached to his neck. Derek attempts to save her, but Benjamin breaks Christy's neck, killing her. Derek attacks Benjamin and is stabbed in the side while doing so. Derek quickly finds the sledgehammer and braces himself to hit Benjamin. Before Derek can hit Benjamin, Ivor turns up, he warns Derek not to hit Benjamin, and as Derek is about to, Ivor shoots Benjamin, while saying "he can no longer deal with having to hide Benjamin and kill anyone who happens to see him." Ivor then shoots himself, allowing Derek and Lisa to make their way out of the forest. Lisa becomes unable to walk due to her injury and Derek checks on it. As they are about to continue on, Lisa is stabbed to death by Tobey. Derek is shocked at first, but then says he is disappointed in his brother for allowing this to happen again, and reveals that Tobey murdered their father.

The two brothers then begin to drag Lisa's body into the forest. Derek reassures Tobey they will be able to cover up her death, implying that they both will eventually follow the same fate that Ivor and Benjamin did.

== Cast ==
- Drew Seeley as Derek
- Shannon Woodward as Lisa
- Dave Franco as Mark
- Katrina Bowden as Christy Doyle
- Raymond J. Barry as Ivor Hartley
  - Daniel Maslany as Young Ivor Hartley
- William B. Davis as Benjamin Hartley
  - Jeremy Bastion as Benjamin Hartley (1940s)
  - Benjamin DeWalt as Benjamin Hartley (1950s)
- Josh Emerson as Taylor
- Nicholas Elia as Tobey
- Wendy Anderson as Derek's Mom
- Maxine Miller as Derek's Grandma
- Tracylynn Olson as Irene
- Scott Lyster as Dougie
- Kent Allen as Frank Hartley
- Christine MacInnis as Joan Hartley
- Jonelle Gunderson as Sally (1950s)

== Production ==
On June 5, 2008, The Hollywood Reporter reported that Adam Sandler would be launching a horror-focused imprint called Scary Madison, through his production company Happy Madison Productions, and The Shortcut would be Scary Madison's first production, co-producing with Leomax Entertainment, whose theatrical distribution branch Indigomotion set to release it, with Shannon Woodward, Andrew Seeley and Dave Franco set to star. The Shortcut was cowritten by Happy Madison development writer Dan Hannon and Adam Sandler's brother Scott Sandler. Hannon recalled seeing his screenplay be "rewritten 50 million times" by other writers before production commenced. The Shortcut was originally conceived as an R-rated film, but Leomax only agreed to finance the film once Scary Madison agreed to produce a PG-13 film, and Leomax signed on to co-produce the film. Nicholaus Goossen signed on to direct, and production was announced to commence in August 2008, with plans for a theatrical release.

Preparation of the production design took 6 weeks, to develop settings covering the film's timeline, which spanned from the 1940s to 2009. While the film was written to take place in Scott Sandler's home state of New Hampshire, it was shot in and around Regina, Saskatchewan in Canada due to the film's low budget. The area only had two hours of night each day, which limited shooting. One of the locations was a government-run tree farm which served as the location for the scary woods. A 1960s basic bungalow served as the farmhouse location, and the interior of the farmhouse was dressed to appear for scenes set in the 1940s and 1950s. A hockey arena served as an interior, standing for the lower depths of the farmhouse.

Actor Drew Seeley sprained his ankle while filming, and wore an ankle brace. Goossen wanted to shoot a stronger amount of blood and gore, but the financiers wouldn't allow him, as they only wanted to submit the film to the MPAA once. The film received no product placement compensation, despite featuring name brands like Pepsi.

== Release ==
The poster was released at the 2008 American Film Market. The trailer was released on February 6, 2009. On February 9, Bloody Disgusting reported that The Shortcut would be distributed theatrically by Leomax, and Anchor Bay Entertainment (now under Lionsgate) picked up home video distribution for the film. In 2012, the film was passed uncut with a 15 rating by the BBFC, retitled Avoid the Shortcut. The film was a commercial failure. In response to the film's failure, Adam Sandler dissolved the Scary Madison label.

=== Critical reception ===
IGN gave the film 6 out of 10, writing, "The Shortcut is better than average despite its sloppiness and shortcomings. If only producers were sly enough to grant the production the edgier R-rating the story demanded and had allowed Goossen to shoot the missing bits of character needed to punctuate the film, The Shortcut might have been a genuinely great little horror film worthy of a theatrical release." DVD Talk gave the film 3 out of 5, writing, "The Shortcut is a fun little success. It concentrates on doing the things that other horror movies don't, and it does them effectively enough to sustain itself to the finish line."
