= Damon Dayoub =

American actor (born 1980)

- Born: July 14, 1980 (age 46); El Paso, Texas, U.S.
- Occupation: Actor
- Years active: 2009–present
- Spouse: Emily Montague (m. 2015)
- Children: 2

Damon Joseph Dayoub (born July 14, 1980) is an American actor.

== Career ==
Throughout the early 2010s, Dayoub had minor appearances in television series such as, The Whole Truth (2010), Brothers & Sisters (2011), Single Ladies (2012), NCIS (2013), Dallas (2014), and The Last Ship (2015). On March 4, 2015, it was announced that he would star opposite Mireille Enos in the Shonda Rhimes-produced series, The Catch. However, in the following months, it was announced that Dayoub exited from the project and the role was recast with Peter Krause. In July of that year, Dayoub was promoted to series regular on the ABC Family series, Stitchers. Dayoub played Detective Quincy Fisher, a major recurring character in the first season. He would remain a series regular through the show's third and final season. In 2016, Dayoub starred in the thriller film, Monolith.

In 2018, Dayoub played a recurring role, Cordova, in the NBC series, Chicago Fire. In addition, he starred in the Freeform holiday movie, The Truth About Christmas, opposite Kali Hawk. He was set to guest star in the HBO Max original series, Red Bird Lane; however, the series did not move forward. He went on to star in the Peacock original movie, The Housewives of the North Pole, in 2021.

In the early 2020s, Dayoub had recurring roles in Fox's Monarch and The CW's Gotham Knights.

== Filmography ==
=== Film ===
Year	Title	Role	Notes
2009	Dead End Falls	Dominick	
2016	Monolith	Carl	
2017	Moontrap: Target Earth	Daniel Allen	
2018	Danger One	Max	

=== Television ===
Year	Title	Role	Notes
2010	The Whole Truth		Episode: "When Cougars Attack"
2011	Brothers & Sisters	Firefighter	Episode: "Scandalized"
2011	The Protector	Matthew Wyatt	Episode: "Bangs"
2012	Single Ladies	Dr. Jason Weaver	Episode: "I Didn't Mean to Turn You On"
2013, 2019	NCIS	Adam Eshel	5 episodes
2013	Dallas	Vincente's Henchman	Episode: "Blame Game"
2014	The Last Ship	Navy Seal Damon	Episode: "It's Not a Rumor"
2014	Rizzoli & Isles	Boris Martin	Episode: "5:26"
2015–2017	Stitchers	Detective Quincy Fisher	Recurring role (season 1); series regular (seasons 2–3)
2017	Grace and Frankie	Ryan	2 episodes
2018	The Resident	Bobby Singer	Episode: "The Elopement"
2018	Chicago Fire	Firefighter Jake Cordova	4 episodes
2018	Deadly Matrimony	Leo Friedman	Television film
2018	The Truth About Christmas	George	Television film
2019	Suits	Nick Pavonotti	Episode: "The Greater Good"
2019	Dynasty	Mark Jennings	Episode: "Even Worms Can Procreate"
2021	The Housewives of the North Poll	Nick	Television film
2021, 2023	The Morning Show	Glen Corn	2 episodes
2022	Monarch	Jamie Burke	Recurring role; 8 episodes
2023	Gotham Knights	Lincoln March	Recurring role; 9 episodes
