= Centro Sperimentale di Cinematografia =

Italian national film school in Rome

Coordinates: 41°51′03″N 12°34′10″E

Centro Sperimentale di Cinematografia Experimental Center of Cinematography
- Rome; Italy

Information
- Established: 1935; 90 years ago
- Website: fondazionecsc.it

The Centro Sperimentale di Cinematografia (Experimental Center of Cinematography; CSC), also referred to as the Scuola Nazionale di Cinema (National Film School), is an Italian national film school headquartered in Rome, with satellite educational hubs in five other Italian regions.

It was established in 1935 and aims to promote the art and technique of cinematography and film.

== History ==
The center is the oldest film school in Western Europe. It was founded in Rome in 1935, during the Fascist era, by Benito Mussolini's head of cinema, Luigi Freddi, and his son, Vittorio Mussolini, as part of the Cinecittà Studios. He aimed to revive the Italian film industry, but he was also aware of the propaganda value of films. He created the slogan "Il cinema è l'arma più forte" ("cinema is the most powerful weapon").

During World War II, much of the original production equipment was stolen or destroyed by the Nazi occupiers. Many attempts to trace them in Germany and the Soviet Union after the war were unsuccessful.

Directors such as Michelangelo Antonioni and Giuseppe De Santis attended the school in the 1940s, and Marco Bellocchio would often visit during the 1960s.

In 1955, it became a founding member of the international CILECT (Centre International de Liaison des Ecoles de Cinéma et de Télévision) network of film schools.

== Description and aims ==
The Centro Sperimentale di Cinematografia (CSC), or in English the Experimental Center of Cinematography, also refers to itself as the Scuola Nazionale di Cinema. Headquartered in Rome, it also has five regional offices, in Abruzzo, Lombardy, Piedmont, Sicily, and Veneto.

It is known for its research and experimentation and offers a range of courses covering different aspects of making films. Courses are taught in English and Italian and run for three years. Entry is competitive, with only six to eight places available per class. It has a history of admitting a large number of international students and offers courses in acting, directing, cinematography, set design, costume design, screenwriting, sound design, film editing, film production, and, since 1983, animation.

Among the center's goals are the development of cinema and audiovisual art and techniques to levels of excellence through distinct sectors of the foundation itself, the National Film School, and the National Film Archive (Cineteca Nazionale). It is one of the oldest film archives in the world.

== Governance and funding ==
The CSC was and still is financed by the Italian government. In mid-2023, the government passed a decree that enabled it to appoint board members to the CSC. Over 600 Italian film professionals, including Nanni Moretti, Marco Bellocchio, Paolo Sorrentino, Luca Guadagnino, and Alice Rohrwacher signed an open letter, which was published in the press. President Marta Donzelli, along with two board members, resigned in protest against the new legislation, which also abolished the position of the director-general. In August 2023, minister of culture Gennaro Sangiuliano announced the appointment of actor Sergio Castellitto as the new president, and a number of new board members, including Pupi Avati and Giancarlo Giannini.

As of January 2024, Adriano De Santis is head of the school.

== Notable people ==
The school's mentors have included Piero Tosi (costumes), Giuseppe Rotunno (photography), and Giancarlo Giannini (acting).

Alumni include:

=== Directors ===
- Michelangelo Antonioni
- Giuseppe De Santis
- Luigi Zampa
- Pietro Germi
- Francesco Maselli
- Nanni Loy
- Folco Quilici
- Christian Filippella
- Domenico Distilo
- Lucio Fulci
- Emidio Greco
- Carlo Verdone
- Francesca Archibugi
- Liliana Cavani
- Umberto Lenzi
- Silvano Agosti
- Marco Bellocchio
- Roberto Faenza
- Fausto Brizzi
- Yasuzo Masumura
- Salvatore Mereu
- Gabriele Muccino
- Giuseppe Petitto
- Susanna Nicchiarelli
- Eros Puglielli
- Sergio Sollima
- Roberta Torre
- Paolo Virzì
- Veljko Bulajic
- Margaret Tait

=== Actors ===
- Giorgio Albertazzi
- Cristiano Caccamo
- Maria Pia Calzone
- Claudia Cardinale
- Andrea Checchi
- Carla Del Poggio
- Babak Karimi
- Sophia Loren
- Enrico Lo Verso
- Domenico Modugno
- Giovanni Morassutti
- Francesca Neri
- Rosalba Neri
- Lorenzo Richelmy
- Simona Tabasco
- Alida Valli

=== Cinematographers ===
- Nestor Almendros
- Philo Bregstein
- Pasqualino De Santis
- Vittorio Storaro

=== Costume designers ===
- Daniela Ciancio
- Anina Pinter
