= Shipment (Call of Duty) =

Call of Duty multiplayer map

- Call of Duty location
- "Shipment" as it appears in Call of Duty 4: Modern Warfare
- First appearance: Call of Duty 4: Modern Warfare (2007)
- Last appearance: Call of Duty: Modern Warfare 4 (2026)
- Created by: Geoffrey Smith
- Genre: First-person shooter

In-universe information
- Location: Chernobyl, Ukraine (Call of Duty 4: Modern Warfare); London (Call of Duty: Modern Warfare)

"Shipment" is a multiplayer map in the Call of Duty series of first-person shooter video games published by Activision. Originally set in a shipping yard outside of Chernobyl, the map's design is a small, compact square with numerous shipping containers inside, some of which the player can traverse through. This creates a design consisting of an intersection, and no other elements are present beyond this basic layout. As a result of its small design, the map is notorious for fast paced combat, as well as being a popular place for players to have duels.

The map was first introduced in Call of Duty 4: Modern Warfare (2007), where it was designed by that game's multiplayer design director as a developer test map. During development, the map was accidentally placed into the game's main multiplayer map selection, with its creator since referring to the map as an accident. "Shipment" has subsequently appeared in numerous other games in the Call of Duty series, with some versions making minor layout differences or changing the setting. "Shipment" has been met with a mostly positive response from critics, with praise towards its fast-paced action and simple layout, though others have criticized it for the same reasons. It has been considered one of the most iconic maps in the Call of Duty series, as well as one of its best.

== Design ==
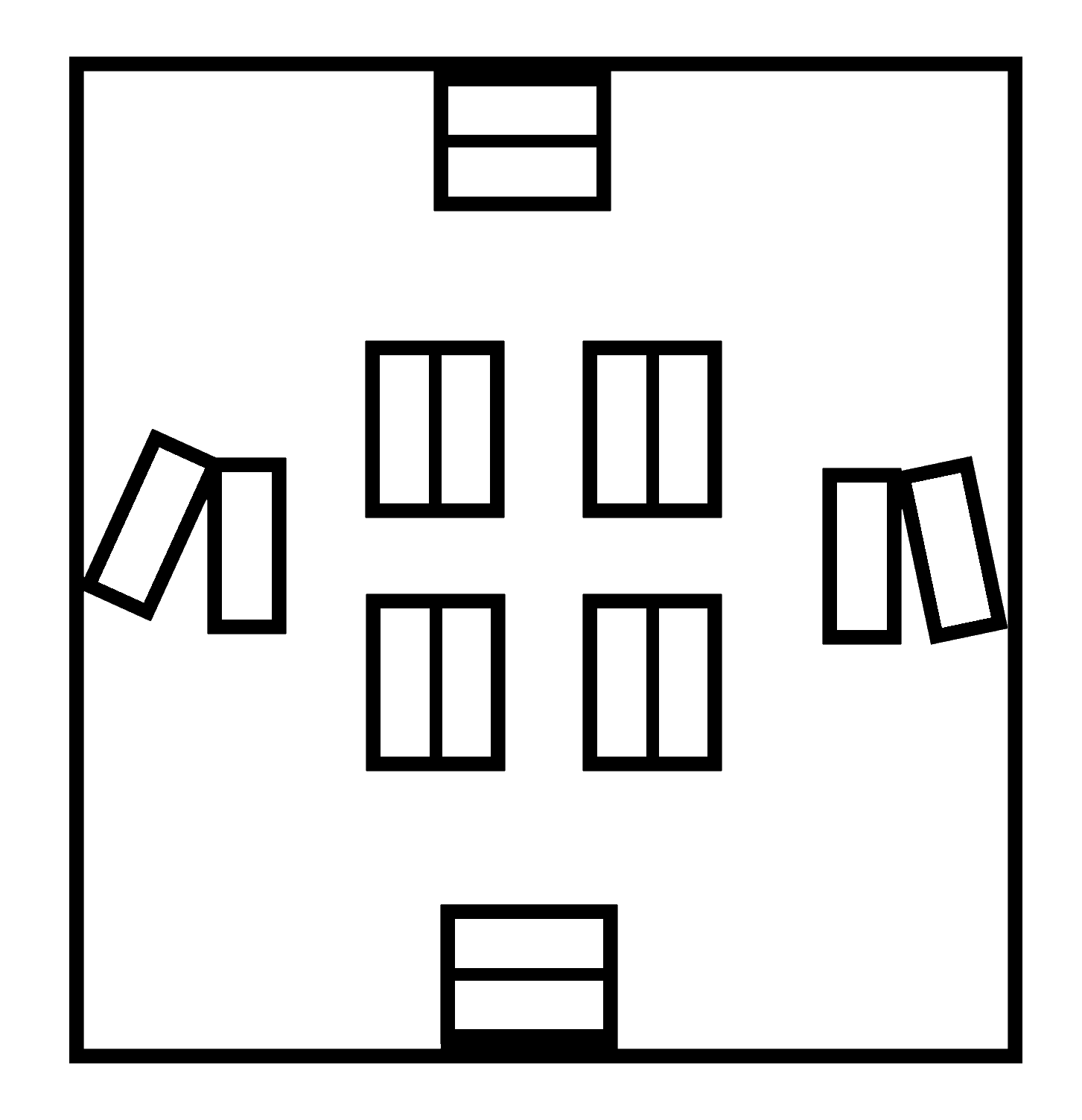
A simplified version of the layout of "Shipment"

"Shipment" is a multiplayer map originating from Call of Duty 4: Modern Warfare (2007), a first-person shooter game developed by Infinity Ward and published by Activision. The map takes place in a shipping yard near Chernobyl, Ukraine. The map's design is extremely small and simple, with the layout being a basic square with four smaller squares made of shipping containers inside it, creating an intersection. Extra angled shipping containers that the player can traverse through and take cover in are leaned up against each wall. No other elements are featured in the map, though later versions of the map do allow for some vertical movement. Players can typically get from one side of the map to the other in a mere ten seconds. Due to its small size and simplicity, fighting on the map is often extremely frantic. With no cover provided to the player beyond the containers, players could be killed immediately upon spawning, an act known as "spawn-killing". The map's frantic pace has made it an ideal location for players to have duels, or "1v1s".

The map was created by Geoffrey Smith, the multiplayer design director of Call of Duty 4: Modern Warfare. Prior to becoming the game's multiplayer designer, Smith created custom maps for Counter Strike 1.6 under the username "compoSITe". "Shipment" has been noted to share numerous similarities with "fy_iceworld", a famous map in the game's community. Due to Smith repurposing his own Counter-Strike maps for Call of Duty titles, it's possible that "Shipment" was directly based on "fy_iceworld". The map was originally designed to be played exclusively in a split-screen setting.

== History ==
"Shipment" first appeared in Call of Duty 4: Modern Warfare as one of sixteen different multiplayer maps included at the game's launch. According to Smith, the map was never intended to be included in the game's official release, and was instead meant to serve as an internal testing map. During development, the map was somehow added to the main multiplayer map selection, a mistake that wasn't noticed until the game had already shipped. Smith has since referred to the map as an accident, as well as the "bane of [his] existence." The map appeared in the game's 2016 remaster, and was intended to be a part of Call of Duty: Modern Warfare 2 (2009), though was scrapped before release.

"Shipment" reappears in Call of Duty: Modern Warfare (2019), the reboot of the original game from 2007. The map was added after the games' launch, with this version taking place in London instead of Chernobyl. This version of the map also made minor design adjustments to prevent "spawn-killing", as well as introducing more verticality. The map has since appeared in the other games in the rebooted Modern Warfare sub-series, Call of Duty: Modern Warfare II (2022) and Call of Duty: Modern Warfare III (2023). The iteration featured in Modern Warfare II moved settings again, this time taking place on a container ship. The map has also been used in April Fools jokes by Infinity Ward, mainly with "Shipment 10v10" in 2020, which later got re-added to the game as a non-April Fools mode. The map is also featured in Call of Duty: Modern Warfare 4 (2026).

Other Call of Duty games have included maps based on "Shipment", though have given it different names, changed the setting, or changed the layout. These versions are "Container" in Call of Duty: Black Ops: Declassified (2012), "Showtime" in Call of Duty: Ghosts (2013), "Shipment 1944" in Call of Duty: WWII (2017), as well as a version in Call of Duty: Vanguard (2021).

== Reception ==
"Shipment" has been frequently referred to as one of the most popular maps in the Call of Duty series, as well as one of its most iconic. Kotaku's Alyssa Mercante wrote that "Shipment" was one of the two most iconic maps in the series, with the other one being "Nuketown" from the Black Ops sub-series. Several outlets have considered "Shipment" to be one of the best maps in the Call of Duty series due to its fast-paced nature.

Writing on the original version of "Shipment", Mercante wrote that the map could "push you over the edge" due to its frantic nature of combat, which was further described as "chaotic." Toby Saunders and Cian Maher of GameRevolution said that "Shipment" was "an experience that is unparalleled in first-person shooters to this day", and one where players typically relied on "luck of the draw" for survival due to spawn-killing; GameRant's Emma Majoros and Jake Fillery echoed similar thoughts. PC World's Brad Chacos praised the map's inclusion in Call of Duty: Modern Warfare II, describing the map as making up for the issues present within the game. Similarly to other writers, he highlighted the maps fast paced combat, which he viewed as allowing him to work around the games weapon upgrade system, which he saw as being flawed.

PC Gamer's Morgan Park referred to the map as the worst map in video game history, commenting that the reasons people loved it were simultaneously its biggest flaws. He wrote that the map "makes zero sense on paper" based on its layout and lack of cover provided to players, describing the map as more of a meme or a tool to level up than a respected map amongst the community. Park also viewed the map as summarizing the points people critical of the Call of Duty series espouse against it, describing it as a "brainless, low-effort meat grinder" when compared to other maps in the series that were also small, such as "Shoothouse" and "Nuketown." Unlike those two, Park viewed "Shipment" as being "mind-numbing." Liam Croft of Push Square, commenting on the addition of the map to Modern Warfare 4, said that Infinity Ward was "killing almost any chance of its new maps for Modern Warfare 4 becoming new fan favourites because everyone is just going to pick Shipment".
