= Lorenzo Foschi =

Italian painter

Lorenzo Foschi (18th-century) was an Italian painter.

He was born in the Marche. He painted a Santa Rosa for the church of San Domenico, Fermo. Lorenzo had four brothers that were also painters: Francesco Foschi (best-known), Carlo, Giacomo, Orazio, and the best-known Francesco Foschi.
