= Year Million =

TV series

- Genre: Docudrama; Science fiction
- Created by: Mark Elijah Rosenberg
- Based on: Year Million: Science at the Far Edge of Knowledge by Damien Broderick
- Starring: Laurence Fishburne; Vinette Robinson; Reece Ritchie; Olive Gray; Dinita Gohil; Joe Corrigall; Siobhan Dillon; Miklós Bányai
- Composer: Timo Elliston
- Country of origin: United States
- Original language: English
- No. of seasons: 1
- No. of episodes: 6

Production
- Executive producers: Justin Wilkes; Tommy Turtle; Dave O’Connor
- Running time: 47 minutes
- Production company: RadicalMedia

Original release
- Network: National Geographic
- Release: May 15 – June 21, 2017

Year Million is a six-part documentary and science fiction television series produced by National Geographic, which premiered on May 15, 2017, on their channel. The series received two Emmy Award nominations, including a Primetime Emmy for its narrator Laurence Fishburne. The series is based on the 2008 book Year Million: Science at the Far Edge of Knowledge by Damien Broderick. The narrative alternates between a story set in the future about a family of three and 2016 interviews that explain the events unfolding in the story. The series was filmed in Budapest.

== Synopsis ==
Investigating the ramifications of a variety of potentially world-changing inventions, the series visits a cast of characters representing a typical American family in several different possible timelines. Ray Kurzweil, Michio Kaku, Peter Diamandis and Brian Greene guide the documentary aspect, discussing possible changes the future might hold based on their research: Artificial Intelligence, Man merging with Machine, the human species becoming an interplanetary entity. Exploring life in both the near and the far future, where artificial intelligence is ubiquitous and advances in science have radically extended our lifespans. The series aims to show that communication, work and education will be revolutionized through virtual telepathy.

== Accolades ==
The series' narrator, Laurence Fishburne, was nominated for a Primetime Emmy Award, with a further Craft Emmy Nomination for Outstanding Lighting Direction and Scenic Design.

== Cast ==
Each episode of the series is broken up into first narrated scenes, then interviews with scientists and futurologists; the docudrama segments fit around the interviews and narration to illustrate how technological changes might impact a regular family.

- Laurence Fishburne as Narrator

=== Interviews ===
- Ray Kurzweil
- Michio Kaku
- Peter Diamandis
- Brian Greene

=== Drama ===
- Vinette Robinson - Eva
- Reece Ritchie - Oscar
- Dinita Gohil - Sajani
- Olive Gray - Jess
- Joe Corrigall - Damon
- Siobhan Dillon - Mother
- Miklós Bányai - Newscaster

== Episodes ==
No.	Title	Directed by	Written by	Original release date
1	"Homo Sapien 2.0"	Mark Elijah Rosenberg	Chris Connolly, Jenny Connell Davis, Jeremy Lubman and Bryan Wizemann	May 15, 2017
Advances in science and engineering are hastening the day when artificial intelligence may become similar to, or perhaps surpass human intelligence. This episode asks how this might affect our evolution.
2	"Never Say Die"	Mark Elijah Rosenberg	Chris Connolly, Jenny Connell Davis, Jeremy Lubman and Bryan Wizemann	May 22, 2017
Recent discoveries have given us greater understanding of human biology and how people can live longer... this episode asks if a time may come when technology transcends beyond treating individual diseases and instead just addresses the aging process itself.
3	"Dude, Where's My Body?"	Mark Elijah Rosenberg	Story by : Mickey Fisher; Teleplay by : Mickey Fisher and Paul Solet	May 31, 2017
Advances in graphics processing and computing generally now mean that humans see the possibilities of working in virtual spaces. This episode asks if there is a potential danger that eventually reality will be overthrown by the virtual worlds people have created for ourselves.
4	"Mind Meld"	Mark Elijah Rosenberg	Chris Connolly, Jenny Connell Davis, Jeremy Lubman and Bryan Wizemann	June 7, 2017
This episode asks if constant connectivity has affected the privacy that people have always taken for granted. In the deep future, will telepathy be technologically possible, will we even be able to communicate with civilizations beyond Earth?
5	"Energy Beyond Earth"	Mark Elijah Rosenberg	Chris Connolly, Jenny Connell Davis, Jeremy Lubman and Bryan Wizemann	June 14, 2017
Overconsumption has led us to a point where the human race will either have to engineer its way around supply and demand problems, or it will have to look to other planets to inhabit. This episode asks if it is possible that alien civilizations have already solved similar problems.
6	"Beyond The Cosmos"	Mark Elijah Rosenberg	Story by : André Bormanis; Teleplay by : André Bormanis and Paul Solet	June 21, 2017
Humans have always been a species that is compelled to explore. This spirit has led them to new shores and recently to the planets of the Solar System. As the number of places remaining to be explored on Earth vanishes, this episode asks how people might have to adapt to explore the further reaches of space.
