= Domenico Distilo =

Italian film director

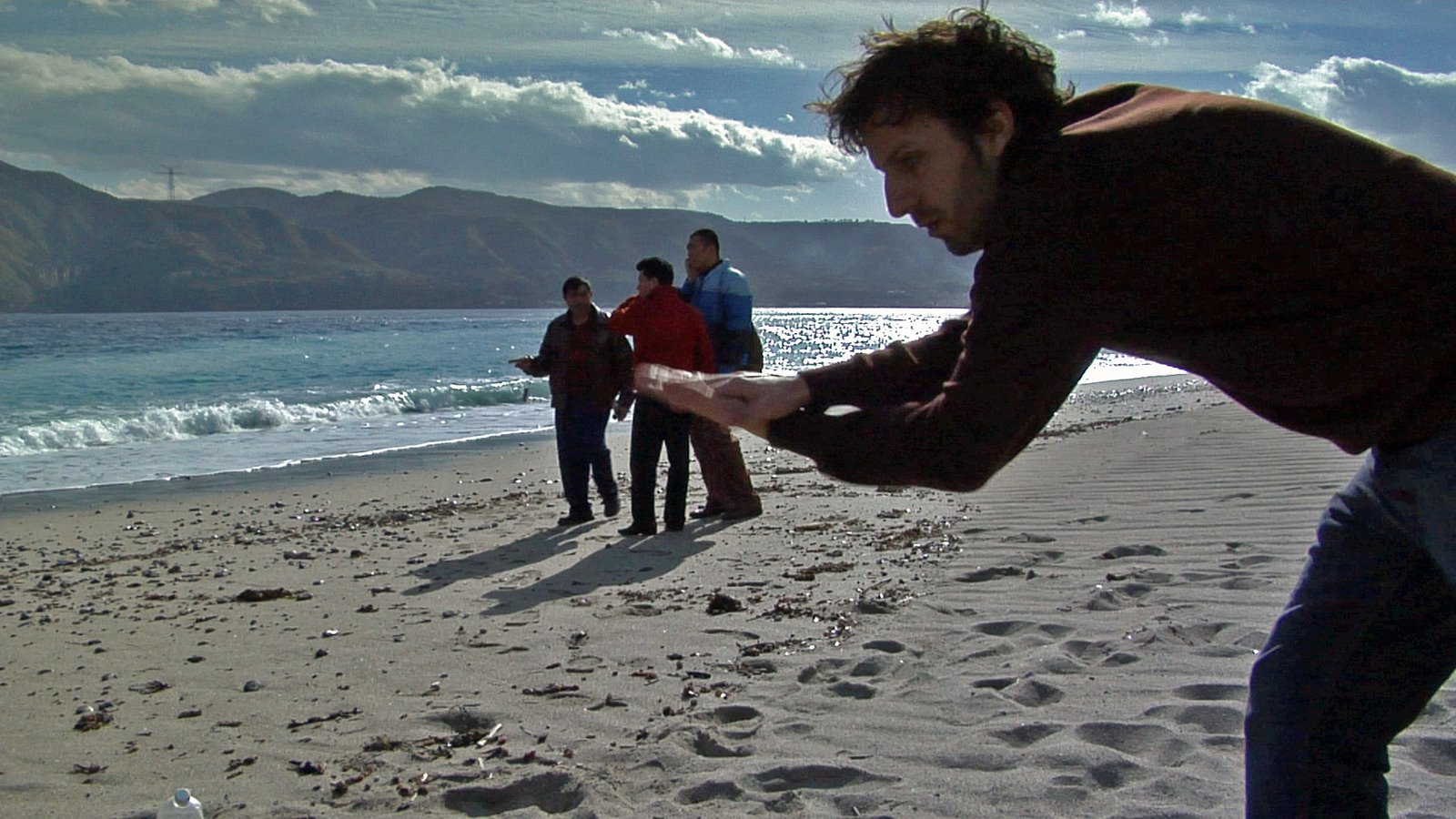
- Domenico Distilo
- Born: 25 December 1978 (age 47); Rome, Lazio, Italy
- Occupation: Filmmaker/Director
- Years active: 2001–present

Domenico Distilo (born 25 December 1978 in Rome, Lazio, Italy) is a filmmaker living and working between Rome, Italy and Berlin, Germany.

He graduated in film direction from the Centro Sperimentale di Cinematografia in Rome with the film Unexpected (Inatteso), a documentary on the demand for political asylum in Italy, which was screened at the Festival dei Popoli in Florence and at the Berlinale, within the section "Forum" in 2006.

In 2008, he won the national prize Premio Solinas for the screenplay of the feature film When elephants fight (Quando gli elefanti combattono), written in collaboration with Filippo Gravino and Guido Iuculano.

In 2009, he joined the production company Sciara, where he works as director and producer.

In 2011, he directed two documentaries for RAI 3, the Italian cultural public channel: Urban extremes - Jerusalem (Estremi urbani, Gerusalemme), on the territorial conflict in Jerusalem and Romany imaginary - Minority artists (Immaginario Rom - Artisti Contro), on Romany art in Hungary.

Distilo's works generally focus on social issues, with a special interest in various forms of contemporary art.

In his movie Deep time (Margini di sottosuolo) (2011), he explored the boundaries between documentary and fiction with a story on archeology and the feelings that bound people to their past.

In 2018 his documentary Manga Do, Igort and the way of the manga won the audience award at the Biografilm Festival in Bologna. The film tells the journey of Igort, one of the most important Italian graphic novel authors, in the founding places of Japanese culture. The film follows a previous reportage, Igort, the secret landscape (2013), which tells the story of Igort's search for the creation of his trilogy on the Soviet Union.

== Prizes and awards ==
- In 2000 his short film Entrevias won the first prize at the Messina Film Festival
- In 2006 Unexpected (Inatteso) won the first prize as best documentary at Alicante Film Festival and received the jury's special mention at the Arcipelago - Festival Internazionale di Cortometraggi e Nuove Immagini of Rome
- In 2008 the screenplay from When elephants fight (Quando gli elefanti combattono) won the first prize at the event Premio Solinas
- In 2011 Distilo won the Premio maestri del documentario at the Assaggi di realtà festival of Messina
- In 2018 Manga Do, Igort and the way of the manga was awarded the Audience award at the Biografilm Festival in Bologna

== Filmography ==
=== Documentaries ===
- A day in Rome (Un giorno a Roma), (2001), produced by Centro Sperimentale di Cinematografia
- Tiburtina tells (Tiburtina racconta), (2005)
- Dialogues for Refugees (Dialoghi di Profughi), (2005)
- Unexpected (Inatteso), (2005), produced by Centro Sperimentale di Cinematografia
- CAM Selinunte, (2008), produced by Sciara
- The Calm and the Storm, (2010)
- Urban Extremes – Jerusalem (Estremi urbani - Gerusalemme), (2011), produced by Sciara
- Romany imaginary - Minority artists (Immaginario Rom - Artisti contro), (2011), produced by Sciara
- Deep time (Margini di Sottosuolo), (2011), produced by Sciara
- Igort, the secret landscape, (2013), produced by Sciara
- Manga Do, Igort and the way of the manga, (2018) produced by Sciara

=== Short films ===
- Entrevias, (2000)
- Bartleby, the scrivener (Bartleby, lo scrivano), (2004), an adaptation from Herman Melville's homonym tale produced by Centro Sperimentale di Cinematografia
- Laura in Lampedusa (Laura a Lampedusa), (2009), produced by Rai 1 for the programme "Vivo per te - 150 anni della Croce Rossa", broadcast on 25 December 2009
- Bettgeflüster (Pillow Talk), (2021), short film comedy, German Leads. Presented at the "late-night-love" section of the PÖFF SHORTS, Tallinn Black Nights Film Festival 2021

=== Projects ===
- The rope over the sea (Dawaz: la fune sul mare), a documentary with Adili Wuxiuer
- When elephants fight (Quando gli elefanti combattono), movie
