= Eight Crazy Nights =

2002 animated film by Seth Kearsley

- Theatrical release poster
- Directed by: Seth Kearsley
- Written by: Brooks Arthur; Allen Covert; Brad Isaacs; Adam Sandler
- Produced by: Adam Sandler; Jack Giarraputo; Allen Covert
- Starring: Adam Sandler; Jackie Titone; Austin Stout; Rob Schneider; Kevin Nealon; Norm Crosby; Jon Lovitz
- Narrated by: Rob Schneider
- Edited by: Amy Budden
- Music by: Ray Ellis; Marc Ellis; Teddy Castellucci
- Production companies: Columbia Pictures; Happy Madison Productions; Meatball Animation
- Distributed by: Sony Pictures Releasing
- Release date: November 27, 2002
- Running time: 76 minutes
- Country: United States
- Language: English
- Budget: $34 million
- Box office: $23.8 million

Eight Crazy Nights (also known as Adam Sandler's Eight Crazy Nights) is a 2002 American adult animated musical comedy film starring, co-written and produced by Adam Sandler. Directed by Seth Kearsley (in his feature length directorial debut), the supporting cast includes Sandler's future wife Jackie Titone, Austin Stout, Rob Schneider, Kevin Nealon, Norm Crosby and Jon Lovitz. Set around Hanukkah, the film centers on Davey Stone, a troubled Jewish alcoholic who is sentenced to community service with the aid of an aging referee in an attempt at rehabilitation.

The title is taken from a line in Sandler's "The Chanukah Song" that compares the gift-giving traditions of Christmas and Hanukkah: "Instead of one day of presents, we get eight crazy nights!" A new version of the song plays over the film's closing credits.

Eight Crazy Nights was released in the United States on November 27, 2002 by Sony Pictures Releasing to a critical and commercial failure, but has gained a cult following. The film was panned by critics, and grossed $23.8 million against its $34 million budget.

== Plot ==
Jewish alcoholic Davey Stone's criminal record has earned him animosity in his hometown of Dukesberry, New Hampshire. On the first night of Hanukkah, Davey is taken to court for his recent criminal activity, which includes dining and dashing, indecent exposure, and destruction of public property. Whitey Duvall, a diminutive, eccentric aging volunteer referee from Davey's former youth basketball league attending the hearing from the courtroom gallery, convinces the judge to let Davey do community service as a referee-in-training for the league as he has seen some past offenders reform after spending time on his league. The judge agrees, but warns that if Davey commits another crime before his tenure at the league concludes, he will be sentenced to a minimum of ten years in prison.

As Davey harasses the players at his first game, Whitey has a seizure and the game is abruptly halted with Davey forfeiting it to the opposing team. Attempting to calm Davey down, Whitey takes him to the local mall, where they encounter Davey's childhood crush Jennifer Friedman, now a divorced single mother who has moved back to Dukesberry and taken a job there, and her preteen son Benjamin. Davey still secretly harbors feelings for Jennifer, but Whitey reminds Davey that he squandered his chance with her years ago.

Whitey's various attempts to encourage Davey are repeatedly met with humiliation and assault. Later, Davey bonds with Benjamin while playing basketball at the community center, but Benjamin's unsportsmanlike behavior, encouraged by Davey, earns him the ire of Jennifer. On their respective rides home, Davey and Jennifer reminisce on their past. Davey returns home to find his trailer being burned down by one of the men whom he defeated in the earlier basketball game and rushes inside to retrieve a Hanukkah card from his late parents. Whitey invites Davey to stay with him and his diabetic twin sister Eleanore; Davey reluctantly accepts. The siblings explain the complex rules of their household, threatening to evict Davey if he does not abide.

Davey gradually starts to improve himself, until Whitey one day recounts Davey's past—en route to one of Davey's basketball games, Davey's parents died in a car accident, which he learned of shortly after winning the game. Davey spent the rest of his childhood in and out of foster facilities and state homes, numbing his pain with alcohol and petty crime during his teenage years and ostracizing himself from Jennifer and his other friends. Enraged after being reminded of his trauma, Davey insults the Duvalls, resulting in a heartbroken Whitey evicting him.

Davey spends the rest of the day binge-drinking. That night, he drunkenly breaks into the closed mall and hallucinates the mascots of various stores coming to life and confronting him about his inability to grieve. He finally opens the card, which contains a heartfelt message asking him not to change who he is, and allows himself to cry over the loss of his parents. When the police arrive to arrest him, Davey fights off the officers and escapes. He boards a bus to New York City, but the bus is forced to stop when a thumbtack in the road punctures the tires. Reminded of the Miracle of Hanukkah, Davey sets out to make amends with Whitey.

Davey finds Whitey at the All-Star Banquet, an annual town celebration in which one member of the community is recognized for positive contributions with the "Dukesberry All-Star Patch", which Whitey has coveted for thirty-five years. After being passed over again, a dejected Whitey resolves to move to Florida and live the remainder of his life in anonymity. Davey reminds the townspeople of the abuse they have subjected Whitey to throughout his life and the selfless contributions Whitey has made to the community in spite of that. Davey leads them to the mall, where Whitey is with Eleanore. The townspeople thank Whitey for his service over the years and the mayor officially grants him the Patch; previous recipients give him theirs as well. As Davey and Jennifer reconcile, Whitey has another seizure, which he proclaims is "the happiest seizure of [his] life."

== Voice cast ==
- Adam Sandler as:
  - Davey Stone, a self-hating and short-tempered alcoholic
    - Josh Uhler portrays the character's younger self
  - Whitey Duvall, a strange and elderly volunteer referee diminutive
  - Eleanore Duvall, Whitey's bespectacled fraternal twin sister
  - The vocal effects of Dukesberry's local deer
- Jackie Titone as Jennifer Friedman, Davey's childhood friend and love interest
  - Alison Krauss provides the character's singing voice, while Ali Hoffman portrays her younger self.
- Austin Stout as Benjamin Friedman, Jennifer's son
  - Jason Houseman provides the character's singing voice
- Rob Schneider as:
  - The film's narrator
  - Mr. Chang, the owner of Dukesberry's local Chinese restaurant
- Kevin Nealon as Mayor Dewey
  - James Barbour provides the character's singing voice
- Carmen Filpi as a homeless man
- Norm Crosby as the judge
- Jon Lovitz as Tom Baltezor

=== Additional voices ===
The rest of the cast are listed under this section in the end credits:

- Tyra Banks as Victoria's Secret gown
- Blake Clark as Radio Shack walkie-talkie
- Peter Dante as Foot Locker referee
- Ellen Albertini Dow as See's Candies box
- Kevin Farley as Panda Express giant panda
- Lari Friedman as The Coffee Bean & Tea Leaf cup
- Tom Kenny as The Sharper Image chair
- Dylan Sprouse and Cole Sprouse as the KB Toys soldiers
- Carl Weathers as GNC bottle
- Jamie Alcroft as Eli Wolstan
- Brooks Arthur as Rabbi Fliegel
- Allen Covert as:
  - A bus driver
  - Mayor Dewey's husband
  - An elderly woman
  - Lainie Kazan provides the latter's singing voice
- Judith Sandler as Davey's unnamed mother
  - Ann Wilson provides the character's singing voice
- Stan Sandler as Davey's unnamed father
  - Richard Page provides the character's singing voice
- Archie Hahn as a television announcer

== Production ==
Eight Crazy Nights was animated primarily by Meatball Animation. Prior to production, during a transitional period from the focus of 2D to 3D animation in Hollywood, several traditional animation studios closed down, with many animators who were laid off being hired by Meatball; allegedly, employees at Meatball were largely those formerly employed at Fox Animation Studios and Warner Bros. Feature Animation. Several studios, including Anvil Studios, Bardel Entertainment, Goldenbell Animation, Marina Motion Animation, Spaff Animation, Tama Production, Time Lapse Pictures, Y. R. Studio and Yowza! Animation, also did animation work. It was the only animated film that Adam Sandler worked on until Hotel Transylvania in 2012, and remains the only traditionally-animated film with his involvement.

Kearsley revealed in an email to Doug Walker that certain elements of the film that were notorious, specifically the feces-eating deer scene and even Whitey's voice (which was originally more high-pitched and annoying), were intended to be cut, but were kept due to "focus groups" who had seen the film (who lowered Whitey's voice), as well as the fact that the product placements were used without permission.

== Music ==
The soundtrack was released on November 27, 2002, by Columbia/Sony Music Soundtrax. The soundtrack contains every song in the film, including the new installment of "The Chanukah Song" and a deleted song, called "At the Mall", sung by Whitey as he strolls through the mall in an alternate opening, included on the DVD release. The soundtrack was pressed onto vinyl in 2021 for the Vinyl Me, Please record club.

No.	Title	Performer(s)	Length
1.	"Davey's Song"	Sandler
2.	"At the Mall"	Sandler & Kevin Grady
3.	"Patch Song"	Sandler
4.	"Long Ago"	Sandler, Alison Krauss & Eight Crazy Nights Cast
5.	"Technical Foul"	Sandler	3:39
6.	"Intervention Song (Let it Out Davey)"	Sandler & Eight Crazy Nights Cast	2:17
7.	"Bum Biddy"	Sandler & Eight Crazy Nights Cast
8.	"The Chanukah Song, Part 3"	Sandler

== Release ==
Eight Crazy Nights came in at fifth place on its opening weekend among U.S. box office, making $14 million since its Wednesday launch. It grossed a total of $23.6 million in North America and negligible foreign box office receipts, for a total of $23.8 million worldwide.

=== Critical reception ===
Film critics panned Eight Crazy Nights. On the review aggregator website Rotten Tomatoes, 13% of 109 critics' reviews are positive, with an average rating of 3.7/10. The website's consensus reads: "Sandler returns to his roots in this nauseating concoction filled with potty humor and product placements." Metacritic, which uses a weighted average, assigned the film a score of 23 out of 100, based on 27 critics, indicating "generally unfavorable" reviews. Audiences polled by CinemaScore gave the film an average grade of "B" on an A+ to F scale.

Roger Ebert gave the film two out of four possible stars and criticized the film's dour tone, saying that "The holidays aren't very cheerful in Sandlerville." Matthew Rozsa of Salon called it the best known Hanukkah film despite its poor quality. William Thomas of Empire gave the film a one out of five stars, saying, "File under 'What the hell were they thinking?'. With this, and Mr. Deeds, Sandler's pulled off quite the combo. Avoid like the plague."

Sandler won a 2003 Kids' Choice Award for "Favorite Voice from an Animated Movie". He was also nominated twice for the 2002 Golden Raspberry Award for Worst Actor for his performances in both Eight Crazy Nights and Mr. Deeds.

=== Home media ===
Eight Crazy Nights was released on VHS and single and two-disc edition DVD on November 4, 2003, by Columbia TriStar Home Entertainment. The two-disc "special edition" features deleted scenes, several audio commentaries, and Sandler's short film A Day with the Meatball, among other bonus features. A Blu-ray was issued on December 13, 2016.

== See also ==
- List of American films of 2002
- List of animated feature films of 2002
