= Happy Madison Productions =

Media production company

Happy Madison Productions, Inc.
- Logo used since 2005
- Type: Private
- Industry: Film production; Television production
- Founded: December 10, 1999; 26 years ago
- Founder: Adam Sandler
- Headquarters: Los Angeles, California, U.S.; Manchester, New Hampshire, U.S. (parent company)
- Key people: Adam Sandler (CEO); Allen Covert; Tim Herlihy; Scott Sandler; Barry Bernardi; Steve Koren
- Parent: Happy Madison, Inc.
- Divisions: Madison 23 Productions; Scary Madison Productions; Meatball Animation

Happy Madison Productions, Inc. is an American independent film and television production company founded in 1999 by Adam Sandler, which is best known for its comedy films. The company is named after the films Happy Gilmore and Billy Madison, which both star Sandler himself, produced by Robert Simonds, written by Sandler and Tim Herlihy, and distributed by Universal Pictures.

In addition to various Sandler-produced films, the company has also released films produced by others, such as Steven Brill, Dennis Dugan, Frank Coraci, Fred Wolf, Tom Brady, Peter Segal, Nicholaus Goossen, and Tyler Spindel.

The 1998 films The Waterboy and The Wedding Singer helped jump start Sandler's movie career and production company. He produced The Waterboy and co-wrote the script with Tim Herlihy. The film was extremely profitable, earning over $160 million in the United States alone and made Sandler a successful actor with The Waterboy becoming his second $100 million film in a year, along with The Wedding Singer.

The company's production offices were formerly located in the Judy Garland Building on the Sony Pictures Studios lot in Culver City, but the company left after completion of Sandler's final contracted film for the studio, Pixels. Happy Madison, Inc., the parent company of Happy Madison Productions, is run by Adam Sandler's brother Scott, and is located in Manchester, New Hampshire.

In 2002, the company expanded its operations onto television with a pilot commitment at The WB. After fifteen years, head Doug Robinson left the company to start his own company with a deal at Sony Pictures Television.

The company also had a short-lived subsidiary called Madison 23 Productions, which was aimed at the drama genre. It only produced two films: Reign Over Me and Funny People, both of which starred Sandler. Another subsidiary was Scary Madison Productions, which was aimed at the horror genre and only produced the film The Shortcut.

== Filmography ==
=== Film ===
Year	Title	Director	Writer(s)		Producer(s)	Budget	Gross (worldwide)	Notes	Ref.
Year	Title	Director	Story by	Screenplay by	Producer(s)	Budget	Gross (worldwide)	Notes	Ref.
1999	Deuce Bigalow: Male Gigolo	Mike Mitchell	Harris Goldberg; Rob Schneider		Barry Bernardi; Sid Ganis	$20 million	$120.9 million	with Out of the Blue... Entertainment and Touchstone Pictures; distributed by Buena Vista Pictures Distribution	
2000	Little Nicky	Steven Brill	Tim Herlihy; Adam Sandler; Steven Brill		Robert Simonds; Jack Giarraputo	$85 million	$58.3 million	with The Robert Simonds Company; distributed by New Line Cinema	
2001	Joe Dirt	Dennie Gordon	David Spade; Fred Wolf		Robert Simonds	$17.7 million	$31 million	with Robert Simonds Productions and Columbia Pictures; distributed by Sony Pictures Releasing	
2001	The Animal	Luke Greenfield	Tom Brady	Tom Brady; Rob Schneider	Barry Bernardi; Carr D'Angelo; Todd Garner	$47 million	$84.8 million	with Revolution Studios and Columbia Pictures; distributed by Sony Pictures Releasing	
2002	Mr. Deeds	Steven Brill	Tim Herlihy		Sid Ganis; Jack Giarraputo	$50 million	$192.3 million	with Out of the Blue... Entertainment, New Line Cinema, and Columbia Pictures; distributed by Sony Pictures Releasing	
2002	The Master of Disguise	Perry Andelin Blake	Dana Carvey; Harris Goldberg		Sid Ganis; Alex Siskin; Barry Bernardi; Todd Garner	$16 million	$43.4 million	with Revolution Studios, Out of the Blue Entertainment and Columbia Pictures; distributed by Sony Pictures Releasing	
2002	Eight Crazy Nights	Seth Kearsley	Brooks Arthur; Allen Covert; Brad Isaacs; Adam Sandler		Adam Sandler; Jack Giarraputo; Allen Covert	$34 million	$23.8 million	with Columbia Pictures; distributed by Sony Pictures Releasing	
2002	The Hot Chick	Tom Brady	Tom Brady; Rob Schneider		John Schneider; Carr D'Angelo	$34 million	$54.6 million	with Touchstone Pictures; distributed by Buena Vista Pictures Distribution	
2003	Anger Management	Peter Segal	David S. Dorfman		Jack Giarraputo; Barry Bernardi	$75 million	$236.7 million	with Revolution Studios and Columbia Pictures; distributed by Sony Pictures Releasing	
2003	Dickie Roberts: Former Child Star	Sam Weisman	Fred Wolf; David Spade		Adam Sandler; Jack Giarraputo	$17 million	$23.8 million	distributed by Paramount Pictures	
2004	50 First Dates	Peter Segal	George Wing		Jack Giarraputo; Steve Golin; Nancy Juvonen	$80 million	$265.5 million	with Flower Films, Anonymous Content, and Columbia Pictures; distributed by Sony Pictures Releasing	
2005	The Longest Yard	Peter Segal	Sheldon Turner		Jack Giarraputo	$90 million	$194.5 million	with Callahan Filmworks, MTV Films, Paramount Pictures, and Columbia Pictures; distributed in the USA and Canada by Paramount Pictures and internationally by Sony Pictures Releasing (via Sony Pictures Releasing International)	
2005	Deuce Bigalow: European Gigolo	Mike Bigelow	Rob Schneider	Rob Schneider; David Garrett; Jason Ward	Jack Giarraputo; Adam Sandler; John Schneider	$22 million	$45.1 million	with Out of the Blue... Entertainment and Columbia Pictures; distributed by Sony Pictures Releasing	
2006	Grandma's Boy	Nicholaus Goossen	Barry Wernick; Allen Covert; Nick Swardson		Adam Sandler; Allen Covert	$5 million	$6.6 million	with Level 1 Entertainment; distributed in the USA and Canada by 20th Century Fox and internationally by Summit Entertainment	
2006	The Benchwarmers	Dennis Dugan	Allen Covert; Nick Swardson		Adam Sandler; Jack Giarraputo	$33 million	$65 million	with Revolution Studios and Columbia Pictures; distributed by Sony Pictures Releasing	
2006	Click	Frank Coraci	Steve Koren; Mark O'Keefe		Adam Sandler; Jack Giarraputo; Neal H. Moritz; Steve Koren; Mark O'Keefe	$85 million	$268.7 million	with Original Film, Revolution Studios, and Columbia Pictures; distributed by Sony Pictures Releasing	
2007	Reign Over Me	Mike Binder			Jack Binder; Michael Rotenberg	$20 million	$22.2 million	with Sunlight Productions, Relativity Media, and Columbia Pictures; distributed by Sony Pictures Releasing	
2007	I Now Pronounce You Chuck & Larry	Dennis Dugan	Barry Fanaro; Alexander Payne; Jim Taylor		Adam Sandler; Jack Giarraputo; Tom Shadyac; Michael Bostick	$85 million	$190.1 million	with Shady Acres Entertainment and Relativity Media; distributed by Universal Pictures	
2008	Strange Wilderness	Fred Wolf	Peter Gaulke; Fred Wolf		Peter Gaulke	$20 million	$6.9 million	with Level 1 Entertainment; distributed by Paramount Pictures	
2008	You Don't Mess with the Zohan	Dennis Dugan	Adam Sandler; Robert Smigel; Judd Apatow		Adam Sandler; Jack Giarraputo	$90 million	$217.3 million	with Smigel/Dugan Productions, Relativity Media, and Columbia Pictures; distributed by Sony Pictures Releasing	
2008	The House Bunny	Fred Wolf	Karen McCullah; Kirsten Smith		Adam Sandler; Jack Giarraputo; Allen Covert; Heather Parry; Anna Faris	$25 million	$70.4 million	with Alta Loma Entertainment, Relativity Media, and Columbia Pictures; distributed by Sony Pictures Releasing	
2008	Bedtime Stories	Adam Shankman	Matt Lopez	Matt Lopez; Tim Herlihy	Andrew Gunn; Adam Sandler; Jack Giarraputo	$80 million	$224.9 million	with Gunn Films, Conman & Izzy Productions, Offspring Entertainment, and Walt Disney Pictures; distributed by Walt Disney Studios Motion Pictures	
2009	Paul Blart: Mall Cop	Steve Carr	Kevin James; Nick Bakay		Adam Sandler; Jack Giarraputo; Kevin James; Todd Garner; Barry Bernardi	$26 million	$186.3 million	with Relativity Media and Columbia Pictures; distributed by Sony Pictures Releasing	
2009	Funny People	Judd Apatow			Judd Apatow; Clayton Townsend; Barry Mendel	$75 million	$71.6 million	with Apatow Productions, Relativity Media, Universal Pictures, and Columbia Pictures; distributed by Universal Pictures	
2009	The Shortcut	Nicholaus Goossen	Dan Hannon; Scott Sandler		Scott Einbinder; Scott Sandler; Ingo Vollkammer; Brian Witten	$1 million	—N/a	as Scary Madison Productions; with Leomax; distributed by Leomax and Mind's Eye Entertainment	
2010	Grown Ups	Dennis Dugan	Adam Sandler; Fred Wolf		Adam Sandler; Jack Giarraputo	$80 million	$291.4 million	with Relativity Media and Columbia Pictures; distributed by Sony Pictures Releasing	
2011	Just Go with It	Dennis Dugan	Allan Loeb; Timothy Dowling		Adam Sandler; Jack Giarraputo; Heather Parry	$80 million	$253.2 million	with Columbia Pictures; distributed by Sony Pictures Releasing	
2011	Zookeeper	Frank Coraci	Jay Scherick; David Ronn	Nick Bakay; Rock Reuben; Kevin James; Jay Scherick; David Ronn	Todd Garner; Kevin James; Adam Sandler; Jack Giarraputo; Walt Becker	$80 million	$172.8 million	with Broken Road Productions, Hey Eddie Productions, Metro-Goldwyn-Mayer, and Columbia Pictures; distributed by Sony Pictures Releasing	
2011	Bucky Larson: Born to Be a Star	Tom Brady	Adam Sandler; Allen Covert; Nick Swardson		Adam Sandler; Jack Giarraputo; Allen Covert; Nick Swardson; David S. Dorfman	$10 million	$2.5 million	with Miles Deep Productions and Columbia Pictures; distributed by Sony Pictures Releasing	
2011	Jack and Jill	Dennis Dugan	Ben Zook	Steve Koren; Adam Sandler	Todd Garner; Adam Sandler; Jack Giarraputo	$80 million	$179.6 million	with Broken Road Productions and Columbia Pictures; distributed by Sony Pictures Releasing	
2012	That's My Boy	Sean Anders	David Caspe		Adam Sandler; Jack Giarraputo; Heather Parry; Allen Covert	$70 million	$57.7 million	with Relativity Media and Columbia Pictures; distributed by Sony Pictures Releasing	
2012	Here Comes the Boom	Frank Coraci	Allan Loeb; Kevin James		Todd Garner; Kevin James	$42 million	$73.1 million	with Broken Road Productions, Hey Eddie Productions, and Columbia Pictures; distributed by Sony Pictures Releasing	
2013	Grown Ups 2	Dennis Dugan	Fred Wolf; Adam Sandler; Tim Herlihy		Adam Sandler; Jack Giarraputo	$80 million	$277.4 million	with Columbia Pictures; distributed by Sony Pictures Releasing	
2014	Blended	Frank Coraci	Clare Sera; Ivan Menchell		Adam Sandler; Jack Giarraputo; Mike Karz	$40 million	$136 million	with Gulfstream Pictures and RatPac-Dune Entertainment; distributed by Warner Bros. Pictures	
2015	Paul Blart: Mall Cop 2	Andy Fickman	Nick Bakay; Kevin James		Todd Garner; Kevin James; Adam Sandler; Jack Giarraputo	$30 million	$127.6 million	with Broken Road Productions, Hey Eddie Productions, LStar Capital, and Columbia Pictures; distributed by Sony Pictures Releasing	
2015	Joe Dirt 2: Beautiful Loser	Fred Wolf	David Spade; Fred Wolf		Adam Sandler; David Spade; Fred Wolf; Amy S. Kim; Jaimie Burke; Brian Tanke	$3.7 million	—N/a	distributed by Crackle (through Sony Pictures Releasing)	
2015	Pixels	Chris Columbus	Tim Herlihy	Tim Herlihy; Timothy Dowling	Adam Sandler; Chris Columbus; Mark Radcliffe; Allen Covert	$120 million	$245.1 million	with 1492 Pictures, LStar Capital, China Film Group, Film Croppers Entertainment, and Columbia Pictures; distributed by Sony Pictures Releasing	
2015	The Ridiculous 6	Frank Coraci	Tim Herlihy; Adam Sandler		Adam Sandler; Allen Covert; Ted Sarandos	$60 million	—N/a	distributed by Netflix	
2016	The Do-Over	Steven Brill	Kevin Barnett; Chris Pappas		Adam Sandler; Allen Covert; Kevin Grady; Ted Sarandos	$40 million	—N/a	distributed by Netflix	
2017	Sandy Wexler	Steven Brill	Dan Bulla; Paul Sado; Adam Sandler		Adam Sandler; Allen Covert; Ted Sarandos	$24.3 million	—N/a	distributed by Netflix	
2018	The Week Of	Robert Smigel	Robert Smigel; Adam Sandler		Adam Sandler; Allen Covert	—N/a	—N/a	distributed by Netflix	
2018	Father of the Year	Tyler Spindel	Brandon Cournoyer; Tyler Spindel		Allen Covert	—N/a	—N/a	distributed by Netflix	
2019	Murder Mystery	Kyle Newacheck	James Vanderbilt		Adam Sandler; Allen Covert; Tripp Vinson; James D. Stern; James Vanderbilt; A.J. Dix	—N/a	—N/a	with Vinson Films, Endgame Entertainment, Mythology Entertainment, Denver and Delilah Productions, and Tower Hill Entertainment; distributed by Netflix	
2020	The Wrong Missy	Tyler Spindel	Chris Pappas; Kevin Barnett		Kevin Grady; Allen Covert; Judit Maull	—N/a	—N/a	distributed by Netflix	
2020	Hubie Halloween	Steven Brill	Tim Herlihy; Adam Sandler		Adam Sandler; Kevin Grady; Allen Covert	$14 million	—N/a	distributed by Netflix	
2022	Home Team	Charles Kinnane; Daniel Kinnane	Chris Titone; Keith Blum		Adam Sandler; Kevin Grady; Allen Covert; Kevin James; Jeff Lowell; Jeff Sussman	—N/a	—N/a	with Hey Eddie Productions; distributed by Netflix	
2022	Hustle	Jeremiah Zagar	Taylor Materne; Will Fetters		LeBron James; Maverick Carter; Joe Roth; Joseph Vecsey; Jeff Kirschenbaum; Zack Roth; Adam Sandler; Allen Covert	$21 million	—N/a	with Roth/Kirschenbaum Films and SpringHill Company; distributed by Netflix	
2023	Murder Mystery 2	Jeremy Garelick	James Vanderbilt		Adam Sandler; Allen Covert; Tripp Vinson; Jennifer Aniston; James Vanderbilt; James D. Stern	—N/a	—N/a	with Echo Films, Mythology Entertainment, Vinson Films, and Endgame Entertainment; distributed by Netflix	
2023	The Out-Laws	Tyler Spindel	Evan Turner; Ben Zazove		Allen Covert; Adam DeVine; Adam Sandler	$47 million	—N/a	distributed by Netflix	
2023	You Are So Not Invited to My Bat Mitzvah	Sammi Cohen	Alison Peck		Adam Sandler; Tim Herlihy; Leslie Morgenstein; Elysa Koplovitz Dutton	—N/a	—N/a	with Alloy Entertainment; distributed by Netflix	
2023	Leo	Robert Smigel; Robert Marianetti; David Wachtenheim	Robert Smigel; Adam Sandler; Paul Sado		Adam Sandler; Mireille Soria	—N/a	—N/a	with Netflix Animation Studios; distributed by Netflix	
2025	Kinda Pregnant	Tyler Spindel	Julie Paiva	Julie Paiva; Amy Schumer	Adam Sandler; Tim Herlihy; Amy Schumer; Molly Sims; Alex Saks; Kevin Grady; Eli Thomas; Judit Maull	—N/a	—N/a	with Saks Picture Company and Something Happy Productions; distributed by Netflix	
2025	Happy Gilmore 2	Kyle Newacheck	Tim Herlihy; Adam Sandler		Adam Sandler; Tim Herlihy; Jack Giarraputo; Robert Simonds	$152.5 million	—N/a	with Pro Shop Studios; distributed by Netflix	
2026	Roommates	Chandler Levack	Jimmy Fowlie; Ceara O'Sullivan		Adam Sandler; Tim Herlihy; Brian Kavanaugh-Jones	$30 million	—N/a	with Range Media Partners; distributed by Netflix	
2026	Don't Say Good Luck	Julia Hart	Laura Hankin; Julia Hart; Jordan Horowitz		Adam Sandler; Julia Hart; Jordan Horowitz; Brian Kavanaugh-Jones	—N/a	—N/a	with Original Headquarters; distributed by Netflix	
TBA	Dad Camp	TBA				—N/a	—N/a	with 21 Laps Entertainment; distributed by Netflix	
TBA	Grown Ups 3	Kyle Newacheck	Adam Sandler; Tim Herlihy		Adam Sandler; Jackie Sandler; Jack Giarraputo; Tim Herlihy	—N/a	—N/a	with Sony Pictures; distributed by Netflix	

=== Stand-up specials ===
Year	Title	Director	Notes	Ref.
2018	Adam Sandler: 100% Fresh	Steven Brill	co-production with Netflix	—N/a
2024	Adam Sandler: Love You	Josh Safdie	co-production with Irwin Entertainment and Netflix	

=== Television ===
Year	Title	Network	Notes	Ref.
2007–2013	Rules of Engagement	CBS	with Game Six Productions, CBS Television Studios, and Sony Pictures Television	
2008	The Gong Show with Dave Attell	Comedy Central	with GOLDer Productions and Sony Pictures Television	
2010–2011	Nick Swardson's Pretend Time	Comedy Central	with Culver Entertainment	
2011–2012	Breaking In	Fox	with Adam F. Goldberg Productions and Sony Pictures Television	
2013–2023	The Goldbergs	ABC	co-production with Adam F. Goldberg Productions (seasons 1–8), Doug Robinson Productions (seasons 5–10), Swinging Cricket Productions (season 9), Script L. Shannon, Inc. (season 9), This Episode is Entirely a Work of Fiction, LLC (season 10), and Sony Pictures Television	
2017	Imaginary Mary	ABC	co-production with Adam F. Goldberg Productions, ABC Studios, and Sony Pictures Television	
2019–2020	Schooled	ABC	co-production with Adam F. Goldberg Productions, Marc Firek Productions, Doug Robinson Productions, ABC Studios, and Sony Pictures Television	

== Critical reception ==
Happy Madison's films have, for the most part, received overwhelmingly negative reviews, with most of the criticism targeted towards the crude humor, excessive product placements, celebrity cameos, and sentimental endings that contradict the mostly mean-spirited tones of the films. Some drama films (Reign Over Me, Funny People, Hustle and You Are So Not Invited to My Bat Mitzvah) received mixed-to-positive reviews from critics, with Sandler's performances garnering critical praise. The company has put out four films considered to be some of the worst ever made, while two other films have received a 0% score from Rotten Tomatoes.

Year	Film	Rotten Tomatoes	Metacritic
1999	Deuce Bigalow: Male Gigolo	23%	30
2000	Little Nicky	22%	38
2001	Joe Dirt	11%	20
2001	The Animal	30%	43
2002	Mr. Deeds	22%	24
2002	The Master of Disguise	1%	12
2002	Eight Crazy Nights	13%	23
2002	The Hot Chick	22%	29
2003	Anger Management	42%	52
2003	Dickie Roberts: Former Child Star	22%	36
2004	50 First Dates	45%	48
2005	The Longest Yard	31%	48
2005	Deuce Bigalow: European Gigolo	9%	23
2006	Grandma's Boy	16%	33
2006	The Benchwarmers	13%	25
2006	Click	34%	45
2007	Reign Over Me	64%	61
2007	I Now Pronounce You Chuck & Larry	15%	37
2008	Strange Wilderness	2%	12
2008	You Don't Mess with the Zohan	38%	54
2008	The House Bunny	43%	55
2008	Bedtime Stories	27%	33
2009	Paul Blart: Mall Cop	34%	39
2009	Funny People	69%	60
2009	The Shortcut	N/A	N/A
2010	Grown Ups	10%	30
2011	Just Go with It	19%	33
2011	Zookeeper	13%	30
2011	Bucky Larson: Born to Be a Star	3%	9
2011	Jack and Jill	3%	23
2012	That's My Boy	20%	31
2012	Here Comes the Boom	40%	40
2013	Grown Ups 2	7%	19
2014	Blended	15%	31
2015	Paul Blart: Mall Cop 2	5%	14
2015	Joe Dirt 2: Beautiful Loser	10%	N/A
2015	Pixels	17%	27
2015	The Ridiculous 6	0%	18
2016	The Do-Over	10%	22
2017	Sandy Wexler	27%	39
2018	The Week Of	27%	41
2018	Father of the Year	0%	N/A
2018	Adam Sandler: 100% Fresh	90%	N/A
2019	Murder Mystery	45%	38
2020	The Wrong Missy	31%	35
2020	Hubie Halloween	52%	53
2022	Home Team	22%	23
2022	Hustle	94%	68
2023	Murder Mystery 2	45%	44
2023	The Out-Laws	21%	36
2023	You Are So Not Invited to My Bat Mitzvah	91%	71
2023	Leo	84%	65
2025	Kinda Pregnant	29%	38
2025	Happy Gilmore 2	61%	52
2026	Roommates	65%	57
2026	Don't Say Good Luck	93%	73
