= Jack and Jill (2011 film) =

2011 film by Dennis Dugan

- Theatrical release poster
- Directed by: Dennis Dugan
- Screenplay by: Steve Koren; Adam Sandler
- Story by: Ben Zook
- Produced by: Todd Garner; Adam Sandler; Jack Giarraputo
- Starring: Adam Sandler; Katie Holmes; Al Pacino
- Cinematography: Dean Cundey
- Edited by: Tom Costain
- Music by: Rupert Gregson-Williams; Waddy Wachtel
- Production companies: Columbia Pictures; Happy Madison Productions; Broken Road Productions
- Distributed by: Sony Pictures Releasing
- Release date: November 11, 2011
- Running time: 91 minutes
- Country: United States
- Language: English
- Budget: $79 million
- Box office: $149 million

Jack and Jill is a 2011 American comedy film co-written by and starring Adam Sandler in a dual role as the titular twin siblings. Directed by Dennis Dugan, the film also stars Katie Holmes and Al Pacino. It tells the story of an advertising executive who dreads the Thanksgiving visit of his unemployed twin sister, who overstays into Hanukkah at a time when he is instructed to procure Al Pacino's appearance in an upcoming Dunkin' Donuts commercial.

Jack and Jill was released on November 11, 2011, by Sony Pictures Releasing. The film was panned by critics, who criticized the humor, premise, and use of product placement, although Pacino's performance received some praise. Many have since considered the film to be one of the worst films ever made. At the 32nd Golden Raspberry Awards, the film was nominated for a record of 12 Razzies in all ten categories. It became the first film to sweep the Razzies, winning in each category, including Worst Picture, Worst Director, Worst Actor, Worst Actress and Worst Screenplay. The film's ten wins was also a record for most Razzies won by any film.

== Plot ==
Growing up in The Bronx, Jill Sadelstein repeatedly attempts unsuccessfully to capture the attention of her gifted twin brother Jack by injuring him or repelling others from him. As an adult, Jack is a successful advertising executive, residing in Los Angeles with his wife Erin, their biological daughter Sofia, and their adoptive son originally from India, Gary, who compulsively tapes various objects to his body. Conversely, Jill is unemployed and lives alone in their childhood home, which she inherited following their mother's death the previous year.

Visiting Jack for Thanksgiving, Jill announces her intentions to depart at the end of Hanukkah, having an open-ended plane ticket, much to his consternation. At dinner, her obnoxious behavior embarrasses a homeless guest, Otto, as well as Erin's parents, Carter and Bitsy Simmons. Jack frustratedly snaps at her, and she flees into the woods with her pet cockatoo Poopsie. Erin demands that Jack should apologize to her, which he reluctantly does.

Jill completes a checklist of activities that she has planned for her visit. Among the activities listed is appearing as a contestant on The Price Is Right; she receives various consolation prizes after unintentionally incapacitating herself while spinning the Big Wheel in the Showcase Showdown. While out horseback riding, she proves to be too massive for a pony that collapses under her weight immediately after she mounts it. When she answers her ringing cellphone during a movie, Jack reprimands her, and she tearfully departs.

Deciding that Jill needs a romantic partner, Jack, aided by Gary and Sofia, encourages her to try online dating. She is initially unsuccessful until Jack edits her profile on her behalf and uploads it to Craigslist, which proceeds to garner over 100 responses. A person nicknamed "Funbucket" meets her at a high-end restaurant, but a few minutes into their evening, he retreats into the men's restroom and hides there until she leaves. The staff of Jack's company, Sunny & Sadelstein, throw him a birthday party. Jill attends, but disgraces herself along with Jack and his colleagues, resulting in her ejection.

Meanwhile, Jack tries to cast Al Pacino in a Dunkin' Donuts commercial for their newest menu item, the Dunkaccino. At a Lakers game, Pacino ignores Jack but becomes infatuated with Jill. He gives her his phone number and invites her to his home, where she accidentally destroys his Oscar statuette. Uninterested in him, she promptly departs. Jack's Mexican gardener Felipe, also smitten with her, introduces her to his family at their annual fiesta. She immediately connects with everyone, including his children, as he has been a widower since the death of his wife 4 years earlier; however, after trying Mexican food for the first time, she suffers a severe case of diarrhea.

Pacino agrees to work on the Dunkaccino advertisement on the condition that he has another date with Jill, so Jack invites her to accompany him and his family on a cruise. She insists on bringing Poopsie, despite the cruise line's strict anti-pet policy. At sea, Jill and Poopsie irritate everybody on board. When Jill repeatedly rebuffs Pacino, Jack disguises himself as her and flirts with him on her behalf. Suspecting that her invitation was only to convince Pacino to do the advertisement, she phones Jack and hears Pacino in the background. Dejectedly arriving home in the Bronx on New Year's Eve, Jill discovers that the bank has foreclosed on her home because she discarded numerous bills that she mistook for junk mail.

Now homeless, Jill encounters a group of former schoolmates, led by class bully Monica, at a restaurant. Jack arrives with his family, and the siblings reconcile via their invented secret language. Monica attacks Erin, but Jill shields her from Monica's wrath. Afterwards, arriving at Jill's house, the group encounters Felipe, who has followed Jill and decorated the house. Pacino arrives dressed as Don Quixote, his character in a Broadway production of Man of La Mancha, and reminds Jill that although he still cares about her, other men deserve her more than he does. She turns to Felipe, who confesses that he loves her, and they start a relationship.

Ultimately, Pacino disapproves of Sunny and Sadelstein's commercial, which features him rapping, and instructs Jack to destroy all iterations of it.

== Cast ==
- Adam Sandler as:
  - Jack Sadelstein, a gifted advertisement executive
  - Jill Sadelstein, the unemployed fraternal twin sister of Jack
- Katie Holmes as Erin Sadelstein (née Simmons), Jack's wife and Jill's sister-in-law
- Al Pacino as himself, an actor who Jack is instructed to get for a Dunkin' Donuts commercial
- Eugenio Derbez as:
  - Felipe, Jack's gardener and Jill's love interest
  - Juangelina, Felipe's grandmother
- Tim Meadows as Ted
- Santiago Segura as Eduardo
- Nick Swardson as Todd
- Allen Covert as Otto, a homeless man who attends Jack's Thanksgiving dinner. Covert played a similar role in Happy Gilmore, in which he is also a caddy for the titular character.
- Rohan Chand as Gary Sadelstein, Jack and Erin's adoptive son and Jill's nephew
- Elodie Tougne as Sofia Sadelstein, Jack and Erin's biological daughter and Jill's niece
- Geoff Pierson as Carter Simmons, Erin's father and Jack's father-in-law
- Valerie Mahaffey as Bitsy Simmons, Erin's mother and Jack's mother-in-law
- Gad Elmaleh as Xavier
- Kristin Davis as Delilah
- Norm Macdonald as "Funbucket", Jill's blind date
- Julia Perri as Sally Cashier
- Dana Carvey as a Scrapply Puppeteer
- David Spade as Monica
- Jackie Seiden as Tracy
- Georgia Hatzis as Carol

The film features cameos from Johnny Depp, Regis Philbin (in his final film appearance), Dan Patrick, Shaquille O'Neal, Drew Carey, John McEnroe, Christie Brinkley, Bill Romanowski, Michael Irvin, Jared Fogle, Billy Blanks, Vince Offer, Günter Schlierkamp and Caitlyn Jenner (the latter prior to her transition, as Bruce Jenner) as themselves.

== Production ==
In May 2006, it was reported that Sony Pictures had acquired a comedy pitch Jack and Jill with Adam Sandler in negotiations to act in and produce the film through his company Happy Madison Productions alongside Todd Garner and Broken Road Productions. In October 2009, it was reported that Sandler had agreed to produce Jack and Jill where he would play both twins, the titular Jack and Jill. The script was written by Sandler, Steve Koren, and Robert Smigel. In September 2010, Katie Holmes joined the cast of Jack and Jill, which would be directed by Dennis Dugan. By November of that year, it was reported that Al Pacino had joined the cast playing a fictionalized version of himself. Dugan stated that it was always the intention of having Sandler play both roles in the film, but they didn't want to go the approach of Mrs. Doubtfire with the prosthetics and wanted Jill to resemble a "female version of Jack" and play up the unattractiveness of Sandler as a woman as part of the comedy.

In 2024, Pacino elaborated on his decision to join the cast of the film, stating, "It came at a time in my life that I needed it, because it was after I found out I had no more money. My accountant was in prison, and I needed something quickly. So I took Jack and Jill."

== Reception ==
=== Box office ===
The film opened in 3,438 theaters at #2 with $25,003,575, behind Immortals, which debuted in the top spot with $32,206,425. The film closed on February 26, 2012, with a total gross of $74,158,157 in North America. It also made $75,515,631 in other territories, for a total worldwide gross of $149,673,788 against its $79 million budget.

=== Critical response ===
Unusually, Jack and Jill was screened for critics in Ireland, but not in the United Kingdom. It was panned by reviewers. On the review aggregator website Rotten Tomatoes, 3% of 115 critics' reviews are positive, with an average rating of 2.9/10. The website's consensus reads: "Although it features an inexplicably committed performance from Al Pacino, Jack and Jill is impossible to recommend on any level whatsoever." Metacritic, which uses a weighted average, assigned the film a score of 23 out of 100, based on 26 critics, indicating "generally unfavorable" reviews. Audiences polled by CinemaScore gave the film an average grade of "B" on a scale of A+ to F.

On the day of the premiere, comedians such as Jake Fogelnest launched a parody promotional account on Twitter bashing the film, garnering hundreds of followers and having its posts retweeted by figures such as Aziz Ansari, Paul Scheer and Alan Sepinwall. It was taken down by Twitter that evening due to a complaint from a Sony executive. Critics from The Daily Beast, The Austin Chronicle and Time declared Jack and Jill to be the worst Adam Sandler film. Issues echoing critique of other Sandler films were present and even amplified in Jack and Jill. Common criticisms were targeted toward the crude humor, product placement, celebrity cameos, and a sentimental ending that contradicts the film's mostly mean-spirited tone.

The A.V. Club's Scott Tobias critiqued Sandler's lack of passion, describing most scenes with the actor "waiting around for somebody to feed him a line". Time contributor Mary Pols described a joke about Jack's obsessed fear of anti-semitism as a punch line with no joke. Peter Travers of Rolling Stone also argued, "Al Pacino said something great. After he looks at himself in the commercial, he says, 'Burn this! Nobody must ever see this!' That's my review of Jack and Jill." Andrew Barker of Variety said that the film's "general stupidity, careless direction and reliance on a single-joke premise that was never really funny to begin with are only the most obvious of its problems".

Pacino's performance was positively received, and some critics noted it to be one of the film's best parts, although his presence was questioned. The London Evening Standard found the actor (playing himself) to be "slumming" it in providing Jill one of the film's few funny parts. Despite generally scathing reviews, the film did receive some positive reception. Mick LaSalle of the San Francisco Chronicle stated that while he found the character Jill annoying, "almost everything else in this comedy succeeds. The central situation...has comic energy... (the film has) successful bits and big moments of satisfying comedy." Tom Russo of The Boston Globe gave the film two-and-a-half stars out of a possible four, writing, "What's more genuinely wacky is what a kick this movie can sometimes be, completely in spite of its big, flat stunt." Armond White of CityArts praised the film's "comic introspection", writing that "Sandler's comedies are not 'dumb fun', maybe that's why they're not in critics' favor."

Jack and Jill was in the top five of numerous critics' lists of the worst films of 2011, ranking number one on those of People's Alynda Wheat, the Miami Herald's Rene Rodriguez, Time's Mary Pols, The A.V. Club staff, and the Sioux City Journal's Bruce Miller. For Rolling Stone, Peter Travers ranked it the year's second-worst film and tied Sandler's performance with Anne Hathaway in One Day for his recognition of worst actor of the year. Since then, it has been called one of the worst films of all time by the Evening Standard and Rotten Tomatoes, as well as one of the worst Sandler films by Variety.

=== Accolades ===
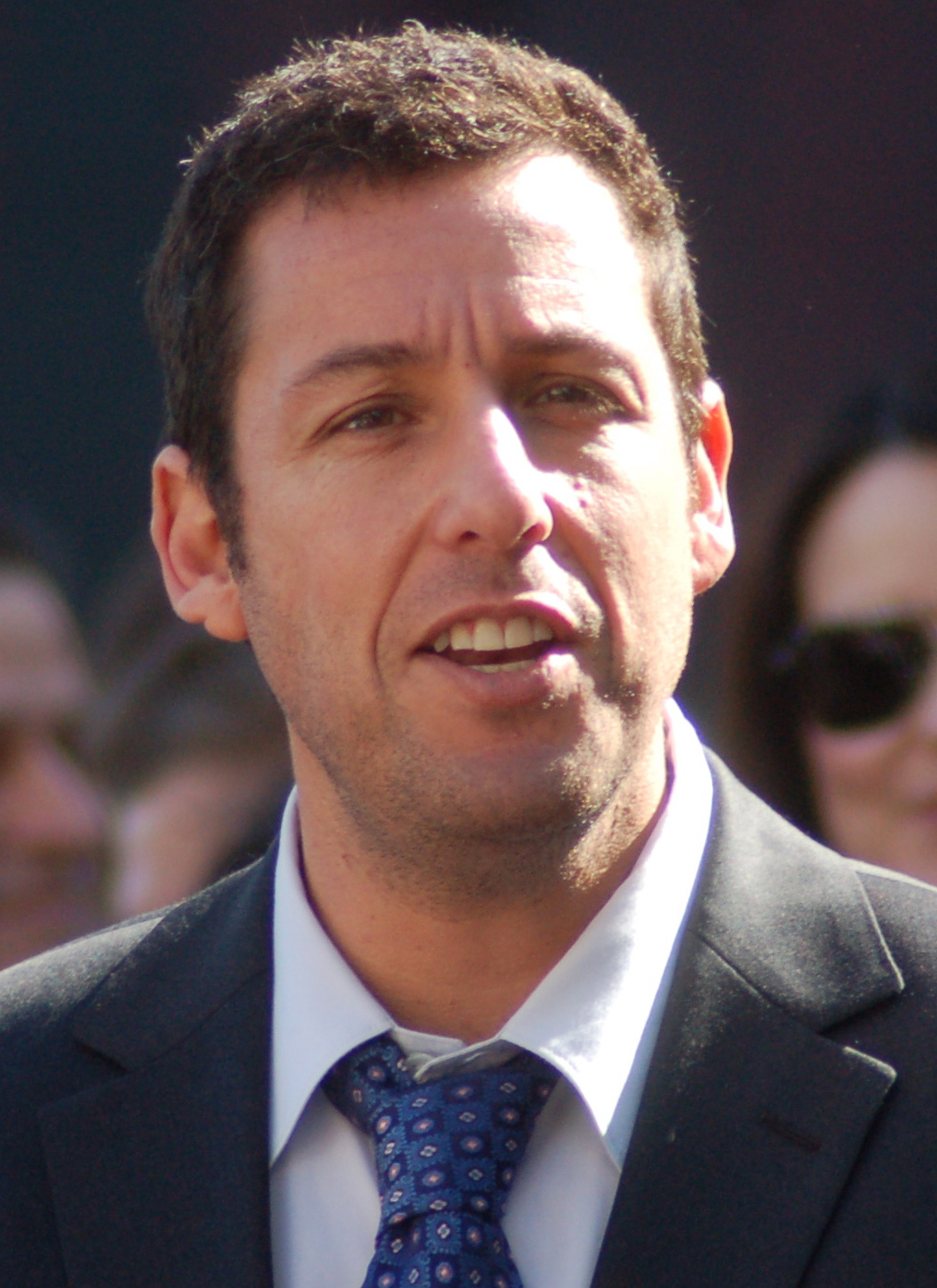
Adam Sandler (pictured) broke the record for the most nominations in a single ceremony of the Razzies for Jack and Jill, Bucky Larson: Born to Be a Star, and Just Go with It.

At the 32nd Golden Raspberry Awards, Jack and Jill won all 10 categories, a first in the 32-year history of the annual parody event: Worst Picture (for Sandler, Jack Giarraputo, and Todd Garner), Worst Actor and Worst Actress (for Sandler), Worst Supporting Actor (for Swardson and Pacino, which the latter won), Worst Supporting Actress (for Holmes and Spade in drag, which the latter won), Worst Director (for Dugan), Worst Screenplay (for Sandler, Ben Zook, and Steve Koren), Worst Screen Couple (for Sandler and either Pacino, Holmes or Sandler), Worst Ensemble and Worst Prequel, Remake, Rip-off or Sequel. Sandler also set another Razzie record by garnering 11 personal nominations in total, breaking Eddie Murphy's 2008 five-nomination record for the most garnered by one individual in a single ceremony (for Norbit). In addition to Jack and Jill, he was also nominated for Worst Picture, Worst Prequel, Remake, Rip-Off, or Sequel, and Worst Screenplay nominations for Bucky Larson: Born to Be a Star; and two Worst Screen Couple awards for Just Go with It. Razzie founder John J. B. Wilson called "almost karmic for someone to have made that much razz-able stuff in one year", suggesting the actor "angered someone really powerful, I would say".

Award	Category	Nominee(s)	Result	Ref.
Alliance of Women Film Journalists	Hall of Shame	Production and Cast	Nominated	
ASCAP Film and Television Music Awards	Top Box Office Films	Rupert Gregson-Williams	Won	
Golden Raspberry Awards	Worst Picture	Todd Garner, Jack Giarraputo and Adam Sandler	Won	
Golden Raspberry Awards	Worst Director	Dennis Dugan	Won	
Golden Raspberry Awards	Worst Actor	Adam Sandler (also for Just Go with It)	Won	
Golden Raspberry Awards	Worst Actress	Adam Sandler (in drag)	Won	
Golden Raspberry Awards	Worst Supporting Actor	Al Pacino (as himself)	Won	
Golden Raspberry Awards	Worst Supporting Actor	Nick Swardson (also for Just Go with It)	Nominated	
Golden Raspberry Awards	Worst Supporting Actress	Katie Holmes	Nominated	
Golden Raspberry Awards	Worst Supporting Actress	David Spade (in drag)	Won	
Golden Raspberry Awards	Worst Screenplay	Screenplay by Adam Sandler and Steve Koren; Story by Ben Zook	Won	
Golden Raspberry Awards	Worst Screen Couple	Adam Sandler and either Katie Holmes, Al Pacino, or himself (in drag)	Won	
Golden Raspberry Awards	Worst Screen Ensemble	The entire cast	Won	
Golden Raspberry Awards	Worst Prequel, Remake, Rip-Off or Sequel	Rip-off/Remake of Glen or Glenda	Won	
Golden Schmoes Awards	Worst Movie of the Year		Won	
Houston Film Critics Society Awards	Worst Picture		Nominated	
Internet Film Critic Society Awards	Worst Film		Won	
Kids' Choice Awards	Favorite Movie Actor	Adam Sandler	Won	
Women Film Critics Circle Awards	Worst Female Images in a Movie		Nominated	

== See also ==
- List of 21st century films considered the worst
