= Bedtime Stories (film) =

- Theatrical release poster
- Directed by: Adam Shankman
- Screenplay by: Matt Lopez; Tim Herlihy
- Story by: Matt Lopez
- Produced by: Andrew Gunn; Adam Sandler; Jack Giarraputo
- Starring: Adam Sandler; Keri Russell; Guy Pearce; Russell Brand; Richard Griffiths; Jonathan Pryce; Courteney Cox; Lucy Lawless; Teresa Palmer
- Cinematography: Michael Barrett
- Edited by: Tom Costain; Michael Tronick
- Music by: Rupert Gregson-Williams
- Production companies: Walt Disney Pictures; Happy Madison Productions; Gunn Films; Offspring Entertainment
- Distributed by: Walt Disney Studios; Motion Pictures
- Release date: December 25, 2008
- Running time: 99 minutes
- Country: United States
- Language: English
- Budget: $80 million
- Box office: $212.9 million

Bedtime Stories is a 2008 American fantasy comedy film directed by Adam Shankman from a screenplay by Matt Lopez and Tim Herlihy based on a story by Lopez. It stars Adam Sandler in his first appearance in a family-friendly film alongside Keri Russell, Guy Pearce, Russell Brand, Aisha Tyler, Richard Griffiths, Teresa Palmer, Lucy Lawless, and Courteney Cox. In the film, a hotel handyman's stories to his niece and nephew come true, and his stories become more outlandish. Sandler's film production company Happy Madison Productions and Andrew Gunn's film production company Gunn Films produced the film with Walt Disney Pictures.

The film was released on December 25, 2008, by Walt Disney Studios Motion Pictures. Despite the film being a box office success, earning $212.9 million against an $80 million budget, it received generally negative reviews from critics.

== Plot ==
In 1974, Skeeter and Wendy Bronson are raised by their father Marty at the family business, the Sunny Vista Motel. However, despite being a good hotelier and host, Marty faces serious financial problems and almost goes bankrupt. Marty sells the motel to his good friend Barry Nottingham, the severely germaphobic CEO and founder of hotel chain Nottingham Hotels, in a forced liquidation. Nottingham rebuilds and renovates the motel into a luxury hotel named the Sunny Vista Nottingham, on the condition that Skeeter will run it when he is grown up. 34 years later, Skeeter is stuck as the hotel's hardworking repairman. Nottingham announces plans to close the hotel in order to build a bigger one, named the Sunny Vista Mega Nottingham, and appoints the snotty Kendall Duncan as its future manager, simply because he is dating Nottingham's daughter, Violet, though he is secretly having an affair with the hotel manager Aspen.

Upon visiting his niece's birthday party, Wendy asks Skeeter to watch her two children, Bobbi and Patrick, because the school at which she is the principal is closing down and she is looking for a job in Arizona. The first night, Skeeter cynically tells them a bedtime story in which he casts himself as an underdog peasant in a medieval fantasy world, who is unfairly passed over for promotion. Dissatisfied with the story's unhappy ending, the children add that he at least gets a chance at the promotion and that it starts raining gumballs.

The next day, the story miraculously comes true: Nottingham, recalling the original promise he made to Marty, gives Skeeter a shot at the manager position; and on his way home, gumballs rain on Skeeter from a truck crash on an overpass. The next night, at the hotel, Skeeter tells a wild west-style story in which he, as a cowboy, is freely given an expensive horse named Ferrari, and saves a troubled damsel from bandits. Going out later that night, he saves Violet from obnoxious paparazzi. He then sees Violet's Ferrari car and mistakenly thinks she will give it to him before Violet drives away. Skeeter realizes that only the children's additions to the stories come true. The night after that, Skeeter, with the children's help, tells a story about a chariot-riding stuntman in Ancient Greece who wins a date with the "fairest maiden in the land". The next day, Skeeter ends up spending the day with and falling for his sister's friend and colleague Jill.

On Skeeter's last night with the children, he tells them a space opera-style story in which he triumphs over Kendall in a duel. The children, recalling how Skeeter told them on their first night that there are no happy endings in real life, add that someone kills him with a fireball. Skeeter and Kendall both make presentations on how best to market the hotel. With his heartfelt speech on family, Skeeter ultimately wins the managerial position. However, he learns from Kendall that the new Nottingham Hotel will be at the location of the closing school and, paranoid against fire due to the story, blasts a fire extinguisher at Nottingham's cake and is "fired".

Skeeter, much to the surprise of Jill and Nottingham, manages to get the hotel's location moved to the beachfront in Santa Monica. Skeeter and Jill then take a wild motorcycle ride to the school to prevent it from being demolished. While at the site, protesting the school's closure, Bobbi and Patrick sneak into the building to give their sign a better view. Skeeter and Jill arrive just in time to stop Kendall from setting off the highly sensitive explosives, saving the children and the school.

Sometime later, Skeeter marries Jill and opens a motel named after his father, with Kendall and Aspen demoted to the motel's waiting staff. Violet marries Skeeter's best friend, Mickey, giving him control of the Nottingham Empire. Nottingham overcomes his extreme germaphobia, quitting the hotel industry to become a school nurse, and newlywed Skeeter and Jill have a baby boy.

== Cast ==
- Adam Sandler as Skeeter Bronson
  - Thomas Hoffman as Young Skeeter Bronson
- Keri Russell as Jill Hastings, Skeeter's love interest later wife
- Guy Pearce as Kendall Duncan, Skeeter's rival
- Russell Brand as Mickey, Skeeter's best friend
- Richard Griffiths as Barry Nottingham
  - Tim Herlihy as Young Barry Nottingham
- Jonathan Pryce as Martin "Marty" Bronson, Skeeter's deceased father
- Courteney Cox as Wendy Bronson, Skeeter's older sister
  - Abigail Droeger as Young Wendy Bronson
- Lucy Lawless as Aspen, Kendall's girlfriend
- Teresa Palmer as Violet Nottingham, Barry's daughter and Mickey's love interest later wife
- Aisha Tyler as Donna Hynde
- Laura Ann Kesling as Bobbi Bronson, Wendy's daughter and Patrick's younger sister
- Jonathan Morgan Heit as Patrick Bronson, Wendy's son and Bobbi's older brother
- Kathryn Joosten as Mrs. Dixon
  - Melany Mitchell as Young Mrs. Dixon
- Andrew Collins as Mr. Dixon
- Annalise Basso as Tricia Sparks
- Nick Swardson as Engineer
- Allen Covert as Ferrari Guy
- Carmen Electra as Hot Girl
- Blake Clark and Bill Romanowski as Bikers
- Mikey Post as Angry Dwarf / Jimmy
- Rob Schneider as Indian Chief / The Robber (uncredited)
- Arne Starr as Nottingham Employee / Senator / Cowboy / Spaceman (uncredited)
- Jonathan Loughran and Bob Harvey as Party Guests

== Production ==
Director Adam Shankman describes Adam Sandler's character as "a sort of 'Cinderfella' character" and adds that "'He's like Han Solo ...'" It was filmed at various locations in California, including in Thousand Oaks where Mr. Nottingham's palace is set.

== Music ==
Bedtime Stories

Film score by Rupert Gregson-Williams
- Released: December 23, 2008
- Genres: Soundtrack, film score
- Length: 35:11
- Label: Walt Disney

The score to Bedtime Stories was composed by Rupert Gregson-Williams, who recorded his score with the Hollywood Studio Symphony at the Newman Scoring Stage at 20th Century Fox. The song "Don't Stop Believin'" is played during the film and during the end credits.

No.	Title	Length
1.	"The Sunny Vista Motel"	4:15
2.	"The Tale of Sir Fixalot"	3:04
3.	"Raining Gumballs"	1:16
4.	"The Fat Mouse"	1:54
5.	"The Wild West Adventure"	2:15
6.	"Rooftop Camp Out"	2:34
7.	"The Legend of Skeetacus"	1:57
8.	"Almost a Kiss"	1:53
9.	"Space Odyssey"	3:08
10.	"Skeeter's Pitch"	3:17
11.	"At the Nottingham Broadway Mega Resort" (Performed by Guy Pearce)	1:18
12.	"You're Supposed To Be the Good Guy"	3:49
13.	"Motorcycle Rescue"	3:26
14.	"Happily Ever After"	1:07

== Theatrical release ==
The film was released in the United States on December 25, 2008, in Poland on January 23, 2009, and in Sweden on February 20, 2009.

== Reception ==
=== Critical response ===
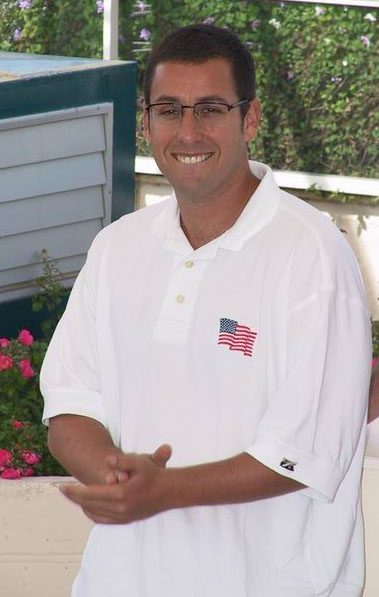
Adam Sandler at Cannes in 2002

On Rotten Tomatoes, Bedtime Stories has an approval rating of 27% based on 111 reviews, with an average rating of 4.4/10. The site's consensus states, "Though it may earn some chuckles from pre-teens, this kid-friendly Adam Sandler comedy is uneven, poorly paced, and lacks the requisite whimsy to truly work." On Metacritic, the film has a weighted average score of 33 out of 100 based on 26 reviews, "generally unfavorable" reviews. Audiences surveyed by CinemaScore gave the film a grade B+ on scale of A to F.

=== Box office ===
Slashfilm predicted that Bedtime Stories would open No. 1 during the December 25–28, 2008 Christmas weekend due to its family appeal and the box office draw of Adam Sandler, but it came at No. 3 grossing $38 million behind Marley & Me and The Curious Case of Benjamin Button. However, during the standard 3-day weekend, it jumped ahead of The Curious Case of Benjamin Button ranking No. 2 behind Marley & Me with $27.5 million. As of February 2009, the film had grossed $110,101,975 in the United States and Canada and $102,772,467 in other countries, totaling $212,874,442 worldwide.

== Home media ==
Bedtime Stories was released on Blu-ray and DVD on April 7, 2009, by Walt Disney Studios Home Entertainment. The DVD was released as a single disc or a two-disc edition including behind-the-scenes featurettes. Commercials advertising the discs feature background music recycled from the film Back to the Future Part III. As of November 1, 2009, the DVD has sold 2,835,662 copies generating $49,409,944 in sales revenue.

== Accolades ==
Australian Film Institute 2009

Award	Category	Nominee	Result
AFI International Award	Best Actor	Guy Pearce	Nominated

BMI Film & TV Awards 2009

Award	Nominee	Result
BMI Film Music Award	Rupert Gregson-Williams	Won

Kids' Choice Awards, USA 2009

Award	Category	Nominee	Result
Blimp Award	Favorite Movie; Favorite Movie Actor	Adam Sandler	Nominated

Motion Picture Sound Editors, USA 2009

Award	Category	Nominee	Result
Golden Reel Award	Best Sound Editing - Music in a Feature Film	J.J. George (supervising music editor); Kevin Crehan (music editor); Tom Kramer (music editor)	Nominated

Young Artist Awards 2009

Award	Category	Nominee	Result
Young Artist Award	Best Performance in a Feature Film - Supporting Young Actor	Johntae Lipscomb	Nominated
