= Jack Giarraputo =

American film producer

Jack Giarraputo is an American film producer who co-founded Happy Madison Productions in 1999 with Adam Sandler.

== Film career ==
Most of his work with Happy Madison has been in films starring Adam Sandler from Happy Gilmore onward, including The Waterboy, Billy Madison, The Wedding Singer, and The Longest Yard, amongst others.

In 2016, Giarraputo retired from day to day film production after producing the Sandler comedy Blended, and the Chris Columbus-directed Pixels, stating that he wants to focus more on raising his family.

In 2021, he launched Slice Collective, an advertising agency co-founded with Abhishek Som, former Lazard private equity executive, which aims to produce Hollywood-level campaigns for clients around the world.

== Personal life ==
Giarraputo was born in Brookhaven, New York and graduated from Patchogue-Medford High School in Patchogue, New York.

== Filmography ==
- Billy Madison (1995) (associate producer)
- Heavyweights (1995) (associate producer)
- Happy Gilmore (1996) (co-producer)
- Bulletproof (1996) (co-producer)
- The Wedding Singer (1998)
- The Waterboy (1998)
- Big Daddy (1999)
- Deuce Bigalow: Male Gigolo (1999) (executive producer)
- Little Nicky (2000)
- Joe Dirt (2001) (executive producer)
- The Animal (2001) (executive producer)
- Mr. Deeds (2002)
- The Master of Disguise (2002) (executive producer)
- Eight Crazy Nights (2002)
- The Hot Chick (2002) (executive producer)
- Anger Management (2003)
- Dickie Roberts: Former Child Star (2003)
- 50 First Dates (2004)
- The Longest Yard (2005)
- Deuce Bigalow: European Gigolo (2005)
- Grandma's Boy (2006) (executive producer)
- The Benchwarmers (2006)
- Click (2006)
- Rules of Engagement (2007-2013 television series)
- Reign Over Me (2007) (executive producer)
- I Now Pronounce You Chuck & Larry (2007)
- Strange Wilderness (2008) (executive producer)
- You Don't Mess with the Zohan (2008)
- The House Bunny (2008)
- Bedtime Stories (2008)
- Paul Blart: Mall Cop (2009)
- Funny People (2009) (executive producer)
- The Shortcut (2009) (executive producer)
- Grown Ups (2010)
- Just Go with It (2011)
- Breaking In (2011-2012 television series)
- Zookeeper (2011)
- Bucky Larson: Born to Be a Star (2011)
- Jack and Jill (2011)
- That's My Boy (2012)
- Here Comes the Boom (2012) (executive producer)
- Grown Ups 2 (2013)
- Blended (2014)
- Paul Blart: Mall Cop 2 (2015)
- Pixels (2015) (executive producer)
- Happy Gilmore 2 (2025)
- Grown Ups 3 (TBA)
