= Zookeeper (film) =

2011 film by Frank Coraci

- Theatrical release poster
- Directed by: Frank Coraci
- Screenplay by: Nick Bakay; Rock Reuben; Kevin James; Jay Scherick; David Ronn
- Story by: Jay Scherick; David Ronn
- Produced by: Todd Garner; Kevin James; Adam Sandler; Jack Giarraputo; Walt Becker
- Starring: Kevin James; Rosario Dawson; Leslie Bibb; Ken Jeong; Donnie Wahlberg; Adam Sandler; Nick Nolte; Cher; Maya Rudolph; Sylvester Stallone; Jon Favreau
- Cinematography: Michael Barrett
- Edited by: Scott Hill
- Music by: Rupert Gregson-Williams
- Production companies: Columbia Pictures; Metro-Goldwyn-Mayer Pictures; Broken Road Productions; Hey Eddie; Happy Madison Productions
- Distributed by: Sony Pictures Releasing
- Release date: July 8, 2011 (United States)
- Running time: 103 minutes
- Country: United States
- Language: English
- Budget: $80 million
- Box office: $170 million

Zookeeper is a 2011 American comedy film directed by Frank Coraci, with a screenplay by Nick Bakay, Rock Reuben, Kevin James, Jay Scherick, and David Ronn, from a story by Scherick and Ronn, and produced by Todd Garner, James, Adam Sandler, Jack Giarraputo, and Walt Becker. The film stars James, Rosario Dawson, Leslie Bibb, Ken Jeong, Donnie Wahlberg, Nat Faxon, Joe Rogan, and features the voices of Cher, Nick Nolte, Sandler, Sylvester Stallone, Judd Apatow, Jim Breuer, Jon Favreau, Faizon Love, Richie Minervini, Maya Rudolph, Bas Rutten and Don Rickles in his final film role. It tells the story about an unlucky zookeeper and the talking animals at his zoo who break their silence to help him find love.

Filming began in Boston on August 17, 2009. It was the first Metro-Goldwyn-Mayer Pictures (MGM) film to be co-produced with Happy Madison, as well as MGM's first production to be released after it had filed for bankruptcy the year prior, though the film, like a majority of the Happy Madison output, was distributed by Columbia Pictures. Zookeeper was released in the United States on July 8, 2011. It received generally negative reviews and grossed $170 million on an $80 million budget.

== Plot ==
In Boston, zookeeper Griffin Keyes proposes to his girlfriend Stephanie, but is turned down. She says his career as a zookeeper is the reason, breaking his heart. 5 years later, Griffin is now the head zookeeper at the Franklin Park Zoo, caring deeply for the animals. That night, Griffin holds an engagement party there for his brother Dave, but freaks out when he discovers that Stephanie was invited. Dave suggests that Griffin work with him at his car dealership to get Stephanie back, so Griffin considers doing it.

The animals hold a meeting that evening as they feel that Griffin is the best zookeeper, so they decide to find some way to help him win back Stephanie without leaving the zoo. Jerome the brown bear suggests that they teach Griffin their mating techniques, but Joe the lion protests, reminding them that it's against the animal code to talk to humans. Donald the monkey suggests that they make Griffin look like a hero when Stephanie is at the zoo tomorrow.

The next day, Donald lets out Joe, who confronts Stephanie and Dave's fiancée Robin. However, Griffin screws up the animals' plan by failing to jump into the lion enclosure, and instead Joe is captured by Kate, the zoo veterinarian. When he climbs out of the enclosure, Joe accidentally yells at Griffin in frustration, Griffin runs back home, thinking he went crazy. The next day at the zoo, Griffin observes Joe in an attempt to catch him talking. After nothing happens, when Griffin gives Barry the elephant food, Joe confronts him and tells him that he wants to talk and they want to talk to each other, but Griffin is knocked unconscious in an attempt to run away. That night, he wakes up and is surrounded by the animals, who break the code of silence and tell him that they will teach him to win back Stephanie. He learns their different mating rituals, ending up humiliating himself at a party in front of the other zookeepers and the guests.

Griffin then has a talk with Bernie, a forlorn gorilla who has spent years in a deep enclosure after allegedly attacking a zookeeper named Shane. Bernie tells Griffin that Shane fell when he was abusing him, and lied, saying that Bernie attacked him, causing the zoo to close down Bernie's enclosure and move him into the cement pit he hates. This also caused Bernie to mistrust humans. Griffin, empathizing with Bernie, decides to take him out on the town (posing him as a guy in a costume), and the two bond as they become friends.

Griffin discovers that Stephanie is dating another ex-boyfriend, a bully named Gale. After a cycling showdown with Gale ends in failure, Joe's mate Janet tells Griffin that the best way to attract a female is to be seen with another female, so Griffin asks Kate to go with him to Dave and Robin's wedding. Griffin successfully grabs Stephanie's attention by first showing off with Kate, then standing up to Gale. Stephanie asks him out to dinner, and after they go to a fashion show, Stephanie convinces Griffin to quit his job because he is being held back by it. Griffin accepts Dave's job offer and begins working at the car dealership. This upsets Kate, who is convinced that Stephanie is changing him into who she wants him to be and also Bernie, who tells him that Griffin quitting proves that he cannot trust humans. As he leaves, Griffin warns Shane not to hurt Bernie. Kate decides to leave the zoo and accepts a job in Nairobi.

Griffin becomes a star employee at the car dealership, but finds out that he misses working at the zoo. When Stephanie proposes to him in the midst of his success, he refuses without hesitation, dumping her as he realizes that she doesn't truly love or accept him for who he is and that their relationship was all conditional to her, much to Stephanie's dismay and anger. He then goes to the zoo, apologizing to Bernie who he sees has been beaten by Shane. The animals tell him that Kate is heading to the airport, so Griffin heads out to stop her; stopping at Shane's house first to kick him into a wall for hurting Bernie again. With Bernie's help, Griffin manages to catch Kate on a bridge and admits he was wrong to think he had to change himself to be happy and confesses his love for her, and the two kiss.

Six months later, Griffin and Kate have started a loving relationship and are back at the zoo. Bernie is also now living in a new enclosure where he gets a great view of the city.

== Cast ==
=== Humans ===
- Kevin James as Griffin Keyes, the lead zookeeper
- Rosario Dawson as Kate Cooper, the zoo's veterinarian and Griffin's love interest.
- Leslie Bibb as Stephanie, Griffin's vain ex-girlfriend.
- Ken Jeong as Venom, a worker at the reptile house, and a friend of Griffin.
- Donnie Wahlberg as Shane, Griffin's rival, an abusive zookeeper
- Joe Rogan as Gale, Stephanie's ex-boyfriend.
- Nat Faxon as Dave Keyes, Griffin's younger brother.
- Steffiana de la Cruz as Robin Keyes, Dave's fiancé later turned wife. De La Cruz is the real life wife of Kevin James.
- Thomas Gottschalk as Jürgen Mavroc
- Brandon Keener as Nimer

=== Animals ===
- Tom Woodruff Jr. as Bernie (in-suit performance), a Western lowland gorilla, and Griffin's best friend.
- Crystal the Monkey as Donald, a tufted capuchin.
- Bart the Bear 2 as Jerome, a grizzly bear, who is Bruce's brother.
- Honey Bump Bear as Bruce, a Kodiak bear, who is Jerome's brother.
- Tweet as Mollie, a reticulated giraffe speaking with a South-Western accent.

==== Animal voice cast ====
- Cher as Janet, a lioness, and Joe's wife.
- Nick Nolte as Bernie
- Adam Sandler as Donald
- Sylvester Stallone as Joe, an African lion, and Janet's husband.
- Judd Apatow as Barry, an Indian elephant.
- Jim Breuer as Spike (credited as "Crow"), a crow.
- Jon Favreau as Jerome
- Faizon Love as Bruce
- Richie Minervini as Elmo (credited as "Ostrich"), an ostrich.
- Maya Rudolph as Mollie
- Bas Rutten as Sebastian, a wolf.
- Don Rickles as Jim (credited as "Frog"), an American bullfrog.

== Production ==
=== Development ===
On April 22, 2008, it was announced that Metro-Goldwyn-Mayer (MGM) had purchased the script of the film, for $2 million, beating DreamWorks Pictures and Walt Disney Pictures, and with Walt Becker attached to direct and produce.

=== Filming and giraffe's death ===
Filming began in Boston on August 17, 2009, aiming for a release on October 8, 2010, which was then delayed to July 8, 2011. Filming ended on October 30, 2009.

Tweet, the giraffe who rose to fame as a star in the classic Toys "R" Us commercials (by being cast as Geoffrey, the company's official mascot) and who appeared alongside Jim Carrey in the film Ace Ventura: Pet Detective, died after filming Zookeeper at the Franklin Park Zoo. 18-year-old giraffe Tweet died after eating pieces of blue tarp that covered his cage. He was being held in a 20-by-20 foot stall and collapsed in his pen, causing PETA to come down hard on the filmmakers and stage protests at the film's premiere.

The two bears in this live action film were performed by Heber City, Utah's Wasatch Rocky Mountain Wildlife veteran Grizzly actors Bart the Bear 2 and Honey Bump.

Tai the elephant was featured in a video, reportedly filmed in 2005 and released in 2011 by Animal Defenders International (ADI), which showed her being abused by its trainers. A campaign to boycott the movie was formed since the outbreak of the news. ADI has also contacted the American Humane Association, urging them to re-evaluate how they assess the use of animals in films and the statements being made which effectively endorse the use of performing animals. Animal rights advocates PETA also urged the public to boycott the film.

== Music ==
=== Soundtrack ===
- "I'll Supply the Love" – Performed by Toto
- "Carry On Wayward Son" – Performed by Kansas
- "Anything for You" – Performed by The Axis
- "Smokin'" – Performed by Boston
- "Low" – Performed by Flo Rida featuring T-Pain
- "Unbelievable" – Performed by EMF
- "Two Out of Three Ain't Bad" – Performed by Meat Loaf
- "Kickstart My Heart" – Performed by Mötley Crüe
- "Boogie Wonderland" – Performed by Earth, Wind & Fire
- "You're the First, the Last, My Everything" – Performed by Barry White
- "Bebop Blues" – Performed by Peter Blair Jazz Quartet
- "Easy" – Performed by Commodores
- "Kiss You All Over" – Performed by Exile
- "Ball of Confusion (That's What the World Is Today)" – Performed by Love and Rockets
- "(Shake, Shake, Shake) Shake Your Booty" – Performed by KC & The Sunshine Band
- "So Much Class" – Performed by Doctor Jay featuring J. Sabin
- "In the Car Crash" – Performed by Swayzak
- "Yoga Music" – Written and Performed by Ana Brett, Ravi Singh and Tom Carden
- "Cum On Feel the Noize" – Performed by Quiet Riot
- "More Than a Feeling" – Performed by Boston

== Release ==
=== Theatrical ===
Around 50 people came to the film's premiere at the Regency Village Theatre in Westwood, Los Angeles, California, to protest against the filmmakers for their alleged animal abuse. Frank Coraci claimed that the animals were not harmed during production. In an interview, Coraci stated, "... We worked with people who love their animals and [the American] Humane Association was there to ensure that they were being treated correctly. We didn't do anything that we shouldn't do. We treated the animals with love and respect."

=== Home media ===
Zookeeper was released on DVD and Blu-ray on October 11, 2011, by Sony Pictures Home Entertainment.

== Reception ==
=== Box office ===
Zookeeper made its debut in 3,482 theaters in the United States and Canada. It grossed $7.4 million on its opening day and $20.1 million on its opening weekend, ranking it #3 for the weekend behind holdover Transformers: Dark of the Moon and newcomer Horrible Bosses. The film grossed a worldwide total of $170 million against a production budget of $80 million.

=== Critical response ===
On the review aggregator website Rotten Tomatoes, 13% of 130 critics' reviews are positive, with an average rating of 3.6/10. The website's consensus reads: "Zookeeper smothers Kevin James's with a sodden script and a surfeit of jokes inappropriate for the young viewers who would be intrigued by its juvenile storyline." On Metacritic, it has a weighted average score of 30 out of 100, based on reviews from 29 critics, indicating "generally unfavorable" reviews. Audiences polled by CinemaScore gave the film an average grade of "B+" on an A+ to F scale.

Brian Lowry of Variety called it "a marketing pitch in search of a movie" and a "punishingly flat effort that offers barely enough comedy to populate a three-minute trailer." Todd McCarthy of The Hollywood Reporter said "it's dreadful in every respect" and called it an "archly mirthless comedy". Despite his criticism he offers some small praise: "Although one would never have expected to find her in a film like this, Dawson, by dint of enthusiasm, is the only actor who rises above the material with her dignity intact." Ignatiy Vishnevetsky, who co-hosts the film review series Ebert Presents: At the Movies, said that "even though the movie looks hilarious from the trailer, it is only hilarious if you enjoy seeing Kevin James fall down a lot". He gave the film a "thumbs down," as did Christy Lemire, the other co-host of the series.

Roger Ebert of the Chicago Sun-Times gave the film three out of four, stating, "Look, a great movie this is not. A pleasant summer entertainment it is. I think it can play for all ages in a family audience... and besides, I'm getting a teensy bit exhausted by cute little animated animals. The creatures in this zoo all have the excellent taste to be in 2D." Sean O'Connell of The Washington Post wrote: "Pratfalls and agonizing tumbles appear to be James's business, and man, business is booming."

=== Accolades ===
Mary Pols of Time named it one of the Top 10 Worst Movies of 2011. British newspaper The Telegraph named Zookeeper one of the ten worst films of 2011, saying "Portly Kevin James is the hero of this "comedy", which boasts five screenwriters and not a single amusing moment."

Award	Category	Recipients	Result
Teen Choice Award	Choice Summer Movie Star – Female	Rosario Dawson	Nominated
Razzie Award	Worst Supporting Actor	Ken Jeong	Nominated
