= Bucky Larson: Born to Be a Star =

2011 film by Tom Brady

- Theatrical release poster
- Directed by: Tom Brady
- Written by: Adam Sandler; Allen Covert; Nick Swardson
- Produced by: Adam Sandler; Jack Giarraputo; Allen Covert; Nick Swardson; David S. Dorfman
- Starring: Nick Swardson; Christina Ricci; Edward Herrmann; Kevin Nealon; Don Johnson; Stephen Dorff
- Cinematography: Michael Barrett
- Edited by: Jason Gourson
- Music by: Waddy Wachtel
- Production companies: Columbia Pictures; Happy Madison Productions; Miles Deep Productions
- Distributed by: Sony Pictures Releasing
- Release date: September 9, 2011
- Running time: 97 minutes
- Country: United States
- Language: English
- Budget: $10 million
- Box office: $2.5 million

Bucky Larson: Born to Be a Star is a 2011 American comedy film directed by Tom Brady, written by Adam Sandler, Allen Covert, and Nick Swardson, and produced by Sandler, Swardson, Covert, Jack Giarraputo, and David S. Dorfman. Starring Swardson, Christina Ricci, Edward Herrmann, Kevin Nealon, Don Johnson, and Stephen Dorff, it tells the story of a man-child whose reserved parents were famous porn stars and plans to follow in their footsteps.

Produced by Sandler's Happy Madison Productions in association with Miles Deep Productions, Bucky Larson: Born to Be a Star was released on September 9, 2011, by Columbia Pictures. It became a critical and commercial failure. It received six Razzie nominations, including for Worst Picture, but lost to the film Jack and Jill, another film from Happy Madison Productions (which swept that year's Razzies). It is often considered to be one of the worst movies of all time.

== Plot ==
Bucky Larson, a small-town man-child with big buck teeth, works at a local grocery store, and still lives at home. One night while watching porn with his friends, he stumbles upon a family secret: his quiet and reserved parents were famous adult performers in the 1970s. This motivates him to leave northern Iowa for Hollywood, hoping to follow in their footsteps and fulfill his destiny as the biggest adult-film star in the world. However, he has no idea how to become a porn star like his parents, and his penis is incredibly small.

Once he reaches Los Angeles, he meets and falls in love with Kathy, a kindhearted waitress, who introduces him to Gary, the former roommate of John Mayer. After moving with Gary, he pursues his job as a porn actor. Through a series of misadventures he ends up at an industry party, where he is humiliated by narcissistic porn star Dick Shadow. The next day, he meets fading porn director Miles Deep. They make a test film where Bucky prematurely ejaculates, and they consider the endeavor a failure. But after one of the crew uploads the video to YouTube, Bucky achieves popularity as his small penis makes women appreciate their partner's endowment and the men do not feel threatened.

After failing to secure an adult film contract for Bucky, Miles decides to produce films with him independently. They eventually achieve success with their videos, but Bucky chooses Kathy over fame. Before he can tell her how he feels, she rejects him without explanation, leaving him brokenhearted. During a film shoot, Miles confesses that he had told Kathy to leave Bucky so he could have his prize star all to himself.

Bucky forgives Miles and goes after Kathy, who is on a horrible date with Dick Shadow. Bucky declares his love for Kathy, and the two get married. After one year, Bucky opens his own steakhouse. One night, Gary comes into the restaurant and yells at him for owing him rent money, and tells Bucky he is "just like John Mayer".

== Cast ==
- Nick Swardson as Bucky Larson
- Christina Ricci as Kathy McGee
- Edward Herrmann as Jeremiah Larson
- Kevin Nealon as Gary
- Don Johnson as Miles Deep
- Stephen Dorff as Dick Shadow
- Miriam Flynn as Debbie Larson
- Ido Mosseri as J. Day
- Nick Turturro as Antonio
- Curtis Armstrong as Clint
- Mario Joyner as Claudio
- Mary Pat Gleason as Marge
- Brandon Hardesty as Lars
- Adam Herschman as Dale
- Pauly Shore as himself/Award Presenter
- Beverly Polcyn as Mrs. Bozobop
- Jonathan Loughran as Bondage guy
- Peter Dante as Dante
- Pasha Lychnikoff as Dimitri/Distributor
- Jimmy Fallon as himself
- Joey Diaz as The German Guy/Distributor
- Keegan-Michael Key as Guinness Man

== Production ==
Filming began in April of 2009 and wrapped three months later.

== Release ==
Originally slated for release on September 3rd, 2010, the film ended up being delayed to April 22, 2011 before eventually settled on September 9th, 2011.

== Reception ==
=== Critical response ===
The film was not pre-screened for critics, and was widely panned upon release. On the review aggregator website Rotten Tomatoes, 3% of 34 critics' reviews are positive, with an average rating of 2.3/10. The website's consensus reads: "A severely misguided and inept comedy incapable of even telling its single joke properly." Metacritic, which uses a weighted average, assigned the film a score of 9 out of 100, based on 13 critics, indicating "overwhelming dislike". It was the worst-reviewed wide release of 2011. It was also given the Moldy Tomato award for the worst-reviewed film of 2011 by Rotten Tomatoes. Audiences surveyed by CinemaScore gave the film a grade "B" on scale of A to F.

Orlando Sentinel critic Roger Moore stated "the concept, and the movie that comes from it aren't funny. And second, Swardson wasn't any more born to be a star than his character". New York Times critic A.O. Scott stated in his review that Bucky Larson: Born to Be a Star was so bad that it "may have been made ... to console every actor who has ever been in a movie that is a little less bad than this one. Let me put the matter another way: this may be the worst movie Pauly Shore has ever been in. Think about that. If you dare, go on Netflix and test the hypothesis." Critic Nathan Rabin gave the film a D− in his initial review, then noted that "Bucky Larson was panned so viciously that my D− ranked on the generous side of critical appraisals" when revisiting the film a second time for his My Year of Flops column, where he cited it as an example of a "shitty miracle, [a film where] everything goes awry. It's not a matter of one sorry element dragging the rest down; it's every terrible component amplifying the awfulness of everything else", later calling it "one of the ugliest, most misguided comedies in recent memory."

=== Accolades ===
The film earned six nominations at the 32nd Golden Raspberry Awards including Worst Picture, Worst Actor (Nick Swardson), Worst Director, Worst Screenplay, Worst Screen Ensemble, and Worst Prequel, Remake, Rip-off or Sequel (rip-off of Boogie Nights and A Star Is Born). It lost in all six categories to Jack and Jill, another poorly received film in which Adam Sandler and Nick Swardson had involvement.

=== Box office ===
Bucky Larson was a box office flop, earning only $1.4 million to land at #15 for its opening weekend, thus making Bucky Larson the least successful Happy Madison film to date, both critically and commercially. After two weeks of release, the film had earned a total of $2.5 million, after which it was pulled from theatres.

The film's budget was under $10 million.

=== Response from Swardson ===
Swardson defended Bucky Larson in an October 2011 interview, in which he blamed its poor financial showing on the difficulties of advertising the material: "To promote an R-rated movie, with commercials, with this character, it was just really, really hard. It was hard to get the movie across to people. The trailer in theaters was really tame because we couldn't show any of the insanity, and even if we did it, it wouldn't hit because it had no context. It was just really frustrating." He predicted the film would find more appreciation on DVD.

In the same interview, Swardson dismissed the negative reviews. "I knew the critics were going to bury us because of the acting, how it was written and directed ... None of those reviewers was psyched to see Bucky Larson and laugh. They go in with the mentality 'fuck these guys for making another movie.' They go in there to kind of headhunt. It makes me laugh because it's just so embarrassing. It makes them look like such morons."

== See also ==
- List of 21st century films considered the worst
