= Anger Management (film) =

- Theatrical release poster
- Directed by: Peter Segal
- Written by: David S. Dorfman
- Produced by: Jack Giarraputo; Barry Bernandi
- Starring: Adam Sandler; Jack Nicholson; Marisa Tomei; Luis Guzmán; Woody Harrelson; John Turturro
- Cinematography: Donald McAlpine
- Edited by: Jeff Gourson
- Music by: Teddy Castellucci
- Production companies: Columbia Pictures; Revolution Studios; Happy Madison Productions
- Distributed by: Sony Pictures Releasing
- Release date: April 11, 2003
- Running time: 106 minutes
- Country: United States
- Language: English
- Budget: $75 million
- Box office: $195.7 million

Anger Management is a 2003 American comedy film directed by Peter Segal and written by David S. Dorfman. It stars Adam Sandler and Jack Nicholson with Marisa Tomei, Luis Guzmán, Woody Harrelson and John Turturro in supporting roles. This is the last film role of Lynne Thigpen, who died on March 12, 2003, and the film is dedicated to her memory.

The film tells the story of a businessman who is sentenced to an anger management program under a renowned therapist with unconventional methods.

Produced by Columbia Pictures, Revolution Studios, and Happy Madison Productions, it was released in theaters in the United States on April 11, 2003, by Sony Pictures Releasing. The film received mixed reviews from critics and it grossed a total box office of $195.7 million against a total budget of $75 million.

== Plot ==
In 1978 Brooklyn, Dave Buznik is humiliated when local bully Arnie Shankman interrupts his first kiss by pantsing him. Twenty-five years later, the mild-mannered Dave works as a secretary for a mean-spirited boss named Frank while dating Linda. His lingering trauma leaves him unable to show affection publicly, a problem exacerbated by his arrogant co-worker Andrew, who is close to Linda and hopes to rekindle their past romance.

During a flight, Dave's frustration with a flight attendant is misinterpreted as rage. The sky marshal tasers him, and he is sentenced to anger management under therapist Dr. Buddy Rydell, who happened to sit next to him on the plane. However, Dave finds himself surrounded by far more volatile clients in a group therapy session.

Dave's sentence is extended after he accidentally injures a waitress while defending himself during a bar fight. Dave faces a prison sentence, but Buddy proposes continuous live-in therapy as a "radical" alternative. Buddy moves into Dave's apartment and accompanies him everywhere, deploying unorthodox techniques that push Dave toward passive-aggressive behavior.

Buddy becomes infatuated with Linda after seeing her photo and arranges situations that test Dave's boundaries, including a forced performance of "I Feel Pretty" in traffic and an encounter with a cross-dressing prostitute. After Dave fabricates a medical emergency involving Buddy's mother, Buddy retaliates by arranging for Dave to be seduced by a former patient. Buddy also engineers a reunion with the adult Arnie, now a Buddhist monk. After Arnie laughs when reminded of the pantsing incident, Dave and Buddy provoke a physical fight that finally allows Dave a measure of revenge.

Linda, following Buddy's advice, announces a trial separation so Dave can focus on improving his attitude. When Dave discovers Buddy is dating her, he attacks him and is hit with a restraining order. At the office, upon learning that Andrew has been promoted into the position he had expected, Dave punches Andrew and trashes Frank's office.

Learning from Andrew that Buddy has taken Linda to a New York Yankees game, Dave assumes Buddy intends to propose to her, so races to the stadium. Making his way onto the field, he publicly declares his willingness to change, kisses Linda in front of the crowd, and proposes. Linda accepts, then reveals the ordeal to have been an elaborate set-up.

Linda collaborated with Buddy after reading his book, and most of the people involved, including the security guards and New York Mayor Rudy Giuliani (who intervened for Dave), were participants in Buddy's plan to force Dave to confront his fear and assert himself. At a barbecue celebrating Dave's "graduation", a final threat from an armed man whose car Buddy had earlier destroyed turns out to be Dave's own prank, and the group sings "I Feel Pretty".

== Cast ==
- Adam Sandler as Dave Buznik
  - Jonathan Osser as Young Dave Buznik
- Jack Nicholson as Dr. Buddy Rydell
- Marisa Tomei as Linda
- Luis Guzmán as Lou
- Allen Covert as Andrew
- Lynne Thigpen as Judge Brenda Daniels
- Woody Harrelson as Galaxia the prostitute and Gary the Security Guard
- John Turturro as Chuck
- Kurt Fuller as Frank Head
- Jonathan Loughran as Nate
- Krista Allen as Stacy
- January Jones as Gina
- Clint Black as Masseur
- Kevin Nealon as Sam and Dave's Lawyer
- Nancy Carell as Patty the Flight Attendant
- John C. Reilly (uncredited) as Older Arnie Shankman
  - Alan James Morgan as Young Arnie Shankman
- Heather Graham (uncredited) as Kendra
- Harry Dean Stanton (uncredited) as the Blind Man
- Isaac C. Singleton Jr. as Air Marshal
- Stephen Dunham as Maitre d'
- Cody Arens as the Boy at Yankee Stadium
- John McEnroe as Himself
- Derek Jeter as Himself
- Robert Merrill as Himself
- Bob Sheppard as Himself
- Judith Nathan as Himself
- Bob Knight as Himself
- Roger Clemens as Himself
- Rudy Giuliani as Himself

== Reception ==
=== Box office ===
Anger Management was number one at the box office on its opening weekend, April 11–13, 2003, earning $42.2 million. The film surpassed Big Daddy (1999) and Batman (1989) to have the highest opening weekend for both an Adam Sandler film and a Jack Nicholson film. It also had the highest April opening weekend, beating out The Scorpion King (2002). It earned a total of $135.6 million in the U.S. with a total worldwide box office of $195.7 million.

=== Critical response ===
On Rotten Tomatoes, Anger Management has a 42% approval rating based on 191 reviews, with an average score of 5.1/10 and a consensus: "Though not without its funny moments, Anger Management is ultimately stale and disappointingly one-note, especially considering its capable cast." On Metacritic, the film has a weighted average score of 52 out of 100 based on 39 critics, indicating "mixed or average" reviews. Audiences surveyed by CinemaScore gave the film an average grade of "C+" on an A+ to F scale.

Roger Ebert for the Chicago Sun-Times wrote: "The concept is inspired. The execution is lame. Anger Management, a film that might have been one of Adam Sandler's best, becomes one of Jack Nicholson's worst." Caroline Westbrook for Empire magazine thought "A better script and more attention to other cast members would have helped but, as it stands, this is still the best Adam Sandler comedy since The Wedding Singer." William Arnold of the Seattle Post-Intelligencer gave the film a D, describing it as "a perfectly dreadful affair that makes no sense, has almost no good laughs and finally just sinks like a rock in a Beverly Hills swimming pool."

=== Accolades ===
Year	Ceremony	Category	Recipients	Result
2003	Teen Choice Awards	Choice Movie: Comedy		Nominated
2003	Teen Choice Awards	Choice Movie Actor: Comedy	Adam Sandler	Nominated
2003	Teen Choice Awards	Choice Hissy Fit	Adam Sandler	Won
2003	Teen Choice Awards	Choice Hissy Fit	Jack Nicholson	Nominated
2004	MTV Movie Awards	Best Cameo	John McEnroe	Nominated

== TV series adaptation ==
A television series based loosely on the film premiered on June 28, 2012, starring Charlie Sheen in the role originated by Jack Nicholson, though not sharing the same name. The series was Sheen's first acting role since his firing from the hit CBS sitcom Two and a Half Men on March 7, 2011, after eight seasons. The show was produced by the film's producer Joe Roth, and was broadcast on FX in the United States, CTV in Canada and on TBS in Latin America for two seasons, totalling 100 episodes before it was cancelled.
