= I Now Pronounce You Chuck & Larry =

2007 film by Dennis Dugan

- Theatrical release poster
- Directed by: Dennis Dugan
- Screenplay by: Barry Fanaro; Alexander Payne; Jim Taylor
- Based on: A treatment by Lew Gallo
- Produced by: Adam Sandler; Jack Giarraputo; Tom Shadyac; Michael Bostick
- Starring: Adam Sandler; Kevin James; Jessica Biel; Ving Rhames; Steve Buscemi; Dan Aykroyd
- Cinematography: Dean Semler
- Edited by: Jeff Gourson
- Music by: Rupert Gregson-Williams
- Production companies: Relativity Media; Shady Acres Entertainment; Happy Madison Productions
- Distributed by: Universal Pictures
- Release dates: July 12, 2007 (Universal City); July 20, 2007 (United States)
- Running time: 115 minutes
- Country: United States
- Language: English
- Budget: $85 million
- Box office: $187 million

I Now Pronounce You Chuck & Larry (also simply known as Chuck & Larry) is a 2007 American buddy comedy film directed by Dennis Dugan from a screenplay by Barry Fanaro, Alexander Payne, and Jim Taylor. It stars Adam Sandler and Kevin James as the title characters Chuck Levine and Larry Valentine, respectively, two New York City firefighters who run into various problems after they pretend to be a homosexual couple in order to ensure that Larry, a widowed father, can provide life insurance for his two children. Jessica Biel, Ving Rhames, Steve Buscemi and Dan Aykroyd appear in supporting roles, with Jamie Chung making her film debut in a minor role.

I Now Pronounce You Chuck & Larry released in the United States on July 20, 2007, as Sandler's first role in a Universal Pictures film since Bulletproof in 1996. It grossed $187 million against an $85 million budget, but received generally negative reviews from critics.

== Plot ==
FDNY veterans Chuck Levine, a womanizing bachelor, and Larry Valentine, a widower father, are the pride of their Brooklyn firehouse, Engine 506/Ladder 223. During a sweep of a burned building, a segment of floor collapses on Chuck. After Larry rescues him, Chuck vows to repay him. Experiencing an epiphany from the incident, Larry tries to increase his life insurance policy but discovers that a paperwork lapse after his wife Paula's death one year earlier prevents him from naming his children, Eric and Tori, as primary beneficiaries. The insurance company representative suggests that Larry find a new spouse that he can name as his beneficiary.

Inspired by a newspaper article about domestic partnerships, Larry asks Chuck to enter a civil union with him. Chuck is reminded of his debt to Larry and agrees, entering a domestic partnership and becoming Larry's primary beneficiary. However, investigators inquire about their abrupt partnership, suspecting fraud, so the duo enlists the help of lawyer Alex McDonough, who suggests they have a formal wedding ceremony to prove their commitment. The pair travel to Niagara Falls, Ontario, Canada for a quick same-sex marriage at a wedding chapel, and Chuck moves in with Larry and his children.

Alex invites the couple to a gay benefit costume party. At the end of the evening, homophobic protesters confront the partygoers. Chuck is provoked into punching their leader, and the local news picks up the incident. With their apparent homosexuality and marriage revealed, Chuck and Larry are heckled, their fellow FDNY firefighters abandon them, and their captain, Phineas J. Tucker, aware of the truth, refuses to protect them. Their only ally is Fred G. Duncan, an angry firefighter who surprises Chuck by admitting he has not felt comfortable disclosing his homosexuality.

Chuck becomes romantically interested in Alex after the two spend time together but finds himself unable to get close to her because she thinks he is gay. During an intimate talk about relationships, the two spontaneously kiss, but Alex, still believing Chuck is gay and married, is shocked and distances herself from Chuck. Meanwhile, city agent Clinton Fitzer investigates the couple, and the strain on Larry and Chuck results in a verbal fight. Larry asserts that Chuck's constant absence to spend time with Alex is jeopardizing their ability to maintain the ruse of their relationship, and Chuck responds by instructing Larry to move on from Paula's death. Later that evening, a petition circulates to have Chuck and Larry thrown out of the firehouse. Larry confronts the crew about personal embarrassments on the job that Chuck and Larry helped them overcome. Afterward, Chuck and Larry reconcile with each other.

Eventually, numerous women publicly testify to having recently slept with Chuck, and the couple is called into court to defend their marriage against charges of fraud, with Alex as their attorney. Their fellow firefighters arrive in support, having realized all that the pair have done for them. Fitzer interrogates both men and demands they kiss to prove that their relationship is physical. Before they do so, Captain Tucker exposes their marriage as a sham and both men as straight. He then offers to be arrested as well, since he knew about the false relationship but failed to report it, which prompts the other firefighters to show solidarity by claiming a role in the wedding. The firefighters are released from jail after negotiating a deal to provide photos for an AIDS research benefit calendar, provided that Chuck and Larry plead guilty to fraud, which would reduce the charges to a misdemeanor and allow them to keep their benefits.

Two months later, Fred and Alex's brother, Kevin, marries in Niagara Falls at the same chapel as Chuck and Larry. At the wedding party (which features musical guest Lance Bass), Larry moves on from Paula's death and talks to a new woman, while Alex agrees to a dance with Chuck.

== Cast ==
- Adam Sandler as Chuck Levine, a veteran member of the New York City Fire Department
- Kevin James as Larry Valentine, a member of the New York City Fire Department who pretends to be Chuck's husband
- Jessica Biel as Alex McDonough, a lawyer who helps Chuck and Larry
- Ving Rhames as Fred G. Duncan, a member of the New York City Fire Department
- Nick Swardson as Kevin McDonough, Alex's older brother and Fred's husband
- Steve Buscemi as Clinton Fitzer
- Dan Aykroyd as Captain Phineas J. Tucker, the fire captain of the New York City Fire Department
- Nicholas Turturro as Renaldo Pinera
- Richard Chamberlain as Councilman Banks
- Mary Pat Gleason as Teresa, Larry's housekeeper
- Rachel Dratch as Sara Powers
- Matt Winston as Glen Aldrich
- Peter Dante as Anthony "Tony" Paroni
- Cole Morgen as Eric Valentine, Larry's son
- Shelby Adamowsky as Tori Valentine, Larry's daughter
- Allen Covert as Steve
- John Farley as the voice of a criminal
- Lance Bass as Bandleader
- Dave Matthews as a salesman
- Blake Clark as a crazy homeless man
- Dan Patrick as a New York cop
- Chandra West as "Doctor Honey"
- Tila Tequila and Jamie Chung as Hooters girls
- Dennis Dugan as a cab driver
- Rob Corddry as Jim, a minister
- Jonathan Loughran as David Nootzie
- Becky and Jessie O'Donohue as Donna and Darla
- Robert Smigel as Mailman
- Jim Ford (uncredited) as a criminal stuck in chimney
- Michael Marcanio (uncredited) as Child Friend
- Rob Schneider (uncredited) as Morris Takechi
- David Spade (uncredited) as Transvestite groupie
- Arne Starr (uncredited) as a court supporter

== Production ==
Producer Tom Shadyac had planned this film as early as 1999. I Now Pronounce You Joe and Benny, as the film was then titled, was announced as starring Nicolas Cage and Will Smith with Shadyac directing.

In the official trailer, the song "Grace Kelly" by British pop star Mika was included.

== Release ==
=== Critical response ===
Rotten Tomatoes, a review aggregator, reports a 15% approval rating based on 165 reviews, with an average rating of 3.80/10. The site's critical consensus reads, "Whether by way of inept comedy or tasteless stereotypes, I Now Pronounce You Chuck & Larry falters on both levels." On Metacritic, the film has a score of 37 out of 100 based on 33 critics, indicating "generally unfavorable" reviews. Audiences polled by CinemaScore gave the film an average grade of "B+" on an A+ to F scale.

USA Today called it "a movie that gives marriage, homosexuality, friendship, firefighters, children and nearly everything else a bad name." The Wall Street Journal called it "an insult to gays, straights, men, women, children, African-Americans, Asians, pastors, mailmen, insurance adjusters, firemen, doctors -- and fans of show music."

The New York Post called it not an insult to homosexuality but to comedy itself. The Miami Herald was slightly less critical, calling the film "funny in the juvenile, crass way we expect."

Nathan Lee from the Village Voice wrote a positive review, praising the film for being "tremendously savvy in its stupid way" and "as eloquent as Brokeback Mountain, and even more radical." Controversial critic Armond White championed the film as "a modern classic" for its "ultimate moral lesson—that sexuality has absolutely nothing to do with who Chuck and Larry are as people".

=== Box office ===
I Now Pronounce You Chuck & Larry grossed $34,233,750 and ranked #1 at the domestic box office in its opening weekend, higher than the other opening wide release that weekend, Hairspray, and the previous weekend's #1 film, Harry Potter and the Order of the Phoenix. By the end of its run, the film had grossed $120,059,556 domestically and $66,012,658 internationally for a worldwide total of $186,072,214.

=== Social responses and controversy ===
The film was screened before release for GLAAD. GLAAD representative Damon Romine told Entertainment Weekly magazine: "The movie has some of the expected stereotypes, but in its own disarming way, it's a call for equality and respect".

According to Alexander Payne, the writer of an initial draft of the film, Sandler took many liberties with his screenplay, "Sandler-izing" the film, in his own words. He did not want his name attached to the project at some point.

A review from AfterElton criticized the character played by Rob Schneider for using yellowface, comparing the performance to Mickey Rooney's infamous role as I. Y. Yunioshi in Breakfast at Tiffany's. However, Schneider is 25% Filipino.

In November 2007, the producers of the Australian film Strange Bedfellows initiated legal action against Universal Studios, Inc. for copyright violation. Strange Bedfellows was released three years before. In comparison, the films have 100 similar plot points. Both movie plots deal with two firemen, who pretend to be a gay couple for financial reasons, are investigated, and then have to deal with the situation with their friends and community. The suit was withdrawn in April 2008 after the producers of Strange Bedfellows received an early draft of Chuck & Larry that predated their film, and they were satisfied that they had not been plagiarized.

In January 2020, a member of Chicago's city council cited the film during an argument over a city plan to set aside contracts for gay- and transgender-owned businesses. Alderman Walter Burnett said, "I think about that movie about the two firemen where they were faking like they were gay… to get benefits. That's a concern of mine. How do you distinguish that?"

=== Home media ===
I Now Pronounce You Chuck & Larry was released on DVD and Blu-ray on November 6, 2007, by Universal Studios Home Entertainment.

== Accolades ==
The film received eight Golden Raspberry Award nominations including Worst Picture, Worst Actor (Adam Sandler), Worst Supporting Actor (both Kevin James and Rob Schneider), Worst Supporting Actress (Jessica Biel), Worst Director (Dennis Dugan), Worst Screenplay and Worst Screen Couple (Adam Sandler with either Kevin James or Jessica Biel), but did not win any.

== See also ==
- Boston marriage
- Mariage blanc
- Marriage of convenience
- Non-sexual same-sex marriage
- Sham marriage
