= Blake Clark =

American stand-up comedian and actor

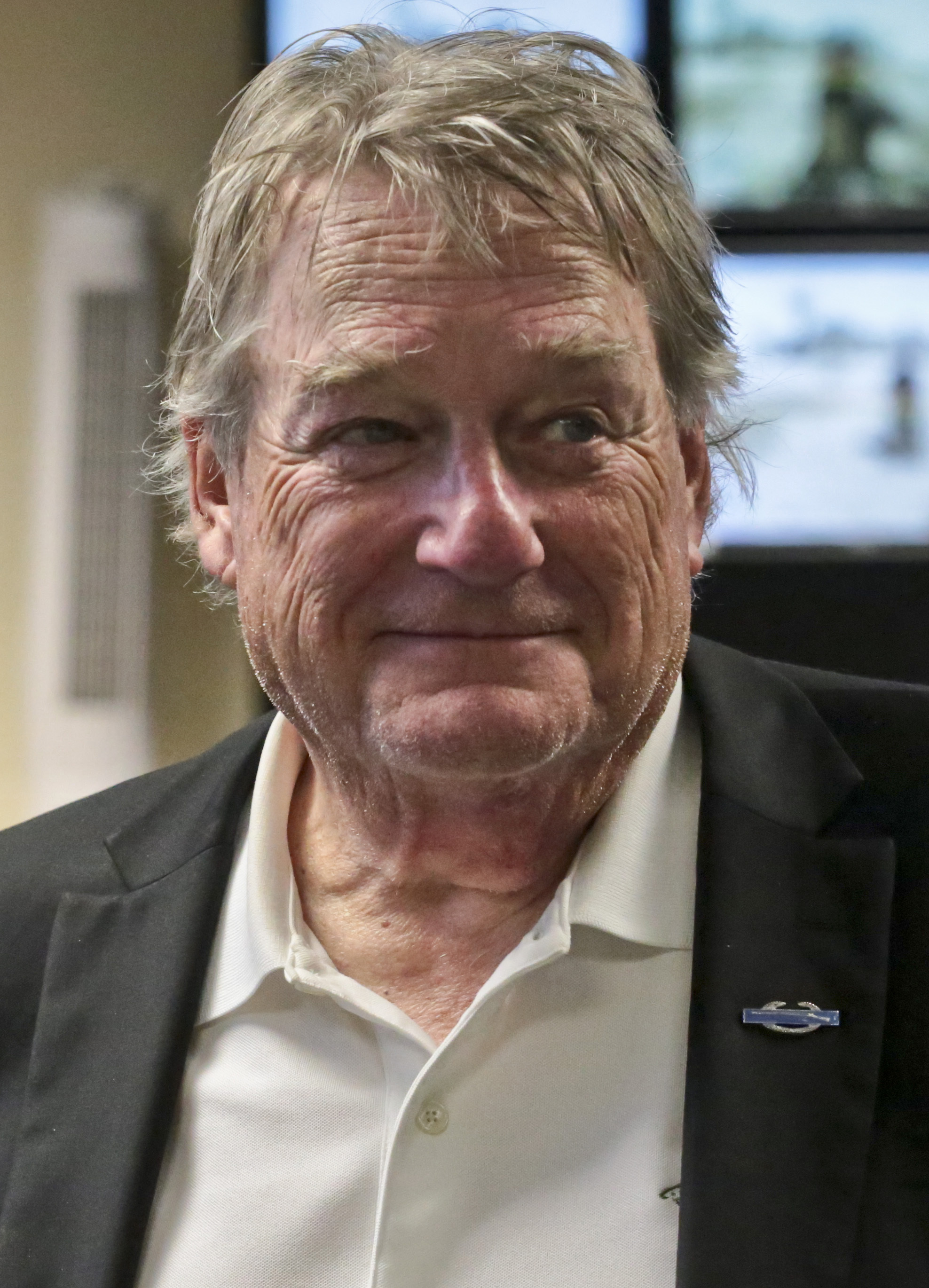
- Clark in 2016
- Born: Macon, Georgia, U.S.
- Occupations: Stand-up comedian; actor
- Children: 2

Comedy career
- Years active: 1980–present
- Medium: Stand-up; film; television; radio
- Genre: Observational comedy

Blake Clark is an American stand-up comedian and actor. He is best known as Chet Hunter on Boy Meets World, Harry Turner on Home Improvement, as well as his frequent collaborations with Adam Sandler. Clark has voiced Slinky Dog in the Toy Story franchise starting with 2008's Toy Story: The Musical, having inherited the role from his friend Jim Varney, who died of lung cancer in 2000.

== Early life ==
Blake Clark was born and raised in Macon, Georgia. He is a veteran of the Vietnam War, having served as a first lieutenant in the United States Army with the 5th Infantry Division.

Following his military service he had a number of jobs including working as a football coach and a high school history teacher.

== Career ==
In 1980, Clark moved to Los Angeles to break into show business and comedy.

In 1984, Clark co-starred in the George Carlin HBO TV show Apt. 2C of which only the pilot episode was ever made.

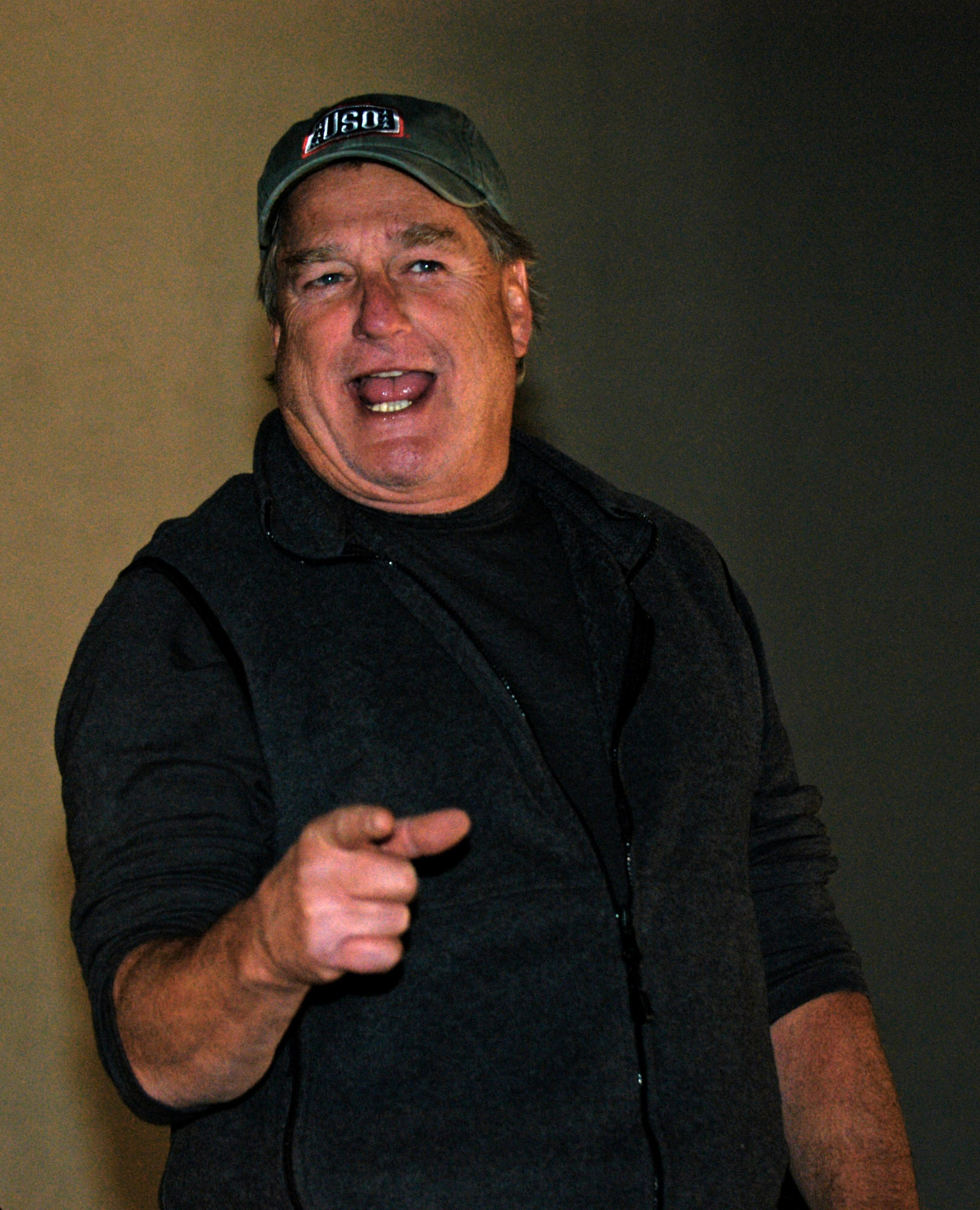
Clark performing for troops at Base Theater during Holiday Handshake Tour in Iraq on December 14, 2004

Clark has been cast in numerous Adam Sandler films including The Waterboy, Little Nicky, Mr. Deeds, Eight Crazy Nights, 50 First Dates, I Now Pronounce You Chuck & Larry, Bedtime Stories, Grown Ups, and That's My Boy. He has also made guest appearances in numerous television series, including Home Improvement, Boy Meets World, The Jamie Foxx Show, The Drew Carey Show, Girl Meets World, and Community. He was also Fred the chauffeur in Remington Steele. Starting with Toy Story 3, Clark has voiced Slinky Dog in the Toy Story franchise, in place of his close friend Jim Varney, Slinky's original voice actor in the first two films, who died of lung cancer on February 10, 2000.

When Toy Story 3 was still in production after Varney had died, Pixar searched for someone who sounded like Varney and found Clark, who "very much captures the essence and spirit of Slinky Dog's character." Clark has since reprised the role in the video game tie-in, Kinect Rush: A Disney-Pixar Adventure, Disney Infinity, Toy Story 4 and Toy Story 5.

== Filmography ==
Key
†	Denotes films that have not yet been released

=== Film ===
Table featuring feature films with Blake Clark
Year	Title	Role	Notes
1985	St. Elmo's Fire	Wally	Film debut role
1989	Fast Food	E.G. McCormick	
1989	Wired	Dusty Jenkins	
1989	Johnny Handsome	Sheriff Monte	
1991	Shakes the Clown	Stenchy the Clown	
1991	The Dark Wind	Ben Gaines	
1992	Ladybugs	Coach Bull	
1992	Love Potion No. 9	Motorcycle Cop	
1992	Toys	Hagenstern	
1993	Fatal Instinct	Milo Crumley	
1994	The Mask	Murray	
1996	Alone in the Woods	Sarge	
1997	Nothing to Lose	Gas Station Cashier	Uncredited
1998	The Waterboy	Farmer Fran	
1998	Tycus	Commander Scott	
1999	Valerie Flake	Uncle Jack	
2000	Critical Mass	Sheriff Borden	
2000	Intrepid	Wayne	
2000	Bread and Roses	Mr. Griffin	
2000	Little Nicky	Jimmy the Demon	
2000	Donut Men	Mr. Cellphone	
2001	Joe Dirt	Farmer Fran	Cameo appearance
2001	Corky Romano	Security Guard	
2002	Back by Midnight	Farmer	
2002	Mr. Deeds	Buddy Ward	
2002	Eight Crazy Nights	Radio Shack Walkie-Talkie	Voice role
2003	BachelorMan	Veteran Sportscaster	
2003	Intolerable Cruelty	Convention Secretary	
2004	50 First Dates	Marlin Whitmore	
2004	The Ladykillers	Football Coach	
2006	The Benchwarmers	Umpire	
2006	I'm Reed Fish	Irv	
2006	Car Babes	Big Len Davis	
2006	Click	Roy	Uncredited
2007	I Now Pronounce You Chuck & Larry	Crazy Homeless Man	
2008	Strange Wilderness	Dick	
2008	Leatherheads	Chicago Referee	
2008	Wieners	Mr. Applebaum	
2008	Get Smart	General	
2008	Bedtime Stories	Biker	
2009	American Cowslip	Grimes	
2010	The Last Godfather	Captain O'Brian	Korean film
2010	Toy Story 3	Slinky Dog	Voice role
2010	Grown Ups	Bobby "Buzzer" Ferdinando	
2011	Rango	Buford	Voice role
2011	Son of Mourning	Olde Fisherman	
2011	Hawaiian Vacation	Slinky Dog	Voice role Short film
2012	That's My Boy	Gerald Martin	
2013	Highland Park	Hal	
2015	The Ridiculous 6	Gulch Sheriff	
2019	Toy Story 4	Slinky Dog	Voice role
2019	Between Two Ferns: The Movie	Earl Canderton	
2020	Hubie Halloween	Tayback the Cook	
2023	Leo	Golfer #1	Voice role
2025	Happy Gilmore 2	Beach Man	
2026	Toy Story 5	Slinky Dog	Voice role

=== Television ===
Table featuring feature television with Blake Clark
Year	Title	Role	Notes
1981	The Greatest American Hero	Sergeant / Policeman	2 episodes
1982	Tucker's Witch	Sturges	Episode: "The Corpse Who Knew Too Much"
1982–1989	Remington Steele	Fred	6 episodes
1983	M*A*S*H	2nd M.P.	Episode: "Goodbye, Farewell and Amen"
1984	Hot Flashes	Al	5 episodes
1985	Apt. 2C	Toki	Television film
1985	Moonlighting	Newsstand Man	Episode: "Moonlighting (Pilot)"
1985–1986	Newhart	Roby	2 episodes
1986	Long Time Gone	Bartender	Television film
1986	The Facts of Life	Truck Driver	Season 8 Episode 9 Fast Food
1987	Gimme a Break!	B.J. O'Brien	2 episodes
1987–1988	Women in Prison	Assistant Warden Clint Rafferty	13 episodes
1987–1988	It's Garry Shandling's Show	Blake Cumbers / Flashback Booth Repairman / Capt. Gordon	3 episodes
1991	Midnight Caller	Nelson Briles	3 episodes
1991	Who's the Boss?	Hoyt	Episode: "Misery"
1991	Designing Women	Skip Jackson	Episode: "Just Say Doe"
1992	Grave Secrets: The Legacy of Hilltop Drive	W.D. Marshall	Television film
1993	Roseanne	Vic	Episode: "Lose a Job, Winnebago"
1993–1994	Grace Under Fire	Gil Kelly / Jimmy	3 episodes
1994	Comedy: Coast to Coast	Himself	
1994	Thea	Roy Bennett	2 episodes
1994	Tales from the Crypt	Jerry	Episode: "Whirlpool"
1994–1999	Home Improvement	Harry	22 episodes
1995	The Drew Carey Show	Jules Lambermont	5 episodes
1995–2000	Boy Meets World	Chet Hunter	12 episodes
1996	Coach	Buffalo Billy	Episode: "Wings Over Buffalo"
1996	Unsolved Mysteries	Himself	Episode: "#8.17"
1997	Murphy Brown	Secret Service Agent	Episode: "Murphy Redux"
1998	Arliss	Mr. Griff	Episode: "What Would I Do Without Wu?"
1998	Smart Guy	Mr. Petrasek	Episode: "Boomerang"
1999–2000	The Jamie Foxx Show	Bob Nelson / Bob	11 episodes
2000–2002	The New Woody Woodpecker Show	Sgt. Hogwash	Voice role 8 episodes
2001	Sabrina the Teenage Witch	Phil the Dog	Voice role 2 episodes
2003	Lucky	—N/a	Episode: "Come Lie with Me"
2003	Lost at Home	Ralphie / Hot Dog Vendor	2 episodes
2004	Cold Case	Tom Jaden	Episode: "The House"
2005	Todd's Coma	Trina's Father	Televisión film
2005	My Name Is Earl	Buzz Darville	Episode: "White Lie Christmas"
2006	Everybody Hates Chris	Russo	Episode: "Everybody Hates Jail"
2010	Good Luck Charlie	Mel	Episode: "Take Mel Out to the Ball Game"
2010	Community	Coach Herbert Bogner	Episode: "Physical Education"
2011–2012	Fish Hooks	Chief	Voice role 6 episodes
2014	Wander Over Yonder	Additional voices	
2015	Girl Meets World	Chet Hunter	Episode: "Girl Meets Hurricane"
2016	Last Man Standing	Clark	Episode: "Eve's Band"
2016–2017	Harvey Beaks	Roland	Voice role 3 episodes
2017–2019	SMILF	Joe	10 episodes
2021–2022	United States of Al	Wayne	7 episodes
2021	Hacks	Tunnel of Love Proprietor	Episode: "Tunnel of Love"
2025	Leanne	Daddy John	main role, 14 episodes

=== Video games ===
Table featuring feature video game with Blake Clark
Year	Title	Role	Notes
2010	Toy Story 3: The Video Game	Slinky Dog	Voice role
2011	Rango	Buford	Voice role
2012	Kinect Rush: A Disney-Pixar Adventure	Slinky Dog	Voice role
2013	Disney Infinity	Slinky Dog	Voice role

=== Theme parks ===
Table featuring feature theme park with Blake Clark
Year	Title	Role	Notes
2018	Slinky Dog Dash	Slinky Dog	Voice role

== Theatre ==
Table featuring feature theatre with Blake Clark
Year	Title	Role	Notes
2008	Toy Story: The Musical	Slinky Dog	Voice role
