= Jeff Gourson =

American film editor and producer (born 1946)

- Born: January 30, 1946 (age 80); Los Angeles, California, U.S.
- Occupations: TV/film director and producer
- Years active: 1969–present
- Spouses: Joy Harmon (m. 1968; div. 2001); Stacey Gourson (m. 2005)
- Children: 3

Jeff Gourson (born January 30, 1946) is an American film editor and producer. He has been jointly nominated three times for an Emmy Award for his production work on the television series Quantum Leap.

== Film editing work ==
Jeff Gourson began his career as an editor. Based on Gourson's filmography at the Internet Database, the director and release date of each film are indicated in parentheses.

With more than 30 film credits dating from 1977, his film editing work includes:

Editor
| Year | Film | Director | Notes |
|---|---|---|---|
| 1977 | September 30, 1955 | James Bridges | First collaboration with James Bridges |
| 1978 | FM | John A. Alonzo | |
| 1980 | Somewhere in Time | Jeannot Szwarc | |
| 1981 | The Incredible Shrinking Woman | Joel Schumacher | |
| 1982 | Tron | Steven Lisberger | |
| 1984 | Mike's Murder | James Bridges | Second collaboration with James Bridges |
| 1985 | Perfect | James Bridges | Third collaboration with James Bridges |
| 1986 | Flight of the Navigator | Randal Kleiser | First collaboration with Randal Kleiser |
| 1987 | Can't Buy Me Love | Steve Rash | |
| 1988 | Big Top Pee-wee | Randal Kleiser | Second collaboration with Randal Kleiser |
| 1996 | Happy Gilmore | Dennis Dugan | First collaboration with Dennis Dugan |
| 1997 | Beverly Hills Ninja | Dennis Dugan | Second collaboration with Dennis Dugan |
| 1998 | Shadow of Doubt | Randal Kleiser | Fourth collaboration with Randal Kleiser |
| 1999 | Big Daddy | Dennis Dugan | Third collaboration with Dennis Dugan |
| 2000 | Little Nicky | Steven Brill | First collaboration with Steven Brill |
| 2001 | The Animal | Luke Greenfield | |
| 2002 | Mr. Deeds | Steven Brill | Second collaboration with Steven Brill |
| 2003 | Anger Management | Peter Segal | First collaboration with Peter Segal |
| 2004 | 50 First Dates | Peter Segal | Second collaboration with Peter Segal |
| 2004 | White Chicks | Keenen Ivory Wayans | |
| 2005 | The Longest Yard | Peter Segal | Third collaboration with Peter Segal |
| 2006 | Click | Frank Coraci | |
| 2007 | I Now Pronounce You Chuck & Larry | Dennis Dugan | Fourth collaboration with Dennis Dugan |

Editorial department
| Year | Film | Director | Role | Notes |
|---|---|---|---|---|
| 1969 | Topaz | Alfred Hitchcock | Assistant film editor | Uncredited |
| 1973 | High Plains Drifter | Clint Eastwood | Assistant film editor | Uncredited |
| 1974 | The Sugarland Express | Steven Spielberg | Assistant film editor | Uncredited |
| 1975 | Jaws | Steven Spielberg | Assistant film editor | Uncredited |

Producer
| Year | Film | Director | Credit | Notes |
|---|---|---|---|---|
| 1989 | Getting It Right | Randal Kleiser | Associate producer | Third collaboration with Randal Kleiser |

Production manager
| Year | Film | Director | Role |
|---|---|---|---|
| 1995 | Things to Do in Denver When You're Dead | Gary Fleder | Post-production supervisor |

Second unit director or assistant director
| Year | Film | Director | Role |
|---|---|---|---|
| 2001 | The Animal | Luke Greenfield | Second unit director |

Thanks
| Year | Film | Director | Role |
|---|---|---|---|
| 2009 | Wild Cherry | Dana Lustig | Special thanks |

TV movies

Editor
| Year | Film | Director |
|---|---|---|
| 1994 | The Shaggy Dog | Dennis Dugan |
| 1995 | The Computer Wore Tennis Shoes | Peyton Reed |
| 1998 | Mr. Headmistress | James Frawley |
| 2000 | Mail to the Chief | Eric Champnella |
| 2012 | Prodigy Bully | Peter Segal |

TV series

Editor
| Year | Title | Notes |
|---|---|---|
| 1979 | Studs Lonigan | 3 episodes |
| 1982−83 | Magnum, P.I. | 3 episodes |
| 1984 | Airwolf | 2 episodes |
| 1994 | Burke's Law | 1 episode |
| 1998 | Love Boat: The Next Wave | 1 episode |

Additional crew
| Year | Title | Role | Notes |
|---|---|---|---|
| 2015 | Real Rob | Creative consultant | 8 episodes |

Director
| Year | Title | Notes |
|---|---|---|
| 1992 | Tequila and Bonetti | 1 episode |

Producer
| Year | Title | Credit | Notes |
|---|---|---|---|
| 1989−92 | Quantum Leap | Associate producer Co-producer Producer | 70 episodes |
| 1992 | Tequila and Bonetti | Producer | 11 episodes |
