= The Benchwarmers =

- Theatrical release poster
- Directed by: Dennis Dugan
- Written by: Allen Covert; Nick Swardson
- Produced by: Adam Sandler; Jack Giarraputo
- Starring: Rob Schneider; David Spade; Jon Heder; Nick Swardson; Jon Lovitz; Craig Kilborn; Molly Sims; Tim Meadows
- Cinematography: Thomas E. Ackerman
- Edited by: Peck Prior; Sandy Solowitz
- Music by: Waddy Wachtel
- Production companies: Columbia Pictures; Revolution Studios; Happy Madison Productions
- Distributed by: Sony Pictures Releasing
- Release date: April 7, 2006
- Running time: 85 minutes
- Country: United States
- Language: English
- Budget: $33 million
- Box office: $65 million

The Benchwarmers is a 2006 American sports-comedy film directed by Dennis Dugan, written by Allen Covert and Nick Swardson, and produced by Adam Sandler and Jack Giarraputo. The film stars Rob Schneider, David Spade, Jon Heder, Jon Lovitz, Craig Kilborn, Molly Sims, and Tim Meadows, with Swardson, Erinn Bartlett, Amaury Nolasco, Bill Romanowski, Sean Salisbury, Matt Weinberg, John Farley, Reggie Jackson, and Joe Gnoffo in supporting roles. It tells the story of three nerds and a billionaire forming a titular baseball team to take on Little League teams.

Produced by Sandler's production company Happy Madison Productions in association with Revolution Studios, The Benchwarmers was released in the United States on April 7, 2006, by Columbia Pictures. The film received negative reviews from critics, but has since received a cult status.

A direct-to-video sequel titled Benchwarmers 2: Breaking Balls was released in January 2019.

== Plot ==
Gus Matthews, Richie Goodman, and Clark Reedy are adult "nerds" who spent their childhoods wishing to play baseball, but never got the chance. One day, Gus and Clark witness overweight, timid Nelson Carmichael and his friends being bullied and kicked off a baseball diamond by a local little league team led by Troy and Kyle, so they chase them away. When Gus and Clark go with Richie to the field to play a game, the bullies return, demanding they leave, but Gus challenges them to play for the field. Despite Richie and Clark's terrible ballplaying, the trio win the game due to Gus' surprising capability. The trio are soon befriended by Nelson's billionaire father Mel, during an altercation with Richie and Clark's childhood bully/Troy's uncle Jerry, and Gus defends them. Later, Brad, another childhood bully, challenges them to another game, and the trio wins again.

Later, Mel feels inspired to hold a statewide little league round-robin, including their team, where the winners will get access to a new multimillion-dollar baseball park built by Mel, and the trio join the tournament as the 'Benchwarmers'. As the tournament advances, the Benchwarmers win every game, with Clark and Richie gradually improving, and the team becomes popular among many nerds, athletically challenged children, and the general public, while Jerry and his fellow little league coaches Brad, Karl, and Wayne conspire together to defeat the Benchwarmers. Richie's brother Howie, who has agoraphobia and has not left home for months, eventually joins the team, while Gus' baby-obsessed wife Liz becomes annoyed that Gus keeps putting off her ovulating schedule.

At the semi-final, the desperate competing team's coach Wayne inserts 30-year-old Dominican ringer Carlos, a professional baseball player. Despite Carlos clearly being an adult and having a falsified birth certificate written in crayon, Wayne bribes the home plate umpire to successfully get Carlos onto his team. The impact is immediate as Carlos's superb pitching and hitting get Wayne's team back in the game. However, the Benchwarmers, quickly seeing Carlos being a recovering alcoholic, give him copious amounts of alcohol. Gus manages to tie the game, and then Carlos stomps on his wrist, making pitching difficult. After a bunt from Gus, the Benchwarmers load the bases for the first time, leading to Howie's first at-bat being the only Benchwarmer on-deck. Howie is hit by a pitch due to Carlos' intoxication, which drives in the game-winning run for the Benchwarmers.

After their victory, Brad and Karl discover evidence from fellow poker player Steven that Gus was a bully himself as a child, known for using name calling instead of physical intimidation, and had severely bullied one boy named Marcus so much that he was institutionalised. Taking advantage, the bullies expose Gus' secret to the public, causing Gus to be ostracized by the team, leading to his quitting. When Liz hears, she realizes Gus had been avoiding their attempt to start a family, as he fears his kids would suffer bullying growing up, as a form of karma punishing him. Liz encourages him to apologize to Marcus, which Gus does sincerely just before the final game.

On the day of the big game against Jerry's baseball team at Mel's newly built stadium, Marcus publicly forgives Gus, and Gus rejoins the team, announcing that Marcus is the Benchwarmers' new third-base coach. In the final game, the trio rearrange the team so Nelson and other non-athletic children can replace them, as they have a chance to participate. In the final inning, the Benchwarmers are losing, but Jerry's team sees the Benchwarmers having fun playing anyway. Realizing the true spirit of the game and that Jerry is going too far, Troy and Kyle decide to throw the shutout and let Nelson hit the ball, giving the Benchwarmers the one run. The Benchwarmers storm the field, celebrating not being shut out, and a furious Jerry is humiliated by being left hanging by his underwear on a fence after getting a wedgie by Gus, Richie, Clark, Howie and Mel.

The entire Benchwarmers team, along with Jerry's players, Marcus, Brad's speedo friend, and even Carlos and Wayne, celebrate at Pizza Hut. Richie and Clark get girlfriends, Howie informs Wayne that he has overcome his heliophobia (though is still afraid of the moon), and Gus announces that he's going to become a father.

== Cast ==
- Rob Schneider as Gus Matthews, a nerd and reformed childhood bully who works as a groundskeeper and 1/3 of the Benchwarmers.
- David Spade as Richie Goodman, a nerd and video rental store worker at Video Spot and 1/3 of the Benchwarmers.
- Jon Heder as Clark Reedy, a mentally handicapped nerd and paperboy and 1/3 of the Benchwarmers.
- Jon Lovitz as Mel Carmichael, a former nerd billionaire who funds the Benchwarmers.
- Craig Kilborn as Jerry McDowell, a mean-spirited little league coach and proprietor of Jerry's Lumber that bullied Richie and Clark as a kid.
- Molly Sims as Liz Matthews, the wife of Gus.
- Tim Meadows as Wayne, a little league coach and proprietor of Wayne's Hardware who is one of Jerry's friends.
- Nick Swardson as Howie Goodman, Richie's agoraphobic and heliophobic brother.
- Erinn Bartlett as Sarah, the salad girl at Pizza Hut who Richie falls for.
- Amaury Nolasco as Carlos, a Dominican man whom Jerry recruits to Wayne's little league team.
- Bill Romanowski as Karl, a little league coach and proprietor of Karl's Auto Body who is one of Jerry's friends.
- Sean Salisbury as Brad, a little league coach and proprietor of a sporting goods store who picks on Richie and Clark.
- Matt Weinberg as Kyle Wilson, a member of Jerry's little league team.
- John Farley as an unnamed swimmer boy in a speedo who is associated with Brad
- Reggie Jackson as himself, a baseball player and an old friend of Mel who helps train Gus, Richie, and Clark.
- Joe Gnoffo as Marcus Ellwood, a man with dwarfism who Gus used to pick on when they were boys.
- Patrick Schwarzenegger as Jock Kid Game #3
- Dan Patrick as O'Malley, a poker friend of Brad and Karl.
- Terry Crews as Steven, a poker friend of Brad and Karl who wears a wig.
- Max Prado as Nelson Carmichael, Mel's 12-year-old son who helps out with the Benchwarmers after they saved him from a little league team.
- Jillian Henry as Gretchen Peterson, a friend of Nelson and one of the child commentators for the Benchwarmers' baseball games.
- Garrett Julian as Mitchell, a friend of Nelson and one of the child commentators for the Benchwarmers' baseball games.
- Alex Warrick as Sammy Sprinkler, a spit-talking boy who helps out the Benchwarmers as a statistician.

Cameos:

- Danny McCarthy as Troy, the nephew of Jerry who is a member of his uncle's little league team.
- Jackie Sandler as a Video Spot customer who gives Richie a negative comment about the video she rented
- Jared Sandler as an autograph kid
- Rachel Hunter as a hot mother who becomes Clark Reedy's first kiss
- Rob Moore as Poker Guy #3, an unnamed fellow poker player of Brad, Karl, O'Malley, and Steven.
- Blake Clark as an umpire who Wayne bribes to allow Carlos play for his team
- Dennis Dugan as Coach Bellows, a little league coach operating in Brookdale.
- Charles Dugan as Marty, the elderly boss of Richie at Video Spot.
- Jonathan Loughran as Brad's assistant coach
- Ron Masak as the principal of a Brookdale school who helps Steven reveal Gus' past on the news
- Mary Jo Catlett as Mrs. Ellwood, the mother of Marcus.
- Lochlyn Munro as Ultimate Home Remodel Host
- Matt Willig as a jock guy who watches the baseball game between the Benchwarmers and Jerry's Lumber
- Cleo King as Lady Customer
- Bob Sexton as Karl's assistant coach
- Tom Silardi as Candia Coach
- Michael Moore as Candia Assistant Coach
- J.J. Darwish as a goth kid who watches the baseball game between the Benchwarmers and Jerry's Lumber
- Ellie Schneider as Carol, the girlfriend of a goth kid who watches the baseball game between the Benchwarmers and Jerry's Lumber.
- Gabriel Pimental as a little man that is befriended by a jock guy during the baseball game between the Benchwarmers and Jerry's Lumber
- Jon Moscot (uncredited)

=== Voices ===
- Doug Jones as Number 7, Mel's robot servant.
- James Earl Jones as a Darth Vader Gatekeeper System that is positioned outside of Mel's house.
- William Daniels as KITT (uncredited)

== Production ==
The Benchwarmers was shot at various locations in California, mostly in Agoura Hills, in Chumash Park and at a Pizza Hut. Other locations were Chino Hills; Chino; Culver City; Glendale; Watson Drug Store – Chapman Avenue, Orange; Simi Valley; Westwood, Los Angeles and on Mulholland Hwy, Malibu (Mel's house). In an interview on The Howard Stern Show in 2006, David Spade stated that Artie Lange was originally cast in the role of Clark, which was then offered to Jon Heder (of Napoleon Dynamite fame).

== Reception ==
On Rotten Tomatoes, The Benchwarmers received 13% based on 71 reviews, with the site's consensus reading, "A gross-out comedy that is more sophomoric than funny, The Benchwarmers goes down swinging." On Metacritic, the film has a score of 25 out of 100 based on 17 critics, indicating "generally unfavorable reviews". Audiences polled by CinemaScore gave the film an average grade of "B" on an A+ to F scale.

Manohla Dargis of The New York Times wrote: "The Benchwarmers is the sort of trash that Hollywood does really well" and noted it was only in theaters to raise awareness for the home-rental market. Dargis concludes by quoting Schneider, who called it "a master's thesis on the form of a quintessential Adam Sandler comedy."

Owen Gleiberman of Entertainment Weekly gave it a positive review: "This morphing of "The Bad News Bears" and a "Three Stooges" episode parades its dumbness with such zip that it almost passes for clever."

Bob Smithouser of Plugged In wrote: "The three-man squad known as "The Benchwarmers" becomes a source of hope for nerds everywhere who appreciate being represented."

=== Box office ===
The film was a box office success. In its opening weekend, it grossed $19.6 million, ranking second at the North American box office behind Ice Age: The Meltdown. The film finished with $59,843,754 domestically and $5,113,537 in other markets, totaling $64,957,291 worldwide. The film held the record for the highest opening weekend gross for a baseball genre film, until 2013 when it was surpassed by the Jackie Robinson film 42.

=== Award nominations ===
2006 Teen Choice Awards:

- Choice Movie - Comedy
- Choice Movie Actor – Comedy (Jon Heder)
- Choice Movie Rumble (Jon Heder vs. Karl's Auto Body)
- Choice Movie Chemistry (Rob Schneider, David Spade and Jon Heder)

2006 Stinkers Bad Movie Awards:

- Worst On-Screen Hairstyle (David Spade)

2007 Razzie Awards:

- Worst Actor (Rob Schneider)

2010 Razzie Awards:

- Worst Actor of the Decade (Rob Schneider)

=== Home media ===
The Benchwarmers was released on DVD, Blu-ray and UMD on July 25, 2006, by Sony Pictures Home Entertainment.

== Sequel ==
In July 2018, Revolution Studios and Universal 1440 Entertainment announced a direct-to-DVD sequel titled Benchwarmers 2: Breaking Balls. The film was released on January 29, 2019, with Jon Lovitz reprising his role as Mel Carmichael. The rest of the cast consists of Chris Klein, Chelsey Reist, Lochlyn Munro (who appeared in the first film), and Garfield Wilson.

== See also ==
- List of baseball films
