= Tom Brady (film director) =

American writer and film director (born 1963)

- Born: Thomas Adam Brady; September 2, 1963 (age 62); Bayonne, New Jersey, U.S.
- Occupations: Filmmaker, producer
- Years active: 1987–present

Thomas Adam Brady (born September 2, 1963) is an American filmmaker and producer best known for directing and co-writing the fantasy comedy film The Hot Chick (2002), and co-founding Tiki Tāne Pictures.

== Career ==
Brady was raised in New Jersey. He began writing and acting during high school, earning him a scholarship to Harvard College. At Harvard, where he graduated in 1986 with a B.A. in English Literature, Brady acted in and directed various theater productions, and began writing his own plays and screenplays. Afterwards, he attended the theater department of the University of Hawaiʻi to get a Master of Fine Arts - Directing.

After being invited to work for Mike Reiss and Al Jean, Brady went on to write and produce episodes of The Critic and The Simpsons, which he would follow with other television work such as Home Improvement, Men Behaving Badly, Sports Night, and Good Vibes. Film credits include The Animal, The Hot Chick, The Comebacks, and Bucky Larson: Born to Be a Star. Tom was Executive Producer of the FX television series Chozen.
