= Mr. Deeds =

2002 film by Steven Brill

- Theatrical release poster
- Directed by: Steven Brill
- Screenplay by: Tim Herlihy
- Based on: Mr. Deeds Goes to Town by Robert Riskin; "Opera Hat" by Clarence Budington Kelland
- Produced by: Sid Ganis; Jack Giarraputo
- Starring: Adam Sandler; Winona Ryder; Peter Gallagher; Jared Harris; Allen Covert; Erick Avari; John Turturro
- Cinematography: Peter Lyons Collister
- Edited by: Jeff Gourson
- Music by: Teddy Castellucci
- Production companies: Columbia Pictures; New Line Cinema; Happy Madison Productions; Out of the Blue... Entertainment
- Distributed by: Sony Pictures Releasing
- Release date: June 28, 2002
- Running time: 96 minutes
- Country: United States
- Language: English
- Budget: $50 million
- Box office: $171.3 million

Mr. Deeds is a 2002 American romantic comedy film directed by Steven Brill, written by Tim Herlihy, and produced by Sid Ganis and Jack Giarraputo. It stars Adam Sandler in the title role, alongside Winona Ryder, Peter Gallagher, Jared Harris, Allen Covert, Erick Avari, and John Turturro. The film is a remake of the 1936 Frank Capra film Mr. Deeds Goes to Town, which itself was based on the 1935 short story "Opera Hat" by Clarence Budington Kelland. It tells the story of a pizzeria owner who learns that he is the heir of a late multi-billionaire.

Mr. Deeds was released by Sony Pictures Releasing on June 28, 2002. It received negative reviews from critics, but was a commercial success, grossing $171.3 million against a production budget of $50 million.

== Plot ==
Boisterous billionaire Preston Blake, owner of Blake Media, freezes to death while climbing Mount Everest. During the ensuing media circus, Blake's board of directors, led by the greedy Chuck Cedar, discover his closest living relative is a great-nephew named Longfellow Deeds. Deeds is a kind-hearted and cheerful man who runs a pizzeria in Mandrake Falls, New Hampshire with his friend Jan. He also writes greeting cards in his free time, hoping they might be accepted by Hallmark.

Deeds is flown to New York City, where he meets various Blake staff members, including well-meaning general counsel Cecil Anderson. He also meets Blake's longtime butler Emilio Lopez, who saw Blake as a father figure and quickly befriends Deeds. Plans are made for Deeds to sell his shares in the company for $40 billion, though he must remain in New York for the time being. Cedar grows to despise Deeds, and secretly wants to break up Blake Media.

Cynical television tabloid reporter Babe Bennett, wanting in on the story, invents the false persona of "Pam Dawson" to get close to Deeds. She has her lecherous co-worker Marty pretend to steal her purse in front of Deeds so he can "save her". However, Deeds beats Marty senseless. Deeds is immediately smitten with Babe, who clumsily makes up a story about being a school nurse from the town of "Winchestertonfieldville, Iowa".

Although initially only interested in the story, Babe eventually falls for the kind-hearted Deeds, who writes her a poem and manages to find a real "Winchestertonfieldville, Iowa", to which he takes her on a surprise trip.

Marty reveals Babe's true identity to Cedar and, during a dinner date, the truth is revealed about her deception. Heartbroken, Deeds decides to return home. He is assured that the company will stay open, and asks to donate his money to the United Negro College Fund. However, he later learns from his mentally unstable friend "Crazy Eyes" that Cedar intends to sell the company and lay off thousands of employees.

Babe follows Deeds to Mandrake Falls to win him back, getting into a massive brawl with Jan, who is furious at Babe for hurting her friend. Jan realizes Babe really cares for Deeds and tells her where to find him. While approaching Deeds, Babe falls through the ice of a frozen lake. Deeds hears her cries and saves her from drowning, breaking the ice with his foot, which was rendered rock-hard from a childhood frostbite injury. Despite Babe's pleas for forgiveness, he rejects her, and she sadly returns to New York.

At a shareholders' meeting, Cedar persuades everyone to sell the company until Deeds suddenly arrives. Deeds appeals to all of the shareholders to do the right thing and convinces them to change their minds. However, Cedar reveals that he secretly controls a majority of the shares and overrules them. Babe suddenly arrives, having stolen and studied Blake's personal diary. The diary reveals that forty years earlier, Blake had a brief romance with his maid, Consuela, Emilio's late mother who died while giving birth to him nine months later. Thus, Emilio is Blake's son and the true heir to his stake in the company.

Emilio immediately takes control of Blake Media and fires Cedar and many other corrupt board members, though he keeps Cecil on the board after Deeds approves. Emilio thanks Deeds for his friendship and support, before giving him $1 billion as a farewell gift. Deeds and Babe reconcile and return to Mandrake Falls, where she now works alongside him and Jan at the pizzeria. The poem Deeds wrote for Babe is accepted by Hallmark and becomes a popular greeting card. He has also used some of his money to buy Corvettes for everyone in Mandrake Falls... though "Crazy Eyes" immediately crashes his.

== Cast ==
- Adam Sandler as Longfellow Deeds, Preston Blake's great-nephew, a friendly, helpful owner of a small-town pizzeria who also writes greeting cards, who inherited a billion-dollar empire from his late great-uncle.
- Winona Ryder as Babe Bennett, a reporter for the tabloid television show Inside Access who disguises herself as Pam Dawson, a school nurse, to get close to and gather information on Deeds.
- Peter Gallagher as Chuck Cedar, the CEO for Blake Media and Preston Blake's longtime number two who plots to seize control of Blake Media so he can make a huge profit selling it.
- Jared Harris as Mac McGrath, the dishonest Australian head of Inside Access, who reports on Deeds' antics in New York, often misrepresenting Deeds in a negative light.
- Allen Covert as Marty, a junior reporter for Inside Access, infatuated with and a cohort of Babe, appearing in several disguises to spy on Deeds.
- Erick Avari as Cecil Anderson, the general counsel for Blake Media.
- John Turturro as Emilio Lopez, Preston Blake's long-serving butler and illegitimate son (therefore Deeds' long-lost cousin and the true heir to Blake Media). He has a habit of sneaking up on people unexpectedly and he also has a foot fetish which also explains why Preston does not let him change his socks.
- Peter Dante as Murph, one of Deeds' friends who works at his pizzeria.
- Conchata Ferrell as Jan, a close friend of Deeds who works in the pizzeria and is a retired rodeo clown.
- Harve Presnell as Preston Blake, the billionaire founder and Chairman of Blake Media who freezes to death at the top of Mount Everest.
- J.B. Smoove as Reuben, the elevator operator at the Blake mansion.
- Steve Buscemi as Crazy Eyes, a citizen of Mandrake Falls and one of Deeds' customers who suffers from severe amblyopia.
- Brandon Molale as Kevin Ward, the New York Jets quarterback.
- Blake Clark as Buddy Ward, Kevin Ward's father.
- John McEnroe as himself.
- Craig Castaldo as a fictional version of himself who is a homeless man living in Central Park.
- Jennifer Tisdale as a Card Reader.
- Al Sharpton as himself; he presides over Preston Blake's funeral.
- Walter Williamson as Kurt, a singer at the Metropolitan Opera.
- Roark Critchlow as William.
- Billy St. John as George.
- George Wallace as a UNCF administrator.
- Alfred Dennis as Old Timer.
- Aloma Wright as Coretta Keeling.
- Nancy Arsenault as French investor.
- Barbara Arsenault as French investor.
- Rob Schneider (uncredited) reprises his role as Nazo, a food delivery man who was previously seen in Big Daddy, and appears in two brief scenes where he catches one of the cats that Deeds saves from a burning building and later reads one of Deeds' cards to it.

== Production ==
The producers were looking for a small, "old-fashioned, New England-type" town close to New York, when they serendipitously discovered New Milford, Connecticut, and, upon having lunch there at "The Bistro Cafe", decided the town would be the perfect choice to portray the fictional hometown of Deeds, Mandrake Falls, New Hampshire, and that the cafe was a great location to use as the "Deeds' Pizza" restaurant. Some scenes were also shot in Carmel, New York. Several sequences were filmed in New York City around Spring 2001. Following the September 11, 2001 attacks, images of the World Trade Center towers were digitally removed from several shots of New York City. The Blake Media Hotel scenes were shot in Beverly Hills, California. The scene where Longfellow Deeds and Chuck Cedar are playing tennis at the tennis court was filmed at Roosevelt Island, New York.

== Release ==
=== Home media ===
Mr. Deeds was released on DVD and VHS on October 22, 2002, by Columbia TriStar Home Entertainment.

== Reception ==
=== Critical response ===
Mr. Deeds received mainly negative reviews from critics. On Rotten Tomatoes, the film has an approval rating of 22% based on reviews from 153 critics, with an average rating score of 4.20/10. Its consensus states: "This update of Capra doesn't hold a candle to the original, and even on its own merits, Mr. Deeds is still indifferently acted and stale." Metacritic, which uses a weighted average, assigned the film a score of 24 out of 100, based on 33 critics, indicating "generally unfavorable" reviews. Audiences polled by CinemaScore gave the film an average grade of "A−" on an A+ to F scale.

Mr. Deeds received three Razzie Award nominations including Worst Actor (Adam Sandler), Worst Actress (Winona Ryder), and Worst Remake or Sequel. However, the film also won a Kids' Choice Award for Favorite Movie Actor (Sandler).

=== Box office ===
The film grossed $126 million in the United States and Canada, and $45 million in other countries for a worldwide total of $171 million.

=== Accolades ===
The film won and was nominated for a number of awards throughout 2002-2003.

Year	Ceremony	Category	Recipients	Result
2002	Teen Choice Awards	Choice Movie Actor: Comedy	Adam Sandler	Nominated
2002	Teen Choice Awards	Choice Movie Actress: Comedy	Winona Ryder	Nominated
2003	Golden Raspberry Awards	Worst Actor	Adam Sandler	Nominated
2003	Golden Raspberry Awards	Worst Actress	Winona Ryder	Nominated
2003	Kids' Choice Awards	Favorite Movie Actor	Adam Sandler	Won

== Music ==
=== Soundtrack ===
No.	Title	Music	Length
1.	"Where Are You Going"	Dave Matthews Band	3:52
2.	"Sing"	Travis	3:48
3.	"Let My Love Open the Door"	Pete Townshend	2:44
4.	"Sweetest Thing"	U2	3:03
5.	"Wrong Impression"	Natalie Imbruglia	4:15
6.	"Happy in the Meantime"	Lit
7.	"Island in the Sun"	Weezer	3:20
8.	"Friends & Family"	Trik Turner
9.	"Space Oddity"	Adam Sandler & David Bowie	5:15
10.	"Falling"	Ben Kweller
11.	"Goin' Down To New York Town"	Counting Crows
12.	"I've Seen All Good People"	Yes	3:21
