= List of awards and nominations received by Adam Sandler =

Adam Sandler awards and nominations
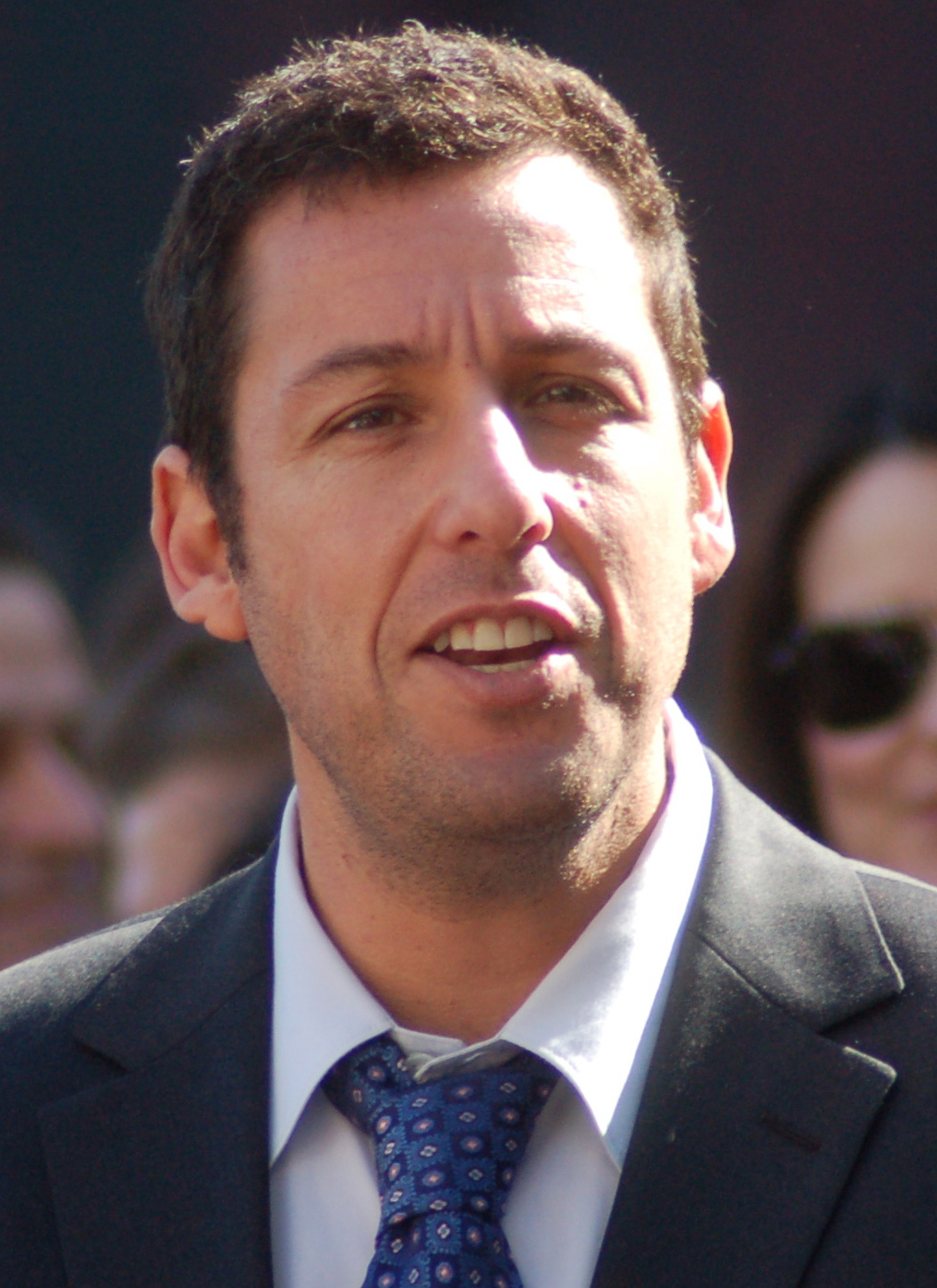
- Sandler in 2011
Awards and nominations
Award	Wins	Nominations
Critics' Choice	0	3
Emmy Awards	0	7
Golden Globes	0	3
Grammy Awards	0	3
SAG Awards	0	1

Totals (Note: Certain award groups do not simply award one winner. They acknowledge several different recipients, have runners-up, and have third place. Since this is a specific recognition and is different from losing an award, runner-up mentions are considered wins in this award tally. For simplification and to avoid errors, each award in this list has been presumed to have had a prior nomination.)
- Wins: 48
- Nominations: 126

Adam Sandler is an actor, comedian, and musician. He is known for his work as a cast member on the NBC sketch comedy series Saturday Night Live and as a leading man in numerous comedy films. He has received a Critics' Choice Movie Award, an Independent Spirit Award, as well as nominations for seven Primetime Emmy Awards, two Golden Globe Awards, three Grammy Awards and a Screen Actors Guild Award. Sandler was awarded a star on the Hollywood Walk of Fame in 2011 and the Mark Twain Prize for American Humor in 2023.

Sandler started his career working as a cast member and writer on the NBC sketch comedy series Saturday Night Live from 1990 to 1995. There he gained stardom and acclaim earning three nominations for the Primetime Emmy Award for Outstanding Writing for a Variety Series. In 2018, he returned to the show as a host and was nominated for the Primetime Emmy Award for Outstanding Guest Actor in a Comedy Series. For his second Netflix comedy special Adam Sandler: 100% Fresh (2018) he was nominated for the Primetime Emmy Award for Outstanding Writing for a Variety Special. For his third Netflix comedy special Adam Sandler: Love You (2024) he was nominated for the Primetime Emmy Award for Outstanding Variety Special (Pre-Recorded) and the Golden Globe Award for Best Performance in Stand-Up Comedy on Television.

Sandler has received various audiences awards including six MTV Movie Awards, twelve Nickelodeon Kids' Choice Awards, nine People's Choice Awards and three Teen Choice Awards for his leading man roles for his numerous comedy films such as Billy Madison (1995), Happy Gilmore (1996), The Waterboy (1998), The Wedding Singer (1998), Big Daddy (1999), Mr. Deeds (2002), 50 First Dates (2004), and Click (2006).

Sandler is also known for his dramatic roles including the Paul Thomas Anderson absurdist romance Punch-Drunk Love (2002) for which he was nominated for the Golden Globe Award for Best Actor in a Motion Picture – Musical or Comedy. He acted in the Noah Baumbach family drama The Meyerowitz Stories (2017) for which he was nominated for the Critics' Choice Movie Award for Best Actor in a Comedy. He played a Jewish jeweler and gambling addict in the Safdie brothers crime thriller Uncut Gems (2019) for which he won the Independent Spirit Award for Best Male Lead and was nominated for the Critics' Choice Movie Award for Best Actor. He portrayed a coach scout in the sports drama Hustle (2022) for which he was nominated for the Screen Actors Guild Award for Outstanding Actor in a Leading Role.

As a standup comedian, he received three nominations for the Grammy Award for Best Comedy Album for They're All Gonna Laugh at You! (1994), What the Hell Happened to Me? (1997), and Stan and Judy's Kid (2000).

== Major associations ==
=== Critics' Choice Awards ===
Year	Category	Nominated work	Result	Ref.
Critics' Choice Movie Awards
2017	Best Actor in a Comedy	The Meyerowitz Stories	Nominated	
2019	Best Actor	Uncut Gems	Nominated	
2025	Best Supporting Actor	Jay Kelly	Nominated	

=== Emmy Awards ===
Year	Category	Nominated work	Result	Ref.
Primetime Emmy Awards
1991	Outstanding Writing for a Variety or Music Program	Saturday Night Live	Nominated	
1992	Outstanding Writing for Variety Series	Saturday Night Live	Nominated	
1993	Outstanding Writing for Variety Series	Saturday Night Live	Nominated	
2019	Outstanding Guest Actor in a Comedy Series	Saturday Night Live	Nominated	
2019	Outstanding Writing for a Variety Special	Adam Sandler: 100% Fresh	Nominated	
2025	Outstanding Variety Special (Pre-Recorded)	Adam Sandler: Love You	Nominated	
2025	Outstanding Original Music and Lyrics	SNL50: The Anniversary Special	Nominated	

=== Golden Globe Awards ===
Year	Category	Nominated work	Result	Ref.
2003	Best Actor – Motion Picture Musical or Comedy	Punch-Drunk Love	Nominated	
2025	Best Stand-Up Comedy Performance – Television	Adam Sandler: Love You	Nominated	
2026	Best Supporting Actor in a Motion Picture	Jay Kelly	Nominated	

=== Grammy Awards ===
Year	Category	Nominated work	Result	Ref.
1994	Best Comedy Album	They're All Gonna Laugh at You!	Nominated	
1997	Best Comedy Album	What the Hell Happened to Me?	Nominated	
2000	Best Comedy Album	Stan and Judy's Kid	Nominated	

=== Screen Actors Guild Awards ===
Year	Category	Nominated work	Result	Ref.
2022	Outstanding Actor in a Leading Role	Hustle	Nominated	

== Other awards and nominations ==
Organizations	Year	Category	Work	Result	Ref.
Annie Awards	2013	Outstanding Voice Acting in a Feature Production	Hotel Transylvania	Nominated	
Astra Film Awards	2026	Best Supporting Actor – Comedy or Musical	Jay Kelly	Won	
Boston Society of Film Critics	2017	Best Cast	The Meyerowitz Stories	Won	
Boston Society of Film Critics	2019	Best Actor	Uncut Gems	Won	
Independent Spirit Awards	2020	Best Male Lead	Uncut Gems	Won	
Capri Hollywood International Film Festival	2025	Capri Ensemble Cast Award (Note: Shared with George Clooney, Billy Crudup, Laura Dern, Alba Rohrwacher and Giovanni Esposito)	Jay Kelly	Won	
Capri Hollywood International Film Festival	2025	Best Supporting Actor	Jay Kelly	Won	
CinemaCon Awards	2014	Male Star of the Year	Adam Sandler	Won	
Golden Raspberry Awards	1997	Worst Actor	Bulletproof	Nominated	
Golden Raspberry Awards	1997	Worst Actor	Happy Gilmore	Nominated	
Golden Raspberry Awards	1999	Worst Actor	The Waterboy	Nominated	
Golden Raspberry Awards	2000	Worst Actor	Big Daddy	Won	
Golden Raspberry Awards	2000	Worst Screenplay	Big Daddy	Nominated	
Golden Raspberry Awards	2001	Worst Screenplay	Little Nicky	Nominated	
Golden Raspberry Awards	2001	Worst Actor	Little Nicky	Nominated	
Golden Raspberry Awards	2003	Worst Actor	Eight Crazy Nights	Nominated	
Golden Raspberry Awards	2003	Worst Actor	Mr. Deeds	Nominated	
Golden Raspberry Awards	2006	Worst Picture	Deuce Bigalow: European Gigolo	Nominated	
Golden Raspberry Awards	2006	Worst Prequel, Remake, Rip-off or Sequel	Deuce Bigalow: European Gigolo	Nominated	
Golden Raspberry Awards	2008	Worst Picture	I Now Pronounce You Chuck and Larry	Nominated	
Golden Raspberry Awards	2008	Worst Actor	I Now Pronounce You Chuck and Larry	Nominated	
Golden Raspberry Awards	2008	Worst Screen Couple	I Now Pronounce You Chuck and Larry	Nominated	
Golden Raspberry Awards	2012	Worst Picture	Jack and Jill	Won	
Golden Raspberry Awards	2012	Worst Picture	Bucky Larson: Born to Be a Star	Nominated	
Golden Raspberry Awards	2012	Worst Actor	Just Go with It	Won	
Golden Raspberry Awards	2012	Worst Actor	Jack and Jill	Won	
Golden Raspberry Awards	2012	Worst Actress	Jack and Jill	Won	
Golden Raspberry Awards	2012	Worst Screenplay	Jack and Jill	Won	
Golden Raspberry Awards	2012	Worst Screenplay	Bucky Larson: Born to Be a Star	Nominated	
Golden Raspberry Awards	2012	Worst Prequel, Remake, Rip-off or Sequel	Bucky Larson: Born to Be a Star	Nominated	
Golden Raspberry Awards	2012	Worst Prequel, Remake, Rip-off or Sequel	Jack and Jill	Won	
Golden Raspberry Awards	2012	Worst Screen Combo	Jack and Jill	Won	
Golden Raspberry Awards	2012	Worst Screen Combo	Just Go With It	Nominated	
Golden Raspberry Awards	2012	Worst Screen Ensemble	Jack and Jill	Won	
Golden Raspberry Awards	2013	Worst Picture	That's My Boy	Nominated	
Golden Raspberry Awards	2013	Worst Actor	That's My Boy	Won	
Golden Raspberry Awards	2013	Worst Screen Couple	That's My Boy	Nominated	
Golden Raspberry Awards	2013	Worst Screen Ensemble	That's My Boy	Nominated	
Golden Raspberry Awards	2014	Worst Picture	Grown Ups 2	Nominated	
Golden Raspberry Awards	2014	Worst Actor	Grown Ups 2	Nominated	
Golden Raspberry Awards	2014	Worst Screenplay	Grown Ups 2	Nominated	
Golden Raspberry Awards	2014	Worst Prequel, Remake, Rip-off or Sequel	Grown Ups 2	Nominated	
Golden Raspberry Awards	2014	Worst Screen Combo	Grown Ups 2	Nominated	
Golden Raspberry Awards	2015	Worst Actor	Blended	Nominated	
Golden Raspberry Awards	2016	Worst Actor	The Cobbler	Nominated	
Golden Raspberry Awards	2016	Worst Actor	Pixels	Nominated	
Golden Raspberry Awards	2016	Worst Picture	Pixels	Nominated	
Golden Raspberry Awards	2016	Worst Picture	Paul Blart: Mall Cop 2	Nominated	
Golden Raspberry Awards	2016	Worst Prequel, Remake, Rip-off or Sequel	Paul Blart: Mall Cop 2	Nominated	
Golden Raspberry Awards	2016	Worst Screen Combo	The Coobler	Nominated	
Golden Raspberry Awards	2020	Razzie Redeemer Award	Uncut Gems	Nominated	
Golden Raspberry Awards	2021	Worst Actor	Hubie Halloween	Nominated	
Golden Raspberry Awards	2021	Worst Screen Combo	Hubie Halloween	Nominated	
Golden Raspberry Awards	2021	Worst Prequel, Remake, Rip-off or Sequel	Hubie Halloween	Nominated	
Gijón International Film Festival	2002	Best Actor	Punch-Drunk Love	Won	
Gotham Independent Film Awards	2017	Best Actor	The Meyerowitz Stories	Nominated	
Gotham Independent Film Awards	2019	Best Actor	Uncut Gems	Nominated	
Gotham Independent Film Awards	2025	Outstanding Supporting Performance	Jay Kelly	Nominated	
Hollywood Film Awards	2017	Hollywood Comedy Award	The Meyerowitz Stories	Won	
MTV Movie & TV Awards	1995	Best Comedic Performance	Billy Madison	Nominated	
MTV Movie & TV Awards	1996	Best Comedic Performance	Happy Gilmore	Nominated	
MTV Movie & TV Awards	1996	Best Fight (vs. Bob Barker)	Happy Gilmore	Won	
MTV Movie & TV Awards	1998	Best On-Screen Duo (with Drew Barrymore)	The Wedding Singer	Nominated	
MTV Movie & TV Awards	1998	Best Comedic Performance	The Wedding Singer	Nominated	
MTV Movie & TV Awards	1998	Best Kiss (with Drew Barrymore)	The Wedding Singer	Won	
MTV Movie & TV Awards	1999	Best Comedic Performance	The Waterboy	Won	
MTV Movie & TV Awards	2000	Best Comedic Performance	Big Daddy	Won	
MTV Movie & TV Awards	2003	Best Kiss (with Emily Watson)	Punch-Drunk Love	Nominated	
MTV Movie & TV Awards	2003	Best Comedic Performance	Punch-Drunk Love	Nominated	
MTV Movie & TV Awards	2004	Best On-Screen Duo (with Drew Barrymore)	50 First Dates	Won	
MTV Movie & TV Awards	2006	Best Comedic Performance	The Longest Yard	Nominated	
MTV Movie & TV Awards	2007	Best Comedic Performance	Click	Nominated	
MTV Movie & TV Awards	2008	Best Comedic Performance	I Now Pronounce You Chuck & Larry	Nominated	
MTV Movie & TV Awards	2011	Best Comedic Performance	Just Go with It	Nominated	
MTV Movie & TV Awards	2023	Best Comedic Performance	Murder Mystery 2	Won	
National Board of Review	2019	Best Actor	Uncut Gems	Won	
Nickelodeon Kids' Choice Awards	1999	Favorite Movie Actor	The Wedding Singer and The Waterboy	Won	
Nickelodeon Kids' Choice Awards	2003	Favorite Movie Actor	Mr. Deeds	Won	
Nickelodeon Kids' Choice Awards	2003	Favorite Voice from an Animated Movie	Eight Crazy Nights	Won	
Nickelodeon Kids' Choice Awards	2004	Wannabe Award	Himself	Won	
Nickelodeon Kids' Choice Awards	2005	Favorite Movie Actor	50 First Dates	Won	
Nickelodeon Kids' Choice Awards	2007	Favorite Movie Actor	Click	Won	
Nickelodeon Kids' Choice Awards	2009	Favorite Movie Actor	Bedtime Stories	Nominated	
Nickelodeon Kids' Choice Awards	2012	Favorite Movie Actor	Jack and Jill	Won	
Nickelodeon Kids' Choice Awards	2013	Favorite Voice from an Animated Movie	Hotel Transylvania	Won	
Nickelodeon Kids' Choice Awards	2014	Favorite Movie Actor	Grown Ups 2	Won	
Nickelodeon Kids' Choice Awards	2019	Favorite Male Voice in an Animated Movie	Hotel Transylvania 3: Summer Vacation	Won	
Nickelodeon Kids' Choice Awards	2021	Favorite Movie Actor	Hubie Halloween	Nominated	
Nickelodeon Kids' Choice Awards	2023	King of Comedy	Himself	Won	
Nickelodeon Kids' Choice Awards	2024	Favorite Movie Actor	You Are So Not Invited to My Bat Mitzvah	Nominated	
Nickelodeon Kids' Choice Awards	2024	Favorite Male Voice in an Animated Movie	Leo	Won	
Palm Springs International Film Festival	2026	Chairman's Award	Jay Kelly	Won	
People's Choice Awards	2000	Favorite Actor In A Comedy Motion Picture	Big Daddy	Won	
People's Choice Awards	2005	Favorite On-Screen Match-Up	50 First Dates	Won	
People's Choice Awards	2008	Favorite Funny Male Star	Adam Sandler	Nominated	
People's Choice Awards	2009	Favorite Funny Male Star	Adam Sandler	Won	
People's Choice Awards	2010	Favorite Comedic Star	Adam Sandler	Nominated	
People's Choice Awards	2011	Favorite Comedic Star	Adam Sandler	Won	
People's Choice Awards	2012	Favorite Comedic Movie Actor	Adam Sandler	Won	
People's Choice Awards	2013	Favorite Comedic Movie Actor	Adam Sandler	Won	
People's Choice Awards	2014	Favorite Comedic Movie Actor	Adam Sandler	Won	
People's Choice Awards	2015	Favorite Comedic Movie Actor	Adam Sandler	Won	
People's Choice Awards	2016	Favorite Animated Movie Voice	Hotel Transylvania 2	Nominated	
People's Choice Awards	2019	The Comedy Movie Star of 2019	Murder Mystery	Nominated	
People's Choice Awards	2022	The Comedy Movie Star of 2022	Hustle	Won	
People's Choice Awards	2024	The Comedy Movie Star of the Year	You Are So Not Invited to My Bat Mitzvah	Nominated	
Santa Barbara International Film Festival	2026	Maltin Modern Master Award	Jay Kelly	Won	
Teen Choice Awards	2002	Choice Movie Actor: Comedy	Mr. Deeds	Nominated	
Teen Choice Awards	2003	Choice Movie Actor: Comedy	Anger Management	Nominated	
Teen Choice Awards	2004	Choice Movie Actor: Comedy	50 First Dates	Won	
Teen Choice Awards	2005	Choice Movie Actor: Comedy	The Longest Yard	Nominated	
Teen Choice Awards	2006	Choice Movie Actor: Comedy	Click	Nominated	
Teen Choice Awards	2006	Choice Movie: Chemistry	Click	Nominated	
Teen Choice Awards	2006	Choice Movie: Hissy Fit	Click	Nominated	
Teen Choice Awards	2006	Choice Comedian	Adam Sandler	Won	
Teen Choice Awards	2011	Choice Movie Actor: Romantic Comedy	Just Go with It	Nominated	
Teen Choice Awards	2011	Choice Movie: Chemistry	Just Go with It	Won	
Teen Choice Awards	2012	Choice Summer Movie Star: Male	That's My Boy	Nominated	
Teen Choice Awards	2014	Choice Movie Actor: Comedy	Blended	Nominated	
Teen Choice Awards	2015	Choice Summer Movie Star: Male	Pixels	Nominated	

== Special honors ==
Year	Award	Result	Ref.
2011	Star on the Hollywood Walk of Fame	Honored	
2023	Mark Twain Prize for American Humor	Honored	

== See also ==
- Adam Sandler filmography
