= Adam Sandler filmography =

Performances by American actor

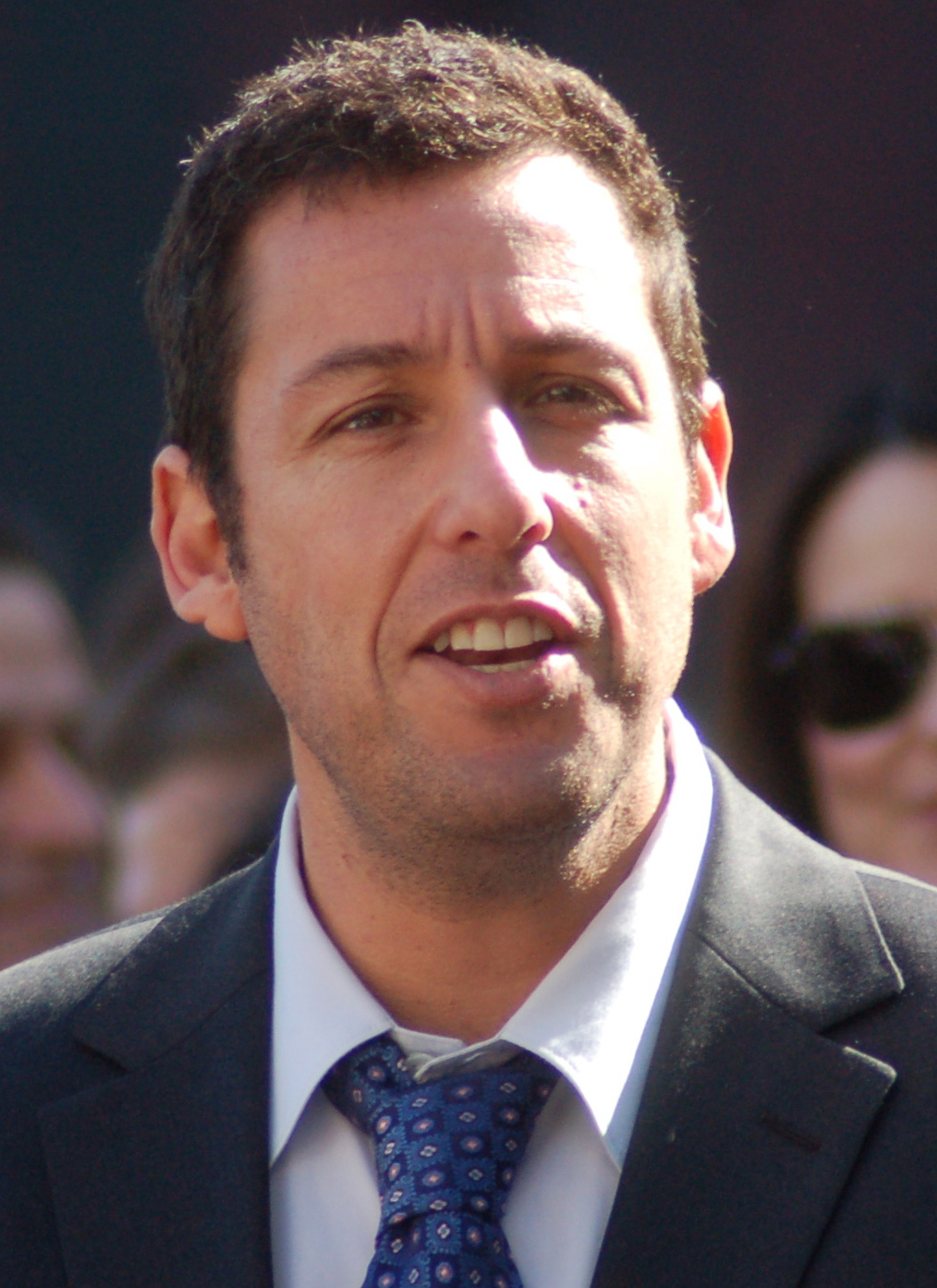
- Sandler in 2011
- Film: 70
- Television: 23
- Documentary: 4

The following is the filmography of American actor and comedian Adam Sandler.

== Film ==
Year	Title	Role	Actor	Producer	Screenwriter	Notes
1989	Going Overboard	Schecky Moskowitz	Yes	No	Yes	
1991	Shakes the Clown	Dink the Clown	Yes	No	No	
1993	Coneheads	Carmine Weiner	Yes	No	No	
1994	Airheads	Pip, the drummer	Yes	No	No	
1994	Mixed Nuts	Louie Capshaw	Yes	No	No	
1995	Billy Madison	Billy Madison	Yes	No	Yes	
1996	Happy Gilmore	Happy Gilmore	Yes	No	Yes	
1996	Bulletproof	Archie Moses	Yes	No	No	
1998	The Wedding Singer	Robbie Hart	Yes	No	No	
1998	Dirty Work	Satan	Yes	No	No	Uncredited cameo
1998	The Waterboy	Robert "Bobby" Boucher, Jr.	Yes	Yes	Yes	Executive producer
1999	Big Daddy	Sonny Koufax	Yes	Yes	Yes	Executive producer
1999	Deuce Bigalow: Male Gigolo	Robert Justin	Yes	Yes	No	Uncredited voice cameo Executive producer
2000	Little Nicky	Nicholas "Little Nicky"	Yes	Yes	Yes	Executive producer
2001	Joe Dirt	—N/a	No	Yes	No	Executive producer
2001	The Concert for New York City	Operaman	Yes	No	No	Cameo
2001	The Animal	Townie	Yes	Yes	No	Cameo; Executive producer
2002	Punch-Drunk Love	Barry Egan	Yes	No	No	
2002	Mr. Deeds	Mr. Longfellow Deeds	Yes	Yes	No	Executive producer
2002	The Master of Disguise	—N/a	No	Yes	No	Executive producer
2002	Eight Crazy Nights	Davey Stone / Whitey Duvall / Eleanor Duvall / Deer	Yes	Yes	Yes	Voice
2002	A Day with the Meatball	Himself	Yes	Yes	Yes	Short film
2002	The Hot Chick	Mambuza Bongo Guy	Yes	Yes	No	Uncredited cameo Executive producer
2003	Pauly Shore Is Dead	Himself	Yes	No	No	Voice cameo
2003	Stupidity	Himself	Yes	No	No	Documentary
2003	Couch	Couch Testing Guy	Yes	No	No	Short film
2003	Anger Management	Dave Buznik	Yes	Yes	No	Executive producer
2003	Dickie Roberts: Former Child Star	—N/a	No	Yes	No	
2004	50 First Dates	Henry Roth	Yes	No	No	
2004	Spanglish	John Clasky	Yes	No	No	
2005	The Longest Yard	Paul Crewe	Yes	Yes	No	Executive producer
2005	Deuce Bigalow: European Gigolo	Javier Sandooski	Yes	Yes	No	Uncredited cameo
2006	Grandma's Boy	—N/a	No	Yes	No	Executive producer
2006	The Benchwarmers	—N/a	No	Yes	No	
2006	Click	Michael Newman	Yes	Yes	No	
2007	Reign Over Me	Charles "Charlie" Fineman	Yes	No	No	
2007	I Now Pronounce You Chuck & Larry	Charles "Chuck" Levine	Yes	Yes	No	
2008	Strange Wilderness	—N/a	No	Yes	No	Executive producer
2008	You Don't Mess with the Zohan	Zohan Dvir / Scrappy Coco	Yes	Yes	Yes	
2008	The House Bunny	—N/a	No	Yes	No	
2008	Bedtime Stories	Skeeter Bronson	Yes	Yes	No	
2009	Paul Blart: Mall Cop	—N/a	No	Yes	No	
2009	Funny People	George Simmons	Yes	No	No	
2009	The Shortcut	—N/a	No	Yes	No	Executive producer
2010	Grown Ups	Leonard "Lenny" Feder	Yes	Yes	Yes	
2011	Just Go with It	Dr. Daniel "Danny" Maccabee	Yes	Yes	No	
2011	Zookeeper	Donald the Capuchin Monkey	Yes	Yes	No	Voice
2011	Bucky Larson: Born to Be a Star	—N/a	No	Yes	Yes	
2011	Jack and Jill	Jack & Jill Sadelstein	Yes	Yes	Yes	
2012	That's My Boy	Donny Berger	Yes	Yes	No	
2012	Hotel Transylvania	Count "Drac" Dracula	Yes	Yes	No	Voice; Executive producer
2012	Here Comes the Boom	—N/a	No	Yes	No	Executive producer
2013	Grown Ups 2	Leonard "Lenny" Feder	Yes	Yes	Yes	
2014	Blended	Jim Friedman	Yes	Yes	No	
2014	Top Five	Himself	Yes	No	No	Cameo
2014	Men, Women & Children	Don Truby	Yes	No	No	
2014	The Cobbler	Max Simkin	Yes	No	No	
2015	Paul Blart: Mall Cop 2	—N/a	No	Yes	No	
2015	Joe Dirt 2: Beautiful Loser	—N/a	No	Yes	No	Executive producer
2015	Pixels	Sam Brenner	Yes	Yes	No	
2015	I Am Chris Farley	Himself	Yes	No	No	Documentary
2015	Hotel Transylvania 2	Count "Drac" Dracula	Yes	Yes	Yes	Voice; Executive producer
2015	The Ridiculous 6	Tommy "White Knife" Stockburn	Yes	Yes	Yes	
2016	The Do-Over	Max Kessler	Yes	Yes	No	
2017	Sandy Wexler	Sandy Wexler	Yes	Yes	Yes	
2017	The Meyerowitz Stories (New and Selected)	Danny Meyerowitz	Yes	No	No	
2017	Puppy!	Count "Drac" Dracula	Yes	No	No	Voice; Short film
2018	The Week Of	Kenny Lustig	Yes	Yes	Yes	
2018	Hotel Transylvania 3: Summer Vacation	Count "Drac" Dracula	Yes	No	No	Voice
2019	Murder Mystery	Nick Spitz	Yes	Yes	No	
2019	Uncut Gems	Howard Ratner	Yes	No	No	
2020	Goldman v Silverman	Rod Goldman	Yes	No	Yes	Short film
2020	The Wrong Missy	—N/a	No	Yes	No	Executive producer
2020	Nature Planet	Narrator	Yes	Yes	No	Voice; Short film
2020	Hubie Halloween	Hubie Dubois	Yes	Yes	Yes	
2022	Home Team	—N/a	No	Yes	No	
2022	Norm Macdonald: Nothing Special	Himself	Yes	No	No	Stand up special
2022	Hustle	Stanley Sugerman	Yes	Yes	No	
2023	Murder Mystery 2	Nick Spitz	Yes	Yes	No	
2023	The Out-Laws	—N/a	No	Yes	No	
2023	You Are So Not Invited to My Bat Mitzvah	Danny Friedman	Yes	Yes	No	
2023	Leo	Leonardo	Yes	Yes	Yes	Voice
2024	Spaceman	Jakub Procházka	Yes	No	No	
2025	Kinda Pregnant	—N/a	No	Yes	No	
2025	Happy Gilmore 2	Happy Gilmore	Yes	Yes	Yes	
2025	Jay Kelly	Ron Sukenick	Yes	No	No	
2025	Stans	Himself	Yes	No	No	Documentary
2025	Being Eddie	Himself	Yes	No	No	Documentary
2026	Roommates	—N/a	No	Yes	No	
2026	Don't Say Good Luck	—N/a	No	Yes	No	
TBA	Time Out	Vincent	Yes	No	No	Post-production
TBA	Grown Ups 3	Lenny Feder	Yes	Yes	Yes	Filming

== Television ==
Year	Title	Role	Notes
1987–1988	The Cosby Show	Smitty	4 episodes
1987–1990	Remote Control	The Stud Boy and the Trivia Delinquent	Game show
1990	The Marshall Chronicles	Usher	Episode: "Brightman SATyricon"
1990	ABC Afterschool Special	Drug Dealer	Episode: "Testing Dirty"
1990	The Dog Police	Shifty	Television film
1990–1995	Saturday Night Live	Various	92 episodes
1993	The Larry Sanders Show	Himself	Episode: "Hank's Wedding"
1996	Adam Sandler: What the Hell Happened to Me	Himself	Stand-up special
1996–2024	Saturday Night Live	Himself / various	1 episode as host, 5 episodes as guest
2001	Undeclared	Himself	Episode: "The Assistant"
2007	The King of Queens	Jeff "The Beast" Sussman	Episode: "Mild Bunch"; uncredited
2007–2013	Rules of Engagement	—N/a	Executive producer
2009	Sesame Street	Himself	2 episodes
2011–2012	Breaking In	—N/a	Executive producer
2013	SS	Himself	Uncredited; Episode: "Punched Dumped Love"
2014	Brooklyn Nine-Nine	Himself	Episode: "Operation: Broken Feather"
2016, 2018	Kevin Can Wait	Jimmy Lander	Uncredited; 2 episodes
2017	Real Rob	Himself	Episode: "Authentic Self"
2020	Home Movie: The Princess Bride	Grandfather	Episode: "Chapter One: As You Wish"

== Standup Specials ==
Year	Tite
2018	Adam Sandler: 100% Fresh
2024	Adam Sandler: Love You
