= What's Your Name? =

Studio album by Adam Sandler
- Released: September 16, 1997
- Genres: Comedy; parody
- Length: 63:46
- Label: Warner Bros.
- Producers: Brooks Arthur; Allen Covert; Adam Sandler

Adam Sandler chronology
What the Hell Happened to Me? (1996)	What's Your Name? (1997)	Stan and Judy's Kid (1999)

What's Your Name? is the third studio album by Adam Sandler, released in 1997. Unlike his other comedy albums, which typically mix songs with non-musical comedy skits, What's Your Name? consists mostly of songs and only includes one skit. The songs are recorded in various genres, including country, hard rock, 2 Springsteen-influenced numbers, ballad and reggae, as well as the inclusion of "Red Hooded Sweatshirt", which Sandler originally performed on Saturday Night Live in 1993. What's Your Name? was certified gold, having sold over 500,000 copies.

"The Lonesome Kicker", a Bruce Springsteen-inspired song about the life of a lonely football kicker, was released as the lone single from the album and was accompanied by a music video that got airplay on MTV. This song also partly inspired Sandler's 1998 sports comedy film The Waterboy.

== Critical reception ==
Professional ratings
Review scores
Source	Rating
AllMusic	4/5 stars
Pitchfork	5.5/10

The album received mixed reviews from critics. Allmusic senior editor and critic Stephen Thomas Erlewine wrote: "Sandler may display a few new tricks, but it's not enough to win new fans, even if What's Your Name will satisfy his legions of followers." James P. Wisdom of Pitchfork stated: "What's My Name is typical Sandler as we love him, but none of these tracks compare to his last two records."

== Track listing ==
No.	Title	Length
1.	"Moyda"	4:20
2.	"The Lonesome Kicker"	5:57
3.	"Bad Boyfriend"	3:54
4.	"Pickin' Daisies"	6:05
5.	"Corduroy Blues"	4:04
6.	"Listenin' to the Radio" (F. Coraci, A. Covert, J. Rosenberg, A. Sandler, Waddy Wachtel)	4:40
7.	"Sweet Beatrice"	6:55
8.	"Dancin' and Pantsin'"	3:56
9.	"Zittly Van Zittles"	2:29
10.	"Four Years Old"	2:32
11.	"Voodoo"	4:09
12.	"The Respect Chant" (Skit)	0:59
13.	"The Goat Song"	7:49
14.	"Red Hooded Sweatshirt"	5:57
Total length:		63:46

== Personnel ==
- Adam Sandler - vocals, guitar, producer
- Brooks Arthur - vocals, producer
- Frank Coraci - vocals
- Rob Corsi - vocals
- Michael Dilbeck - vocals
- Jack Giarraputo - vocals, photography
- Sanetta Gipson - vocals, backing vocals
- Michael Ly - vocals
- Jillian Sandler - vocals
- Kim Schwartz - vocals, backing vocals
- Raydi Siegel - vocals
- The Wailing Souls - backing vocals
- Mike Thompson - guitar, keyboards
- Waddy Wachtel - guitar, backing vocals
- Mindi Abair - saxophone, backing vocals
- Greg Leisz - pedal steel
- John "Juke" Logan - harmonica
- David McKelvy - harmonica
- Teddy Castellucci - multiple instruments
- Bob Glaub - multiple instruments
- Don Heffington - multiple instruments
- Jon Rosenberg - multiple instruments, producer, photography
- Allen Covert - producer
- Johnathan Loughran - associate producer
- Jolie Levine - production coordination
- Francis Buckley - engineer
- Gabe Veltri - engineer, mixing
- Rudy Haeusermann - assistant engineer
- Michael Parnin - assistant engineer
- Jeff Robinette - assistant engineer
- Stephen Marcussen - mastering
- Ron Boustead - digital editing
- Scott Free - stylist
- Vonda Morris - make-up
- David Harlan - design
- Ann Pala - design
- Linda Cobb - art direction
- Nick DeCesare - artwork
- Lester Cohen - photography
- Kimberly Wright - photography

== Charts ==
=== Weekly charts ===
Chart (1997)	Peak position
US Billboard 200	18
Canada Top Albums/CDs (RPM)	30

== Certifications ==
Region	Certification	Certified units/sales
United States (RIAA)	Gold	500,000^{^}
^{^} Shipments figures based on certification alone.
