= The Chanukah Song =

1994 novelty song by Adam Sandler

"The Chanukah Song" is a novelty song written by comedian Adam Sandler with Saturday Night Live co-star Norm Macdonald and writers Lewis Morton and Ian Maxtone-Graham and originally performed by Sandler on Saturday Night Live's Weekend Update on December 3, 1994. Sandler subsequently performed the song as part of his stand-up act, later updating it with new lyrics. All variations center on the theme of Hanukkah and of religious Jewish children feeling alienated during the Christmas season, and Sandler's listing of Jewish celebrities (with both real-life and fictional connections to Judaism) as a way of sympathizing with their situation.

== Part I (1994) ==
"The Chanukah Song"

Single by Adam Sandler

from the album What the Hell Happened to Me?
- Released: 1995
- Genre: Comedy
- Length: 3:44
- Label: Warner Bros.
- Songwriters: Adam Sandler, Ian Maxtone-Graham, Lewis Morton
- Producers: Adam Sandler, Brooks Arthur

Adam Sandler singles chronology
"Lunchlady Land" (1993)	"The Chanukah Song" (1995)	"Bleeps" (1996)

This version appeared on Sandler's 1996 comedy album What the Hell Happened to Me? Persons referenced in "The Chanukah Song":

- David Lee Roth
- James Caan
- Kirk Douglas
- Dinah Shore (replaced in some performances with Pauly Shore)
- Jon Bauman (Bowzer from Sha Na Na)
- Arthur Fonzarelli (Henry Winkler; the character within the context of Happy Days was one-quarter Jewish through his maternal grandmother).
- Paul Newman (Jewish father)
- Goldie Hawn (Jewish mother)
- Captain Kirk (William Shatner)
- Mr. Spock (Leonard Nimoy)
- "The owner of the Seattle SuperSonic-ahs" (founding partners Sam Schulman and Gene Klein)
- O. J. Simpson was declared as "not a Jew!" to great applause from the audience.
- Rod Carew (Sandler erroneously claims "he converted;" Carew's wife and children are Jewish but he did not convert)
- Ann Landers (Eppie Lederer)
- Dear Abby (Pauline Phillips at the time)
- Harrison Ford (Sandler understated Ford's Jewish ancestry by saying he is a quarter Jewish)
- Ebenezer Scrooge (Sandler says that "some people think" Scrooge is Jewish, but insists that he is not).
- All of The Three Stooges (brothers Moe, Shemp and Curly Howard, Larry Fine, and Joe Besser)
- Tom Cruise, a Scientologist, is mentioned in the song as not Jewish (Sandler jokes during the song that he “hear(s) his agent is” Jewish; Cruise's agent at the time of this song's release was Kevin Huvane who is not Jewish and would later be an ordained minister).

Sandler also makes reference to the Carnegie Deli, a famed Jewish restaurant in New York City (closed in 2016), and mentions that "you don't need" two Christmas songs: "Jingle Bell Rock" and "Deck the Halls".

Several of the celebrities named in the song responded to it:

- Henry Winkler, who played Fonzarelli and is himself Jewish, was deeply flattered by the inclusion and began a long collaboration with Sandler afterward.
- Barry Ackerley was the owner of the Seattle SuperSonics at the time, having bought the team from Schulman and Klein in 1985. Ackerley, a Christian, was upset with Sandler about the implication that he was Jewish and confronted Sandler in a restaurant at some time in the late 1990s telling Sandler to "86 that song." (The situation would eventually correct itself when, in 2001, Ackerley sold the team to Jewish businessman Howard Schultz.)
- Rod Carew, despite the misrepresentation of his ties to Judaism, told Sandler that he thought the song was quite funny.
- Harrison Ford, whose mother was fully Jewish, met Sandler and corrected him with a single word: "Half!"

During the final verse, performed originally on Saturday Night Live and on a radio cut, Sandler sings the line "Drink your gin and tonic-ah, but don't smoke marijuan-icah". On the uncut album version, and during various concert appearances, the line was changed to "Drink your gin and tonic-ah, and smoke your marijuan-icah". The uncut version, despite the reference to marijuana, receives most radio airplay today; another radio edit skips completely over the gin and tonic/marijuana line altogether.

=== Chart performance ===
Chart (1996–98)	Peak position
US Billboard Hot 100	80
US Adult Pop Airplay (Billboard)	28
US Alternative Airplay (Billboard)	25

=== Certifications ===
Region	Certification	Certified units/sales
United States (RIAA)	Gold	500,000^{^}
^{^} Shipments figures based on certification alone.

== Part II (1999) ==
"The Chanukah Song, Part II"

Single by Adam Sandler

from the album Stan and Judy's Kid
- Released: 1999
- Recorded: Brandeis University
- Genre: Comedy

"The Chanukah Song, Part II" was recorded live at Brandeis University for Sandler's 1999 album Stan and Judy's Kid.

Persons referenced in "The Chanukah Song, Part II":

- "You" (the hypothetical Jewish listener)
- "Me" (Adam Sandler)
- Winona Ryder (whose father is Jewish)
- Ralph Lauren
- Calvin Klein
- Louise Post and Nina Gordon of Veruca Salt
- Michael "Mike D" Diamond, Adam "MCA" Yauch, and Adam "Ad-Rock" Horovitz of the Beastie Boys (Diamond is Jewish, Yauch was raised Jewish and later converted to Buddhism, and Horovitz's father was Jewish)
- Lenny Kravitz (father Sy Kravitz was a non-practicing Jew; Lenny converted to Christianity in his youth)
- Courtney Love (Sandler incorrectly says Love is half-Jewish; neither of her parents were Jewish).
- Harvey Keitel
- Jennifer Beals (an error; Beals says she once wanted to be Jewish, but is not).
- Yasmine Bleeth (her father Phil was Jewish)
- Dustin Hoffman (referred to as "Dustin Hoffmanica" for the sake of rhyme)
- O. J. Simpson, "still not a Jew"
- Scooby-Doo (voiced by Hadley Kay at the time; Kay had recently replaced Don Messick, who had originated the role from 1969 to 1996 but was not himself Jewish)
- Bob Dylan, "was born a Jew, then he wasn't, but now he's back" (The accuracy of this line is questionable; as late as 2009, Dylan reportedly still identified as a Christian, although he had also been seen in synagogues during High Holy Days around this same time period.)
- Robert Levine, husband of Mary Tyler Moore
- Tiger Woods (Mentioned, but not identified as Jewish. "No, I'm not talkin' 'bout Tiger Woods".)
- Happy Gilmore, character played by Sandler in the 1996 film of the same name
- Bruce Springsteen, who "isn't Jewish", but "my [Sandler's] mother thinks he is".
- Daryle Lamonica, who was not claimed as Jewish but was included simply because his name rhymed with Hanukkah

Other pop culture references include: Manischewitz wine, Hooked on Phonics, and Tijuana, Mexico.

== Part III (2002) ==
Included on the Eight Crazy Nights soundtrack featuring vocals from actor Rob Schneider and the children's choir The Drei-Dels.

Persons referenced in "The Chanukah Song, Part III":

- Ross (David Schwimmer) and Phoebe (Lisa Kudrow) from Friends
- David Lander (Squiggy) of Laverne & Shirley
- Debra Messing
- Melissa Gilbert (was adopted by a Jewish mother and raised in her religion)
- Michael Landon (Landon, whose father was Jewish, grew up practicing Conservative Judaism and is buried in a Jewish cemetery.)
- Jerry Lewis
- Ben Stiller (Stiller's father Jerry Stiller was Jewish, and mother Anne Meara, who was of Irish Catholic background, converted to Judaism).
- Jack Black (his father converted to Judaism, his mother was born Jewish.)
- Tom Arnold ("converted to Judaism, but you guys can have him back! Just kidding”)
- Deuce Bigalow (Rob Schneider—see note below)
- Mickey Raphael (referenced by Schneider as "The guy in Willie Nelson's band who plays harmonica")
- Osama bin Laden, who is "not a big fan of the Jews".
- Sarah Hughes (half-Jewish; "her mama's Jewish")
- Harry Houdini
- David Blaine (his mother was Jewish)
- Gwyneth Paltrow (Jewish father)
- Jennifer Connelly (Jewish mother)
- Lou Reed
- Perry Farrell
- Beck (maternal grandmother was Jewish)
- Paula Abdul
- Joey Ramone
- Natalie Portman (as "Natalie Portmanika")

Also, in an unedited version that Sandler sings at some of his comedy shows, he replaces the lyric "As for half-Jewish actors/Sean Penn is quite the great one/And Marlon Brando's not a Jew at all/But it looks to me like he ate one" with "Gwyneth Paltrow's half-Jewish/But a full-time Oscar winner/Jennifer Connelly's half-Jewish, too/And I'd like to put some more in her". While this version is not played on radio stations, the music video shows a background screen showing a picture of Sandler licking his lips as the Jennifer Connelly lyric is sung, with shocked laughter coming from the audience. This version is hidden about four minutes after the edited version on the Eight Crazy Nights soundtrack.

Although Sandler does not actually mention Schneider by name as part of the song, he mentions Deuce Bigalow, a character played by Schneider, in the lyric, "but we can do it all night long, with Deuce Bigalow" (the "you can do it" line is also a reference to Schneider's recurring "townie" character that originally appeared in The Waterboy). As Sandler mentions Bigelow, Schneider walks on stage, yells, "I'm Jewish!", and joins in for an abbreviated chorus.

Sandler and the Drei-Dels performed this version on Saturday Night Live on November 16, 2002. There, after the chorus, Schneider sings a Jewish reference for the song (Mickey Raphael, see above), using an Elvis-esque vocal tic after which, in the aired version, Sandler ad libs "tiny Elvis, ladies and gentlemen, tiny Elvis!" (a reference to an 'SNL' skit Schneider performed with Nicolas Cage; and possibly also to Elvis Presley.). In the aired version, Sandler then gives an aside of, "Schneider, I did not even know you were Jewish," to which Schneider replies, "I'm a Filipino Jew, in fact, I've gotta run home and light the first pig!" In the rehearsal version, Schneider states, "I'm a Filipino Jew." When Sandler muses, "Filipino Jew?" Schneider responds, "There are four of us." He then puts on a blonde wig and joins the "Drei-dels," the backing chorus of children, to whom he is already similarly dressed.

== Part IV (2015) ==
Sandler first performed this version at a live Judd Apatow & Friends event, part of the New York Comedy Festival, in November 2015. Lyrics can be found at the Huffington Post link here.

Persons referenced in "The Chanukah Song Part IV":

- Jesus
- Olaf (Josh Gad)
- Punky Brewster (Soleil Moon Frye)
- Judd Apatow (in original performance only)
- Scott Rudin
- "Me" (Adam Sandler)
- Joseph Gordon-Levitt
- Stan Lee
- Jake Gyllenhaal (mother is Jewish)
- The two guys who founded Google (Larry Page and Sergey Brin)
- Adam Levine
- Drake (mother is Jewish)
- Seth Rogen
- Bill Goldberg (Hulk Hogan is named at the same point in the song, but is not identified as Jewish)
- Scarlett Johansson (mother is Jewish)
- Geddy Lee
- Jonas Salk
- Harry Potter (Daniel Radcliffe)
- Jared from Subway (Jared Fogle) ("Goddammit, a Jew!")
- Dr. Drew
- Princess Leia (Carrie Fisher)
- Queen Elsa from Frozen (Idina Menzel)
- David Beckham ("a quarter chosen")
- Ron Jeremy ("fully Jewish")
- Shia LaBeouf (Jewish mother, "half a Jew")
- Ice Cream's Ben & Jerry (Ben Cohen and Jerry Greenfield)

== Covers and spoofs ==
Jimmy Fallon impersonated Adam Sandler during a Celebrity Jeopardy! sketch on Saturday Night Live on October 24, 1998. In the sketch, Fallon, as Sandler, interrupts Will Ferrell's Alex Trebek by playing guitar and singing (to the tune of the song's chorus and first few verses), "Robert De Niro, Bela Lugosi, Snuffleupagus, and Parker Posey!" (In keeping with the Celebrity Jeopardy! conceit of all of the responses being wrong, none of those people were Jews; De Niro, Lugosi and Posey were all raised Roman Catholic, and Snuffy puppeteer Jerry Nelson had no publicly known religion.)

In 2004, Jewish-Australian pop-punk band Yidcore covered it as "The Punk Rock Chanukah Song" in which they list Jews involved with punk music.

This song was covered on two different occasions for the Broadway charity albums "Carols for a Cure." In 2006, the cast of Broadway's The Wedding Singer sang the first installment of the song, led by Constantine Maroulis, and featuring help from violinist Alicia Svigals. In 2013, the song was covered once again by the cast of Soul Doctor, however this time, the lyrics covered Jewish Broadway personalities, including Mandy Patinkin, Andrew Lippa, Harvey Fierstein, Harold Prince and others. These lyrics were written by the show's Shlomo actor Eric Anderson, who himself has been pointed out in the song as "not a Jew."

In the season 3 The Office episode "Diwali", Michael Scott (Steve Carell) parodies Sandler by performing "The Diwali Song" during a Hindu Diwali festival.

In 2008, Unitarian-Universalist Evan Austin performed a parody of this song called "The Chalica Song" about the Unitarian-Universalist holiday of Chalica. Austin lists celebrities and historical persons who are "Unitarian-Universalists. Or Unitarians. Or Universalists. Or people with similar ideas." In 2009, Austin recorded "The (Second) Chalica Song" with the same tune, but a new list of names.

In 2009, a cover of the song by Neil Diamond was released on A Cherry Cherry Christmas. This version featured several changes in lyrics, including the change from "Tom Cruise isn't but I heard his agent is" to "Tom Cruise isn't, but Jesus Christ is".

On a 2014 episode of Robot Chicken, Sandler appears in a sketch on how to spell "Chanukah", singing a brief snippet of the song describing how Angelina Jolie is not a Jew.

In 2021, rock band Haim posted a brief cover on Twitter and Instagram, with lyrics covering Maya Rudolph (Jewish father), Michelle Zauner (referred to by her band Japanese Breakfast), Aaron and Bryce Dessner, Rashida and Kidada Jones (Jewish mother), Eugene and Dan Levy, Doja Cat (Jewish mother), Timothée Chalamet (Jewish mother), and Stephen Sondheim. Sandler gave his blessing to the revisions and others like it, noting that the large number of famous Jews would warrant many more versions of the song than Sandler could write himself and it would be unfair to limit the song to the list originally mentioned.

== See also ==
- "The Thanksgiving Song"
