= Adam Sandler =

American comedian and actor (born 1966)

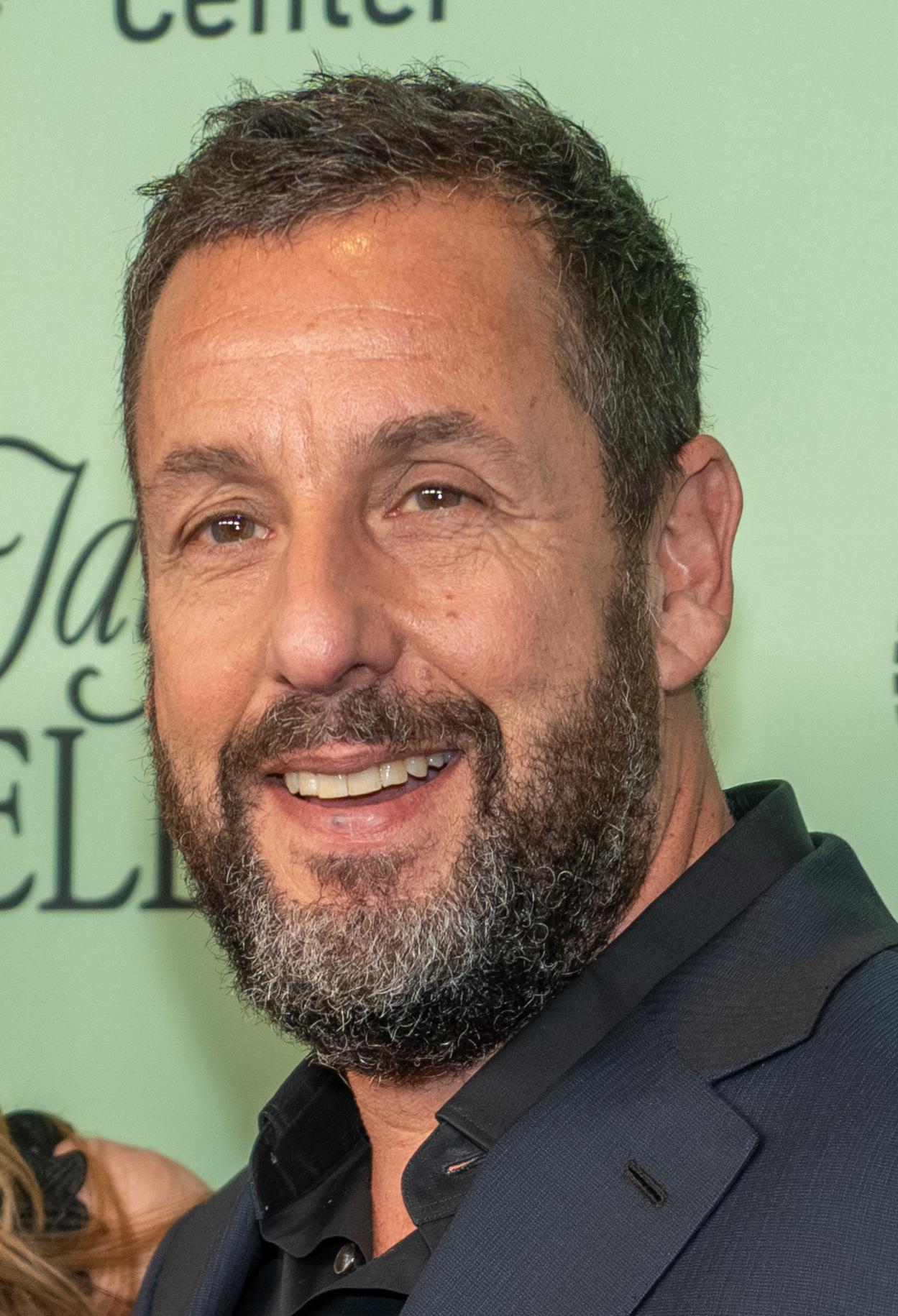
- Sandler in New York City in 2025
- Born: Adam Richard Sandler; September 9, 1966 (age 60); New York City, U.S.
- Education: New York University (BFA)
- Occupations: Comedian; actor; producer; writer
- Years active: 1987–present
- Works: Filmography
- Spouse: Jackie Titone (m. 2003)
- Children: Sadie; Sunny
- Awards: Full list

Comedy career
- Medium: Stand-up; film; television; music
- Genres: Observational comedy; surreal humor; blue comedy; musical comedy; sketch comedy; satire
- Subjects: American culture; Jewish culture; popular culture; sexuality; current events

Adam Richard Sandler (born September 9, 1966) is an American comedian, actor, producer and writer. Primarily a comedic leading actor in films, his accolades include an Independent Spirit Award, alongside nominations for an Actor Award, three Golden Globes, three Grammy Awards, and seven Primetime Emmy Awards. In 2023, Sandler was awarded the Mark Twain Prize for American Humor.

Sandler was a cast member on the NBC sketch comedy series Saturday Night Live from 1990 to 1995. His return to Saturday Night Live as a host in 2019 earned him a Primetime Emmy Award nomination. Sandler gained further stardom starring in a string of successful Hollywood studio comedy films that have cumulatively grossed over $2 billion worldwide. These films include Billy Madison (1995), Happy Gilmore (1996), The Waterboy (1998), The Wedding Singer (1998), Big Daddy (1999), Mr. Deeds (2002), Anger Management (2003), 50 First Dates (2004), The Longest Yard (2005), Click (2006), I Now Pronounce You Chuck & Larry (2007), You Don't Mess with the Zohan (2008), Grown Ups (2010), Just Go with It (2011), Jack and Jill (2011), Grown Ups 2 (2013) and Blended (2014).

Sandler had an estimated net worth of $420 million in 2020, and in 2021, signed a new four-movie deal with Netflix worth over $250 million. He starred in the Netflix films The Ridiculous 6 (2015), The Do-Over (2016), Sandy Wexler (2017), The Week Of (2018), Murder Mystery (2019), Hubie Halloween (2020), Murder Mystery 2 (2023), and Happy Gilmore 2 (2025). Sandler also voiced Dracula in the first three films of the Hotel Transylvania franchise (2012–2018). He has also received praise for his dramatic roles in Punch-Drunk Love (2002), Reign Over Me (2007), The Meyerowitz Stories (2017), Uncut Gems (2019), Hustle (2022), Spaceman (2024) and Jay Kelly (2025).

== Early life ==
Adam Richard Sandler was born in Brooklyn, New York City, on September 9, 1966, to Judith "Judy" (née Levine), a nursery school teacher, and Stanley Sandler, an electrical engineer. He has three older siblings: Scott, Elizabeth, and Valerie. His family is Jewish and descends from Russian Jewish immigrants on both sides. Sandler grew up in Manchester, New Hampshire, after his family moved there when he was six years old. He attended Manchester Central High School. As a teen, Sandler was in BBYO, a Jewish youth group. He graduated from New York University's Tisch School of the Arts in 1988 with a bachelor's degree in acting.

== Career ==
=== 1987–1994: Early television and film roles ===
In 1987, Sandler played Theo Huxtable's friend Smitty on The Cosby Show and the Stud Boy or Trivia Delinquent on the MTV game show Remote Control. After his film debut in Going Overboard in 1989, Sandler performed in comedy clubs, having first taken the stage at his brother's urging when he was 17. He was discovered by comedian Dennis Miller, who caught Sandler's act in Los Angeles and recommended him to Saturday Night Live producer Lorne Michaels. Sandler was hired as a writer for SNL in 1990, and became a featured player the following year. He made a name for himself by performing amusing original songs on the show, including "The Thanksgiving Song" and "The Chanukah Song". Sandler told Conan O'Brien on The Tonight Show that NBC fired him and Chris Farley from the show in 1995. Sandler used his firing as part of his monologue when he returned in 2019 to host the show.

In 1993, Adam Sandler appeared in the film Coneheads with fellow SNL performers Farley, David Spade, Dan Aykroyd, Phil Hartman, and Jane Curtin. In 1994, he co-starred in Airheads with Brendan Fraser and Steve Buscemi.

=== 1995–2014: Commercial success ===
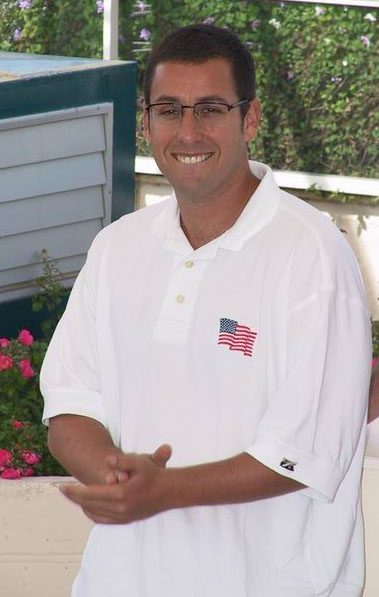
Sandler at the 2002 Cannes Film Festival

Sandler starred in Billy Madison (1995) playing a grown man repeating grades 1–12 to earn back his father's respect and the right to inherit his father's multimillion-dollar hotel empire. The film was successful at the box office despite negative reviews. He followed this film with Bulletproof (1996), and the financially successful comedies Happy Gilmore (1996) and The Wedding Singer (1998), his first collaboration with Drew Barrymore. He was initially cast in the bachelor party-themed comedy/thriller Very Bad Things (1998) but had to back out due to his involvement in The Waterboy (1998), one of his first big hits.

According to Billy Madison director Tamra Davis, Sandler told her in advance of the film's dodgeball scene that he planned to throw the balls hard and genuinely hurt the children. He did so, with parental permission, and she described the resulting scene as "a full-on assault" adding that every shot needed to be cut because the children were crying.

Sandler continued making successful comedy films including Big Daddy (1999), Mr. Deeds (2002), Anger Management (2003), 50 First Dates (2004, his second collaboration with Drew Barrymore), The Longest Yard (2005), and Click (2006). He also formed his film production company, Happy Madison Productions, in 1999, first producing fellow SNL alumnus Rob Schneider's film Deuce Bigalow: Male Gigolo. The company has produced most of Sandler's subsequent films to date, and is on the Sony/Columbia Pictures lot in Culver City, California. Most of its films have received negative reviews from critics, with three considered among the worst ever made yet most have performed well at the box office.

Although his earlier commercially successful films did not receive favorable critical attention, Sandler started to receive more positive reviews beginning with his more dramatic role in Punch-Drunk Love in 2002. Punch-Drunk Love's writer and director, Paul Thomas Anderson, had an "obsession-level" love for Sandler's previous movies and wrote the film with him in mind. Sandler was intimidated to work with Anderson after viewing his previous film Magnolia (1999), but these fears were alleviated when he received the script from Anderson. Roger Ebert's review of Punch-Drunk Love concluded that Sandler had been wasted in earlier films with poorly written scripts and characters with no development. Ebert noted that Sandler's character still maintained the "childlike, love-starved" persona from his previous films, but was shown in a new light as the "key to all Adam Sandler films". Sandler was nominated for a Golden Globe Award for Best Actor – Motion Picture Musical or Comedy for his performance. The film marked the beginning of Sandler moving outside the genre of slapstick comedy to take on more serious roles, such as Mike Binder's Reign Over Me (2007), a drama about a man who loses his entire family in the September 11 attacks and then struggles to rekindle a friendship with his old college roommate (Don Cheadle).

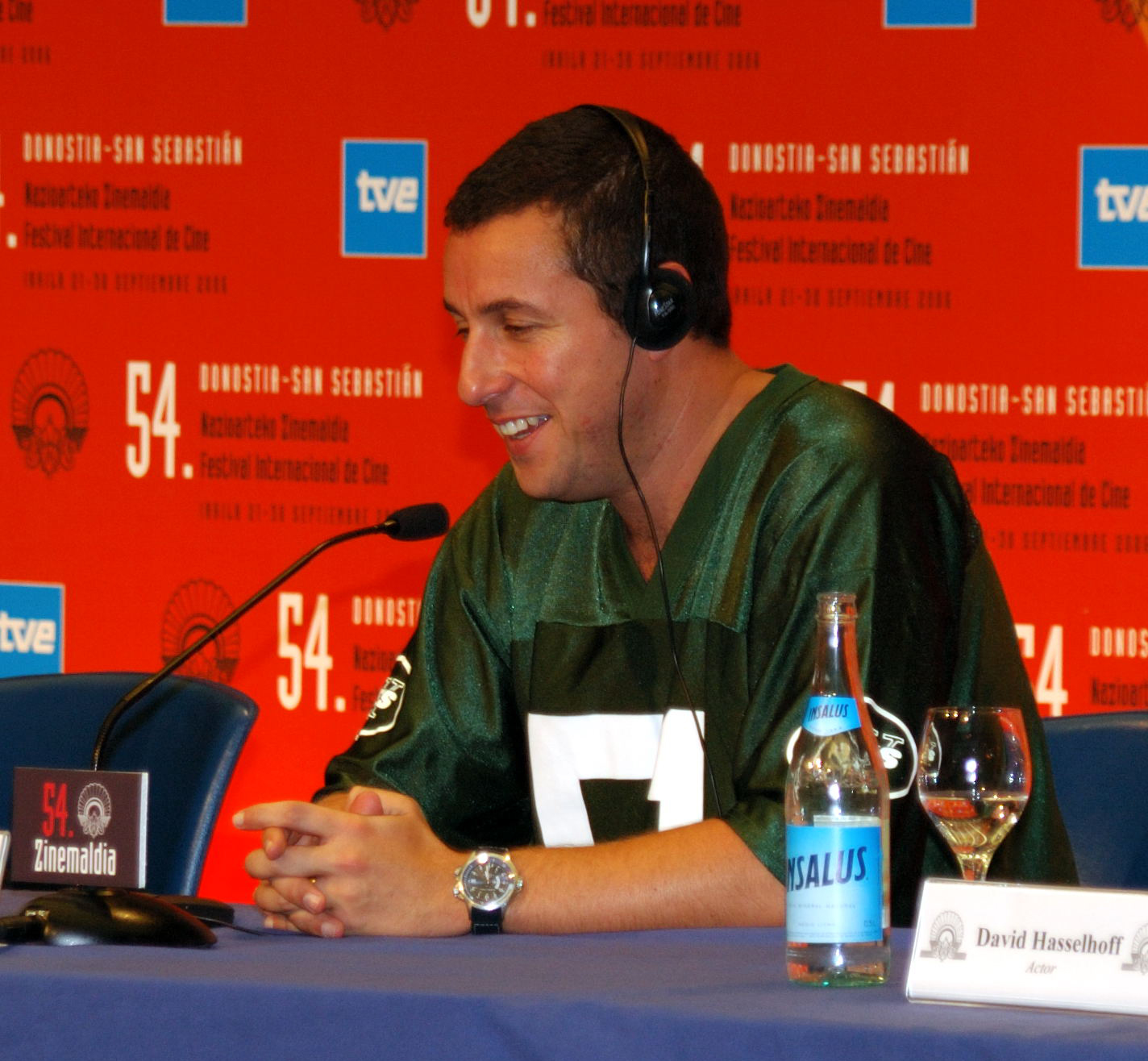
Sandler at a press conference for Click in 2005

Sandler starred alongside friend Kevin James in the film I Now Pronounce You Chuck and Larry (2007), and headlined You Don't Mess with the Zohan (2008). The latter was written by Sandler, Judd Apatow, and Robert Smigel, and directed by Dennis Dugan. That same year, Sandler starred along with Keri Russell and English comedian Russell Brand in Adam Shankman's children's fantasy film Bedtime Stories (2008), as a stressed hotel maintenance worker whose bedtime stories he reads to his niece and nephew begin to come true. It marked Sandler's first family film and first film under the Disney banner.

In 2009, Sandler starred in Apatow's third directorial feature, Funny People, a comedy drama about a famous comedian (Sandler) with a terminal illness. The film was released on July 31, 2009. After its release, Funny People and Punch-Drunk Love were cited in the June 2010 announcement that Sandler was one of 135 people (including 20 actors) invited to join the Academy of Motion Picture Arts and Sciences.

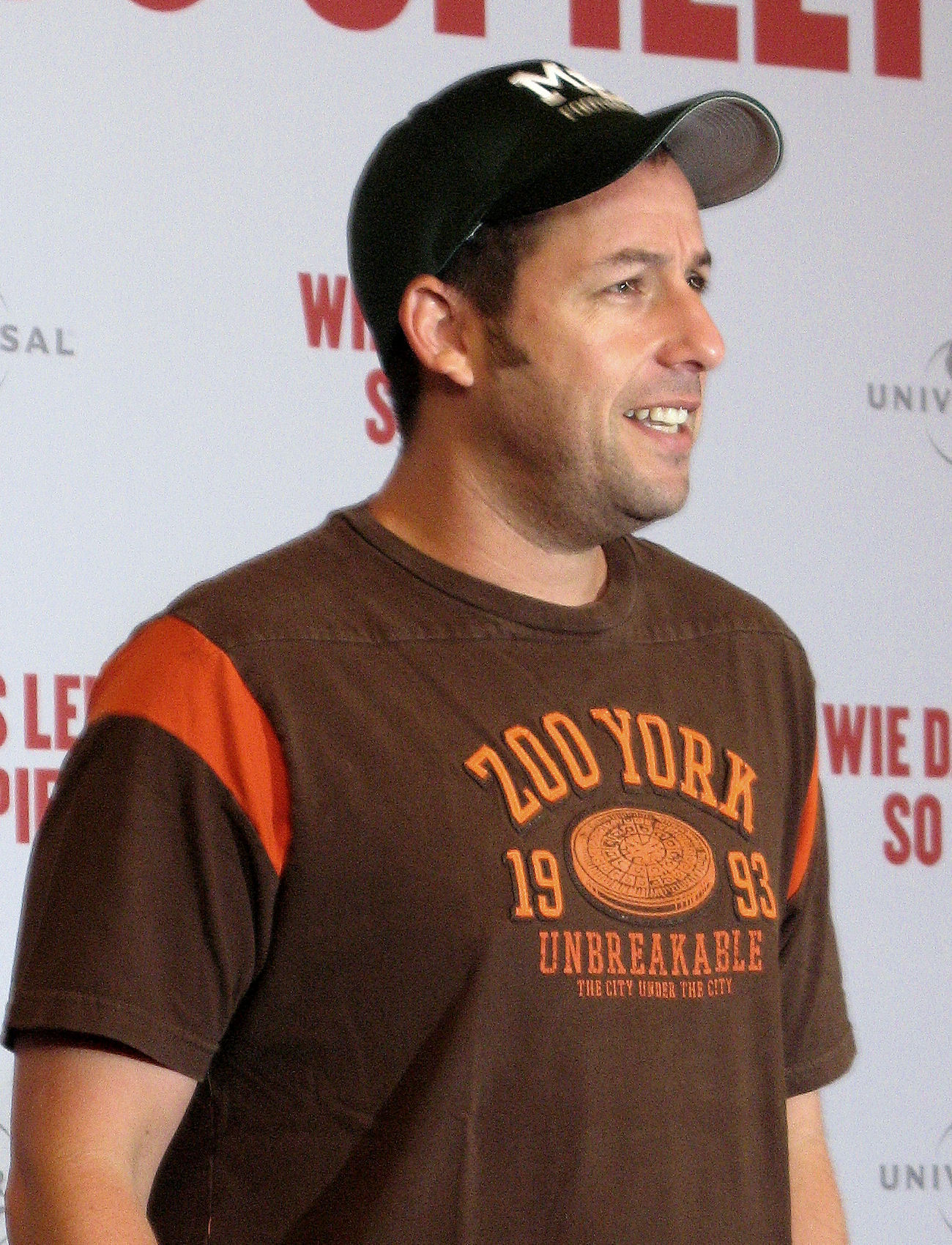
Sandler in Berlin in 2009

In 2010, Sandler appeared in Grown Ups, alongside Kevin James, Chris Rock, Rob Schneider, David Spade, Salma Hayek, Maria Bello, and Maya Rudolph. Sandler and Dickie Roberts scribe Fred Wolf wrote the script and Dennis Dugan directed. Sandler's later comedy films, including Grown Ups and Grown Ups 2, received largely negative reviews. Reviewing the latter, critic Mark Olsen of the Los Angeles Times remarked that Sandler had become the antithesis of Judd Apatow; he was instead "the white Tyler Perry: smart enough to know better, savvy enough to do it anyway, lazy enough not to care." In 2011, Sandler starred with Jennifer Aniston in the romantic comedy film Just Go with It. He also voiced a capuchin monkey in Kevin James's Zookeeper, released on July 8, 2011. In 2012, he starred in That's My Boy, as a man who fathered a son (Andy Samberg) with his teacher (Eva Amurri) in high school. In 2013, he guest starred in the Disney Channel Original Series Jessie as himself in the episode "Punched Dumped Love". He and Jessie star Cameron Boyce had worked together in Grown Ups and Grown Ups 2; Sandler's 2020 film Hubie Halloween was dedicated to Boyce's memory. Sandler next reunited with Drew Barrymore for a third time in the Warner Bros. romantic comedy Blended, which was filmed in South Africa and released on May 23, 2014.

=== 2014–present: Final theatrical films and switch to Netflix ===
In October 2014, Netflix announced a four-movie deal with Sandler and Happy Madison Productions. Also that year, Sandler co-starred in the drama film Men, Women & Children, directed by Jason Reitman. He was considered for the voice of Rocket Raccoon in Marvel's Guardians of the Galaxy but Bradley Cooper was cast instead.

In 2015, Sandler released his last theatrical film, Pixels, based on French director Patrick Jean's 2010 short film of the same name, before transitioning into a distribution deal with Netflix.

Sandler's first original film for Netflix was the Western comedy film The Ridiculous 6. Despite being universally panned by critics, on January 6, 2016, it was announced by Netflix that the film had been viewed more times in 30 days than any other movie in Netflix history. Sandler also starred in another Netflix film in 2016, titled The Do-Over.

Sandler starred in the 2017 Netflix film Sandy Wexler, in which he plays a talent manager who falls in love with one of his clients. He returned to dramatic territory in 2017 with Noah Baumbach's family drama The Meyerowitz Stories. In the film, Sandler plays Danny Meyerowitz, who is unemployed and separated from his wife, and who is experiencing dysfunctional relationships with his brother (Ben Stiller), his sister (Elizabeth Marvel), and his father (Dustin Hoffman). The film premiered in competition for the Palme d'Or at the 2017 Cannes Film Festival where his performance received favorable notices from critics. Peter Debruge, film critic for Variety, wrote of his performance, "With no shtick to fall back on, Sandler is forced to act, and it's a glorious thing to watch".

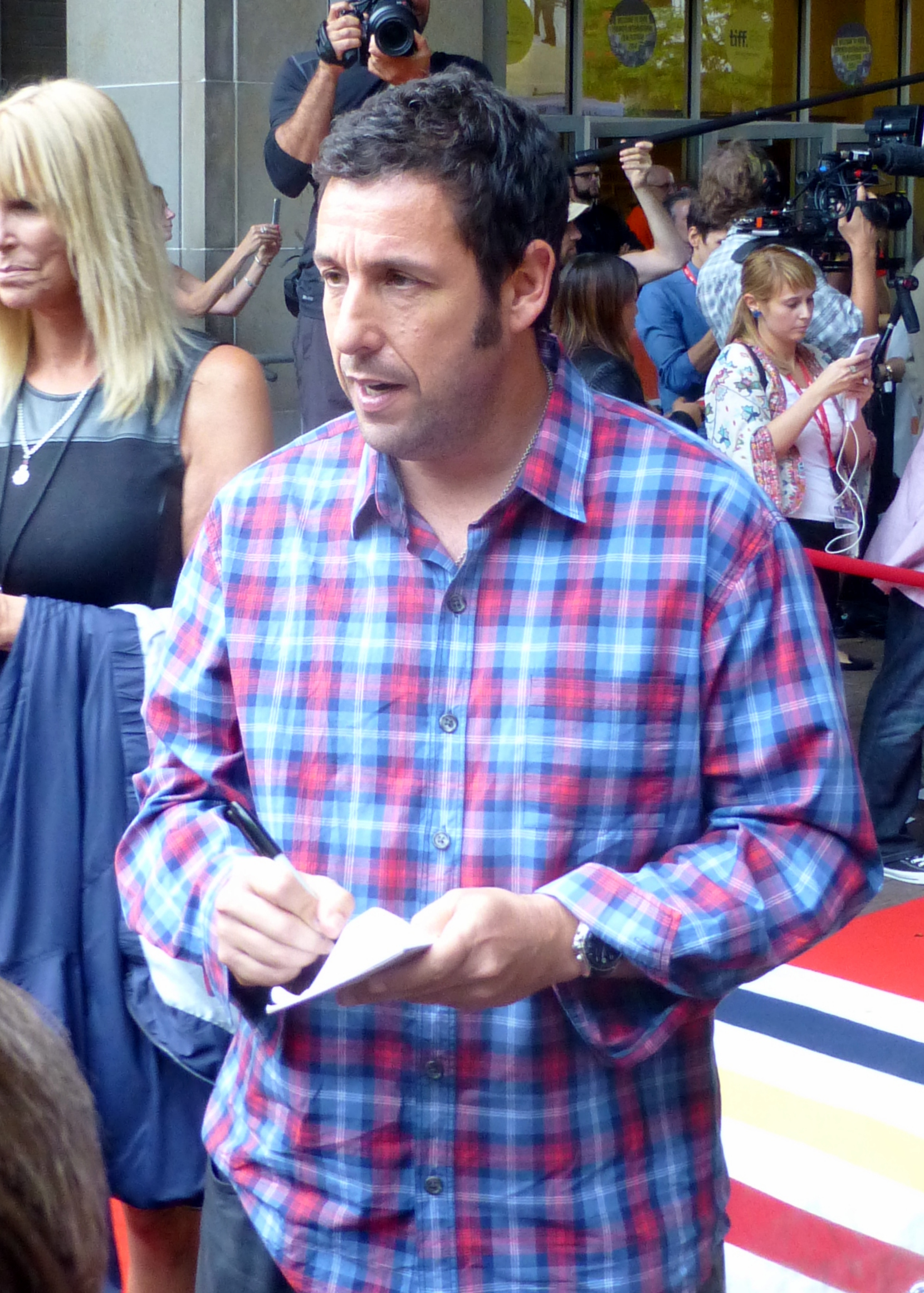
Sandler at the 2014 Toronto International Film Festival, for the premiere of Men, Women & Children

In 2018, Sandler starred in the Netflix film The Week Of alongside Chris Rock. He also starred in a Netflix stand-up special Adam Sandler: 100% Fresh, which was part of his company's Netflix deal and marked his first stand-up film in over two decades. The special was directed by longtime collaborator Steven Brill, while portions of the special were filmed by Paul Thomas Anderson, which marked Sandler's first project with Anderson since Punch-Drunk Love sixteen years prior.

On May 4, 2019, Sandler made his first appearance as host of Saturday Night Live, ending the episode with a tribute to his friend and fellow former cast member Chris Farley. Sandler received a Primetime Emmy Award for Outstanding Guest Actor in a Comedy Series nomination for his hosting stint. In June 2019, he reunited with Jennifer Aniston in the Netflix film Murder Mystery, which broke the record for the biggest opening weekend in the company's history, and spawned a sequel, Murder Mystery 2, in 2023.

In December 2019, Sandler starred in the crime thriller Uncut Gems, directed by the Safdie brothers. The movie and Sandler's acting received critical acclaim and many end-of-year awards from critics, who noted this role as a career best for Sandler, for which he earned the Independent Spirit Award for Best Male Lead.

In January 2020, Netflix announced a new four-movie deal with Happy Madison Productions worth up to $275 million. Sandler starred in and wrote the 2020 Netflix film Hubie Halloween. In addition he voiced Leo the lizard in Netflix's animated coming-of-age musical Leo (2023).

Sandler produced and starred in the 2022 sports drama film Hustle, which received critical acclaim. His performance in the film was repeatedly singled out for praise and he received a nomination for a Screen Actors Guild Award. On March 19, 2023, Sandler was awarded the Kennedy Center's Mark Twain Prize for American Humor. Many of Sandler's friends and fellow performers, including Ben Stiller, Conan O'Brien, Dana Carvey, and Judd Apatow, spoke at the event.

In 2024, Sandler starred in his second Netflix stand-up comedy special, Adam Sandler: Love You, which was directed by Josh Safdie. He also starred in the science fiction drama film Spaceman, an adaptation of the science fiction novel Spaceman of Bohemia (2017), directed by Johan Renck.

Also in 2024, Sandler was named the People's Choice Icon at the 49th People's Choice Awards. In March 2024, Forbes announced that Sandler was the best-paid actor in Hollywood in 2023, earning $73 million.

In 2025, Sandler reprised his role as the titular character in Happy Gilmore 2, released nearly 30 years following the original film in 1996, and reportedly accruing over 90 million viewers via Netflix following its release. He also appeared alongside George Clooney in the drama Jay Kelly, for which both Clooney and Sandler received praise, particularly Sandler on expanding his dramatic range in the film, and nominations at the 83rd Golden Globe Awards.

On December 3, 2025, it was announced that Sandler would join Season 23 of Variety Studio: Actors on Actors alongside Ariana Grande.

== Public image ==
Sandler has been referenced multiple times in various media, including in the TV shows The Simpsons, in the episode "Monty Can't Buy Me Love", in the Family Guy episode "Stew-Roids", and in the South Park episode "You're Getting Old". He was also referenced in the video game Half-Life: Opposing Force. The HBO series Animals episode "The Trial" features a mock court case to decide whether Sandler or Jim Carrey is a better comedian.

In 2021, Vogue named Sandler the year's fashion icon for popularizing a "grocery-run look", characterized by oversized T-shirts, XXL pants, and Nike sneakers dubbed as "Adam Sandler style". Menswear brand Old Jewish Men sells a line of basketball shorts inspired by the style. Speaking on the title with Esquire, Sandler remarked: "It took a while. I was working that angle for years. For a while I was like, 'Please accept me and the way I dress.' And 30 years later, they finally came around."

== Personal life ==
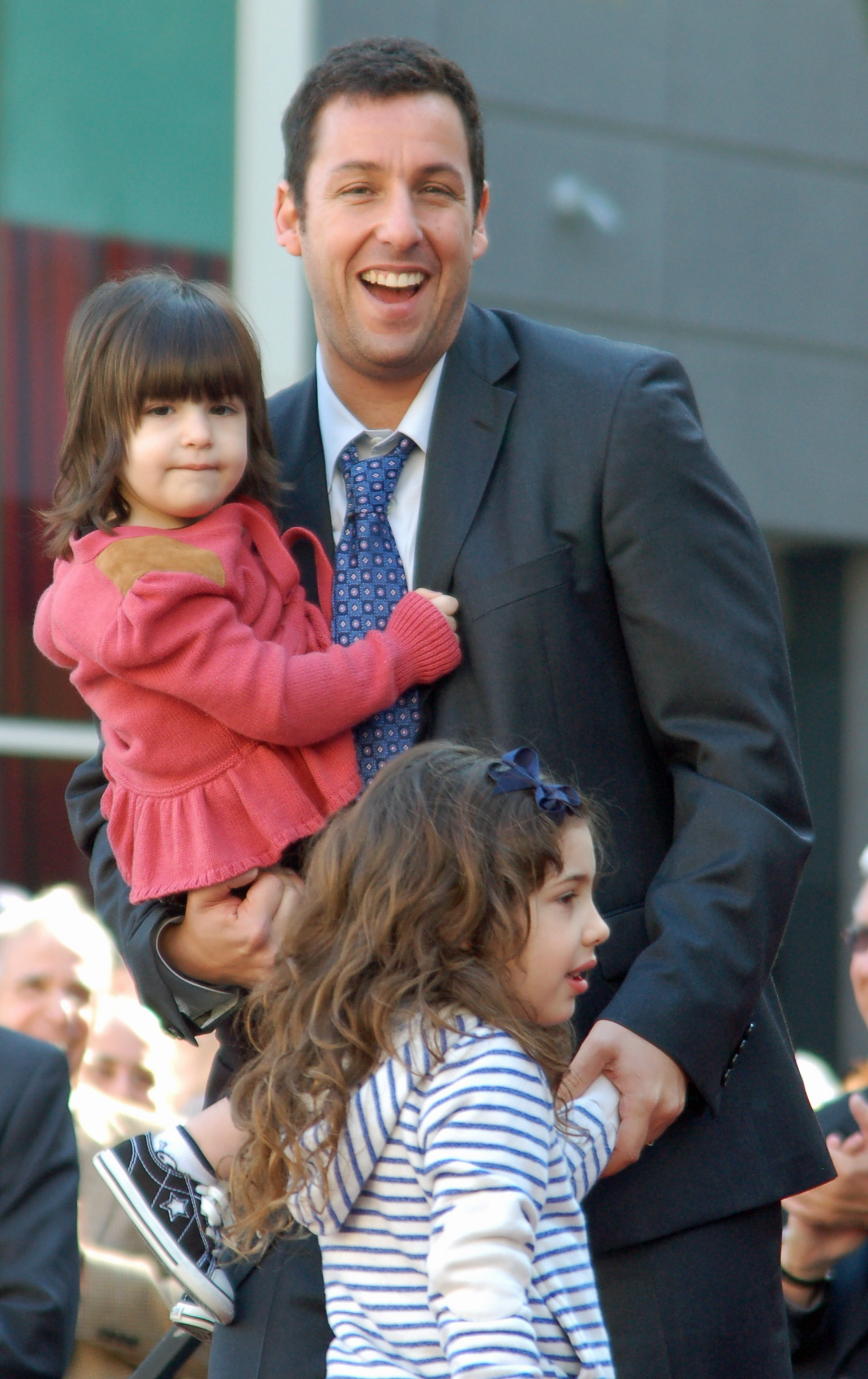
Sandler with his two daughters, Sunny and Sadie, in February 2011, at a ceremony for receiving a star on the Hollywood Walk of Fame

Sandler has been married to Jacqueline "Jackie" Sandler (née Titone) since 2003. She converted to Sandler's religion, Judaism. The couple has two daughters, Sadie (born May 2006) and Sunny (born November 2008). Sandler is the son-in-law of politician Joseph H. Titone. Sandler's wife and children often appear in his films. Both Sadie and Sunny have each appeared in at least two of the Hotel Transylvania movie series. Adam's nephew Jared has also been featured in his films, such as Pixels and Home Team.

Sandler's love for basketball and his skill at its street version has been widely reported. Sandler frequently seeks out pick-up games when traveling and touring, and people who have played with him call out Sandler's creative passes to teammates. He has suffered two major injuries while playing, including a broken ankle and a shoulder injury that required surgery. He is also known for the baggy clothing he wears while playing.

In 2007, Sandler made a $1 million donation to the Boys & Girls Clubs of America in Manchester, New Hampshire.

Sandler has not publicly discussed his political opinions, but it has been reported that in the past he was a registered Republican. He performed at the 2004 Republican National Convention, and donated $2,100 to Rudy Giuliani's 2008 presidential campaign.

== Acting credits and accolades ==
Sandler's accolades include an Independent Spirit Award for Best Male Lead, six MTV Movie & TV Awards, and nine People's Choice Awards. He has also been nominated for three Golden Globe Awards, three Grammy Awards, five Primetime Emmy Awards, and a Screen Actors Guild Award.

== Discography ==
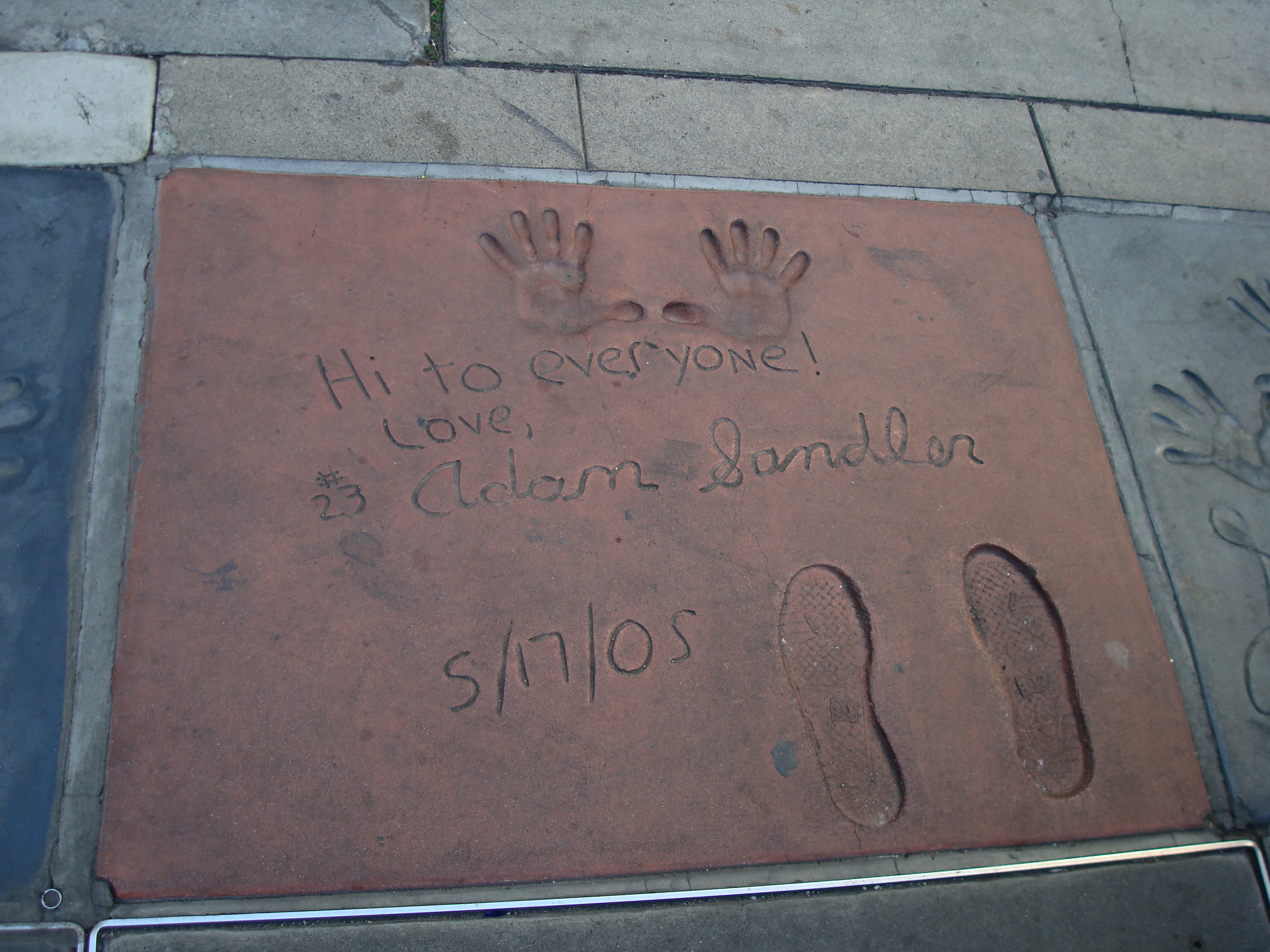
Sandler's handprints and shoeprints in front of Grauman's Chinese Theatre, 2008

=== Studio albums ===
List of albums, with selected chart positions and certifications
Title	Album details	Peak chart positions				Certifications
Title	Album details	US	US Com.	AUS	CAN	Certifications
They're All Gonna Laugh at You!	Released: September 28, 1993 (US); Label: Warner Bros.; Format: LP	129	7	—	—	RIAA: 2× Platinum; MC: Gold
What the Hell Happened to Me?	Released: February 13, 1996; Label: Warner Bros.; Format: LP	18	7	—	—	RIAA: 2× Platinum; MC: Platinum
What's Your Name?	Released: September 16, 1997; Label: Warner Bros.; Format: LP	18	—	—	—	RIAA: Gold
Stan and Judy's Kid	Released: September 21, 1999; Label: Warner Bros.; Format: LP	16	—	89	20	RIAA: Gold
Shhh...Don't Tell	Released: July 13, 2004; Label: Warner Bros.; Format: LP, digital download	47	11	—	—	

"The Peeper" was made into a flash cartoon, launched over the 1999 Labor Day weekend as a promotion for Stan and Judy's Kid and was watched by over 1 million users during that period, one of the most-watched video clips on the internet at the time.

In 2009 Sandler contributed the Neil Young cover "Like a Hurricane" to Covered, A Revolution in Sound as part of Warner Brothers 50th Anniversary celebrations; the song was performed on the David Letterman Show with a band that included, among others, Waddy Wachtel, who has appeared with Sandler on a number of occasions.

=== Soundtrack albums ===
Title	Album details	Peak chart positions
Title	Album details	US Com.
Eight Crazy Nights (Original Movie Soundtrack)	Released: November 27, 2002; Label: Sony; Format: Digital download, streaming, LP, CD	—
Adam Sandler: 100% Fresh	Released: March 22, 2019; Label: Netflix, Warner; Format: Digital download, streaming, LP, CD	1
Leo (Soundtrack from the Netflix Film)	Released: November 21, 2023; Label: Netflix; Format: Digital download, streaming	—
Adam Sandler: Love You	Released: August 27, 2024; Label: Netflix, Warner; Format: Digital download, streaming, LP, CD	—

=== Singles ===
List of singles, with selected chart positions and certifications
Title	Year	Peak chart positions					Certifications	Album
Title	Year	US	US Adult Pop	US Hol.	US Main. Rock	US Mod. Rock	Certifications	Album
"The Thanksgiving Song"	1993	—	40	23	29	29		They're All Gonna Laugh at You!
"The Chanukah Song"	1996	80	28	20	20	25	RIAA: Gold	What the Hell Happened to Me?
"Secret"	2004	—	—	—	—	—		Shhh... Don't Tell
"Like a Hurricane"	2008	—	—	—	—	—		Covered, A Revolution in Sound
"Phone Wallet Keys"	2018	—	—	—	—	—		100% Fresh
"Farley"	2018	—	—	—	—	—		100% Fresh

== Comedy tours ==
- What the Hell Happened to Me (1996)
- The College Tour (1997)
- The Do-Over Tour (2016)
- Here Comes the Funny Tour (2016–2018)
- 100% Fresher (2019)
- Live 2022–2023
- I Missed You Tour (2023)
- You're My Best Friend Tour (2025)
