= The Thanksgiving Song =

1992 song performed by Adam Sandler

"The Thanksgiving Song" (also known as "Happy Thanksgiving") is a song performed by Adam Sandler discussing Thanksgiving. He wrote the song with Ian Maxtone-Graham and Robert Smigel.

== History ==
It was first performed during the Weekend Update segment of the season 18 episode of Saturday Night Live on November 21, 1992, as a duet between Sandler and Weekend Update anchor Kevin Nealon; it was originally intended to be a recurring Thanksgiving tradition with other cast members debuting their own original songs, but the next year, it was again Sandler, doing another version of the same song in the style of Bruce Springsteen. A live performance of the original song was recorded at The Strand in Redondo Beach, California on July 25, 1993. It was also featured on MTV's Beavis and Butt-Head Do Thanksgiving in 1997 The version at The Strand was included on Sandler's debut album They're All Gonna Laugh at You! and was released as a single.

== Song details ==
The song, which Sandler sings in a childlike, semi-falsetto voice, primarily revolves around the repetition of the word "turkey" in various two-line rhymes, many of which are non sequiturs; for instance, "Turkey with gravy and cranberries/Can't believe the Mets traded Darryl Strawberry!" Celebrity and pop culture references include:

=== Original version ===
- Betty Grable
- 50,000,000 Elvis Fans Can't Be Wrong
- Turkey-related drowsiness
- Jimmie Walker's portrayal of J. J. Evans and his catch phrase "Dyn-o-mite!"
- Darryl Strawberry's departure from the New York Mets (Sandler erroneously refers to Strawberry being traded; in fact, Strawberry left as a free agent and signed with the Los Angeles Dodgers).
- Mike Tyson raping Desiree Washington
- Lake Winnipesaukee (SNL version only)
- Cheryl Tiegs posters (1993 recordings onward; a reference to Sandler's Canteen Boy character, who had a crush on Tiegs)
- Sammy Davis Jr. having only one eye
- Corduroy pants
- Mopeds

=== 1993 "Bruce Springsteen" version ===
- Roller skating
- 1965 Chevrolet
- Tide and Cheer
- Venus Flytrap on WKRP
- George Wendt
- Sprint and MCI
- Sigourney Weaver
- John and Lorena Bobbitt

== Legacy ==
The song is a predecessor to Sandler's more popular holiday song, "The Chanukah Song" (also co-written by Maxtone-Graham and Sandler). When "The Chanukah Song" became a hit on the rock charts (and a minor hit on the Hot 100) in 1996, "The Thanksgiving Song" was released as a follow-up the next year; it too became a hit, charting at #40 on the Adult Top 40 chart and #29 on the Mainstream Rock Tracks chart in 1997. The song continues to receive extensive radio airplay around Thanksgiving, on various formats, both with other holiday-themed songs and without. Its popularity on Thanksgiving radio is surpassed only by the Arlo Guthrie song "Alice's Restaurant;" certain stations play both as a Thanksgiving tradition. Various radio cuts remove or edit one verse which states "my brother likes to masturbate with baby oil" but it is otherwise identical to the live performance at The Strand. The edits also leave in a portion of the performance where Sandler has to stop in the middle of a song due to becoming distracted with the audience's rhythmic clapping.
