= What the Hell Happened to Me? =

Studio album by Adam Sandler
- Released: February 13, 1996
- Genre: Comedy
- Length: 74:51
- Label: Warner Bros.
- Producers: Brooks Arthur; Adam Sandler

Adam Sandler chronology
They're All Gonna Laugh at You! (1993)	What the Hell Happened to Me? (1996)	What's Your Name? (1997)

What the Hell Happened to Me? is the second studio album by Adam Sandler, released by Warner Bros. on 13 February 1996. It contains the official recording of "The Chanukah Song" (recorded live at University of California, Santa Barbara), which has become a holiday staple and one of Sandler's best-known works. It reached No. 80 on the Billboard Hot 100 and #25 on the US Modern Rock charts. It spent 57 weeks on the Billboard 200 chart and peaked at No. 18. It has been certified double-platinum, and as of 2011, has sold over 2,124,000 copies in the US, making it the best-selling comedy album since Nielsen SoundScan began tracking sales in 1991.

Sandler went on a 21-day US tour to support the album, complete with a live backing band, including guitarist Waddy Wachtel. The live performance from June 29, 1996, in the style of a rock concert, was aired as an hour long special on HBO, complete with covers of Foghat's "I Just Want to Make Love to You" and Bruce Springsteen's "Out in the Street", as well as a previously unreleased Halloween song, with a special appearance from fellow Saturday Night Live alum Chris Farley, as well as songs from Sandler's tenure at SNL, and cuts from the album and Sandler's first album, They're All Gonna Laugh at You!. The concert has since been uploaded to YouTube, where it has received 156 million views since March 2017. The success of the tour and HBO special also led to Sandler's next album, the mostly-songs What's Your Name?, in 1997.

Professional ratings
Review scores
Source	Rating
Allmusic	link

== Track listing ==
No.	Title	Length
1.	"Joining the Cult"	2:52
2.	"Respect"	4:34
3.	"**Ode to My Car**"	3:55
4.	"The Excited Southerner Orders a Meal"	0:45
5.	"The Goat"	8:51
6.	"**The Chanukah Song**"	3:44
7.	"The Excited Southerner Gets Pulled Over"	1:04
8.	"The Hypnotist"	8:02
9.	"**Steve Polychronopolous**"	3:11
10.	"The Excited Southerner at a Job Interview"	1:10
11.	"Do It for Your Mama"	5:23
12.	"**Crazy Love**"	3:56
13.	"The Excited Southerner Meets Mel Gibson"	1:08
14.	"The Adventures of the Cow"	5:04
15.	"**Dip Doodle**"	3:48
16.	"The Excited Southerner Proposes to a Woman"	1:03
17.	"Memory Lane"	2:43
18.	"**Mr. Bake-O**"	4:06
19.	"Sex or Weight Lifting"	7:06
20.	"**What the Hell Happened to Me?**"	2:26
Total length:		74:51

All tracks in bold are songs.

== Featured personnel ==
- Adam Sandler – All Tracks
- Allen Covert – Tracks 1, 2, 10, 17, 19
- Frank Coraci – Tracks 2, 11, 13, 14, 17, 19
- Judd Apatow – Tracks 7, 11, 17, 19

== Charts ==
=== Weekly charts ===
Chart (1996)	Peak position
US Billboard 200	18
US Top Catalog Albums (Billboard)	17
Canada Top Albums/CDs (RPM)	30

=== Year-end charts ===
Chart (1996)	Position
US Billboard 200	78

=== Songs chart positions ===
Title	Year	Peak chart positions		Certifications
Title	Year	Hot 100	Adult Pop	Certifications
"The Chanukah Song"	1996	80	28	RIAA: Gold

== Certifications ==
Region	Certification	Certified units/sales
Canada (Music Canada)	Platinum	100,000^{^}
United States (RIAA)	2× Platinum	2,000,000^{^}
^{^} Shipments figures based on certification alone.
