= Bulletproof (1996 film) =

- Theatrical release poster
- Directed by: Ernest Dickerson
- Screenplay by: Joe Gayton; Lewis Colick
- Story by: Joe Gayton
- Produced by: Robert Simonds
- Starring: Damon Wayans; Adam Sandler; James Farentino; James Caan
- Cinematography: Steven Bernstein
- Edited by: George Folsey, Jr.
- Music by: Elmer Bernstein
- Production companies: Brillstein-Grey Entertainment; Robert Simonds Productions; Gold/Miller Productions
- Distributed by: Universal Pictures
- Release date: September 6, 1996
- Running time: 84 minutes
- Country: United States
- Language: English
- Box office: $22.6 million

Bulletproof is a 1996 American buddy cop action comedy film directed by Ernest Dickerson and starring Damon Wayans, Adam Sandler, James Farentino and James Caan.

Released theatrically in the United States by Universal Pictures on September 6, 1996, Bulletproof was panned by critics and grossed $22.6 million worldwide.

== Plot ==
Archie Moses is a small-time thief in Los Angeles who smuggles drugs for drug lord Frank Colton, who launders his drug money through a car dealership. Moses is unaware that his best friend, Rock Keats, is actually LAPD undercover cop Jack Carter, who befriended him to infiltrate Colton's gang.

Carter has Moses include him in Colton's next drug shipment, secretly planning to arrest Colton and take in Moses, whom he has come to care about, unharmed. Carter's undercover status is revealed before he can enact his plan, however, a hurt Moses pulls a gun on him. During the raid on Colton's warehouse, an out of control crane hits Moses in the back, causing him to accidentally shoot Carter in the head. He then flees the state, and is subsequently found and arrested.

Carter miraculously survives and makes a full recovery with the aid of his physical therapist, Dr. Traci Flynn, with whom he falls in love. Moses is brought into custody, and he agrees to testify against Colton, but the trial is set to take place at the other side of the country. Carter's superior officer, Capt. Jensen, orders him to personally transfer Moses to the courtroom.

Carter harbors resentment against Moses, and tensions escalate once the simple transfer goes awry. Colton learns through bribed federal agents and LAPD officers of Moses' attempt to testify against him. As they flee from Colton's men, Carter and Moses slowly mend their friendship, and are successful in returning to Carter's precinct. However, Colton apparently holds Flynn hostage, and blackmails Carter into turning Moses over to save Flynn.

Carter and Moses pretend to comply with Colton, and shoot their way through Colton's guards. It is later revealed that Flynn is on Colton's payroll, and is responsible for leaking Carter's and Moses' whereabouts to him. Moses takes a bullet in the shoulder to save Carter's life, giving him time enough to arrest Flynn, then shoots Colton dead. Moses gives the incriminating documents on Colton to Carter, who allows him to escape. He heads to Mexico to become a bullfighter, with Carter and Moses' mother later accompanying him.

== Cast ==
- Damon Wayans as Detective Jack Carter / Rock Keats
- Adam Sandler as Archie Moses
- James Caan as Frank Colton
- Jeep Swenson as Bledsoe
- James Farentino as Captain Will Jensen
- Kristen Wilson as Dr. Traci Flynn
- Larry McCoy as Detective Sulliman
- Allen Covert as Detective Jones
- Bill Nunn as DEA Agent Finch
- Mark Roberts as Charles
- Xander Berkeley as FBI Agent Darryl Gentry
- Mark Castella as Disneyland cop
- Andrew Shaifer as Cop at airport
- Monica Potter as Biker's woman
- Jonathan Loughran as Rookie cop
- Steve White as Veteran cop

== Production ==
Reflecting on the film years later, director Ernest Dickerson spoke to DVD Talk of his regretful experiences making the film:

There's a movie I did a couple years ago called Bulletproof. I'd like to just erase that whole experience. You know, I'm proud of a lot of the films I've done, but there's some situations that happened that in retrospect maybe I could have handled them a little differently if I had been a little smarter about it. But that's all second-guessing.

== Soundtrack ==
A soundtrack containing mostly hip hop and R&B music was released on September 3, 1996, by MCA Records. It reached No. 85 on the Billboard 200 and #23 on the Top R&B/Hip-Hop Albums.

In addition, Varese Sarabande released an album of Elmer Bernstein's score.

== Reception ==
=== Box office ===
Bulletproof grossed $6 million its opening weekend, placing it at No. 1 at the box office. By the end of its theatrical run, it pulled in $21.6 million in North America and $1 million internationally for a worldwide total of $22.6 million.

=== Critical response ===
On review aggregator Rotten Tomatoes, the film holds an approval rating of 8% based on 38 reviews and an average rating of 3.7/10. The website's critical consensus reads, "In addition to its ability to deflect gunfire, Bulletproof proves sadly impervious to humor, logic, or worthwhile viewing." On Metacritic, the film received a score of 30 based on 16 reviews, indicating "generally unfavorable" reviews.

Audiences polled by CinemaScore gave the film an average grade of "B" on an A+ to F scale.

== Sequel ==
A direct to video sequel, Bulletproof 2, was released on January 7, 2020, directed by Don Michael Paul and stars Faizon Love and Kirk Fox as Jack Carter and Archie Moses replacing both Wayans and Sandler.

== See also ==
- Adam Sandler filmography
- List of American films of 1996
