= They're All Gonna Laugh at You! =

Studio album by Adam Sandler
- Released: September 28, 1993 (US)
- Venues: The Hit Factory, New York City; The Zoo, Encino, California
- Genre: Comedy
- Length: 54:12
- Label: Warner Bros.
- Producer: Brooks Arthur

Adam Sandler chronology
They're All Gonna Laugh at You! (1993)	What the Hell Happened to Me? (1996)

They're All Gonna Laugh at You! is the debut album by American actor and comedian Adam Sandler, released in 1993. The title comes from a repeated line in the track "Oh Mom...", which is a parody of a scene in the film Carrie. Several of the tracks on the album feature adult humor, in contrast to the material in his films, which are generally rated PG or PG-13. This is a trend that would continue on his subsequent comedy albums and live tours.

== Production ==
At the time of the recording, Adam Sandler was in the middle of his five-season career at Saturday Night Live and much of the album was made with the help of his friends from the show. Besides Sandler, the album features fellow SNL performers Rob Schneider, David Spade, Chris Farley, and Tim Meadows, as well as SNL writers Conan O'Brien, Robert Smigel, and career writing partner Tim Herlihy. The album was also produced by G. E. Smith, SNL's musical director at the time. Several friends of Sandler's also perform and co-write on the album, some of whom would go on to become recurring players in Sandler's films, most notably Allen Covert.

In addition to several non-musical skits, the album includes five songs, two of which were performed live (and previously were performed on SNL: "The Thanksgiving Song" and "Lunchlady Land") at The Strand in Redondo Beach, California on July 25, 1993, while "Food Innuendo Guy" is an uptempo George Thorogood meets Aerosmith-influenced blues rocker, "At a Medium Pace" is a sexually explicit love song, and "My Little Chicken" is a jazzy humorous number in which Sandler sings about his love for chickens.

== Reception ==
Professional ratings
Review scores
Source	Rating
AllMusic	3.5/5 stars
Entertainment Weekly	D
Pitchfork	6.9/10

The album was nominated for Best Comedy Album at the 37th Annual Grammy Awards. It has been certified 2× platinum, having sold over two million copies.

As of 2014, sales in the United States have exceeded 1,831,000 copies, according to Nielsen SoundScan.

== Track listing ==
All tracks are written by Adam Sandler, except where noted.

No.	Title	Writer(s)	Length
1.	"Assistant Principal's Big Day"	Sandler, Tim Herlihy, Rob Schneider	2:20
2.	"The Buffoon and the Dean of Admissions"	Sandler, Herlihy	2:16
3.	"Buddy"	Sandler, Schneider	2:12
4.	"The Longest Pee"	Sandler, Schneider	2:15
5.	"**Food Innuendo Guy**"	Sandler, Jon Rosenberg	2:24
6.	"The Beating of a High School Janitor"		0:31
7.	"Right Field"	Sandler, F. Wolf, H. Busgang, D. McGrath	3:11
8.	"The Buffoon and the Valedictorian"	Sandler, Herlihy	2:16
9.	"Mr. Spindel's Phone Call"	Sandler, Robert Smigel	2:01
10.	"**The Thanksgiving Song**" (Live at The Strand, Redondo Beach, CA, July 25, 1993)	Sandler, Smigel, Ian Maxtone-Graham	3:46
11.	"The Beating of a High School Bus Driver"	Sandler, Koren	0:57
12.	"Oh Mom..."	Sandler, Schneider	2:08
13.	"Fatty McGee"	Sandler, Spade, Meadows	3:12
14.	"**At a Medium Pace**"	Sandler, Koren, Smigel	3:16
15.	"The Beating of a High School Science Teacher"		0:50
16.	"The Cheerleader"	Sandler, Schneider	1:34
17.	"I'm So Wasted"	Sandler, Schneider	5:00
18.	"**Lunchlady Land**" (Live at The Strand, Redondo Beach, CA, July 25, 1993)	Sandler, Bob Odenkirk, Allen Covert, Herlihy	5:01
19.	"The Beating of a High School Spanish Teacher"		0:28
20.	"Toll Booth Willie"	Sandler, Koren	3:47
21.	"Teenage Love on the Phone"		2:32
22.	"**My Little Chicken**"	Sandler, Schneider	2:15
Total length:			54:12

Tracks in bold are songs.

== Personnel ==
- Adam Sandler – writer/performer
- Allen Covert – writer/performer
- Rob Schneider – writer/performer
- Robert Smigel – writer/performer
- Tim Herlihy – writer/performer
- Tim Meadows – performer
- David Spade – performer
- Chris Farley – performer
- Andrew Leeds – performer
- Conan O'Brien – performer
- Jennifer Lien – performer
- Meghan Andrews – performer
- Margaret Ruden – performer
- Brooks Arthur – producer
- G.E. Smith – musical director
- Elmo Weber – sound effect engineer
- Frank Nadasdy – engineer
- Gabe Veltri – engineer, mixing
- Peter Elia – assistant engineer

== Charts ==
=== Weekly charts ===
Weekly chart performance for They're All Gonna Laugh at You!
Chart (1993)	Peak position
US Billboard 200	129
US Heatseekers Albums (Billboard)	2
US Top Catalog Albums (Billboard)	17

=== Songs chart positions ===
Chart performance for songs from They're All Gonna Laugh at You!
Title	Year	Peak chart positions	
Title	Year	Adult Pop	Mainstream Rock
"The Thanksgiving Song"	1997	40	29

== Certifications ==
Certifications for They're All Gonna Laugh at You!
Region	Certification	Certified units/sales
Canada (Music Canada)	Gold	50,000^{^}
United States (RIAA)	2× Platinum	2,000,000^{^}
^{^} Shipments figures based on certification alone.
