= Stan and Judy's Kid =

Studio album by Adam Sandler
- Released: September 21, 1999
- Genre: Comedy
- Length: 75:20
- Label: Warner Bros.
- Producers: Brooks Arthur, Adam Sandler, L. Mo Weber

Adam Sandler chronology
What's Your Name? (1997)	Stan and Judy's Kid (1999)	Shhh...Don't Tell (2004)

Professional ratings
Review scores
Source	Rating
AllMusic	link

Stan and Judy's Kid is the fourth studio album by Adam Sandler. It was nominated for the 2000 Grammy Award for Best Spoken Comedy Album. By selling 80,889 units in its opening week, it set the record for the highest first week of sales of a comedy recording. The sales numbers were achieved without the promotional push of a radio single or video. As of 2009, it has been certified gold, having sold over 500,000 copies in the US.

== Track listing ==
No.	Title	Length
1.	"Hot Water Burn Baby"	4:28
2.	"Cool Guy 1"	0:58
3.	"**7 Foot Man**"	3:45
4.	"The Peeper"	6:00
5.	"Cool Guy 2"	1:37
6.	"**Dee Wee (My Friend the Massive Idiot)**"	2:58
7.	"Whitey"	16:17
8.	"Cool Guy 3"	1:23
9.	"**She Comes Home to Me**"	4:01
10.	"The Champion"	7:57
11.	"Cool Guy 4"	1:15
12.	"**The Chanukah Song, Part II**"	4:02
13.	"Inner Voice"	4:30
14.	"Cool Guy 5"	1:37
15.	"**Welcome My Son**"	2:12
16.	"The Psychotic Legend of Uncle Donnie"	11:18
17.	"Reprise"	1:00
Total length:		75:20

Tracks in bold are songs.

"The Peeper" was made into a flash cartoon, which is readily available on the Internet. It launched over the Labor Day weekend as a promotion for the CD and was watched by over 1 million users during that period, one of the most watched video clips on the internet at the time. "Whitey" had a spin-off film in 2002 called Eight Crazy Nights. "The Psychotic Legend of Uncle Donnie" also had a spin-off film in 2012 called That's My Boy.

== Personnel ==
- Adam Sandler – main performer, vocals, guitar, producer
- Allen Covert – performer, backing vocals, producer
- Earl Martin – performer, digital editing
- DJ Nu-Mark – DJ Scratches
- Rob Schneider – performer
- Peter Dante – performer
- George Wallace – performer
- Blake Clark – performer
- Drew Barrymore – performer
- Maxi Anderson – backing vocals
- Alex Brown – backing vocals
- Natalie Jackson – backing vocals
- Teddy Castellucci – guitar
- Gary Foster – guitar
- Jim Fox – guitar
- Chuck Berghofer – bass
- Mike Lang – piano
- Aaron Zigman – synthesizer
- Gene Cipriano – saxophone
- Dan Higgins – saxophone
- Nino Tempo – saxophone
- Bill Elton – trombone
- Ken Kugler – trombone
- Chauncey Welsch – trombone
- Rick Baptist – trumpet
- Wayne Bergeron – trumpet
- George Graham – trumpet
- Warren Luening – trumpet
- Greg Field – drums
- Don Heffington – drums
- Ray Ellis – arranger, conductor
- Brooks Arthur – producer, photography
- L. Mo Weber – producer, mixing
- Jolie Levine-Aller – production coordination
- Brian Dixon – assistant engineer
- Wil Donovan – assistant engineer
- John Hendrickson – assistant engineer
- Tulio Torrinello, Jr. – assistant engineer
- Stephen Marcussen – mastering
- Gabe Veltri – mixing, recording
- Rich Breen – digital editing
- Ted Lobinger – digital editing
- Stewart Whitmore – digital editing
- Chris McCann – photography

== Charts ==
Chart performance for Stan and Judy's Kid
Chart (1999)	Peak position
Australian Albums (ARIA)	89
Canada Top Albums/CDs (RPM)	19
Canadian Albums (Billboard)	20
US Billboard 200	16

== Certifications ==
Certifications for Stan and Judy's Kid
Region	Certification	Certified units/sales
United States (RIAA)	Gold	500,000^{^}
^{^} Shipments figures based on certification alone.
