= Adam Sandler: 100% Fresh =

2018 American comedy special

- Written by: Adam Sandler
- Directed by: Steven Brill
- Starring: Adam Sandler
- Country of origin: United States
- Original language: English

Production
- Running time: 73 minutes
- Production company: Happy Madison Productions

Original release
- Network: Netflix
- Release: October 23, 2018

Adam Sandler: 100% Fresh is the second stand-up comedy special by American comedian Adam Sandler, released by Netflix on October 23, 2018. Directed by Steven Brill, it is Sandler's first special for Netflix and his first special since 1996. The special featured appearances by Dan Bulla and Rob Schneider. In 2019, Sandler and Schneider toured in support of the film on the 100% Fresher Tour.

== Reception ==
Adam Sandler: 100% Fresh received widespread acclaim from critics, with a 90% fresh rating on Rotten Tomatoes. The website's critics consensus reads, "An energetic Sandler jumps back into the spotlight with fresh songs, stories, and spoofs in Adam Sandler: 100% Fresh, a wonderful return to form for a beloved comedian." For the special, Sandler was nominated for the Primetime Emmy Award for Outstanding Writing for a Variety Special.

The special was also lauded for its many musical numbers, among them "Phone Wallet Keys", "Bar Mitzvah Boy", "UFC Ears" and an emotional tribute to fellow Saturday Night Live alum Chris Farley, which has received over 14 million views since it was uploaded to YouTube in December 2018. An audio version was released to digital and streaming services March 22, 2019.
