= The Waterboy =

1998 film by Frank Coraci

- Theatrical release poster
- Directed by: Frank Coraci
- Written by: Tim Herlihy; Adam Sandler
- Produced by: Jack Giarraputo; Robert Simonds
- Starring: Adam Sandler; Kathy Bates; Fairuza Balk; Jerry Reed; Henry Winkler
- Cinematography: Steven Bernstein
- Edited by: Tom Lewis
- Music by: Alan Pasqua
- Production companies: Touchstone Pictures; Jack Giarraputo Productions; Robert Simonds Productions
- Distributed by: Buena Vista Pictures Distribution
- Release date: November 6, 1998
- Running time: 90 minutes
- Country: United States
- Language: English
- Budget: $23 million
- Box office: $190.2 million

The Waterboy is a 1998 American sports comedy film directed by Frank Coraci. It was written by Adam Sandler and Tim Herlihy, and produced by Robert Simonds and Jack Giarraputo. Sandler also stars as the title character, while Kathy Bates, Fairuza Balk, Henry Winkler, Jerry Reed, Lawrence Gilliard Jr., Blake Clark, Peter Dante, and Jonathan Loughran play other characters.

Lynn Swann, Lawrence Taylor, Jimmy Johnson, Bill Cowher, Paul "The Big Show" Wight, and Rob Schneider have cameo appearances. The Waterboy was produced by Touchstone Pictures, Jack Giarraputo Productions and Robert Simonds Productions and released by Buena Vista Pictures Distribution on November 6, 1998. Despite receiving mixed reviews from critics at the time of release it has since garnered a cult following and has been described as one of Sandler's best works. It was also extremely profitable, earning $39.4 million in its opening weekend alone in the United States, and earning a total of $190.2 million worldwide against a $23 million budget.

== Plot ==
Bobby Boucher (Sandler) is a socially inept, stuttering, 31-year-old man serving as the water boy of the University of Louisiana Cougars football team. He lives with his protective and extremely religious mother, Helen (Bates), and believes his father, Robert Sr., died of dehydration in the Sahara, while serving in the Peace Corps back in the 1960s. He also uses a riding lawnmower as his only means of transportation. As the players constantly bully Bobby, the Cougars' head coach, Red Beaulieu (Reed), fires him for being "disruptive" during the 18 years of his employment. Bobby approaches Coach Klein (Winkler) of the South Central Louisiana State University Mud Dogs, and upon seeing their dirty water, he volunteers as the water boy free of charge.

The Mud Dogs have lost 40 consecutive games, their cheerleaders and the mascot are alcoholics and players are forced to share equipment due to budget cuts. Bobby befriends Derek Wallace, the field goal kicker, however, when the new team teases him, Klein encourages Bobby to stand up for himself. Remembering all the bullying he has put up with over the years, Bobby tackles Gee Grenouille (Dante), the team's quarterback, knocking him out. Seeing Bobby's potential, Klein meets with Helen and tries to persuade her to let Bobby play on the team, but she refuses, saying it is too dangerous.

Klein convinces Bobby to play anyway, seeing that he is eager to attend college. Bobby becomes a feared outside linebacker. In his first game, he costs the Mud Dogs a win to take down a player who trash-talked his mother. Later, Bobby invites his childhood crush, Vicky Vallencourt (Balk), to a barbecue, in which Helen humiliates Bobby and chastises Vicky as "The Devil", forbidding Bobby from ever seeing her again. Bobby used this event as a fuel to break the Mud Dogs losing streak. Bobby is finally given some recognition after that victory and attends an after-party. Overtime, the Mud Dogs continue winning while Helen has her pet donkey, Steve, to keep her company.

The team's success earns them new uniforms and a trip to the annual Bourbon Bowl on New Year's Day to face the Cougars and Coach Beaulieu. However, Beaulieu and his team crash the Mud Dogs' pep rally and reveal that the high school Bobby went to does not exist and that he was homeschooled, and his fake high school transcript makes him ineligible for college and football. Greg gets into Bobby's face, during which Vicky puts a blade to his throat. Vicky is arrested and the team and fans turn against Bobby, believing he is a liar and cheater.

Klein convinces the NCAA to let Bobby play if he can pass a GED exam. He apologizes to Bobby and admits to submitting the fake transcript because he was desperate to finally win something and get even with Beaulieu. Twenty years prior, Klein and Beaulieu were assistant coaches at the University of Louisiana and the predecessor was retiring. After Beaulieu intimidated Klein into turning over his playbook and took credit for the plays, he was promoted, and Klein was fired. Klein suffered a mental breakdown and could not come up with new plays. The story convinces Bobby to help Klein get revenge on Beaulieu and prove himself to everyone. Bobby finally stands up to Helen while studying for the GED, angrily revealing that he has been playing football, going to college, and seeing Vicki, and intends to continue doing so.

Bobby passes the exam with flying colors, but Helen feigns a coma. Feeling he drove Helen to illness, Bobby stays in the hospital with her. Meanwhile, Vicki leads a gathering of fans to the hospital to convince him to play. Seeing Bobby struggling to ignore this, Helen ends her fake illness. She tells Bobby the truth about Robert Sr., who abandoned her while she was four months pregnant with Bobby to have an affair with a voodoo priestess named Phyllis in New Orleans while living up life in the city and finding a job. This led to Helen constantly fearing that Bobby also would leave her. Deciding to put Bobby's happiness ahead of her own selfishness, she encourages him to play in the Bourbon Bowl.

Arriving at halftime via airboat, Bobby finds the Mud Dogs losing by a score of 27–0. As Bobby dominates the field and enables a fumble-turned-touchdown, Red has his offense take a knee, knowing Bobby cannot cause a turnover and the fact that the SCLSU offense is useless. Using the same technique of "visualizing and attacking" that Klein taught him, Bobby then turns the lesson back on him. Klein overcomes his fear of Beaulieu and comes up with amazing new plays. The Mud Dogs begin catching up. After a successful recovery during an onside kick, Bobby is then given a cheap shot by Meaney and is knocked out cold. Vicki is able to revive Bobby by giving him the Alaskan water that Bobby had. Bobby and the Mud Dogs carry out one final play before time runs out and win the Bourbon Bowl 30–27, and Bobby is named the game's MVP.

Sometime later, Bobby and Vicki get married. Robert Sr., who has since adopted the nickname "Roberto", makes a surprise appearance to try to convince Bobby to skip school and go to the NFL so he can share in Bobby's newfound fame. Helen angrily tackles him to the ground as revenge for the abandonment years ago and attempt to pull Bobby into one of his games, prompting cheers from the attendants. Bobby and Vicki leave on his lawnmower to consummate their marriage.

== Cast ==
- Adam Sandler as Robert "Bobby" Boucher Jr., a "slow-minded" and socially awkward waterboy recruited to play football.
  - Jamie Williams as Young Bobby
  - Marc Kittay as Youngest Bobby
- Kathy Bates as Helen "Mama" Boucher, Bobby's overprotective, devoutly Christian mother who refers to all things she disapproves of as The Devil.
- Henry Winkler as Coach Klein, the low self-esteemed coach of the SCLSU Mud Dogs football team.
- Fairuza Balk as Vicki Vallencourt, Bobby's childhood crush who has a rap sheet.
- Jerry Reed as Coach Red Beaulieu, coach of the UL Cougars football team and Bobby's former employer.
- Peter Dante as Gee Grenouille, quarterback for the SCLSU Mud Dogs
- Larry Gilliard Jr. as Derek Wallace, kicker for the SCLSU Mud Dogs.
- Blake Clark as Farmer Fran, the Cajun-accented assistant coach for the SCLSU Mud Dogs. He later reprised this role in a cameo appearance in the 2001 film Joe Dirt.
- Jonathan Loughran as Lyle Robideaux, the cross-eyed linebacker for the SCLSU Mud Dogs
- Clint Howard as Paco, the mentally absent-minded Mud Dogs fan
- Allen Covert as Walter, Paco's drinking buddy who is also a Mud Dogs fan
- Rob Schneider as Townie; Schneider reprises this role in Adam Sandler's film of 2000, Little Nicky, despite that film being released by New Line Cinema; in turn, Sandler plays the same townie in Schneider's film The Animal.
- Todd Holland as Greg Meaney, the best defensive player for the UL Cougars
- Kevin Farley as Jim Simonds
- Robert Kokol as The Professor, one of Bobby's college lecturers whom Bobby nicknames "Colonel Sanders" because of his appearance and 'Southern Gentleman' mannerisms.
- Frank Coraci as Robert "Roberto" Boucher Sr., Bobby's estranged father who deserted him and Helen years ago
- Paul Wight as Captain Insano, Boucher's favorite wrestler
- Soon Hee Newbold as Mud Dog Cheerleader
- Dan Fouts as himself
- Brent Musburger as himself
- Lynn Swann as himself
- Chris Fowler as himself
- Lee Corso as himself
- Trevor Miller as himself
- Dan Patrick as himself
- Lawrence Taylor as himself
- Bill Cowher as himself
- Jimmy Johnson as himself
- Jennifer Bini Taylor as Rita

== Production ==
The idea for The Waterboy came from one of Adam Sandler's Saturday Night Live characters. Sandler said, "You could compare him to 'Canteen Boy,' whereas he does love water and they both get picked on a lot, but the thing I like the most about this character is just that he is a genuine, good person."

Writer Tim Herlihy said the story was intended to invert the formula of his previous films, where Sandler was an extreme character surrounded by regular people. "With Happy Gilmore, [...] it was a very straight world that he was the disruptive element in. The pressure was all on Adam to be funny as Happy. Whereas this was like a funhouse, crazy version of Southern college football milieu. And it was the first movie where things were funny when Adam wasn't on screen. The pressure wasn't even on him."

Herlihy could not believe their luck getting Kathy Bates to play Boucher's mother. Bates' agent did not want her to do the film, and Bates threw the script in the trash after reading some pages, not being interested in football. Her niece spotted the script and noticed Sandler's name, and convinced her to reconsider.

=== Filming ===
Despite taking place in Louisiana, The Waterboy was mostly filmed in Central Florida and the Orlando area, as well as Clermont, Daytona Beach, DeLand, and Lakeland.

The Mud Dogs home games were filmed at Spec Martin Stadium in DeLand, home of the local high school's football team, as well as the Stetson Hatters (Pioneer League, FCS) The classrooms and gym where Bobby takes the GED are part of Stetson University, also located in DeLand. Stetson's Carlton Student Union building is featured in the scene where Bobby is told his mother has been hospitalized.

The scenes involving Mama's cabin were shot on Lake Louisa in Clermont.

Coach Klein's office was a stage built inside of the Florida Army National Guard Armory in DeLand. It is the home of Btry B 1st Bn 265th ADA. In the background of the practice field scenes, the armory and some military vehicles can be seen.

The initial exterior shot of the University of Louisiana stadium was TIAA Bank Field in Jacksonville; the interior of the stadium is actually the Camping World Stadium in Orlando. The Camping World Stadium was also the filming location for the climactic Bourbon Bowl game, while the flyover shot at the beginning of the game is of Williams-Brice Stadium at the University of South Carolina in Columbia, South Carolina.

The "medulla oblongata" lecture scene was filmed at Florida Southern College in Lakeland. The extras in the scene were students at the college, and the scene was shot on campus in Edge Hall.

== Soundtrack ==
The Waterboy: Original Soundtrack

Soundtrack album by Various artists
- Released: November 3, 1998
- Length: 54:53
- Label: Hollywood

The soundtrack for The Waterboy was released on November 3, 1998, by Hollywood Records.

No.	Title	Writer(s)	Artist	Length
1.	"Born on the Bayou"	John Fogerty	Creedence Clearwater Revival	5:15
2.	"More Today Than Yesterday"	Pat Upton	Goldfinger	3:22
3.	"Boom Boom"	John Lee Hooker	Big Head Todd and the Monsters	3:33
4.	"Feed It"	Nick Cope; Mark Cope; Nick Burton; Karl Shale; John Halliday	The Candyskins	3:35
5.	"Peace Frog"	Jim Morrison; Robby Krieger	The Doors	2:57
6.	"Let's Groove"	Maurice White; Wayne Vaughn	Earth, Wind & Fire	5:38
7.	"Always on the Run"	Lenny Kravitz; Saul Hudson	Lenny Kravitz	3:53
8.	"Doin' My Thang"	Sherwin Charles; Ivan Norwood; James Carter; Travis Lane; Maurice White; Al McKay	Lifelong feat. Incident	4:10
9.	"Small Town"	John Mellencamp	John Mellencamp	3:40
10.	"New Year's Eve"	Joe Walsh; Waddy Wachtel	Joe Walsh	4:00
11.	"No One to Run With"	Dickey Betts; John Prestia	The Allman Brothers Band	5:58
12.	"Tom Sawyer"	Pye Dubois; Geddy Lee; Alex Lifeson; Neil Peart	Rush	4:34
13.	"Glowing Soul"	Kevin Martin	Candlebox	4:18
Total length:				54:53

== Reception ==
=== Critical response ===
As of May 2025, review aggregator website Rotten Tomatoes reported the film had an approval rating of 33% based on 75 reviews with an average rating of 4.50/10. The site's critical consensus reads: "This is an insult to its genre with low humor and cheap gags." On Metacritic, the film has a score of 41% based on reviews from 21 critics, indicating "mixed or average reviews". Audiences surveyed by CinemaScore gave the film a grade "A−" on scale of A to F.

Roger Ebert of the Chicago Sun-Times gave the film a negative review, saying "Sandler is making a tactical error when he creates a character whose manner and voice has the effect of fingernails on a blackboard, and then expects us to hang in there for a whole movie." He also included the film on his most hated list. Lisa Alspector of the Chicago Reader also gave the film a negative review, writing "Geek triumphs after all comedies can be charming, but in this one the triumphing begins so early it's hard to feel for the geek."

Michael O'Sullivan of The Washington Post described the movie as "[a]nother film about . . . a cretinous, grating loser." Manohla Dargis of LA Weekly gave the film a mixed review, writing: "Of course it's dumb, but every 10 minutes or so, it's also pretty funny." Glen Lovell of Variety wrote of the film, "This yahoos on the bayou farce is neither inventive nor outrageous enough." David Nusair of Reel Film Reviews also gave the film a mixed review, calling it "an agreeable yet forgettable comedy."

Janet Maslin of The New York Times wrote the film was "so cheerfully outlandish that it's hard to resist, and so good hearted that it's genuinely endearing." Mark Savlov of The Austin Chronicle also gave the film a positive review, writing that it was "A mildly amusing bayou farce with plenty of 'foosball' action to liven the sometimes plodding proceedings."

=== Box office ===
The Waterboy grossed $169,429,646 in the United States, and a further $28,700,000 internationally, for a worldwide total of $190,191,646 worldwide, against an estimated production budget of $20 million. The film opened at number 1 at the US box office, earning $39,414,071 in its opening weekend, a record opening for November, surpassing Ace Ventura: When Nature Calls. The trailer for Star Wars: Episode I – The Phantom Menace was released alongside the film, in its second week.

The film was released in the United Kingdom on April 30, 1999, and topped the country's box office that weekend. As of 2020, The Waterboy is the highest-grossing film in the sports comedy genre.

== Accolades ==
For his role, Sandler was nominated for a Golden Raspberry Award for Worst Actor. The Stinkers Bad Movie Awards awarded him Most Annoying Fake Accent in 1998. He also won a Blockbuster Entertainment Award and a MTV Movie Award for his performance. In 2000, the American Film Institute, nominated the film for AFI's 100 Years of Laughs.

== Legacy ==
Comparisons are often made between former LSU head coach Ed Orgeron and Waterboy character Farmer Fran due to Orgeron's Louisiana roots, Cajun heritage and accent.

== Future ==
In September 2022, Adam Sandler stated that he was open to making a sequel. While Sandler stated that he has not figured out the story yet, he was looking forward to returning in the title role at some point.

== See also ==
- List of American football films
