= Stanley Booth =

American music journalist (1942–2024)

- Born: January 5, 1942; Waycross, Georgia, U.S.
- Died: December 19, 2024 (aged 82); Memphis, Tennessee, U.S.
- Education: Memphis State University
- Occupation: Music journalist

Stanley Booth (January 5, 1942 – December 19, 2024) was an American music journalist based in Memphis, Tennessee. Characterized by Richie Unterberger as a "fine, if not extremely prolific, writer who generally speaking specializes in portraits of roots musicians, most of whom did their best work in the '60s and '50s," Booth wrote extensively about Keith Richards, Otis Redding, Janis Joplin, James Brown, Elvis Presley, Gram Parsons, B.B. King, and Al Green. He chronicled his travels with the Rolling Stones in several of his works.

== Life and career ==
Booth was born in Waycross, Georgia, and received a degree in English and art history from Memphis State University (where he cultivated a lifelong friendship with fellow student Jim Dickinson) in 1963. After leaving a graduate program at Tulane University without taking a degree, he began his journalistic career while maintaining a day job with the Tennessee Department of Welfare. His early oeuvre includes notable articles on Memphis musicians like Presley (including a seminal 1967 article for Esquire regarded by James Calemine as "the first serious article" written about the singer) and Redding, the latter of whom Booth witnessed writing the famous song "(Sittin' On) The Dock of the Bay" with Steve Cropper at Stax Studios on the Friday before Redding's death.

After befriending Keith Richards at the instigation of Ian Stewart while covering the trial of Brian Jones in 1968, he ensconced himself in the band's inner circle; shortly thereafter, he traveled with the band during their 1969 American tour. During this period, Booth was introduced to fellow Richards confederate and Waycross native Gram Parsons of The Flying Burrito Brothers (he reviewed The Gilded Palace of Sin for Rolling Stone contemporaneously) and was present at the infamous Altamont Free Concert, where a concertgoer was killed by a member of the Hells Angels.

Although his 1970 profile of Furry Lewis received the annual Playboy Best Nonfiction Award, Booth retreated to a cabin in the Boston Mountains of Newton County, Arkansas for many years following a 1971 drug conviction of a year's probation. Subsequent setbacks, including circumspection toward the Rolling Stones' 1972 American tour (which he attempted to cover but ultimately castigated as "an ugly scene full of amyl nitrate, Quaaludes, tequila sunrises, cocaine, heroin, and too many pistoleros, and it left me with more material than I could ever use"), precipitated a long creative interregnum typified by "clinical depression, drug problems and domestic upheaval"; these problems were exacerbated by an LSD-induced back injury in 1978. Nevertheless, his long-gestating account of the 1969 tour (Dance with the Devil: The Rolling Stones and Their Times, later republished as The True Adventures of the Rolling Stones) was finally released to rapturous reviews in 1984. However, the book's effusive reception (including plaudits from Richards, who has characterized the book as "the only one I can read and say, 'Yeah, that's how it was...'") belied lingering contractual issues that ensured Booth made "next to nothing" from his work.

In addition to an essay collection (Rythm Oil) and a biography of Richards, Booth also published articles in Rolling Stone, GQ and many smaller journals. He appeared in many documentaries, not only on Southern music and the Rolling Stones, but Tom Thurman's Movies of Color and Peckinpah. For some years Booth lived near Brunswick, Georgia with his wife, the poet Diann Blakely. Subsequently he resided in Memphis, and was finishing the successor to Rythm Oil, currently entitled Blues Dues; a memoir, Tree Full of Owls; and Distant Thoughts, a series of letters chronicling the unfolding literary relationship and love story between Booth and poet Blakely.

Booth died in Memphis, Tennessee, on December 19, 2024, at the age of 82.

== Selected works ==
- "Furry's Blues," 1970 (Playboy article)
- Dance with the Devil: The Rolling Stones and Their Times, 1984
- Rythm Oil: A Journey Through the Music of the American South, 1991
- Keith: Standing in the Shadows, 1996
- The True Adventures of the Rolling Stones, 2000 (revised iteration of Dance with the Devil)

== Articles and essays ==
- "Blues Dues," by Stanley Booth (Blues For Peace)
- "Sharps and Flats: Various Artists - Midnight in the Garden of Good and Evil: Music From and Inspired by the Motion Picture". Salon. November 21, 1997. Archived from the original on January 29, 2000.
- "Memphis and the Beale Street Blues". Gadfly Online. May 1998.
- "Bobby Rush: A Blues Access Interview". Blues Access. Summer 1998.
- "Crying in the Wilderness". Gadfly. December 1998.
- "Unanointed, Unannealed". Chapter 16. January 20, 2011.
- "Bea Shall Overcome: The Unexpurgated Version". Option. May 18, 2011.
