= Kinda Pregnant =

2025 film by Tyler Spindel

- Release poster
- Directed by: Tyler Spindel
- Screenplay by: Julie Paiva; Amy Schumer
- Story by: Julie Paiva
- Produced by: Adam Sandler; Tim Herlihy; Amy Schumer; Molly Sims; Alex Saks; Kevin Grady; Eli Thomas; Judit Maull
- Starring: Amy Schumer; Jillian Bell; Brianne Howey; Will Forte
- Cinematography: Stuart Dryburgh
- Edited by: Tom Costain; J.J. Titone
- Music by: Rupert Gregson-Williams
- Production companies: Happy Madison Productions; Something Happy; It's So Easy; Saks Picture Company
- Distributed by: Netflix
- Release date: February 5, 2025
- Running time: 98 minutes
- Country: United States
- Language: English

Kinda Pregnant is a 2025 American comedy film directed by Tyler Spindel, written by Julie Paiva and Amy Schumer, and starring Schumer alongside Jillian Bell, Brianne Howey, and Will Forte.

The plot tells the story of 40-year-old school teacher Lainy, who gets envious when her lifelong best friend and colleague Kate and another co-worker are both pregnant, leading her to steal a fake pregnancy belly to pretend to be pregnant.

The film was released on February 5, 2025 by Netflix. Kinda Pregnant was the most-watched title on Netflix during the week of February 3–9, hitting 25.1 million views in its first five days of streaming.

== Plot ==
As a child, Lainy plays a mom giving birth, with her best friend Kate. After they grow up, both are teachers at the same school. Kate is married and becomes pregnant.

When Dave, Lainy's boyfriend of four years, invites her to dinner and asks her to participate in a threesome, she loses her cool as she was expecting a proposal. In her class the next day, she burns her students' Shakespeare books and sets off the fire alarm. Kate tells Lainy about her pregnancy when they meet up for lunch.

Next day at school, Lainy learns that another younger teacher Shirley is also pregnant. Lainy and Kate go to a maternity clothing store, where she puts on a fake pregnancy belly. She is happy with people on the street wishing her well and treating her with respect. She dons the fake belly and visits a Prenatal Yoga class called "Mamaste", where she befriends Megan, a pregnant woman.

Megan invites Lainy to her home for dinner, where she again meets her brother Josh (who she first met at a coffee shop) and husband Steve. Her belly accidentally catches fire and while patching it up, she talks to Megan for a while, who thanks Lainy for giving her strength, so Lainy continues faking her pregnancy.

Lainy's co-worker, Fallon, is aware of her faking her pregnancy and tells her to stop, but Lainy does not listen. At a children's store, Megan's son sees Lainy and Kate and observes the lack of baby belly. Steve and Megan are also there, but Lainy hides so they cannot see her.

Josh calls Lainy for a date on an ice skating rink and then on a City Cruises Yacht dinner and dance. They bump into Dave, her ex-boyfriend, who believes her when she says she got pregnant during a Thanksgiving Black Friday sale.

Megan visits Lainy at her school, inviting her to join her at a therapeutic class for pregnant women. Lainy grabs a helium balloon beneath her dress in lieu of the fake belly to make it appear as if she is pregnant. Fallon also shows up at the class, pretending to be pregnant.

When at Megan's to babysit her son, Lainy kisses Josh; they go into the garage, his bedroom here. Before they have sex, she insists Josh not see nor touch her to keep her fake pregnancy from being discovered. They have sex in the cowgirl position, during which the garage door opens by mistake. After Josh admits he feels he can really trust her and believes they could make it together with the baby, she leaves abruptly, saying she cannot continue with him.

Lainy confides to Fallon about getting rid of her (non-existent) baby and is overheard by Shirley, who tells Kate about it. At Kate's joint baby shower, Megan, her husband and Josh arrive upon Shirley's invitation. Lainy places a roast chicken up her dress to keep up the fake pregnancy, but when confronted about it, drops the chicken and tells everyone she is not really pregnant, whereupon the upset Megan and Josh leave.

Kate and Megan both reconcile with Lainy. She finally tells Josh she loves him and her real name. Dave visits Lainy, who first lies to him saying he is going to be the father of triplets and then watches his relief when she removes her fake pregnant cushion.

Lainy goes back to teaching when one of her students tells her there is a Zamboni outside. They all go out to meet Josh, who confesses his love for her. They ride the Zamboni, accidentally causing extensive property damage on the way from the school.

== Cast ==
- Amy Schumer as Lainy Newton, a teacher who pretends to be pregnant
  - Jayne Sowers as 7-year-old Lainy
- Will Forte as Josh Lewis, a man who becomes Lainy's love interest and is also Megan's brother
- Jillian Bell as Kate, a teacher and Lainy's best friend
  - Julianna Layne as 7-year-old Kate
- Brianne Howey as Megan Taylor, a pregnant woman that Lainy befriends and Josh's sister
- Lizze Broadway as Shirley, a younger teacher
- Urzila Carlson as Fallon, a co-worker of Lainy
- Chris Geere as Steve, the brother-in-law of Josh, husband of Megan
- Damon Wayans Jr. as Dave, a man who was Lainy's boyfriend for four years
- Alex Moffat as Rawn, Shirley's husband
- Joel David Moore as Mark, Kate's husband
- Molly Sims as the prenatal workshop teacher
- Dave Attell as Shirley's Father
- Francis Benhamou as Jane, a pregnant yoga class student
- Jackie Sandler as Yoga Class Teacher
- Allison Strong as Dumbo Waitress
- Tyler Spindel as the voice of Andy

== Production ==
In November 2023, it was announced that Amy Schumer was producing and starring in Kinda Pregnant for Netflix. Also producing are Adam Sandler, Tim Herlihy, Judit Maull, Kevin Grady and Eli Thomas for Happy Madison Productions and Molly Sims for Something Happy Productions. In February 2024, Jillian Bell, Will Forte, Damon Wayans Jr., Brianne Howey, and Chris Geere joined the cast. The next month, Alex Moffat, Joel David Moore, Lizze Broadway, Urzila Carlson, and Francis Benhamou had been added.

In February and March 2024, principal photography took place in Brooklyn, New York. Amy Schumer spoke about filming the movie with Brianne Howey, saying that there was at least one emotional scene she shared with the actress. "Bri and I filmed a really special intimate scene sitting on the bathroom floor, and that was the most satisfying day of shooting for me as a woman and an artist," she said. "But don't get it twisted — you will cry-laugh watching this movie."

== Release ==
It was released by Netflix on February 5, 2025. "Kinda Pregnant" was the most-watched title on Netflix during the week of Feb. 3-9, hitting 25.1 million views in its first five days of streaming.

== Reception ==
On the review aggregator website Rotten Tomatoes, 27% of 44 critics' reviews are positive, with an average rating of 2.5/10. The website's consensus reads: "Fitfully amusing and earnest without ever finding a comedic groove, Kinda Pregnant's best efforts can't overcome the issue that its story is kinda icky." Metacritic, which uses a weighted average, assigned the film a score of 38 out of 100, based on 16 critics, indicating "generally unfavorable" reviews.

The Hollywood Reporter's Lovia Gyarkye described the film as "kinda dull". In her view, the film struggles to balance humor with its desired emotional depth regarding views on pregnancy. She felt that the plot was shallow, predictable, and unengaging and that its weak comedy and uninspired execution failed to leave a lasting impression. Similarly, Natalia Winkelman of The New York Times argued that the female characters' personal troubles detract from the movie's comedic moments and felt that their relationships were lackluster and underdeveloped. Isabella Soares of Collider felt what makes this film delightful and purposely cringe is how it sticks to narrative clichés that have worked in the past while making the audience laugh with genuinely funny jokes. Jake Coyle of AP stated Kinda Pregnant is kinda good and a throwback comedy. The San Francisco Chronicle's Mick LaSalle declared: "Amy Schumer delivers laughs. The Netflix film is a lightweight comedy that doesn't aspire to do much other than to incite laughs, but what makes it a little better than merely functional is its willingness to be extreme." . In Variety's review, Owen Gleiberman took it a step further: "Even a commercial comedy that just wants to crack you up can, for a moment, be more than that, that it can reveal a bit of who we are. In "Kinda Pregnant," it's Amy Schumer's go-for-broke honesty that's funny."

== Viewership ==
According to data from Showlabs, Kinda Pregnant ranked first on Netflix in the United States during the week of 3–9 February 2025.

== See also ==
- Labor Pains
