= NGHTCRWLRS =

American rock band

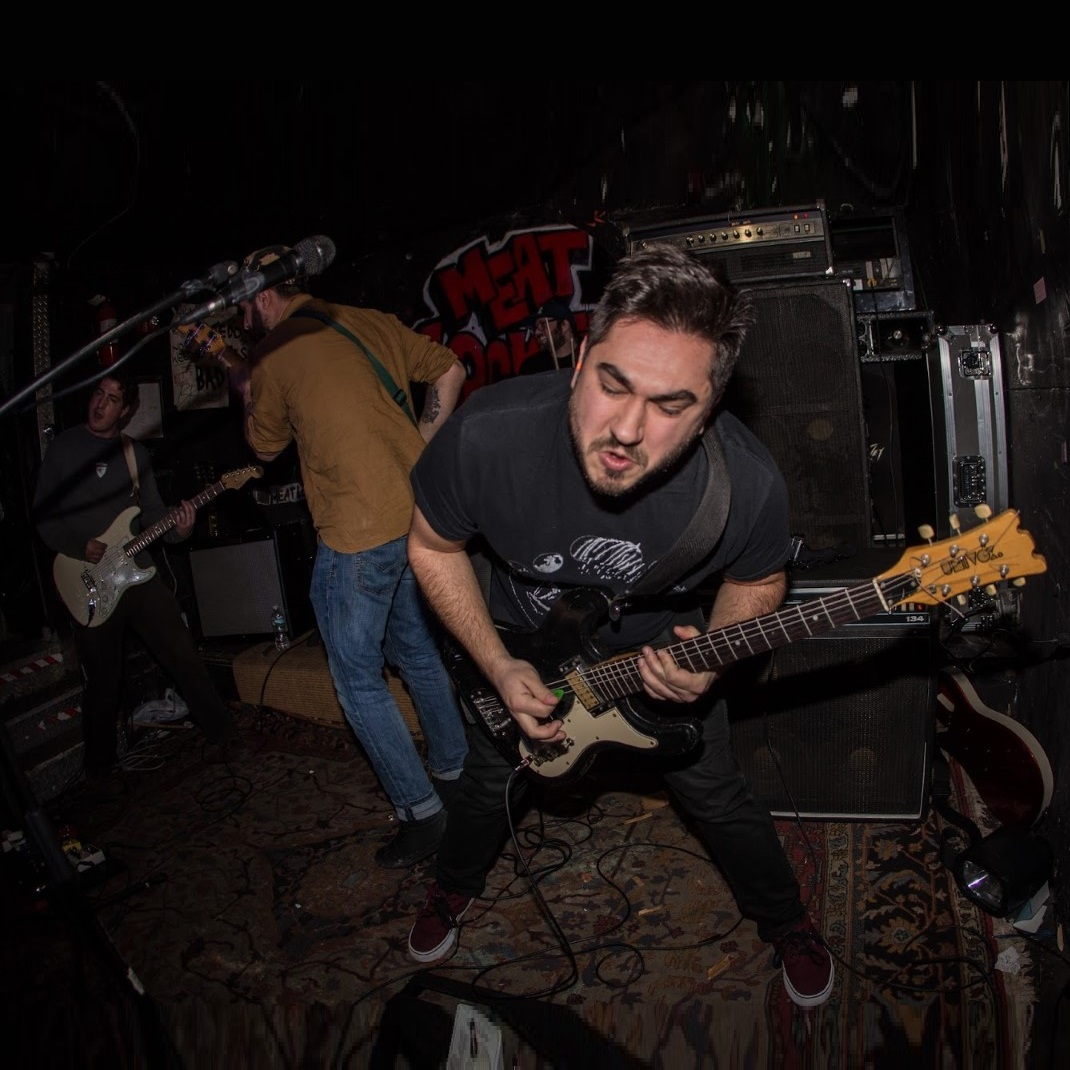
- NGHTCRWLRS live at the Meatlocker in 2016

Background information
- Origin: New Jersey, U.S.
- Genres: Rock
- Years active: 2014–present
- Labels: Sniffling Indie Kids
- Members: Frank DeFranco; Brian Goglia; Eric Goldberg; Max Rauch

NGHTCRWLRS are an American rock band from New Jersey.

== History ==
NGHTCRWLRS are a four-piece indie rock band from North Jersey, that formed in 2014. The band members were in other Hudson County, New Jersey groups; vocalist and guitarist Frank DeFranco played in Holy City Zoo, vocalist and guitarist Eric Goldberg was in the Nico Blues, vocalist and bassist Brian Goglia played in They Had Faces Then and Man on Fire, and vocalist and drummer Max Rauch was in Washington Square Park. In the Jersey Journal DeFranco recalls, that "when we all started sharing a practice space in Clifton[,] it became a place where we all knew and trusted each other, and we all started playing with each other whenever any of us were free." The band draws comparison to the music of Title Fight, Fugazi and Sonic Youth. NGHTCRWLRS' first release is the song "Lt. Dan" for the Sniffling Indie Kids compilation, Space Jamz: 5 Bands 1 Practice Space.

Sniffling Indie Kids released NGHTCRWLRS on February 28, 2015, and the record release party was held that night at The Dopeness in Jersey City, New Jersey, with Cicada Radio, Dentist, and France. The music video for Smiling was released on September 2, 2016, and it contains footage of the band rehearsing and performing. The album ranked No. 9 on The New York Observer's 10 Best Debut Albums of 2015.

NGHTCRWLRS performed at the 2016 North Jersey Indie Rock Festival. Their second album Raging Hot was released by Sniffling Indie Kids on November 11, 2016. It is described as a "mix of abrasive and intense rock anthems and jazzy and mellow tunes."

== Band members ==
- Frank DeFranco – vocals and guitar
- Brian Goglia – vocals and guitar
- Eric Goldberg – vocals and bass
- Max Rauch – vocals and drums

== Discography ==
Albums

- NGHTCRWLRS (2015)
- Raging Hot (2016)

Appearing on

- Space Jamz: 5 Bands 1 Practice Space (2014)
