= Bee Movie (soundtrack) =

2007 film soundtrack album

Bee Movie (Music from the Motion Picture)

Film score by Rupert Gregson-Williams
- Released: October 30, 2007
- Recorded: 2007
- Studios: AIR Studios, London; Abbey Road Studios, London; Angel Recording Studios, London; Remote Control Productions, Santa Monica, California
- Genres: Film score; film soundtrack
- Length: 44:22
- Label: Sony Classical
- Producer: Hans Zimmer

Rupert Gregson-Williams chronology
I Now Pronounce You Chuck & Larry (2007)	Bee Movie (2007)	Made of Honor (2008)

Bee Movie (Music from the Motion Picture) is the soundtrack album to the 2007 DreamWorks Animation film Bee Movie directed by Simon J. Smith and Steve Hickner and featured the voices of Jerry Seinfeld and Renée Zellweger. The album features the film score composed by Rupert Gregson-Williams and two licensed songs heard in the film, and was released through Sony Classical Records on October 30, 2007.

== Background ==
Rupert Gregson-Williams, who previously composed for DreamWorks' Over the Hedge (2006), scored Bee Movie. The score utilized strings and brass themes that would provide a racy and fun-filled atmosphere while also working on a full orchestra for grandeur and dramatic intensity. While the overall sound design was lighthearted, he also focuses on large orchestral themes as well as appropriate instrumentation being utilized for the satire tone of the film. The album also featured the Archies' "Sugar, Sugar" and a cover version of "Here Comes the Sun" by Sheryl Crow.

== Release ==
Sony Classical Records released the 15-song soundtrack on October 30, 2007. An exclusive bonus track was released via iTunes.

== Reception ==
Christian Clemmensen of Filmtracks wrote "As for the contribution by Gregson-Williams and the six other Remote Control composers, Bee Movie is as purely a fun listening experience on album as the aforementioned [John] Powell and Harry Gregson-Williams scores, along with Wallace and Gromit: The Curse of the Were-Rabbit by Julian Nott and other [Hans] Zimmer assistants more recently. The theme in "The Pollen Jocks" is among the most satisfying of the year, and with the four fantastic cues that open this album, Bee Movie is an easy recommendation. The album does slow down in its latter half, and the flow is interrupted briefly by "Sugar Sugar" by The Archies, but you can't help but admire the optimistic energy this score conveys." AllMusic wrote "This bright, upbeat, and brass-heavy score makes no bones about being the musical undergirding of an animated comedy, so listeners seeking a serious and somber symphonic outing will need to look elsewhere."

James Southall of Movie Wave wrote "The two songs do nothing to detract from the overall satisfaction the album brings and, while I know it's all pretty insignificant and certainly not as impressive in a technical sense as the year's standout animations core, Michael Giacchino's Ratatouille, this album ticks all the right boxes in terms of the enjoyment it can bring to the listener - particularly one who is a fan of Powell's music for animations, but more generally it should appeal to anyone who enjoys large-scale orchestral adventure scores. Perhaps it's true that this score earns four stars not as a direct result of its quality, but because it seems like some kind of shining oasis amongst the spartan offerings of the year as a whole, but while you might find many which are more intellectually stimulating, at a basic level you won't find too many more entertaining film score albums released this year." Thomas Glorieux of Maintitles.net wrote "Bee Movie is no small pick either. It is in fact one of the most fun scores of the year and at least several tracks keep returning in my CD player for timeless spins. If Rupert Gregson-Williams can grow the same way his brother Harry did, then I'm sure we haven't heard the last of his bag of tricks yet. Bee Movie is a hoot from start to finish." Brent Simon of Screen International wrote that "Rupert Gregson-Williams' score and some vibrant musical selections" helps in aiding the film.

== Track listing ==
No.	Title	Length
1.	"Graduation"	3:15
2.	"Honex"	2:50
3.	"The Pollen Jocks"	1:32
4.	"Barry Flies Out"	5:35
5.	"Vanessa Intervenes"	2:03
6.	"Sugar Sugar" (The Archies)	2:47
7.	"Assault on Honey Farms"	2:35
8.	"Ken"	2:29
9.	"Barry Turns the Screws"	3:13
10.	"Monty Slanders and Adam Stings"	2:14
11.	"Hearts, Flowers and Hive Closures"	2:36
12.	"Honey Round Up"	1:40
13.	"Rooftop Consequences"	1:52
14.	"Land That Plane"	6:41
15.	"Here Comes the Sun" (Sheryl Crow)	3:00
Total length:		44:22

iTunes exclusive
No.	Title	Length
16.	"Thinkin Bee" (Matthew Broderick and Jerry Seinfeld)	0:57
Total length:		45:19

== Personnel ==
Credits adapted from liner notes:

- Music composer – Rupert Gregson-Williams
- Music producer – Hans Zimmer
- Additional music – Halli Cauthery, Heitor Pereira, Lorne Balfe, Mark Russell, Michael Levine, Ryeland Allison
- Additional arrangements – Graham Preskett
- Music specialist – Laurence Cottle, Tony Clarke
- Technical engineer– Abhay Manusmare, Noah Sorota, Peter 'Oso' Snell, Thomas Broderick
- Assistant engineer – Alex Nutton, Chris Barrett, Jake Jackson, Mat Bartram, Paul Pritchard, Sam Okell
- Recording – Geoff Foster
- Additional recording – Nick Wollage, Rupert Coulson
- Mixing – Alan Meyerson
- Assistant mixing – Greg Vines
- Mastering – Dave Donnelly
- Music editor – J.J. George
- Additional music editor – Kevin Crehan
- Musical assistance – Michael Teoli, Nima Fakhrara, Ryan Leach
- Technical assistance – Jochen Schild
- Music production services – Steven Kofsky
- Music coordinator – Charlene Ann Huang, Jennifer Schiller
- Score preparation – Dakota Music
- Package design – Roxanne Slimak

Orchestra

- Orchestrator – Alastair King, Rupert Gregson-Williams
- Additional orchestration – Bradley Miles, Bruce Fowler, Geoff Alexander, Penka Kouneva, Rick Giovinazzo, Roger May
- Orchestra conductor – Alastair King, Gavin Greenaway, Rupert Gregson-Williams
- Orchestra leader – Thomas Bowes
- Orchestra contractor – Isobel Griffiths Ltd.
- Assistant orchestra contractor – Charlotte Matthews
- Orchestra coordinator – Becky Bentham
- Assistant orchestra coordinator – Nyree Pinder

Instruments

- Baritone saxophone – Jamie Talbot
- Cello – Jonathan Williams
- Choir – Metro Voices
- Clarinet – Nicholas Bucknall
- Double bass – Steve Mair
- Flute – Jonathan Snowden, Nina Robertson
- French horn – Richard Bissill
- Marimba – Frank Ricotti
- Percussion – Gary Kettel, Paul Clarvis, Stephen Henderson
- Piano – Christopher Willis
- Trumpet – Andy Crowley, Daniel Newell, Paul Archibald
- Viola – Bruce White, Rachel Bolt
- Violin – Everton Nelson, Mark Berrow

Choir

- Choir coordinator – Jenny O'Grady
- Bass vocals – Andrew Playfoot, Lawrence Wallington, Michael Dore
- Soprano vocals – Ann De Renais, Anne Marie Cullum, Grace Davidson, Joanna Forbes, Samantha Shaw, Sarah Eyden, Sarah Ryan
- Tenor vocals – Steve Trowell

Management

- Executive in charge of music – Sunny Park
- Marketing director – Rebecca Farrell
- Music business affairs – Dan Butler
- Music clearance – Julie Butchko
- A&R executive – David Lai

== Accolades ==
Award	Date of ceremony	Category	Recipients	Result	Ref.
Annie Awards	February 8, 2008	Music in an Animated Feature Production	Rupert Gregson-Williams	Nominated	
International Film Music Critics Association	February 19, 2008	Best Original Score for an Animated Film	Rupert Gregson-Williams	Nominated	
