= The Week Of =

- Promotional release poster
- Directed by: Robert Smigel
- Written by: Robert Smigel; Adam Sandler
- Produced by: Adam Sandler; Allen Covert
- Starring: Adam Sandler; Chris Rock; Rachel Dratch; Steve Buscemi
- Cinematography: Federico Cesca
- Edited by: Tom Costain
- Music by: Rupert Gregson-Williams
- Production company: Happy Madison Productions
- Distributed by: Netflix
- Release date: April 27, 2018
- Running time: 116 minutes
- Country: United States
- Language: English

The Week Of is a 2018 American comedy film written and directed by Robert Smigel in his feature length directorial debut, and co-written by and starring Adam Sandler. It co-stars Chris Rock, Rachel Dratch, Steve Buscemi, Allison Strong, and Noah Robbins, and follows two fathers the week of the wedding of their children. The film is the fourth collaboration between Sandler and Netflix, and was released on the streaming service on April 27, 2018.

== Plot ==
Sarah Lustig and Tyler Cortice are one week away from getting married. Despite Tyler's doctor father Kirby being extremely rich, Sarah's construction worker father Kenny insists on paying for everything, resulting in a very cheap wedding.

In the week leading up to the wedding, the two families are plagued with multiple problems. Kenny, in an attempt to impress Kirby, tries to get his hotel room made over to look more fancy. The incompetence of the staff results in damage to the other rooms where other members of the family are staying, forcing the Lustigs to let them stay at their house, already crowded with their own family. To make matters worse, the hotel is where the reception is held, and the damage from the poor work threatens it. Despite this, Kenny firmly refuses any help from Kirby, insisting on doing everything by himself.

Due to a misunderstanding, Kenny's elderly uncle Seymour is mistaken for a World War II veteran (he never actually fought). To help save face after accusations from the press, Kenny convinces the mayor to hold the reception, in the guise of a party in Seymour's honor, at City Hall. However, when Seymour dies in an accident during Tyler's bachelor party, Kenny is forced to admit that the legs everyone thought Seymour lost in combat were actually lost to diabetes. This gets back to the mayor, who cancels the party. To cover this, Kenny, his wife Debbie and Seymour's son Charles capture a bunch of bats and dump them down the chimney of City Hall.

The day of the wedding arrives and despite everything, the ceremony goes off without a hitch. During the reception, Kirby confronts Kenny over his behavior and helps him realize that he did it all out of a need to do one more thing for his daughter. They have this talk while being held up during a dance for a long time, and one of the carriers collapses, spilling water which hits the electronics, starting a fire.

Feeling awful, Kenny admits why he did the things he did to Sarah, who forgives him. The rest of the reception is held at the Lustig house and Kenny and Kirby agree that the latter should pay for the first big family vacation.

== Cast ==
- Adam Sandler as Kenny Lustig
- Chris Rock as Kirby Cortice
- Rachel Dratch as Debbie Lustig
- Steve Buscemi as Charles
- Allison Strong as Sarah Lustig
- Chloe Himmelman as Rose Lustig
- Katie Hartman as Robin
- Jake Lippmann as Isaac Lustig
- Scott Cohen as Ron Elliman
- Melanie Nicholls-King as Katrina
- Jorge Luna as Ignacio
- Noah Robbins as Noah
- Maury Ginsberg as Jay
- Liz Larsen as Julia Katz
- Patricia Belcher as Thelma
- Teddy Coluca as Dominic
- Jim Barone as Seymour
- Suzanne Shepherd as Aunt Iris
- Roland Buck III as Tyler Cortice
- Garry Pastore as Mayor John Barone
- Rob Morgan as Cousin Marvin
- Germar Terrell Gardner as Cousin Ethridge
- Chuck Nice as Leonard
- Kenajuan Bentley as Jermaine
- Joel Marsh Garland as Kent, The Magician
- Robert Smigel as ER Doctor
- Dan Patrick as Baseball Coach
- Ronnie "The Limo Driver" Mund as The Pallbearer
- June Gable as Roberta
- Jared Sandler as Jared
- Jackie Sandler as Lisa

== Production ==
Principal photography began on Long Island, New York, in July 2017.

== Reception ==
The film received negative reviews from critics. On review aggregator website Rotten Tomatoes, the film holds an approval rating of 26% based on 27 reviews, and an average rating of 4.1/10. The site's critical consensus reads, "The Week Of suggests promise in further collaborations between Sandler and Robert Smigel, but its shopworn premise and listless execution aren't enough to recommend it." On Metacritic, the film has a weighted average score of 41 out of 100, based on 11 critics, indicating "mixed or average reviews".

Richard Roeper of the Chicago Sun-Times gave the film 1.5 out of 4 stars, calling it lazy and saying: "Sandler gives a relatively restrained performance as the well-meaning dad. Rock seems barely invested in paying attention to the other actors, and reads his lines as if he’s hoping there won’t be another take and he won’t have to go through this again. Even with helpful title cards telling us it’s 'MONDAY,' 'TUESDAY,' etc., etc., this is a week that feels 10 days long." Peter Debruge, writing for Variety, called the film "lazy and overlong" and said: "Back in autopilot mode, Sandler phones in what may qualify as the lowest-concept comedy of his career—which, thankfully, is not the same as the lowest point in his career (that would be Jack and Jill, the cross-dressing debacle that began the downward slide that landed him at Netflix in the first place)."
