= Raging Hot =

Studio album by NGHTCRWLRS
- Released: November 11, 2016
- Genre: Indie rock
- Length: 34:49
- Label: Sniffling Indie Kids
- Producer: Jeremy Cimino

NGHTCRWLRS chronology
NGHTCRWLRS (2015)	Raging Hot (2016)

Raging Hot is the second studio album from the American rock band NGHTCRWLRS.

== Content ==
The eight-track album was released on compact disc and digitally with Sniffling Indie Kids, on November 11, 2016. It was recorded and engineered by Max Rauch, at their rehearsal space in Clifton, New Jersey, and mixed and mastered by Jeremy Cimino. Raging Hot is described as a mix of abrasive and intense rock anthems and jazzy and mellow tunes, and a Pirate! press release calls the album "90s indie rock from an alternate universe[,] funky 80s glam combine[d] with all manner of psychedelia and noise." In an interview The Jersey Journal, DeFranco details the songwriting, saying "it's all guitar-driven music, but we went through a bit of a Talking Heads phase as we were writing it so that kind of comes through." The band describes Raging Hot as "four gentlemen from New Jersey who are deeply in love with music but completely frustrated by the mundane realities of modern life and use those emotions to create something fun." It draws comparison to the music of Sunny Day Real Estate, Title Fight, Fugazi, and Sonic Youth.

The lead single, "Are Two Dee Too," was released on October 21, 2016, which Goldberg explains as "finding your place in the world and contribute to making it better for everyone despite all of the terrible, horrifying things that happen all over, every day." The second single, "Coffee and Weed," was released on November 3, 201. The third single, which focuses on modern capitalism, "Fear and Greed," was released November 10, 2016.

NGHTCRWLRS celebrated the release of Raging Hot with two shows, one at Bloomfield, New Jersey's underground venue Cat Circus on November 11, 2016, and the other at Sunnyvale in Brooklyn, New York City, on November 12, 2016.

== Reception ==
Speak Into My Good Eye editor Mike Mehalick calls Raging Hot "ebbs of hard-charging riffage and flows of more angular instrumentation," and New Noise says the album is "bristling with incendiary energy and urgency."

Motif calls "Are Two Dee Too" a "mellow song[,] but the chorus is hard-hitting and emotional [with] DeFranco's and Goldbrg's guitars unleash electrifying fury that's contagious" according to Motif. Impose says the song "takes you back to some classic 90's rock with its early guitar riff, building up momentum as the instrumentals layer in," adding that "it's a bit of a melancholic song, laced with hope despite its heavy subject." Elmore describes the song "Fear and Greed as "strained vocals press into melodic guitar and a Strokes-leaning bassline [and] suddenly, halfway through, the track breaks down into a distorted chaos, wailing guitars reflecting the band's political message."

== Track listing ==
No.	Title	Length
1.	"Are Two Dee Too"	4:10
2.	"Coffee and Weed"	1:05
3.	"Disco Diva"	3:28
4.	"Losers"	2:31
5.	"Fear and Greed"	5:21
6.	"Quart Inch Cable"	1:10
7.	"Rot"	4:07
8.	"Lot Lizard"	4:35
9.	"Weed and Coffee"	2:52
10.	"Waiting..."	5:30
Total length:		34:49

== Personnel ==
- Frank DeFranco – vocals and guitar
- Brian Goglia – vocals and guitar
- Eric Goldberg – vocals and bass
- Max Rauch – vocals and drums
