= Allison Strong =

American singer and actress

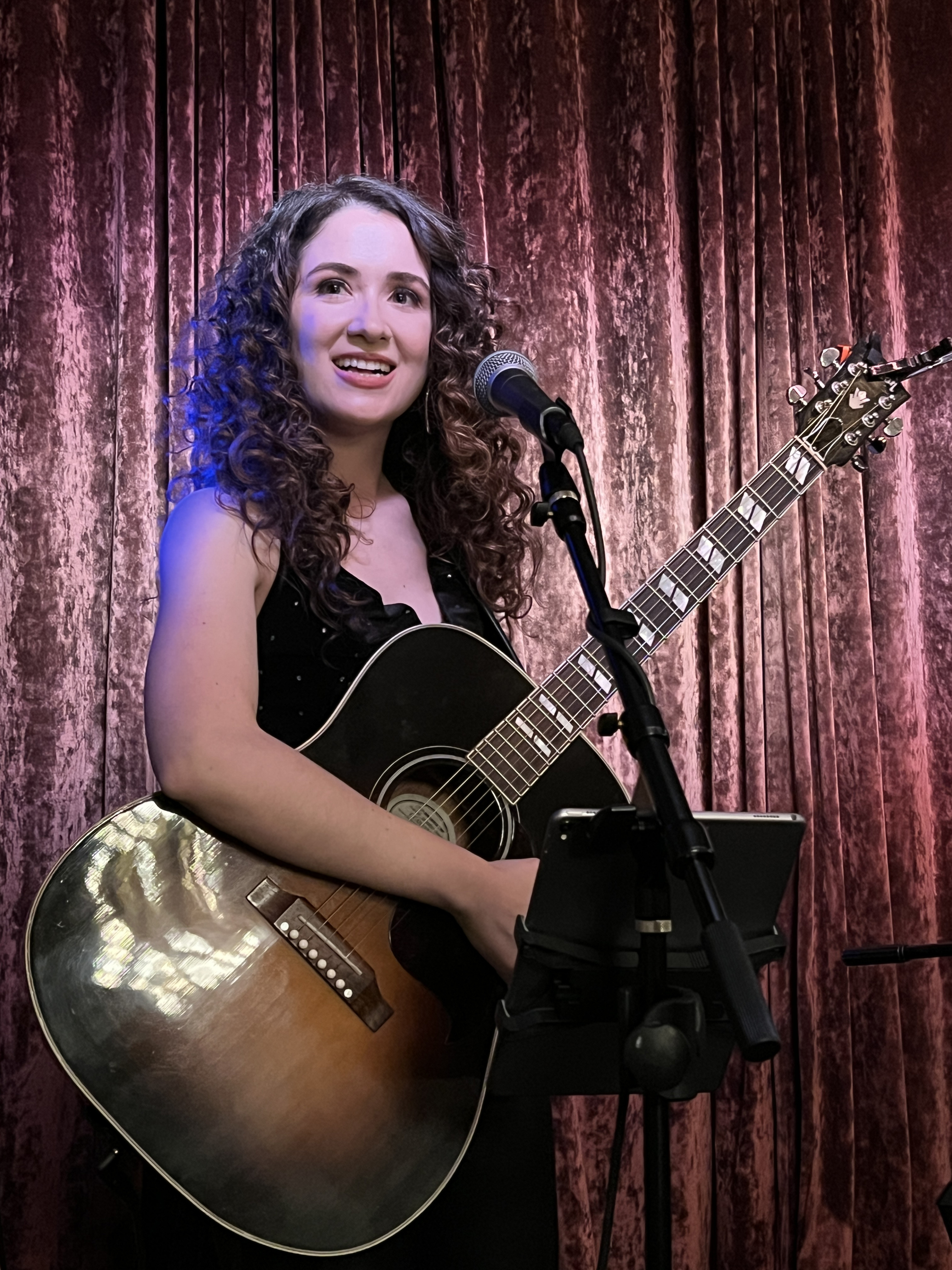
- Strong at a May 11, 2024 performance in Jersey City, New Jersey

Background information
- Born: Allison Trujillo Strong
- Origin: Union City, New Jersey, U.S.
- Occupations: Actress, singer, songwriter
- Years active: 1999–present
- Website: www.allisonstrong.com

Allison Trujillo Strong is an American pop singer, songwriter, and actress. She first gained notice for her Broadway work in the musicals Bye Bye Birdie and Mamma Mia!, has done voice-over work on the Nickelodeon's animated children's television program Dora and Friends, and appeared in other television series such as The Blacklist, and The Marvelous Mrs. Maisel. She gained wider exposure with her first feature film, playing Adam Sandler's daughter Sarah in The Week Of (2018).

Strong began acting at age 7, and won a national jingle-singing competition for Oscar Mayer at age 11. She appeared in local productions in and around her home of Union City, New Jersey since childhood, in venues such as the Park Performing Arts Center and Montclair State University, where she majored in musical theater. She is also a poetry reciter. She has performed at the New Jersey Performing Arts Center and on the morning TV show Good Morning America, for numerous governors of New Jersey, as well as at the White House and for Colombian President Álvaro Uribe. A Colombian American herself, she writes and performs vocals in both English and Spanish, and composes on both piano and acoustic guitar.

Strong's debut, dual-language album, March Towards the Sun, was released August 31, 2014 to positive reviews. In 2015, she played Ado Annie Carnes in an Annandale-on-Hudson, New York production of Oklahoma!, for which she garnered praise by The New York Times.

== Early life and career ==
Allison Trujillo Strong was born in Hoboken, New Jersey. She grew up in Union City, where her mother worked for 39 years as a school psychologist for the Union City Board of Education before her retirement.

Her great-grandfather, Rubén, who died in the 1940s, made his living in Colombia as a poet for the national periodical El Colombiano, an activity in which Strong herself developed a strong interest and connection to him. As a child, some of her earliest creative influences came from the Colombian folk songs and poetry that her grandparents, Soledad and Carlos, taught her at the dinner table. Strong grew up in a Spanish-speaking household and spoke only Spanish until an incident in a store. As Strong explains, "A woman yelled at my mother and told her that she should be ashamed of herself for not teaching me English, since I'd need it in school...From that point on, she only spoke to me in English. But once I got to high school, I decided to throw myself into the English as a Second Language program and took Spanish classes with all of the kids who had just come to this country, and it forced me to learn."

At age three, Strong was given a dollar store microphone with an echo function, which kindled her interest in singing. At age seven, her mother, Patricia Trujillo, addressed Strong's shyness by enrolling her in acting classes at the John Harms Center for the Arts (now the Bergen Performing Arts Center) in Englewood. From grades 1 - 8, Strong attended Woodrow Wilson School (now known as Sara M. Gilmore), an arts-integrated school in Weehawken, where she studied drama under Joseph D. Conklin.

Strong began her singing career in the contest circuit at age 9, when she won New Jersey Network (NJN)'s Hispanic Youth Showcase with the first show tune she ever learned, "Much More" from The Fantasticks. She would go on to win that competition three times, later hosting an Emmy-winning show for the channel. At age 10, Strong joined the Park Players of Union City, an acting troupe based out of Union City's Park Performing Arts Center. She received professional vocal training, and learned to sing opera, eventually becoming member of the Metropolitan Opera Children's Chorus.

In November 2001, 11-year-old Strong was selected from more than 2,000 entries and 10 finalists as the winner of Oscar Mayer's second Concurso Cantando Hasta La Fama ("Sing for the Fame") contest, in which she sang the brand's jingle in Spanish. Her victory earned her the opportunity to appear in a national Oscar Mayer commercial and $20,000 toward her college fund.

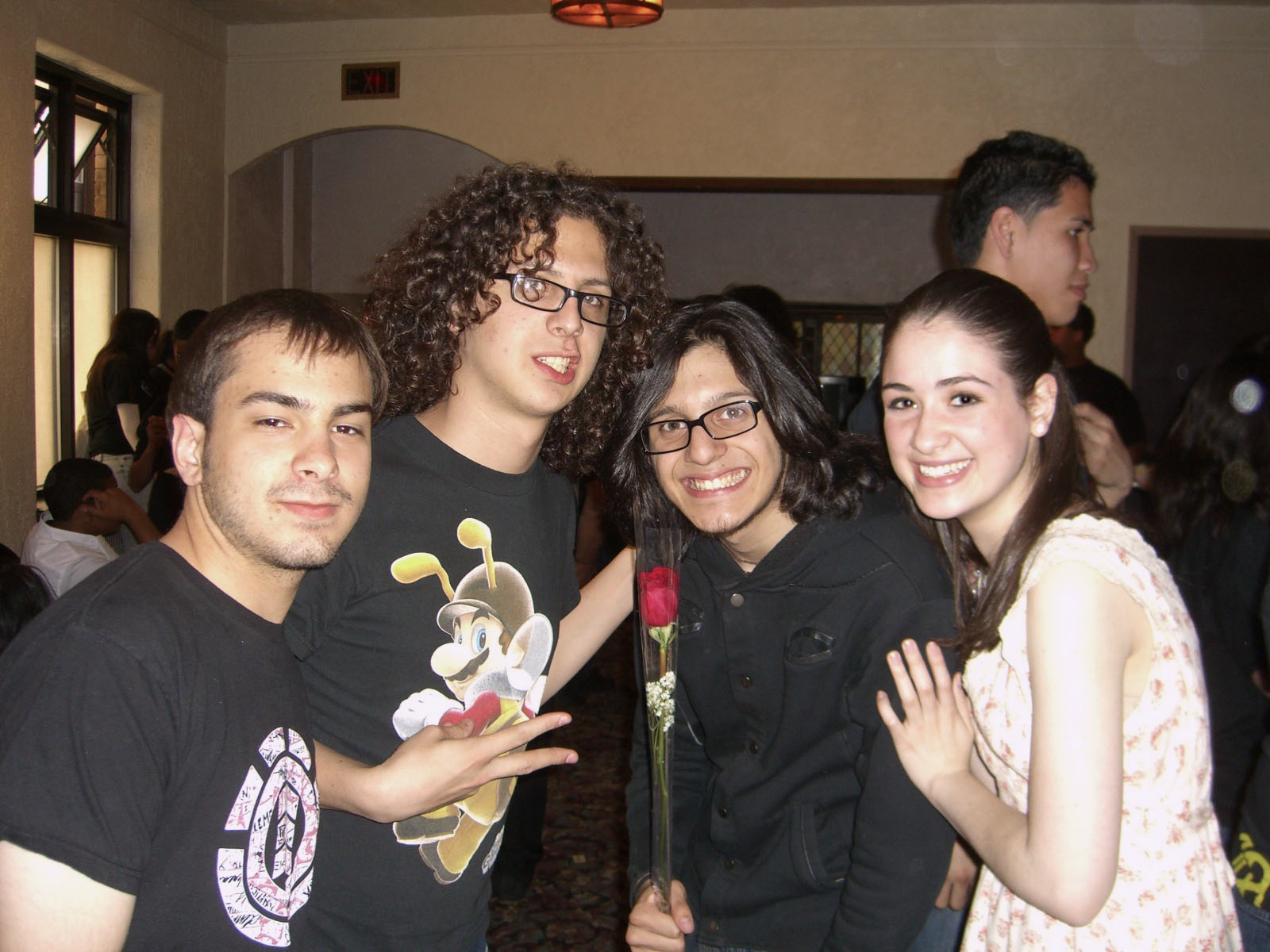
Strong, at right, with fellow students at the 2008 Union City Multi-Arts Festival at the Park Performing Arts Center

Her first lead role was at age 12 as Dorothy Gale in her school's production of The Wizard of Oz. The same year she appeared in the Metropolitan Opera's Carmen.

By age 13 Strong appeared in the Park Players' May 20, 2004 production of You're a Good Man, Charlie Brown, her fifth production with the Park Players. That same year Strong was one of 48 participants selected statewide for NJPAC's sixth annual Summer Youth Performance Workshop Showcase program, which features the state's most gifted performing arts students.

On April 7 and 8, 2006, Strong, while a sophomore at Union Hill High School, appeared in the school's production of Annie Get Your Gun.

On March 27, 2008, Strong won the statewide Poetry Out Loud competition, a contest sponsored by the National Endowment for the Arts (NEA) and the Poetry Foundation, in which students recited and performed poems of their choosing. Strong beat over 5,000 students from 44 high schools and one home-schooled student. Strong earned $1,500 in scholarship and awards, and praise from the judges, who noted, "Strong elegantly relates the mounting tone from astute humor to quiet triumph." Strong's performance of the William Shakespeare sonnet “My Mistress’ Eyes are Nothing Like the Sun” appears as the fifth segment of a DVD compilation of the 2006 – 2007 finals that was released that November for schools and teachers.

In June 2008, Strong graduated from high school, where she was that school's final salutatorian before it was converted to Union Hill Middle School. Following graduation, she attended the Cali School of Music at Montclair State University, where she majored in musical theater.

In September 2008, Strong participated in the NEA's Sixth Annual Poetry Pavilion at the National Book Festival. On March 28 and April 5, 2009 she played Jo March in a production of Little Women at the Studio Playhouse in Montclair, New Jersey.

== Professional career ==
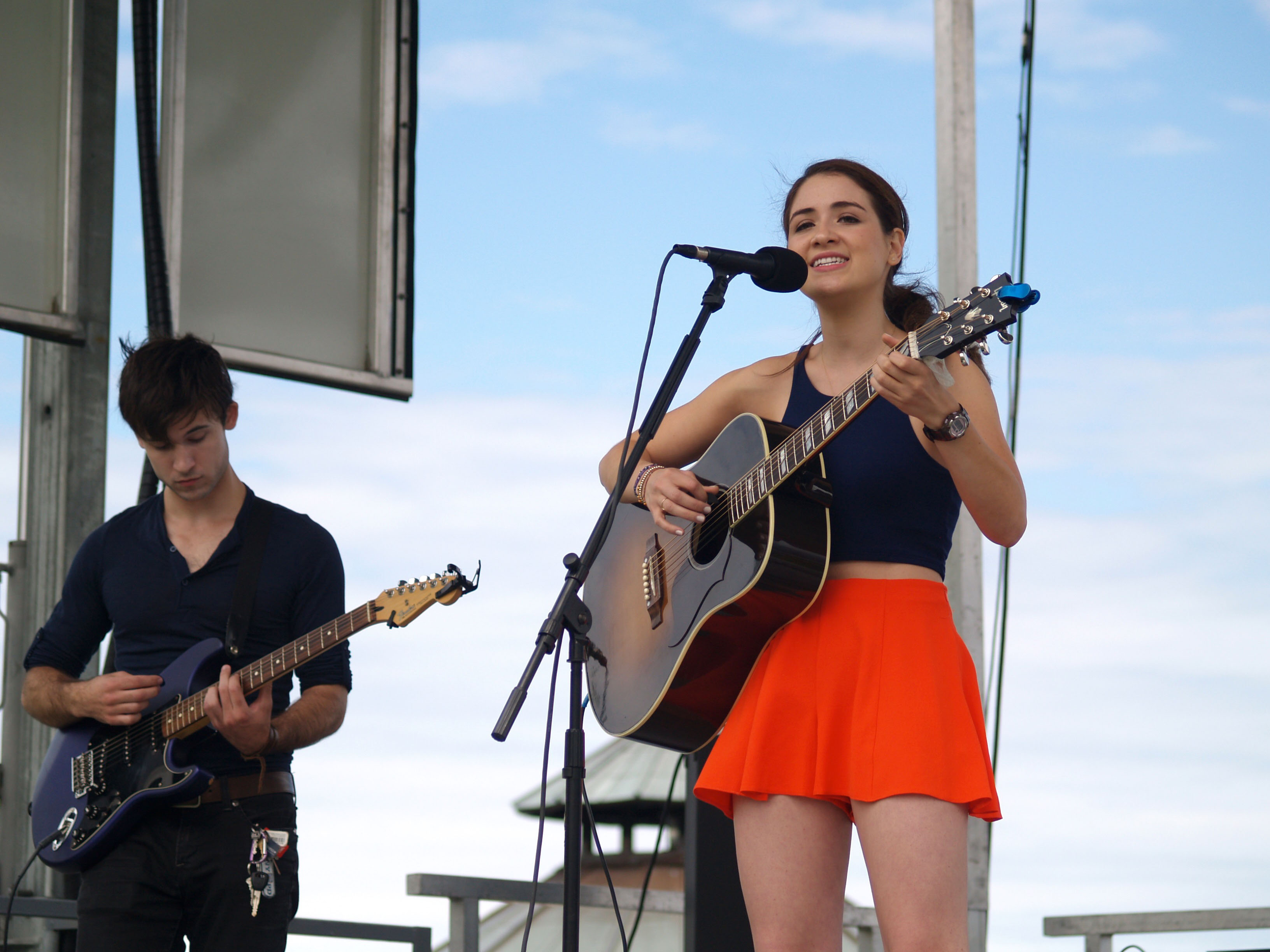
Strong and Marrick Smith perform at the 2014 Lackawanna Music Festival in Hoboken, New Jersey.

In 2009, Strong read about an open casting call in an issue of Backstage for a production of Bye Bye Birdie. Strong slept on the street for hours in a sleeping bag in front of the Roundabout Theatre Company in order to audition, an act that she saw as the start of her professional career. On May 5, 2009, on the same day Strong's maternal grandmother died in Colombia, came the bittersweet news that Strong was cast in the ensemble, as a member of the chorus and in the role of Helen Miller, one of the friends of the cast's female lead, Kim McAfee. The show, which starred John Stamos, was produced at the Henry Miller's Theatre in Manhattan, and debuted on October 15 of that year, marking Strong's Broadway debut. Commented Strong, "I'm making my Broadway debut at the same age Julie Andrews and Liza Minnelli did. To get my big break so young…is a little frightening, but it assures me that performing is what I was born to do.” Strong took a six-month break from school in order to focus on rehearsals. To promote the show, Strong and her castmates performed their rendition of the song “Honestly Sincere” on the morning TV show Good Morning America.

In 2010, during her freshman year at Montclair, Strong was a writer for Backstage magazine's "Take 5" column. By 2010, Strong had performed solo for every governor of New Jersey since Christie Todd Whitman, as well as at the White House for President George W. Bush, and for Colombian President Álvaro Uribe.

On May 27, 2011, Strong sang at the New Jersey Performing Arts Center's Victoria Theater as part of the 2011 NJN Hispanic Youth Showcase, in celebration of the Showcase's 25th anniversary, and in honor of the Showcase's first participants and the memory of music teacher Perla Espinal. The show was broadcast on NJN on June 29, 2011.

June 2011 saw the debut of Perks, a musical webseries described by Playbill as "Glee meets Wii", in which Strong stars as Courtney, the object of affection for geeky high school gamer Josh (Alex Wyse), the series’ male lead, who is too shy to express his feelings to her.

In August 2011, Strong auditioned for the Broadway musical Mamma Mia!, on the advice of Bye Bye Birdie's musical director. A week later she was cast as a temporary replacement for a cast member who had suffered a concussion. Strong sang all 23 songs in the production, learned multiple dance numbers, and was the understudy for Ali, the supportive best friend of the show's main character, Sophie.

On June 2, 2012, Strong sang the American National Anthem and the Colombian National Anthem at the opening of Union City's Columbia Park, which celebrated the city's Colombian American population, before a crowd that included Union City Mayor Brian P. Stack and the city's Commissioners.

In 2013 Strong was one of 14 applicants selected to attend the week-long Johnny Mercer Foundation Songwriter's Project at Northwestern University in Chicago, a workshop for promising American songwriters. That July Strong played Captain Jess Hartline in the off-Broadway play Volleygirls, for which Strong and her fellow cast members were given the 2013 NYMF Award for Excellence for Outstanding Ensemble Performance at the New York Musical Theatre Festival. The following month saw the release of Strong's debut EP album, Rewind, a 12-track record described by Playbill as an "eclectic fusion of Latin, country-folk and piano rock." In analyzing the title track "Rewind", whose lyrics describe making amends with a lover, Katie Lebert of Gadfly Online stated, "In her revealing chorus 'Can I apologize for what I have realized?', Strong accurately encapsulates the guilt and indecision we may face near the end of a failing relationship. A truthful, memorable track, Strong immediately proves that sincerity and emotion."

In November 2013, Strong won the Top Female Solo and People's Choice awards at the Hoboken Music Awards. The following month she performed at Rockwood Music Hall in Manhattan.

On January 12, 2014, she performed at Pianos on Manhattan's Lower East Side. On August 23 that same year, she performed at the fourth annual Lackawanna Music Festival, an independent music event held in Hoboken, New Jersey. Not long after, actor/director/producer Diego Luna flew Strong to Bogotá, Colombia to appear in an episode of Back Home, a documentary TV series on the Fusion network that follows a different celebrity guest each week on "an intimate and emotional voyage to their family's country of origin." Strong subsequently appeared in Under My Skin, a comedy written by Robert Sternin and Prudence Fraser, who were the creative forces behind TV series such as Who's The Boss? and The Nanny. The show opened May 15, 2014 at the Little Shubert Theatre.

Strong's debut, dual-language album, March Towards the Sun, was released August 31, 2014 on iTunes, Amazon, Google Play and Spotify. Katie Lebert of Gadfly Online called the first single, "One and Only" "beautiful", referred to the title track "Hacia el Sol" as "truly anthemic", and praised Strong's rendition of the song "Pueblito Viejo" as a "captivating, nostalgic song showcases Allison’s Colombian roots, as well the depth and range of her voice." Of the album overall, Lebert said, "Her truthful, relatable lyrics shine with Broadway strength vocals as she is accompanied by a symphonic variety of instruments and styles. Varying between catchy, carefree songs to emotional ballads to Latin inspired, romantic melodies, Hacia el Sol is undoubtedly one of the strongest, most unique albums I have listened to this year." The album was also praised by Neil Mach of Raw Ramp magazine, who commented, "Allison's vocals are thoroughbred. And the clever lyrics are well articulated. With a ripple of real meat running through their veins." Mach called "One and Only" "wonderful", and mused, "Allison shows, with this song, that folk music does not necessarily have to be all about fragility, flippy-floppy hippiness or floating fluffiness. She proves that folk songs can be supplied with drive and determination. And with business attitude."

August 2014 also saw the premiere of Nickelodeon's animated children's television program Dora and Friends, on which Strong provided the voices of villagers in an episode that aired that year. She subsequently voiced Farmer Dog and the Doggie Land Dogs in two episodes that aired in 2015.

In 2015, Strong played Ado Annie Carnes in an Annandale-on-Hudson, New York production of Oklahoma!, for which she sang "I Cain't Say No". Her work garnered praise by Ben Brantley of The New York Times, who called her performance "captivating".

On June 16, 2023, Strong released her next album, the six-track Brontë, which features the single "La luna". The accompanying music video was produced by Brett Parnell and featured Stanley Martin, an alumnus of the musical Aladdin. That November 17, Strong performed songs from Brontë when she opened for Leann Rimes at Bergen Performing Arts Center in Englewood, New Jersey.

=== Wider exposure in television, film, and voice work ===
On February 4, 2016 Strong appeared in "Alistair Pitt", the 13th episode of the third season of the NBC crime thriller TV series The Blacklist. In the episode, Strong plays Alicia Vacarro, the daughter of a mafia boss who agrees to be married off to the son of a rival mafia family in order to avert a mob war.

Strong gained wider exposure with her first feature film role, playing Sarah, the daughter of Adam Sandler's character, in the 2018 Netflix film The Week Of, which was directed by Robert Smigel, and which garnered her the "Homegrown Music Video" award at the Garden State Film Festival in New Jersey.

Later that year, she guest-starred as Talia Goldstein in the Amazon Video series The Marvelous Mrs. Maisel, appearing as Talia Goldstein in the fourth and fifth episodes of the second season.

In 2023, Strong provided the voice for Mrs. Salinas in the animated Netflix film Leo, reuniting her with Adam Sandler. Strong said of the experience, "I played his daughter in The Week Of. Joining this team is like being back with my family again because right before the pandemic, we released that film. Then, the pandemic happened and then we started recording this. I found out about it in September 2020, so it's been over three years; just wild. It's a crazy cast, but more than anything, it's a crazy amazing group of nice and kind people to work with, and I'm very grateful to them." As the film is a musical, Strong sang musical numbers in the film, for which John Daniel Tangalin, reviewing the film for The Cinema Spot, wrote, "Even the main 5th-grade teacher, Mrs. Salinas (voiced by Allison Strong), while not as present—and for good reason in her case—, is laugh-out-loud hilarious despite not trying to be, and Strong has such a heavenly voice when in a state of singing."

On November 19, 2026, Rockstar Games and Take Two Interactive released the video game Grand Theft Auto VI, which featured a number of Broadway actors providing voice roles, including Strong.

=== Teaching ===
Like her mother, Strong worked in the school system, mentioning in a 2023 interview that she had served as a substitute teacher years prior. She has also worked as a teaching artist, doing Broadway master classes.

== Style and influences ==
Strong says she works to honor her roots in her music, explaining that the Colombian culture that played a part in her upbringing influenced her music as an adult, saying, "I'm a Latin-inspired American folk singer-songwriter. I grew up singing Colombian folk songs because my grandparents taught me [them]." She writes and performs vocals in both English and Spanish, and composes on both piano and acoustic guitar, having initially exhibited a guitar-driven country style, before later shifting more towards piano accompaniments. Her music draws inspiration from pop, country and Latino music, and she has compared its sound to that of Sara Bareilles, whom she cites as an influence. Aside from her grandmother, other influences Strong has cited include Zoraya, Carlos Vives, Shakira, and Fonseca. She has also expressed an admiration for Latin artists like Laura Pausini, Carlos Vives, Jesse & Joy, and Soraya, as well as American artists such as Ingrid Michaelson, India.Arie, Aloe Blacc, Alison Krauss, and Taylor Swift.

Aside from solo performances, Strong is part of a studio band that includes fellow Jersey musicians Alex Brumel on guitar, Eric Novod on percussion and Erik Kase Romero on bass.

== Personal life ==
Strong's favorite authors include Emily Dickinson, Mitch Albom, and Jane Austen. She enjoys baking, playing the piano, performing the national anthem at events, and hosting a show on a local television channel.

== Awards and accolades ==
- 2008 New Jersey Poetry Out Loud
- Top Female Solo artist, 2013 Hoboken Music Award
- People's Choice award, 2013 Hoboken Music Award
- 2013 NYMF Award for Excellence for Outstanding Ensemble Performance (for Volleygirls, shared with rest of cast)
- 2019 Garden State Film Festival Rising Star
