= NGHTCRWLRS (album) =

Studio album by NGHTCRWLRS
- Released: 28 February 2015
- Genre: Indie rock
- Length: 27:55
- Label: Sniffling Indie Kids
- Producer: Jeremy Cimino

NGHTCRWLRS chronology
NGHTCRWLRS (2015)	Raging Hot (2016)

NGHTCRWLRS is the debut studio album from the American rock band NGHTCRWLRS.

== Content ==
The eight-track album was released on compact disc and digital download with Sniffling Indie Kids, on 28 February 2015. It was recorded and engineered by Max Rauch, at their rehearsal space in Clifton, New Jersey, and mixed and mastered by Jeremy Cimino. A Pirate! press release calls NGHTCRWLRS "stunningly psychedelic while still capturing the emotional wreckage of being a twenty-something person unsure of the world and your place in it," and it draws comparison to the music of Brand New, early Sonic Youth, Pavement, and Pink Floyd. The music video for "Smiling" released on 2 September 2016, and it contains footage of the band rehearsing and performing.

The record release party was held at The Dopeness in Jersey City, New Jersey, with Cicada Radio, Dentist, and France.

== Reception ==
The New York Observer notes "Smiling" and "You're Living the Life" are redolent of Cymbals Eat Guitars, and "Red Beans and Rice" has a "bluesy din" and "vocals like those of Mike Patton in Faith No More." It ranked No. 9 on their 10 Best Debut Albums of 2015. Speak Into My Good Eye calls "Smiling" "the greatest Emo anthem Grouplove never wrote," and describe it as "unsettling, as discussions of fabricated cheshire grins take hold, guarding friends and family from the painful poetics delivered over a quiet-loud cacophony of reverberant pop arrangements."

== Track listing ==
No.	Title	Length
1.	"Smiling"	4:26
2.	"You're Living the Life"	3:08
3.	"Death Invented Time"	3:58
4.	"Red Beans and Rice"	2:53
5.	"The Amish Don't Wear Jordans"	3:39
6.	"Homies"	1:44
7.	"Insert Name Here"	3:00
8.	"Reclusive Me"	5:07
Total length:		27:55

== Personnel ==
- Frank DeFranco – vocals and guitar
- Brian Goglia – vocals and guitar
- Eric Goldberg – vocals and bass
- Max Rauch – vocals and drums
