= Molly Sims =

American actress (born 1973)

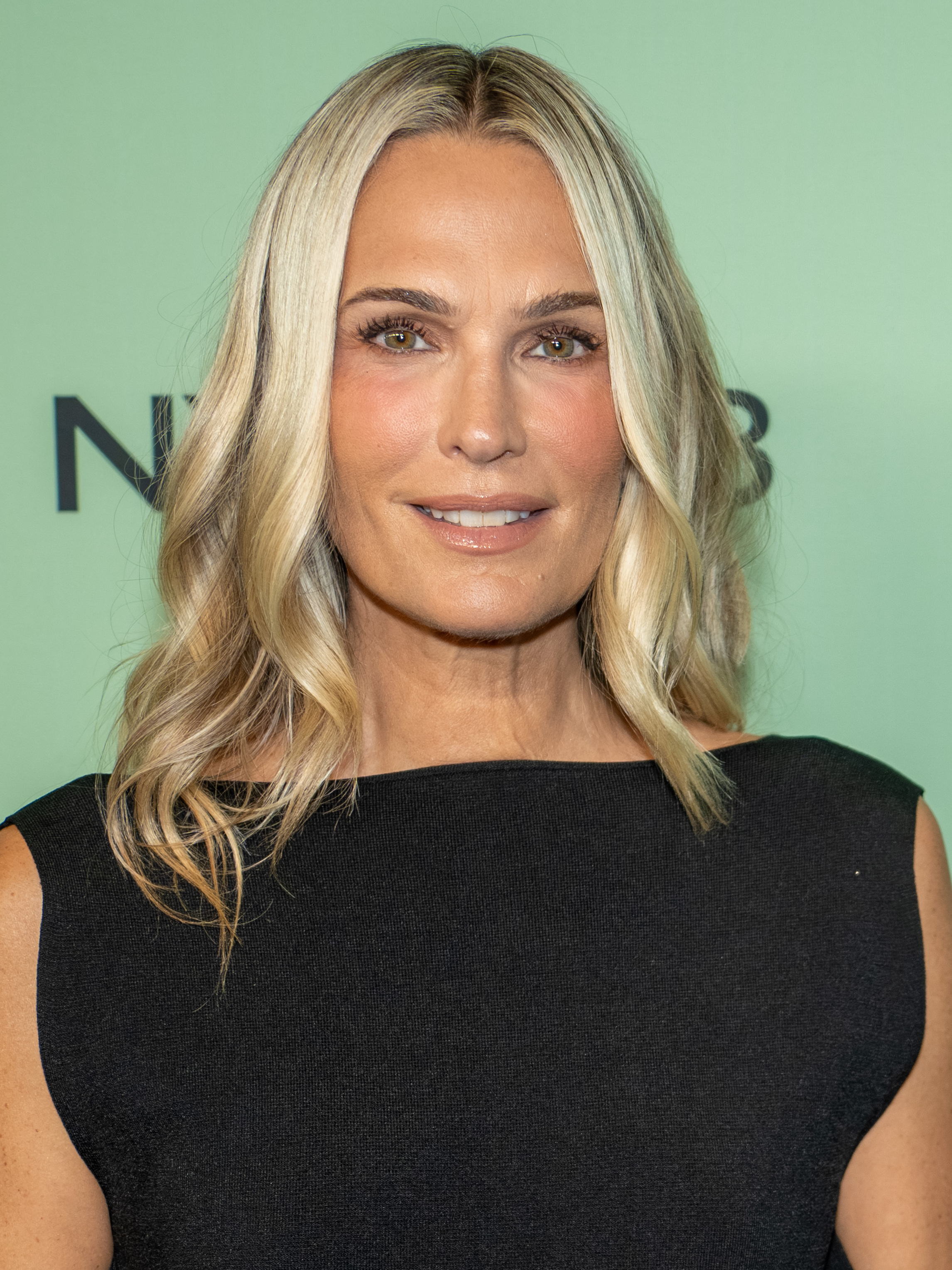
- Sims at the 2025 New York Film Festival
- Born: May 25, 1973 (age 53); Murray, Kentucky, U.S.
- Occupations: Model; actress
- Years active: 1995–present
- Spouse: Scott Stuber (m. 2011)
- Children: 3
- Modeling information
- Height: 1.77 m (5 ft 9 1/2 in)
- Agency: Next Model Management (New York, Paris, Milan, London, Los Angeles, Miami); View Management (Barcelona)
- Website: Official website

Molly Sims (born May 25, 1973) is an American fashion model and actress. She was featured in campaigns for Jimmy Choo, Escada, Giorgio Armani, Michael Kors, and Chanel, among others. She frequently modeled for the Sports Illustrated swimsuit issue in the early 2000s and walked the runway for the annual Victoria's Secret Fashion Show in 2001.

As an actress, she portrayed Delinda Deline in NBC's comedy-drama series Las Vegas (2003–2008), and the "right Missy" in The Wrong Missy (2020).

== Early life and education ==
Molly Sims was born on May 25, 1973, to Jim and Dottie Sims. As a child she lived in Mayfield, Kentucky, then moved to Murray, Kentucky, so that her father could continue working for his book company. She has an older brother. Following her graduation from Murray High School in 1991, Sims enrolled in Vanderbilt University to study political science. In 1993, when Sims was 19 years old, she dropped out to pursue a career in modeling. At Vanderbilt, she was a member of Delta Delta Delta.

== Career ==
=== Modeling ===
After sending her photos to a few modeling agencies, Sims got signed to Next Models Management in New York City.

She was featured on the cover of Vogue Spain's April 1997 issue and Vogue Paris' September 1999 issue. In 2001, Sims became an official spokesmodel for Old Navy, appearing in advertisements known for using the tag line "You gotta get this look!" Sims walked the runway for the annual Victoria's Secret Fashion Show in 2001 and the following year she landed a multiyear contract with CoverGirl. She has also appeared on the runway for Veronique Leroy, Jerome L'Huillier, Givenchy, Ann Demeulemeester, and Emanuel Ungaro. She has graced the cover of numerous fashion magazines, including Ocean Drive, Lucky, Marie Claire, Elle, Cosmopolitan, Allure, Glamour, Shape, Self, and Vanidades.

She appeared in the Sports Illustrated swimsuit issue in 2000, 2001, 2002, 2004, and 2006; in the 2006 issue, she appeared in a photo wearing a bikini designed by Susan Rosen worth $30 million that was made of diamonds.

In 2004, Sims launched Grayce by Molly Sims, a jewelry line consisting of necklaces, earrings, rings, and bracelets. The collection is available at HSN, Henri Bendel, Scoop, Ron Herman, and Matches London.

=== Acting ===
She has appeared as a hostess for MTV's House of Style (2000–02) and Lifetime's Project Accessory (2011), a spin-off of the series Project Runway. Sims appeared in the music videos for Moby's "We Are All Made of Stars" (2002) and The Lonely Island's "Jizz in My Pants" (2008).

Sims portrayed Delinda Deline in NBC's comedy-drama series Las Vegas (2003–2008), which focused on a team of people working at the fictional Montecito Resort and Casino dealing with issues that arise within the working environment. The series concluded after five seasons on February 15, 2008. Sims had guest roles on several television shows, such as Crossing Jordan, The Twilight Zone, Andy Richter Controls the Universe, Royal Pains, Wedding Band, and Men at Work. She has appeared in several films, such as The Benchwarmers (2006), Yes Man (2008), The Pink Panther 2 (2009), and Fired Up! (2009).

Sims was a contributor on the ABC talk show The View during the 2015–2016 season.

=== YSE Beauty ===
Sims is the founder of YSE Beauty, a skincare line created following her personal experience with aging, cystic acne, and melasma.

=== Podcast ===
Sims hosts the Lipstick On the Rim podcast.

== Personal life ==
Sims married film producer Scott Stuber on September 24, 2011, at a Napa Valley vineyard. The couple has three children, two sons born in 2012 and 2017; and a daughter born in 2015.

=== Community involvement ===
Sims appeared on a special edition of Who Wants to Be a Millionaire (1999), and won $125,000 for ovarian cancer research, and hosted a charity event benefiting Ovarian Cancer Research Alliance. Sims is a global ambassador for Population Services International's Five & Alive program, which addresses health crises facing children under the age of five and their families. She is also an ambassador for Operation Smile.

== Filmography ==
Film roles
Year	Title	Role	Notes
2002	Frank McKlusky, C.I.	Injured Girl	
2004	Starsky & Hutch	Mrs. Feldman	
2006	The Benchwarmers	Liz	
2008	Yes Man	Stephanie	
2009	The Pink Panther 2	Marguerite	
2009	Fired Up!	Diora	
2010	Venus & Vegas	Angie	
2013	Chez Upshaw	Claire Bird	
2020	The Wrong Missy	Melissa	
2021	Yes Day	Hiring Executive	
2025	Kinda Pregnant	Yoga instructor	

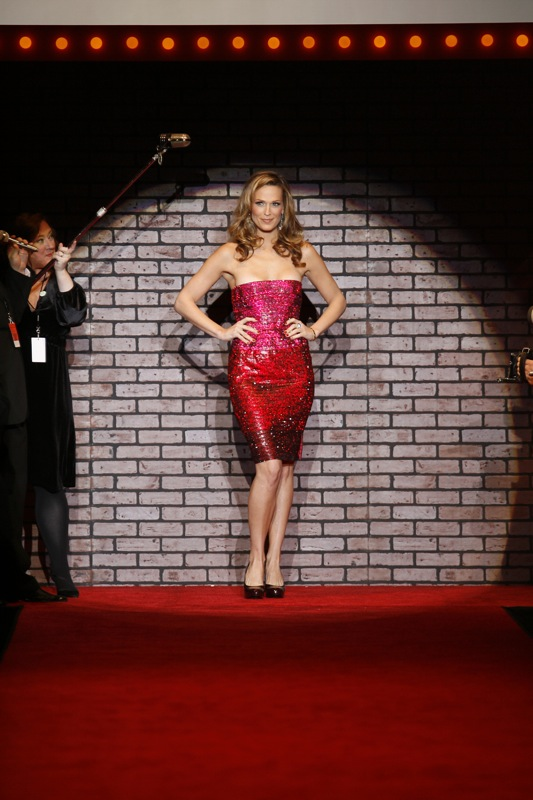
Sims modeling at The Heart Truth Fashion Show 2008

Television roles
Year	Title	Role	Notes
2000–2002	House of Style	Herself / Host	6 episodes
2002	Andy Richter Controls the Universe	Tracy	Episode: "Holy Sheep"
2003	The Twilight Zone	Janet Tyler	Episode: "Eye of the Beholder"
2003–2008	Las Vegas	Delinda Deline	Main role; 106 episodes
2005	Miss USA 2005	Herself / Celebrity Judge	Television special
2007	Punk'd	Herself	
2007	Crossing Jordan	Delinda Deline	Episode: "Crazy Little Thing Called Love"
2008	Saturday Night Live	Nightclub Girl	SNL Digital Short: Jizz in My Pants
2008	The Rachel Zoe Project	Herself	Episodes: "Preview Special" and "Awash in Red Carpet"
2010	Project Runway	Herself / Guest Judge	Episode: "Takin' It to the Streets"
2011	Project Accessory	Herself / Hostess	8 episodes
2012	Royal Pains	Grace Hay Adams	Episode: "This One's for Jack"
2012	Wedding Band	Vanessa	Episode: "Time of My Life"
2013	The Carrie Diaries	Vicki Donovan	Episodes: "Borderline" and "Strings Attached"
2014	Men at Work	Kelly	Episode: "Suburban Gibbs"
2015	Barely Famous	Herself	Episode: "Be More Likeable"
2015–2016	The View	Contributor / Guest Co-Hostess	11 episodes

Music videos
Year	Title	Artist	Role
2002	"We Are All Made of Stars"	Moby	Molly Sims
2008	"Jizz in My Pants"	The Lonely Island	Girl at the Club
