= Rupert Gregson-Williams =

English composer

- Born: Chichester, England
- Genres: Film and television scores, jazz, electronic, synthwave, EDM, big beat, progressive rock
- Occupations: Composer, conductor, music producer
- Instruments: Piano, keyboards, synthesizer, violin, cello
- Years active: 1998–present

Rupert Gregson-Williams is an English composer, conductor, and music producer best known for his film and television scores. His filmography includes Hotel Rwanda, for which he was awarded the European Film composer award, Hacksaw Ridge, Wonder Woman, Aquaman and its sequel, Over the Hedge, Bee Movie, Abominable, Back to the Outback, Made of Honor, The Holiday, The Legend of Tarzan, and numerous films from Adam Sandler's Happy Madison Productions. In addition, he composed music for the video game Battlefield 2: Modern Combat and for television series including Veep, Catch-22, and The Crown.

Educated at choir school, Lancing College, and St John's College, Cambridge, he is the younger brother of film composer Harry Gregson-Williams. He is a member of Hans Zimmer's Remote Control Productions team of composers.

He has received a nomination for two Primetime Emmy Awards and is a recipient of a BMI Award and a European Film Award.

== Filmography ==
=== Feature films ===
==== 1990s ====
| Year | Title | Director | Studio(s) | Notes |
|---|---|---|---|---|
| 1998 | Urban Ghost Story | Geneviève Joliffe | Living Spirit Pictures; Panorama Entertainment | —N/a |
| 1998 | The Prince of Egypt | Brenda Chapman; Steve Hickner; Simon Wells | DreamWorks Animation; DreamWorks Pictures | Conductor (Score composed by Hans Zimmer) |
| 1999 | Virtual Sexuality | Nick Hurran | TriStar Pictures | —N/a |
| 1999 | Shockers: Dance | Richard Clark | Blue Orange Productions | Television film |

==== 2000s ====
| Year | Title | Director | Studio(s) | Notes |
|---|---|---|---|---|
| 2000 | The Road to El Dorado | Eric "Bibo" Bergeron; Don Paul | DreamWorks Animation; DreamWorks Pictures | Conductor (Score composed by Hans Zimmer and John Powell) |
| 2001 | Princess of Thieves | Peter Hewitt | Granada Productions | —N/a |
| 2001 | Hawkins | Robin Shepperd | —N/a | Television film |
| 2001 | My Beautiful Son | Paul Seed | Granada Television; Showtime Networks | Television film |
| 2001 | Lego Jack Stone | Robert Dorney | —N/a | Short film |
| 2002 | Thunderpants | Peter Hewitt | Pathé | —N/a |
| 2002 | Plots with a View | Nick Hurran | Miramax Films | —N/a |
| 2003 | What a Girl Wants | Dennie Gordon | Warner Bros. Pictures | —N/a |
| 2003 | Crime Spree | Brad Mirman | DEJ Productions | —N/a |
| 2003 | The Night We Called It a Day | Paul Goldman | Icon Entertainment | —N/a |
| 2004 | Hotel Rwanda | Terry George | United Artists | Co-composed with Andrea Guerra & Afro Celt Sound System |
| 2004 | King Arthur | Antoine Fuqua | Touchstone Pictures | Additional music (Score composed by Hans Zimmer) |
| 2005 | Love + Hate | Dominic Savage | BBC Films | —N/a |
| 2005 | Wallace & Gromit: The Curse of the Were-Rabbit | Steve Box; Nick Park | Aardman Animations; DreamWorks Animation; DreamWorks Pictures | Additional music (Score composed by Julian Nott) |
| 2006 | Over the Hedge | Tim Johnson; Karey Kirkpatrick | DreamWorks Animation; Paramount Pictures | Also orchestrator and conductor. Music Executive Produced by Hans Zimmer; First score for an animated film |
| 2006 | The Holiday | Nancy Meyers | Waverly Films; Relativity Media; Universal Pictures; Columbia Pictures | Conductor (Score composed by Hans Zimmer) |
| 2006 | Click | Frank Coraci | Original Film; Happy Madison Productions; Revolution Studios; Columbia Pictures | —N/a |
| 2007 | I Now Pronounce You Chuck and Larry | Dennis Dugan | Happy Madison Productions; Relativity Media; Universal Pictures | —N/a |
| 2007 | Bee Movie | Steve Hickner; Simon J. Smith | Columbus 81 Productions; DreamWorks Animation; Paramount Pictures | Also conductor Music Executive Produced by Hans Zimmer |
| 2008 | Made of Honor | Paul Weiland | Original Film; Shady Acres Entertainment; Relativity Media; Columbia Pictures | —N/a |
| 2008 | You Don't Mess with the Zohan | Dennis Dugan | Happy Madison Productions; Relativity Media; Columbia Pictures | —N/a |
| 2008 | Bedtime Stories | Adam Shankman | Offspring Entertainment; Gunn Films; Happy Madison Productions; Walt Disney Pictures | —N/a |
| 2009 | The Maiden Heist | Peter Hewitt | Yari Film Group | —N/a |

==== 2010s ====
| Year | Title | Director | Studio(s) | Notes |
|---|---|---|---|---|
| 2010 | Grown Ups | Dennis Dugan | Happy Madison Productions; Columbia Pictures | —N/a |
| 2011 | Just Go with It | Dennis Dugan | Happy Madison Productions; Columbia Pictures | —N/a |
| 2011 | Zookeeper | Frank Coraci | Happy Madison Productions; Metro-Goldwyn-Mayer; Columbia Pictures | —N/a |
| 2011 | Jack and Jill | Dennis Dugan | Happy Madison Productions; Columbia Pictures | Co-composed with Waddy Wachtel |
| 2012 | That's My Boy | Sean Anders | Happy Madison Productions; Columbia Pictures | —N/a |
| 2012 | Here Comes the Boom | Frank Coraci | Happy Madison Productions; Columbia Pictures | —N/a |
| 2013 | Grown Ups 2 | Dennis Dugan | Happy Madison Productions; Columbia Pictures | —N/a |
| 2014 | Blended | Frank Coraci | Happy Madison Productions; Warner Bros. Pictures | —N/a |
| 2014 | Postman Pat: The Movie | Mike Disa | Icon Productions | —N/a |
| 2014 | Winter's Tale | Akiva Goldsman | Village Roadshow Pictures; Weed Road Pictures; Marc Platt Productions; Warner Bros. Pictures | Co-composed with Hans Zimmer |
| 2015 | Paul Blart: Mall Cop 2 | Andy Fickman | Happy Madison Productions; Columbia Pictures | —N/a |
| 2015 | The Ridiculous Six | Frank Coraci | Happy Madison Productions; Netflix | Co-composed with Elmo Weber |
| 2015 | Open Season: Scared Silly | David Feiss | Sony Pictures Animation; Sony Pictures Home Entertainment | Co-composed with Dominic Lewis |
| 2016 | The Do-Over | Steven Brill | Happy Madison Productions; Netflix | —N/a |
| 2016 | The Legend of Tarzan | David Yates | Warner Bros. Pictures | —N/a |
| 2016 | Hacksaw Ridge | Mel Gibson | Summit Entertainment | Replaced John Debney |
| 2017 | Sandy Wexler | Steven Brill | Happy Madison Productions; Netflix | —N/a |
| 2017 | Wonder Woman | Patty Jenkins | Warner Bros. Pictures; DC Entertainment; Tencent Pictures; Wanda Pictures; RatPac Entertainment; Atlas Entertainment; Cruel and Unusual Films | —N/a |
| 2018 | The Week Of | Robert Smigel | Happy Madison Productions; Netflix | —N/a |
| 2018 | Terminal | Vaughn Stein | RLJE Films | Co-composed with Anthony Clarke |
| 2018 | Aquaman | James Wan | Warner Bros. Pictures; DC Entertainment; The Safran Company | —N/a |
| 2019 | Murder Mystery | Kyle Newacheck | Happy Madison Productions; Netflix | —N/a |
| 2019 | Abominable | Jill Culton | DreamWorks Animation; Pearl Studio; Zhong Ming You Ying Film; Universal Pictures | Also voice of Everest's humming voice and additional orchestrations. |

==== 2020s ====
| Year | Title | Director | Studio(s) | |
|---|---|---|---|---|
| 2020 | Hubie Halloween | Steven Brill | Happy Madison Productions; Netflix | |
| 2021 | Fatherhood | Paul Weitz | Netflix; Columbia Pictures | |
| 2021 | Back to the Outback | Clare Knight; Harry Cripps | Netflix; Netflix Animation; Weed Road Pictures; Reel FX Animation Studios | |
| 2022 | Home Team | Charles Kinnane; Daniel Kinnane | Happy Madison Productions; Netflix | |
| 2023 | Murder Mystery 2 | Jeremy Garelick | Happy Madison Productions; Echo Films; Netflix | |
| 2023 | The Out-Laws | Tyler Spindel | Happy Madison Productions; Netflix | |
| 2023 | Aquaman and the Lost Kingdom | James Wan | Warner Bros. Pictures; DC Entertainment; Atomic Monster; The Safran Company | |
| 2024 | The Union | Julian Farino | Closest to the Hole Productions; Municipal Pictures; Netflix | |
| 2024 | Brothers | Max Barbakow | Amazon MGM Studios; Legendary Pictures | |
| 2024 | Dear Santa | Bobby Farrelly | Paramount+ Paramount Pictures; Conundrum Entertainment | |
| 2025 | Kinda Pregnant | Tyler Spindel | Happy Madison Productions; Netflix | |
| 2025 | Happy Gilmore 2 | Kyle Newacheck | Happy Madison Productions; Netflix | Replaced Mark Mothersbaugh |
| 2026 | Practical Magic 2 | Susanne Bier | Warner Bros. Pictures; Di Novi Pictures; Fortis Films; Blossom Films | Replaced Alan Silvestri |

=== TV ===
| Year | Programme | Notes |
|---|---|---|
| 1988 | Crimestoppers UK | Theme |
| 1995 | Jake's Progress | Music assistant |
| 1999 | Extremely Dangerous | |
| 1999–2003 | At Home with the Braithwaites | |
| 2000 | Take a Girl Like You | |
| 2001 | Jack and the Beanstalk: The Real Story | |
| 2001 | The Wonderful World of Disney | |
| 2004 | William and Mary | |
| 2004 | Long Way Round | |
| 2005–07 | The Last Detective | Co-composed with Alastair King |
| 2006 | Born Equal | |
| 2009 | The Prisoner | |
| 2012 | Veep | Co-composed with Christopher Willis |
| 2014 | Agatha Raisin: The Quiche of Death | Co-composed with Christopher Willis |
| 2015 | Virtuso | |
| 2016–17 | The Crown | Main title composed by Hans Zimmer; Composed with Lorne Balfe |
| 2017 | The Alienist | Composed the first season |
| 2019 | Catch-22 | Co-composed with Harry Gregson-Williams |
| 2019 | Catherine the Great | |
| 2021 | Behind Her Eyes | |
| 2022 | The Gilded Age | Co-composed with Harry Gregson-Williams |
| 2024 | The Perfect Couple | |

=== Video games ===
| Year | Title | Studio | Notes |
|---|---|---|---|
| 2005 | Battlefield 2: Modern Combat | Digital Illusions CE | Co-composed with Tobias Marberger |

== Awards ==
| Year | Work | Organization | Category | Result | Ref |
|---|---|---|---|---|---|
| 2002 | Jack and the Beanstalk: The Real Story: Part 2 | Emmy Award | Outstanding Music Composition for a Miniseries, Movie or a Special (Dramatic Underscore) | Nominated | |
| 2007 | Bee Movie | International Animated Film Association | Best Music in a Feature Production | Nominated | |
| 2017 | The Crown: Hyde Park Corner | Emmy Award | Outstanding Music Composition for a Series (Original Dramatic Score) | Nominated | |
