= Project Accessory =

- Starring: Molly Sims; Kenneth Cole; Ariel Foxman; Eva Jeanbart
- Country of origin: United States
- Original language: English
- No. of seasons: 1
- No. of episodes: 8

Production
- Running time: 40-42 minutes
- Production companies: The Weinstein Company Television; Addington Productions; Goodbye Pictures

Original release
- Network: Lifetime
- Release: October 28 – December 22, 2011

Project Accessory is an American reality television series, a spin-off of the series Project Runway. It began airing on Lifetime on October 28, 2011. On the show, 12 contestants were given challenges in which they must create various fashion accessories (ranging from jewelry and headpieces to handbags and shoes) with restrictions for materials, subject matter, and time. One or more contestants were eliminated each episode after appearing before a judging panel. Brian Burkhardt won the show and the $100,000 prize.

== Judges and mentor ==
- Molly Sims - Host and judge
- Kenneth Cole - American fashion designer, activist
- Ariel Foxman - Editor, InStyle Magazine
- Eva Jeanbart-Lorenzotti - Mentor

== Contestants ==
Designer	Age	Place of Residence	Finish
Cotrice Simpson	38	Georgia	12th
Kelly Horton	32	Pennsylvania	11th
David Grieco	40	California	10th
Nicolina Royale	30	California	9th
James Sommerfeldt	29	Illinois	8th
Shea Curry	38	California	7th
Adrian Dana	41	Georgia	6th
Christina Caruso	33	New York	5th
Diego Rocha	36	Illinois	4th
Rich Sandomeno	40	California	3rd
Nina Cortes	26	Florida	Runner-up
Brian Burkhardt	40	Florida	Winner

=== Progress ===
Designer Elimination Table
Contestant	1	2	3	4	5	6	7	8
Brian	HIGH	HIGH	IN	HIGH	WIN	WIN	LOW	WINNER
Nina	WIN	IN	IN	IN	HIGH	HIGH	HIGH	RUNNER-UP
Rich	IN	IN	HIGH	LOW	LOW	LOW	WIN	3RD PLACE
Diego	HIGH	IN	HIGH	WIN	HIGH	LOW	OUT	
Christina	IN	IN	WIN	HIGH	IN	HIGH	OUT	
Adrian	IN	LOW	LOW	IN	LOW	OUT		
Shea	IN	IN	LOW	LOW	OUT			
James	LOW	WIN	IN	OUT				
Nicolina	LOW	HIGH	OUT					
David	IN	LOW	OUT					
Kelly	IN	OUT						
Cotrice	OUT							

The designer won Project Accessory.
The designer won the challenge.
The designer was in the top two, or the first announced into the top 3, but did not win.
The designer had one of the highest scores for that challenge, but did not place in the top two.
The designer had one of the lowest scores for that challenge, but was not in the bottom two.
The designer was in the bottom two, but was not eliminated.
The designer was eliminated from the competition.

=== Elimination process ===
The judges announce the safe designers. The remaining designers are labeled as either the highest or lowest scoring designers. These designers are given critiques and are then told to leave the runway. Once they are brought back, the other designers that aren't in the top two are announced safe. Then the winner is announced, and the remaining top designer is in the top 2. The remaining designers are the lowest scoring designers. The people who aren't in the bottom two are announced safe. The bottom two remain, and one is then eliminated.

== Episodes ==
=== Episode 1: Accessorize This?! ===
The 12 designers were welcomed by host and mentor at a storage facility in which they had to make a necklace, a belt and another accessory of their choice using materials found in the storage facilities. Original Airdate: October 27, 2011

- Guest Judge: Debra Messing

WINNER: Nina Cortes
ELIMINATED: Cotrice Simpson

=== Episode 2: Sole Searching ===
The remaining 11 designers were sent to the Swarovski Crystal store where they picked a piece to inspire them. They had to make a pair of shoes as well as two accessories. Original Airdate: November 3, 2011

- Guest Judge: Nadja Swarovski

WINNER: James Sommerfeldt
ELIMINATED: Kelly Horton

=== Episode 3: Bling It On ===
The designers are given 24 hours to complete their next challenge, but Eva drops a surprise on them. Original Airdate: November 10, 2011

- Guest Judge: Kelly Osbourne

WINNER: Christina Caruso
ELIMINATED: David Grieco, Nicolina Royale

=== Episode 4: Its in the Bag ===
The designers are matched with an eBay customer featured on the site for their unique fashion sense. Original Airdate: November 17, 2011

- Guest Judge: Kara Ross, Rebecca Minkoff

WINNER: Diego Rocha
ELIMINATED: James Sommerfeldt

=== Episode 5: Beach Blanket Blingo ===
The designers go to the beach for a challenge. Original Airdate: December 1, 2011

- Guest Judge: Rachel Roy, Jenna Lyons

WINNER: Brian Burkhardt
ELIMINATED: Shea Curry

=== Episode 6: Fall for Kenneth ===
The designers go on a field trip to a fashion magnate's headquarters and discover a coveted prize. Original Airdate: December 8, 2011

- Guest Judge: Alexa Chung

WINNER: Brian Burkhardt
ELIMINATED: Adrian Dana

=== Episode 7: Bugging Out ===
The designers search for inspiration at a curiosity shop to create a signature accessory. Original Airdate: December 15, 2011

- Guest Judge: Brian Atwood

WINNER: Rich Sandomeno
ELIMINATED: Christina Curoso, Diego Rocha

=== Episode 8: Finale ===
The season concludes with the final three designers presenting their creations to New York's fashion elite. In a plot twist, each of the three finalists is allowed to choose a partner to help finish their collections. Brian Burkhardt enlists shoemaker James Sommerfeldt, Rich Sandomeno chooses handbag designer Diego Rocha, and Nina Cortes picks handbag designer Kelly Horton. Later, the winner is selected by the judges. Original Airdate: December 22, 2011

- Guest Judge: Lorraine Schwartz

WINNER: Brian Burkhardt, with shoes and accessories made by James Sommerfeldt
ELIMINATED: Nina Cortes, Rich Sandomeno

== Reception ==
In a mixed review, Common Sense Media's Elka Karl wrote, "While this competitive reality show is a bit rough around the edges, Project Accessory is worth a look, especially for teens who are interested in jewelry making, sewing, or other creative, crafty endeavors. Fans of Project Runway will likely tune in, and while the show benefits from the relationship with the original program, it also suffers from the inevitable comparisons. Neither Molly Sims or mentor Eva Jeanbart-Lorenzotti are anywhere near as charismatic or helpful as Heidi Klum or Tim Gunn. Luckily, the designers are engaging and represent an eclectic mix of styles." In a negative review, Brandon Nowalk of The A.V. Club stated, "As television, this is some pretty uninspiring stuff, the point of which, apparently, is to see how far a successful model can take an entirely different show."
