= Hoboken Music Awards =

Annual awards show for artists from the Hoboken area

- Awarded for: Outstanding achievements or contributions to the regional music industry.
- Country: United States
- First award: 2009
- Website: hobokenmusicawards.com

The Hoboken Music Awards were an annual award show. Bands and artists from the Hoboken area of New Jersey are eligible for receipt of the awards.

== About ==
The Hoboken Music Awards were founded in 2009 by Dave Entwistle, a long-time host of the weekly showcase Peoples Open Mic. Modeled after the Asbury Park Music Awards, the Hoboken Music Awards honors regional musicians and promoters, hosts live performances and brings the people of the North Jersey music scene together. Music journalist Stephen Bailey joined as an event organizer in 2010.

=== 2009 awards ===
The first annual Hoboken Awards were held at the now defunct Goldhawk. Prizes included golden microphones and free studio time. Ten awards were presented to bands and musicians. Hundreds of fans and friends filled the back room at Goldhawk. Remarking on the attendance, Entwistle said "I thought there was going to be more nominees than people actually here to listen to live music, but I was wrong." Goldhawk closed in the Fall of 2009.

- Best Hard Rock Band – High Speed Chase

=== 2010 awards ===
The second annual Hoboken Music Awards was held at Northern Soul starting at 7 P.M., on November 20, 2010. The judges included record label executives, a radio disc jockey, and industry insiders, with sponsorship from Heineken, HMag, local recording studios, and Guitar Bar, with performances by Rainbow Fresh, Hey Tiger, Davey & the Trainwreck, Shae Fiol, Karyn Kuhl, Hudson Crossing, the Fave and Sylvana Joyce & the Moment. On Hoboken's popularity during the 1980s, folk singer Karyn Kuhl notes that "it may not be the 'Liverpool of the 80s' anymore, but there is a warm, supportive vibe [and] I'm really happy to be a part of it", adding "we've been lucky to have Maxwell's in town and now we have people like Dave Entwistle, Lea Simone, and Jen Lampert, who are always thinking up new ways to get people together to play."

- Outstanding EP – The Fave
- Outstanding Album – Julian Peterson for Get on This Train
- Outstanding Scene Contributor – Lea Noelle Simone for the Pier Sessions
- Outstanding Female Solo – Shae Fiol
- Outstanding Male Solo - Marc Giannoti
- Outstanding People's Choice – Bern & the Brights
- Outstanding Band – Bern & the Brights

=== 2011 awards ===
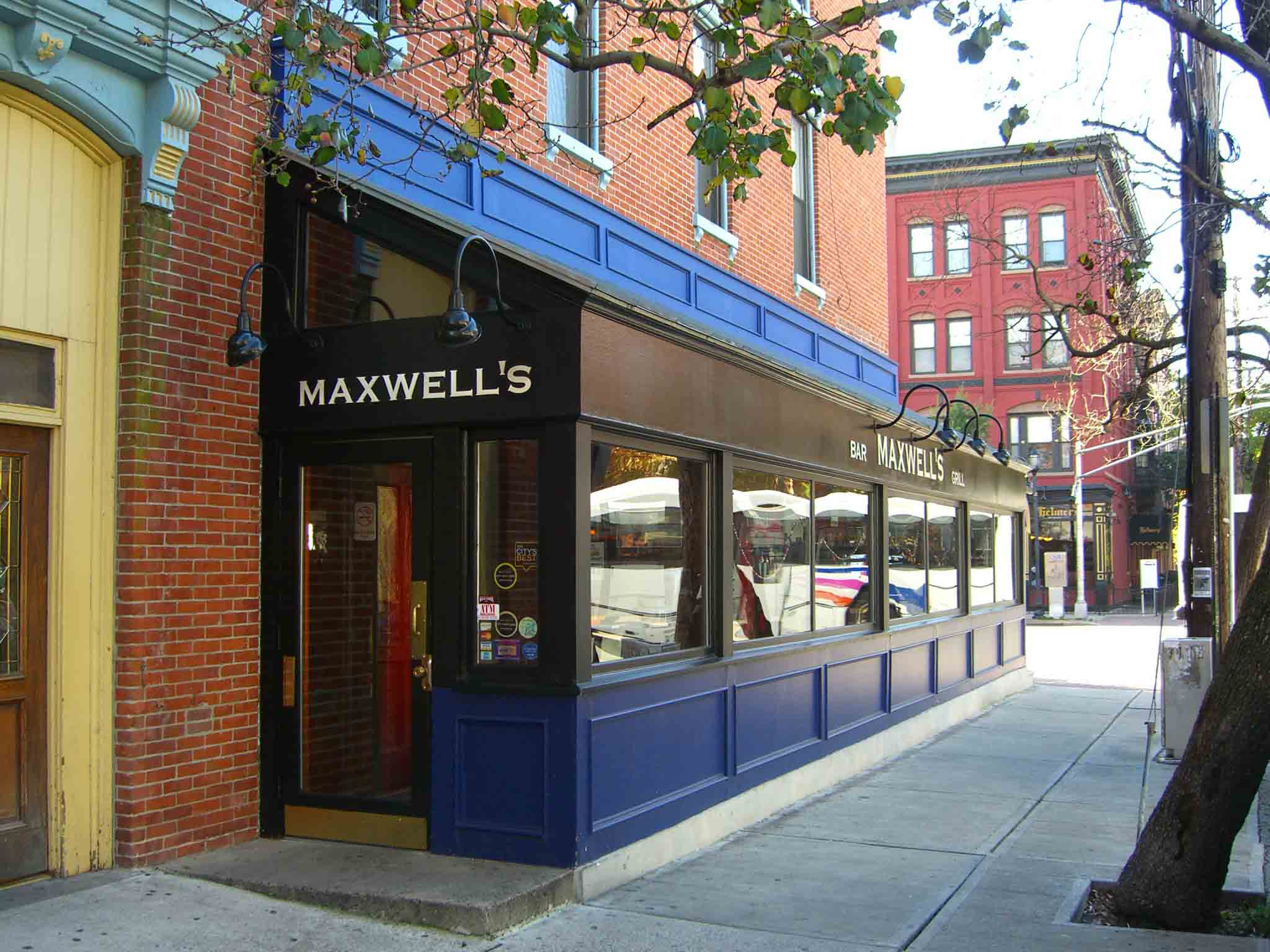
Maxwell's in November 2011.

The third annual Hoboken Music Awards was held at Maxwell's, on November 12, 2011. The judges included disc jockeys Lindsay Klein of WDHA and Brian Phillips of WRXP, Dan McLoughlin, owner of Garden Street Music, Tris McCall and Steve Shelley. On the event, Outstanding Band nominee Adam Bird of Those Mockingbirds notes "bands are either struggling or they're superstars. We need to get back to supporting that middle class of bands." Outstanding Video was added as an award in 2011.

- Outstanding EP – Waking Lights
- Outstanding Album – The Milwaukees
- Outstanding Scene Contributor – Lea Noelle Simone for the Pier Sessions
- Outstanding Video – The Nico Blues
- Outstanding Female Solo – Karyn Kuhl
- Outstanding Male Solo – Khaled Dajani
- Outstanding People's Choice – Stephie Coplan & the Pedestrians
- Outstanding Band – Stuyvesant

=== 2012 awards ===
The fourth annual Hoboken Music Awards was held at Northern Soul on November 18, 2012. As a consequence of Superstorm Sandy, organizers transformed the awards night into a benefit for local musicians, and raised over $1600 with a concert at Maxwell's on November 17.

- Outstanding EP – Bern & the Brights for Work
- Outstanding Album – Matt Madly for Mistaken
- Outstanding Scene Contributor – Geri Fallo
- Outstanding Female Solo – Christina Alessi
- Outstanding Male Solo – Liam Brown
- Outstanding Band – Hello Radio

=== 2013 awards ===
The fifth annual Hoboken Music Awards was held at Willie McBride's, on November 23, 2013. The judges included Lindsay Klein from WDHA, Dan McLoughlin from Garden Street Music, Chris "Gibby" Gibson from Upstart Studios, Al Crisafulli from Dromedary Records, Kevin Cale from hMag and Dwight Thompson from D's Soul Full Cafe, with performances by Parlance, Big Wake, Rob Nicholas Band, Khaled & the Naguals, the Defending Champions, the Fave and Karyn Kuhl.

- Living Legend Award – Jim Testa for Jersey Beat and Jersey Journal
- Outstanding EP – Waking Lights for Weeknights
- Outstanding Album – Karyn Kuhl for Songs for the Dead
- Outstanding Contribution To The Music Scene – Jim Mastro
- Outstanding Video – Khaled Dajani for "A Mad World"
- Outstanding Scene Contributor – Jim Mastro
- Outstanding Female Solo – Allison Strong
- Outstanding Male Solo – Rob Nicholas
- Outstanding People's Choice – Allison Strong
- Outstanding Band – Sylvana Joyce & the Moment

=== 2014 ===
Beginning in the Winter of 2014, Entwistle and Bailey became concert curators for Maxwell's upon its reopening under new ownership. They host a monthly Hoboken Music Awards Indie Night, which showcases local bands in the back room, and creates eligibility for the next year's award ceremony. The first concert night was on December 5, 2014.
