= The Wrong Missy =

2020 film by Tyler Spindel

- Promotional poster
- Directed by: Tyler Spindel
- Written by: Chris Pappas; Kevin Barnett
- Produced by: Kevin Grady; Allen Covert; Judit Maull
- Starring: David Spade; Lauren Lapkus; Nick Swardson; Geoff Pierson; Jackie Sandler; Sarah Chalke; Rob Schneider; Chris Witaske; Roman Reigns; Molly Sims
- Cinematography: Theo van de Sande
- Edited by: Brian Robinson; J.J. Titone
- Music by: Mateo Messina
- Production company: Happy Madison Productions
- Distributed by: Netflix
- Release date: May 13, 2020
- Running time: 90 minutes
- Country: United States
- Language: English

The Wrong Missy is a 2020 American romantic comedy film directed by Tyler Spindel which was produced by Happy Madison Productions. With a screenplay by Chris Pappas and Kevin Barnett, the film stars David Spade as a recently single businessman who accidentally invites a woman (Lauren Lapkus) with whom he had a horrible first date to a corporate retreat after a case of mistaken identity.

The film was released on Netflix on May 13, 2020, and received mostly negative reviews from critics.

== Plot ==
In Portland, Tim has a blind date with Melissa, nicknamed Missy, who turns out to be extremely strange, and her oddball behavior turns out to be both dangerous and disastrous. Her wild antics force Tim to sneak out of the restaurant through a bathroom window, thereby dislocating his ankle.

Three months later, Tim bumps into a beautiful and successful woman (also named Melissa) at the airport. They connect over drinks, finding out they have nearly everything in common and seem to be perfect for each other. She gives him her number.

After a series of intimate texts, he eventually invites Melissa to his work retreat in Hawaii. However, Missy shows up on the plane, and Tim realizes he had been texting the wrong Melissa the whole time. The antics start again as Missy forcibly gives him a tranquilizer and, when he awakens, she is giving him a handjob.

On the corporate retreat in Hawaii, the new CEO, Jack Winstone, greets everyone at the welcome party. When Missy makes an appearance, she is awkward and wild, and seems to always leave Tim in embarrassing situations in front of his boss and colleagues. Back at their room, he awakens from another tranquilized state to her on top of him, riding him cowgirl style. She often becomes reckless and intoxicated and her behavior humiliates Tim.

However, before too long, Missy starts to help Tim succeed at his work retreat, and even hypnotizes his boss to win his favor. As they spend more time together, Tim eventually begins to fall for her. His workplace competitor, Jess "the Barracuda", is not pleased when Winstone gives a job to Tim instead of her, so she reveals to Missy that her invitation was a mistake, and Tim had wanted to bring someone else. When Missy checks Tim's phone, she finds out the truth. Saddened and devastated, she leaves Hawaii.

However, at the moment Missy leaves in a cab, the actual Melissa arrives in Hawaii (having been invited by Jess). At lunch, Tim begins acting outlandishly, much like Missy did on their first date, imbibing a bevy of alcoholic shots and then performing a walking handstand in the dining room. After falling from the balcony and crippling himself, Tim lets the new Melissa know that he has developed feelings for Missy, and then departs Hawaii. Back in the office, Tim decides to remove the hypnotic spell Missy put on his boss by uttering the obscene and obscure magic words. His honesty results in him losing his job.

Tim tricks Missy into a date, where he plays the same trick that she had used on him. Except she meets Vanilla Ice at the bar. Tim comes up and apologizes to her and tells her he used to want someone exactly like him, but now realizes he does not. He tells her all the things that he likes about her, and says that he wants to be more like her. She forgives him, and they kiss.

== Cast ==
- David Spade as Tim Morris
- Lauren Lapkus as Missy, the titular "wrong Missy" and love interest to Tim
- Nick Swardson as Nate
- Geoff Pierson as Jack Winstone
- Jackie Sandler as Jess, also known as 'The Barracuda'
- Sarah Chalke as Julia
- Rob Schneider as Komante
- Chris Witaske as Rich
- Roman Reigns as Tatted Meathead (Gary)
- Molly Sims as Melissa, the "right Missy"
- John Farley as Calvin Sr.
- Jorge Garcia as Guy on Plane
- Bobby Lee as Check-In Desk Employee
- Arlene Newman as Barbara Winstone
- Jonathan Loughran as Paul
- Jared Sandler as Stuart
- Sadie Sandler as Lobby Strong Sadie
- Sunny Sandler as Lobby Strong Sunny
- Emma Rose Goldstein as Lobby Strong Emma
- Lori Pelenise Tuisano as Bus Woman
- Vanilla Ice as himself (credited as Rob Van Winkle)

== Production ==
The film was announced in January 2019, with David Spade set to star and Tyler Spindel directing. The additional castings of Lauren Lapkus, Geoff Pierson, Sarah Chalke, Molly Sims, Nick Swardson, Jackie Sandler, Chris Witaske and Roman Reigns were announced by March 2019, with filming commencing that same month.

== Release ==
The film was released on Netflix on May 13, 2020. In July 2020, Netflix revealed the film had been watched by 59 million households over its first four weeks of release, among the most-ever for one of their original films.

== Reception ==
On Rotten Tomatoes, the film has an approval rating of 32% based on 59 reviews, with an average rating of 4.2/10. The website's critical consensus reads: "Lauren Lapkus lifts The Wrong Missy above abject failure, but this lazy comedy will be the wrong option for all but the most Happy Madison-starved viewers." On Metacritic, the film has a weighted average score of 33 out of 100 based on 12 critics, indicating "generally unfavorable reviews".

Owen Gleiberman of Variety praised Lauren Lapkus, saying she is "like a grenade of happy insanity tossed into the middle of every scene," and while finding the film generic, he stated, "it does make you want to see Lauren Lapkus's next act."

=== Accolades ===
Award	Date of ceremony	Category	Recipients	Result	Ref.
Golden Raspberry Awards	April 24, 2021	Worst Actor	David Spade	Nominated	
Golden Raspberry Awards	April 24, 2021	Worst Actress	Lauren Lapkus	Nominated	
Golden Raspberry Awards	April 24, 2021	Worst Screen Combo	Lauren Lapkus and David Spade	Nominated	
