= The Out-Laws (film) =

2023 film by Tyler Spindel

- Release poster
- Directed by: Tyler Spindel
- Written by: Evan Turner; Ben Zazove
- Produced by: Allen Covert; Adam DeVine; Adam Sandler
- Starring: Adam DeVine; Nina Dobrev; Ellen Barkin; Pierce Brosnan; Poorna Jagannathan
- Cinematography: Michael Bonvillain
- Edited by: Ian Kezsbom; Phillip Kimsey
- Music by: Rupert Gregson-Williams
- Production company: Happy Madison Productions
- Distributed by: Netflix
- Release date: July 7, 2023
- Running time: 95 minutes
- Country: United States
- Language: English

The Out-Laws is a 2023 American action comedy film directed by Tyler Spindel, written by Evan Turner and Ben Zazove, produced by Adam Sandler, Adam DeVine, and Allen Covert, and stars DeVine, Nina Dobrev, Ellen Barkin, and Pierce Brosnan with Poorna Jagannathan.

The plot follows a bank manager on his wedding week whose bank is robbed by criminals that he very strongly suspects might be his future in-laws which gets proven right as he works with them when a crime boss that the criminals made enemies abducts his fiancé.

The Out-Laws was released by Netflix on July 7, 2023.

== Plot ==
Owen Browning, a young bank manager, and Parker McDermott, a yoga instructor, are about to get married. When Parker's long-absent parents contact her to come to the wedding, Owen is excited that he will get to meet them, but she is concerned they can be overbearing.

Owen calls Neil and Margie, his difficult and anxious parents, to relay the good news about Parker's parents attending the wedding. They show their ignorance of Parker's profession as a yoga instructor, believing it involves a stripper pole, and rather than being happy about the news, they criticize Parker's parents for their absence from her life.

At the bank, Owen has to free an employee locked in the vault as the result of a recurring prank. In doing so, he shows and talks about how state-of-the-art their bank's security system is. They point out their rival bank's vault security is considered the best in the state. Owen also mentions that all vaults have an emergency escape latch.

Out at dinner with his parents, they talk about the impending arrival of Parker's parents. Meanwhile, Owen talks with the storage space facility where they rent, as he is hoping to access photos of Parker and them for a wedding photo montage. His call inadvertently alerts crime boss Rehan to their return.

The following night, Parker's parents scare Owen when they let themselves into the soon-to-be-married couple's home, while Parker is still out leading a yoga class. They insist Owen call them Billy and Lilly. The next day, Owen takes a day off work to spend with the in-laws. They pick the agenda, so they go skydiving, get tattoos, and drink.

Within 12 hours, an infamous full-costumed pair of criminals called the "Ghost Bandits" hold up Owen's bank, with Owen, now hungover, in the building. He notices specific indicators such as the male's cologne, giving him flashbacks to the bar the night before. Owen also recalls security details he revealed to Lilly, prompting him to believe that the robbers might be his future in-laws.

FBI special agent Roger Oldham questions Owen as the bank manager, with Billy and Lilly behind him. Not able to say anything, Parker insists they leave once Owen breaks out in tears. Oldham has dedicated most of his career chasing the Ghost Bandits and is convinced they are behind the robbery.

Trying to enlist his parents' help in outing Billy and Lilly, Owen tells them his suspicions. They do ask direct and inappropriate questions at dinner, but Billy and Lilly expertly redirect the conversation. Parker later asks Owen why he is acting strangely, and when he tells her his theory, she believes it is crazy.

Owen follows his in-laws to Rehan's and hears Rehan threaten to kill Parker if they do not get her $5,000,000 more before the wedding. Oldham stops Owen on the highway, finding planted evidence in the trunk, so Owen spills on his in-laws. Oldham puts a wire on him, hoping to get Billy and Lilly to confess. Instead, Rehan shows up with her henchmen and takes Parker hostage as insurance. Disgusted, Owen joins forces with Billy and Lilly.

They first choose Victory Union Bank to rob, but after losing most of the cash, they focus on the much bigger Atlas Reserve. Owen asks its manager, Phoebe, how he can better equip his bank, and she arrogantly shows him all of the safeguards. Just as the vault opens, Billy and Lilly create a diversion out front, while Owen locks himself in the vault and then uses the emergency escape latch to escape with the money.

At the ransom drop, Rehan is pleasantly surprised that Owen brought the money, but will kill them anyway. Owen miraculously guns them down. Then, Billy and Lilly distract the cops, so Owen can sneak back into the vault with the money.

Finally as Billy and Lilly turn themselves in, agent Oldham lets them go briefly to Owen and Parker's wedding reception. During the credits, Owen slips a paperclip into a piece of cake for Billy and Lilly to use to get free of their handcuffs.

== Cast ==
- Adam DeVine as Owen Browning, the manager of a bank
- Pierce Brosnan as Billy McDermott, a member of the Ghost Bandits and Lilly's husband
- Ellen Barkin as Lilly McDermott, a member of the Ghost Bandits and Billy's wife
- Nina Dobrev as Parker McDermott, a yoga instructor who is Owen's fiancée and the daughter of Billy and Lilly
- Poorna Jagannathan as Rehan Zakaryan, the main antagonist, an Eastern European crime boss who the Ghost Bandits made enemies of
- Michael Rooker as Roger Oldham, an FBI agent investigating the Ghost Bandits
- Richard Kind as Neil Browning, the father of Owen
- Julie Hagerty as Margie Browning, the mother of Owen and wife of Neil
- Blake Anderson as RJ, the cousin of Owen
- Lauren Lapkus as Phoebe King, the manager of Atlas Reserves
- Lil Rel Howery as Tyree, a security guard at Owen's bank
- Dean Winters as Vince Millen, the manager of Victory Union Bank
- Laci Mosley as Marisol
- Daniel Andrew Jablons as Gary
- Sunny Sandler as Gracie
- Peggy Walton-Walker as Ruth, the grandmother of Owen
- Mo Gallini as Boris
- Jackie Sandler as Kay
- Betsy Sodaro as Ida, a chef

== Production ==
In July 2021, Pierce Brosnan was cast in the film alongside Adam DeVine. In October 2021, Ellen Barkin, Nina Dobrev, Michael Rooker, Poorna Jagannathan, Julie Hagerty, Richard Kind, Lil Rel Howery, and Blake Anderson filled out the rest of the cast. Principal photography took place in Atlanta, Georgia, from October to December 2021.

== Release ==
The Out-Laws was released by Netflix on July 7, 2023.

== Reception ==
On the review aggregator website Rotten Tomatoes, 19% of 72 critics' reviews are positive, with an average rating of 3.8/10. The website's consensus reads: "With a cast this talented, The Out-Laws can't help but provide some laughs -- but they're too few and far between to make up for the movie's derivative, sitcom-worthy setup." Metacritic, which uses a weighted average, assigned the film a score of 36 out of 100, based on 17 critics, indicating "generally unfavorable" reviews.
