= Tyler Spindel =

American comedian, actor and director

- Born: 1990 (age 35–36)
- Education: Harvard University
- Occupations: Actor; comedian; director

Tyler Spindel is an American comedian, actor and director.

== Life and career ==
Spindel was born in 1990 to dentist Elizabeth (née Sandler) and Gerald Spindel. He starred in Father of the Year, The Wrong Missy, The Out-Laws and Kinda Pregnant.

== Filmography ==
=== Director ===
Year	Title
2018	Father of the Year
2020	The Wrong Missy
2023	The Out-Laws
2025	Kinda Pregnant
