= All Sensory Void =

American indie rock band

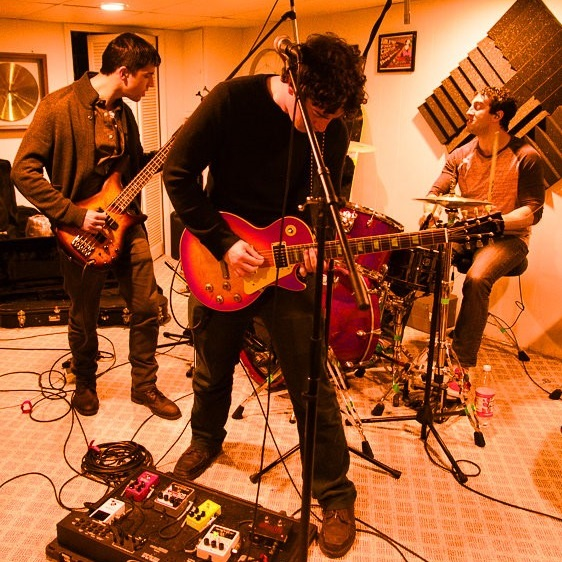
- All Sensory Void playing a basement show in 2016

Background information
- Origin: New Jersey, U.S.
- Genres: Indie rock, psychedelic rock, garage rock
- Years active: 2013–present
- Label: Sniffling Indie Kids
- Members: Brian DePhillis; Danny Goldberg; Eric Goldberg

All Sensory Void is an American indie rock project from New Jersey.

== History ==
All Sensory Void is mostly the solo project of multi-instrumentalist and singer-songwriter Eric Goldberg. He describes All Sensory Void as a "romantically hopeless band that makes hopelessly romantic indie rock music," and it draws comparison to the music of Mac DeMarco, Foxygen, Quilt, and My Bloody Valentine. The debut six-track album, entitled Relax Man...You're Actually Just Energy Condensed to a Slow Vibration, was released on February 1, 2013. Lamplighter ranked the album No. 3 in its Top 5 Albums from 2013, saying "for an album that is absorbing in its charisma[,] All Sensory Void's brand of reverb-soaked garage rock just makes dirty sound so clean." A review in The Aquarian Weekly notes the album's "overlapping vocal[s,] powerhouse guitar riffs[,] skillfully crafted lyrics and signature vocal style." They describe the song "Missing the Carriage" as "sweet and sultry, [and] is easily the cut that brightens up the whole release," and the song "Essentially Existential" as providing "the spice that really ties the whole collection together."

Their second full-length album, the ten-track Psychedelic Syd and the Recklessly Abandoned, was released on September 1, 2013. It was listed in Jersey Beat's Best of 2013, and was nominated for a Hoboken Music Award for Outstanding Album. The music video for the song "I am the Contradiction," as described by Goldberg, is an "imagining [of] a psychedelic (possibly horrifying) world with multiple versions of myself," and features otherworldly manipulations of colors and his image. The ten-track album, entitled Everywhere You Go... There You Are, was released on June 10, 2014.

=== Sniffling Indie Kids ===
After the formation of the label Sniffling Indie Kids, All Sensory contributed the song "Chelsea Rising" for the compilation album, Space Jamz: 5 Bands 1 Practice Space. Goldberg released the eight-track album, entitled Secret Truth of the Universe, on February 3, 2015. The seven-track album Chasing Transcendence was released with Sniffling Indie Kids, on February 4, 2016. It features bassist Danny Goldberg, who played with Goldberg in the alternative rock band the Nico Blues, and drummer Brian DePhillis. It was produced by Skylar Adler, the former the Nico Blues drummer. Courier News says that Chasing Transcendence "waxes philosophic" and boasts a "ringing charm and sense of explosiveness that isn't afraid to jam but jams without sacrificing solid songwriting."

== Discography ==
Albums

- Relax Man...You're Actually Just Energy Condensed to a Slow Vibration (2013)
- Psychedelic Syd and the Recklessly Abandoned (2013)
- Everywhere You Go... There You Are (2014)
- Secret Truth of the Universe (2015)
- Chasing Transcendence (2016)

Appearing on

- Space Jamz: 5 Bands 1 Practice Space (2014)
