= Gadfly Online =

American periodical

Gadfly Magazine was a periodical that was created in February 1997 and launched as a full-size print publication in January 1998. The publisher is the Rutherford Institute. The magazine is based in Charlottesville, Virginia. At the Utne Reader's Eleventh Annual Alternative Press Awards, in 1999, it won for best Cultural Coverage.

After the publication of the last print issue, in March/April 2001, "the creative forces behind the magazine" launched Gadfly Online, which was published for a little over a year. It remains an online presence, as an archive and guide to back issues.

The subject matter centers on popular culture, including music, stand-up comedy, and film; the first issue of the magazine's print version gave a preview of The Matrix.

Gadfly Online published such writers as Andrew Loog Oldham, Tom Bradley, Richard Abowitz, Nile Southern (son of Terry Southern), Stephen Lee Naish, Marty Wombacher and the rock critic David Dalton. The magazine was relaunched as online publication in 2011.
