= List of Jennifer Aniston performances =

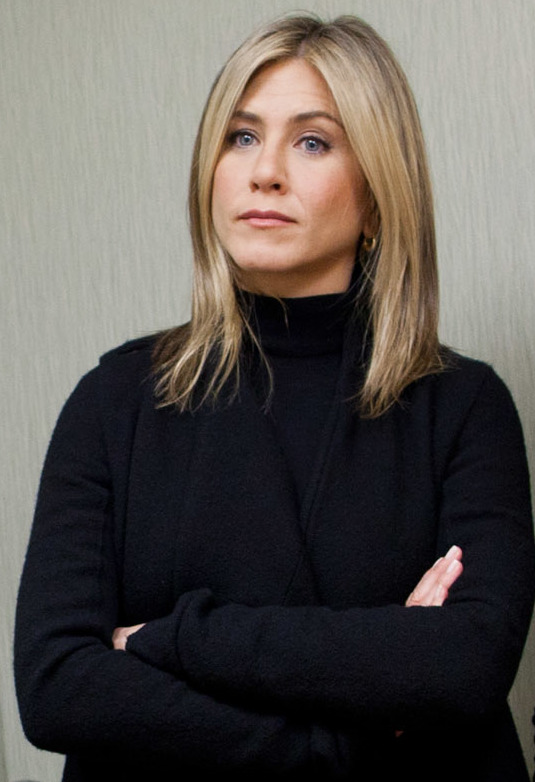
Aniston in 2011

American actress Jennifer Aniston made her film debut in the 1988 comic science fiction film Mac and Me in an uncredited role of a dancer. Two years later, she made her television debut in the series Molloy (1990) followed that year by a starring role in Ferris Bueller, a television adaptation of the 1986 film Ferris Bueller's Day Off; both series were cancelled in their first seasons. In 1993, she had her first major film role in the horror comedy Leprechaun. She was offered a spot as a featured player on Saturday Night Live but turned this down to accept a starring role on the NBC television sitcom Friends (1994–2004).

Aniston gained worldwide recognition for portraying Rachel Green on Friends, a role which earned her five Primetime Emmy Award nominations (two for Supporting Actress, three for Lead Actress), winning one for Lead Actress and also a Golden Globe. During its ninth and tenth seasons, Aniston became one of the highest-paid television actors of all time, earning $1 million for each episode. In 2003, Aniston appeared in the comedy Bruce Almighty, opposite Jim Carrey. The film grossed $484 million worldwide, making it Aniston's biggest commercial success in film. In 2004, she starred in the romantic comedy Along Came Polly alongside Ben Stiller, and in 2006, she appeared in the romantic comedy The Break-Up, opposite Vince Vaughn.

Aniston had further commercially successful films including Marley & Me (2008), He's Just Not That Into You (2009), and The Bounty Hunter (2010). In 2010, she appeared as a guest star on the sitcom Cougar Town alongside former Friends co-star Courteney Cox. In 2014, Aniston starred in Daniel Barnz's drama Cake, with her role earning critical acclaim. She received nominations for a Golden Globe and a Screen Actors Guild Award. In 2019, she began starring in the Apple TV+ drama series The Morning Show, for which she is also an executive producer. For her performance in it, she was nominated for a Golden Globe.

Aside from acting, Aniston has directed three films including Room 10, Burma: It Can't Wait, and Five. She has also appeared in several music videos, video games, and theatrical plays. Along with Brad Pitt and Brad Grey, former CEO of Paramount Pictures, Aniston founded the film production company Plan B Entertainment in 2002; she and Grey withdrew in 2005. In 2008, Aniston and Kristin Hahn co-founded the production company Echo Films.

== Film ==
Key
†	Denotes films that have not yet been released

Year	Title	Role	Notes	Ref.
1988	Mac and Me	Dancer at a McDonald's party	Uncredited role	
1993	Leprechaun	Tory Reding		
1996	She's the One	Renee Fitzpatrick		
1996	Dream for an Insomniac	Allison		
1997	'Til There Was You	Debbie		
1997	Picture Perfect	Kate Mosley		
1998	The Thin Pink Line	Clove		
1998	Waiting for Woody	Herself	Short film	
1998	The Object of My Affection	Nina Borowski		
1999	Office Space	Joanna		
1999	The Iron Giant	Annie Hughes (voice)		
2001	Rock Star	Emily Poule		
2002	The Good Girl	Justine Last		
2003	Bruce Almighty	Grace Connelly		
2003	Abby Singer	Herself		
2004	Along Came Polly	Polly Prince		
2005	Derailed	Lucinda Harris / Jane		
2005	Rumor Has It	Sarah Huttinger		
2006	Friends with Money	Olivia		
2006	Room 10	–	Short film; director	
2006	The Break-Up	Brooke Meyers		
2008	Marley & Me	Jenny Grogan		
2008	Burma: It Can't Wait	–	Short film; director and producer	
2008	Management	Sue Claussen	Also executive producer	
2009	He's Just Not That Into You	Beth Murphy		
2009	Love Happens	Eloise Chandler		
2010	The Bounty Hunter	Nicole Hurley		
2010	The Switch	Kassie Larson	Also executive producer	
2011	Just Go with It	Katherine Murphy / Devlin Maccabee		
2011	Horrible Bosses	Dr. Julia Harris		
2012	Wanderlust	Linda Gergenblatt		
2012	$ellebrity	Herself		
2013	We're the Millers	Rose O'Reilly / Rose Miller / Sarah		
2013	Life of Crime	Margaret "Mickey" Dawson	Also executive producer	
2014	Horrible Bosses 2	Dr. Julia Harris		
2014	She's Funny That Way	Jane Claremont		
2014	Cake	Claire Bennett	Also executive producer	
2014	Journey to Sundance	Herself		
2015	Unity	Narrator		
2016	Mother's Day	Sandy Newhouse		
2016	Storks	Sarah Gardner (voice)		
2016	Office Christmas Party	Carol Vanstone		
2017	The Yellow Birds	Maureen Murphy	Also executive producer	
2018	Dumplin'	Rosie Dickson	Also executive producer	
2019	Murder Mystery	Audrey Spitz	Also executive producer	
2023	Murder Mystery 2	Audrey Spitz	Also producer	
2024	Out of My Mind	Melody's Inner Voice (voice)		
2026	Gail Daughtry and the Celebrity Sex Pass	Herself		
2027	Naughty †	Mallory	Filming	

== Television ==
Year	Title	Role	Notes	Ref.
1990	Molloy	Courtney Walker	Series regular (7 episodes)	
1990	Camp Cucamonga	Ava Schector	Television film	
1990–1991	Ferris Bueller	Jeannie Bueller	Series regular (13 episodes)	
1992–1993	The Edge	Various characters	Series regular (20 episodes)	
1992–1993	Herman's Head	Suzie Brooks	2 episodes	
1992	Quantum Leap	Kiki Wilson	Episode: "Nowhere to Run"	
1993	Sunday Funnies	Various characters	Television film	
1994	Burke's Law	Linda Campbell	Episode: "Who Killed the Beauty Queen?"	
1994	Muddling Through	Madeline Drego Cooper	Series regular (10 episodes)	
1994–2004	Friends	Rachel Green	Main role (236 episodes)	
1995–2016	Saturday Night Live	Herself / Host	4 episodes	
1996	Partners	CPA Suzanne	Episode: "Follow the Clams?"	
1998	Hercules	Galatea (voice)	Episode: "Hercules and the Dream Date"	
1999	South Park	Mrs. Stevens (voice)	Episode: "Rainforest Shmainforest"	
2003	King of the Hill	Pepperoni Sue / Stephanie (voice)	Episode: "Queasy Rider"	
2007	Dirt	Tina Harrod	Episode: "Ita Missa Est"	
2008	30 Rock	Claire Harper	Episode: "The One with the Cast of Night Court"	
2010	Cougar Town	Glenn	Episode: "All Mixed Up"	
2011	Five	None	Television film; also executive producer; Director of segment: "Mia"	
2012	Burning Love	Dana	Web series; 2 episodes	
2013	Call Me Crazy: A Five Film	None	Television film; executive producer	
2019–present	The Morning Show	Alex Levy	Lead role (40 episodes); also executive producer	
2021	Friends: The Reunion	Herself	HBO Max special; also executive producer	
2021	Live in Front of a Studio Audience	Blair Warner	Episode: "Diff'rent Strokes and The Facts of Life"	
2022	Norman Lear: 100 Years of Music and Laughter	Herself	Television special	
TBA	I'm Glad My Mom Died	Debra McCurdy	Also executive producer	

== Video games ==
Year	Title	Role	Ref.
1997	Steven Spielberg's Director's Chair	Herself/Laura	

== Music videos ==
Year	Title	Artist	Ref.
1994	"I'll Be There for You"	The Rembrandts	
1996	"Walls (Circus)"	Tom Petty and the Heartbreakers	
2001	"I Want to Be in Love"	Melissa Etheridge	

== Theater ==
Year	Production	Theater	Role	Ref.
1988	Dancing on Checker's Grave	St. Mark's Church in-the-Bowery	Lisa	
1988–1989	For Dear Life	The Public Theater	Emily	
1995	We Interrupt This Program	Tiffany Theater	—	
2006	Three Girls and Bob	American Airlines Theatre	Helena	
2009	Ramen Noodle	American Airlines Theatre	Danielle	
2010	The Bitch Downstairs	American Airlines Theatre	Dead dog (uncredited)	

== See also ==
- List of awards and nominations received by Jennifer Aniston
