= List of awards and nominations received by Jennifer Aniston =

Jennifer Aniston awards and nominations
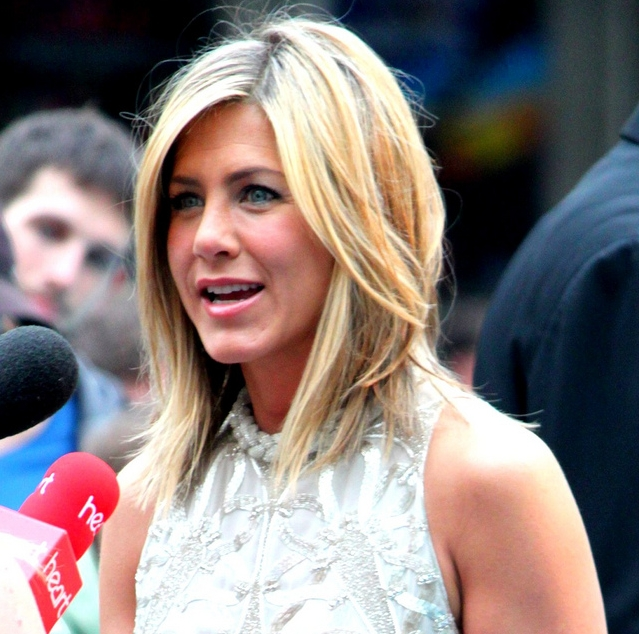
- Aniston in 2011 San Diego Comic-Con
Awards and nominations
Award	Wins	Nominations
Primetime Emmy Awards	1	10
Golden Globe Awards	1	7
Screen Actors Guild Awards	2	13

Totals (Note: Certain award groups do not simply award one winner. They acknowledge several different recipients, have runners-up, and have third place. Since this is a specific recognition and is different from losing an award, runner-up mentions are considered wins in this award tally. For simplification and to avoid errors, each award in this list has been presumed to have had a prior nomination.)
- Wins: 58
- Nominations: 148

Jennifer Aniston has been honored with accolades throughout her career. She received nominations for twelve Primetime Emmy Awards, seven Golden Globe Awards, and thirteen Screen Actors Guild Awards. Among these, She has won two Screen Actors Guild Award, a Primetime Emmy award and a Golden Globe.

For her role in the classic sitcom Friends, Aniston won the Screen Actors Guild Award for Outstanding Performance by an Ensemble in a Comedy Series in 1996, Primetime Emmy Award for Outstanding Lead Actress in a Comedy Series in 2002, and the Golden Globe Award for Best Actress – Television Series Musical or Comedy in 2003. She earned a Primetime Emmy Award nomination in 2009 for her guest starring role on the sitcom 30 Rock. For her performance in the 2014 drama Cake, she received Screen Actors Guild Award and Golden Globe Award nominations.

Since 2016, Aniston re-established herself as a prominent figure in television by executively producing acclaimed shows such as Little Fires Everywhere and Apple TV's The Morning Show, for which she won a SAG for Outstanding Performance by Lead a Female Actor in a Drama Series (2020) and earned nominations for two Primetime Emmy Awards for Outstanding Lead Actress in a Drama Series.

== Major Awards ==
=== Directors Guild Awards ===
The Directors Guild Awards are issued by the Directors Guild of America.

0 wins of 1 nomination

Year	Nominated work	Category	Result	Ref.
2012	Five	Outstanding Directorial Achievement in Movies for Television/Miniseries	Nominated	

=== Golden Globe Awards ===
The Golden Globe Awards are issued by the Hollywood Foreign Press Association (HFPA).

1 win of 8 nominations

Year	Nominated work	Category	Result	Ref.
2002	Friends	Best Supporting Actress – Series, Miniseries or Television Film	Nominated	
2003	Friends	Best Actress – Television Series Musical or Comedy	Won	
2015	Cake	Best Actress in a Motion Picture – Drama	Nominated	
2020	The Morning Show	Best Actress – Television Series Drama	Nominated	
2020	The Morning Show	Best Television Series – Drama (as Producer)	Nominated	
2022	The Morning Show	Best Actress – Television Series Drama	Nominated	
2022	The Morning Show	Best Television Series – Drama (as Producer)	Nominated	
2024	The Morning Show	Best Television Series – Drama (as Producer)	Nominated	

=== Independent Spirit Awards ===
0 wins of 1 nomination

Year	Nominated work	Category	Result	Ref.
2003	The Good Girl	Best Female Lead	Nominated	

=== Primetime Emmy Awards ===
The Primetime Emmy Awards are issued by the Academy of Television Arts & Sciences (ATAS).

1 win of 10 nominations

Year	Nominated work	Category	Result	Ref.
2000	Friends	Outstanding Supporting Actress in a Comedy Series	Nominated	
2001	Friends	Outstanding Supporting Actress in a Comedy Series	Nominated	
2002	Friends	Outstanding Lead Actress in a Comedy Series	Won	
2003	Friends	Outstanding Lead Actress in a Comedy Series	Nominated	
2004	Friends	Outstanding Lead Actress in a Comedy Series	Nominated	
2009	30 Rock	Outstanding Guest Actress in a Comedy Series	Nominated	
2020	The Morning Show	Outstanding Lead Actress in a Drama Series	Nominated	
2021	Friends: The Reunion	Outstanding Variety Special (Pre-Recorded)	Nominated	
2024	The Morning Show	Outstanding Lead Actress in a Drama Series	Nominated	
2024	The Morning Show	Outstanding Drama Series	Nominated	

=== Screen Actors Guild Awards ===
The Screen Actors Guild Awards are issued by the Screen Actors Guild-American Federation of Television and Radio Arts (SAG-AFTRA).

2 win of 15 nominations

Year	Nominated work	Category	Result	Ref.
1996	Friends	Outstanding Ensemble in a Comedy Series	Won (Note: Shared with the cast)	
1999	Friends	Outstanding Ensemble in a Comedy Series	Nominated	
2000	Friends	Outstanding Ensemble in a Comedy Series	Nominated	
2001	Friends	Outstanding Ensemble in a Comedy Series	Nominated	
2002	Friends	Outstanding Ensemble in a Comedy Series	Nominated	
2002	Friends	Outstanding Female Actor in a Comedy Series	Nominated	
2003	Friends	Outstanding Female Actor in a Comedy Series	Nominated	
2003	Friends	Outstanding Ensemble in a Comedy Series	Nominated	
2004	Friends	Outstanding Ensemble in a Comedy Series	Nominated	
2015	Cake	Outstanding Female Actor in a Leading Role	Nominated	
2020	The Morning Show	Outstanding Female Actor in a Drama Series	Won	
2022	The Morning Show	Outstanding Female Actor in a Drama Series	Nominated	
2022	The Morning Show	Outstanding Ensemble in a Drama Series	Nominated	
2024	The Morning Show	Outstanding Ensemble in a Drama Series	Nominated	
2024	The Morning Show	Outstanding Female Actor in a Drama Series	Nominated	

== Audience Awards ==
=== AACTA Audience Choice Awards ===
1 nomination

Year	Nominated work	Category	Result	Ref.
2024	—	Audience Choice Best Actress	Nominated	

=== Golden Schmoes Awards ===
1 win of 2 nominations

Year	Nominated work	Category	Result	Ref.
2011	Horrible Bosses	Best T&A of the Year	Won	
2013	We're the Millers	Best T&A of the Year	Nominated	

=== Guys Choice Awards ===
1 win of 1 nomination

Year	Nominated work	Category	Result	Ref.
2011	—N/a	Decade of Hotness	Honours	

=== MTV Movie + TV Awards ===
2 wins of 7 nominations

Year	Nominated work	Category	Result	Ref.
2004	Bruce Almighty	Best Kiss	Nominated (Note: Shared with Jim Carrey)	
2004	Along Came Polly	Best Dance Sequence	Nominated (Note: Shared with Ben Stiller)	
2011	Just Go with It	Best Female Performance	Nominated	
2012	Horrible Bosses	Best On-Screen Dirt Bag	Won	
2014	We're the Millers	Best Female Performance	Nominated	
2014	We're the Millers	Best Shirtless Performance	Nominated	
2014	We're the Millers	Best Kiss	Won (Note: Shared with Will Poulter & Emma Roberts)	

=== Nickelodeon Kids' Choice Awards ===
0 wins of 7 nominations

Year	Nominated work	Category	Result	Ref.
1997	Friends	Favorite Television Actress	Nominated	
1999	Friends	Favorite Television Actress	Nominated	
2000	Friends	Favorite Television Friends	Nominated (Note: Shared with Courteney Cox & Lisa Kudrow)	
2002	Friends	Favorite Television Actress	Nominated	
2003	Friends	Favorite Television Actress	Nominated	
2004	Friends	Favorite Television Actress	Nominated	
2009	Marley & Me	Favorite Movie Actress	Nominated	

=== People's Choice Awards ===
8 wins of 19 nominations

Year	Nominated work	Category	Result	Ref.
2001	Friends	Favorite Female Television Performer	Won	
2002	Friends	Favorite Female Television Performer	Won	
2003	Friends	Favorite Female Television Performer	Won	
2004	Friends	Favorite Female Television Performer	Won	
2006	—N/a	Favorite Olay Total Effects Make-Up Look	Won	
2007	The Break-Up	Favorite Female Movie Star	Won	
2007	The Break-Up	Favorite On-Screen Match-Up	Nominated (Note: Shared with Vince Vaughn)	
2010	He's Just Not That Into You	Favorite Movie Actress	Nominated	
2011	The Switch	Favorite Movie Actress	Nominated	
2012	Just Go with It; Horrible Bosses	Favorite Movie Actress	Nominated	
2012	Just Go with It; Horrible Bosses	Favorite Comedic Movie Actress	Nominated	
2013	Wanderlust	Favorite Comedic Movie Actress	Won	
2014	We're the Millers	Favorite Movie Actress	Nominated	
2014	We're the Millers	Favorite Comedic Movie Actress	Nominated	
2014	We're the Millers	Favorite Movie Duo	Nominated (Note: Shared with Jason Sudeikis)	
2019	—N/a	People's Icon of 2019	Honours	
2019	Murder Mystery	Favorite Movie Actress	Nominated	
2024	The Morning Show	Drama TV Star of the Year	Won	
2024	The Morning Show	Female TV Star of the Year	Nominated	

=== Teen Choice Awards ===
6 wins of 16 nominations

Year	Nominated work	Category	Result	Ref.
2002	—N/a	Choice Female Hottie	Nominated	
2002	Friends	Choice TV Actress: Comedy	Won	
2003	Friends	Choice TV Actress: Comedy	Won	
2003	The Good Girl	Choice Movie Actress: Drama/Action-Adventure	Won	
2003	The Good Girl	Choice Movie: Liar	Nominated	
2003	The Good Girl	Choice Movie: Liplock	Nominated (Note: Shared with Jake Gyllenhaal)	
2003	Bruce Almighty	Choice Movie Actress: Comedy	Nominated	
2004	Friends	Choice TV Actress: Comedy	Won	
2006	The Break-Up	Choice Movie Actress: Comedy	Nominated	
2006	The Break-Up	Choice Movie: Chemistry	Won	
2009	Marley & Me; He's Just Not That Into You	Choice Movie Actress: Comedy	Nominated	
2011	Just Go with It	Choice Movie Actress: Romantic Comedy	Nominated	
2011	Just Go with It	Choice Movie: Chemistry	Won (Note: Shared with Adam Sandler)	
2014	We're the Millers	Choice Movie: Liplock	Nominated	
2016	Mother's Day	Choice Movie Actress: Comedy	Nominated	
2019	Murder Mystery	Choice Summer Movie Actress	Nominated	

== Critic & Association Awards ==
=== Alliance of Women Film Journalists Awards ===
2 wins of 4 nominations

Year	Nominated work	Category	Result	Ref.
2011	The Bounty Hunter	Actress Most In Need of a New Agent	Won	
2012	Just Go with It	Actress Most In Need of a New Agent	Nominated	
2015	Horrible Bosses 2	Actress Most In Need of a New Agent	Nominated	
2017	Mother's Day; Office Christmas Party	Actress Most In Need of a New Agent	Won	

=== Critics Choice Awards ===
0 wins of 3 nominations

Year	Nominated work	Category	Result	Ref.
2015	Cake	Best Actress	Nominated	
2024	The Morning Show	Best Actress in a Drama Series	Nominated	
2024	The Morning Show	Best Drama Series (as Producer)	Nominated	

=== GLAAD Media Awards ===
1 win of 1 nomination

Year	Nominated work	Category	Result	Ref.
2007	—N/a	Vanguard Award	Honours	

=== Hollywood Film Awards ===
1 win of 1 nomination

Year	Nominated work	Category	Result	Ref.
2002	The Good Girl	Actress of the Year	Won	

=== Online Film & Television Association Awards ===
2 wins of 12 nominations

Year	Nominated work	Category	Result	Ref.
1997	Friends	Best Ensemble in a Series	Nominated	
1997	Friends	Best Ensemble in a Comedy Series	Won	
1998	Friends	Best Ensemble in a Series	Nominated	
1998	Friends	Best Ensemble in a Comedy Series	Nominated	
1999	Friends	Best Ensemble in a Comedy Series	Nominated	
2000	Friends	Best Supporting Actress in a Comedy Series	Nominated	
2000	Friends	Best Ensemble in a Comedy Series	Nominated	
2001	Friends	Best Supporting Actress in a Comedy Series	Nominated	
2001	Friends	Best Ensemble in a Comedy Series	Nominated	
2002	Friends	Best Lead Actress in a Comedy Series	Won	
2009	30 Rock	Best Guest Actress in a Comedy Series	Nominated	
2019	The Morning Show	Best Actress in a Drama Series	Nominated	

=== Online Film Critics Society Awards ===
0 wins of 1 nomination

Year	Nominated work	Category	Result	Ref.
2003	The Good Girl	Best Lead Actress	Nominated	

=== SAG-AFTRA Foundation ===
1 win of 1 nominations

Year	Nominated work	Category	Result	Ref.
2019	—N/a	Artists Inspiration Award	Honours	

=== Village Voice Film Poll ===
1 win of 1 nominations

Year	Nominated work	Category	Result	Ref.
2014	Cake	Best Actress	Nominated	

=== Women's Image Network Awards ===
1 win of 2 nominations

Year	Nominated work	Category	Result	Ref.
2011	The Switch	Actress Feature Film	Nominated	
2012	Five	Outstanding Show Produced By A Woman	Won	

== Film Festival Awards ==
=== Capri-Hollywood International Film Festival Awards ===
1 win of 1 nomination

Year	Nominated work	Category	Result	Ref.
2014	Cake	Best Actress	Won	

=== CineVegas International Film Festival Awards ===
1 win of 1 nomination

Year	Nominated work	Category	Result	Ref.
2007	Room 10	Best Short Film	Won	

=== Giffoni Film Festival Awards ===
1 win of 1 nomination

Year	Nominated work	Category	Result	Ref.
2016	—N/a	Experience Award	Honours	

=== Santa Barbara International Film Festival Awards ===
1 win of 1 nomination

Year	Nominated work	Category	Result	Ref.
2015	—N/a	Montecito Award	Honours	

=== ShoWest Convention Awards ===
1 win of 1 nomination

Year	Nominated work	Category	Result	Ref.
2005	—N/a	Female Star of the Year	Honours	

== International Awards ==
=== Aftonbladet TV Prize Awards ===
4 wins of 4 nominations

Year	Nominated work	Category	Result	Ref.
2001	Friends	Best Foreign Television Personality - Female	Won	
2002	Friends	Best Foreign Television Personality - Female	Won	
2003	Friends	Best Foreign Television Personality - Female	Won	
2004	Friends	Best Foreign Television Personality - Female	Won	

=== American Comedy Awards ===
0 wins of 3 nominations

Year	Nominated work	Category	Result	Ref.
1996	Friends	Funniest Supporting Female Performer in a Television Series	Nominated	
1999	Friends	Funniest Supporting Female Performer in a Television Series	Nominated	
2001	Friends	Funniest Supporting Female Performer in a Television Series	Nominated	

=== Jupiter Awards ===
0 wins of 1 nomination

Year	Nominated work	Category	Result	Ref.
2016	She's Funny That Way	Best International Actress	Nominated	

=== Logie Awards ===
1 win of 1 nomination

Year	Nominated work	Category	Result	Ref.
2004	Friends	Most Popular Overseas Star	Won	

=== National Movie Awards ===
0 wins of 1 nomination

Year	Nominated work	Category	Result	Ref.
2011	Just Go with It	Best Performance of the Year	Nominated	

=== Russian National Movie Awards ===
0 wins of 3 nominations

Year	Nominated work	Category	Result	Ref.
2012	Just Go with It	Best Foreign Actress of the Year	Nominated	
2014	We're the Millers	Best Foreign Actress of the Year	Nominated	
2014	—N/a	Best Foreign Actress of the Decade	Nominated	

== Miscellaneous Awards ==
=== AARP Movies for Grownups Awards ===
0 win of 1 nomination

Year	Nominated work	Category	Result	Ref.
2021	The Morning Show	Best Actress - Television	Nominated	

=== Elle Women in Hollywood Awards ===
1 win of 1 nomination

Year	Nominated work	Category	Result	Ref.
2011	—N/a	Woman of the Year	Honours	

=== Golden Raspberry Awards ===
0 wins of 5 nominations

Year	Nominated work	Category	Result	Ref.
1997	She's the One	Worst New Star	Nominated	
2011	The Bounty Hunter	Worst Actress	Nominated	
2011	The Switch	Worst Actress	Nominated	
2011	The Bounty Hunter	Worst Screen Couple	Nominated (Note: Shared with Gerard Butler)	
2012	Just Go with It	Worst Screen Couple	Nominated	
2015	Cake	Razzie Redeemer Award	Nominated	

=== Gracie Allen Awards ===
1 win of 1 nomination

Year	Nominated work	Category	Result	Ref.
2012	Five	Outstanding Drama	Won	

=== People Magazine Awards ===
1 win of 1 nomination

Year	Nominated work	Category	Result	Ref.
2014	Cake	Movie Performance of the Year - Female	Won	

=== Satellite Awards ===
0 wins of 3 nominations

Year	Nominated work	Category	Result	Ref.
2000	Friends	Best Actress in a Series - Comedy or Musical	Nominated	
2003	Friends	Best Actress in a Series - Comedy or Musical	Nominated	
2003	The Good Girl	Best Actress in a Motion Picture - Comedy or Musical	Nominated	

=== Shorty Awards ===
0 wins of 1 nomination

Year	Nominated work	Category	Result	Ref.
2020	—N/a	Best Celebrity	Nominated	

=== The Hollywood Reporter ===
1 win of 1 nomination

Year	Nominated work	Category	Result	Ref.
2021	—N/a	Sherry Lansing Leadership Award	Honours	

=== TV Guide Awards ===
1 win of 1 nomination

Year	Nominated work	Category	Result	Ref.
2000	Friends	Editor's Choice Award	Won	

=== TV Land Awards ===
0 wins of 5 nominations

Year	Nominated work	Category	Result	Ref.
2005	Friends	Little Screen/Big Screen Star	Nominated	
2006	Friends	Little Screen/Big Screen Star	Nominated	
2006	Friends	Most Memorable Kiss	Nominated (Note: Shared with David Schwimmer)	
2007	Friends	Little Screen/Big Screen Star	Nominated	
2007	Friends	Break-Up That Was So Bad It Was Good	Nominated	

=== Walk of Fame Star ===
1 win of 1 nomination

Year	Nominated work	Category	Result	Ref.
2012	—N/a	6270 Hollywood, Blvd. - Motion Picture	Honours	

=== Women in Film Crystal + Lucy Awards ===
1 win of 1 nomination

Year	Nominated work	Category	Result	Ref.
2009	—N/a	Crystal Award	Honours	
