= Kevin Powers =

American novelist (born 1980)

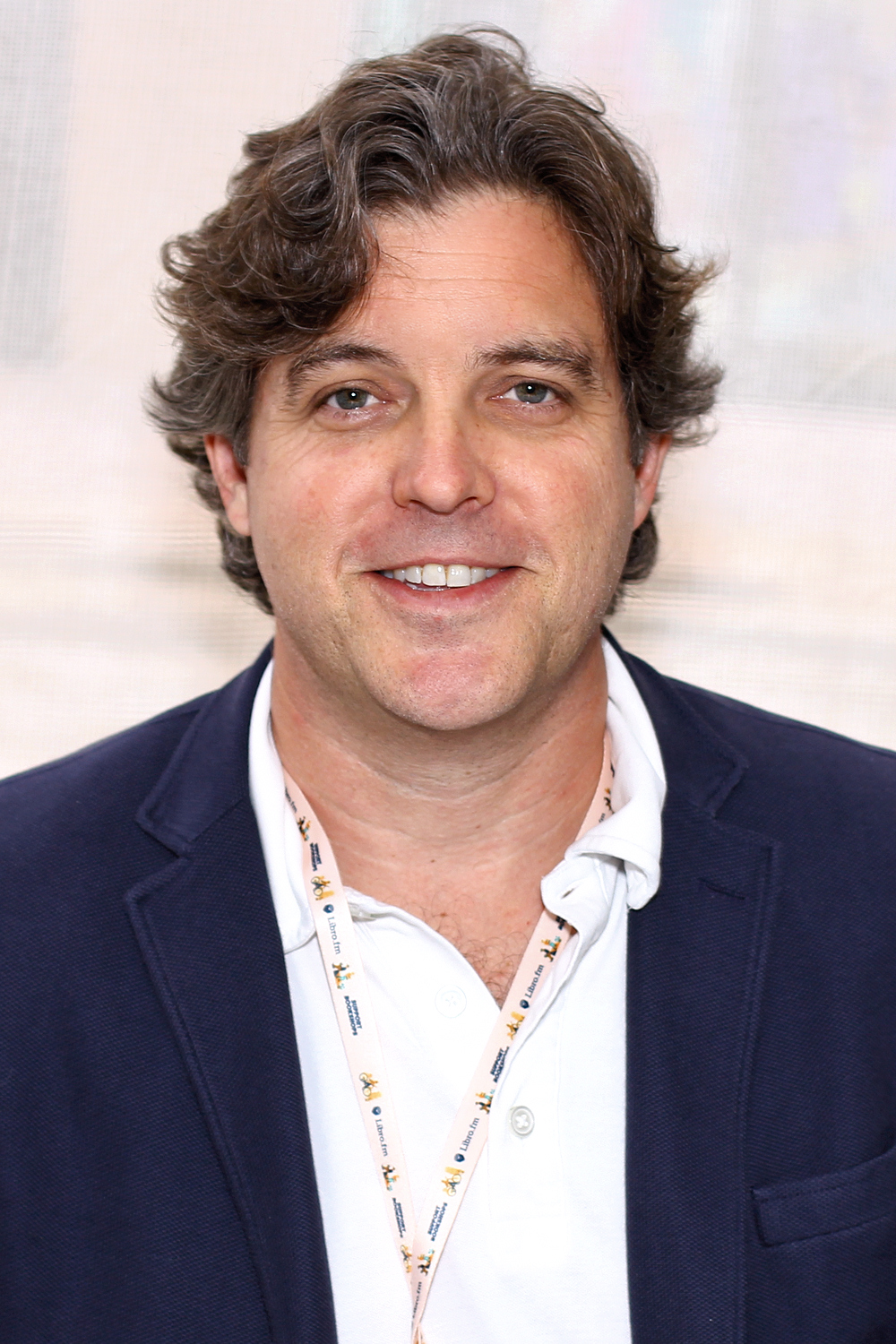
- Powers at the 2023 Texas Book Festival
- Born: Richmond, Virginia, US
- Education: Virginia Commonwealth University; University of Texas at Austin
- Occupations: Novelist; poet; soldier
- Writing career
- Language: English
- Period: 2012–present (as an author)
- Genre: Literary fiction
- Subject: Iraq War
- Notable work: The Yellow Birds (2012)
- Website: kevincpowers.com

Kevin Powers is an American fiction writer, poet, and Iraq War veteran.

== Early life, tour, and education ==
Powers was born and raised in Richmond, Virginia, the son of a factory worker and a postman. He attended James River High School and enlisted in the U.S. Army at the age of seventeen. Six years later, in 2004, he served a one-year tour in Iraq as a machine gunner assigned to an engineer unit. Powers served in Mosul and Tal Afar, Iraq, from February 2004 to March 2005. After his honorable discharge, Powers enrolled in Virginia Commonwealth University, where he graduated in 2008 with a bachelor's degree in English. He holds an MFA from the University of Texas at Austin, where he was a Michener Fellow in Poetry.

== The Yellow Birds ==
Powers's first novel The Yellow Birds, which drew on his experiences in the Iraq War, garnered a lucrative advance from publisher Michael Pietsch at Little, Brown. It has been called "a classic of contemporary war fiction" by Michiko Kakutani, book critic for The New York Times. The magazine subsequently named the novel one of the publication's 10 favorite books of 2012. Wrote Kakutani: "At once a freshly imagined bildungsroman and a metaphysical parable about the loss of innocence and the uses of memory, it's a novel that will stand with Tim O'Brien's enduring Vietnam book, The Things They Carried (1990), as a classic of contemporary war fiction."

In an interview with The Guardian, Powers expounded his motivation for writing The Yellow Birds: "One of the reasons that I wrote this book was the idea that people kept saying: 'What was it like over there?' It seemed that it was not an information-based problem. There was lots of information around. But what people really wanted was to know what it felt like; physically, emotionally and psychologically."

Asked about the best book of 2012, writer Dave Eggers said this to The Observer: "There are a bunch of books I could mention, but the book I find myself pushing on people more than any other is The Yellow Birds by Kevin Powers. The author fought in Iraq with the US army, and then, many years later, this gorgeous novel emerged. Next to The Forever War by Dexter Filkins, it's the best thing I've read about the war in Iraq, and by far the best novel. Powers is a poet first, so the book is spare, incredibly precise, unimproveable. And it's easily the saddest book I've read in many years. But sad in an important way."

Not all critics were so laudatory of The Yellow Birds, however. Ron Charles of The Washington Post wrote that "frankly, the parts of The Yellow Birds are better than the whole. Some chapters lack sufficient power, others labor under the influence of classic war stories, rather than arising organically from the author's unique vision." Michael Larson of Salon argues that the book is ruined by "boggy lyricism ... There's never a sky not worthy of a few adjectives." And Theo Tait of the London Review of Books argued that the book "labours under the weight of a massive Hemingway crush ... a trainwreck, from the first inept and imprecise simile, to the tin-eared rhythms, to the final incoherent thought."

The book has been adapted on screen in 2017, The Yellow Birds was directed by Alexandre Moors and starred Jack Huston, Alden Ehrenreich, Tye Sheridan and Jennifer Aniston.

== Awards and honors ==
Year	Title	Award	Category	Result	Ref.
2012	The Yellow Birds	Flaherty-Dunnan First Novel Prize	—	Shortlisted	
2012	The Yellow Birds	Guardian First Book Award	—	Won	
2012	The Yellow Birds	National Book Award	Fiction	Shortlisted	
2013	The Yellow Birds	Anisfield-Wolf Book Award	—	Won	
2013	The Yellow Birds	PEN/Hemingway Award for Debut Novel	—	Won	
2014	The Yellow Birds	International Dublin Literary Award	—	Longlisted	
2014	Letter Composed During a Lull in the Fighting	Forward Prizes for Poetry	First Collection	Shortlisted	

== Works ==
- —— (2012). The Yellow Birds: A Novel. Little, Brown and Company. ISBN 9780316219365.
- —— (2014). Letters Composed During a Lull in the Fighting: Poems. Little, Brown and Company. ISBN 9780316401081.
- —— (2018). A Shout in the Ruins: A Novel. Little, Brown and Company. ISBN 9780316556477.
- —— (2023). A Line in the Sand. Little, Brown and Company. ISBN 9780316507127.
- —— (2026). Children of the Wild. Harper. ISBN 9780063488571.
