= The Yellow Birds =

2012 novel by Kevin Powers

- First edition cover image
- Author: Kevin Powers
- Cover artist: Oliver Munday
- Language: English
- Genre: Fiction, Novel
- Publisher: Little, Brown and Company
- Publication date: 11 September 2012
- Publication place: United States
- Media type: Print (hardcover)
- Pages: 226
- ISBN: 9781444756166

The Yellow Birds is the debut novel from American writer, poet, and Iraq War veteran Kevin Powers. It was one of The New York Times's 100 Most Notable Books of 2012 and a finalist for the 2012 National Book Award. It was awarded the 2012 the Guardian First Book Award and the 2013 PEN/Hemingway Award for Debut Novel.

== Background ==
Much of the novel draws upon Powers's experience serving a year as a machine gunner in Mosul and Tal Afar, Iraq, from February 2004 to March 2005 after enlisting in the Army at the age of 17. After his honorable discharge, Powers enrolled in Virginia Commonwealth University, where he graduated in 2008 with a bachelor's degree in English. He holds an MFA from the University of Texas at Austin, where he was a Michener Fellow in Poetry.

Powers has said that the novel took him about four years to write. He also comes from a military family as "his father and grandfathers both served, and his uncle was a Marine."

With regard to the autobiographical elements of the novel, Powers says: "The core of what Bartle goes through, I empathised with it. I felt those things, and asked the same questions: is there anything about this that's redeeming; does asking in itself have value? The story is invented, but there's a definite alignment between his emotional and mental life and mine."

== Plot ==
The Yellow Birds begins with "The war tried to kill us in the spring" and follows Private John Bartle, the novel's protagonist and narrator, in Al Tafar, Iraq; Fort Dix, New Jersey; Kaiserslautern, Germany; the author's and narrator's hometown of Richmond, Virginia; and Fort Knox, Kentucky, from December 2003 to April 2009.

Much of the novel focuses on Bartle's promise to the mother of Murph, a fellow private, to not let him die in the war. Bartle and Murph also make a pact not to be the 1,000th casualty in the war. The reader learns in the beginning of the novel, however, that Murph dies in the war.

The Yellow Birds also examines the reactions of soldiers after their deployments. Bartle enters a state in which he does not want to leave his house upon his return from the war and slowly deteriorates as the novel progresses. Powers has stated: "I wanted to show the whole picture. It's not just: you get off the plane, you're back home, everything's fine. Maybe the physical danger ends, but soldiers are still deeply at risk of being injured in a different way. I thought it was important to acknowledge that."

The title of the novel alludes to a story Murph tells Bartle while on a guard tower about when Murph's "father brought a dozen caged canaries home from the mine and let them loose in the hollow where they lived, how the canaries only flitted and sang awhile before perching back atop their cages, which had been arranged in rows, his father likely thinking that the birds would not return by choice to their captivity, and that the cages should be used for something else: a pretty bed for vegetables, perhaps a place to string up candles between the trees, and in what strange silences the world worked, Murph must have wondered, as the birds settled peaceably in their formation and ceased to sing."

== Themes ==
Epigraph to The Yellow Birds

"A yellow bird

With a yellow bill,

Was perched upon

My windowsill.

I lured him in

With a piece of bread

And then I smashed

His fucking head ..."

— Traditional U.S. Army marching cadence

For Powers, the epigraph has come to stand for: "the lack of control soldiers have over what happens to them. The war proceeds, no matter what you think or do; it's an entity unto itself. You're powerless, and powerlessness itself becomes the enemy. That was my emotional experience of the war. The idea of the bird resonated with the core of what I was trying to get at."

One of the major themes of The Yellow Birds is the separation between the American public and soldiers fighting overseas, which has dominated much of the Iraq War. It reflects the idea that Thomas Friedman and Michael Mandelbaum put forward in their book, That Used to Be Us: "We have also outsourced sacrifice. If World War II was 'the good war,' and the Korean War 'the forgotten war,' and Vietnam 'the controversial war,' the conflict that began with the attacks of September 11, 2001, and has sent U.S. troops to Afghanistan and Iraq for nearly a decade can be called 'the 1 percent war.' The troops deployed to these combat zones and their immediate families make up less than 1 percent of the population of the United States. The rest of us contribute nothing. We won't even increase our taxes, even through a surcharge on gasoline to pay for these wars. So we end up asking 1 percent of the country to make the ultimate sacrifice and the other 99 percent to make no sacrifice at all."

With regard to the lack of connection between U.S. forces and the general public, Powers has said: "But I also felt powerful resentment that it seemed like nobody cared that we had gotten into this thing without thinking what the consequences would be...In some ways, the dialogue itself is missing. It seems the public conversation has disappeared. There are still soldiers in Afghanistan right now. There might be a wounded soldier as we speak who is feeling his life slipping away from him. And it doesn't warrant a mention in some venues. I think that's tragic."

== Reception ==
In a review for The New York Times Benjamin Percy writes: "…The Yellow Birds joins the conversation with books like Leslie Marmon Silko's "Ceremony," Brian Turner's Phantom Noise and Tim O'Brien's classic, The Things They Carried — and wakes the readers of 'the spoiled cities of America' to a reality most would rather not face. Percy quotes the novel, writing: "Here we are, fretting over our Netflix queues while halfway around the world people are being blown to bits. And though we might slap a yellow ribbon magnet to our truck's tailgate, though we might shake a soldier's hand in the airport, we ignore the fact that in America an average of 18 veterans are said to commit suicide every day. What a shame, we say, and then move on quickly to whatever other agonies and entertainments occupy the headlines."

Michiko Kakutani included it as one of her 10 favorite books of 2012 and called it: "a deeply affecting book that conveys the horrors of combat with harrowing poetry. At once a freshly imagined bildungsroman and a metaphysical parable about the loss of innocence and the uses of memory."

== Awards ==
The novel won an Anisfield-Wolf Book Award. Juror Joyce Carol Oates praised its capacity to depict a minority culture in the United States, that of military service. The National Book Award citation describes The Yellow Birds as: "Poetic, precise, and moving, The Yellow Birds is a work of fiercest principle, honoring loss while at the same time indicting the pieties of war...An urgent, vital, beautiful novel that reminds us through its scrupulous honesty how rarely its anguished truths are told."

Year	Award	Category	Result	Ref.
2012	Flaherty-Dunnan First Novel Prize	—	Shortlisted	
2012	Guardian First Book Award	—	Won	
2012	National Book Award	Fiction	Shortlisted	
2013	Anisfield-Wolf Book Award	—	Won	
2013	PEN/Hemingway Award for Debut Novel	—	Won	
2014	International Dublin Literary Award	—	Longlisted	

== Adaptation ==
The book was adapted on screen in 2017, The Yellow Birds was directed by Alexandre Moors and starred Jack Huston, Alden Ehrenreich, Tye Sheridan and Jennifer Aniston.
