= Call Me Crazy: A Five Film =

2013 television film

- DVD cover
- Created by: Marta Kauffman
- Written by: Deirdre O'Connor; Jan Oxenberg; Howard J. Morris; Stephen Godchaux; Erin Cressida Wilson
- Directed by: Bryce Dallas Howard; Laura Dern; Sharon Maguire; Bonnie Hunt; Ashley Judd
- Starring: Jennifer Hudson; Sarah Hyland; Melissa Leo; Octavia Spencer; Brittany Snow
- Composer: Alex Wurman
- Country of origin: United States
- Original language: English

Production
- Executive producers: Jennifer Aniston; Kristin Hahn; Kevin Chinoy; Francesca Silvestri; Marta Kauffman
- Producer: Jeff Freilich
- Cinematography: Gale Tattersall; Andre Lascaris; Dermott Downs; Karl Walter Lindenlaub
- Editors: Monty DeGraff; Don Brochu; Tessa Davis; Byron Smith
- Running time: 88 minutes
- Production companies: Echo Films; Sony Pictures Television

Original release
- Network: Lifetime
- Release: April 20, 2013

Related
- Five

Call Me Crazy: A Five Film is a 2013 American drama anthology television film which premiered on Lifetime on April 20, 2013. It is a sequel to the 2011 film Five.

== Plot ==
An anthology of five short films exploring the impact and stigma of mental illness. Three of the five stories are connected.

Lucy follows the film's title character, a law student who finds herself amidst the horror of schizophrenia, landing her in an institution where, through the support of a new friend, meds and her psychotherapist, she begins her path to not only healing, but also a promising future.

Grace explores bipolar disorder through the experience of a teenage daughter whose mother grapples with the condition.

Allison weaves together comedy and family drama in a story about healing when an eldest daughter Lucy, the subject of the first segment, returns home from inpatient treatment and spoils her sister Allison's unveiling of her new boyfriend to their parents.

Eddie delves into the world of depression as seen through the eyes of a comedian's wife as she grapples with understanding how her husband Eddie, who is so loved, can be so withdrawn and overcome with sadness.

Maggie, a female veteran returns home from war to her son and father, only to have her life shattered by the onset of posttraumatic stress disorder and her memories of being sexually assaulted.

== Cast and crew ==
=== Lucy ===
- Brittany Snow as Lucy
- Clint Howard as Harold
- Jason Ritter as Bruce
- Octavia Spencer as Dr. Nance

Directed by Bryce Dallas Howard and written by Deirdre O'Connor.

=== Grace ===
- Sarah Hyland as Grace
- Melissa Leo as Robin
- Melissa Farman as Izzy
- Aimee Teegarden as Olivia
- Andrea Bendewald as Laura

Directed by Laura Dern and written by Jan Oxenberg.

=== Allison ===
- Brittany Snow as Lucy
- Sofia Vassilieva as Allison
- Ken Baumann as Luke
- Jean Smart as Claire
- Richard Gilliland as Hugh

Directed by Sharon Maguire and written by Howard J. Morris.

=== Eddie ===
- Mitch Rouse as Eddie
- Lea Thompson as Julia
- Chelsea Handler as Alex
- Dave Foley as Danny
- Jay Chandrasekhar as Joey
- James Avery as Dr. Beckett
- Ross Mathews as MC

Directed by Bonnie Hunt and written by Stephen Godchaux.

=== Maggie ===
- Jennifer Hudson as Maggie
- Melanie Griffith as Kristin
- Ernie Hudson as Percy
- Brittany Snow as Lucy

Directed by Ashley Judd and written by Erin Cressida Wilson.

== Accolades ==
Year	Award	Category	Recipient	Outcome
2013	Health Awards	Primetime Drama – Major Storyline		Won
2014	Black Reel Awards	Best Supporting Actor: Television Movie/Cable	Ernie Hudson	Nominated
2014	Black Reel Awards	Black Reel Award for Best Supporting Actress: Television Movie/Cable	Octavia Spencer	Won
2014	Satellite Awards	Satellite Award for Best Actress – Miniseries or Television Film	Melissa Leo	Nominated
2014	Gracie Awards	Outstanding Performance by a Cast in a Drama		Won
2014	Prism Awards	TV Movie or Miniseries		Won
2014	Prism Awards	Best Ensemble Cast		Won
