= Tumbledown (2015 film) =

- Theatrical release poster
- Directed by: Sean Mewshaw
- Written by: Desiree Van Til
- Produced by: Aaron L. Gilbert; Kristin Hahn; Margot Hand
- Starring: Rebecca Hall; Jason Sudeikis; Dianna Agron; Blythe Danner; Griffin Dunne; Joe Manganiello; Richard Masur
- Cinematography: Seamus Tierney
- Edited by: Suzy Elmiger
- Music by: Daniel Hart
- Production companies: Bron Studios; Hahnscape Entertainment
- Distributed by: Starz Digital
- Release dates: April 18, 2015 (Tribeca); February 5, 2016 (United States)
- Running time: 103 minutes
- Country: United States
- Language: English
- Box office: $230,000

Tumbledown is a 2015 American romantic comedy drama film directed by Sean Mewshaw, written by Desiree Van Til, and starring Rebecca Hall, Jason Sudeikis, Dianna Agron and Joe Manganiello. It was released on February 5, 2016, by Starz Digital.

== Premise ==
A young widow falls for a New York writer who comes to her hometown in rural Maine to investigate the death of her husband, a folk singer.

== Cast ==
- Rebecca Hall as Hannah Miles
- Jason Sudeikis as Andrew McCabe
- Dianna Agron as Finley
- Joe Manganiello as Curtis
- Griffin Dunne as Upton
- Richard Masur as Bruce Jespersen
- Blythe Danner as Linda Jespersen
- Maggie Castle as Shannon

== Production ==
On April 19, 2013, it was announced that Sean Mewshaw would direct the romantic comedy on the script of Desiree Van Til; producers would be Kristin Hahn of Indigo Films and Aaron L. Gilbert and Margot Hand of Bron Studios. Jason Sudeikis and Rose Byrne were set to play the lead roles, Sudeikis as a New York writer and Byrne as a young widow. Olivia Munn, Joe Manganiello, Blythe Danner, Michael McKean and Beau Bridges were also set to co-star in the film. On January 30, 2014, Rebecca Hall joined the cast, replacing Byrne. On March 31, 2014 Dianna Agron, Griffin Dunne and Richard Masur joined the cast while filming was underway in Devens.

=== Filming ===
In April 2013, filming was set to begin in October in Vancouver, British Columbia. Van Til also looked at shooting in Maine, California and New York. Ultimately she settled on Massachusetts, due to the state's “robust film incentive program” which would help with the $4 million budget.

So, In January 2014 the production was scheduled to begin in late March in Massachusetts. The shooting of the film began on March 23, 2014, in Princeton, Massachusetts. Filming also reportedly took place at New England Studios in Devens.

== Release ==
The film premiered at the Tribeca Film Festival on April 18, 2015 and was released on February 5, 2016 by Starz Digital.

== Reception ==
Tumbledown received generally positive reviews. On Rotten Tomatoes, it has a rating of 70%, based on 37 reviews, with an average rating of 6.32/10. On Metacritic, the film has a score of 60 out of 100, based on 14 critics, indicating "mixed or average reviews".
