= A Little Monk =

- Theatrical poster
- Directed by: Joo Kyung-jung
- Written by: Ham Se-deok, Joo Kyung-jung
- Produced by: Ji Yeon-suk
- Starring: Kim Tae-jin
- Edited by: Ko Im-pyo
- Distributed by: Spectrum Film Korea
- Release date: April 11, 2003
- Running time: 99 minutes
- Country: South Korea
- Language: Korean

A Little Monk (Korean: 동승; RR: Dongseung) is a 2003 South Korean film helmed by first-time director Joo Kyung-jung. It was chosen as one of the "10 Best Korean Films" in 2003 by the Korean Association of Film Critics Awards.

== Plot ==
Three monks—the abbot, a teen and a child—live in a secluded mountain temple. The child is unhappy there and longs for his mother to return for him. The teen cannot forget a pretty girl he meets and decides to leave, and the abbot takes care of them.

== Cast ==
- Kim Tae-jin as little monk
- Kim Ye-ryeong as widow
- Kim Min-kyo as Jeong-shim
- O Yeong-su as temple master
- Jeon Moo-song as woodcutter

== Awards and nominations ==
Year	Award	Category	Recipient	Result
2002	Shanghai International Film Festival	Golden Goblet Award for Best Screenplay	Joo Kyung-jung	Won
2003	Tiburon International Film Festival	Humanitarian Award: Best Children Film	A Little Monk	Won
2003	Asia Pacific Screen Awards	Best Director	Joo Kyung-jung	Won
