= Kristin Hahn =

American film producer, writer, director (born 1969)

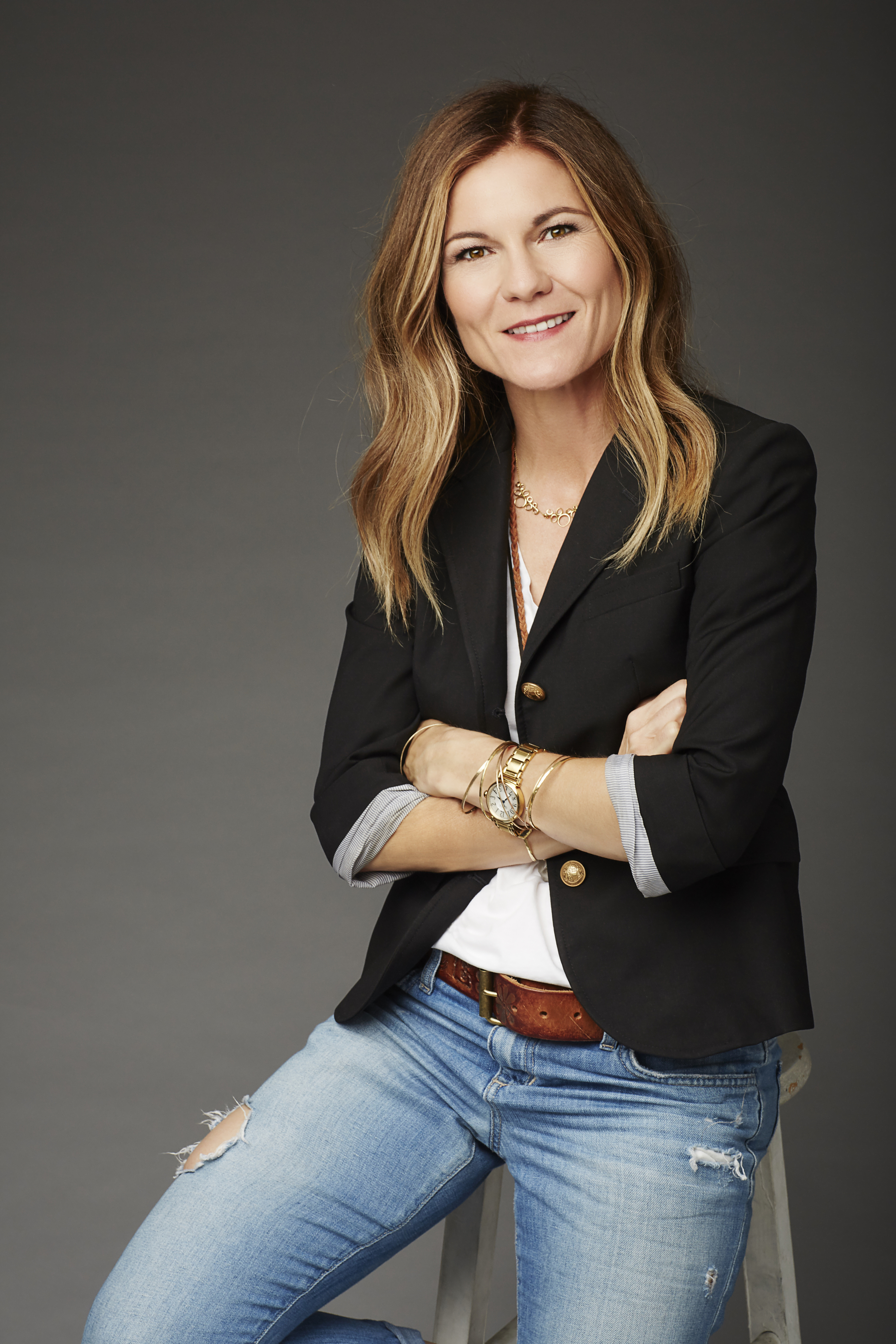
- Hahn in 2015
- Born: 1969 (age 56–57); Omaha, Nebraska, U.S.
- Occupations: Film producer; writer; director
- Years active: 1988–present
- Children: 2

Kristin Hahn (born 1969) is an American film and television producer, writer and director. Hahn is the founder and president of production company, Hahnscape Entertainment, and the co-founder of production company Echo Films, alongside Jennifer Aniston. Prior to Echo Films, Hahn co-founded Plan B Entertainment with Jennifer Aniston and Brad Pitt where she served as executive producer on the Academy Award-winning The Departed, and co-producer on The Time Traveler's Wife.

== Career ==
Hahn was born in Omaha, Nebraska and later moved to New Mexico. She relocated to Los Angeles to attend USC Film School.

At the age of 15, being raised by her mother, she watched many movies and became interested in becoming a storyteller. At 18, she moved to Los Angeles.

While she was a film student at the University of Southern California, she also worked for Bob Ellison as his assistant for 3 years, where she learned about writing.

Hahn began her career as a theater producer, shepherding six productions including Maps for Drowners, the first play in Los Angeles to address the AIDS epidemic.

Hahn co-directed, wrote and produced the documentary feature, Anthem. The film features interviews with Hunter S. Thompson, Willie Nelson, Robert Redford, George McGovern, Studs Terkel and poet laureate, Rita Dove. The doc was dubbed "essential viewing" by Variety, "illuminating" by The Hollywood Reporter, and "one of the most charming and thought-provoking documentaries of the year!" by Chicago Tribune. She also co-wrote the companion book, Anthem: An American Road Story, published by HarperCollins.

In 2002, Hahn published her second book with HarperCollins. In Search of Grace: A Religious Outsider's Journey Across America's Landscape of Faith.

In 2008, Hahn and Jennifer Aniston formed the production company Echo Films. Through Echo Films, Hahn executive produced The Switch starring Jennifer Aniston and Jason Bateman. She also executive produced the franchise television projects, Five, and Five: Call Me Crazy.

In 2014, Hahn executive produced Cake, starring Jennifer Aniston as a chronic pain sufferer. Hahn executive produced The Yellow Birds, written by David Lowery and directed by Alexandre Moors, starring Tye Sheridan, Alden Ehrenreich and Jennifer Aniston.

Hahn adapted Julie Murphy’s New York Times best-selling novel, Dumplin’, starring Danielle Macdonald and Jennifer Aniston. She also served as Producer. The film was released on Netflix in 2018. It was described by Deadline as "a triumph for all the women behind of and in front of the scenes", and The Atlantic said "the movie itself represents a new, valuable kind of narrative".

Hahn is an executive producer on the Apple TV+ drama, The Morning Show, starring Jennifer Aniston and Reese Witherspoon. She was nominated for a Producers Guild of America Award and a Golden Globe for her work on the show.

In 2015, Hahn founded production company, Hahnscape Entertainment. Hahnscape's first feature film release was Tumbledown, starring Jason Sudeikis and Rebecca Hall. It premiered at the Tribeca Film Festival in 2015. Leonard Maltin said "Indie films like Tumbledown deserve all the breaks they can get. This one rewards the viewer with a typically fine performance by Rebecca Hall and a revelatory one by Jason Sudeikis".

Under her Hahnscape banner, Kristin adapted the Jerry Spinelli novel, Stargirl, for Disney+ and produced the film alongside Gotham Entertainment. The Stargirl film follows the story of Leo (Graham Verchere) who becomes intrigued by a mysterious and quirky student named Stargirl (Grace VanderWaal), which Deadline described as "a teen movie marching to its own unique beat that probably would have brought a smile to John Hughes".

Hahn co-wrote DreamWorks Animation's Spirit Untamed, released in June 2021. The Los Angeles Times described it as "a sweet film with a moving message about embracing family, heritage and most importantly, yourself, just the way you are." With Forbes calling it a "colorful and nuanced character play".

From 2021 to 2022, Kristin served as the Kelley School of Business's Poling Chair of Business and Government at Indiana University.

== Filmography ==
Year	Title	Role	Notes
1988	Dear John	Production assistant	TV series (1 episode)
1993	Ed and His Dead Mother	Production assistant & Music supervisor	
1997	Anthem	Director, Camera Operator, Writer & Producer	Documentary; International Documentary Film Festival Amsterdam – Best First Appearance
2006	The Departed	Executive producer	
2009	The Time Traveler's Wife	Co-producer	
2010	The Switch	Executive producer	
2011	Five	Executive producer	TV movie
2013	Call Me Crazy: A Five Film	Executive producer	TV movie
2014	Cake	Producer	
2015	Tumbledown	Producer	
2017	The Yellow Birds	Executive producer	
2018	Dumplin'	Producer & writer	
2019–	The Morning Show	Executive producer	
2020	Stargirl	Producer & writer	
2021	Spirit Untamed	Co-writer	

== Bibliography ==
- Hahn, Kristin; Gabel, Shainee (August 1, 1997). Anthem : An American Road Story. William Morrow. ASIN 0380974193.
- Hahn, Kristin (March 26, 2002). In Search of Grace: A Religious Outsider's Journey Across America's Landscape of Faith. New York: HarperCollins. ISBN 0-380-97701-X. OCLC 877894909.
