= Jennifer Aniston Goes Viral =

Viral video advertisement

Jennifer Aniston Goes Viral, known also as Jen Aniston's Sex Tape, is a viral video advertisement by Glacéau, starring actress Jennifer Aniston, that promotes the Smartwater bottled water brand. The video was uploaded to YouTube on 7 March 2011 and had attracted almost ten and a half million views before it was taken down in February 2012.

== The video ==
The two-minute-and-43-second-long Alek Keshishian-directed video opens with teenage Internet personality Keenan Cahill lip-syncing to Far East Movement's "Like a G6", when Aniston enters the room and asks him whether he knows songs about water. The scene cuts away to Aniston introducing smartwater and explaining that she must make a video that "turns into a virus".

The video proceeds to parody a series of viral tropes, including animals (Golden Retriever puppies, a skateboarding dog and a talking parrot that says "Rachel, I love your hair"—a reference to Aniston's character Rachel Green on the television series Friends and the popular Rachel haircut), animated dirty-dancing babies, a double rainbow and a groin kick to a fan "that's worth about 100,000 hits". Then, in slow motion, Aniston swings her hair and drinks seductively from a bottle of smartwater, while "Baker Street" plays in the background.

The ad closes with Aniston's team of three "Internet boys" suggesting the name "Jen Aniston sex tape" for the video, to which she replies, "I love it!"

== Reception ==
Tom McKendrick, writing for Fairfax Media's Life & Style feature, described the video as "a viral video to kill all viral videos", with the name 'Jennifer Aniston sex tape' "enough to ensure its success". Console Digest characterized the project as combining a viral marketing campaign and "a pretty face" in a way that is "ironic" and "aware", and which demonstrates that "these days it doesn't matter what you're selling as long as the setting is amusing". WENN considered the advertisement to be "cleverly made" and reported, on 10 March 2011, that the video had "gone viral" and "taken the Internet by storm".

The video received mostly positive responses from YouTube users, and activity on the microblogging website Twitter made "Jennifer Aniston" a trending topic.

== Sequel ==
A sequel, The Jennifer Aniston Security Tapes: Secrets Revealed by smartwater, again directed by Keshishian, was uploaded to YouTube on 18 September 2012.
