= Golden Goblet Award for Best Screenplay =

Chinese film award

The Golden Globet Award for Best Screenplay (Chinese: 金爵奖最佳编剧) is a prize given to the films in the main category of competition at the Shanghai International Film Festival.

== Award winners ==
| Year | Film | Writer |
|---|---|---|
| 2002 | A Little Monk | (South Korea) Joo Kyung-jung |
| 2003 | no award this year | |
| 2004 | Brother | (Finland) Esa Illi |
| 2005 | Gimme Kudos | (China) Huang Jianxin, Yi Fan |
| 2006 | Love Belongs to Everyone | (Belgium) Hugo van Laere |
| 2007 | Aviva My Love | (Israel) Shemi Zarhin |
| 2008 | Václav | (Czech Republic) Marek Epstein |
| 2009 | We Can Do That | (Italy) Fabio Bonifacci, Giulio Manfredonia |
| 2010 | Kiss Me Again | (Italy) Gabriele Muccino |
| 2011 | Folk Songs Singning | (China) Zhang Ming |
| 2012 | Key of Life | (Japan) Kenji Uchida |
| 2013 | Förtroligheten | (Sweden) Angus MacLachlan |
| 2014 | Diplomatie | (France) (Germany) Volker Schlöndorff, Cyril Gely |
| 2015 | Cake | (United States) Daniel Barnz |
| 2016 | Hanna's Sleeping Dogs | (Austria) Andreas Gruber |
| 2017 | Kharms | (Russia) Ivan Bolotnikov |
| 2018 | Ala Changso | (China) Tashi Dawa, Sonthar Gyal |
| 2019 | Brotherhood | (Russia) Aleksander Lungin, Pavel Lungin |
