= People Magazine Awards =

2014 American pop culture awards

- Country: United States
- Presented by: Nick Cannon
- First award: December 18, 2014

Television/radio coverage
- Network: NBC

The People Magazine Awards is an American awards ceremony that aired on December 18, 2014 at 9 PM to 11 PM. The only ceremony was hosted by Nick Cannon. The ceremony was held at the Beverly Hilton Hotel in Beverly Hills, California.

Performers for the event included: Pharrell Williams with Gwen Stefani, 5 Seconds of Summer and Maroon 5. Jennifer Aniston, Kevin Hart, Kate Hudson, Michael Keaton and Jennifer Lopez made a special appearance during the show. The ceremony was aired on NBC and was produced by Dick Clark Productions with Allen Shapiro, Mike Mahan and Barry Edelman. Carol Donovan and Michael Dempsey were also executive producers for the event.

The People Magazine Awards allowed fans to vote via Twitter using the hashtag #PEOPLEMagazineAwards for the award of Best People Magazine Cover of the Year.

== Categories ==
- Movie Performance of the Year - Actor
- Movie Performance of the Year - Actress
- Comedy Star of the Year
- TV Performance of the Year - Actor
- TV Performance of the Year - Actress
- Talk Show Host of the Year
- People's Hero of the Year
- Next Generation Star
- Breakout Star of the Year
- Celebrity Role Model of the Year
- Style Icon of the Year
- People's Sexiest Woman
- TV Couple of the Year

== People Magazine Award ==
- Movie Performance of the Year - Actor : Michael Keaton
- Movie Performance of the Year - Actress : Jennifer Aniston
- Comedy Star of the Year : Kevin Hart
- TV Performance of the Year - Actor : Jon Hamm
- TV Performance of the Year - Actress : Lisa Kudrow
- Talk Show Host of the Year : Jimmy Fallon
- People's Hero of the Year : Nora Sandigo
- Next Generation Star : Chloë Grace Moretz
- Breakout Star of the Year : Billy Eichner
- Celebrity Role Model of the Year : Kate Hudson
- Style Icon of the Year : Gwen Stefani
- People's Sexiest Woman : Kate Upton
- TV Couple of the Year : Chris Messina & Mindy Kaling
- Triple Threat Award : Jennifer Lopez

== Ratings and Reception ==
The program was watched live by 3.67 million people and garnered a 0.8/3 rating to share ratio amongst the 18-49 age demographic.
