= Echo Films =

American production company

- Industry: Motion pictures, Entertainment
- Founded: 2008; 18 years ago
- Founder: Jennifer Aniston; Kristin Hahn
- Headquarters: United States
- Products: Films; TV films TV-series
- Owner: Jennifer Aniston (CEO); Kristin Hahn

Echo Films is an American production company founded in April 2008 by American actress Jennifer Aniston and her production partner Kristin Hahn. Echo Films has a production deal with Universal Pictures. The company produces projects for both film and television. Most of the projects star Jennifer Aniston.

== History ==
This is Jennifer Aniston's second production company. She previously founded Plan B Entertainment with Brad Pitt, Kristin Hahn and Brad Grey in 2002. In 2006, after Pitt and Aniston divorced, and Grey became the CEO of Paramount Pictures, Pitt became the sole owner of the company. Kristin Hahn also has another production company that she created in 2015 named Hahnscape Entertainment.

On the choice of the projects, Hahn said: "We particularly like working from books and real-life stories about distinct characters that embody something relatable and relevant about human nature's double-sided coin of vulnerability and mettle." On the name of the company, Aniston added that they were "drawn to stories about people finding their voice and finding their way because they help us as listeners and viewers do what we feel we're all trying to do, which is making sense of our lives through the stories of others. That's why we chose the name Echo, to echo back an idea, a challenge, something that resonates through all of us."

In 2024, Echo Films announced it would be producing a reimagined version of the 1980 classic 9 to 5 in collaboration with 20th Century Studios. Jennifer Aniston, co-founder of Echo Films, is serving as the producer. The project aims to modernize the original film's themes about workplace dynamics, addressing contemporary issues in the workforce.

== Films ==
Year	Title	Directors	Notes
2009	Management	Stephen Belber	
2010	The Switch	Will Speck and Josh Gordon	Walt Disney Studios Motion Pictures through their Miramax Films banner
2013	Life of Crime	Daniel Schechter	
2014	Cake	Daniel Barnz	
2017	The Yellow Birds	Alexandre Moors	
2018	Dumplin'	Anne Fletcher	Netflix
2023	Murder Mystery 2	Jeremy Garelick	Netflix

== Television ==
Year	Title	Director	Channel
2011	Five	Jennifer Aniston; Patty Jenkins; Alicia Keys; Demi Moore; Penelope Spheeris	Lifetime
2013	Call Me Crazy: A Five Film	Laura Dern; Bryce Dallas Howard; Bonnie Hunt; Ashley Judd; Sharon Maguire	Lifetime
2019–2025	The Morning Show	SEASON 1 Mimi Leder; David Frankel; Lynn Shelton; Tucker Gates; Roxann Dawson; Michelle MacLaren; Kevin Bray; SEASON 2 Mimi Leder; Lesli Linka Glatter; Jessica Yu; Tucker Gates; Rachel Morrison; Victoria Mahoney; Miguel Arteta; SEASON 3 Mimi Leder; Thomas Carter; Tucker Gates; Stacie Passon; Jennifer Getzinger; Millicent Shelton; SEASON 4 Mimi Leder	Apple TV+
