= Cake (2014 film) =

2014 film

- Theatrical release poster
- Directed by: Daniel Barnz
- Written by: Patrick Tobin
- Produced by: Ben Barnz; Kristin Hahn; Courtney Solomon; Mark Canton
- Starring: Jennifer Aniston; Adriana Barraza; Felicity Huffman; William H. Macy; Anna Kendrick; Sam Worthington
- Cinematography: Rachel Morrison
- Edited by: Kristina Boden
- Music by: Christophe Beck
- Production companies: Cinelou Films; Echo Films; We're Not Brothers Productions
- Distributed by: Cinelou Releasing; Freestyle Releasing
- Release dates: September 8, 2014 (TIFF); December 31, 2014 (United States)
- Running time: 102 minutes
- Country: United States
- Languages: English; Spanish
- Budget: $7–10 million
- Box office: $2.9 million

Cake is a 2014 American drama film directed by Daniel Barnz, written by Patrick Tobin, and starring Jennifer Aniston, Adriana Barraza, Felicity Huffman, William H. Macy, Anna Kendrick, and Sam Worthington. It debuted in the Special Presentations section of the 2014 Toronto International Film Festival.

Cake received mixed reviews and was a box-office bomb, grossing $2.9 million against its $7–10 million budget. However, Aniston's dramatic performance received positive reviews and earned her Best Actress nominations at the Golden Globe Awards and the Screen Actors Guild Awards.

== Plot ==
A year after surviving a car accident that killed her son, former attorney Claire Bennett struggles with chronic pain, making her angry. Silvana, her housekeeper, caretaker and chauffeur, looks after all of her needs.

Claire abuses pain medication to deal with her son's death and the suicide of Nina, a member of her chronic pain support group. With her marriage to Jason and life falling apart, she ends up buying drugs on the street to support her addiction. She also dreams vividly and hallucinates about Nina.

In physical therapy, Claire is uncooperative and risks her medication being cut off, as her condition has not improved. After her session, Claire jumps into the pool with body weights, seemingly to kill herself. She stays on the bottom for a long time before rising to the surface.

At the threat of a lawsuit, the support group leader, Annette, gives Claire Nina's home address. Claire goes to the house, and Nina's husband Roy, having been tipped off by Annette, confronts her as she is leaving. Bonding over their loss and isolation, Claire and Roy go to Nina's grave. A few nights later Claire surprises him at home but takes Nina's leftover Percocet. Claire's dreams of Nina continue.

The man responsible for Claire's car accident, Leonard, shows up at her house to apologize. She physically attacks him. Afterwards, she inadvertently overdoses on the pain medication. Taken to the hospital, she dreams of Nina presenting her with a birthday cake with six lit candles, explaining that she feels guilty about not being able to make a homemade birthday cake for her son.

Claire is discharged from the hospital and struggles to remain drug free. She asks Silvana to drive her to the drive-in where she had her first date with Jason. Wandering away, she lies down on the nearby railroad tracks and hallucinates a conversation with Nina, who gets Claire to admit she was a good mother. Claire hears Silvana calling her and when she gets up, Nina vanishes. Silvana loudly criticizes Claire for abusing everyone and pushing away Jason, who is also suffering the loss of their son. She is interrupted when Claire notices the car has been stolen, forcing them to stay in a motel.

The next day Becky, a girl on her way to Los Angeles, tries to steal Claire's purse. Claire brings her home to make her a homemade cake. Silvana later wakes Claire when she sees Becky has in fact stolen the purse, but has left a beautiful cake. Claire takes it to Roy for his son's birthday, as a way of thanking Nina. She and Silvana go to visit her son's grave, where Silvana hangs a wind chime in a nearby tree. On the ride home, Claire finally sits upright in the car.

== Cast ==
- Jennifer Aniston as Claire Bennett
- Adriana Barraza as Silvana
- Anna Kendrick as Nina Collins
- Sam Worthington as Roy Collins
- Mamie Gummer as Bonnie
- Felicity Huffman as Annette
- William H. Macy as Leonard
- Chris Messina as Jason Bennett
- Lucy Punch as Nurse Gayle
- Evan O'Toole as Casey Collins
- Britt Robertson as Becky
- Paula Cale as Carol
- Ashley Crow as Stephanie
- Manuel Garcia-Rulfo as Arturo
- Camille Guaty as Tina
- Allen Maldonado as Buddy
- Camille Mana as Nurse Salazar
- Julio Oscar Mechoso as Dr. Mata
- Pepe Serna as Nuncio
- Misty Upham as Liz
- Rose Abdoo as Innocencia
- Alma Martinez as Irma

== Production ==
On February 10, 2014, it was announced that Jennifer Aniston would play the lead in Cake. Daniel Barnz, the director, said "Of the zillions of Jennifer Aniston fans, I might be the biggest one of all. I've especially loved her more dramatic performances, and I can’t wait to watch her tackle a role that has such a brilliantly funny voice and so much raw pain (hats off to writer Patrick Tobin). I’m honored to be collaborating with Ben, Kristin and Courtney, and it’s exciting that Cake will be the first film under the Cinelou banner. It feels like we’re all taking a leap of faith together, and that’s pretty thrilling." On March 15, Mexican actress Adriana Barraza was also announced in the cast of the drama. The rest of the cast was revealed on April 1.

Principal photography, which took place in Los Angeles, began April 3, 2014 and ended mid-May.

== Release ==
Cake was released in select theatres on December 31, 2014 by Cinelou Films, before going on general release on January 23, 2015 by Freestyle Releasing. DVD & Blu-ray releases of the film were made available on April 21, 2015 by 20th Century Fox Home Entertainment.

== Reception ==
=== Critical response ===
On review aggregator website Rotten Tomatoes, the film holds an approval rating of 49% based on 125 reviews, with an average rating of 5.80/10. The site's critical consensus reads, "Cake finds Jennifer Aniston making the most of an overdue opportunity to test her dramatic chops, but it lacks sufficient depth or warmth to recommend for all but her most ardent fans." On Metacritic, the film has a score of 49 out of 100, based on reviews from 38 critics, indicating "mixed or average" reviews.

At the Toronto premiere, the cast received a standing ovation. The performances of Jennifer Aniston and Adriana Barraza have been highly praised by critics. Pete Hammond of Deadline described Aniston's performance as "heartbreakingly good... There are really no tricks to this performance. It's raw and real, poignant and unexpected." Clayton Davis of Awards Circuit spoke of Aniston's performance as "the single best performance by an actress this year... Aniston's performance is something that most actresses will pray to be able to achieve, but never come close." In his review for HitFix, Gregory Ellwood wrote that "Aniston makes you believe in Claire's pain. She makes you believe this character is at her lowest point and only she can pull herself out of it. There is no Oscar scene. There is no massive crying fit. It's a complete performance from beginning to end and she deserves the appropriate accolades for it." Of Aniston's performance, David Nusair of Reel Film Reviews wrote "...the actress steps into the shoes of her thoroughly damaged character to an often revelatory extent." Sheri Linden of the Los Angeles Times also spoke positively of Aniston's performance, writing "Aniston lends the role an impressively agonized physicality and brings ace timing to the screenplay's welcome gallows humor."

=== Accolades ===
Awards
Year	Award	Category	Recipient	Result
2013	Nantucket Film Festival	Showtime Tony Cox Screenplay Competition	Patrick Tobin	Won
2014	People Magazine Awards	Movie Performance of the Year – Actress	Jennifer Aniston	Won
2014	Capri Hollywood International Film Festival	Best Actress	Jennifer Aniston	Won
2015	Santa Barbara International Film Festival	The Montecito Award	Jennifer Aniston	Won
2015	Critics' Choice Movie Awards	Best Actress	Jennifer Aniston	Nominated
2015	Gold Derby Awards	Best Actress	Jennifer Aniston	Nominated
2015	Golden Globe Awards	Best Actress – Motion Picture Drama	Jennifer Aniston	Nominated
2015	Village Voice Film Poll	Best Actress	Jennifer Aniston	Nominated
2015	Golden Raspberry Award	Razzie Redeemer Award	Jennifer Aniston	Nominated
2015	Screen Actors Guild Awards	Outstanding Performance by a Female Actor in a Leading Role	Jennifer Aniston	Nominated
2015	Casting Society of America	Low-Budget Drama	Mary Vernieu, Lindsay Graham	Nominated
2015	PRISM Awards	Feature Film	Daniel Barnz	Nominated
2015	Golden Trailer Awards	Best Independent	Daniel Barnz	Nominated
2015	Shanghai International Film Festival	Golden Goblet Award for Best Feature Film	Daniel Barnz	Nominated
2015	Shanghai International Film Festival	Golden Goblet Award for Best Screenplay	Patrick Tobin	Won
2015	CineStory	Fellowship Award – Feature Screenplay	Patrick Tobin	Won
