= Five (2011 film) =

- Promotional poster
- Created by: Marta Kauffman
- Written by: Wendy West; Deirdre O'Connor; Jill Gordon; Stephen Godchaux; Howard Morris
- Directed by: Jennifer Aniston; Patty Jenkins; Alicia Keys; Demi Moore; Penelope Spheeris
- Starring: Patricia Clarkson; Rosario Dawson; Lyndsy Fonseca; Ginnifer Goodwin; Jeanne Tripplehorn
- Composer: Lorne Balfe
- Country of origin: United States
- Original language: English

Production
- Executive producers: Jennifer Aniston; Kristin Hahn; Kevin Chinoy; Francesca Silvestri; Marta Kauffman; Paula Wagner
- Producer: Nellie Nugiel
- Cinematography: Eric Alan Edwards; Guy Livneh; Jim Orr; Tami Reiker; Christopher Popp
- Editors: Zene Baker; Byron Smith; Tom Wilson
- Running time: 87 minutes
- Production companies: Echo Films; Freestyle Picture Company; More Horses Productions; Chestnut Ridge Productions; JWT New York; Sony Pictures Television

Original release
- Network: Lifetime
- Release: October 10, 2011

Related
- Call Me Crazy: A Five Film

Five is a 2011 American comedy-drama anthology television film which premiered on Lifetime on October 10, 2011. The film drew 1.3 million viewers to its premiere. A sequel, Call Me Crazy: A Five Film, was released in 2013.

== Plot ==
An anthology of five short films exploring the impact of breast cancer on people's lives.

== Cast and crew ==
=== Segment Mia ===
- Patricia Clarkson as Mia Newells
- Tony Shalhoub as Mitch Taylor
- Kathy Najimy as Rocky
- Romy Rosemont as Lynne
- Andrea Bendewald as Kate

Directed by Jennifer Aniston, written by Wendy West

=== Segment Pearl ===
- Jeanne Tripplehorn as Dr. Pearl Jarente
- Bob Newhart as Dr. Roth
- Alan Ruck as Sam Jarente
- Jeffrey Tambor as Danny Dinlear
- Scott Wilson as old Bill
- Talyan Wright as Charlotte age 6 / Sophia Beliaev as Charlotte age 11

Directed by Patty Jenkins, written by Deirdre O'Connor

=== Segment Lili ===
- Rosario Dawson as Lili
- Jenifer Lewis as Maggie
- Tracee Ellis Ross as Alyssa

Directed by Alicia Keys, written by Jill Gordon

=== Segment Charlotte ===
- Ginnifer Goodwin as Charlotte
- Ava Acres as young Pearl
- Josh Holloway as Bill
- Carla Gallo as Laura
- Aisha Hinds as Bernice
- Jennifer Morrison as Sheila
- Austin Nichols as Edward
- Annie Potts as Helen (Charlotte's Mom)
- Casey Simpson as Buddy
- Emily Skinner as Sally

Directed by Demi Moore, written by Stephen Godchaux

=== Segment Cheyanne ===
- Lyndsy Fonseca as Cheyanne
- Taylor Kinney as Tommy

Directed by Penelope Spheeris, written by Howard Morris

== Awards and nominations ==
Year	Award	Category	Recipient(s)	Result
2012	Awards Circuit Community Awards	Best Supporting Actor (TV Movie or Mini-Series)	Bob Newhart	Nominated
2012	Primetime Emmy Award	Outstanding Casting for a Miniseries, Movie, or Special	Randi Hiller; Tamara Notcutt	Nominated
2012	Casting Society of America	Outstanding Achievement in Casting – Television Movie or Mini Series	Randi Hiller; Tamara Notcutt	Nominated
2012	Black Reel Awards	Best Actress: T.V. Movie/Cable	Rosario Dawson	Nominated
2012	Black Reel Awards	Best Actress: T.V. Movie/Cable	Tracee Ellis Ross	Nominated
2012	Black Reel Awards	Best Actress: T.V. Movie/Cable	Jenifer Lewis	Nominated
2012	Black Reel Awards	Outstanding Television or Mini-Series Film	Nellie Nugiel	Nominated
2012	Critics' Choice Television Award	Best Actress in a Movie/Miniseries	Patricia Clarkson	Nominated
2012	Directors Guild of America Award	Outstanding Directing – Television Film	Jennifer Aniston; Patty Jenkins; Alicia Keys; Demi Moore; Penelope Spheeris	Nominated
2012	Gracie Award	Outstanding Drama	Jennifer Aniston; Patty Jenkins; Alicia Keys; Demi Moore; Penelope Spheeris	Won
2012	NAACP Image Award	Outstanding Television Movie, Mini-Series or Dramatic Special		Nominated
2012	NAACP Image Award	Outstanding Actress in a Television Movie, Mini-Series or Dramatic Special	Jenifer Lewis	Nominated
2012	NAACP Image Award	Outstanding Actress in a Television Movie, Mini-Series or Dramatic Special	Rosario Dawson	Nominated
2012	NAACP Image Award	Outstanding Actress in a Television Movie, Mini-Series or Dramatic Special	Tracee Ellis Ross	Nominated
2012	Imagen Awards	Best Primetime Program: Special or Movie-of-the-Week		Nominated
2012	Imagen Awards	Best Actress/Television	Rosario Dawson	Nominated
2012	NAMIC Vision Award	Best Performance – Drama	Jenifer Lewis	Nominated
2012	NAMIC Vision Award	Best Performance – Drama	Rosario Dawson	Nominated
2012	Online Film & Television Association	Best Ensemble in a Motion Picture or Miniseries		Nominated
2012	Online Film & Television Association	Best Actress in a Motion Picture or Miniseries	Patricia Clarkson	Nominated
2012	Online Film & Television Association	Best Supporting Actress in a Motion Picture or Miniseries	Jenifer Lewis	Nominated
2012	Women's Image Network Awards	Outstanding Show Produced By A Woman	Jennifer Aniston; Paula Wagner; Marta Kauffman; Kristin Hahn; Nellie Nugiel; Francesca Silvestri	Won
2012	Women's Image Network Awards	Best Actress in a Made for Television Movie	Patricia Clarkson	Nominated
2012	Women's Image Network Awards	Best Actress in a Made for Television Movie	Jeanne Tripplehorn	Nominated
2012	Writers Guild of America Award	Long Form – Original	Deirdre O'Connor	Nominated
2012	Writers Guild of America Award	Long Form – Original	Stephen Godchaux	Nominated
2012	Writers Guild of America Award	Long Form – Original	Howard Morris	Nominated
2012	Writers Guild of America Award	Long Form – Original	Jill Gordon	Nominated
2012	Writers Guild of America Award	Long Form – Original	Wendy West	Nominated
