= Room 10 =

- Directed by: Jennifer Aniston; Andrea Buchanan
- Screenplay by: Andrea Buchanan
- Produced by: Kevin Chinoy; Francesca Silvestri
- Starring: Robin Wright
- Cinematography: James Glennon
- Edited by: Trish Fuller
- Music by: Scott Hardkiss
- Release date: October 16, 2006
- Running time: 18 minutes
- Country: United States
- Language: English

Room 10 is a 2006 short film co-directed by Jennifer Aniston and Andrea Buchanan and starring Robin Wright.

== Plot ==
During one of her shifts in the emergency department of a hospital, Frannie Jones (Wright), an overworked nurse, meets a couple in Room 10 where the woman is close to death.

== Cast ==
- Robin Wright as Frannie Jones
- Kris Kristofferson as Howard Davis
- Leonardo Nam as Shane Woo
- Brooke D'Orsay as Jessica Mills
- Gwen McGee as Kelly Jackson
- Bonita Friedericy as Psych Patient
- Patricia Place as June Davis

== Reviews ==
Indiewire's Daniel Walber wrote, "Room 10 is a great example of the constrained and creative art of the short film."

== Accolades ==
Year	Award	Category	Recipient	Result
2007	CineVegas	Best Short Film	Jennifer Aniston; Andrea Buchanan	Won
