= The Bounty Hunter (2010 film) =

- Theatrical release poster
- Directed by: Andy Tennant
- Written by: Sarah Thorp
- Produced by: Neal H. Moritz
- Starring: Jennifer Aniston; Gerard Butler; Christine Baranski
- Cinematography: Oliver Bokelberg
- Edited by: Troy Takaki
- Music by: George Fenton
- Production companies: Columbia Pictures; Relativity Media; Original Film
- Distributed by: Sony Pictures Releasing
- Release date: March 19, 2010
- Running time: 106 minutes
- Country: United States
- Language: English
- Budget: $40–45 million
- Box office: $136.3 million

The Bounty Hunter is a 2010 American romantic action comedy directed by Andy Tennant, starring Jennifer Aniston and Gerard Butler. The story centers on a bounty hunter hired to retrieve his ex-wife, who has skipped bail. The film was released in the United States on March 19, 2010. The film received negative reviews from critics but was a box office success, grossing $136.3 million against a production budget of $40–45 million.

== Plot ==
Milo Boyd, a former New York Police Department detective is now a bounty hunter. His ex-wife, Nicole Hurley, is an investigative reporter who was recently arrested for assaulting a police officer.

Nicole receives a tip on a story, an apparent suicide that may have been a murder, so she skips her bond hearing to meet her informant, causing the judge to revoke her bail and issue a warrant for her arrest. Just before Nicole arrives, her informant, Jimmy, is kidnapped.

Milo is ecstatic when Nicole's bail bondsman, Sid, offers him the job of bringing her to jail for a bounty of $5,000. Nicole's mother Kitty inadvertently helps him find her at a race track in New Jersey. Capturing Nicole, he throws her into his trunk and drives back towards Manhattan. Nicole escapes briefly before he re-captures her.

They are being stalked: Milo by two thugs sent by his bookie Irene, because of his gambling debts, and Nicole by corrupt cop Earl Mahler, who is connected with the story she is investigating, and both by Nicole's lovestruck coworker Stewart, bent on rescuing her from Milo. Irene's thugs confuse Stewart for Milo and mistakenly kidnap him.

As Milo drives along, Earl pulls alongside and tries to shoot Nicole, but he misses, and then Earl crashes. He gets away by hijacking a passing car. Milo is not interested in Nicole's explanations until she tells him she's found evidence that implicates Bobby, their mutual friend, and Milo's ex-partner on the force, indicating that he is involved with Earl. Milo decides to investigate with her.

Clues from Earl's car lead them to a country club, where they learn from a caddie that Earl owns a tattoo parlor in Queens, so they start to make their way there. A call from Bobby warns them to get off the road and lie low.

The nearest hotel turns out to be the bed and breakfast where they had spent their honeymoon and they are given the same room. Spending time together, they discover they still have feelings for each other and both admit making mistakes. Later, coming out of the bathroom, Nicole overhears Milo telling Sid he may sleep with her, but he's still taking her to jail. When he's asleep, she handcuffs him to the bed and takes his car to go to the tattoo parlor. Milo steals a car to follow her. At the parlor, Nicole finds Jimmy and frees him before they are captured by Irene's thugs.

They take Nicole with them when they visit a strip club, and Milo rescues her by causing a distraction. Then they hear Bobby is heading to the police department's evidence warehouse, which is being relocated to a new building. There, Bobby confronts Earl, a former friend who has used Bobby's name to gain access to the warehouse and steal a large amount of narcotics and cash, and tries to arrest him, but Earl shoots him. When Milo and Nicole enter the warehouse, Milo is ambushed by Earl, but Milo jumps Earl when Nicole threatens him from behind with a shotgun she has found amongst the evidence.

Bobby, who has survived the shooting, explains that Earl was using him, as well as the man who supposedly committed suicide, to gain access to the warehouse. There was no proof, so Bobby was waiting for Earl to make his move before arresting him. Milo emphasizes that Earl might have gotten away with it if Nicole hadn't picked up clues. He and Nicole appear to have reconciled, although they agree that sometimes their jobs have to come first. Nicole is shocked when Milo insists on still turning her into the police so he can collect the reward.

On his way out of the precinct, Milo runs into a cop who insulted him earlier and punches him in the face. He is arrested and put in the cell adjoining Nicole's. He reminds her that it is their anniversary and now they have to spend it together. Through the bars separating them, they admit their love and embrace and kiss.

== Cast ==
- Jennifer Aniston as Nicole Hurley (previously Boyd), a Daily News reporter, and Milo's ex-wife.
- Gerard Butler as Milo Boyd, a bounty hunter, former police officer, and Nicole's ex-husband.
- Jason Sudeikis as Stewart, Nicole's co-worker who has unrequited feelings for her.
- Jeff Garlin as Sid, Milo's friend, and employer as a bail bondsman.
- Cathy Moriarty as Irene, a gift shop owner, and local bookmaker.
- Ritchie Coster as Ray, one of Irene's employees.
- Joel Marsh Garland as Dwight, one of Irene's employees.
- Siobhan Fallon Hogan as Teresa, the secretary of Sid's business.
- Peter Greene as Earl Mahler, a corrupt cop.
- Dorian Missick as Bobby Jenkins, NYPD detective and Milo's best friend.
- Carol Kane as Dawn, a co-owner of a bed and breakfast.
- Adam LeFevre as Edmund, a co-owner of a bed and breakfast.
- Adam Rose as Jimmy, a bartender.
- Christine Baranski as Kitty Hurley, Nicole's mother.
- Matt Malloy as Gary, a co-worker of Nicole's.
- Christian Borle as Caddie.

== Production ==
In May 2007, it was announced Columbia acquired the then untitled bounty hunter pitch for Development with Original Film.

== Release ==
=== Box office ===
The Bounty Hunter was released alongside Repo Men and Diary of a Wimpy Kid. It grossed $20.7 million in its opening weekend. As of July 5, 2010, it has grossed $67,061,228 in North America and $69,031,265 internationally for a worldwide total of $136,333,522.

=== Critical response ===
On review aggregator website Rotten Tomatoes, The Bounty Hunter has an approval rating of 13%, based on 151 reviews, and an average rating of 3.60/10. The site's critical consensus reads, "Gerard Butler and Jennifer Aniston remain as attractive as ever, but The Bounty Hunter's formula script doesn't know what to do with them – or the audience's attention." On Metacritic, the film has a score of 22 out of 100, based on 31 critics, indicating "generally unfavorable reviews". Audiences polled by CinemaScore gave the film an average grade of "B−" on an A+ to F scale.

Roger Ebert gave the film one-and-a-half stars out of four, commenting that "neither [Aniston nor Butler] is allowed to speak more than efficient sentences to advance the plot" and that it is rife with "exhausted action clichés." A.O. Scott of The New York Times gave the film a completely negative review and said it was rated PG-13 for "witless sexual innuendo and witless violence." Kerry Lengel of The Arizona Republic gave the film three and a half stars out of five: "As formula films go, The Bounty Hunter is more enjoyable than most, even if it packs in as many clichés as any." However, Lengel did praise Aniston's and Butler's performances but was critical of the "improbable" plot.

=== Accolades ===
Association	Category	Nominee	Results
Alliance of Women Film Journalists awards	Actress Most in Need of a New Agent	Jennifer Aniston	Won
31st Golden Raspberry Awards	Worst Picture	—N/a	Nominated
31st Golden Raspberry Awards	Worst Actress	Jennifer Aniston	Nominated
31st Golden Raspberry Awards	Worst Actor	Gerard Butler	Nominated
31st Golden Raspberry Awards	Worst Screen Couple	Jennifer Aniston; Gerard Butler	Nominated
Teen Choice Awards	Choice Movie Actor - Romantic Comedy	Gerard Butler	Nominated

=== Home media ===
The Bounty Hunter was released on DVD and Blu-ray Disc on July 13, 2010. The only extra material is three featurettes ("Making The Bounty Hunter", "Rules for Outwitting a Bounty Hunter", and "Stops Along the Road: Hunting Locations"). The film grossed $23,310,266 from DVD sales in North America.
