= The Break-Up =

- Theatrical release poster
- Directed by: Peyton Reed
- Screenplay by: Jeremy Garelick; Jay Lavender
- Story by: Vince Vaughn; Jeremy Garelick; Jay Lavender
- Produced by: Vince Vaughn; Scott Stuber
- Starring: Vince Vaughn; Jennifer Aniston; Joey Lauren Adams; Ann-Margret; Judy Davis; Vincent D'Onofrio; Jon Favreau; Cole Hauser; John Michael Higgins; Justin Long
- Cinematography: Eric Alan Edwards
- Edited by: Dan Lebental; David Rosenbloom
- Music by: Jon Brion
- Production company: Wild West Picture Show Productions
- Distributed by: Universal Pictures
- Release date: June 2, 2006
- Running time: 106 minutes
- Country: United States
- Language: English
- Budget: $52 million
- Box office: $205.7 million

The Break-Up is a 2006 American romantic comedy-drama film directed by Peyton Reed, and starring Vince Vaughn and Jennifer Aniston. It was written by Jay Lavender and Jeremy Garelick from a story by them and Vaughn, and produced by Vaughn and Scott Stuber.

The plot follows Gary and Brooke who, after meeting at a Cubs game, soon become a couple who buy a condo together, then have a breakup which is worsened when both refuse to move out.

The film was released by Universal Pictures on June 2, 2006 and received mixed reviews from critics while grossing $205.7 million against a $52 million budget.

== Plot ==
Gary Grobowski and Brooke Meyers meet at Wrigley Field during a Chicago Cubs game and begin dating, eventually buying a condominium together. Gary works as a tour guide in a family business with his brothers, Lupus and Dennis. Brooke manages an art gallery owned by eccentric artist Marilyn Dean.

Their relationship comes to a head after the latest in an escalating series of arguments. Brooke, feeling unappreciated, criticizes Gary's perceived immaturity and unwillingness to work on improving their relationship. Gary is frustrated by Brooke's perceived controlling, perfectionistic attitude, and expresses his desire to have a little more independence, particularly when arriving home from work, wanting to unwind.

Brooke becomes irritated when Gary fails to offer to help her clean up after a big dinner party at their home. Still frustrated from their unresolved earlier argument and feeling unappreciated, she breaks up with him (despite still being in love with him). Brooke seeks relationship advice from her friend Addie, while Gary talks things over with his friend Johnny.

Since neither is willing to move out of their condo, they compromise by living as roommates; but each begins acting out to provoke the other in increasingly elaborate ways. Gary buys a pool table, litters the condo with food and trash, and even has a strip poker party with Lupus and a few women. Meanwhile, Brooke has Gary kicked off their "couples-only" bowling team and starts dating other men, attempting to make Gary jealous.

When their friend and realtor Mark sells the condo, Gary and Brooke are given two weeks' notice to move out. Brooke invites Gary to an Old 97's concert, hoping he will figure out that the gesture is meant to be her last-ditch attempt to salvage their relationship. Gary agrees to meet her but fails to understand Brooke's intentions and misses the concert—unwittingly breaking Brooke's heart.

They fight one final time. Brooke says that Gary never matched her level of effort, and he retorts that she was never clear about what she wanted. Later, Johnny points out that Gary has been selfish and emotionally distant from Brooke, dooming their relationship.

Brooke quits her job to travel in Europe. One evening, she brings a customer from the art gallery home. She finds the condo cleaned and Gary preparing a fancy dinner to win her back. He lays his heart on the line and promises to appreciate her more. For Brooke, it is too little too late, and she rejects the gesture. Gary seems to understand and kisses her before leaving.

Both move out of the condo. Gary takes a more active role in his business, while Brooke travels the world, eventually returning to Chicago. Sometime later, they meet again by chance on the street. After some awkward but friendly catching up, they part ways but look back to smile at each other.

== Cast ==
- Vince Vaughn as Gary Grobowski
- Jennifer Aniston as Brooke Meyers
- Joey Lauren Adams as Addie Jones, Brooke's best friend.
- Ann-Margret as Wendy Meyers, Brooke's mother.
- Jason Bateman as Mark Riggleman, a realtor and friend of the couple.
- Judy Davis as Marilyn Dean, an artist, gallery owner, and Brooke's boss.
- Vincent D'Onofrio as Dennis Grobowski, Gary's brother and boss.
- Jon Favreau as John "Johnny O" Ostrofski, a bartender and Gary's best friend.
- Cole Hauser as Lupus Grobowski, Gary's other brother and co-worker.
- John Michael Higgins as Richard Meyers, Brooke's brother.
- Justin Long as Christopher Hirons, a receptionist at Marilyn Dean's gallery.
- Ivan Sergei as Carson Wigham, a client of the gallery who shows interest in Brooke.
- Keir O'Donnell as Paul Grant, a friend of Andrew's and Brooke's date.
- Geoff Stults as Mike Lawrence, another of Brooke's dates.
- Vernon Vaughn as Howard Meyers, Brooke's father.
- Peter Billingsley as Andrew Jones, Addie's husband.
- Mary-Pat Green as Mischa, Marilyn Dean's personal waxer.
- Linda Cohn as ESPN Sportscaster (voice)
- Zack Shada as Mad Dawg Killa (voice)

== Production ==
Vince Vaughn and Jennifer Aniston began a relationship while filming The Break-Up, the same year she filed for divorce from Brad Pitt. In December 2006 they ended the relationship, Vaughn citing difficulties with paparazzi and media attention.

== Soundtrack ==
The Break-Up

Soundtrack album by Jon Brion
- Released: October 3, 2006
- Genre: Score • Various
- Length: 41:43
- Label: Lakeshore Records

Jon Brion chronology
I Heart Huckabees (2004)	The Break-Up (2006)	Synecdoche, New York (2008)

All tracks are written by Jon Brion except where noted.

No.	Title	Length
1.	"Crazy Little Thing Called Love" (by Dwight Yoakam)	2:21
2.	"Who Loves You Baby" (by Telly Savalas)	3:26
3.	"Story of My Life" (by Social Distortion)	4:53
4.	"The Break-Up (Theme)"	3:06
5.	"Timebomb" (by Old 97's)	3:09
6.	"Boogie Nights" (by John Michael Higgins & His Symphony of Guys)	2:20
7.	"Ay Cosita Linda" (by Perez Prado)	2:25
8.	"26" (by Shawn Lee)	2:07
9.	"It's Only a Paper Moon" (by Ella Fitzgerald)	3:34
10.	"Mirror"	0:23
11.	"Time" (Rich Jacques)	4:10
12.	"La Vem a Baiana" (Jussara Silveira)	4:02
13.	"I Can See Clearly Now" (Johnny Nash)	2:46
14.	"Rainbow Connection" (by John Michael Higgins & His Symphony of Guys)	3:01
Total length:		41:43

== Reception ==
=== Box office ===
The film grossed over $205 million worldwide, with a total of $118.7 million at the American box office.

=== Critical response ===
On Rotten Tomatoes the film has an approval rating of 34% based on 192 reviews with an average rating of 5/10. The site's critical consensus reads, "This anti-romantic comedy lacks both laughs and insight, resulting in an odd and unsatisfying experience." On Metacritic, the film has a score of 45 out of 100 based on 37 critics, indicating "mixed or average reviews". Audiences polled by CinemaScore gave the film an average grade of "C+" on an A+ to F scale.

Film critic Rick Groen of The Globe and Mail wrote, "Although possessed of a laudable desire not to be yet another run-of-the-mill, wacky-impediment—damned if the picture can figure out how to be an anti-romance comedy."

=== Awards and nominations ===
Association	Category	Recipient	Results
ASCAP Film and Television Music award	Top Box Office Films	Jon Brion; John O'Brien	Won
People's Choice Award	Favorite Female Movie Star	Jennifer Aniston	Won
People's Choice Award	Favorite On-Screen Match-Up	Jennifer Aniston; Vince Vaughn	Nominated
Teen Choice Award	Choice Movie - Comedy	—N/a	Nominated
Teen Choice Award	Choice Movie Actor - Comedy	Vince Vaughn	Nominated
Teen Choice Award	Choice Movie Actress - Comedy	Jennifer Aniston	Nominated
Teen Choice Award	Choice Movie - Chemistry	Jennifer Aniston; Vince Vaughn	Won
Teen Choice Award	Choice Movie - Breakout Male	Justin Long	Nominated

== Home media ==
The film was released on DVD on October 17, 2006. It grossed $51 million in the US from DVD/home video rentals. It was later released on Blu-ray on June 3, 2014, and again on October 16, 2018.

A double-feature Blu-ray was released by Mill Creek Entertainment on October 5, 2021. The release contains the film and The Dilemma, which Vince Vaughn also starred in.
