= The Yellow Birds (film) =

- Film poster
- Directed by: Alexandre Moors
- Written by: David Lowery; R.F.I. Porto
- Based on: The Yellow Birds by Kevin Powers
- Produced by: Mark Canton; Courtney Solomon; Jeffrey Sharp
- Starring: Tye Sheridan; Alden Ehrenreich; Toni Collette; Jason Patric; Jack Huston; Jennifer Aniston
- Cinematography: Daniel Landin
- Edited by: Joe Klotz
- Music by: Adam Wiltzie
- Production companies: Cinelou Films; Echo Films; Story Mining & Supply Co.
- Distributed by: Saban Films; DirecTV Cinema
- Release dates: January 21, 2017 (Sundance); June 15, 2018 (United States)
- Running time: 95 minutes
- Countries: United States; Morocco
- Languages: English; French; Arabic
- Budget: $12 million
- Box office: $57,946

The Yellow Birds is a 2017 American war film directed by Alexandre Moors and based on the novel The Yellow Birds by Kevin Powers. The film stars Tye Sheridan, Alden Ehrenreich, Toni Collette, Jason Patric, Jack Huston, and Jennifer Aniston.

The story is about two young U.S. soldiers who navigate the terrors of the Iraq War. When only one of the soldiers returns home, he is tortured by a promise he made to the other's mother before their deployment. The film had its world premiere at the Sundance Film Festival on January 21, 2017. It was released on May 17, 2018, through DirecTV Cinema before being released in a limited release and through video on demand on June 15, 2018, by Saban Films.

== Plot ==
The story alternates between flashbacks of U.S. soldier Brandon Bartle's time serving in Iraq with his friend Daniel "Murph" Murphy, and Bartle's return home to Richmond, Virginia. Bartle befriends Murph, a fellow Virginian, during basic training. Murph is a middle-class kid who wants to attend the University of Virginia after his service, Bartle is from a working-class background with no idea what he wants to do with his life. At a party before the men deploy to Iraq, Murph’s mom Maureen makes Bartle promise that if anything happens to her son, he’ll bring her the news personally.

In Iraq, the two soldiers are placed under the command of the older, troubled Sergeant Sterling. Murph is gradually broken down by the horrors of the experience. During a convalescence following an injury, Murph is treated by a female medic named Jenny whom he develops an attraction to but lacks the courage to approach. Murph observes Jenny arrive at her post visibly distraught but the area is suddenly hit by bombs and Murph finds Jenny fatally wounded. He and Bartle lift Jenny onto a makeshift stretcher and carry her in search of a medic.

In the present, Bartle suffers from PTSD and a combative relationship with his mother Amy. After a fight with his mom, he wanders aimlessly until spotting a young couple kissing in the woods. He wades toward them through a deep river until he's submerged and nearly drowns and the couple calls the police. When Maureen arrives at Bartle's home in hopes of discovering what happened to her son, Amy invites her in. After being released by the police, Bartle is apprehended by CID officer Captain Anderson who is investigating Murph’s disappearance and reveals that Sterling has committed suicide.

Bartle, back in prison, calls Amy to apologize. Maureen visits and asks for the truth about what happened to her son. Bartle tells her about a sweep of an Iraqi village in which Murph wandered away from the unit and disappeared. Bartle and Sterling, led to a minaret by an elderly hermit, find his body dumped behind a bush, naked and nearly castrated. Believing Maureen wouldn't want to see her son’s desecrated body, they dispose of the corpse in a river. As he releases him into the water, Bartle remarks that Murph always wanted to disappear and this is the way he would have wanted to go. Sterling insists it must be kept a secret, and murders the hermit.

Maureen tearfully asks Bartle if there were any moments when her son was happy. Bartle describes a holiday party on base where Murph wanted to dance with Jenny but was too nervous to ask her.

Jenny notices Murphy and approaches him with a request. He accepts, and the two are locked in a slow dance together.

== Cast ==
- Alden Ehrenreich as John Bartle
- Tye Sheridan as Daniel Murphy
- Jack Huston as Sergeant Sterling
- Jennifer Aniston as Maureen Murphy
- Toni Collette as Amy Bartle
- Jason Patric as Captain Anderson
- Carrie Wampler as Jenny Smith
- Lee Tergesen as Jim Murphy
- Olivia Crocicchia as Tess
- Gershwyn Eustache Jnr as the Lieutenant
- Daniel Jose Molina as Yasquez
- Mikey Collins as Whitaker
- Carter Redwood as Crockett
- Ray Fearon as the Colonel
- Tom Bates as the embedded Journalist
- Renée Willett as Claire
- Douglas McFerran as the airport bartender
- Gwydion Lashlee-Walton as the clerk
- T. R. Boyce, Jr. as the chaplain
- Colton Medlin as Luke
- Lebrandon Shead as the prison guard
- Henry Leroy-Salta as Dentler
- Khadija Hatimi as the old woman
- Ahmed Izm as the hermit

== Production ==
David Lowery first adapted the book into a screenplay and was originally tapped to direct, but had to drop out because of a scheduling conflict with Pete's Dragon. Once Alexandre Moors replaced Lowery as director, Moors' Blue Caprice screenwriter R.F.I. Porto was brought on to revise the script. Benedict Cumberbatch and Will Poulter were originally cast but they dropped out after the project was delayed and were replaced by Jack Huston and Alden Ehrenreich, respectively. Jennifer Aniston served as an executive producer. The title song was written by John Mellencamp.

Principal photography on the film began in October 2015 in Morocco, and it wrapped on January 29, 2016.

== Release ==
The film had its world premiere at the Sundance Film Festival on January 21, 2017. Shortly after, Saban Films and DirecTV Cinema acquired U.S. distribution rights to the film. It was released on May 17, 2018, through DirecTV Cinema before being released in a limited release and through video on demand on June 15, 2018.

== Reception ==
On review aggregator Rotten Tomatoes, the film holds an approval rating of 44% based on 41 reviews, with a weighted average rating of 5.3/10. The website's critical consensus reads, "The Yellow Birds has a strong cast and a worthy message, but they're both lost in this war drama's rote, clichéd story." On Metacritic, the film has a weighted average score of 56 out of 100, based on 15 critics, indicating "mixed or average reviews".

Jeannette Catsoulis of The New York Times wrote the film is "a thoughtful, melancholy drama whose performances and photography are so strong that we keep waiting for the story to catch up. Watch it once, and you could come away a little underwhelmed; watch it twice, and you begin to suspect that its almost humdrum rhythms are exactly the point."

The performances of Ehrenreich and Sheridan were praised. Michael Rechtshaffen of the Los Angeles Times wrote, "Making a late appearance in the Iraq War movie cycle, the impressively acted 'The Yellow Birds' manages to leave an affecting mark even as it constantly struggles to find a distinctive voice of its own." Rechtshaffen also commended Aniston and Collette for their "uniformly naturalistic performances."

Writing for RogerEbert.com, Brian Tallerico criticized the film for borrowing elements from other war films like The Hurt Locker and Full Metal Jacket, but praised Daniel Landin's cinematography and Ehrenreich's acting.

== Accolades ==
Year	Award	Category	Recipient	Result
2017	2017 Sundance Film Festival	U.S. Dramatic Special Jury Award for Cinematography	Daniel Landin	Won
2017	2017 Sundance Film Festival	Grand Jury Prize: Dramatic	Alexandre Moors	Nominated
2017	2017 Edinburgh International Film Festival	Audience Award	Alexandre Moors	Nominated
2017	2017 Hamptons International Film Festival	Special presentations	None	Not competing
2017	2017 Deauville American Film Festival	"Les Premières"	Alexandre Moors	Not competing
