= Stargirl =

Stargirl or Star Girl may refer to:

- Stargirl (novel), a 2000 young adult novel by Jerry Spinelli
  - Stargirl (film), a 2020 film based on the Spinelli novel
- Courtney Whitmore, the DC Comics superhero Stargirl created by Geoff Johns and Lee Moder, who appeared in various media besides comics
  - Stargirl (TV series), a 2020 American superhero drama streaming television series based on the comic character
- Star Girls, a manhua comics magazine
- Star Girl, a game made by Animoca Brands

== Music ==
- "Star Girl" (song), a song by McFly
- The Star Girls, an Australian pop band
- StarGirl Records, a record label; see List of 2021 albums (July–December)
- Stargirl Interlude, a song by The Weeknd and Lana Del Rey

== See also ==
- Love, Stargirl, the 2007 sequel to the novel
- Hollywood Stargirl, the 2022 sequel to the film
- Starboy (disambiguation)
- Starman (disambiguation)
