= The Whale (soundtrack) =

The Whale (Original Score)

Film score by Rob Simonsen
- Released: December 9, 2022
- Studio: AIR Studios, London
- Genre: Film score
- Length: 36:39
- Label: A24 Music
- Producer: Rob Simonsen

Rob Simonsen chronology
Hollywood Stargirl (2022)	The Whale (Original Score) (2022)	Good Grief (2023)

Singles from The Whale (Original Score)
- 1. "Midnight Storm" Released: November 28, 2022

The Whale (Original Score) is the film score soundtrack to the 2022 film The Whale directed by Darren Aronofsky. The soundtrack featured 14 tracks composed by Rob Simonsen and was released through A24 Music on December 9, 2022, the same day as the film.

An arrangement of the score was used in the winning ice dance program at both the 2026 Winter Olympics and the 2026 World Figure Skating Championships.

== Development ==
In January 2022, it was announced that Rob Simonsen would compose the film score for The Whale, collaborating with Aronofsky for the first time. The Whale is Aronofsky's first film without the involvement of composer Clint Mansell who had scored all of his films. (Note: Aronofsky earlier replaced Mansell with Jóhann Jóhannsson for Mother! (2017) before he ultimately decided to use no music in the final edit.) Simonsen recalled that Jason Reitman, his frequent collaborator, had written a letter about him to Aronofsky and the following day, the latter invited him to a Zoom call describing the story of the film. He saw the final edit and was moved by it, eventually agreeing to work on the film.

Simonsen admitted that "The Whale was an opportunity to paint a pretty bold canvas, but also to feature quiet moments to make the intensity really stand out." While watching the rough edit of the film without temp music, Simonsen came up with the idea of using an overtone flute with "an ethereal, otherworldly, hollow, but also very large sound" to echo the nautical elements present in the film and create the feel of a "man lost at sea, on the sea of their own emotions." Simonsen listened to sea shanties and Mormon songs and chants to deepen the nautical texture.

The score used more classical orchestrations than some of his previous work, with string and brass being predominant. The work was influenced by Henryk Górecki, Ralph Vaughan Williams and Samuel Barber. The orchestra he worked with, the London Contemporary Orchestra, included 25 people on strings and brass. The soundtrack was recorded at the AIR Studios.

Besides the use of strings and brass, Simonsen played a 19th-century pump organ, blending it with the overtone flute, to produce a droning sound. The flute used for the recording, designed by Winne Clement, was 21 feet long.

== Release ==
On November 28, 2022, A24 Music released the first track from the film: "Midnight Storm" on all digital music platforms. The soundtrack was released digitally on December 9, 2022, the same day as the film.

== Reception ==
The reviews were largely negative. A. O. Scott of The New York Times panned the film as "overwrought", referring to the score as "strenuous nerve pumping". David Rooney of The Hollywood Reporter described it as "emotionally emphatic overkill", while David Fear of Rolling Stone grumbled that the "doom-laden score [...] keeps rubbing the despair even deeper into your face". El Hunt of NME concluded that the soundtrack "borders on ridiculous."

== Track listing ==
No.	Title	Length
1.	"Cloudless Skies"	1:11
2.	"Overture"	1:48
3.	"Life Boat"	2:07
4.	"Deep Water"	3:01
5.	"Gentle Waves"	1:41
6.	"Rigging"	1:54
7.	"Darting Distance"	1:37
8.	"Flare Gun"	1:05
9.	"Full Sail"	2:40
10.	"Storm Approaching"	4:17
11.	"Midnight Storm"	2:51
12.	"Harpoon"	3:25
13.	"God's Rays"	5:10
14.	"Safe Return"	3:52
Total length:		36:39

== Awards ==
Award	Date of ceremony	Category	Recipient(s)	Result	Ref.
Hollywood Music in Media Awards	November 16, 2022	Best Original Score in an Independent Film	Rob Simonsen	Nominated	
Society of Composers & Lyricists Awards	February 15, 2023	Outstanding Original Score for an Independent Film	Rob Simonsen	Nominated	
