= Tully (soundtrack) =

Tully (Music from the Motion Picture)

Soundtrack album / film score by Rob Simonsen and various artists
- Released: May 4, 2018
- Genres: Film score; film soundtrack
- Length: 76:48
- Label: Back Lot Music
- Producer: Rob Simonsen

Rob Simonsen chronology
The House of Tomorrow (2018)	Tully (2018)	The Front Runner (2018)

Tully (Music from the Motion Picture) is the soundtrack album to the 2018 film Tully directed by Jason Reitman and starring Charlize Theron, Mackenzie Davis, Mark Duplass, and Ron Livingston. The film score is composed by Rob Simonsen and the soundtrack was released on May 4, 2018, under the Back Lot Music label. The album accompanied Simon's songs and well as the licensed music and covers heard in the film.

== Background ==
Rob Simonsen composed the score for Tully in his maiden collaboration with Jason. He had used some of Simonsen's temp scores from earlier films and had approached the composer in person; during their interaction, Simonsen had written music for the film which he liked and was brought forward for the film. The composition process of the film "went really great". Simonsen complimented on Jason's nuances on understanding music, which had been integral throughout most of his films, and knew what he wants in terms of music. They discussed on several textures, instruments, voices and musical ideas for Tully as well as The Front Runner, their subsequent collaboration. He usually aligned on Jason's vision of the specific sound that were needed and would reject or change any piece which Jason does not like. That provided the sound for the film.

The acoustic guitar was the predominant instrument used for the score. Multi-instrumentalist Christopher Ray used that guitar made by John Asher. Simonsen approached Ray after liking his guitar pieces for The Spectacular Now (2013) and felt the sound would work, resulting in him deciphering and playing some of the structures and sketches to Ray, which he liked it. Simonsen added that the imperfections heard in the sounds works in the drama films, as "There's a humanness to it and it's not so clean that it can be a midi sample. It's got character and vibe." Simonsen recorded Ray's style of guitar playing by running it through the pedalboard and getting the amount of overdrive, reverb and delay, and Jason liked it, remaining it to be unchanged throughout the score. This instigated him the habit of making recordings which would stay the same as the initial recording. Besides that, he also bought the guitar made by Asher and had it in his studio.

The film featured several songs, such as the cover of "You Only Live Twice", the James Bond theme for the eponymous 1967 film, performed by Kaitlyn Dever and her sister Mady under the pseudonym Beulahbelle. They had performed two versions—one included the original version, and the other, was the living room version. They had also performed an original track titled "Let You Go". Besides their songs, the album further accompanied various other licensed music, only few of them were included in the soundtrack.

== Track listing ==
No.	Title	Artist(s)	Length
1.	"Ride Into the Sun" (Demo Version)	The Velvet Underground	3:21
2.	"Tiergarten" (Supermayer Remix)	Rufus Wainwright	2:34
3.	"Abstract"	Rob Simonsen	0:12
4.	"Choices and Judgements"	Rob Simonsen	0:42
5.	"Bike Ride"	Rob Simonsen	0:43
6.	"You Only Live Twice" (Living Room Version)	Beulahbelle	2:04
7.	"Tully"	Rob Simonsen	3:54
8.	"Jogging in the Park"	Rob Simonsen	0:42
9.	"Blue"	The Jayhawks	3:09
10.	"Driving Back Home"	Rob Simonsen	1:56
11.	"Time to Say Goodbye" (Mermaid Scene)	Rob Simonsen	1:14
12.	"Let You Go"	Beulahbelle	3:13
13.	"In a Black Out" (Instrumental Version)	Hamilton Leithauser and Rostam Batmanglij	3:15
14.	"You Only Live Twice"	Beulahbelle	3:26
Total length:			30:25

== Reception ==
Charlie Bridgen of The Quietus wrote "the brief and minimalist guitar-led score is still able to have influence, with an evocative dreaminess that contrasts with the songs throughout." "Rob Simonsen's pulsating score to create a rapid tempo of diaper changes and breast feeding [earns] mad respect for what moms endure." David D'Arcy of Screen International and a critic from The Hollywood Reporter described the score as "emotional" and "moving".
