= Don't Say Good Luck =

2026 musical drama film by Julia Hart

- Release poster
- Directed by: Julia Hart
- Screenplay by: Laura Hankin; Julia Hart; Jordan Horowitz
- Story by: Laura Hankin
- Produced by: Adam Sandler; Jackie Sandler; Jordan Horowitz; Brian Kavanaugh-Jones; Fred Berger
- Starring: Sunny Sandler; Melanie Lynskey; Max Greenfield; Jack Champion; Stephanie Beatriz; Bebe Neuwirth; Steve Buscemi
- Cinematography: Bryce Fortner
- Edited by: Shayar Bhansali
- Music by: Yuli
- Production companies: Happy Madison Productions; Range Media Partners; Original Headquarters
- Distributed by: Netflix
- Release date: August 14, 2026
- Running time: 95 minutes
- Country: United States
- Language: English

Don't Say Good Luck is a 2026 American musical teen drama film directed and co-produced by Julia Hart, co-produced by Adam Sandler, Jackie Sandler, Jordan Horowitz and Brian Kavanaugh-Jones, and starring Sunny Sandler, Melanie Lynskey, Max Greenfield, Jack Champion, Stephanie Beatriz, Bebe Neuwirth, and Steve Buscemi. The film was produced by Happy Madison Productions and distributed by Netflix where it tells the story of a 16-year old girl who auditions for the high school musical of Waitress and copes with her mother's returning cancer. The film has received overall positive reviews from critics.

== Plot ==
The quiet 16-year old Sophie Birenbaum is surprised to have landed a leading role in her high school musical of Waitress, when she inadvertently discovers her mother's cancer has returned. Although her best friend Carolyn insists she will support her, she starts acting weird and is suddenly busy with other things and Sophie soon feels left out.

To help Sophie find her southern accent, her mother Elizabeth takes her to the mall to practice on salespeople. By the time they finish, her mother convinces her the director of the musical made the right choice. Later, her mom and dad Ted learn the cancer is advancing more quickly than expected, but Elizabeth is adament to not reveal the news yet so Sophie does not quit the musical.

As rehearsals progress, Sophie discovers her character is scripted to kiss her crush Jack. She starts to tell Carolyn about it, but another student Erin interrupts to talk about the hike they did yesterday. That is how Sophie discovers inadvertently that her best friend has not only left the play, but also found someone else to spend time with. Hurt, she distances herself.

At home, as Sophie's grandparents have come to help out. Her grandmother Linda has a fit that Sophie has a Sunday dress rehearsal on Mothers Day. Elizabeth, frustrated that Linda has almost revealed how imminent her dying is, asks Ted to get them to leave.

Sophie goes to Carolyn's to vent. Afterwards Erin invites them to a friend's house as they can use it to have an adult-free party. Sophie ends up getting drunk, so manages to sneak home. The next morning, the grandparents leave.

The family tries to spend Mother's Day together at the deli, but Elizabeth collapses. So, after going to the hospital, the parents say that she will not be strong enough to see the play in person nor spend their usual month by the lake. Sophie goes to rehearsal and afterwards the crew have a party.

As it is apparently common, many crew members hook up. Before Sophie can find Jack, he hooks up with an ex. Later, he gives her a lift home. When Jack tries to lean over to kiss her, she reveals she saw him kissing Mallory and is disgusted. Sophie says she only wants to kiss the right guys from now on.

Elizabeth covertly contacts the musical's director and asks her to hook her up so she can watch the dress rehearsal from home. Some of the crew find out, and eventually it gets back to Sophie. Up to then she had told no one about her mother's advanced cancer. Once she finds out about the video feed, Sophie breaks down on stage and is not able to continue. She hurries back home and chews out her mother for not having let her know. Elizabeth confirms that her death is imminent.

Sophie has to stay strong for her two younger brothers while her dad handles the family deli. The next morning Sophie helps get her brothers up for school. On the car ride, after the boys leave for school, both she and her dad Ted admit they are not okay. Upon arriving at school, Carolyn promises to support Sophie. There is confirmation that she and Erin are a couple, which Sophie fully supports.

Sophie initially asks Mallory to take over her part in the performance so she can rush home to be with her mom. However, she is convinced to return, upon which she takes over her role again with no problem. In the meantime, Elizabeth patches up things with her parents, who have already shown up to see Sophie's show.

Once the summer begins, the family sets up their back lawn, decorated by the musical crew to make it look like the beach house. There Sophie performs one of the songs for her mom.

== Cast ==
- Sunny Sandler as Sophie Birenbaum, a girl preparing for her high school musical performance of Waitress
- Melanie Lynskey as Elizabeth Birenbaum, Sophie's mother and co-proprietor of a deli who is dying of cancer
- Max Greenfield as Ted Birenbaum, Sophie's father and co-proprietor of a deli
- Jack Champion as Jack Davis, Sophie's crush who is coincidentally cast as her character's love interest in the play
- Stephanie Beatriz as Ms. Parker, the school play's director
- Bebe Neuwirth as Linda, Sophie's grandmother who has a complicated relationship with Elizabeth
- Steve Buscemi as Dale, Sophie's grandfather
- Scarlett Estevez as Carolyn Morales, Sophie's best friend
- Jon Lovitz as Lenny
- Emma McNulty as Erin, a student who later becomes Carolyn's girlfriend
- Elyse Bell as Mallory Sinclair
- Matan M. Friedman and Eitan O. Friedman as Caleb and Ethan Birenbaum, Sophie's younger brothers

== Production ==
In April 2025, the film's title Don't Say Good Luck was announced, it would be directed by Julia Hart, co-produced by Hart, Jordan Horowitz and Adam Sandler, starring Sunny Sandler and distributed by Netflix. In June 2025, Deadline Hollywood confirmed that Melanie Lynskey, Max Greenfield, Stephanie Beatriz, Bebe Neuwirth, and Steve Buscemi had joined the cast. In August, Jack Champion joined the cast.

Principal photography began in July 2025 coinciding with another Happy Madison–production starring Sandler's sister Sadie, Roommates (2026) in New Jersey.

== Release ==
Don't Say Good Luck was released on Netflix worldwide on August 14, 2026.

== Reception ==
On the review aggregator website Rotten Tomatoes, 93% of 43 critics' reviews are positive, with an average rating of 7.1/10. Metacritic, which uses a weighted average, assigned the film a score of 73 out of 100, based on 11 critics, indicating "generally favorable" reviews.
