= Graham Verchere =

Canadian actor

- Born: Graham Marc Verchere; Vancouver, British Columbia, Canada
- Occupation: Actor
- Years active: 2014–present

Graham Marc Verchere is a Canadian actor. He is known for roles in Stargirl, Fargo, The Good Doctor and Summer of 84.

== Early life ==
Verchere was born in Vancouver to Cynthia, a pediatric plastic surgeon at BC Children's Hospital, and Bruce, a diabetes researcher at the University of British Columbia. He has a twin brother and an older brother. Verchere and his twin brother became involved in acting because of their cousin.

== Career ==
In 2014, Verchere landed his first voice role in My Little Pony: Friendship Is Magic as Pip Squeak. In 2017, Verchere appeared as the recurring character Nathan Burgle in Fargo, Tommy Walters in the film Woody Woodpecker, and the role of young Shaun Murphy in The Good Doctor.

In 2018, Verchere appeared in the horror mystery film Summer of 84. On 21 August 2018, it was announced that Verchere would be starring as Leo Borlock in Disney's movie adaptation of Jerry Spinelli's young adult novel Stargirl. The film Stargirl was released on Disney+ on 13 March 2020. In 2022, he was cast as series regular Keith in Fox's Alert: Missing Persons Unit.

== Filmography ==
Key
†	Denotes films that have not yet been released

=== Film ===
Year	Title	Role	Notes
2017	Woody Woodpecker	Tommy Walters	
2018	Summer of 84	Davey Armstrong	
2020	Stargirl	Leo Borlock	
2025	Don't Forget About Me	Kendall Flynn	Short film
2025	Sylvania		
2026	How to Lose a Popularity Contest	Rowan Cross	
TBA	Split Rock	Trevor	
TBA	Any Other World †	Scott	

=== Television ===
Year	Title	Role	Notes
2014	Along Came a Nanny	Brody	Television film
2014	Psych	Buduski	Episode: "A Nightmare on State Street"
2014	Signed, Sealed, Delivered	Young Danny Barrett	Episode: "The Masterpiece"
2014–2017	My Little Pony: Friendship Is Magic	Pip Squeak / Chipcutter (voices)	Recurring role
2015	Impastor	Miles	Episode: "The Body of Kenny Compels You"
2015	Jim Henson's Turkey Hollow	Tim Emmerson	Television film
2015	My New Best Friend	Jonathan	Television film
2015	Once Upon a Time	Young Apprentice	Episode: "Nimue"
2015	Perfect Match	Luke	Television film
2017	Escape from Mr. Lemoncello's Library	Curtis Keeley	Television film
2017	Fargo	Nathan Burgle	Recurring role (season 3)
2017–2022	The Good Doctor	Young Shaun Murphy	Recurring role
2018	Deadly Deed: A Fixer Upper Mystery	Elliot	Television film
2018–2019	Supergirl	George Lockwood	Recurring role (season 4)
2020	50 States of Fright	Liam	Episode: "13 Steps to Hell"
2021	Our Christmas Journey	Henry	Television film
2022	Two Sentence Horror Stories	Pete	Episode: "Toxic"
2023	Alert: Missing Persons Unit	Keith	Main role
2023	The Power	Urbandox	Recurring role
2023	Creepshow	Martin	Episode: "George Romero in 3-D"
2023	The Fall of the House of Usher	Younger Roderick Usher	Episode: "A Midnight Dreary"
2025	Wild Cards	Jackson	Episode: "Death by Design"
2025	Family Law	Ryder	Episode: "Knowing Me, Knowing You

== Music ==
Title	Year	Album	Notes
"Thirteen"	2020	Stargirl (Original Soundtrack)	Duet with Grace VanderWaal Song originally by Big Star
"Just What I Needed"	2020	Stargirl (Original Soundtrack)	Song originally by the Cars

== Awards and nominations ==
Year	Award	Category	Nominated work	Result	Ref.
2015	Young Artist Awards	Best Performance in Live Theater – Young Actor	Mary Poppins	Nominated	
2016	Young Artist Awards	Best Performance in a TV Movie, Miniseries, Special or Pilot – Young Actor	Perfect Match	Nominated	
2016	Young Artist Awards	Best Performance in a TV Series – Guest Starring Young Actor (11–13)	Impastor	Won	
2016	Young Artist Awards	Best Performance in a TV Series – Supporting Young Actor	Once Upon a Time	Nominated	
2016	Young Artist Awards	Best Performance in a Voice-Over Role – Young Actor (12–21)	My Little Pony: Friendship Is Magic	Won	
