= Trap House (film) =

2025 film by Michael Dowse

- Theatrical release poster
- Directed by: Michael Dowse
- Screenplay by: Gary Scott Thompson; Tom O'Connor
- Story by: Gary Scott Thompson
- Produced by: Marc Goldberg; Sarah Gabriel; Dave Bautista; Jonathan Mesner; Michael Pruss; Rebecca Feuer; Christian Mercuri; Todd Lundbohm
- Starring: Dave Bautista; Jack Champion; Sophia Lillis; Tony Dalton; Whitney Peak; Inde Navarrette; Zaire Adams; Kate del Castillo; Bobby Cannavale
- Cinematography: Matt Flannery
- Edited by: Tim Porter
- Music by: Amanda Yamate; Jack Latham
- Production companies: Signature; Scott Free; Dogbone; 828 Productions; Capstone Pictures
- Distributed by: Aura Entertainment (United States); Amazon MGM Studios (United Kingdom)
- Release date: November 14, 2025 (United States)
- Running time: 103 minutes
- Countries: United States; United Kingdom
- Languages: English; Spanish

Trap House is a 2025 action thriller film directed by Michael Dowse and written by Gary Scott Thompson and Tom O'Connor. Set in El Paso, Texas, the film follows an undercover DEA agent (Dave Bautista) and his colleagues in a game of cat and mouse with their teenage children, who use their parents' tactics and intel to rob a dangerous cartel.

The cast includes Jack Champion, Sophia Lillis, Blu del Barrio, Tony Dalton, Whitney Peak, Inde Navarrette, Zaire Adams, Kate del Castillo, and Bobby Cannavale. It was released in the United States on November 14, 2025, by Aura Entertainment.

== Plot ==
A team of agents with the Drug Enforcement Agency (DEA) raids a tunnel used to funnel drugs. The team, led by Agents Ray Seale and Andre Washburn, comes under heavy fire, and an agent is killed.

Ray's son, Cody, belongs to a friend group of high school students who are children of DEA agents. The group includes Jesse, the child of the agent who died. The death leaves Jesse's family in difficult financial circumstances, compelling them to move. Cody is upset that the DEA does not offer better financial help for Jesse's family.

In Mexico, criminal boss Benito Cabrera is angry about the raid on the tunnel. He suspects a rat and orders the killing of one of his men. Cabrera's sister, Natalia, goes to El Paso to manage operations there.

Cody and his friends get the idea to start robbing trap houses because they want the money for Jesse. Using their parents' intel and equipment, including night vision goggles, they pull off the heist but steal less than five hundred dollars. They decide to do it again, robbing a van, stealing much more money, and further upsetting Cabrera. Deni ends up in the hospital with a delayed onset concussion. Cody wants to keep going by robbing another truck, but his friends are hesitant; only Kyle agrees to continue. They manage to steal the truck, which is filled with drugs, but Ray recognizes his son.

Cody's girlfriend, Teresa, comes over to the house with her mom, who is revealed as Natalie. Teresa figures out that Cody stole the truck. Natalie has Deni kidnapped from the hospital. Cody must return the drugs to secure her return. Ray tracks Cody's phone; he and other DEA agents kill Benito and Natalie. Ray makes it look like Cody was kidnapped along with Deni.

Jesse and his family return to the area. The others meet him at his new house for a reunion. As they enter Jesse's house, Teresa quietly views them from a distance. Back in Mexico, Teresa prepares to smother her grandfather due to his medical condition.

== Cast ==
- Dave Bautista as DEA Agent Ray Seale
- Jack Champion as Cody Seale
- Sophia Lillis as Deni Matthews-Morales
- Kate del Castillo as Natalia Cabrera
- Tony Dalton as Benito Cabrera
- Whitney Peak as Yvonne Reynolds
- Bobby Cannavale as DEA Agent Andre Washburn
- Inde Navarrette as Teresa Flores
- Blu del Barrio as Jesse Padilla
- Zaire Adams as Kyle Albright-Alvarez

== Production ==
In April 2024, it was revealed that an action thriller film directed by Michael Dowse and written by Gary Scott Thompson and Tom O'Connor was in development, with Dave Bautista set to star and Jack Champion, Sophia Lillis, Kate del Castillo, Whitney Peak, Tony Dalton, and Bobby Cannavale rounding out the main cast. Inde Navarrette, Zaire Adams and Blu del Barrio also joined the cast. The film was financed and executive produced by Capstone Studios, Signature Entertainment, Creativity Media, and Ashland Hill Media Finance.

=== Filming ===
Principal photography began on April 1, 2024, and took place in and around Albuquerque, New Mexico.

== Release ==
In May 2025, Aura Entertainment acquired Trap House as its maiden release, scheduling it for a wide theatrical release in the United States on November 14, 2025.

== Reception ==
On review aggregator Rotten Tomatoes, the film holds a 52% approval rating based on 21 critics, with an average rating of 5.6/10. Glenn Kenny of RogerEbert.com awarded the film 2 1/2 out of four stars. Kenny found the development of some characters unconvincing, but he wrote that the "narrative moves along at a spanking pace, and the action is staged and shot at a pretty high level". In The Hollywood Reporter, Frank Scheck called the film's premise "absurd", though he praised Bautista's "big-lug charisma".
