= Hollywood Stargirl =

2022 film by Julia Hart

- Official release poster
- Directed by: Julia Hart
- Written by: Jordan Horowitz; Julia Hart
- Based on: Characters by Jerry Spinelli
- Produced by: Ellen Goldsmith-Vein; Lee Stollman; Jordan Horowitz
- Starring: Grace VanderWaal; Elijah Richardson; Tyrel Jackson Williams; Judy Greer; Judd Hirsch; Uma Thurman
- Cinematography: Bryce Fortner
- Edited by: Shayar Bhansali; Tracey Wadmore-Smith
- Music by: Michael Penn (songs); Rob Simonsen; Duncan Blickenstaff
- Production companies: Walt Disney Pictures; Gotham Group
- Distributed by: Disney+
- Release dates: May 23, 2022 (El Capitan Theatre); June 3, 2022 (United States)
- Running time: 105 minutes
- Country: United States
- Language: English

Hollywood Stargirl is a 2022 American teen romantic drama film directed by Julia Hart from a screenplay that she co-wrote with Jordan Horowitz. The film is a sequel to the 2020 film Stargirl, which was in turn based on Jerry Spinelli's 2000 novel of the same name; it is not an adaptation of the novel's sequel Love, Stargirl.

The story follows Stargirl and her mother Ana, who is hired as the costume designer on a movie, as they relocate to Los Angeles, where Stargirl meets new friends and explores her creative side, gaining success as a performer.

The film premiered on May 23, 2022, at the El Capitan Theatre in Los Angeles, California, and was released on Disney+ on June 3, 2022. It received positive reviews.

== Plot ==
Having moved from Arizona, Stargirl and her mother Ana arrive in Los Angeles to start a new life. Ana has gotten a job as a costume designer for a feature film, but the director is notoriously difficult to work with. While strumming in her room, Stargirl meets Evan, who lives in her new apartment building. He and his brother Terrell are making a sizzle reel for a potential film and would like her to write the music and possibly act in the film. While Stargirl has never acted before, she is convinced by the brothers and visits Terrell's workplace, a bar called Forte. Stargirl recognizes one of the regular visitors, known to the brothers as "Table Six", as Roxanne Martel, a one-hit wonder who left the music scene to become a producer; she is the actual owner of Forte.

Ana's busy work schedule leaves Stargirl to her own devices. She buys a pair of headphones for her grumpy neighbor, Mr. Mitchell, who begins to open up and reveals that he was once a film producer. Stargirl also meets with Roxanne to ask if she may use her song "Miracle Mile" for the sizzle reel, but Roxanne refuses, giving the impression that she is anti-social and bitter. Stargirl and Evan decide to write their own song, "Figure It Out", and Roxanne reveals that she denied them the use of her song to encourage them to create their own. She allows them to use a professional studio to record. Stargirl and Evan begin a romance.

Stargirl, Evan and Terrell finish the sizzle reel and send it out. As they wait for a response, Stargirl relates her past to Evan. Terrell eventually learns that an executive named Priya Collins has picked up the sizzle reel. She offers them a budget of one million dollars; enough to shoot their film. At home, Ana tells Stargirl that her film's production has shut down due to the director's behavior and that she has accepted a job in Berkeley. Stargirl is angry, as she is growing to love life in Los Angeles and realizes that Ana's issues stem from her fear of settling down. Mr. Mitchell advises her that one should learn from their mistakes and tells her that he was inspired by hearing her conversation with Terrell.

Stargirl persuades Ana that they should stay and that she needs to accept the mistakes in life. At Forte, Evan and Terrell are surprised to see Stargirl with Roxanne in a new music group called Table Six and the Shirley Temples. They are happy to learn that she will be staying. Later, Terrell begins filming his new movie, Tell Your Story, with Evan and Stargirl in the leads.

== Cast ==
- Grace VanderWaal as Susan "Stargirl" Caraway
- Judy Greer as Ana Caraway, Stargirl's mother
- Elijah Richardson as Evan
- Tyrel Jackson Williams as Terrell, Evan's older brother
- Nija Okoro as Daphne
- Al Madrigal as Iggy
- Judd Hirsch as Mr. Mitchell
- Uma Thurman as Roxanne Martel
- Chris Williams as George
- Sarayu Blue as Priya Collins
- Ben Geurens as Daniel
- Kristin Slaysman as Jody
- Conor Husting as Pedro
- Sara Amini as Nicole
- Noah Taliferro as Mike
- Kelly Sry as Daryl
- Adrienne Beal as June
- Starr Gilliard as Etta Tutu
- Matt Cordova as Ken

== Production ==
A sequel to Stargirl was announced to be in development. Julia Hart returned to direct, while Grace VanderWaal reprises her role as Stargirl Caraway. Elijah Richardson and Judy Greer joined the cast by February 2021, with Greer replacing Sara Arrington as Ana, Stargirl's mother. Michael Penn wrote music for the film, while Hart and Jordan Horowitz wrote the screenplay. By March Uma Thurman, Judd Hirsch and Tyrel Jackson Williams had joined the cast.

Principal photography began in May 2021 in Orange County, California, and wrapped in July. VanderWaal wrote and performed an original song in the film, "Figure it Out".

== Release ==
The official trailer was released on May 2, 2022, and the film premiered on May 23, 2022, at the El Capitan Theatre in Los Angeles, California. It was released on Disney+ on June 3, 2022.

The film was removed from Disney+ on May 26, 2023, alongside its prequel, Stargirl, as part of a Disney+ and Hulu purge. It was released on VOD platforms including Amazon Prime Video, Google Play and Vudu on September 26, 2023.

== Reception ==
On the review aggregator website Rotten Tomatoes, 94% of 17 critics' reviews are positive, with an average rating of 6.8/10.

Courtney Howard of Variety stated that "Hart's sequel manages to develop a new Disney franchise that stays both creative and pleasant" and praised the narrative and the performances. Noel Murray of Los Angeles Times found the film "even more pleasant than its predecessor and the cast members likable", while complimenting the music. Natalia Winkelman of The New York Times commented that "Stargirl appears more balanced and charismatic than the previous movie". Radhika Menon of Decider found VanderWaal "very charismatic as Stargirl", liked the performances of the actors and the chemistry between them, and praised the film's positive messages and role models. Kate Erbland of IndieWire gave the film a B− rating, finding Stargirl to be "an unconventional yet agreeable character that emphasizes self-authenticity", complimented the film for its humor and sensitivity and praised the performances. Jennifer Green of Common Sense Media rated the film 3 out of 5 stars, commended the film's positive messages, citing kindness and hope and its diverse cast, and praised the presence of role models, stating that VanderWaal's character is "a respectful, open-minded and inspiring character".
