= The Cleanse =

2016 American dark fantasy comedy film

- Theatrical release poster
- Directed by: Bobby Miller
- Screenplay by: Bobby Miller
- Produced by: Aaron L. Gilbert; Jordan Horowitz; Johnny Galecki
- Starring: Johnny Galecki; Anna Friel; Oliver Platt; Anjelica Huston; Kyle Gallner; Kevin J. O'Connor; Diana Bang
- Cinematography: Michael Fimognari
- Edited by: Josh Crockett
- Music by: Eskmo; Rob Simonsen
- Production companies: Alcide Bava Pictures; Bron Studios; Gilbert Films
- Distributed by: Vertical Entertainment
- Release dates: March 13, 2016 (SXSW); May 4, 2018 (United States)
- Running time: 81 minutes
- Country: United States
- Language: English

The Cleanse is a 2016 American dark fantasy comedy film written and directed by Bobby Miller. The film stars Johnny Galecki, Anna Friel, Oliver Platt, Anjelica Huston, Kyle Gallner, Kevin J. O'Connor, and Diana Bang. It was released on May 4, 2018, by Vertical Entertainment.

== Plot ==
Depressed and disappointed with his life after losing his job and his fiancée, Paul Berger attends a selection seminar for "Let's Get Pure", a secretive self-help program created by Ken Roberts. At the selection meeting, Paul takes an interest in fellow applicant Maggie Jameson. Paul is selected for the program's purification retreat. He is hesitant to sign a liability waiver that mentions the possibility of death, but agrees to participate after learning that Maggie was also selected.

Paul is escorted by car to the retreat's secluded woodland location. There, he meets Fredericks, who has been participating in the program for several weeks. Paul and Maggie also learn that two other applicants, Eric and his girlfriend Laurie, were selected to join the retreat.

Lily conducts the program. Each of the new participants is given four personally-formulated cleanse drinks that they are to consume before the end of the first day. Because of their horrible taste, Laurie is unable to finish her fourth drink while everyone else completes the first stage of cleansing. Paul gets sick during the night and throws up in the sink. The next day, a small creature emerges from the sink's drainpipe. The creature grows as time goes by. Paul nurtures his creature, realizing it is a physical manifestation of the negativity he purged from his system.

Maggie tries to leave the camp when she first confronts her creature, but Lily convinces her to stay. Eric spends time with his creature while Laurie is bedridden with an illness from having not completed her cleanse. Paul discovers Fredericks in battle with his creature, which has grown into a more monstrous form with time, in Fredericks' cabin. Fredericks insists that the situation is his to handle.

Maggie asks Paul to help understand her creature, as it seemingly refuses to bond with her. The two of them discover that their creatures are drawn to each other and also reflect their individual characteristics. Eric drinks Laurie's last cleanse drink. His creature tries to eat itself. Paul and Maggie continue getting to know one another. Paul's creature unexpectedly bites his finger.

Ken Roberts arrives at the camp. Paul and Maggie are summoned to meet him. Ken interrupts his admonishment of Eric for not following instructions to force Maggie into personal reflection. At the conclusion of their conversation, Ken gives Maggie a blade and instructs her to kill her creature to complete the cleanse. Maggie is unable to do it.

Maggie runs into the woods. Against Ken's command, Paul takes his creature as well as Maggie's and goes after her. Paul finds Eric in his cabin grieving over Laurie's dead body. Horrified, Paul finds Maggie and explains that they need to leave immediately. Ken and Lily catch up to confront Paul and Maggie. Ken says he will allow them to leave, but insists that they turn over their creatures. Paul takes Ken's car keys and continues fleeing. Fredericks is killed by his creature. While Paul drives, Maggie checks on the two creatures in the backseat and discovers them having merged into one Kafkaesque monster. Maggie is bitten, causing Paul to swerve and crash.

When Paul regains consciousness, he sees Maggie trying to kill the fused creature by bludgeoning it with a rock. Paul screams for her to stop before reluctantly realizing it must be killed for their own good. With tears in their eyes, Paul and Maggie strangle the creature with their bare hands, then embrace.

== Cast ==
- Johnny Galecki as Paul Berger
- Anna Friel as Maggie Jameson
- Kyle Gallner as Eric
- Anjelica Huston as Lily
- Diana Bang as Laurie
- Kevin J. O'Connor as Fredericks
- Oliver Platt as Ken Roberts
- David Lewis as Terry
- Loretta Walsh as Jill

== Release ==
The film premiered at South by Southwest on March 13, 2016. It was released on May 4, 2018, by Vertical Entertainment.

== Reception ==
On Rotten Tomatoes, the film has a rating of 79% based on 24 reviews, with an average rating of 5.9/10. The critical consensus reads: "The Cleanse uses its unconventional premise as the framework for a suitably eerie and solidly well-acted horror outing with some surprising emotional heft." On Metacritic, the film has a score of 58 out of 100 based on 5 critics, indicating "mixed or average reviews". FilmAffinity gave it a rating of 4.1 out of 10.
