= I'm Your Woman (film) =

2020 film by Julia Hart

- Release poster
- Directed by: Julia Hart
- Written by: Julia Hart; Jordan Horowitz
- Produced by: Rachel Brosnahan; Jordan Horowitz
- Starring: Rachel Brosnahan; Arinzé Kene; Marsha Stephanie Blake; Bill Heck; Frankie Faison; Marceline Hugot; James McMenamin
- Cinematography: Bryce Fortner
- Edited by: Tracey Wadmore-Smith; Shayar Bansali
- Music by: Aska Matsumiya
- Production companies: Original Headquarters; Big Indie Pictures; Scrap Paper Pictures
- Distributed by: Amazon Studios
- Release dates: October 15, 2020 (AFI); December 4, 2020 (United States)
- Running time: 120 minutes
- Country: United States
- Language: English

I'm Your Woman is a 2020 American neo-noir crime film set in the 1970s and directed by Julia Hart from a screenplay by Hart and Jordan Horowitz. It stars Rachel Brosnahan, Arinzé Kene, Marsha Stephanie Blake, Bill Heck, Frankie Faison, Marceline Hugot, and James McMenamin. Brosnahan plays Jean, a woman on the run after her husband, who is involved with organized crime, mysteriously goes missing.

The film's world premiere occurred at AFI Fest on October 15, 2020. It was given a limited theatrical release on December 4, 2020, followed by a December 11 release on Amazon Prime Video by Amazon Studios. The film received generally positive reviews, with praise for Brosnahan's performance and Hart's direction.

== Plot ==
Jean is a housewife in the late 1970s, married to Eddie, a professional thief. The couple are unable to have or adopt children, something Jean has long since made her peace with. One day, Eddie mysteriously procures a baby boy for Jean to raise. Sometime later, Jean is awakened in the night by one of Eddie's business partners, Jimmy, who gives her a bag of money and instructs Jean to go on the run; she is handed over to a man named Cal, who Jimmy promises will help her. Jean learns from Cal that Eddie has gone missing and that everyone is looking for him. Cal relocates Jean and her baby, Harry, to a vacant house in the suburbs, with strict instructions not to make any friends or acquaintances.

Jean struggles with loneliness in her new surroundings and, defying Cal's instructions, befriends her widowed neighbor, Evelyn. After a late-night walk with Harry, Jean realizes that her home has been broken into and calls a number Cal gave her before escaping to Evelyn's house. There, she discovers some of Eddie's former associates, who believe Jean knows where to find him and beat Evelyn for her location before tying her up. Cal arrives and rescues Jean and Harry, killing everyone else including Evelyn; Jean is horrified, but Cal tells her Evelyn's death was her fault for not listening to him.

Cal relocates Jean and Harry to a remote cabin. He reveals to her that Eddie, an associate of a local crime syndicate, murdered his boss Marvin, plunging the city into gang warfare as different factions are fighting for Marvin's territory. Jean is eventually joined by Teri, Cal's wife, their young son Paul, and Cal's elderly father, Art, who teaches her how to use a gun. Jean eventually pieces together that Teri was formerly married to Eddie, but ran away with her son because of his abusive and controlling nature. Realizing that Cal may be in trouble, Jean decides to join Teri in returning to the city to find him.

To get word to Cal that they are in the city, the two women go to a nightclub, where Jean gets lost during a shootout and becomes separated from Teri, eventually tracking her to a hotel. She learns that Paul is actually Eddie's son and that Teri and Cal, who met and fell in love while working under Eddie, had been living normal lives outside the syndicate until Eddie got in touch with Cal and forced him to help Jean.

Teri and Jean get separated again, and Jean tracks down Cal, who informs her that Eddie is dead. The trio attempt to leave the city, only to be intercepted by a rival gang boss, Mike; Teri crashes the car and Mike takes Jean at gunpoint. Not believing that Eddie is dead, he threatens Jean to tell her where her husband is, but Jean shoots him dead with a pistol previously given to her by Teri. She returns to the scene of the accident and rescues Teri and Cal. They return to the cabin to find Art dead, having killed two hitmen sent by Mike before dying of his wounds. Jean finds Paul cradling his younger half-brother. Reunited with the children, the extended families drive off together.

== Cast ==
- Rachel Brosnahan as Jean
- Arinzé Kene as Cal
- Marsha Stephanie Blake as Teri
- Bill Heck as Eddie
- Frankie Faison as Art
- Marceline Hugot as Evelyn
- James McMenamin as White Mike

== Production ==
In April 2019, Rachel Brosnahan joined the cast of the film, with Julia Hart directing from a screenplay she wrote along with Jordan Horowitz. In September 2019, Arinzé Kene and Marsha Stephanie Blake joined the cast, and Bill Heck, Frankie Faison, Marceline Hugot, and James McMenamin joined in October.

=== Filming ===
Principal photography began in Pittsburgh in October 2019.

== Release ==
The film premiered at the AFI Fest on October 15, 2020. It was given a limited theatrical release on December 4, 2020, followed by a December 11 release on Amazon Prime Video by Amazon Studios.

== Reception ==
On the review aggregator website Rotten Tomatoes, 82% of 158 critics' reviews are positive, with an average rating of 6.9/10. The website's consensus reads: "Smart, sophisticated, and subversive, I'm Your Woman is brought to life by a powerful performance from Rachel Brosnahan – and finds director Julia Hart in near-total command of her craft." Metacritic, which uses a weighted average, assigned the film a score of 63 out of 100, based on 25 critics, indicating "generally favorable" reviews.

In her review at RogerEbert.com, Tomris Laffly gives the film 3.5 out of 4 stars, noting that the film "proudly revives a type of old-fashioned cinema with something new to say. Along the way, it also gives ample room to Brosnahan to become someone completely different than Mrs. Maisel".
