= Lilly Aspell =

British actress and show jumper

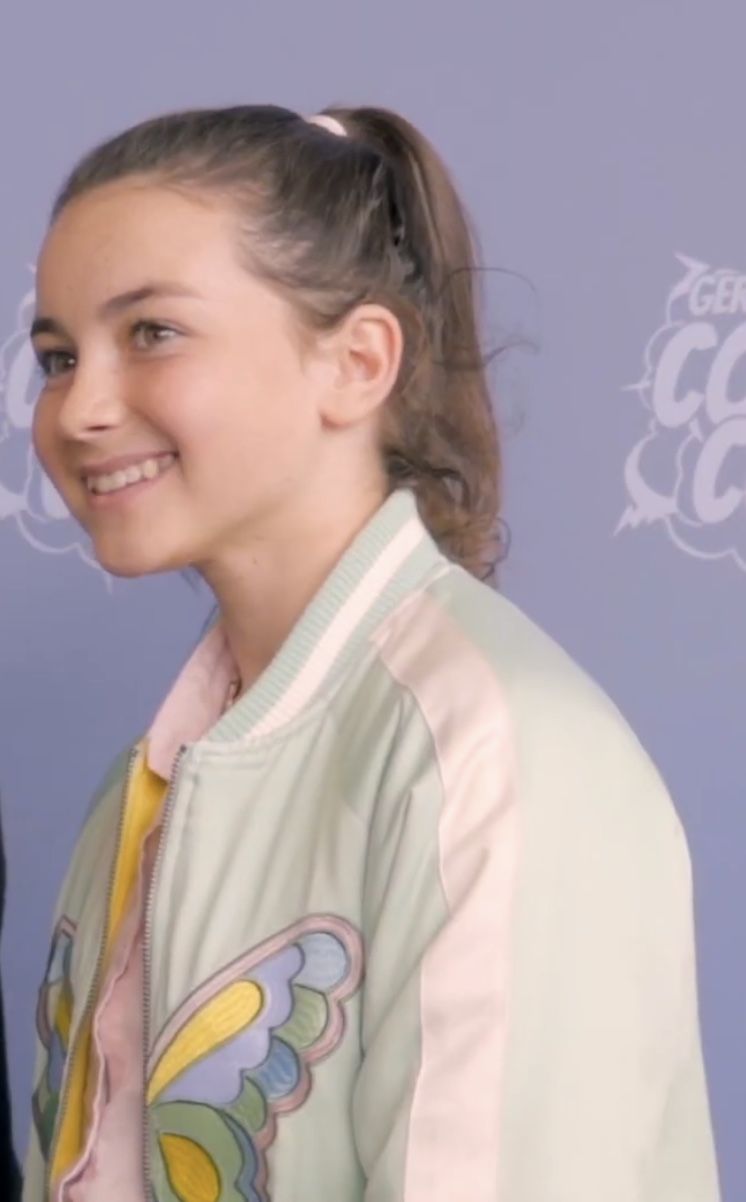
- Aspell in 2021
- Born: 23 October 2007 (age 18); Kilmarnock, East Ayrshire, Scotland
- Occupations: Actress; show jumper
- Years active: 2016–present
- Family: Leighton Aspell (uncle)

Lilly Aspell (born 23 October 2007) is a British actress and equestrian show jumper.

== Early life and education ==
Aspell was born in Kilmarnock, East Ayrshire to Scottish and Irish jockeys Donna Caldwell and Paddy Aspell and spent her early childhood in Springside. She grew up in England, first in Richmond, North Yorkshire where she attended Crakehall Primary School, and then Newmarket, Suffolk with her mother and stepfather.

== Career ==
Having grown up in an equestrian family, Aspell has aspirations to ride for Team GB. She was "four or five" when she started show jumping. At Countryside Live 2017, she won the Talented Showjumping Competition and her team Kildale Wonder Women won the Northern Show Cross Junior Team title. In 2020, she became an ambassador for Theraplate. Aspell won the Blue Chip Pony Newcomers Second Rounds and participated in the 2022 Horse of the Year Show (HOYS).

Aspell began acting when she was scouted by a talent agent whilst shopping in London. She made her feature film debut in the 2017 DC Universe film Wonder Woman as young Diana, a role she would reprise in Wonder Woman 1984 in 2020. Aspell performed most of her own stunts for the role. She also appeared in the film Extinction and made her live-action television debut as young Linda in the Amazon Prime series The Pursuit of Love.

In 2023, Aspell had a starring role in the action film Retribution with Liam Neeson.

== Filmography ==
=== Film ===
Year	Title	Role	Notes
2017	Wonder Woman	Young Diana Prince	
2018	Extinction	Megan	
2018	Holmes & Watson	Newschild	
2020	Wonder Woman 1984	Young Diana Prince	
2023	Retribution	Emily Turner	
2024	Young Woman and the Sea	Young Margaret Ederle	
2024	Here	Bethany	

=== Television ===
Year	Title	Role	Notes
2020	DC Super Hero Girls	Young Diana Prince / Wonder Woman (voice)	Episode: "#AwesomeAuntAntiope"
2021	The Pursuit of Love	Young Linda Radlett	1 episode
2021	Hansel & Gretel: After Ever After	Gretel	Television film
