= The Night Sitter =

- Directed by: Abiel Bruhn; John Rocco
- Written by: Abiel Bruhn; John Rocco
- Produced by: Cristian Quintero; Jeffrey Riddick; Carol Rocco; Cordelia Rocco; John Rocco; Vito Rocco; Jerome Tannenbaum
- Starring: Elyse Dufour; Jack Champion; Jermaine Rivers; Amber Neukum; J. Benedict Larmore; Ben Barlow; Bailey Campbell; Joe Walz; Deanna Meske; Manny Sandow
- Cinematography: Scotty G. Field
- Edited by: Tristan Borys
- Music by: Rob Himebaugh
- Production company: Roller Disco Massacre
- Distributed by: Uncork'd Entertainment
- Release dates: March 5, 2018 (KTIFF); August 6, 2019 (United States)
- Running time: 88 minutes
- Country: United States
- Language: English

The Night Sitter is a 2018 American comedy horror film directed by Abiel Bruhn and John Rocco. It stars Elyse Dufour, Jack Champion, Jermaine Rivers, Amber Neukum, J. Benedict Larmore, Ben Barlow, Bailey Campbell, Joe Walz, Deanna Meske and Manny Sandow.

The film had its world premiere at the Kosmorama Trondheim International Film Festival on March 5, 2018. It was released on August 6, 2019, by Uncork’d Entertainment.

== Plot ==
A scheming con artist poses as innocent babysitter “Amber” to steal from Ted Hooper, a wealthy occult enthusiast with a reclusive son named Kevin. Her crew arrives to clean out the house just as Kevin stumbles upon one of his father’s most prized artifacts and unwittingly summons a trio of witches known as The Three Mothers. As the playful, sadistic witches start picking people off, Amber and Kevin form an unlikely bond and try to survive the night together.

== Cast ==
- Elyse Dufour as Amber
- Jack Champion as Kevin
- Jermaine Rivers as Rod
- Joe Walz as Ted Hooper
- Amber Neukum as Lindsey
- Bailey Campbell as Ronnie
- Manny Sandow as Crispy
- J. Benedict Larmore as Martin
- Ben Barlow as Vincent
- Deanna Meske as Charlotte

== Release ==
On February 13, 2019, it was announced that Uncork’d Entertainment had acquired the distribution rights for the film. The film was released digitally on August 6, 2019.

== Reception ==
The Night Sitter has received positive reviews from critics. On the review aggregation website Rotten Tomatoes, the film holds a 78% approval rating with an average rating of 6.1/10 based on nine reviews.
