= Freaky Tales (film) =

2024 film by Anna Boden and Ryan Fleck

- Theatrical release poster
- Directed by: Anna Boden; Ryan Fleck
- Written by: Anna Boden; Ryan Fleck
- Produced by: Anna Boden; Ryan Fleck; Jelani Johnson; Poppy Hanks
- Starring: Pedro Pascal; Ben Mendelsohn; Jay Ellis; Normani; Dominique Thorne; Jack Champion; Tom Hanks
- Cinematography: Jac Fitzgerald
- Edited by: Robert Komatsu
- Music by: Raphael Saadiq
- Production companies: Entertainment One Films; MACRO Media; Gowanus Projection
- Distributed by: Lionsgate
- Release dates: January 18, 2024 (Sundance); April 4, 2025 (United States)
- Running time: 107 minutes
- Country: United States
- Language: English
- Box office: $2,760 (UK)

Freaky Tales is a 2024 American anthology action comedy film written and directed by Anna Boden and Ryan Fleck. The film stars Pedro Pascal, Boden and Fleck's longtime collaborator Ben Mendelsohn, Jay Ellis, singer Normani in her film debut, Dominique Thorne, and Jack Champion.

Freaky Tales premiered at the Sundance Film Festival on January 18, 2024, and was released in theaters on April 4, 2025.

== Plot ==
The film depicts four interconnected stories taking place at real locations and during real historical events in 1987 Oakland, California.

=== "Strength in Numbers: The Gilman Strikes Back" ===
Young punk rock fans, including Tina and Lucid, exit a movie at the Grand Lake Theater when they hear Nazi skinheads in a pickup truck yelling slurs at the crowd outside the theater. They then attend a show of Operation Ivy at 924 Gilman Street when it is also attacked by Nazis who assault the punk fans and destroy the music equipment, ending the show. The next day, the punk rock community vote to organize a defense against future attacks by the Nazis. As they are falling in love, Lucid buys Tina a spiked bracelet for Nazi-stabbing. When the Nazis return to Gilman, the punks are well-armed. The punks of Gilman defeat the Nazis in a cartoonish fight scene. Tina's spiked bracelet emits a magical green light as she fights. The Nazis retreat in their dented pickup trucks and The Punks end the night singing the Black Flag song "Rise Above."

=== "Don't Fight the Feeling" ===
The film returns to the same moment as the first chapter. Two women, Barbie and Entice, are exiting the theater and are also verbally assaulted by the Nazis, who then drive away. This causes a conversation with another moviegoer who is familiar with Barbie and Entice's budding rap career in which they are known as Danger Zone. He invites them to perform with Too Short. Later, at their job scooping ice cream, Barbie and Entice are sexually harassed by a policeman. Feeling unconfident, they appear as Danger Zone on stage and are surprised and demoralized by the misogyny of Too Short's raps. Finding their strength as a magical green light illuminates the microphone, Barbie and Entice respond expertly, stealing the show from Too Short.

=== "Born to Mack" ===
Clint attempts to end his life of crime. Someone from his criminal past, seeking revenge on him, accidentally kills Clint's pregnant wife. With a renewed determination to end his involvement in the underworld, Clint finds the criminal organization he works for is unwilling to let him go, insisting that he pull a job connected to an upcoming basketball game. Believing that his entire family is dead and that he has nothing more to lose, he defies the criminal gang that are trying to use him. Clint is picked up by the police; while at the police station, he learns that his baby survived the attack on his wife. The police ask Clint to identify the man who shot his wife, which he emphatically refuses to do as he had killed that man's father on a previous job.

=== "The Legend of Sleepy Floyd" ===
While Sleepy Floyd is playing a record-setting game with the Golden State Warriors, his house is robbed, his family attacked and his girlfriend is murdered by the Nazi gang leader Travis. Floyd is given a tip about the identity of the Nazis by the punks, who have overheard a conversation between Clint and another criminal. Floyd takes revenge on them with his supernatural martial arts skills. The gang ringleader, the policeman who earlier sexually harassed Barbie and Entice, also turns out to be “The Guy” who Clint has been working for. In an attempt to keep Clint working for him, The Guy has kidnapped Clint and his newborn baby. The Guy's head is exploded by Floyd's mind powers as Floyd meditates. Clint then frees himself from captivity amid the carnage. At the end, Floyd is seen in an advertisement for a meditation class. He issues a stern warning to Nazis, and is joined by the punks, the members of Danger Zone, and other characters from throughout the movie.

== Cast ==
- Pedro Pascal as Clint
- Jay Ellis as Sleepy Floyd
- Normani as Entice
- Dominique Thorne as Barbie
- Ben Mendelsohn as the guy
- Ji-young Yoo as Tina
- Angus Cloud as Travis
- Jack Champion as Lucid
- Keir Gilchrist as Josh
- Marteen as Kohlrabi
- Tom Hanks as Hank, video store owner
- Too Short as the guy's partner / narrator
- Sleepy Floyd as sleepy fan
- Marshawn Lynch as a bus driver
- Tim Armstrong as a Psytropic client on a TV commercial

== Production ==
It was announced in August 2022 that Anna Boden and Ryan Fleck would be writing and directing the film, which is based on Fleck's memories of growing up in Oakland, California in the 1980s (and is a celebration of the city's culture). Oakland musician Too Short and his talent manager David Weintraub served as executive producers. In November, Pedro Pascal, Ben Mendelsohn and Jay Ellis were among the cast announced for the film, which also included multiple notable figures from the Oakland area. Ji-young Yoo would join the cast the following month.

Filming began on November 14, 2022, with production taking place on Telegraph Avenue between 17th and 18th Streets. Restaurant and business owners complained that they had not received prior notice from the film crew or the city, with blocked street access causing a decrease in foot traffic and financial losses of up to $30,000. Oakland's communications director claimed that the film's location manager had posted flyers in the area and spoken to affected businesses directly.

== Release ==
The film premiered at the Sundance Film Festival on January 18, 2024. Shortly before the premiere, Deadline Hollywood reported that Lionsgate had distribution rights to the film following their acquisition of Entertainment One, who financed the film, although there was still a possibility that another interested distributor could acquire it. The film was released by Lionsgate on April 4, 2025.

== Reception ==
=== Critical response ===
On the review aggregator website Rotten Tomatoes, 75% of 153 critics' reviews are positive, with an average rating of 6.4/10. The website's consensus reads: "Bold, funny, and overall entertaining, Freaky Tales is a vibrantly well-acted period piece that makes up in style what it lacks in narrative substance." Metacritic, which uses a weighted average, assigned the film a score of 58 out of 100, based on 30 critics, indicating "mixed or average" reviews.

Valerie Complex of Deadline Hollywood praised the film's visuals, makeup, costumes and soundtrack that "immediately immerse the audience in the look and feel of late 80s Oakland." She also wrote positively about "the magnetic performances by its all star cast", in particular of Pascal's. However, she criticized the narrative, writing that it "struggles to weave these stories into a satisfying whole and without these talented players embracing the commitment required, the film would crumble under its own ambition." In 2026, Freaky Tales was the subject of a 12,000 word essay subtitled “A not-too-short love letter to ‘a love letter to 1980s Oakland’” in the Oakland Review of Books.

=== Accolades ===
The film was an honoree for Variety and the Golden Globe's Breakthrough Artist Awards on January 19, 2024.
