= Jermaine Rivers =

American actor (born 1973)

Jermaine Lateef Rivers (born September 22, 1973) is an American actor. He is best known for his role as Shatter on Fox/Marvel's television series The Gifted. He is also notable for his role as Officer Carter in the Lifetime Channel television series Devious Maids. He also made appearances in Tyler Perry's If Loving You is Wrong (2016) and The Haves and the Have Nots (2018). In 2025, for six months, he appeared on The Young and the Restless as Damian Kane.

== Early life and career ==
Rivers was born in Vicenza, Italy on Caserma Ederle to Brenda J Rivers and Jerry B Rivers (deceased), an active duty U.S. Army service member who was stationed in Italy until 1975. He graduated from Fort Campbell High School in 1992. In 1993, he enlisted in the US Army and attended Basic Training at Fort Jackson, SC. Rivers served on active duty from 17 March 1993 to 31 May 2013. He had a total of five deployments, two of which were combat tours to Iraq and Baghdad while assigned with the 22nd Signal Brigade (2002-2003). Rivers also visited Bagram and Khandahar in Afghanistan while under the 16th Sustainment Brigade command (2009-2010). Rivers' first role in a feature film was in Killing Winston Jones starring Danny Glover and Richard Dreyfuss.

== Career ==
Some of Rivers' earlier film credits include The Sacrament (2013) and Magic Mike XXL (2015). In 2016, Rivers was cast as Frank Colton in episode 1x16 of MacGyver. Rivers reprised the role of Frank Colton originally played by Cleavon Little, a member of The Coltons family of bounty hunters who made frequent appearances in the original MacGyver television series. Rivers' film credits include the suspense thriller Hangman (2017) and Den of Thieves (2018). Rivers appeared as Shatter on The Gifted (2017), and Rod in the horror-comedy The Night Sitter (2018). Rivers was cast in the role of Dee in the Civil War era film Freedom's Path starring Ewen Bremner, RJ Cyler and Gerran Howell. In February 2025, Rivers debuted in the role of Damian King on The Young and the Restless. He exited the role six months later.

== Filmography ==
Film performances
Year	Title	Role
2013	The Sacrament	Eden Parish Guard #1
2013	Four Senses	Bar Patron
2015	Magic Mike XXL	Security Guard
2015	Anomie	Police Officer
2016	Killing Reagan	Man in Crowd
2016	Massacre on Aisle 12	Slim Jim
2017	Hangman	Swat Leader
2018	The Night Sitter	Rod
2018	Den of Thieves	Fed Receiving Guard Jackson
2019	Killing Winston Jones	Deputy
2020	Freedom's Path	Dee

Television performances
Year	Title	Role	Notes
2015	Your Worst Nightmare	Officer Giroux	1 episode
2015	Fatal Attraction	Antwan	2 episodes
2015	Devious Maids	Officer Carter	2 episodes
2016	If Loving You is Wrong	Agent Willis	1 episode
2017	MacGyver	Frank Colton	2 episode
2017	The Haves and the Have Nots	Officer Holmes	2 episodes
2017–2018	The Gifted	Shatter	Recurring role
2019	The Resident	Agent Banks	1 episode
2020	Interrogation	Danny Debarros	2 episodes
