= Starboy =

Starboy or Star Boy may refer to:

- Starboy (album), a 2016 album by the Weeknd
  - "Starboy" (song), the title track from the album by the Weeknd
- Star boy, at Christmas
- Star Boy, a character in the Legion of Super-Heroes from DC Comics
- "Star Boy", a song by Buffy Sainte Marie from Buffy
- Starboy Records, a record label founded by Nigerian singer Wizkid
- "Starboy", an alias for Nigerian singer Wizkid
- "Starboy", a song by Guided by Voices from Same Place the Fly Got Smashed
- Starboy, an Amstrad CPC game
- Starboy Award, at the Oulu International Children's and Youth Film Festival
- InterPlane Starboy, proposed Czech homebuilt aircraft designed by InterPlane Aircraft of Zbraslavice

== People ==
- Star Boy, Mexican wrestler, see Caravana de Campeones (2008)
- Star Boy, Jr. (born 1993), Mexican wrestler, son of wrestler Star Boy
- Starboy Nathan (born 1986), English R&B singer
- Matt Bowden ("Starboy"), rock musician and activist from New Zealand
- Bukayo Saka (born 2001), English footballer whose nickname is "Starboy"

== See also ==
- Starman (disambiguation)
- Stargirl (disambiguation)
