= Miss Stevens =

- Theatrical release poster
- Directed by: Julia Hart
- Written by: Julia Hart; Jordan Horowitz
- Produced by: Michael B. Clark; Gary Gilbert; Jordan Horowitz; Alex Turtletaub
- Starring: Lily Rabe; Timothée Chalamet; Lili Reinhart; Anthony Quintal; Oscar Nunez; Rob Huebel
- Cinematography: Sebastian Wintero
- Edited by: Lee Haugen; Amy McGrath
- Music by: Rob Simonsen
- Production companies: Beachside Films; Gilbert Films; Original Headquarters
- Distributed by: The Orchard
- Release dates: March 12, 2016 (SXSW); September 16, 2016 (United States)
- Running time: 78 minutes
- Country: United States
- Language: English
- Box office: $4,611

Miss Stevens is a 2016 American comedy-drama film directed by Julia Hart, in her feature directorial debut, from a screenplay by Hart and Jordan Horowitz. The film stars Lily Rabe, Timothée Chalamet, Lili Reinhart, Anthony Quintal, Oscar Nunez, and Rob Huebel. The plot follows a teacher who chaperones a small group of high school students to a weekend state drama competition.

The film had its world premiere at SXSW on March 12, 2016. It began a theatrical limited release on September 16, 2016, before being released on video on demand on September 20, 2016, by The Orchard.

== Plot ==
Rachel Stevens is a 29-year-old California high school English teacher who volunteers to chaperone three of her students to a drama competition for the weekend: the organized Margot, affable Sam, and the struggling but talented Billy. On Friday, she meets with the principal to discuss details and learns Billy is on medication for a behavioral disorder. Arriving at the hotel, the group checks in and, during a mixer, Rachel meets another teacher named Walter. They hint about their attraction to each other despite his wife and later have awkward sex in his hotel room. While coming back to her room, she sees Billy sitting with his head in his hands outside his room. When she confronts him, he laughs it off and says he lost his key. Rachel returns and spends the rest of the night drinking in her bedroom and rehearsing dialogue that she uses in the classroom.

The next day, Rachel goes to a car mechanic to repair a flat tire. Billy insists on joining her while the other students rehearse their monologues. He tells her that the rehearsals are optional, and they drive to the mechanic together. Upon learning that they must wait an hour at the shop, they decide to walk a mile to a local diner. While walking back roads, they discuss the conversations from the previous night's dinner. Billy asks her if she is a lesbian, as it was hinted at during the dinner, and she replies that the conversation has turned inappropriate. They return to the hotel, and Sam explains to Billy that he missed the important rehearsals. He walks it off and joins others in the auditorium. During the first round of competition, Margot forgets her monologue from A Streetcar Named Desire and Rachel consoles her. Margot reveals that the trip was not paid for by the school but by her parents. She says that she thinks Billy is a good actor, and if he wins, then the school might put more funding back into the arts. Later, during dinner, Billy calls Rachel by her first name, upsetting her and surprising the other two students.

She leaves dinner to visit Walter, but he rejects her, and she returns to her room. Later Billy knocks on her door to apologize for dinner but, seeing she is sad, barges his way into her room and tries to cheer her up by jumping on her bed. She joins him on the bed and appears careless and relaxed for the first time. Following this, he also asks Rachel personal questions, which results in Rachel unexpectedly confiding in him that she is still struggling after her mother's death a year earlier. Billy comforts her with a hug, which Rachel reciprocates before realizing it is inappropriate. She tries to force Billy to leave, but they are joined by Sam and Margot, who come to her with boy troubles. When Rachel consoles Sam after a poor date, Billy watches dejectedly. Exasperated, Billy finally leaves and slams the door, leaving the group in stunned silence.

The next morning, Billy passionately recites his monologue from Death of a Salesman. When Rachel congratulates him, he pulls her aside and explains he was thinking of her during his monologue and that he is off his medication. Realizing that the situation is out of control, Rachel calls the principal causing Billy to run off. Unable to reach the principal, Rachel runs into Walter, who advises her to stop caring about her students so much. Rachel returns to the awards ceremony where Billy wins second place. On the way home, things remain awkward between them until Margot reminds them that Billy has yet to take the makeup test for The Great Gatsby he was supposed to complete before attending the competition. The students devise a plan to answer questions from the test Margot has in her bag and use Sam's notebook. Billy takes the test and passes.

Back at the school, having driven all three kids back, Rachel suggests that Billy talk to his parents about his medication and allow them to take care of him. Billy tells Rachel she needs someone to take care of her as well. She sits in her car for a beat, then exits, and turns to approach Billy and his family with a smile.

== Cast ==
- Lily Rabe as Rachel Stevens
- Timothée Chalamet as William "Billy" Mitman
- Lili Reinhart as Margot Jensen
- Anthony Quintal as Sam
- Rob Huebel as Walter
- Oscar Nunez as Principal Albert Alvarez
- Grant Jordan as Trevor
- Tamir Yardenne as George

== Production ==
In February 2013, it was announced that Elliot Page would direct the film, which would have been his first as helmer, from a screenplay by Julia Hart, with Anna Faris attached to star as a teacher. In 2015, Julia Hart, who wrote the screenplay, replaced Page as director, in her directorial debut.

The film was produced by Gilbert Films and Anonymous Content, with Gary Gilbert and Jordan Horowitz producing in representation of Gilbert Films and Doug Wald producing in representation of Anonymous Content. Beachside's Michael B. Clarke and Alex Turtletaub co-produced. Nicole Romano and Trevor Adley were executive producers, representing Anonymous Content.

In May 2015, Anthony Quintal announced via his YouTube channel that he had been cast in the film. In an interview, Quintal later said that Julia Hart had approached him and said "I just know that you are perfect for this role. I have been looking for someone to play this role for so long. I came across you and your videos recently and thought, 'This is it. He is the one.'" In June 2015, it was announced that Lily Rabe, Timothée Chalamet, Lili Reinhart, and Rob Huebel had all been cast as well, with Rabe replacing Faris as the lead.

=== Filming ===
Production on the film began in May 2015, in Simi Valley, California, and concluded on June 22, 2015.

== Release ==
The film had its world premiere at SXSW on March 12, 2016. Shortly after, The Orchard acquired distribution rights to the film. The film began a limited release in theatres on September 16, 2016, before being streamed through video on demand on September 20, 2016.

=== Critical reception ===
Miss Stevens received positive reviews from film critics. It holds a 91% approval rating on review aggregator website Rotten Tomatoes, based on 23 reviews, with an average rating of 7.4/10. On Metacritic, the film holds a rating of 65 out of 100, based on 9 critics, indicating "generally favorable reviews".

Stephen Holden of The New York Times classified the film as an "NYT Critic's Pick", describing it as a "modest, warmhearted directorial debut..." He wrote that Rabe gave a "beautifully balanced performance".

=== Accolades ===
| Year | Festival | Category | Nominee | Result | Ref. |
|---|---|---|---|---|---|
| 2016 | SXSW Film Festival | Special Jury Award for Best Actress - Narrative Feature | Lily Rabe | Won | |
| 2016 | SXSW Film Festival | SXSW Grand Jury Award for Narrative Feature | Julia Hart | Nominated | |
| 2016 | SXSW Film Festival | SXSW Gamechanger Award | Julia Hart | Nominated | |
