= The Front Runner (soundtrack) =

The Front Runner (Original Motion Picture Soundtrack)

Film score by Rob Simonsen
- Released: November 2, 2018
- Recorded: 2018
- Genre: Film score
- Length: 31:38
- Label: Sony Classical
- Producer: Rob Simonsen

Rob Simonsen chronology
| Tully (2018) | The Front Runner (2018) | Captive State (2019) |

The Front Runner (Original Motion Picture Soundtrack) is the film score composed by Rob Simonsen to the 2018 film The Front Runner directed by Jason Reitman and stars Hugh Jackman, Vera Farmiga, J. K. Simmons, and Alfred Molina. The score was released by Sony Classical Records on November 2, 2018.

== Development ==
Rob Simonsen, who previously composed for Jason's Tully (2018) reteamed for The Front Runner. When Jason was editing on The Front Runner, they discussed about the music which he considered different from Tully. Simonsen saw few scenes from the film, which he thought "it was really exciting, and felt like he was pushing into new territory cinematically." He added that Jason had few clear ideas about what he wanted for music, discussing about the use of old jazz piano-based score and influences like Dave Brubeck and David Shire's score for The Conversation (1974) which Jason and Simonsen liked. Having studied jazz music in college, Simonsen was tasked to provide a score that was based on the jazz music scene and not an entirely jazz score.

Despite the 1980s setting, Jason did not want the score to sound past the 1970s and "tried to be mindful to keep a vintage sound". The accompanying sounds consisted of 1950s and 1970s, resulted in studying the microphones used in that era. Simonsen bought the Neumann M 49 microphones, from the Columbia 30th Street Studio, New York City, where the Miles Davis' studio album Kind of Blue (1959) was recorded. Much of the production emphasized on the mics and preamplifiers used for piano recordings and wanted to capture the spirit but feel modern in its musical approach.

As Shire's score for The Conservation has been referenced during discussions, he sketched the music based on the score for that film. For Hart's campaign, Simonsen used a combination of drums and other percussive instruments. He wanted the drummers to do improvisational passes and find the minimal moments that served as the basis for cues. This was half of the score, which used percussion and drums, while the remainder accompanied solo piano. Simonsen further added another layer of piano and percussion, timpani and bass drum, keeping it really focused. Simonsen played the piano at his studio. He added "A lot of repetitive, driving patterns with some overlaid chords that maybe bleed over into jazz, but never so much that it's a jazz score." Like Tully, Jason used Simonsen's cues into the edit that remained throughout the film.

Simonsen added that he "wasn’t necessarily working to picture, [but had] the picture to reference to see how the piece was playing to the film in general". Since Jason wanted the music to be handmade, which resulted in him writing the score away from picture. Both the director and composer wanted the score to not sound deliberate, adding "there were some things he cut in, and other things I did score that ended up that way, and other times I scored a scene, and he wouldn’t like it for that scene, but he loved it for another scene." Simonsen recalled on recording several hours and reworking on the cues, but Jason had liked the initial version which had flaws, over the best versions. Jason used a temp cue for a major sequence, which was the old jazz piece which was bluesy and for which that killed the overall tension of the film. Simonsen added that Jason did a masterful job of holding an objective point of view, where "it was always about keeping the tension going, without sounding like we were making tension music, or overly heroic or thematic or villainous or bad" which was a tricky prospect.

== Track listing ==
| No. | Title | Length |
|---|---|---|
| 1. | "Was Everest Not Available?" | 1:38 |
| 2. | "Can't Make Kentucky" | 2:08 |
| 3. | "Is There a Reason You Brought the Camera?" | 1:23 |
| 4. | "Axes" | 1:21 |
| 5. | "Stakeout" | 2:19 |
| 6. | "Overnight" | 6:45 |
| 7. | "There's Going to Be a Story" | 2:48 |
| 8. | "Turning" | 1:03 |
| 9. | "Donna" | 1:27 |
| 10. | "I'm an Idealist" | 3:21 |
| 11. | "Improv for Gary Hart" (feat. Lloyd Miller) | 3:42 |
| 12. | "Infidelity" | 3:43 |
| Total length: | | 31:38 |

== Reception ==
Michael Woodward of Psychologies called it "a wonderfully fresh and original score by Rob Simonsen". Peter Debruge of Variety and Allan Hunter of Screen International called it "dramatic" and "moving". LATF USA News called it a "peculiar percussive score"

== Personnel ==
Credits adapted from CD liner notes:

- Music composer and producer: Rob Simonsen
- Score recording engineer: Al Schmitt
- Score mixing engineer: Stan Neff
- Digital score recordists: Chandler Harrod
- Score mastering engineer: Stephen Hall
- Music editor: Nick South
- Assistant music editor: Victoria Ruggiero
- Music preparation: Mark Graham
- Music assistance: Taylor Lipari-Hassett
- Score consultant: Celeste Chada
- Music consultant: Eothen Alapatt, Ilyse Wolfe Tretter, Esq.
