= Jack Champion =

American actor (born 2004)

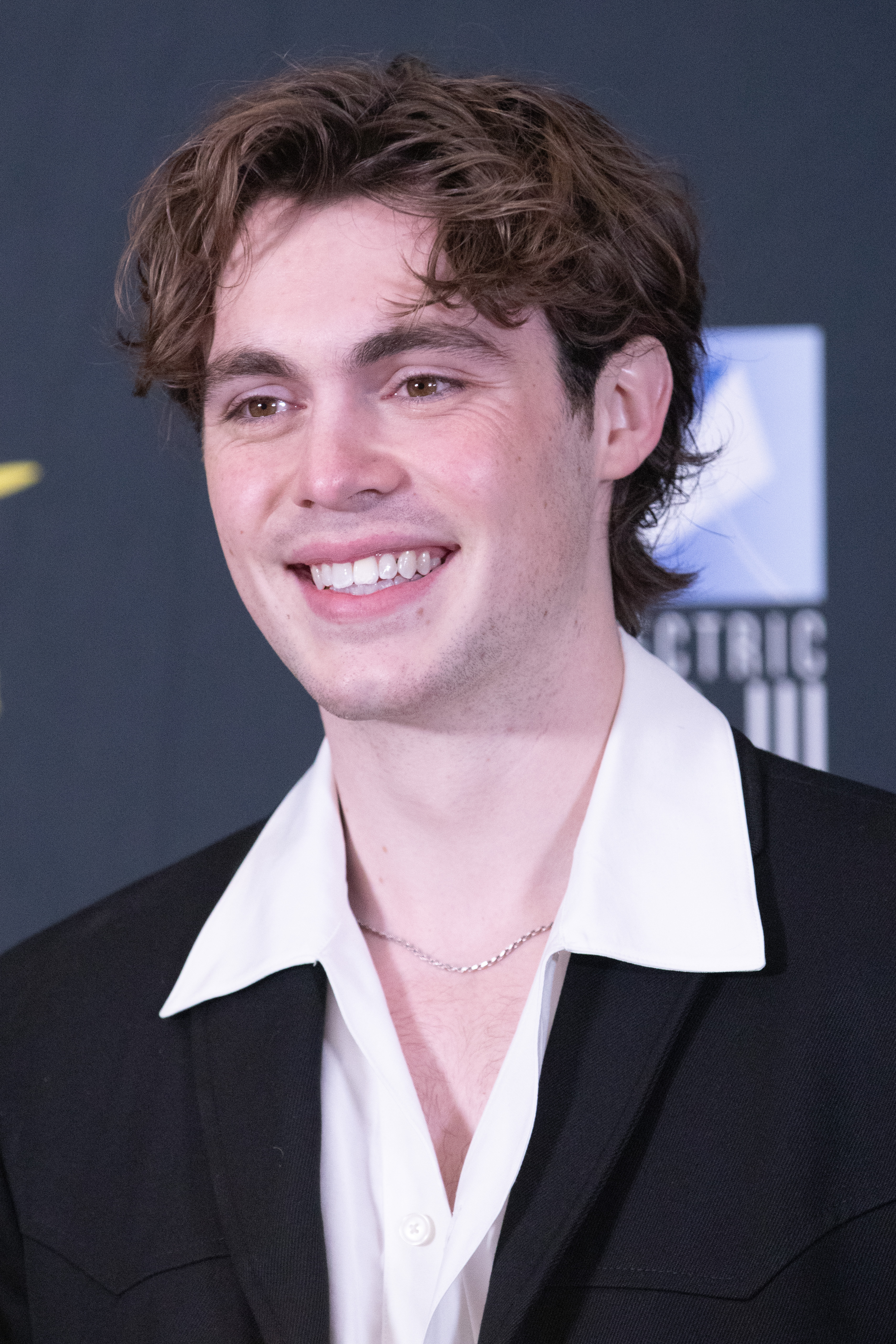
- Champion in 2026
- Born: Jackson Champion; November 16, 2004 (age 22); Blacksburg, Virginia, U.S.
- Occupation: Actor
- Years active: 2015–present

Jackson Champion (born November 16, 2004) is an American actor. He is best known for his role as Miles (Spider) Socorro in James Cameron's Avatar: The Way of Water (2022) and Avatar: Fire and Ash (2025). He also played Ethan Landry in the slasher film Scream VI (2023).

== Early life and career ==
Jack Champion was born on November 17, 2004 and is a native of Blacksburg, Virginia. He was raised by his mother, a microbiologist, and his father, a lawyer. He has credited his mother for encouraging his interest in acting. He began acting at age eight, starting in school theatre and eventually working in short films. In 2015, he had a small role in the documentary series American Genius.

In 2017, Champion booked a screen test to join the cast of James Cameron's science fiction film Avatar: The Way of Water. Before he was cast in the role, he filmed a small part in the superhero film Avengers: Endgame (2019) as a kid on a bicycle. He also had a leading role in the horror film The Night Sitter (2018). Champion booked his part in Avatar at age 12, after four months of extensive auditions. He was cast as Miles Socorro, a human teenager living amongst Na'vis on Pandora.

To prepare for the physically demanding role, Champion underwent two years of high-protein body transformation, gaining nearly 20 pounds of muscle, and trained extensively in free-diving, eventually reaching a personal breath-hold record of over four minutes underwater. The nature of Champion's role meant that he had to film all his scenes twice: once as a reference for his co-stars (including Sam Worthington, Zoe Saldaña, and Sigourney Weaver) and another to film in live-action. His work involved two years of performance capture on a soundstage, followed by two and a half years of live-action filming in New Zealand. After five years of production, the film was released in 2022, after Champion turned 18. It earned over $2 billion worldwide, becoming the third highest-grossing film of all time. Champion concurrently shot scenes for the sequel, Avatar: Fire and Ash, and portions of Avatar 4, primarily so that he would not age out of the role.

In 2023, Champion appeared alongside an ensemble cast in the slasher film Scream VI. In contrast to his experience on Avatar, he described filming Scream VI as a "really fun summer vacation". He then played the son of Liam Neeson's character in the action thriller Retribution, a remake of the 2015 Spanish film. Champion next appeared in Anna Boden and Ryan Fleck's 1980s-set action drama Freaky Tales, which premiered at the 2024 Sundance Film Festival.

In addition to future Avatar installments, Champion starred in the drama Everything's Going to Be Great and the action thriller Trap House.

== Filmography ==
=== Film ===
Key
†	Denotes films that have not yet been released

Year	Title	Role	Notes
2018	The Night Sitter	Kevin	
2019	Avengers: Endgame	Kid on Bike	
2022	Avatar: The Way of Water	Miles "Spider" Socorro	
2023	Scream VI	Ethan Landry	
2023	Retribution	Zach Turner	
2024	Freaky Tales	Lucid	
2025	Everything's Going to Be Great	Derrick Smart	
2025	Trap House	Cody Seale	
2025	Avatar: Fire and Ash	Miles "Spider" Socorro	
2026	Don't Say Good Luck	Jack Davis	
2029	Avatar 4 †	Miles "Spider" Socorro	Post-production
2031	Avatar 5 †	Miles "Spider" Socorro	Filming hiatus
TBA	My Boyfriend Is a Demon †	TBA	Post-production
TBA	Bad Influence †	TBA	Post-production
TBA	The One Before The One †	Steven	Post-production

=== Television ===
Jack Champion's television appearances
Year	Title	Role	Notes
2015	American Genius	Kid Blink	Episode: "Hearst vs. Pulitzer"
2015	Under the Dome	Aiden Tilden	Episode: "Redux"
2015	Evil Kin	Young John Reese	Documentary; Episode: "Reese Family"
2015, 2016	Legends & Lies	Jesse James Jr. / Group of boys	2 episodes
2017	Gone	Chris Hale	Episode: "Tiger"

== Awards and nominations ==
Year	Award	Category	Work	Result	Ref.
2024	Saturn Awards	Best Younger Actor in a Film	Avatar: The Way of Water	Nominated	
2026	Saturn Awards	Best Performance by a Younger Actor	Avatar: Fire and Ash	Won	
