= Saniyya Sidney =

American actress (born 2006)

- Born: October 30, 2006 (age 19); Los Angeles, California, U.S.
- Occupation: Actress
- Years active: 2012–present

Saniyya Sidney (/səˈnaɪə/; born October 30, 2006) is an American actress. Her accolades include nominations for three Black Reel Awards, two Critics' Choice Awards, an NAACP Image Award, and two Screen Actors Guild Awards.

Following independent and short film roles, Sidney earned recognition with the horror series American Horror Story: Roanoke (2016). Her breakthrough came with the period drama film Fences (2016), for which she received a nomination for the Screen Actors Guild Award for Outstanding Performance by a Cast in a Motion Picture. She appeared in the biographical film Hidden Figures (2016) and the superhero film Fast Color (2018), before earning praise for leading FOX's vampire drama The Passage (2019) and playing young Venus Williams in King Richard (2021). For the latter, she was nominated for the Black Reel Award for Best Breakthrough Performance and the Critics' Choice Movie Award for Best Young Performer.

== Career ==
Sidney began acting in 2012, starring in a minor role as Amity in the short horror film The Babysitters. She next made a guest appearance as Kizzy Waller in the miniseries Roots, and was soon cast in the horror television series American Horror Story: Roanoke in the recurring role of Flora Harris, which was her breakthrough role. Both were played in 2016. Sidney starred in the period drama film Fences as Raynell Maxson, and also starred in the biographical drama film Hidden Figures as Constance Johnson, both of which were released in December 2016. The films were critically acclaimed, and the former film earned her nominations for the Critics' Choice Movie Award for Best Acting Ensemble and the Screen Actors Guild Award for Outstanding Performance by a Cast in a Motion Picture.

Sidney next starred in the superhero film Fast Color as Lila, the daughter of Ruth, which had its world premiere at the South by Southwest film festival on March 10, 2018. The film attained a release in theaters the following year. In January 2019, Sidney was cast in the lead role of Amy Bellafonte in the fox series The Passage, for which her performance was critically acclaimed. The series was cancelled after one season. In the same year, she starred as Riley in the Netflix comedic special Kevin Hart's Guide to Black History, which was released in February.

Sidney appears in the 2021 biographical drama film King Richard as Venus Williams, a daughter of Richard Williams, alongside Will Smith. She had never played tennis prior to accepting the role and learned to play tennis in Venus' style, including playing right-handed when Sidney is left-handed. She earned critical acclaim for the role, with Variety magazine praising her for "handling both the dramatic and athletic dimensions of their characters across a span of approximately three years." She received several awards for her performance, including nominations for the Black Reel Award for Best Breakthrough Performance and the Critics' Choice Movie Award for Best Young Performer.

Sidney is set to appear in The First Lady for Showtime as Sasha Obama. In January 2022, Sidney was tapped to play Claudette Colvin in the drama film Spark, directed by Anthony Mackie, which is his directorial debut.

== Filmography ==
=== Film ===
| Year | Title | Role | Notes |
|---|---|---|---|
| 2012 | The Babysitters | Amity | Short film |
| 2016 | Fences | Raynell Maxson | |
| 2016 | Hidden Figures | Constance Johnson | |
| 2018 | Fast Color | Lila | |
| 2019 | Kevin Hart's Guide to Black History | Riley | Netflix special |
| 2021 | King Richard | Venus Williams | |
| 2027 | Children of Blood and Bone | | Post-production |

=== Television ===
| Year | Title | Role | Notes |
|---|---|---|---|
| 2016 | Roots | Kizzy Waller (age 6) | Episode: "Part 2" |
| 2016 | American Horror Story: Roanoke | Skye Richards (Flora Harris, re-enactement) | 4 episodes |
| 2019 | The Passage | Amy Bellafonte | Main role |
| 2022 | The First Lady | Sasha Obama | Recurring role |

== Awards and nominations ==
=== Solo awards ===
| Year | Award | Category | Work | Result | Ref |
|---|---|---|---|---|---|
| 2021 | Las Vegas Film Critics Society | Youth in Film - Female | King Richard | Nominated | |
| 2021 | Online Association of Female Film Critics | Breakthrough Performance | King Richard | Nominated | |
| 2021 | Washington D.C. Area Film Critics Association | Best Youth Performance | King Richard | Nominated | |
| 2022 | African-American Film Critics Association | Breakout Actor | King Richard | Won | |
| 2022 | Black Reel Awards | Breakthrough Performance - Female | King Richard | Nominated | |
| 2022 | Critics' Choice Movie Awards | Best Young Actor/Actress | King Richard | Nominated | |
| 2022 | Music City Film Critics Association | Best Young Actress | King Richard | Nominated | |
| 2022 | Online Film & Television Association | Best Youth Performance | King Richard | Nominated | |
| 2022 | San Diego Film Critics Society | Best Youth Performance | King Richard | Runner-up | |
| 2022 | Hollywood Film Critics Association | Star on the Rise Award | Herself | Won | |
| 2022 | Santa Barbara International Film Festival | Virtuoso Award | Herself | Won | |

=== Ensemble awards ===
| Year | Award | Category | Work | Result | Ref |
|---|---|---|---|---|---|
| 2016 | Critics' Choice Movie Awards | Best Acting Ensemble | Fences | Nominated | |
| 2016 | Washington D.C. Area Film Critics Association Awards | Best Ensemble | Fences | Nominated | |
| 2017 | Black Reel Awards | Outstanding Ensemble | Fences | Nominated | |
| 2017 | Screen Actors Guild Award | Outstanding Performance by a Cast in a Motion Picture | Fences | Nominated | |
| 2022 | Black Reel Awards | Outstanding Ensemble | King Richard | Nominated | |
| 2022 | NAACP Image Awards | Outstanding Ensemble Cast in a Motion Picture | King Richard | Nominated | |
| 2022 | Screen Actors Guild Awards | Outstanding Performance by a Cast in a Motion Picture | King Richard | Nominated | |
