= Starman =

Starman, Star Men, or variations, may refer generally to any space traveller, or more specifically to:

== People ==
- "Starman", onstage alter ego of Kiss frontman Paul Stanley
- Starman (wrestler) (born 1974), Mexican professional wrestler
- "Starman", also a nickname for David Bowie

== Places ==
- Starmen Point, Stresher Peninsula, Graham Coast, Antarctic Peninsula, Antarctica

== Literature ==
=== Books ===
- StarMan (Sara Douglass novel), a 1996 fantasy novel by Sara Douglass
- The Starmen, a 1952 science-fiction novel by Leigh Brackett
- Starman Jones, a 1953 novel by Robert A. Heinlein

=== Comics ===
- Starman (DC Comics), one of several comic book superheroes in the DC Comics universe. The most prominent are:
  - Starman (Ted Knight), the first Starman, a 1940s superhero and member of the Justice Society of America
  - Starman (Jack Knight), the seventh Starman, a 1990s superhero and son of the original
  - Thom Kallor, a member of the Legion of Super-Heroes also known as Starman and Star Boy

== Film ==
- Starman (1984 film), a science fantasy film starring Jeff Bridges and Karen Allen
  - Starman (TV series), 1986–87 television series (based on the 1984 film of the same name), starring Robert Hays and Christopher Daniel Barnes
- Super Giant, a 1950s Japanese superhero, called "Starman" in America
- Star Men, a 2015 UK documentary following a roadtrip in the US Southwest by British astronomers
- Starman (2025 film), a documentary directed and written by Robert Stone
- Starman (upcoming film), an upcoming science fiction thriller directed and written by Josh Wakely

== Music ==
- Starman (band), a British pop band
- "Starman" (song), a 1972 song by David Bowie, talking about his alter ego Ziggy Stardust.
- Starman, an illustration associated with the Rush album 2112

== Games ==
- Star Man, a Robot Master featured in Mega Man 5
- Starman (Mario), a star-shaped power-up in the Mario series of video games
- Starman (EarthBound), an enemy in the EarthBound series of video games
- Starman, a wrestler in the Nintendo Entertainment System game Pro Wrestling
- Starman, a high-performance preforking PSGI/Plack web server
- Starmen.net, a fan website for 1995 video game EarthBound

== Other uses ==
- AS Starman, an Estonian cable television, VOIP telephony, and ISP company
- Starman (Gwiazdor), a Polish Christmas gift-bringer, who brings presents in the regions of Lubusz Land, Greater Poland, Kuyavia, Western Pomerania, and Kashubia.
- Starman, a mannequin dressed in a spacesuit seated on board Elon Musk's Tesla Roadster that was launched into heliocentric orbit during the Falcon Heavy test flight.
- Starman (horse), a racehorse

== See also ==
- Alien (disambiguation)
- Extraterrestrial intelligence
- Extraterrestrial (disambiguation)
- Spaceman (disambiguation)
- Star (disambiguation)
- Man (disambiguation)
- Airman
- Starboy (disambiguation)
- Stargirl (disambiguation)
