= Marsha Stephanie Blake =

American actress

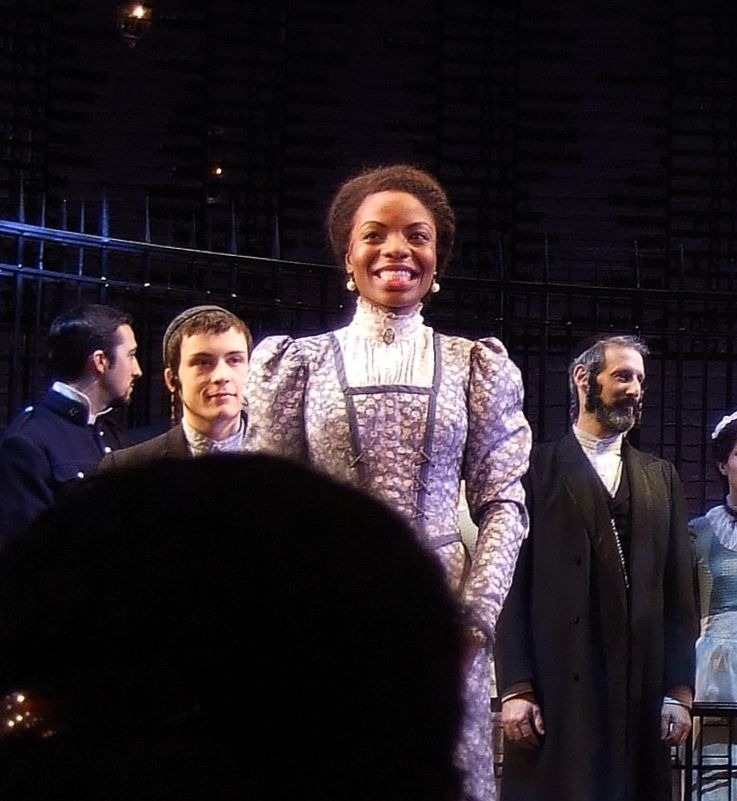
- Blake in production of The Merchant of Venice (2010)
- Born: 3 May 1974 (age 52); Jamaica
- Education: Dartmouth College; University of California, San Diego (MFA)
- Occupation: Actress
- Years active: 2002–present
- Children: 1

Marsha Stephanie Blake (born 3 May 1974) is a Jamaican American actress. She is best known for her role as Linda McCray in the Netflix miniseries When They See Us, for which she was nominated for the Primetime Emmy Award for Outstanding Supporting Actress in a Limited Series or Movie.

== Life and career ==
Blake was born in Jamaica and emigrated to the United States in the late 1980s with her family. She attended Dartmouth College and graduated in 1996. She received an MFA from the graduate acting program at UCSD.

Blake has played many roles on Broadway and Off-Broadway productions, including The Merchant of Venice, Come and Gone, The Crucible, An Octoroon, and Hurt Village. On television, she guest-starred in Law & Order, Law & Order: Special Victims Unit, Third Watch, Elementary, and The Good Wife.

In 2015, Blake joined the cast of the Netflix comedy-drama series Orange Is the New Black playing Berdie Rogers. Along with the cast, she received the Screen Actors Guild Award for Outstanding Performance by an Ensemble in a Comedy Series. She also had recurring roles on Happyish, Getting On and The Blacklist. In 2019, Blake played Linda McCray in the Netflix miniseries When They See Us directed by Ava DuVernay. Later in 2019, Blake was cast as Vivian Maddox in How to Get Away with Murder for the sixth and final season, and in fourth season of This Is Us opposite her When They See Us co-star, Asante Blackk.

Blake also has appeared in a number of movies, including The Architect (2006), Stand Clear of the Closing Doors (2013), Nasty Baby (2015), Person to Person (2017), Crown Heights (2017), The Wilde Wedding (2017), Luce (2019), See You Yesterday (2019), The Laundromat (2019), and I'm Your Woman (2020). She received a Canadian Screen Award nomination for Best Supporting Performance in a Film at the 11th Canadian Screen Awards in 2023, for her performance as Ruth in the drama film Brother.

== Filmography ==
=== Film ===
Year	Title	Role	Notes
2003	A-Alike	Jada	Short film
2006	The Architect	Missy Neeley	
2007	Lifted	Nadine	Short film
2012	Django Unchained	House Slave	Deleted scene
2013	Stand Clear of the Closing Doors	Carmen	
2014	The Story of Milo & Annie	Shirley	Short film
2015	Nasty Baby	Mo's Sister / Haimy	
2015	Our Nation	Margaret	
2017	Person to Person	Janet	
2017	Crown Heights	Briana	
2017	Imitation Girl	Karen	
2017	The Wilde Wedding	Officer Brady	
2019	Luce	Rosemary Wilson	
2019	Goldie	Carol	
2019	See You Yesterday	Phaedra	
2019	The Laundromat	Vincelle Boncamper	
2020	The Photograph	Violet Eames	
2020	An American Pickle	Inspector Sanders	
2020	I'm Your Woman	Teri	
2022	Brother	Ruth	Nominated — Canadian Screen Award for Best Supporting Performance in a Film; Nominated — Vancouver Film Critics Circle Award for Best Supporting Actress in a Canadian Film

=== Television ===
Year	Title	Role	Notes
2002	Third Watch	Myrna Addison	Episode: "Cold Front"
2004	Law & Order: Special Victims Unit	Maria	Episode: "Outcry"
2005	Law & Order	Clinic Doctor	Episode: "Locomotion"
2006	Six Degrees	Nanny	Episode: "Pilot"
2011	The Big C	Vampire Nurse	Episode: "Boo!"
2011	A Gifted Man	Kelly Jones	2 episodes
2013	Elementary	Melanie Cullen	Episode: "M."
2014	Girls	Publisher	Episode: "Only Child"
2014	Chicago P.D.	Janice Watkins	Episode: "Prison Ball"
2015	Orange Is the New Black	Berdie Rogers	8 episodes Screen Actors Guild Award for Outstanding Performance by an Ensemble in a Comedy Series
2015	Happyish	Michelle	4 episodes
2015	Public Morals	Tina	Episode: "Collection Day"
2015	The Good Wife	Maia Sachs	Episode: "Taxed"
2015	Getting On	Yvette Ortley	3 episodes
2016–2019	The Blacklist	Janet MacNamara	2 episodes
2018	Quantico	Leslie Thomas	Episode: "Bullet Train"
2019	When They See Us	Linda McCray	Miniseries; Black Reel Award for Outstanding Supporting Actress, TV Movie/Limited Series; Online Film Critics Society Award for Best Ensemble in a Motion Picture or Limited Series; African-American Film Critics Association Award for Best Ensemble; Nominated – Primetime Emmy Award for Outstanding Supporting Actress in a Limited Series or Movie; Nominated – Critics' Choice Television Award for Best Supporting Actress in a Movie/Miniseries
2019–2020	How to Get Away with Murder	Vivian Maddox	5 episodes
2019	This Is Us	Kelly Hodges	2 episodes
2020	FBI: Most Wanted	Denise Tyson	Episode: "Defender"
2022	The Last Days of Ptolemy Grey	Niecie	Main role
2023	Wilderness	Detective Rawlings	3 episodes
2024	Fight Night: The Million Dollar Heist	Delores Hudson	Miniseries
2024	The Madness	Elena Daniels	Recurring
