= Retribution (2023 film) =

Film by Nimród Antal

- Theatrical release poster
- Directed by: Nimród Antal
- Screenplay by: Chris Salmanpour
- Based on: El desconocido by Alberto Marini
- Produced by: Andrew Rona; Alex Heineman; Jaume Collet-Serra; Juan Sola
- Starring: Liam Neeson; Noma Dumezweni; Lilly Aspell; Jack Champion; Embeth Davidtz; Matthew Modine
- Cinematography: Flavio Labiano
- Edited by: Steven Mirkovich
- Music by: Harry Gregson-Williams
- Production companies: The Picture Company; Ombra Films; TF1 Films Production; Studio Babelsberg
- Distributed by: Lionsgate Roadside Attractions (United States); StudioCanal (France); Tripictures (Spain)
- Release dates: August 23, 2023 (France); August 25, 2023 (United States)
- Running time: 90 minutes
- Countries: France; Germany; Spain; United States
- Language: English
- Budget: $20 million
- Box office: $18.7 million

Retribution is a 2023 action thriller film directed by Nimród Antal and written by Chris Salmanpour. The film stars Liam Neeson, Noma Dumezweni, Lilly Aspell, Jack Champion, Embeth Davidtz and Matthew Modine. It is the third remake of the 2015 Spanish film El desconocido, which follows a man (Neeson) and his two children who are trapped in his car after receiving a threat that it will explode if he exits the vehicle.

An international co-production of France, Germany, Spain and the United States, Retribution was released in France on August 23, 2023 by StudioCanal, and in the United States on August 25 by Lionsgate and Roadside Attractions.

== Plot ==
Matt Turner works as a financier at Nanite Capital under his friend and CEO Anders Muller and lives with his wife, Heather, and two children, Emily and Zach, in Berlin. While driving his children to school, Matt receives a call from an unknown number with a distorted voice who says that there is a bomb under his seat, which was already armed when Matt sat on it. The bomb is triggered by both pressure plates placed on all the seats and a radio frequency. He also threatens to detonate the bomb if Matt tries to get help. Matt finds the device and is forced to follow the caller's instructions in order to keep them alive.

The caller forces Matt to watch Sylvain, Matt’s client who is also receiving a bomb threat, being killed in an explosion when Sylvain’s panicked girlfriend attempts to escape. The bomber tells Matt to call Heather to retrieve €50,000 from his safety deposit box at the bank and deliver it to him. After Heather retrieves it, the caller changes the plan by telling her to give the money to a man in a blue suit. When she does, the police arrive and arrest the man.

After seeing the news implicating Matt for the bombing, Europol agent Angela Brickmann calls him; Matt tries to convince her of his innocence and requests that cellular signals be jammed to prevent the remote trigger. The caller learns that Matt and Anders have deposited €208 million slush fund from the clients into Matt’s "emergency collateral account" in a bank in Dubai. He arranges for Matt to meet Anders at a power plant. Arriving there, the caller forces Matt to order Anders to liquidate his collateral account. Despite Anders reluctantly complying, the caller orders Matt to kill Anders with a revolver in exchange for his life and his children. Matt refuses and Anders’s car explodes; the shrapnel injures Emily’s leg.

Matt is eventually surrounded by the police with Angela and Heather arriving at the scene. Once they realize that the pressure plate is only located under Matt's seat, the bomb squad safely removes Zach and Emily, who is treated for her injuries. Interrogating Matt, Angela suspects the bombing might be related to the heist. After talking to Heather for the last time, Matt drives away and evades the police, determined to find the caller by himself. Matt demands the caller to meet him in person if he wants the money.

The caller is revealed to be Anders. Anders reveals that he committed the bombings to cover up his tracks of embezzling €208 million wired into his untraceable crypto account. He shows an audio recording of Matt's earlier conversation with him, intending to pin the blame on Matt for the terrorist attacks. When Anders demands Matt call the bank one last time, Matt speeds up his car, despite being pointed by Anders at gunpoint, and deliberately crashes it on the side of a bridge. Anders attempts to reach the remote trigger but Matt unlocks his seat belt and falls into the river, allowing the bomb to activate and kill Anders. Angela and the police arrive at the scene where she nods at Matt, allowing him to walk free.

During the credits, the news reports state that the bombings were part of the heist perpetrated by Anders, and Matt cooperates with Europol to resolve the incident.

== Cast ==
- Liam Neeson as Matt Turner
- Noma Dumezweni as Angela Brickmann, an Europol Agent
- Lilly Aspell as Emily Turner, Matt and Heather's younger daughter
- Jack Champion as Zach Turner, Matt and Heather's teenage son
- Arian Moayed as Sylvain
- Embeth Davidtz as Heather Turner, Matt's wife
- Matthew Modine as Anders Muller, Matt's friend and boss

== Production ==
Retribution is an American, French, German and Spanish co-production by StudioCanal and Studio Babelsberg Motion Pictures. It was shot mainly at Babelsberg Studios in Potsdam and in the streets of Berlin, where the story takes place.

Originally announced in 2017, Neeson was confirmed to be starring in November 2020. In May 2021, it was announced that Champion and Aspell were cast to portray the son and daughter respectively of Neeson's character. In June 2021, it was announced that Modine, Davidtz and Moayed were cast in the film. In July 2021, Deadline Hollywood reported that Modine completed his scenes that were filmed in Germany. The film's score was composed by Harry Gregson-Williams.

== Release ==
In November 2022, Lionsgate Films acquired the distribution rights to the film for the United States, Canada and India from StudioCanal and The Picture Company, later collaborating with Roadside Attractions in the aforementioned territories and PVR Inox Pictures in India under a later deal to release the film. The film was released in France on August 23, 2023, and was released in the United States on August 25, 2023. It was released in the United Kingdom and Ireland on October 13, 2023. Likewise, an October 27, 2023 date was scheduled for the film's release in Spanish theatres.

=== Home media ===
Retribution was released through premium video on demand in the United States on September 15, 2023. It was later released on Blu-ray on October 31, 2023.

== Reception ==
=== Box office ===
Retribution has grossed $6.9 million in the United States and Canada, and $11.8 million in other territories, for a worldwide total of $18.7 million.

In the United States and Canada, Retribution was released alongside Gran Turismo, The Hill, and Golda, and was projected to gross $2–3 million from 1,750 theaters in its opening weekend. The film made $1.3 million on its first day, and went on to debut to $3.3 million, finishing eighth.

=== Critical response ===
On the review aggregator website Rotten Tomatoes, 28% of 92 critics' reviews are positive, with an average rating of 4.6/10. The website's consensus reads: "Retribution may prove mildly diverting for hardcore fans of films depicting Liam Neeson as a parent in peril, but in most respects, this thriller is strictly standard stuff." Metacritic, which uses a weighted average, assigned the film a score of 43 out of 100, based on 26 critics, indicating "mixed or average" reviews. Audiences surveyed by CinemaScore gave the film an average grade of "C" on an A+ to F scale, while those polled at PostTrak gave it a 54% overall positive score.

In a mixed review for Vulture, Bilge Ebiri stated that "Neeson’s action movies often turn on his characters’ anxieties as a father and/or husband — sublimating his own tragic personal history into the realm of fictional motivation." and that, "Most of Retribution consists of three shots: a close-up of Matt, a close-up of his daughter, and a close-up of his son. But out of these simple building blocks and this nothing script, Antal extracts plenty of suspense and even emotion".

Noel Murray, in the Los Angeles Times, found "The script is too flatly functional, weighed down by periodic info dumps where various people try to explain how Matt’s floundering business might connect to his current predicament.", adding that "Liam Neeson has done so many variations on the “angry dad” action hero that we can start dividing those movies into sub-genres." and that "While Retribution is far from Neeson’s best, it still mostly works, so long as you tune out the dialogue and focus on the hero’s twitchy face, waiting to see which will blow to smithereens first: his car or his patience".
