= Jordan Horowitz =

American film producer

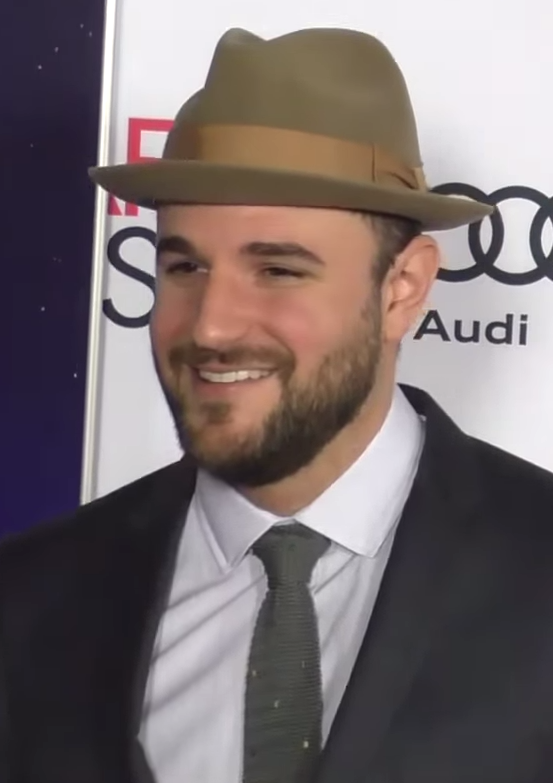
- Horowitz in 2016
- Born: April 10, 1980 (age 46); Westchester, New York, United States
- Education: Northwestern University
- Occupation: Film producer
- Spouse: Julia Hart
- Children: 2

Jordan Horowitz (born April 10, 1980) is an American film producer. He is best known for producing the musical romantic-drama film La La Land that earned numerous awards and nominations including a nomination for the Academy Award for Best Picture with producers Marc Platt and Fred Berger.

== Early life and education ==
Horowitz was raised in Westchester County, New York. He is of Jewish descent. In 2002, he graduated from Northwestern University in Evanston, Illinois.

== Academy Awards incident ==
At the 89th Academy Awards, presenters Faye Dunaway and Warren Beatty announced that La La Land was the winner of Best Picture. However, they had mistakenly been given the envelope for Best Actress, a category in which Emma Stone had won for her role in La La Land several minutes prior. When the mistake was realized, Horowitz rushed to the microphone to announce Moonlight as the correct winner, taking the card from Warren Beatty to show to the audience and then presented the Oscar to the winning producers. This occurred after PricewaterhouseCoopers representatives appeared on stage to discuss the mistake with the team from La La Land and Warren Beatty.

== Personal life ==
Horowitz is married to Julia Hart, who is a Hollywood writer and director, known for The Keeping Room (2014), Miss Stevens (2016) and Fast Color (2018). They have two children together.

== Filmography ==
Producer

- 2010: The Kids Are All Right
- 2010: Meet Monica Velour
- 2012: Save the Date
- 2013: Are You Here
- 2014: The Keeping Room
- 2016: Miss Stevens
- 2016: The Cleanse
- 2016: Little Boxes
- 2016: La La Land
- 2018: Fast Color (Also co-writer)
- 2020: Stargirl (Also co-writer)
- 2020: Adam
- 2020: I'm Your Woman (Also co-writer)
- 2022: Hollywood Stargirl (Also co-writer)
- 2026: Don't Say Good Luck (Also co-writer)

Executive producer

- 2012: The Garden of Eden
- 2018: Counterpart
