= Fast Color =

2018 film directed by Julia Hart

- Theatrical release poster
- Directed by: Julia Hart
- Written by: Julia Hart; Jordan Horowitz
- Produced by: Jordan Horowitz; Mickey Liddell; Pete Shilaimon
- Starring: Gugu Mbatha-Raw; Lorraine Toussaint; Saniyya Sidney; Christopher Denham; David Strathairn
- Cinematography: Michael Fimognari
- Edited by: Martin Pensa
- Music by: Rob Simonsen
- Production companies: LD Entertainment; Original Headquarters
- Distributed by: Lionsgate; Codeblack Films
- Release dates: March 10, 2018 (SXSW); April 19, 2019 (United States)
- Running time: 102 minutes
- Country: United States
- Language: English
- Box office: $76,916

Fast Color is a 2018 American superhero drama film directed by Julia Hart from a screenplay by Hart and Jordan Horowitz. Horowitz produced the film along with Mickey Lidell and Pete Shilaimon. It stars Gugu Mbatha-Raw, Lorraine Toussaint, Saniyya Sidney, Christopher Denham and David Strathairn, and tells the story of Ruth (Mbatha-Raw), a woman with supernatural powers on the run from law enforcement and scientists who want to study and control her.

The project was announced in January 2017, along with Mbatha-Raw's casting and that LD Entertainment would be fully financing the project. Principal photography began on March 13, 2017 in New Mexico and lasted for 28 days.

The film had its world premiere at South by Southwest on March 10, 2018. It was released on April 19, 2019, by Lionsgate and Codeblack Films. The film received positive reviews from critics with praise directed at Mbatha-Raw's performance and its uniqueness compared to other superhero films, but with criticism aimed at the script.

A television series based on the film is in development at Amazon Studios, with Viola Davis' JuVee Productions producing, and with the film's original writers returning to script the show.

== Plot ==
In the future American Midwest, where it has not rained for eight years, Ruth is a homeless wanderer whose seizures trigger supernatural earthquakes. As she travels to her old family home, she meets Bill, a diner customer who is actually a scientist attempting to capture Ruth for study. Bill tricks her into accepting a ride with him then attempts to draw blood samples from her, but Ruth wounds him and flees in the direction of her home. Bill is forced to seek medical aid, abandoning his vehicle, which catches the attention of the local sheriff, Ellis.

Arriving at the home, Ruth reunites with her mother Bo, who has the ability to telekinetically disintegrate objects, reassemble them, and see vibrant flashes known as "the colors". Lila mentions it's also like an after effect. Bo has been taking care of Ruth's daughter Lila, who has the same powers as Bo and has no memories of her mother. After Ruth accidentally sets off another earthquake, Lila is introduced to her and they explain that Ruth's powers deteriorated in her childhood, becoming destructive and causing her to abandon her family.

Lila and Bo attempt to train Ruth on reconnecting with her old powers, while the scientist and the sheriff investigate Ruth's trail. When Ellis discerns Ruth is back home, he covertly signals Bo, his longtime friend and lover, to warn her about the scientist that is searching for their daughter. The next morning, Bill begins heading for the women's house, and Ruth takes off in the family truck to escape him, leaving Bo and Lila behind. When she exits miles later for gasoline, her seizures return. Ruth relives the memory of her nearly drowning her then-infant daughter during a past episode, and then of saving her life, emotionally healing and causing the sky to rain again.

Ruth returns home, where Ellis informs her that Bill and his accomplices kidnapped Lila. Ruth goes to rescue her, followed by Ellis and Bo. At the sheriff's office where Lila is being held, Ruth creates a storm and panics Bill and his guards. After disintegrating their weapons and freeing Lila in a show of power, Bo offers herself to the scientists in exchange for Lila, who is reunited with her mother. The two escape in the truck, and find a note from Bo telling them to head for Rome to find another woman that she used to know with powers.

== Cast ==
- Gugu Mbatha-Raw as Ruth
- Lorraine Toussaint as Bo
- Saniyya Sidney as Lila, Ruth's daughter
- Christopher Denham as Bill
- David Strathairn as Ellis

== Production ==
In January 2017, it was announced Gugu Mbatha-Raw had joined the cast of the film, with Julia Hart directing, from a screenplay written by Hart and Jordan Horowitz. Horowitz, Mickey Liddell and Pete Shilaimon will produce under their Original Headquarters and LD Entertainment banners, respectively. In March 2017, Lorraine Toussaint, David Strathairn, Saniyya Sidney, and Christopher Denham joined the cast of the film.

=== Filming ===
Principal photography began in New Mexico on March 13, 2017 and lasted for 28 days.

== Release ==
The film had its world premiere at South by Southwest on March 10, 2018. Shortly after, Codeblack Films acquired distribution rights to the film and set it for a March 29, 2019, release. It was then pushed back to April 19, 2019, with Lionsgate now distributing the film from Codeblack Films.

=== Critical reception ===
On Rotten Tomatoes, the film has an approval rating of 83% based on 88 reviews, and an average rating of 6.8/10. The website's critic consensus states: "A grounded superhero story with more on its mind than punching bad guys, Fast Color leaps over uneven execution with a singular Gugu Mbatha-Raw performance." On Metacritic the film has a weighted average score of 64% based on reviews from 20 critics, indicating "generally favorable" reviews.

Richard Roeper of the Chicago Sun-Times gave the film 3 1/2 out of 4 stars and praised Mbatha-Raw for her performance, and director Julia Hart for "genuinely moving drama, an engrossing, supernatural-sci-fi mystery and some pretty darn impressive special effects." Sheri Linden of The Hollywood Reporter wrote: "Hart has fashioned a tale of matriarchal inheritance, but one whose fierce message is undercut rather than deepened by its child's-book clarity. The intriguing setup receives underpowered execution, the intended jolts landing all too softly." Amy Nicholson of Variety wrote: "Ultimately, Fast Color's thesis is more inspirational than the film, which often seems like it, too, is struggling to swirl itself into something more solid. Instead, its magical sparks don’t quite congeal as the audience can’t help hoping a movie this empathetic and unusual reaches transcendence".

== Television series ==
As of 2019, a TV series based on the film was in development at Amazon Studios. The show was set to be produced by Viola Davis and Julius Tennon's company JuVee Productions, with the return of the film's writers Julia Hart and Jordan Horowitz. However, as of February 2026, no such series has materialized.

== See also ==
- List of black films of the 2010s
- List of Afrofuturist films
