= Stargirl (film) =

2020 musical film by Julia Hart

- Official release poster
- Directed by: Julia Hart
- Screenplay by: Kristin Hahn; Julia Hart; Jordan Horowitz
- Based on: Stargirl by Jerry Spinelli
- Produced by: Kristin Hahn; Ellen Goldsmith-Vein; Lee Stollman; Jordan Horowitz
- Starring: Grace VanderWaal; Graham Verchere
- Cinematography: Bryce Fortner
- Edited by: Shayar Bansali; Tracey Wadmore-Smith
- Music by: Rob Simonsen
- Production companies: Walt Disney Pictures; Gotham Group; Hahnscape Entertainment
- Distributed by: Disney+
- Release date: March 13, 2020
- Running time: 107 minutes
- Country: United States
- Language: English

Stargirl is a 2020 American jukebox musical romance film based on the 2000 novel of the same name by Jerry Spinelli that debuted on Disney+. The film explores the tense emotions, non-conformity and self-expression of teenagers in high school, and the exuberance of first love.

The film was directed by Julia Hart, produced by Kristin Hahn, Ellen Goldsmith-Vein, Lee Stollman and Jordan Horowitz from a screenplay written by Hahn, Hart and Horowitz, and stars Grace VanderWaal and Graham Verchere. The film was released on March 13, 2020. The film received mostly positive reviews from critics, who praised Hart's direction and the nostalgic tone.

A sequel, Hollywood Stargirl, was released on June 3, 2022.

== Plot ==
Leo Borlock, a teenager in Mica, Arizona, wears a porcupine tie in remembrance of his late father. On each birthday, he receives a new porcupine tie from an unknown person. In high school, Leo plays trumpet in the marching band and helps his friend Kevin Singh, a member of the A.V. club, host an interview show. The free-spirited Stargirl Caraway makes an impression on Leo and later performs for their losing football team, the Mudfrogs. Kevin and Leo invite her onto their show, but she politely declines.

Stargirl becomes a good luck charm for the football team and begins hanging out with Leo and tries to get him to come out of his shell. Archie, the owner of the local paleontologist camp, tells Leo everything about Stargirl, who also learned about Leo through Archie. Later, Stargirl tries out for the Speech regionals against Kevin and wins with an unusual speech on rats before denying any knowledge of returning a bike to a boy who was in the hospital. Stargirl and Leo kiss for the first time and begin dating.

During the big game, Stargirl rides with an injured opposing player to the hospital, upsetting everyone, leading to the team's loss and causing Stargirl to lose her popularity. Leo's friends are upset, but they forgive him. The situation escalates after an interview of Stargirl on Kevin's show goes horribly wrong. Leo suggests that she act like everyone else, much to her consternation, she starts calling herself Susan and wearing clothes like those of her classmates. At the Speech regionals, Leo asks Stargirl to the Winter Dance, and she accepts. She is about to give a speech on internet privacy, but shifts to a speech on flowers, which wins her first place. Although it is the very first trophy won at the school, nobody pays attention to it. As he begins losing hope, Leo gets encouragement from his mother and Kevin.

Stargirl sends Leo her collection of records, a record player and an invite for a "big surprise" at the dance. When Leo arrives, Stargirl reveals her surprise: him singing in front of everyone. Leo reluctantly gets up and performs his and his father's favorite song, "Just What I Needed", leading everyone to dance in the courtyard. Afterwards, Leo discovers that Stargirl has moved away, but even after graduating high school, Leo never forgets what Stargirl did for him.

== Cast ==
- Grace VanderWaal as Susan "Stargirl" Caraway
- Graham Verchere as Leo Borlock
  - Enzo Charles de Angelis as Leo age 8
- Karan Brar as Kevin Singh, Leo's best friend
  - Atharva Varma as Kevin age 8
- Maximiliano Hernández as Mr. Robineau
- Darby Stanchfield as Gloria Borlock, Leo's mother
- Giancarlo Esposito as Archie Brubaker, Leo's mentor
- Collin Blackford as Benny Burrito
- Annacheska Brown as Tess Reid
- Shelby Simmons as Hillari Kimble
- Allison Wentworth as Dori Dilson
- Juliocesar Chavez as Alan Ferko
- Artemis as Mallory Franklin
- Julia Flores as Summer
- Gabriella Surodjawan as Kim
- John Apolinar as Wayne Parnell
- Alex James as Zack James
- Lucinda Marker as Principal Sutters
- Sara Arrington as Ana Caraway, Stargirl's mother
- Damian O'Hare as Leo's father

== Production ==
=== Development ===
On July 15, 2015, it was announced that Catherine Hardwicke was set to direct an adaptation of Jerry Spinelli's novel Stargirl for Walt Disney Pictures. The novel was initially adapted by Kristin Hahn who was also set to produce the film. Production companies involved were expected to include Gotham Group and BCDF Pictures, with the latter also financing the film.

On February 8, 2018, it was announced that a new iteration of the screenplay had been developed, Hardwicke would be replaced by Julia Hart as director, and the film would be produced by Walt Disney Pictures. The film would premiere on Disney+, Disney's streaming service that launched in late 2019. The following month, it was confirmed that the production was in the late stages of development, that Hahn's screenplay was still being used, and that she would continue to produce alongside Ellen Goldsmith-Vein and Lee Stollman. Production companies were to include Gotham Group and Hahn's company Hahnscape Entertainment. By June 2018, Hart had polished Hahn's script with her husband Jordan Horowitz, who also served as an executive producer.

=== Casting ===
In 2015, it was announced that the film would star Joey King as Stargirl and Charlie Plummer as Leo, the boy who narrates the story. By June 2018, however, VanderWaal had been cast to star, in her debut acting role, as Stargirl. By August 2018, Verchere had been cast as Leo. By September 2018, Esposito, Brar, Stanchfield and Hernández had been cast in supporting roles.

=== Filming ===
Filming was originally scheduled to commence in the fall of 2015 in New Mexico. Principal photography was delayed, however, until September 2018 and wrapped on November 16, 2018. Filming locations in the state included Albuquerque and Truth or Consequences.

== Release ==
Stargirl was released in the United States on March 13, 2020, by Disney+.

The film was removed from Disney+ on May 26, 2023. It was released on VOD platforms including Amazon Prime Video, Google Play and Vudu on September 26, 2023.

== Reception ==
=== Viewership ===
According to ScreenEngine/ASI, Stargirl was the 23rd-most-watched straight-to-streaming title of 2020, as of November 2020.

=== Critical response ===
On Rotten Tomatoes, the film holds an approval rating of 68%, based on 41 reviews, with an average rating of 6.20/10. The website's critical consensus reads, "Stargirl's feel-good story hits familiar coming-of-age beats, but self-assured performances and an earnest mission worn proudly make it a tune worth listening to." On Metacritic, the film has a weighted average score of 61 out of 100, based on 13 critics, indicating "generally favorable reviews".

Jason Bailey of The New York Times praised the screenplay for overcoming some of the clichés in the original novel, the development of the characters, and how the movie promotes self-worth and authenticity through Grace VanderWaal's character. Pete Hammond of Deadline Hollywood gave the film a favorable review. He complimented the performances of both VanderWaal and Verchere and called the movie "sweet and smart." Courtney Howard, in Variety, praised the principal performances: "[VanderWaal] ropes us into the mystery of her character reveal with heaping amounts of magnetism and grounded authenticity. It's no surprise that the music-driven scenes really showcase her power. ... She and Verchere, who's a genuinely sweet cross between Jessie [sic] Eisenberg and Michael Cera sharing the physicality and vocal tonalities of each, are a remarkable pairing." She also commented that "Hart and her collaborators adeptly utilize the textural language of cinema to heighten and underline thematic ties." Jennifer Green of Common Sense Media rated the movie 3 out of 5 stars and praised the film for promoting positive role models and positive values, such as integrity and acceptance. Jude Dry of IndieWire gave the movie a B rating; praised the adaptation, direction and VanderWaal and the rest of the performances, as well as the costume and production designs. Sheila O'Malley from RogerEbert.com gave the movie 2 out of 4 stars. She criticized VanderWaal's performance and complained that numerous aspects of the film, mostly centering around Leo's and Stargirl's relationship, did not make sense. However, she praised the visual appearance of the film as well as its message.

=== Accolades ===
The movie received a nomination for Best Music Supervision for Television Movie at the 2021 Guild of Music Supervisors Awards. CBR.com ranked Stargirl 6th in their "10 Best Disney+ Original Movies" list. Collider included the film in their "Best Original Movies on Disney Plus" list.

== Sequel ==
A sequel, Hollywood Stargirl, was released on June 3, 2022, on Disney+. Hart returned as director, and VanderWaal reprised her role as Stargirl. Judy Greer replaced Arrington as Ana, Stargirl's mother, and Elijah Richardson played Evan, the romantic lead. Uma Thurman portrayed Roxanne Martel, a musician that Stargirl admires; Hart and Horowitz wrote the screenplay. Judd Hirsch and Tyrel Jackson Williams played, respectively, Mr. Mitchell, Stargirl's new neighbor, and Terrell, Evan's older brother, an aspiring filmmaker. The story follows Stargirl and her mother Ana, who is hired as the costume designer on a movie, as they relocate to Los Angeles, where Stargirl meets new friends, explores her creative side and begins to gain success as a performer.
