= Laura Hankin =

American writer and actress

- Education: Princeton University
- Occupations: Novelist; screenwriter; actress
- Website: www.laurahankin.com

Laura Hankin is an American novelist, screenwriter, and actress.

== Biography ==
Hankin graduated from Princeton University in 2010.

Hankin performs and writes sketch comedy for the group Feminarchy. She has contributed articles to HuffPost, McSweeney's, and Medium.

Hankin's debut novel, Happy and You Know It (Berkley, 2020), was positively received by Kirkus Reviews: "Hankin manages to make overused subject matter feel fresh and vibrant. What starts out as a satire of privileged parenting quickly becomes something else entirely—a domestic thriller with twists and turns that are entirely unexpected and incredibly fun".

Hankin's second novel, A Special Place for Women (Berkley, 2021), was reviewed by Publishers Weekly as being "diverting if far-fetched". Publishers also said, "the narrative has a couple of nice twists, but the ending’s a bit of a stretch". Paramount Television Studios acquired the rights to the novel in 2021.

The Daydreams (Berkley, 2023) is Hankin's third novel.

Hankin has performed in the films While We're Young (2014) and Emergency Contacts (2016).

Hankin lives in New York City.

== Selected works ==
- Happy and You Know It. Berkley, 2020.
- A Special Place for Women. Berkley, 2021.
- The Daydreams. Berkley, 2023.
