= Julia Hart (filmmaker) =

American filmmaker (born 1982)

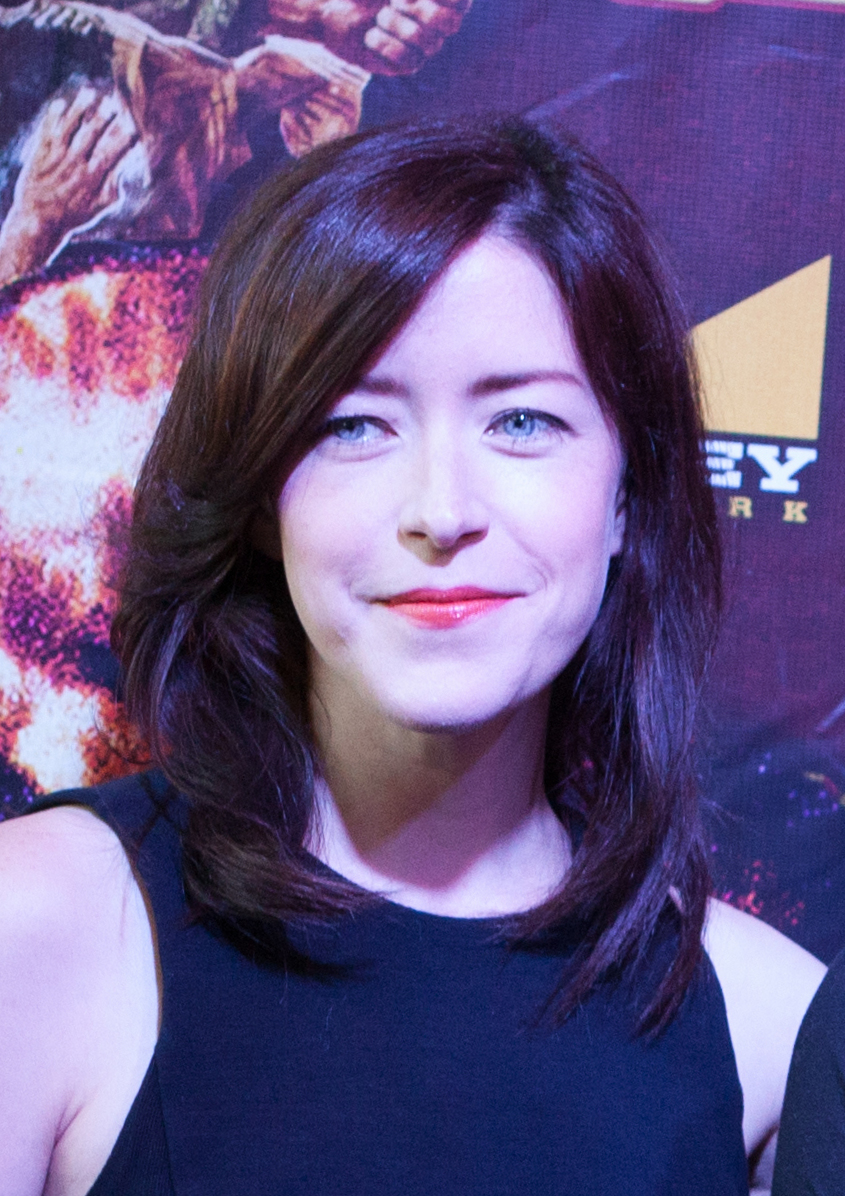
- Hart (right) with Brit Marling (left) at Fantastic Fest in 2015
- Born: April 7, 1982 (age 43); United States
- Occupations: Filmmaker; actress; philanthropist
- Years active: 2002, 2014–present
- Spouse: Jordan Horowitz
- Children: 2
- Relatives: James V. Hart (father)

Julia Hart (born April 7, 1982) is an American filmmaker and actress. She is known for writing and directing the comedy drama Miss Stevens (2016), the superhero drama Fast Color (2018), the musical romance Stargirl (2020), and the crime thriller I'm Your Woman (2020).

== Early life ==
Julia Hart was born on April 7, 1982. Her father James is a screenwriter in Hollywood, and her mother Judith is an actress. In 1998, while still a teenager, Hart co-founded the Peter Pan Birthday Club, a charity program associated with the Peter Pan Children's Fund. The Birthday Club was inspired by one of her own experiences as a child. In 1992, while in London for the UK premiere of the movie Hook, which was written by her father, she was given a tour of the Great Ormond Street Hospital. After returning home to the United States, she asked her friends to make donations to the hospital in lieu of presents for her tenth birthday.

Directly after graduating college, Hart began teaching high school at 25 years old. After eight years of teaching, she quit her job to pursue screenwriting. In addition to her father, her brother Jake is also a screenwriter.

== Career ==
Miss Stevens was Hart's directorial debut. Inspired by her experience as a teacher, Miss Stevens follows a teacher as she chaperones three students on a weekend trip to a drama competition. This film premiered at the South by Southwest (SXSW) Film Festival on March 12, 2016. Miss Stevens was nominated for the Grand Jury Award and Gamechanger Award at the festival.

Hart's film Fast Color premiered at South by Southwest in 2018, a year when 80% of the films in the SXSW festival's narrative feature competition were directed or co-directed by women.

Hart co-wrote Fast Color and I'm Your Woman with Jordan Horowitz, who has also served as a producer on her projects.

== Personal life ==
Hart is married to film producer Jordan Horowitz. The couple have two children together.

== Filmography ==
Title	Year	Director	Writer
2014	The Keeping Room	No	Yes
2016	Miss Stevens	Yes	Yes
2018	Fast Color	Yes	Yes
2020	Stargirl	Yes	Yes
2020	I'm Your Woman	Yes	Yes
2022	Hollywood Stargirl	Yes	Yes
2026	Don't Say Good Luck	Yes	Yes
