= Love, Stargirl =

Novel by Jerry Spinelli

- First edition cover
- Author: Jerry Spinelli
- Cover artist: Jerry Spinelli
- Language: English
- Genre: Romance
- Publisher: Knopf Books
- Publication date: August 14, 2007
- Publication place: United States
- Media type: Print (hardback)
- Pages: 274 pp
- ISBN: 978-0-375-85644-0
- OCLC: 319548034
- Preceded by: Stargirl

Love, Stargirl is a 2007 young adult novel by Jerry Spinelli.

The book is the sequel to the New York Times bestselling book Stargirl and centers on "the world's longest letter" in diary form. It picks up where the previous novel left off after Stargirl left Mica High and describes her bittersweet memories in the town of Mica, Arizona along with the involvements of new people in her life, in Phoenixville, Pennsylvania.

== Plot ==
New in town, homeschooled, and feeling rejected by Leo, the 16-year-old narrator of the first book who had fallen under her spell, Stargirl is lonely and sad—her "happy wagon," where she keeps stones representing her level of happiness, is almost empty. She befriends Dootsie, a noisy but lovable 6-year-old who takes a shine to Stargirl and wants to switch.

Dootsie introduces her to Betty Lou, an agoraphobic woman. She is quite nice and Stargirl soon becomes friends with her as well. They share a very nice time watching flowers together. Betty Lou is divorced and afraid of getting out of her house, so Dootsie comes in and cheers her up every day.

With the arrival of autumn, Stargirl's life is affected as she meets several new characters: Alvina, a grumpy young girl who delivers donuts to Betty Lou; Perry, a teen boy who Alvina is falling in love with; and Perry's "harem," the Honeybees.

As winter sets in, Stargirl plans a winter solstice party, inviting all of the people she has encountered in her new town to celebrate the beginning of winter by joining her at sunrise on her Enchanted Hill, which she now calls Calendar Hill. She sees a house on fire, and in her attempt to break in to warn any possible residents, she ends up in the hospital with smoke-damaged lungs and a sprained ankle. She stays in the hospital for five weeks, getting visited by Dootsie (in her Halloween costume), Alvina, Perry, and the Honeybees. Stargirl also discovers the truth about Perry, who has been very mysterious about his family and personal life. She learns his mother has a new baby, whom Perry has been trying to support by working several jobs and by resorting to "stealing" to avoid burdening her with feeding him. In the end, Stargirl becomes worried that no one will show up for her solstice party, but is reassured by Archie, her former teacher and friend from Arizona, who arrives to attend her celebration and comforts her with his wisdom.

On the morning of the winter solstice, Stargirl is overwhelmed and surprised when a huge crowd of her friends and acquaintances, and several other people she's unfamiliar with, flock to Calendar Hill, including her friend Betty Lou who hasn't left her house in nine years. The magic moment of sunrise is magnified by a special tent her parents have built, allowing the sunlight to stream in through a hole in the tent, forming a single beam that cuts through the crowd of people and pierces the back wall. Everyone is profoundly affected by the start of this new day and returns home to the start of a cold winter.

In the end, Stargirl asks Archie what she should do about missing Leo, and about Perry. He tells her to remember who she is and do what her heart tells her.

== Reception ==
A review in Publishers Weekly reads, "Readers should embrace Stargirl’s originality and bigheartedness". Kirkus Reviews wrote, "Humor, graceful writing, lively characters and important lessons about life will make this a hit with fans of Stargirl and anyone who likes a quiet, reflective novel".

The Horn Book Magazine opined, "this sequel to Stargirl is entertaining but lacks the spunk of the original, as both Spinelli’s trademark humor and his free-spirited heroine buckle under the weight of frequent doses of sentimentality and self-conscious cuteness." School Library Journal said, "this novel is as charming and unique as its sensitive, nonconformist heroine...this stellar follow-up is both profound and funny."
