= Rob Simonsen =

American composer

- Born: St. Louis, Missouri, U.S.
- Genres: Film score; new-age; electronic; jazz
- Occupations: Film composer; conductor
- Instruments: Piano; keyboards; synthesizer
- Website: robsimonsen.com

Rob Simonsen is an American composer and conductor. He is best known for his scores in films such as 500 Days of Summer (2009), The Age of Adaline (2015), Gifted (2017), The Only Living Boy in New York (2017), Tully (2018), Love, Simon (2018), The Front Runner (2018), The Way Back (2020), Ghostbusters: Afterlife (2021), The Adam Project (2022), The Whale (2022), Deadpool & Wolverine (2024), It Ends with Us (2024) and Elio (2025), and the television series Life in Pieces (2015–2019). He is also known for collaborating with directors Marc Webb, Julia Hart, Jason Reitman, Shawn Levy, Darren Aronofsky, Henry Joost and Ariel Schulman.

== Early life ==
Simonsen began playing the piano by ear at an early age. His grandmother was a voice teacher and music was around him in his family home. He later studied music at Southern Oregon University, the University of Oregon and Portland State University.

== Career ==
Rob's first break into film composing was the independent feature Westender in 2003. In 2004 he teamed up with composer Mychael Danna and has provided additional music and arrangements on Surf's Up, Fracture, Moneyball, and the Oscar-winning Life of Pi. Simonsen and Danna co-wrote the score of (500) Days of Summer, and Joss Whedon's television series Dollhouse. Also among Simonsen's work includes the Sundance Film Festival features The Way, Way Back and The Spectacular Now, The Age of Adaline, Love, Simon, The Way Back, and Stargirl.

In 2009 he opened his own studio, and The Hollywood Reporter named him one of the "15 Composers Primed to Take Their Place on the A List."

Simonsen's music can be heard in nearly all iPhone 5 ads, and he appears in them as the conductor. "Red", one of his tracks for iPhone 5, has gained wide recognition. His music was featured in Coca-Cola's 2018 Super Bowl TV spot, "The Wonder of Us".

On September 6, 2019, Simonsen released his first solo album, Rêveries, on Sony Masterworks.

== Awards ==
- World Soundtrack Award (nomination): Discovery of the Year for The Spectacular Now, The Way, Way Back (2013)
- International Film Music Critics Award (nomination): Best Original Score for an Action/Adventure/Thriller Film for Nerve (2016)
- Hollywood Music in Media Award (nomination): Best Original Score in an Independent Film for The Whale (2022)
- Indiana Film Journalists Award (nomination): Best Musical Score for The Whale (2022)

== Filmography ==
=== Films ===
Year	Title	Director(s)	Studio(s)	Notes
2003	Westender	Brock Morse	M.O.B Productions	—N/a
2004	Two Fisted	Todd E. Freeman	York Entertainment	—N/a
2005	Eve and the Fire Horse	Julia Kwan	Mongrel Media	Composed with Mychael Danna
2006	Lonely Hearts	Todd Robinson	Roadside Attractions; Samuel Goldwyn Films	Additional music Score by Mychael Danna
2007	Surf's Up	Ash Brannon; Chris Buck	Sony Pictures Releasing; Columbia Pictures	Additional music Score by Mychael Danna
2008	Stone of Destiny	Charles Martin Smith	Alliance Films	Additional music
2008	Management	Stephen Belber	Samuel Goldwyn Films	Co-composed with Mychael Danna
2009	The Imaginarium of Doctor Parnassus	Terry Gilliam	Lionsgate UK	Additional music Score by Mychael Danna and Jeff Danna
2009	(500) Days of Summer	Marc Webb	Fox Searchlight Pictures	Co-composed with Mychael Danna
2010	All Good Things	Andrew Jarecki	Magnolia Pictures	—N/a
2011	The Brooklyn Brothers Beat the Best	Ryan O'Nan	Oscilloscope	—N/a
2011	Moneyball	Bennett Miller	Sony Pictures Releasing; Columbia Pictures	Additional music Score by Mychael Danna
2012	The English Teacher	Craig Zisk	Cinedigm Entertainment	—N/a
2012	LOL	Lisa Azuelos	Lionsgate	—N/a
2012	The Final Member	Zach Math; Jonah Bekhor	Drafthouse Films	Documentary
2012	Seeking a Friend for the End of the World	Lorene Scafaria	Focus Features	Composed with Jonathan Sadoff
2012	Girl Most Likely	Shari Springer Berman; Robert Pulcini	Lionsgate; Roadside Attractions	—N/a
2012	Life of Pi	Ang Lee	20th Century Fox	Additional music Score by Mychael Danna
2013	The Spectacular Now	James Ponsoldt	A24	—N/a
2013	The Way, Way Back	Nat Faxon; Jim Rash	Fox Searchlight Pictures	—N/a
2014	Wish I Was Here	Zach Braff	Focus Features	—N/a
2014	Chu and Blossom	Charles Chu; Gavin Kelly	TideRock Media; Character Brigade; Films 5 Productions; Soaring Flight Productions; Baked Industries	—N/a
2014	Foxcatcher	Bennett Miller	Sony Pictures Classics	Additional music by Mychael Danna and West Dylan Thordson
2015	The Age of Adaline	Lee Toland Krieger	Lionsgate	Additional music by Duncan Blickenstaff
2015	Burnt	John Wells	The Weinstein Company	—N/a
2015	Stonewall	Roland Emmerich	Roadside Attractions	Replaced Harald Kloser and Thomas Wander
2016	Nerve	Henry Joost; Ariel Schulman	Lionsgate	—N/a
2016	Viral	Henry Joost; Ariel Schulman	Dimension Films; RADiUS-TWC	—N/a
2016	Miss Stevens	Julia Hart	The Orchard	—N/a
2016	Two Is a Family	Hugo Gélin	Mars Films	—N/a
2016	The Cleanse	Bobby Miller	Vertical Entertainment	Composed with Eskmo
2017	Going in Style	Zach Braff	Warner Bros. Pictures; New Line Cinema	—N/a
2017	Gifted	Marc Webb	Fox Searchlight Pictures	Additional music by Duncan Blickenstaff
2017	The House of Tomorrow	Peter Livolsi	Shout! Studios	—N/a
2017	The Only Living Boy in New York	Marc Webb	Roadside Attractions; Amazon Studios	Additional music by Duncan Blickenstaff
2017	The Upside	Neil Burger	STXfilms; Lantern Entertainment	—N/a
2017	Father Figures	Lawrence Sher	Warner Bros. Pictures	Additional music by Duncan Blickenstaff
2018
2018	Love, Simon	Greg Berlanti	20th Century Fox	—N/a
2018	Tully	Jason Reitman	Focus Features	—N/a
2018	The Front Runner	Jason Reitman	Sony Pictures Releasing; Columbia Pictures; Stage 6 Films	—N/a
2019	Captive State	Rupert Wyatt	Focus Features	—N/a
2019	Fast Color	Julia Hart	Lionsgate; Codeblack Films	—N/a
2019	Our Friend	Gabriela Cowperthwaite	Gravitas Ventures	—N/a
2020	The Way Back	Gavin O'Connor	Warner Bros. Pictures	—N/a
2020	Stargirl	Julia Hart	Disney+ Walt Disney Pictures	—N/a
2021	Ghostbusters: Afterlife	Jason Reitman	Sony Pictures Releasing; Columbia Pictures	Ghostbusters theme by Elmer Bernstein; Additional music by Duncan Blickenstaff
2022	The Adam Project	Shawn Levy	Netflix	Additional music by Taylor Lipari-Hassett
2022	Hollywood Stargirl	Julia Hart	Disney+ Walt Disney Pictures	Composed with Duncan Blickenstaff
2022	The Whale	Darren Aronofsky	A24	—N/a
2023	Good Grief	Dan Levy	Netflix	—N/a
2024	Deadpool & Wolverine	Shawn Levy	Marvel Studios	Additional music by Taylor Lipari-Hassett
2024	It Ends with Us	Justin Baldoni	Sony Pictures Releasing; Columbia Pictures	Replaced Brian Tyler; Composed with Duncan Blickenstaff
2025	Elio	Madeline Sharafian; Domee Shi; Adrian Molina	Walt Disney Pictures	Additional music by Duncan Blickenstaff and Taylor Lipari-Hassett; First score for an animated film
2025	Caught Stealing	Darren Aronofsky	Sony Pictures Releasing; Columbia Pictures	Composed with Idles

=== Television ===
Year	Title	Creator(s)	Studio(s)	Notes
2009	Dollhouse	Joss Whedon	Fox	2 seasons Composed with Mychael Danna
2010	Blue Bloods	Robin Green; Mitchell Burgess	CBS	Theme music composer Score by Mark Snow
2012	Battleground	J. D. Walsh	Hulu	Season 1
2015	Life in Pieces	Justin Adler	CBS	2 seasons
2022	Stranger Things	The Duffer Brothers	Netflix	Orchestral arrangements Score by Kyle Dixon and Michael Stein

== Discography ==
Studio albums

- Rêveries (2019)
