= Stargirl (novel) =

2000 young adult novel by Jerry Spinelli

- First edition
- Cover artist: Jerry Spinelli
- Language: English
- Series: Stargirl
- Genre: Young Adult Fiction
- Publisher: Alfred A. Knopf
- Publication date: August 8, 2000
- Publication place: United States
- Media type: Novel
- Pages: 169 pp
- ISBN: 0-679-88637-0
- OCLC: 43207653
- LC Class: PZ7.S75663 St 2000
- Followed by: Love, Stargirl

Stargirl is a young adult novel written by American author Jerry Spinelli and first published in 2000. The novel was well received by critics, who praised Stargirl's character and the novel's overall message of nonconformity. It was a New York Times Bestseller, a Parents Choice Gold Award Winner, an ALA Top Ten Best Books for Young Adults Award winner, and a Publishers Weekly Best Book of the Year. A follow up entitled Love, Stargirl, was released on August 14, 2007. A feature film adaptation of the novel, directed by Julia Hart and starring Grace VanderWaal, was released in 2020 on Disney+.

== Plot ==
At the age of 12, Leo and his family move from Pennsylvania to Arizona. Before their move, he is gifted a porcupine necktie from his uncle Pete as a farewell present, inspiring him to collect more like it. At 14, his collection of porcupine neckties is mentioned in a local newspaper, leading him to anonymously be sent another.

Two years later, a quirky, homeschooled transfer student named Stargirl Caraway arrives at Leo's school, Mica High. Popular student Hillari Kimble takes an immediate disliking to Stargirl due to her strange behavior, and the majority of the student population joins Hillari in ostracizing and bullying her. One of Stargirl's quirks is singing and playing ukulele to students on their birthdays. When Hillari orders Stargirl not to sing to her on her birthday, Stargirl instead directs the song to Leo, confessing that she finds him cute.

After Stargirl succeeds in getting the crowd excited about the school's losing football team while cheering for them at a game, she gains the student body's respect and is invited to join the cheerleading squad. However, her popularity is short-lived when students begin to resent her habit of cheering for both teams at sporting events. Stargirl is interviewed on the student-run television show Hot Seat hosted by Leo and his best friend Kevin, which quickly turns into an attack on her personality and actions before an advising teacher cuts the show short. Shortly thereafter, Stargirl stops cheering for both teams at games, but cannot stop herself from comforting a hurt player from the opposing team during a playoff basketball game; she is subsequently blamed for Mica High's loss in the following game and is shunned by the entire student body, except for Leo, her friend Dori Dilson, and, to some extent, Kevin.

Leo praises Stargirl for her kindness, bravery, and nonconformity, and the two begin a tentative romance. Leo experiences her unusual lifestyle and starts helping her with various projects, such as leaving cards for strangers and dropping change on the sidewalk for others to find. While initially deliriously happy with their relationship, he gradually realizes his connection to Stargirl has made him an outcast as well, and tries to convince her to act more "normal." She starts going by her real name, Susan, and wearing typical clothing. When these actions fail to produce results, Stargirl decides that the best way to become popular is to win the state's public speaking competition. She succeeds and returns to school expecting a hero's welcome, but finds that only three people have shown up to congratulate her. Realizing that by trying to fit in, she has achieved nothing and has only betrayed her true self, Stargirl reverts to her former personality. Leo consequently ends their relationship so he can be accepted by their peers.

Stargirl attends the school's spring dance—the Ocotillo ball—with Dori. She arrives on a bike covered in sunflowers. Though initially ignored by the other attendees, she attracts attention after convincing the bandleader to play the "Bunny Hop," and the other students join her in dancing until the only people not participating are Hillari and her boyfriend Wayne. Afterwards, Hillari admonishes Stargirl for ruining every social event she attends and slaps her across the face. Stargirl counters the attack with a kiss on the cheek. No one in town sees Stargirl again after that night; Leo later learns that she and her family have moved to Minnesota.

Fifteen years later, Leo still wonders what has happened to Stargirl. One day before his birthday, he anonymously receives a new porcupine necktie in the mail—presumably from Stargirl.

== Adaptations ==
=== Stage ===
In January 2015, Stargirl was staged by First Stage company. The play was directed by John Maclay, and the cast were mainly teenagers. The play met with positive reviews from critics and audience.

=== Film ===
In February 2018, a feature film adaptation produced by Walt Disney Pictures was announced to be in development. The film is directed by Julia Hart, from a screenplay written by Kristin Hahn and stars Grace VanderWaal in the title role. Filming began on September 24, 2018 in New Mexico and wrapped November 16, 2018. The film was released exclusively on the streaming service, Disney+ on March 13, 2020.

While the plot remains relatively the same, various changes were made. Stargirl and Leo's relationship begins almost immediately in the film and they never formally break up, though it is slightly implied to be on Stargirl's part. Leo's fascination with porcupine ties comes from his deceased father rather than his uncle who is never mentioned. While Kevin and Dori are included, with the former's last name changed from Quinlant to Singh to match with the actor's ethnicity, various new characters are added as part of Leo and Stargirl's social group. Hillari's role is somewhat reduced, however she is still responsible for Stargirl's sadness. Rather than a typical bully, Hillari's dislike for Stargirl comes from how she inconsiderately tried to cheer up her brother, only to make him more miserable. Stargirl apologizes to her at the end. There is also heavy emphasis on music in the film with classic rock songs being used. For the dance at the end, instead of Stargirl leading everyone into the "Bunny Hop", she has Leo perform "Just What I Needed" by The Cars.

== Legacy ==
In 2004 students from Kent, Ohio founded a Stargirl Society, which aimed to promote the nonconformist message of the novel. The society received much attention, and inspired young people all over the world to create their own societies.
