= Childstar =

Childstar may refer to:

- Childstar (film), a 2004 Canadian comedy film
- Childstar (album), a 2025 studio album by Grace VanderWaal
