= Perfectly Imperfect (EP) =

EP by Grace VanderWaal
- Released: December 2, 2016
- Genre: Pop
- Length: 17:00
- Label: Syco; Columbia
- Producer: Greg Wells

Grace VanderWaal chronology
Perfectly Imperfect (2016)	Just the Beginning (2017)

Singles from Perfectly Imperfect
- 1. "I Don't Know My Name" Released: November 18, 2016

Perfectly Imperfect is the debut EP by American recording artist Grace VanderWaal, the winner of America's Got Talent (AGT), season 11. Released on December 2, 2016, it includes all four songs that VanderWaal wrote and performed on AGT and another original song by VanderWaal, "Gossip Girl". Produced by Greg Wells, the EP debuted on the Billboard 200 albums chart at number nine. It was the best selling EP of 2016.

== Development and personnel ==
VanderWaal, who was then 12 years old, signed a recording deal with Columbia Records in September 2016, soon after winning AGT, and started production of her debut EP, Perfectly Imperfect. She began recording sessions in New York in October. Pre-orders for the recording entitled purchasers to an instant download of VanderWaal's song "I Don't Know My Name", which was the song she auditioned with at AGT. The EP was released on December 2, 2016.

There are five songs on the EP, including all four of VanderWaal's original songs from AGT and another original, "Gossip Girl". The recording is produced and mixed by Greg Wells, who is also given a songwriting credit on "Beautiful Thing" and credited with arrangements and instrumentals on the album, except that VanderWaal is credited with ukulele playing on all of the songs except "Clay" and "Beautiful Thing"; Autumn Rowe is given a songwriting credit on three of the songs. VanderWaal's sister Olivia is credited with art design. A Walmart version features one additional song, "Missing You".

== Singles and commercial uses ==
The first single from the EP, "I Don't Know My Name", was released on November 18, 2016, the same day the EP became available for pre-order. The song was included as an immediate free download with EP pre-orders. The song debuted at number 24 on the Bubbling Under Hot 100 Singles chart and number 37 on Billboard's Digital Song Sales chart. In Australia, it debuted at number 82 on the ARIA Singles Chart. The song debuted at No. 38 on Billboard's Hot Canadian Digital Singles Chart. Another song on the album, "Light the Sky", is featured as background music in Google's "Year in Search 2016" video.

VanderWaal also released lyrics videos on her YouTubeVEVO channel for the songs on the EP. The first was for "I Don't Know My Name", on November 18, 2016, which has accumulated more than 30 million views. The next was for "Clay", on December 2. "Light the Sky" followed on December 14, "Beautiful Thing" was released on December 21, and "Gossip Girl" debuted on December 28, 2016. The lyrics videos for the five songs have been viewed a total of more than 55 million times. Isis Briones of Teen Vogue wrote: "Through her lyrics alone, fans are able to feel exactly what her song is about – and once you pair them with her angelic melodies, there's definitely no stopping the feels."

In August 2017, Windex used VanderWaal's "Beautiful Thing" as the soundtrack for an advertisement.

== Promotion ==
VanderWaal has been promoting the EP with a series of appearances and performances. She performed "Light the Sky" and "Riptide" at halftime during the New York Knicks game at Madison Square Garden in New York City on November 6, 2016. VanderWaal performed "I Don't Know My Name" in the 2016 Macy's Thanksgiving Day Parade, on NBC's Today show on November 28 and at the Christmas tree lighting at South Street Seaport, in New York City, on November 29, where she also sang "Light the Sky". She sang "I Don't Know My Name" on The Wendy Williams Show on December 2, at Cyndi Lauper's annual holiday fundraiser at the Beacon Theatre on December 3, on CBS's The Talk on December 8 and at Z100's Jingle Ball Tour 2016 stop at Madison Square Garden on December 9, 2016.

In addition to her lyrics videos for the songs "I Don't Know My Name" and "Clay", VanderWaal released a video to promote Perfectly Imperfect on her YouTube VEVO channel featuring the song "I Don't Know My Name".

== Critical reception ==
Lindsay Peoples, writing for New York Magazine, called the first four songs, after hearing them on AGT, "not only catchy but emotional and unique to her own sound, a mix of raw and folk". Billboard magazine praised VanderWaal's vocals, finding them "reminiscent of a Taylor Swift-Regina Spektor hybrid". Brianna Wiest of Teen Vogue wrote: "The EP takes you through Grace's range, touching on issues that are all-too-well-known for young people, as well as soul-stokingly beautiful medleys that almost anyone could relate to. ... [W]e see ... her ability to master both a softer, vowel-breaking folk tone as well as push through a serious power-ballad by the end. It's rare that you see both at once, but that's part of the magic of Grace's sound: it's at once completely new, and totally unexpected." Vulture.com called "Beautiful Thing" "a pure delight, devoid of cynicism and complication ... [sung] with a voice that sounds [like] it should belong to a wistful 33-year-old." After Windex used the song as the soundtrack to an advertisement, Billboard added that VanderWaal can: "make you cry while watching an advertisement for a cleaning product ... [because of her] striking vocals and sincere lyrics". Jamie Weikel of the Reading Eagle commented that VanderWaal's "raspy voice makes her music iconic and lovable".

== Commercial performance ==
The EP debuted on the US Billboard 200 albums chart at number nine. and on Billboard's Canadian Albums Chart at number eleven. In its debut week, it sold about 52,000 units in the US, including 47,000 in physical form. It was the best selling EP of 2016 in the US.The EP has been streamed more than 241 million times on Spotify as of December 2025.

== Track listing ==
No.	Title	Writer(s)	Length
1.	"I Don't Know My Name"	Grace VanderWaal	2:28
2.	"Clay"	VanderWaal; Autumn Rowe	3:36
3.	"Light the Sky"	VanderWaal; Rowe	3:49
4.	"Beautiful Thing"	VanderWaal; Greg Wells	3:44
5.	"Gossip Girl"	VanderWaal; Rowe	3:23
Total length:			17:00

WalMart exclusive version
No.	Title	Writer(s)	Length
6.	"Missing You" (Coffeehouse version)	VanderWaal	1:54
Total length:			18:54

== Charts ==
Chart (2016)	Peak position
Canadian Albums (Billboard)	11
New Zealand Heatseekers Albums (RMNZ)	2
US Digital Albums (Billboard)	4
US Billboard 200	9
