= Just the Beginning (Grace VanderWaal album) =

2017 studio album by Grace VanderWaal

Studio album by Grace VanderWaal
- Released: November 3, 2017
- Genres: Pop; indie pop; bluegrass
- Length: 42:05
- Labels: Columbia; Syco
- Producers: Ido Zmishlany; Tim Sommers; Sean Douglas; Greg Wells; Gregg Wattenberg

Grace VanderWaal chronology
Perfectly Imperfect (2016)	Just the Beginning (2017)	Letters Vol. 1 (2019)

Singles from Just the Beginning
- 1. "Moonlight" Released: June 21, 2017; 2. "Sick of Being Told" Released: August 11, 2017; 3. "So Much More Than This" Released: December 4, 2017

Just the Beginning is the debut studio album by then 13-year-old American singer-songwriter Grace VanderWaal, consisting of twelve original tracks. It is VanderWaal's first full-length project and follows her debut EP, Perfectly Imperfect (2016).

The album was released on November 3, 2017, by Columbia Records and Syco Music, produced by Ido Zmishlany, Tim Sommers, Sean Douglas, Greg Wells and Gregg Wattenberg, among others. It debuted on the Billboard 200 albums chart at number 22. In advance of the album's release, VanderWaal released several singles from the album and promoted it with various live and broadcast appearances, and she further promoted it with her sold-out Just the Beginning Tour, which ran from November 2017 to February 2018. VanderWaal has writing credits for every song on Just the Beginning.

== Background and promotion ==
By early 2017, VanderWaal began working on the album, telling Billboard that it will be "more produced ... really the same sound ... [but] less acoustic" than her debut EP, Perfectly Imperfect (2016). She has said that her process changed for the album from her previous efforts, because she was writing songs "on demand" with a collaborator: "I've never done this before; it's kind of weird to go into a room with usually a 30-year-old man and just be like 'Oh, let me open up about my life to you and write a super personal song!'" VanderWaal has writing credits for every song on Just the Beginning.

On May 21, 2017, VanderWaal previewed "Burned" and "Just a Crush" at her benefit concert at The Valley Hospital in New Jersey. On June 21, as part of VidCon's opening show, YouTube OnStage, at Anaheim Convention Center in California, she premiered the first single from the album, "Moonlight". On July 20, 2017, she released her first official music video, for "Moonlight", which has accumulated more than 45 million views on YouTube. Her television promotions of the album began on August 15, with a return to America's Got Talent as a guest performer singing "Moonlight". She won the competition in 2016. On August 11, she released a second single from the album, "Sick of Being Told". On September 4, VanderWaal performed "Moonlight" on Live with Kelly and Ryan. She released a third single from the album, "So Much More Than This", on September 14. VanderWaal performed "Moonlight" on The Ellen DeGeneres Show on September 18, 2017. She released a promotional single from the album, "Escape My Mind", on October 5, 2017. VanderWaal performed new songs from the album at the Austin City Limits Music Festival in October. On October 26, 2017, VanderWaal released a second promotional single, "City Song". She appeared on Total Request Live on November 2 to promote the album and sing "So Much More Than This".

VanderWaal released Just the Beginning on November 3, 2017. She sang "Moonlight" on Megyn Kelly Today on the release date and began her first solo tour, the Just the Beginning Tour, on November 5, 2017, to promote the album. By September 2017, the 13-city tour had sold out. Later in November, she promoted the album in Japan with performances and interviews. In December, she released a music video for "So Much More Than This". In January 2018, VanderWaal released a music video for "City Song". The tour concluded in February 2018.

== Production ==
Producers on the album include Ido Zmishlany, Tim Sommers, Sean Douglas, Greg Wells, Gregg Wattenberg, Derek Fuhrmann, Mike Adubato and Michel Heyaca. Recording and mixing were performed at VsTheWorld Studios, Brooklyn, New York (tracks 1, 7, 8, 12 and 14), VanderWaal's home (track 1), Hourglass Studio, New York, New York (track 2), Westlake Studios, Los Angeles, California (track 3), Rocket Carousel Studio, Los Angeles, California (tracks 4, 10 and 13), Arcade Studios, New York, NY (tracks 5, 6, 9 and 11) and Platinum Sound Recording Studios, New York, New York (tracks 7, 8, 12 and 14).

== Reception ==
Before the album was released, reviewers commented on the individual song releases: Gil Kaufman of Billboard magazine wrote that "Moonlight" "displays a fun tropical beat making it the perfect summer song" and that it "digs a little deeper" and "displays maturity". Raisa Bruner of Time commented that the song "maintains [VanderWaal's] acoustic flair while layering in a lightly tropical touch". Jon Caramanica of The New York Times opined the album "sounds like steroidal bluegrass-inflected space-pop", and VanderWaal's vocal "sounds emotionally exhausted, like a singer twice her age, or more." Lisa Nguyen of Paste wrote of "Sick of Being Told": "The track is a catchy tune with poppy beats that perfectly capture [VanderWaal's] youthful spirit." Ali Booth, in Tiger Beat, stated: "We haven’t been able to get ... 'So Much More Than This' out of our heads since she released it last month!" A critic for Dallas Observer wrote that the same track "has a simple beat, but it explodes with sound when the chorus hits." The headline of People magazine's review of "Escape My Mind" said that the song "will make you think about it all the time", and reviewer Nicole Sands called it a "catchy upbeat song".

Nicholas Hautman of Us Weekly wrote that the album "transcends the comparisons [to Taylor Swift] that have followed [VanderWaal] since AGT. ... Throughout the refreshing LP, VanderWaal channels the folky twang of Swift's earlier projects, but intertwines the sounds of fellow musicians Florence Welch, Regina Spektor and even Miley Cyrus". Selina Fragassi of the Chicago Sun-Times commented that VanderWaal's "raspy-sweet-peculiar vocals recall Elle King, Regina Spektor and Katy Perry ... [and] proves herself a modern-day Mozart". The Buffalo News, reviewer opined: "The album tackles a wide range of scenarios and emotions, well beyond her 13 years, in 12 magnificently crafted tracks. VanderWaal entrances listeners with the pop masterpieces of 'Florets' and 'City Song', while conveying raw, powerful emotion in 'A Better Life' and 'Darkness Keeps Chasing Me'. It is this vast diversity in her songwriting that makes her stand out as a truly unique and exquisite artist." USA Today's review of the album noted:

"Burned" recalls Swift's high-drama orchestrations. "Insane Sometimes" is a dead ringer for a Halsey track, down to its troubled subject matter. VanderWaal's big-throated performance on "A Better Life" channels Florence Welch and Miley Cyrus. And the vaguely tropical-house production of "Florets" is seemingly crafted for pop radio. ... [H]er vocals align ... closely to Sia's in her full-voiced belting and nonchalant pronunciations, particularly on her stomping performance on the feisty "So Much More Than This". ... VanderWaal sounds like a 13-year-old in her songs, in the best possible way. In a voice that sounds refreshingly green, she launches herself at huge choruses with a total lack of restraint. ... Beyond the album's sleek pop production, there's still plenty of VanderWaal’s trademark ukulele strums to please her original fans, heard on the album's single "Moonlight" as well as highlights "Just a Crush" and "Escape My Mind". But it's "A Better Life", the song that so masterfully channels several of pop's biggest voices, that best combines VanderWaal's two modes, opening with her modest finger-picking before she unleashes one of the album's most exquisitely-sung melodies.

== Commercial performance ==
In the United States, the album debuted at number 22 on the Billboard 200 with 21,000 album-equivalent units, which included 17,000 traditional album sales. The album has been streamed more than 352 million times on Spotify as of December 2025.

== Track listing ==
Just the Beginning
No.	Title	Writer(s)	Producer(s)	Length
1.	"Moonlight"	Grace VanderWaal; Ido Zmishlany	Zmishlany	2:52
2.	"Sick of Being Told"	VanderWaal; Jeremy Dussolliet; Tim Sommers	Sommers	3:50
3.	"Burned"	VanderWaal; Sean Douglas	Douglas	3:11
4.	"Just a Crush"	VanderWaal	Greg Wells	3:14
5.	"So Much More Than This"	VanderWaal; Derek Fuhrmann; Gregg Wattenberg	Wattenberg; Fuhrmann	2:53
6.	"Escape My Mind"	VanderWaal; Wattenberg; Mike Adubato	Wattenberg; Adubato	3:16
7.	"Talk Good"	VanderWaal; Zmishlany; Olivia VanderWaal	Zmishlany	3:01
8.	"Florets"	VanderWaal; Zmishlany	Zmishlany	3:45
9.	"Insane Sometimes"	VanderWaal; Dan Henig	Wattenberg; Adubato	3:30
10.	"A Better Life"	VanderWaal	Wells	4:04
11.	"City Song"	VanderWaal; Wattenberg; Adubato	Wattenberg; Adubato	3:21
12.	"Darkness Keeps Chasing Me"	VanderWaal; Micah Premnath	Zmishlany	4:42
Total length:				42:05

Japanese CD bonus tracks
No.	Title	Length
13.	"Over the Rainbow"	2:32
14.	"I Don't Know My Name"	2:28

Target and Japanese CD bonus tracks
No.	Title	Writer(s)	Producer(s)	Length
13.	"Lungs"	VanderWaal; Wells	Wells	4:12
14.	"Hope for Change"	VanderWaal; Scott Harris	Zmishlany; Michel Heyaca	3:35

== Personnel ==
Adapted from the liner notes.

- Mike Adubato – accordion (track 6); percussion (track 11); drum programming (tracks 6, 11); keyboards (tracks 6, 9, 11); piano (tracks 6, 11); Pro Tools; producer
- Raymond Argueta – engineer
- Dylan Brady – ukulele (tracks 1, 7, 8)
- Sarah Bromley – product manager
- John Doelp – A&R
- Sean Douglas – instrumentation (track 3), producer
- Jeremy Dussolliet – background vocals (track 2)
- Dave Eggar – cello (tracks 8, 12), cello arrangement, string arrangements, strings
- Mark Endert – mixing
- Derek Fuhrmann – drum programming (track 5); guitar (track 5); bass guitar (track 5); keyboards (track 5); percussion (track 5); producer; background vocals (track 5)
- Michel Heyaca – vocal engineer
- Bruno Jornada – assistant
- Dave Kutch – mastering
- Jordan Miller – background vocals (track 9)
- Zoë Moss – background vocals (tracks 7, 8)
- Jeremy Nichols – engineer
- Andrew Pertes – bass (track 1); upright bass (track 7)
- Che Pope – engineer
- Pierre-Luc Rioux – bass, guitar (track 3)
- Olivia Smith – art direction, design
- Tim Sommers – bass; drums (track 2), guitar; keyboards (track 2); background vocals (track 2); engineer; mixing; percussion; producer; ukulele
- Grace VanderWaal – bass (tracks 6, 9); glockenspiel (track 2); bass guitar; percussion (tracks 2, 6, 11); ukulele (tracks 2, 4, 5, 6, 9, 10, 11); vocals; background vocals (tracks 2, 6, 9)
- Olivia Vanderwaal – percussion (track 6); background vocals (track 6)
- Gregg Wattenberg – drums (track 9); engineer; classical guitar (track 5); guitar (tracks 6, 9, 11); acoustic guitar; bass guitar (track 6); keyboards (track 5); producer; ukulele (tracks 5, 6, 11); background vocals (tracks 5, 9)
- Mia Wattenberg – background vocals (tracks 5, 6, 11)
- Greg Wells – engineer; instrumentation (tracks 4, 10); mixing; producer; guitar (track 13)
- Paul Westlake – photography
- Mark Williams – A&R
- James Wooten – engineer, string arrangements, strings (tracks 8, 12), strings contractor
- Ido Zmishlany – bass (track 8); drums (track 7); engineer; guitar (tracks 8, 12, 14); keyboards (tracks 7, 8); mixing; producer; programming; string arrangements; strings; ukulele (tracks 7, 8); background vocals (tracks 7, 12)
- Joe Zook – mixing

== Charts ==
Chart (2017–2018)	Peak position
Australian Albums (ARIA)	60
Belgian Albums (Ultratop Flanders)	118
Belgian Albums (Ultratop Wallonia)	107
Canadian Albums (Billboard)	20
Dutch Albums (Album Top 100)	124
Japanese Albums (Billboard Japan)	22
Japanese Physical Albums (Oricon)	37
New Zealand Heatseeker Albums (RMNZ)	6
US Billboard 200	22
