= Grace VanderWaal =

American singer-songwriter (born 2004)

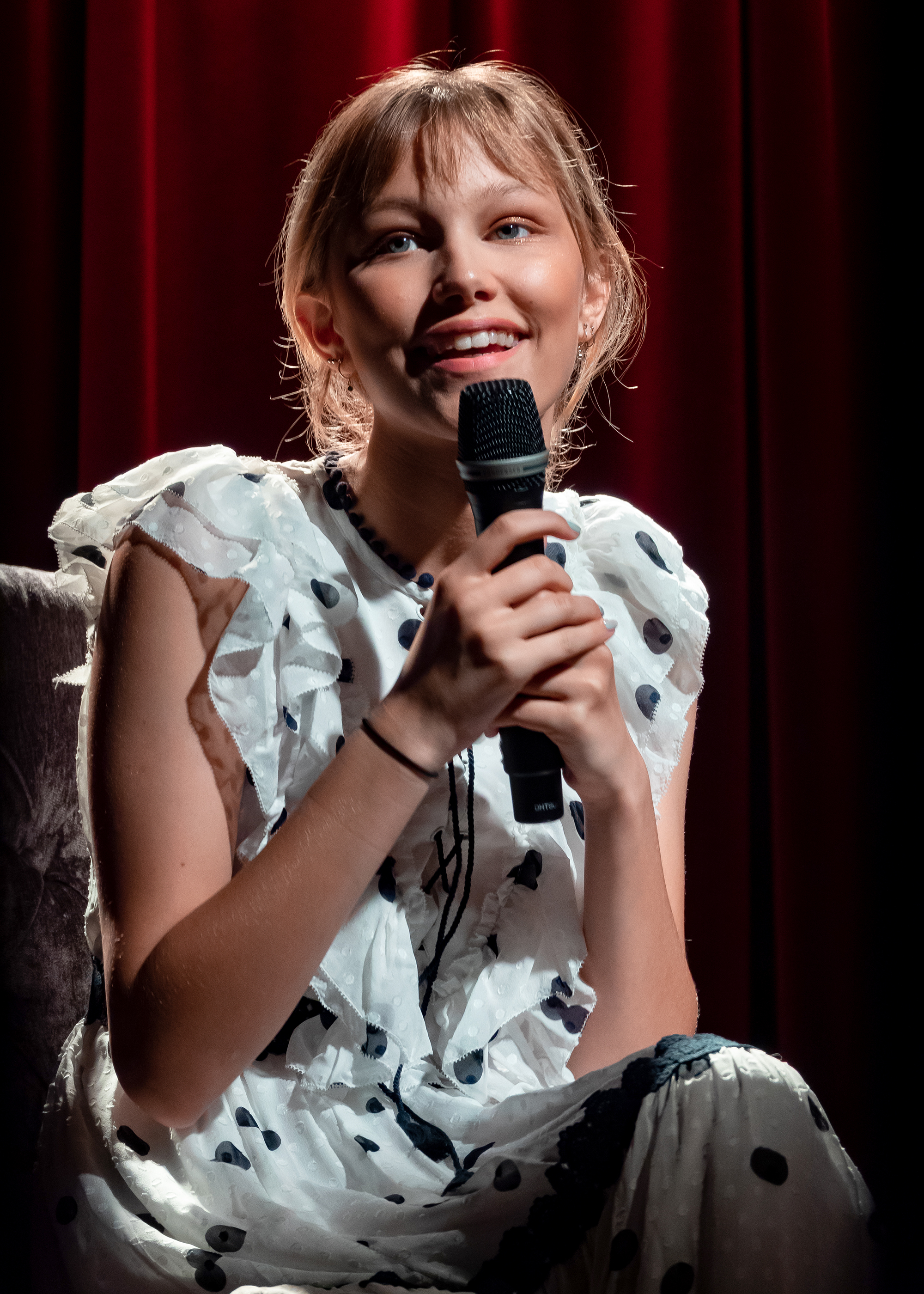
- VanderWaal in 2018

Background information
- Born: January 15, 2004 (age 22); Kansas, US
- Genre: Pop
- Occupations: Singer; songwriter; actress
- Instrument: Ukulele
- Labels: Syco; Columbia; Pulse
- Website: gracevanderwaal.com

Grace Avery VanderWaal (born January 15, 2004) is an American singer-songwriter and actress. She is known for her distinctive voice and has often accompanied herself on the ukulele.

VanderWaal began her musical career by posting videos of her original songs and covers on YouTube and performing at open mic nights near her home in Suffern, New York. In September 2016, at age 12, she won the eleventh season of the NBC competition show America's Got Talent (AGT), performing her original songs. In December 2016, with Columbia Records and Syco Music, she released her debut EP Perfectly Imperfect, which became the best selling EP that year. Her first full-length studio album, Just the Beginning (2017), debuted at number 22 on the U.S Billboard 200. She released a second EP, Letters Vol. 1, in 2019.

She has performed at the Planet Hollywood Resort & Casino in Las Vegas, Madison Square Garden, the opening and closing of the 2017 Special Olympics World Winter Games in Austria, various benefit concerts, the Austin City Limits Music Festival and on various television talk shows. VanderWaal conducted her first concert tour in 2017 in support of Just the Beginning. She next toured in mid-2018 with Imagine Dragons in their Evolve World Tour, and in 2019, after opening in a tour for Florence and the Machine, she conducted her own Ur So Beautiful tour. She made her acting debut in 2020, starring as Susan "Stargirl" Caraway in the Disney+ musical drama film Stargirl, followed by its 2022 sequel Hollywood Stargirl. VanderWaal released her second full-length album, Childstar, in April 2025, which she followed with a Childstar Tour in May.

VanderWaal has received two Radio Disney Music Awards (including a Best New Artist award), a Teen Choice Award, the 2017 Billboard Women in Music Rising Star Award, and the 2018 MTV Europe Music Award for Best Push Act. She has been named to Billboard magazine's 21 Under 21 list of fast-rising young music stars five times (2016–2019 and 2021) and is the youngest person ever included in the Forbes 30 Under 30 music list.

== Early life ==
=== Family and education ===
VanderWaal was born near Kansas City, Kansas, to Tina and David VanderWaal, who lived in Lenexa at the time. Her father is of Dutch descent. Her mother, a silversmith and glass artist, died in 2025 at age 53. When her father became a vice president of marketing at LG Electronics in 2007, the family moved to Suffern, New York. She has an older brother and sister. After winning America's Got Talent in 2016, VanderWaal was home-schooled and enrolled in online courses for 7th grade but later attended public school part of the time. She graduated from the Laurel Springs School in 2022.

=== Early musical efforts ===
VanderWaal was singing and making up songs by the age of three. As a preteen, she found songwriting inspiration by watching movies and trying to imagine what a character was feeling, and "what it would be like if I were them, and wrote a song." She decided to learn the ukulele after watching a Brazilian au pair play and seeing a Twenty One Pilots video on YouTube. She asked for one for her 11th birthday but her mother refused, thinking she would never learn to play it. Then she bought one herself, using money she received for her 11th birthday, and watched more videos to teach herself how to play. (Note: VanderWaal told Access Hollywood that she was hoping for a ukulele for her 11th birthday, "and I remember my mom did not buy me one, 'cause she thought I would never play it.") She also played the saxophone in her school's marching band.

In 2015, VanderWaal began to record song covers and original songs, accompanying herself on ukulele, and to post them on her YouTube channel. She includes among her musical influences such artists as Jason Mraz, Twenty One Pilots and Katy Perry. She also began to perform during open mic events at small venues near her home and to study music theory. In July 2016, after her audition on AGT, she performed at the Lafayette Theatre in Suffern and then at the Ramapo Summer Concert Series at Palisades Credit Union Park.

== Career ==
=== 2016: America's Got Talent and Perfectly Imperfect ===
On June 7, 2016, VanderWaal auditioned for the eleventh season of NBC's talent competition show AGT, singing her original song about identity, "I Don't Know My Name". She was selected by one of the show's judges, Howie Mandel, as his "golden buzzer" act to skip the next round and perform in the live quarterfinal round. Simon Cowell called VanderWaal "the next Taylor Swift." Brittany Spanos in Rolling Stone magazine termed the song an "emotional, catchy, quirky tune". VanderWaal continued to perform her original songs on the show; for her next performance at the quarterfinals on August 23, 2016, she sang "Beautiful Thing", a song that she wrote for her sister. For the semi-finals on August 30, she performed "Light the Sky", and for the September 13 finals, she sang "Clay", a song about dealing with bullies. AGT's video of VanderWaal's audition has drawn more than 100 million views, and was ranked the No. 5 trending YouTube video of 2016.

VanderWaal again performed "I Don't Know My Name" at the September 14 finale results episode, then introduced a performance by Stevie Nicks, who compared her own style with VanderWaal's. At the end of the broadcast, VanderWaal was announced as the season 11 winner. She was the second female winner and the second child winner in the show's history.

VanderWaal planned to use part of her AGT winnings to make a donation to charity and to buy two tree houses, built by the team from Treehouse Masters, for herself and her sister. VanderWaal was a guest on The Ellen DeGeneres Show and The Tonight Show Starring Jimmy Fallon in September 2016, and she headlined four sold-out concerts in the PH Showroom at the Las Vegas Planet Hollywood Resort & Casino in October, performing with other AGT finalists. She also headlined the America's Got Talent Holiday Spectacular in December on NBC, where she performed her arrangement of "Frosty the Snowman".

VanderWaal signed a recording deal with Columbia Records in 2016 and released her debut EP, Perfectly Imperfect, on December 2, 2016. The five songs on the EP include all four of VanderWaal's original songs from AGT and another original, "Gossip Girl", all produced by Greg Wells. A Walmart version featured one additional song, "Missing You (Coffeehouse Version)". The EP debuted on the Billboard 200 albums chart at No. 9 and was the best selling EP of 2016. The lead single, "I Don't Know My Name", debuted on Billboard's Digital Song Sales chart at No. 37 and on the Bubbling Under Hot 100 Singles chart at No. 24. Another song on the EP, "Light the Sky", was featured as background music in Google's "Year in Search 2016" video.

VanderWaal promoted the EP with a series of appearances and performances. In November 2016, she performed "Light the Sky" and "Riptide" at halftime during a New York Knicks game at Madison Square Garden in New York City, and "I Don't Know My Name" in the 2016 Macy's Thanksgiving Day Parade, on NBC's Today show and at the Christmas tree lighting at South Street Seaport, in New York City, where she also sang "Light the Sky". In December, she sang "I Don't Know My Name" on The Wendy Williams Show, at Cyndi Lauper's annual holiday fundraiser at the Beacon Theatre (where she also duetted with Lauper on "True Colors"), on CBS's The Talk, and at Z100's Jingle Ball Tour 2016 stop at Madison Square Garden. In reviewing the last event, Jon Caramanica of The New York Times commented: "One of the loudest receptions of the night was for Grace VanderWaal, a precociously thoughtful 12-year-old singer-songwriter-ukulele player". Later that month, VanderWaal returned to NBC's Today Show to sing "Light the Sky".

=== 2017–2018: Just the Beginning ===
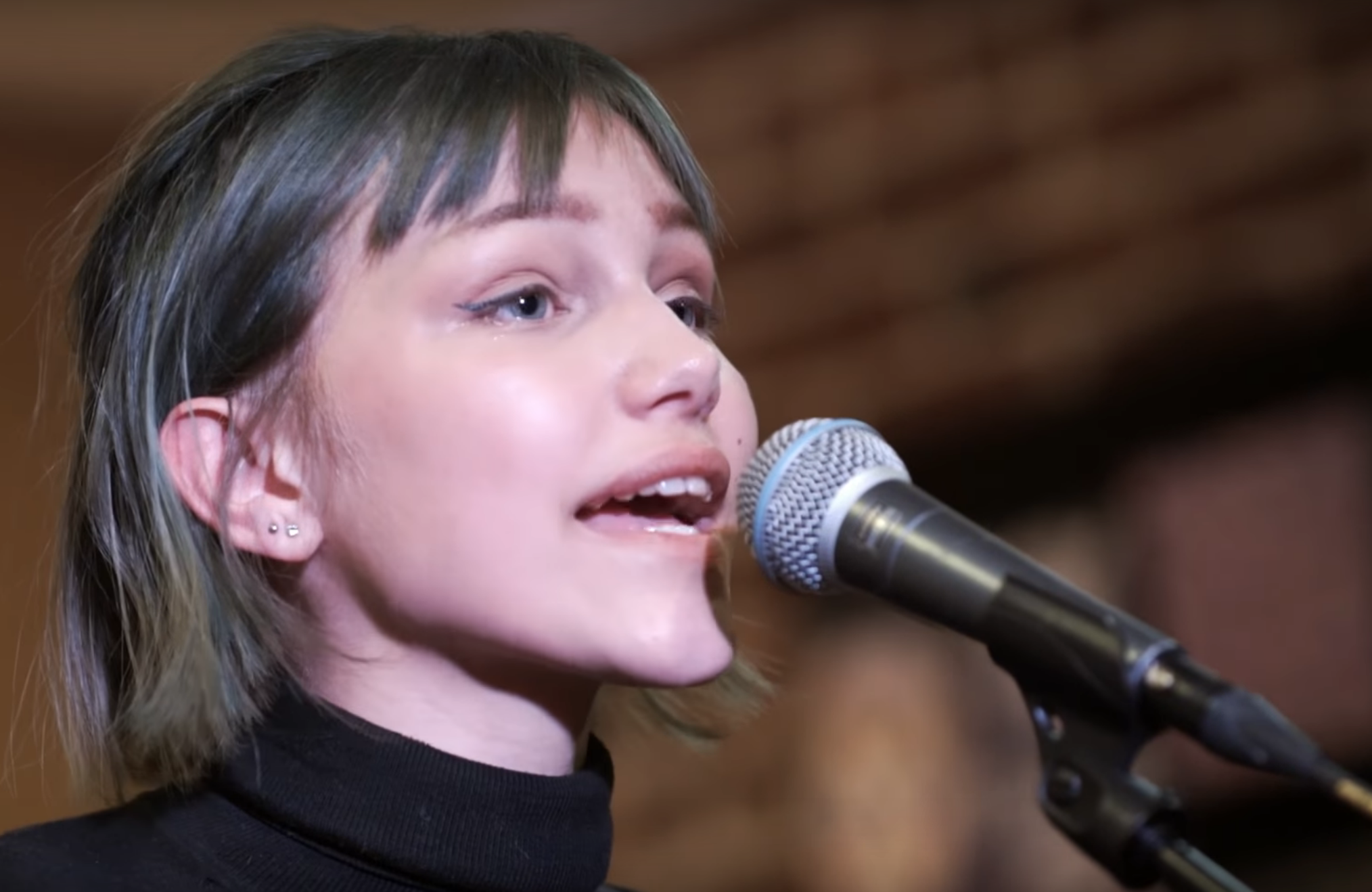
VanderWaal performing in 2018

In January 2017, VanderWaal sang "I Don't Know My Name" on Live with Kelly. She performed atop the Empire State Building for engaged couples at the building's Valentine's Day lighting event in February. In March 2017, she performed at We Day Illinois at Allstate Arena to celebrate young people's action on social issues. She also sang "Light the Sky" at the annual benefit gala "One Night for One Drop", organized by Cirque du Soleil at the New York-New York Hotel and Casino in Las Vegas. The same month, VanderWaal appeared twice at the 2017 Special Olympics World Winter Games in Austria, duetting with Jason Mraz on two of his songs at the opening ceremony and performing her own songs at the closing ceremony. In April, she performed at WE Day charity events in Seattle, and Los Angeles, and she appeared at the 2017 Radio Disney Music Awards. Her May appearances included a fundraiser at Ramapo High School in New Jersey for The Valley Hospital's children's programs. In June 2017, VanderWaal launched Perfectly Imperfect in Japan, performing and meeting with fans there. She donated funds to help establish an elementary school show choir in the East Ramapo Central School District, sponsored scholarships for graduating seniors from each of Ramapo and Spring Valley High Schools pursuing music and another show choir at Chestnut Ridge Middle School.

By early 2017, VanderWaal began working on a full-length album, eventually titled Just the Beginning, that she called "more produced ... really the same sound ... [but] less acoustic" than her debut EP. She told an interviewer for Rookie magazine about how her process changed for the album, writing songs "on demand" with a collaborator: "I've never done this before; it's kind of weird to go into a room with usually a 30-year-old man and just be like 'Oh, let me open up about my life to you and write a super personal song!'" In June, she participated in VidCon's opening show, YouTube OnStage, in The Arena at Anaheim Convention Center in Anaheim, California, where she premiered the first single from the upcoming album, "Moonlight". She later released additional singles from the album. In July, she performed at the Starkey Gala in St. Paul, Minnesota, to support hearing charities. In August, she returned to AGT as a guest performer, singing "Moonlight". The same month, Windex used VanderWaal's "Beautiful Thing" as the soundtrack to an advertisement, Honda used her cover of "Over the Rainbow" for a Japanese ad, and SheKnows Media ranked "I Don't Know My Name" as one of the 16 most empowering songs for women so far in 2017. In September, VanderWaal performed on Live with Kelly and Ryan. The same month, she appeared on Treehouse Masters in an episode about the tree houses that VanderWaal had planned since her appearance on AGT, and modeled at New York Fashion Week for Marc Jacobs.

VanderWaal promoted Just the Beginning with performances in September on Ellen and in October at the Austin City Limits Music Festival, where she was "[o]ne of the fest's biggest breakout acts ... whose soaring voice and sweet pop songs charmed large ... crowds." She performed at more WE Day events in Vancouver, British Columbia, in October and Saint Paul, Minnesota, in November. VanderWaal released Just the Beginning on November 3, 2017. She sang "Moonlight" on Megyn Kelly Today on the release date. The album debuted on the Billboard 200 albums chart at No. 22. She began her first solo concert tour, the Just the Beginning Tour, on November 5, 2017, which ran through February 2018. By September 2017, the tour had sold out. VanderWaal returned to Japan in late November to promote the album. In December, she appeared on the Today show.

In March 2018, VanderWaal traveled to Kenya with the Starkey Hearing Foundation to help hearing-impaired youth there. In April, she performed on The Late Show with Stephen Colbert. She was the opening act for Imagine Dragons in the North American leg of their Evolve World Tour from June to August 2018. During the tour, she also performed on The Late Late Show with James Corden and at the 2018 LoveLoud Festival. In December 2018, she returned to Live with Kelly and Ryan together with Ingrid Michaelson to perform their duet from Songs for the Season of "Rockin' Around the Christmas Tree".

=== 2019–2023: Letters Vol. 1 and Stargirl ===
In early 2019, VanderWaal recorded her first soundtrack song, "Hideaway", for the animated film Wonder Park. She made several tour stops in the southeastern US with Florence and the Machine in June 2019 and gave her own North American tour, titled "Ur So Beautiful", in August and September 2019, with an additional performance in November. Later in the year she performed at The Trevor Project gala to prevent suicide among LGBT youth. She released several songs in 2019 and released an EP, Letters Vol. 1, in November 2019. Music Week described it as "spiky, futuristic, diverse".

In 2020, VanderWaal starred in her acting debut as Susan "Stargirl" Caraway in Disney+'s Stargirl, based on the 2000 novel. Both the film and VanderWaal's performance received positive reviews. Courtney Howard, in Variety, commented: "She ropes us into the mystery of her character reveal with heaping amounts of magnetism and grounded authenticity. It's no surprise that the music-driven scenes really showcase her power". In 2021 and 2022, VanderWaal released a couple of new songs. She reprised the role of Stargirl in Hollywood Stargirl, released on June 3, 2022, on Disney+. Courtney Howard wrote in Variety that "VanderWaal is once again a magnetic presence". In 2023, VanderWaal performed live in Brooklyn, New York, playing unreleased music at two shows.

=== 2024–present: Megalopolis and Childstar ===
VanderWaal played Vesta Sweetwater, "a virginal pop star who gets snagged in a deep-fake sex scandal" in the 2024 film Megalopolis, written and directed by Francis Ford Coppola; VanderWaal wrote two songs for the film, which she performs on the soundtrack. She performed a "raspy, rousing version" of "The Impossible Dream" at the 2024 Kennedy Center Honors, which honored Coppola, among others.

VanderWaal released her second full-length album, Childstar, in April 2025, followed by her Childstar Tour in May. Later in 2025, VanderWaal returned to modelling with a Steve Madden footwear campaign.

== Reception ==
In 2016, a review of 15 of VanderWaal's song covers that she posted on her YouTube channel, praised her arrangements, vocal delivery, musical taste and "the combination of sass, attitude and confidence she brings to every cover". In another 2016 assessment, USA Today characterized her voice as "endearingly croaky". Others called it "raspy" or "timelessly soulful". Lindsay Peoples wrote for New York Magazine: "The songs [VanderWaal] wrote and performed on AGT were not only catchy but emotional and unique to her own sound, a mix of raw and folk". Billboard magazine praised VanderWaal's vocals on her debut EP, Perfectly Imperfect, finding them "reminiscent of a Taylor Swift-Regina Spektor hybrid". Rolling Stone agreed. Brianna Wiest of Teen Vogue wrote: "The EP takes you through Grace's range, touching on issues that are all-too-well-known for young people, as well as soul-stokingly beautiful medleys that almost anyone could relate to. ... [W]e see ... her ability to master both a softer, vowel-breaking folk tone as well as push through a serious power-ballad by the end. It's rare that you see both at once, but that's part of the magic of Grace's sound: it's at once completely new, and totally unexpected."

A review of her album Just the Beginning in USA Today stated: "VanderWaal's big-throated performance on 'A Better Life' channels Florence Welch and Miley Cyrus. There's a certain chirp in VanderWaal's voice that's reminiscent of Swift, but otherwise, her vocals align much more closely to Sia's in her full-voiced belting and nonchalant pronunciations. ... VanderWaal sounds like a 13-year-old in her songs, in the best possible way. In a voice that sounds refreshingly green, she launches herself at huge choruses with a total lack of restraint." A reviewer for The Buffalo News wrote that the "vast diversity in her songwriting ... makes her stand out as a truly unique and exquisite artist." Selina Fragassi of the Chicago Sun-Times commented that, on the album, VanderWaal's "raspy-sweet-peculiar vocals recall Elle King, Regina Spektor and Katy Perry ... [and] proves herself a modern-day Mozart". Critics writing in the Houston Chronicle similarly praised her "smart pop songs that beautifully showcase her persona and wonderfully peculiar rasp of a voice." A reviewer for the Dallas Observer opined that VanderWaal's lyrics tackle "complicated issues with aplomb as her raspy, warbling voice undulates around each syllable."

A reviewer called VanderWaal's Seattle concert in February 2018 "a well balanced set of ballads and full energy songs. ... [H]er stage and style are a boho chic age appropriate complement to her teenage themed, yet old-soul-mind works. ... Her set was full of sweet commentary and incredible vocals". Abby Jones of Billboard wrote that her performance of her single "Clearly" on The Late Show in 2018 was "moving ... stunningly bold ... mature, powerful". A reviewer for Mass Live said of her performance on tour in June 2018 that she "was a pleasant surprise ... holding her own in the arena rock milieu. [She] won over the crowd". Later that month, a tour reviewer noted, in Argus Leader, "her whimsical flower crown, carefree attitude and incredible voice. ... VanderWaal captivated the audience". Another wrote in Milwaukee Journal Sentinel that "VanderWaal is one of the youngest performers at Summerfest [2018]. She's also one of the most talented, bringing a honeyed, slightly frayed rasp to assured pop songs". Bob Boilen of NPR wrote of her 2018 concert at the 9:30 Club in Washington, D.C. that he was "swept away by her performance. It was a dazzling show that felt fresh, sincere, bold but also simple".

A reviewer in Vanity Fair called VanderWaal's 2019 single, "Stray", "contemplative, haunting ... ["Stray" and "Hideaway" are] mature and grounded – a progression from her previous work". A Rolling Stone critic found her 2019 single "Waste My Time" "a major departure for the teen. ... The more mature track is dream-pop bliss". MTV's critic called the 2019 music video for her song "I Don't Like You" "a sharp portrait [that] ... represents the chaos, confusion, and anger we often feel in relationships. ... In a style reminiscent of Sia's best videos ... with such deep-cutting lyrics ... and sharp visuals". V magazine called her 2022 song "Lion's Den" "relatable and poignant ... a resounding cry for her generation. ... It's a powerful, unfiltered story of someone coming into their own, told with unflinching honesty and candidness." In 2023, an NBC review said that VanderWaal "has the voice of an angel", called her song "Boyfriend" "deep" and "emotional", and said that her cover of Amy Winehouse's "Wake Up Alone" "sounds heavenly".

Of her 2024 single "What's Left of Me", one reviewer wrote: "Driven by her gripping vocals, it's a raw track". Upon the release of Childstar the following year, Olivia Hogan of Melodic magazine wrote: "I was astonished by the album’s production and lyricism. Grace ... used it as a powerful vehicle to tell her story ... with a wide range of sounds that keep listeners engaged throughout. ... The album is vulnerable, courageous, and authentic." Khushboo Malhotra of CelebMix wrote: "Childstar is a hauntingly poetic excavation of identity, autonomy, and the aching complexity of coming of age under a spotlight you never asked for. ... VanderWaal doesn’t just sing here – she aches, whispers, and claws her way". The album release was accompanied by a choreographed short film on VanderWaal's YouTube channel titled "Childstar: Final Act", visually interpreting five of the songs: "it’s part performance art, part soul exorcism." Sarah M. Stone of WhereIsThe Buzz described her as "one of her generation’s most magnetic storytellers" and called her 2024 single, "High", "an anthem that is essentially a sunbeam bottled up. ... [A] meditation on life's most delicate treasures, the fleeting, perfect moments that feel timeless, even as they slip through our fingers. ... VanderWaal’s voice, tender yet weighted with wisdom, folds nostalgia and longing into something ethereal."

== Accolades ==
Billboard magazine named VanderWaal to its 21 Under 21 list of "music's hottest young stars" in four consecutive years, 2016–2019 and again in 2021. Variety listed her in its "Young Hollywood Impact Report 2017". She was a finalist in the Best Female Artist category at the International Acoustic Music Awards in 2017, the youngest finalist in the awards' history. VanderWaal won the 2017 Radio Disney Music Award for Best New Artist and a 2017 Teen Choice Award. Refinery29 included her on its 2017 list of 29 young actors, singers and activists "on the verge of superstardom." VanderWaal is credited with helping to boost the popularity of the ukulele, and in 2017, Fender named her as its youngest Signature Series artist ever and its first collaboration with a ukulele player; the instrument line was released in 2018. VanderWaal received Billboard's 2017 Women in Music Rising Star Award and the 2018 MTV Europe Music Award for Best Push Artist. She is the youngest person ever included in the Forbes 30 Under 30 music list. In 2019 the New York State Senate awarded her its Women of Distinction honor for her efforts to expand musical education in the East Ramapo Central School District.

By 2024, VanderWaal had accumulated more than thirteen million followers on social media. As of 2024, her Instagram account has more than six million followers, her YouTube channel has more than three million subscribers, and her Facebook page more than one million followers.

=== Awards and nominations ===
Year	Award	Category	Result	Ref.
2016	America's Got Talent		Won	
2017	Radio Disney Music Awards	Best New Artist	Won	
2017	Teen Choice Awards	Choice Next Big Thing	Won	
2017	Billboard Women in Music	Rising Star Award	Won	
2018	Radio Disney Music Awards	Best Song That Makes You Smile	Nominated	
2018	MTV Europe Music Awards	Best Push Act	Won	
2018	32nd Japan Gold Disc Awards	New Artist of the Year, Best 3 New Artists	Won	

== Discography ==
=== Albums ===
List of albums, with selected chart positions
Title	Details	Peak chart positions					
Title	Details	US	AUS	BEL (FL)	BEL (WA)	CAN	JPN
Just the Beginning	Released: November 3, 2017; Label: Columbia; Format: CD, digital download	22	60	118	107	20	37
Childstar	Released: April 4, 2025; Label: Pulse Records; Format: CD, vinyl, digital download	—	—	—	—	—	—

=== EPs ===
List of albums, with selected chart positions
Title	EP details	Peak chart positions	
Title	EP details	US	CAN
Perfectly Imperfect	Released: December 2, 2016; Label: Columbia; Format: CD, digital download	9	11
Letters Vol. 1	Released: November 22, 2019; Label: Columbia; Format: CD, digital download	—	—

=== Charted singles ===
List of nationally charting singles, with selected chart positions
Title	Year	Peak chart positions					Album
Title	Year	US Bub.	AUS	BEL (FL) Tip	BEL (WA) Tip	JPN	Album
"I Don't Know My Name"	2016	24	82	—	—	—	Perfectly Imperfect
"Moonlight"	2017	—	—	—	3	—	Just the Beginning
"So Much More Than This"	2017	—	—	—	16	43	Just the Beginning
"Ur So Beautiful"	2019	—	—	45	—	—	Letters Vol. 1
"—" denotes that recording did not chart or was not released in that territory.

== Filmography ==
=== Film ===
List of films
Year	Title	Role(s)	Notes	Ref.
2020	Stargirl	Susan "Stargirl" Caraway	Streaming film	
2022	Hollywood Stargirl	Susan "Stargirl" Caraway	Streaming film	
2024	Megalopolis	Vesta Sweetwater		

== Tours ==
=== Headlining ===
- Just the Beginning Tour (2017–2018)
- Ur So Beautiful Tour (2019)
- Childstar Tour (2025)

=== Opening act ===
- Imagine Dragons – Evolve World Tour (2018)
- Florence and the Machine – High as Hope Tour (2019)

== Notes ==
Preceded by Paul Zerdin	America's Got Talent winner Season 11 (Summer 2016)	Succeeded by Darci Lynne
