= KIIS-FM Jingle Ball =

Annual concert produced by KIIS-FM radio station

Jingle Ball
- Genre: Pop, rock, hip hop, R&B
- Dates: Throughout December pre-holidays
- Location: U.S.
- Years active: 1995–2019, 2021–present
- Founders: WHTZ
- Organiser: iHeartRadio
- Website: KIIS-FM Jingle Ball

The KIIS-FM Jingle Ball (also referred to as just Jingle Ball) is an annual concert produced by the Los Angeles radio station KIIS-FM that takes place in early-to-mid December. Since 2000, the concert series has been staged at various venues around Southern California, including the Shrine Auditorium and Staples Center in Los Angeles, and Honda Center in Anaheim.

iHeartMedia sister stations in other cities, such as WHYI in Miami, WXKS in Boston, and WIOQ in Philadelphia have also hosted Jingle Balls of their own since 2011 as part of the iHeartRadio Jingle Ball Tour series. From 2013 to 2022, the concert aired on The CW. From 2023 to the present day, the concert aired on ABC.

== History ==
The "Jingle Ball" concept and branding evolved from Top 40 radio station WHTZ (Z100)'s December 1994 "Acoustic Christmas" concert. The December concerts replaced WHTZ's annual "birthday celebration" summer concerts (1984–1993). The inaugural Z100 "Jingle Ball" concert was presented on December 15, 1995, at the IZOD Center in East Rutherford, New Jersey.

== List of concerts ==
Headlining acts are highlighted in bold where known.

=== 2000 ===
Held at Shrine Auditorium on December 16, 2000.

- K-Ci & JoJo
- Christina Aguilera
- Third Eye Blind (with an appearance by Stevie Wonder)
- Bon Jovi
- Macy Gray
- 98 Degrees

=== 2001 ===
Held at Staples Center on December 19, 2001.

- **Alicia Keys**
- Shakira
- Sugar Ray
- LFO
- Michelle Branch
- Craig David
- Toya

=== 2002 ===
Held at Honda Center on December 19, 2002.

- **Kylie Minogue**
- **Mariah Carey**
- Destiny's Child
- Justin Timberlake
- Goo Goo Dolls
- Avril Lavigne
- Kelly Osbourne
- Nick Carter
- Paul Oakenfold

=== 2003 ===
Held at Staples Center on December 5, 2003.

- **Britney Spears**
- Beyoncé
- Jessica Simpson
- Sean Paul
- Kelly Clarkson
- Hilary Duff
- Fabolous
- Thalía
- Simple Plan
- Jennifer Lopez

=== 2004 ===
Held at Honda Center on December 3, 2004.

- **Avril Lavigne**
- Gwen Stefani
- Ashlee Simpson
- Snoop Dogg
- Alicia Keys
- Maroon 5 (acoustic performance)
- Christina Milian
- JoJo

=== 2005 ===
Held at Shrine Auditorium on December 6, 2005.

- **Shakira**
- Sean Paul
- Frankie J
- Chris Brown
- Rihanna
- The Pussycat Dolls

=== 2006 ===
Held at Honda Center on December 7, 2006.

- **RBD**
- Nelly Furtado with Timbaland and special guest Justin Timberlake
- Bow Wow
- Danity Kane
- JoJo
- Vanessa Hudgens

=== 2007 ===
Held at Honda Center on October 27, 2007.

- **Gwen Stefani**
- Timbaland with Keri Hilson and OneRepublic
- Fabolous
- Lloyd
- Nicole Scherzinger
- Sean Kingston

It was known as KIIS FM'S Homecoming instead of Jingle Ball because of Gwen Stefani coming back to her hometown.

=== 2008 ===
Held at Honda Center on December 6, 2008.

- Jesse McCartney
- Chris Brown (with a special appearance by Rihanna for a duet performance of "Umbrella")
- Katy Perry
- The Pussycat Dolls
- Estelle
- Tokio Hotel
- Menudo
- Akon
- David Banner
- Colby O'Donis
- BoA

=== 2009 ===
Held at Nokia Theatre L.A. Live on December 5, 2009.

- Taylor Swift
- Keri Hilson
- Fabolous
- The Ting Tings
- 3OH!3
- LMFAO
- Jay Sean
- Jason Derulo

=== 2010 ===
Held at Nokia Theatre L.A. Live on December 5, 2010.

- B.o.B
- Bruno Mars
- DJ Pauly D
- Enrique Iglesias
- Far East Movement
- Katy Perry
- Mike Posner
- Nelly
- Paramore
- Selena Gomez & the Scene
- Taio Cruz
- Travie McCoy

=== 2011 ===
Held at Nokia Theatre L.A. Live on December 3, 2011, headlined by Lady Gaga. Other performers included:

- David Guetta
- Flo Rida
- Sean Paul
- Gym Class Heroes
- Taio Cruz
- Nick Cannon
- Big Time Rush
- Karmin
- Mindless Behavior

=== 2012 ===
Held at the following locations:

- Fox Theatre, Detroit, MI - November 24, 2012 / Channel 95.5
- Nokia Theatre at L.A. Live, Los Angeles, CA - December 1 & 3, 2012 / 102.7 KIIS FM
- Xcel Energy Center, St. Paul. MN - December 4, 2012 / 101.3 KDWB
- Wells Fargo Center, Philadelphia, PA - December 5, 2012 / Q102
- TD Garden, Boston, MA - December 6, 2012 / Kiss 108
- Madison Square Garden, New York, NY - December 7, 2012 / Z100
- BB&T Center, Sunrise, FL - December 8, 2012 / Y100
- Tampa Bay Times Forum, Tampa, FL - December 9, 2012 / 93.3 FLZ
- Patriot Center, Fairfax, VA - December 11, 2012 / Hot 99.5
- Phillips Arena, Atlanta, GA - December 12, 2012 / Power 96.1
- Warfield Theatre, San Francisco, CA - December 14, 2012 / Star 101.3
- WaMu Theater, Seattle, WA - December 16, 2012 / 106.1 KISS FM (Seattle)

==== Performers ====
- 3OH!3 (Seattle)
- Adam Lambert (San Francisco)
- Afrojack (Los Angeles, Sunrise, Seattle)
- Alex Clare (Boston, Seattle)
- Austin Mahone (Detroit, Sunrise, Fairfax, Atlanta)
- B.o.B. (New York)
- Bridgit Mendler (Detroit, Philadelphia, Boston, New York, Tampa, Atlanta)
- Calvin Harris (Seattle)
- Cher Lloyd (St. Paul, Philadelphia, New York, Sunrise, Fairfax, Seattle)
- Conor Maynard (St. Paul)
- DJ Beatboy (Detroit)
- Ed Sheeran (St. Paul, Philadelphia, Boston, New York, Sunrise, Tampa, Fairfax, Seattle)
- Ellie Goulding (Los Angeles, St. Paul, Fairfax)
- Enrique Iglesias (Sunrise, Atlanta)
- Flo Rida (Detroit, Los Angeles, Sunrise, Fairfax, Atlanta)
- Fun (Los Angeles, New York, Sunrise)
- Hedley (San Francisco)
- Jason Mraz (New York)
- Jonas Brothers (Los Angeles)
- Justin Bieber (Los Angeles, Philadelphia, Boston, New York, Tampa, Fairfax, Atlanta)
- Karmin (Philadelphia, Sunrise)
- Kesha (Los Angeles, Sunrise, Fairfax, Atlanta)
- Megan & Liz (Detroit, Sunrise)
- Ne-Yo (Los Angeles, New York)
- Neon Trees (Sunrise)
- Olly Murs (Philadelphia, New York)
- One Direction (New York)
- OneRepublic (Los Angeles, St. Paul, Philadelphia, Sunrise, San Francisco)
- Owl City (Los Angeles, St. Paul, Atlanta, Seattle)
- Psy (Los Angeles, St. Paul, Philadelphia, Sunrise, Fairfax)
- Sammy Adams (Detroit, Los Angeles)
- Sean Kingston (Tampa)
- Taylor Swift (Los Angeles, New York)
- The Wanted (Detroit, Los Angeles, Philadelphia, Boston, New York)
- Train (St. Paul, Boston)
- Walk the Moon (Tampa)
- Will.i.am (Los Angeles)
- Zedd (Los Angeles, Sunrise, Tampa)

=== 2013 ===
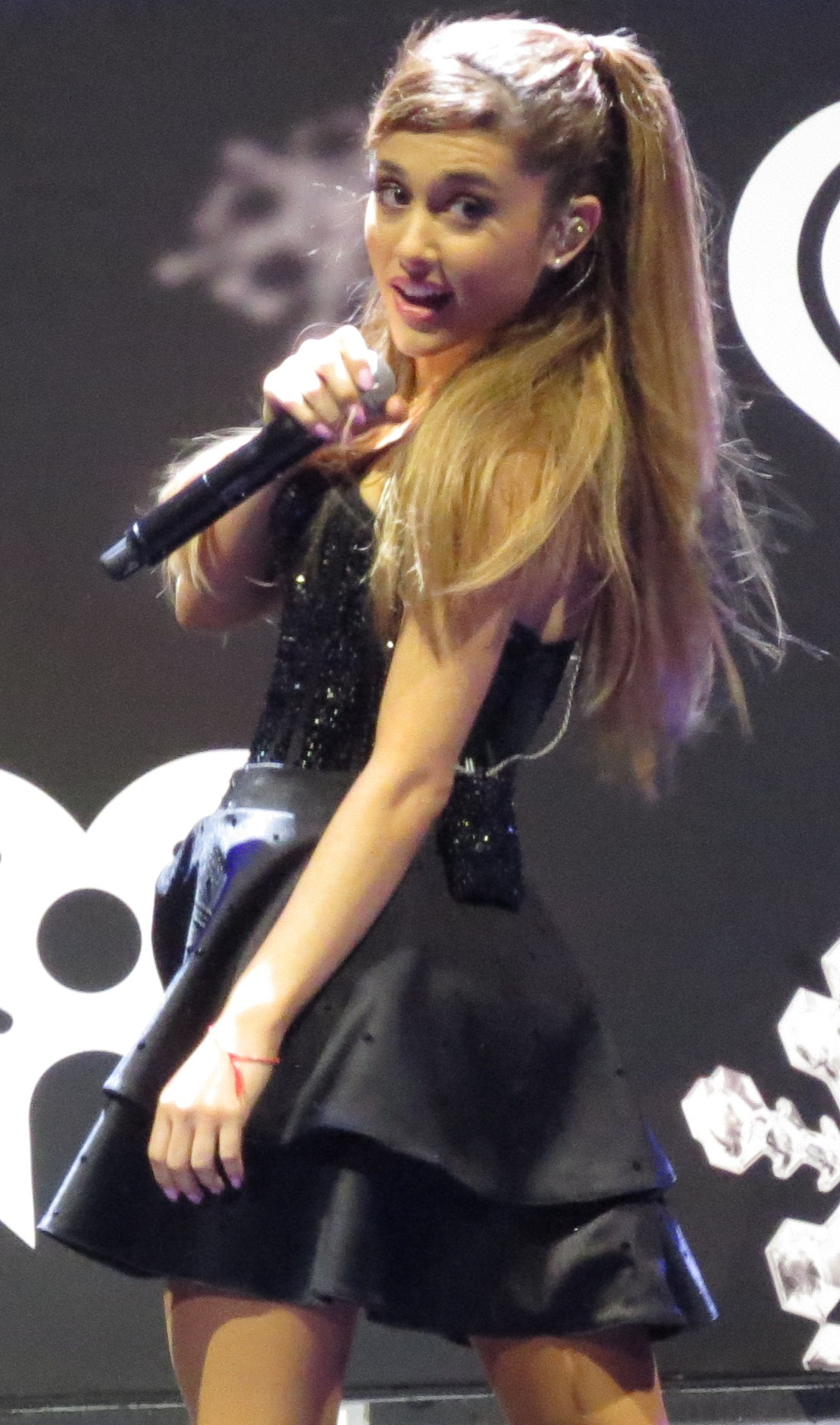
Grande performing at the 2013 Jingle Ball

Held at the following locations:

- American Airlines Center, Dallas, TX - December 2, 2013 / 106.1 KISS FM (Dallas) - KDAF CW 33
- Wells Fargo Center, Philadelphia, PA - December 4, 2013 / Q102 - WPSG CW 57
- Staples Center, Los Angeles, CA - December 6, 2013 / 102.7 KIIS FM - KTLA CW 5
- Comcast Arena, Everett, WA - December 8, 2013 / 106.1 KISS FM (Seattle) - KSTW CW 11
- United Center, Chicago, IL - December 9, 2013 / 103.5 KISS FM - WGN-TV CW 9
- Xcel Energy Center, St. Paul, MN - December 10, 2013 / 101.3 KDWB - WUCW CW 23
- Phillips Arena, Atlanta, GA - December 11, 2013 / Power 96.1 - WUPA CW 69
- Madison Square Garden, New York, NY - December 13, 2013 / Z100 - WPIX CW 11
- TD Garden - Boston, MA, December 14, 2013 / Kiss 108 - WLVI CW 56
- Verizon Center, Washington, DC - December 16, 2013 / Hot 99.5 - WDCW CW 50
- Tampa Bay Times Forum, Tampa, FL - December 18, 2013 / 93.3 FLZ - WTOG CW 44
- BB&T Center, Sunrise, FL - December 20, 2013 / Y100 - WSFL-TV CW 39

==== Performers ====
- Ariana Grande (Dallas, Los Angeles, St. Paul, New York, Tampa, Sunrise)
- Armin van Buuren (Atlanta)
- Austin Mahone (Dallas, Los Angeles, Everett, St. Paul, New York, Washington, DC, Tampa)
- Avril Lavigne (Philadelphia, Chicago, Sunrise)
- Bonnie McKee (Atlanta)
- Demi Lovato (Sunrise)
- Enrique Iglesias (Dallas, Los Angeles, Chicago, St. Paul, Atlanta, New York, Boston, Washington, DC, Tampa, Sunrise)
- Fall Out Boy (Everett, St. Paul, New York, Boston, Washington, DC)
- Fifth Harmony (Dallas, Philadelphia, Los Angeles, Everett, Chicago, St. Paul, Atlanta, New York, Boston, Washington, DC, Tampa, Sunrise)
- Flo Rida (Dallas, Philadelphia, Everett, Chicago, St. Paul, Atlanta, Boston, Washington, DC, Tampa)
- Icona Pop (Everett, Chicago)
- Jason Derulo (Dallas, Philadelphia, Los Angeles, New York, Washington, DC, Tampa, Sunrise)
- Macklemore & Ryan Lewis (Los Angeles, New York)
- Miley Cyrus (Los Angeles, St. Paul, Atlanta, New York, Washington, DC, Tampa, Sunrise)
- New Politics (Los Angeles, Everett)
- OneRepublic (Dallas)
- Paramore (Philadelphia, Los Angeles, Everett, Chicago, New York, Boston, Washington, DC)
- Pitbull (Atlanta, New York)
- Robin Thicke (Dallas, Los Angeles, Chicago, St. Paul, Atlanta, New York, Boston, Tampa)
- Selena Gomez (Dallas, Los Angeles, Everett, New York, Boston)
- T.I. (Los Angeles)
- Tegan and Sara (Tampa)
- Travie McCoy (Los Angeles, Everett, Chicago, Atlanta, Tampa)

=== 2014 ===
Held at the following locations:

- Verizon Theatre at Grand Prairie, Grand Prairie, TX - November 30, 2014 / 106.1 KISS FM (Dallas) - KDAF CW 33
- Moore Theatre, Seattle, WA - December 2, 2014 / 106.1 KISS FM (Seattle) - KSTW CW 11
- Staples Center, Los Angeles, CA - December 5, 2014 / 102.7 KIIS FM - KTLA CW 5
- Xcel Energy Center, St. Paul, MN - December 8, 2014 / 101.3 KDWB - WUCW CW 23
- Wells Fargo Center, Philadelphia, PA - December 10, 2014 / Q102 - WPSG CW 57
- Madison Square Garden, New York, NY - December 12, 2014 / Z100 - WPIX CW 11
- TD Garden, Boston, MA - December 14, 2014 / Kiss 108 - WLVI CW 56
- Verizon Center, Washington, DC - December 15, 2014 / Hot 99.5 - WDCW CW 50
- Allstate Arena, Rosemont, IL - December 18, 2014 / 103.5 KISS FM - WGN-TV CW 9
- The Arena at Gwinnett Center, Duluth, GA - December 19, 2014 / Power 96.1 - WUPA CW 69
- BB&T Center, Sunrise, FL - December 21, 2014 / Y100 - WSFL-TV CW 39
- Amalie Arena, Tampa, FL - December 22, 2014 / 93.3 FLZ - WTOG CW 44

==== Performers ====
- 5 Seconds of Summer (Los Angeles, New York, Boston, Washington, DC)
- Ariana Grande (Los Angeles, St. Paul, Philadelphia, New York, Washington, DC, Sunrise)
- Becky G (Los Angeles, St. Paul, Rosemont, Sunrise)
- Calvin Harris (New York, Boston, Washington, DC, Rosemont, Duluth, Sunrise, Tampa)
- Charli XCX (Los Angeles, New York, Boston, Washington, DC, Rosemont, Sunrise, Tampa)
- Demi Lovato (St. Paul, Washington, DC, Rosemont, Tampa)
- Echosmith (Dallas)
- Fall Out Boy (Dallas, Rosemont, Duluth, Tampa)
- Fences (Seattle)
- Hoodie Allen (Duluth)
- Iggy Azalea (Los Angeles, St. Paul, Philadelphia, New York, Boston, Washington, DC, Rosemont, Sunrise)
- Jake Miller (Dallas, Seattle, Sunrise, Tampa)
- Jason Derulo (Dallas, Washington, DC, Sunrise, Tampa)
- Jeremih (Dallas, Duluth)
- Jessie J (Los Angeles, St. Paul, Philadelphia, New York, Boston, Washington, DC, Rosemont, Duluth, Sunrise, Tampa)
- Kiesza (Los Angeles, St. Paul, Philadelphia, Boston, Washington, DC, Rosemont, Sunrise, Tampa)
- Lil Jon (Boston, Washington, DC)
- Lindsey Stirling (Seattle)
- Magic! (Dallas, Seattle, Boston, Rosemont, Sunrise, Tampa)
- Maroon 5 (New York)
- Mary Lambert (Seattle, Sunrise)
- Meghan Trainor (Dallas, Los Angeles, St. Paul, Philadelphia, New York, Boston, Washington, DC, Rosemont, Sunrise, Tampa)
- Nick Jonas (Dallas, Los Angeles, Philadelphia, New York, Rosemont, Sunrise, Tampa)
- Nico & Vinz (St. Paul)
- OneRepublic (St. Paul, Philadelphia, New York, Boston, Washington, DC, Rosemont)
- Pharrell Williams (Los Angeles, New York, Sunrise, Tampa)
- Rita Ora (Los Angeles, St. Paul, Philadelphia, New York, Washington, DC, Rosemont)
- Rixton (Seattle, Los Angeles, Philadelphia, New York, Boston, Washington, DC, Sunrise, Tampa)
- Sam Smith (Los Angeles, Philadelphia, New York)
- Shawn Mendes (Los Angeles, St. Paul, Philadelphia, New York, Boston, Washington, DC, Rosemont, Sunrise, Tampa)
- Taylor Swift (Los Angeles, New York)
- T.I. (Duluth)

=== 2015 ===
Held at the following locations:

- American Airlines Center, Dallas, TX - December 1, 2015 / 106.1 KISS FM - KDAF CW 33
- Oracle Arena, Oakland, CA - December 3, 2015 / Wild 94.9 - KBCW CW 44
- Staples Center, Los Angeles, CA - December 4, 2015 / 102.7 KIIS FM - KTLA CW 5
- Xcel Energy Center, St. Paul, MN - December 7, 2015 / 101.3 KDWB - WUCW CW 23
- Wells Fargo Center, Philadelphia, PA - December 9, 2015 / Q102 - WPSG CW 57
- TD Garden, Boston, MA - December 10, 2015 / Kiss 108 - WLVI CW 56
- Madison Square Garden, New York, NY - December 11, 2015 / Z100 - WPIX CW 11
- Verizon Center, Washington, DC - December 14, 2015 / Hot 99.5 - WDCW CW 50
- Allstate Arena, Rosemont, IL - December 16, 2015 / 103.5 KISS FM - WGN-TV CW 9
- Phillips Arena, Atlanta, GA - December 17, 2015 / Power 96.1 - WUPA CW 69
- BB&T Center, Sunrise, FL - December 18, 2015 / Y100 - WSFL-TV CW 39
- Amalie Arena, Tampa, FL - December 19, 2015 / 93.3 FLZ - WTOG CW 44

==== Performers ====
- 5 Seconds of Summer (Dallas, Los Angeles, Philadelphia, Boston, New York, Washington, DC, Tampa)
- Alessia Cara (Oakland, Philadelphia, Washington, DC, Tampa)
- Becky G (St. Paul)
- Calvin Harris (Dallas, Oakland, St. Paul, Philadelphia, Boston, New York)
- Charlie Puth (Dallas, Los Angeles, St. Paul, Philadelphia, New York, Washington, DC, Rosemont, Atlanta, Sunrise, Tampa)
- Conrad Sewell (Oakland, Philadelphia, New York, Tampa)
- Demi Lovato (Dallas, Oakland, St. Paul, Boston, New York, Washington, DC, Sunrise, Tampa)
- DNCE (Dallas, Oakland, Los Angeles, St. Paul, New York, Atlanta, Sunrise, Tampa)
- Ellie Goulding (Dallas, Los Angeles)
- Fall Out Boy (St. Paul)
- Fetty Wap (New York)
- Fifth Harmony (New York, Rosemont, Atlanta, Sunrise)
- Hailee Steinfield (Los Angeles, St. Paul, Philadelphia, Boston, New York, Washington, DC, Rosemont, Atlanta, Sunrise, Tampa)
- Justin Bieber (Atlanta)
- Natalie La Rose (Philadelphia, Washington, DC)
- Nick Jonas (Oakland, St. Paul, Boston, New York, Atlanta, Sunrise, Tampa)
- One Direction (Dallas, Los Angeles)
- R. City (Oakland, St. Paul, Philadelphia, New York, Washington, DC, Tampa)
- Selena Gomez (Oakland, Los Angeles, Philadelphia, New York, Rosemont)
- Shawn Mendes (Dallas, Oakland, Los Angeles, St. Paul, Philadelphia, New York, Washington, DC, Atlanta, Sunrise, Tampa)
- The Chainsmokers (Atlanta)
- The Weeknd (Los Angeles, Boston, New York, Sunrise)
- Tove Lo (Dallas, Oakland, Los Angeles, St. Paul, Philadelphia, Boston, New York, Washington, DC, Sunrise, Tampa)
- Zedd (Dallas, Los Angeles, St. Paul, New York, Washington, DC, Sunrise, Tampa)

=== 2016 ===
Held at the following locations:

- American Airlines Center, Dallas, TX - November 29, 2016 / 106.1 KISS FM - KDAF CW 33
- SAP Center, San Jose, CA - December 1, 2016 / Wild 94.9 - KBCW CW 44
- Staples Center, Los Angeles, CA - December 2, 2016 / 102.7 KIIS FM - KTLA CW 5
- Xcel Energy Center, St. Paul, MN - December 5, 2016 / 101.3 KDWB - WUCW CW 23
- Wells Fargo Center, Philadelphia, PA - December 7, 2016 / Q102 - WPSG CW 57
- Madison Square Garden, New York, NY - December 9, 2016 / Z100 - WPIX CW 11
- TD Garden, Boston, MA - December 11, 2016 / Kiss 108 - WLVI CW 56
- Verizon Center, Washington, DC - December 12, 2016 / Hot 99.5 - WDCW CW 50
- Allstate Arena, Rosemont, IL - December 14, 2016 / 103.5 KISS FM / WPWR-TV CW 50
- Phillips Arena, Atlanta, GA - December 16, 2016 / Power 96.1 - WUPA CW 69
- Amalie Arena, Tampa, FL - December 17, 2016 / 93.3 FLZ - WTOG CW 44
- BB&T Center, Sunrise, FL - December 18, 2016 / Y100 - WSFL-TV CW 39

==== Performers ====
- Alessia Cara (Dallas, San Jose, Los Angeles, St. Paul, Philadelphia, Boston, Washington, DC, Atlanta, Sunrise)
- Ariana Grande (New York, Boston, Rosemont, Atlanta)
- Backstreet Boys (Dallas, St. Paul, Rosemont)
- Britney Spears (Los Angeles)
- Bruno Mars (Los Angeles)
- Charlie Puth (Dallas, San Jose, Philadelphia, New York, Sunrise)
- Daya (Dallas, San Jose, Los Angeles, Boston, Washington, DC, Rosemont, Atlanta, Tampa)
- Diplo (San Jose, Los Angeles, St. Paul, Philadelphia, New York, Boston, Washington, DC, Sunrise)
- DNCE (Philadelphia, New York, Boston, Washington, DC, Atlanta, Tampa)
- Ellie Goulding (Philadelphia, New York, Boston, Washington, DC, Rosemont)
- Fifth Harmony (Dallas, Los Angeles, St. Paul, Philadelphia, New York, Washington, DC, Atlanta, Tampa, Sunrise)
- G-Eazy (St. Paul, Washington, DC)
- Gnash (St. Paul)
- Hailee Steinfeld (Dallas, St. Paul, New York, Rosemont, Sunrise)
- Hey Violet (Los Angeles)
- Jon Bellion (St. Paul)
- Justin Bieber (Los Angeles, New York)
- Los 5 (Los Angeles)
- Lukas Graham (Dallas, San Jose, Los Angeles, St. Paul, Philadelphia, New York, Rosemont, Atlanta, Tampa, Sunrise)
- Machine Gun Kelly (New York, Washington, DC, Atlanta, Sunrise)
- Martin Garrix (Tampa)
- Meghan Trainor (Dallas, Los Angeles, New York)
- MØ (St. Paul, New York)
- Niall Horan (San Jose, Los Angeles, New York, Boston, Washington, DC, Rosemont)
- Nicky Jam (Sunrise)
- Pitbull (Tampa)
- Sabrina Carpenter (Los Angeles, Philadelphia, Tampa)
- Shawn Mendes (Philadelphia, Boston)
- The Chainsmokers (Dallas, New York, Washington, DC, Atlanta, Tampa, Sunrise)
- Tove Lo (San Jose, St. Paul, Philadelphia, Boston, Washington, DC, Rosemont, Sunrise)
- Zara Larsson (Los Angeles)

=== 2017 ===
Held at the following locations:

- American Airlines Center, Dallas, TX - November 28, 2017 / 106.1 KISS FM - KDAF CW 33
- SAP Center, San Jose, CA - November 30, 2017 / Wild 94.9 - KBCW CW 44
- The Forum, Inglewood, CA - December 1, 2017 / 102.7 KIIS FM - KTLA CW 5
- Xcel Energy Center, St. Paul, MN - December 4, 2017 / 101.3 KDWB - WUCW CW 23
- Wells Fargo Center, Philadelphia, PA - December 6, 2017 / Q102 - WPSG CW 57
- Madison Square Garden, New York, NY - December 8, 2017 / Z100 - WPIX CW 11
- TD Garden, Boston, MA - December 10, 2017 / Kiss 108 - WLVI CW 56
- Capital One Arena, Washington, DC - December 11, 2017 / Hot 99.5 - WDCW CW 50
- Allstate Arena, Rosemont, IL - December 13, 2017 / 103.5 KISS FM - WPWR-TV CW 50
- Phillips Arena, Atlanta, GA - December 15, 2017 / Power 96.1 - WUPA CW 69
- Amalie Arena, Tampa, FL - December 16, 2017 / 93.3 FLZ - WTOG CW 44
- BB&T Center, Sunrise, FL - December 17, 2017 / Y100 - WSFL-TV CW 39

==== Performers ====
- All Time Low (Tampa)
- Camila Cabello (Dallas, San Jose, St. Paul, New York, Boston, Washington, DC, Rosemont, Atlanta, Tampa, Sunrise)
- Charlie Puth (Dallas, San Jose, Inglewood, St. Paul, Philadelphia, New York, Boston, Washington, DC, Rosemont, Atlanta, Tampa, Sunrise)
- Demi Lovato (San Jose, Inglewood, New York, Rosemont, Atlanta, Sunrise)
- Ed Sheeran (Inglewood, New York)
- Fall Out Boy (St. Paul, Philadelphia, New York, Boston, Washington, DC)
- Fifth Harmony (Boston, Atlanta, Sunrise)
- G-Eazy (San Jose, New York)
- Hailee Steinfeld (Dallas, San Jose)
- Halsey (San Jose, Inglewood, St. Paul, Philadelphia, New York, Boston, Washington, DC, Rosemont, Atlanta)
- In Real Life (Inglewood)
- Jake Miller (Tampa)
- James Maslow (Inglewood)
- Julia Michaels (New York, Washington, DC, Rosemont, Atlanta)
- Kelly Clarkson (Boston)
- Kesha (Dallas, Inglewood, St. Paul, Philadelphia, Washington, DC, Rosemont)
- Liam Payne (Dallas, San Jose, Inglewood, St. Paul, Philadelphia, New York, Washington, DC, Rosemont, Atlanta, Tampa)
- Logan Henderson (Tampa)
- Logic (Inglewood, Philadelphia, New York, Washington, DC, Atlanta)
- Max (Boston)
- Niall Horan (Dallas, San Jose, Inglewood, St. Paul, Philadelphia, New York)
- Nick Jonas (San Jose, Atlanta, Tampa)
- Sabrina Carpenter (Dallas, San Jose, Inglewood, St. Paul, Philadelphia, New York, Boston, Washington, DC, Tampa, Sunrise)
- Sam Smith (Inglewood, New York)
- Taylor Swift (Inglewood, New York)
- The Chainsmokers (Dallas, Inglewood, Philadelphia, New York, Rosemont)
- Why Don't We (Dallas, San Jose, Inglewood, St. Paul, Philadelphia, New York, Boston, Washington, DC, Rosemont, Tampa)
- Zedd (Washington, DC, Atlanta, Tampa)

=== 2018 ===
Held at the following locations:

- American Airlines Center, Dallas, TX - November 27, 2018 / 106.1 KISS FM - KDAF CW 33
- The Forum, Inglewood, CA - November 30, 2018 / 102.7 KIIS FM - KTLA CW 5
- Bill Graham Civic Auditorium, San Francisco, CA - December 1, 2018 / Wild 94.9 - KBCW CW 44
- Xcel Energy Center, St. Paul, MN - December 3, 2018 / 101.3 KDWB - WUCW CW 23
- TD Garden, Boston, MA - December 4, 2018 / Kiss 108 - WLVI CW 56
- Wells Fargo Center, Philadelphia, PA - December 5, 2018 / Q102 - WPSG CW 57
- Madison Square Garden, New York, NY - December 7, 2018 / Z100 - WPIX CW 11
- Capital One Arena, Washington, DC - December 10, 2018 / Hot 99.5 - WDCW CW 50
- Allstate Arena, Rosemont, IL - December 12, 2018 / 103.5 KISS FM - WPWR-TV CW 50
- State Farm Arena, Atlanta, GA - December 14, 2018 / Power 96.1 - WUPA CW 69
- Amalie Arena, Tampa, FL - December 15, 2018 / 93.3 FLZ - WTOG CW 44
- BB&T Center, Sunrise, FL - December 16, 2018 / Y100 - WSFL-TV CW 39

==== Performers ====
- 5 Seconds of Summer (San Francisco, St. Paul, Philadelphia)
- Alessia Cara (Dallas, Inglewood, San Francisco, New York, Rosemont, Atlanta, Sunrise)
- Bazzi (Dallas, Inglewood, San Francisco, St. Paul, Boston, Philadelphia, New York, Washington, DC, Rosemont, Atlanta, Tampa, Sunrise)
- Bebe Rexha (Dallas, Inglewood, St. Paul, New York, Washington, DC, Rosemont, Tampa, Sunrise)
- Bryce Vine (Tampa)
- Calvin Harris (Dallas, Inglewood, San Francisco, Philadelphia, New York, Rosemont, Atlanta, Sunrise)
- Camila Cabello (Inglewood, Boston, Philadelphia, New York)
- Cardi B (Inglewood, New York)
- Dua Lipa (Inglewood, Philadelphia, New York, Rosemont)
- Dinah Jane (St. Paul)
- G-Eazy (Inglewood, Boston, Philadelphia, New York, Washington, DC, Atlanta)
- Halsey (St. Paul)
- Jack & Jack (Sunrise)
- Khalid (Inglewood, San Francisco, Boston, New York, Tampa, Sunrise)
- Kim Petras (St. Paul)
- Madison Beer (Inglewood, Sunrise)
- Marc E. Bassy (San Francisco)
- Marshmello (Philadelphia, Atlanta, Tampa, Sunrise)
- Meghan Trainor (Boston, New York, Washington, DC)
- Monsta X (Inglewood, San Francisco, St. Paul, Boston, Philadelphia)
- NF (Dallas, Washington, DC, Tampa)
- Normani (Inglewood)
- Sabrina Carpenter (Dallas, San Francisco, St. Paul, New York, Washington, DC, Rosemont, Atlanta, Tampa. Sunrise)
- Shawn Mendes (Dallas, Inglewood, Boston, Philadelphia, New York, Washington, DC, Rosemont, Atlanta, Tampa, Sunrise)
- The Chainsmokers (St. Paul, Boston, Washington, DC)
- Why Don't We (Dallas)

=== 2019 ===
Held at the following locations:

- Amalie Arena, Tampa, FL - December 1, 2019 / 93.3 FLZ - WTOG CW 44
- Dickies Arena, Fort Worth, TX - December 3, 2019 / 106.1 KISS FM - KDAF CW 33
- The Forum, Inglewood, CA - December 6, 2019 / 102.7 KIIS FM - KTLA CW 5
- SF Masonic Auditorium, San Francisco, CA - December 8, 2019 / Wild 94.9 - KBCW CW 44
- Xcel Energy Center, St. Paul, MN - December 9, 2019 / 101.3 KDWB - WUCW CW 23
- Wells Fargo Center, Philadelphia, PA - December 11, 2019 / Q102 - WPSG CW 57
- Madison Square Garden, New York, NY - December 13, 2019 / Z100 - WPIX CW 11
- TD Garden, Boston, MA - December 15, 2019 / Kiss 108 - WLVI CW 56
- Capital One Arena, Washington, DC - December 16, 2019 / Hot 99.5 - WDCW CW 50
- Allstate Arena, Rosemont, IL - December 18, 2019 / 103.5 KISS FM - WCIU-TV CW 26
- State Farm Arena, Atlanta, GA - December 20, 2019 / Power 96.1 - WUPA CW 69
- BB&T Center, Sunrise, FL - December 22, 2019 / Y100 - WSFL-TV CW 39

==== Performers ====
- 5 Seconds of Summer (St. Paul, Philadelphia, New York, Boston)
- AJ Mitchell (Tampa, Sunrise)
- AJR (Rosemont)
- Billie Eilish (Inglewood)
- BTS (Inglewood)
- Camila Cabello (Fort Worth, Inglewood, St. Paul, New York)
- Charlie Puth (Fort Worth, San Francisco, Boston, Washington, DC)
- CNCO (Sunrise)
- Dan + Shay (New York)
- Fletcher (New York)
- Halsey (Inglewood, Philadelphia, Boston, Washington, DC)
- Jonas Brothers (New York, Rosemont, Atlanta, Sunrise)
- Katy Perry (Inglewood, St. Paul)
- Khalid (Washington, DC, Atlanta, Sunrise)
- Lauv (Fort Worth, St. Paul, New York)
- Lewis Capaldi (Philadelphia, New York, Washington, DC, Rosemont, Atlanta)
- Lil Nas X (San Francisco)
- Lizzo (Tampa, Fort Worth, Inglewood, New York, Boston)
- Max (Tampa)
- Monsta X (Philadelphia, New York)
- NF (Rosemont)
- Niall Horan (Philadelphia, New York, Boston, Washington, DC, Rosemont, Atlanta, Sunrise)
- Normani (Tampa, Inglewood)
- Ozuna (Sunrise)
- Quinn XCII (San Francisco)
- Sam Smith (Tampa, Fort Worth, Inglewood)
- Spencer Sutherland (Tampa)
- Taylor Swift (New York)
- Why Don't We (Fort Worth, St. Paul, Philadelphia, Boston, Washington, DC, Rosemont, Atlanta, Sunrise)
- Zara Larsson (Rosemont, Atlanta, Sunrise)

=== 2020 ===
In light of the COVID-19 pandemic, a virtual livestream of online performances was broadcast instead of an in-person concert, with some artists performing from their homes.

- Billie Eilish
- Clipping
- Doja Cat
- Dua Lipa
- Harry Styles
- Lewis Capaldi
- Sam Smith
- Shawn Mendes
- Why Don't We

=== 2021 ===
Held at the following locations:

- Dickies Arena, Fort Worth, TX - November 30, 2021 / 106.1 KISS FM - KDAF CW 33
- The Forum, Inglewood, CA - December 3, 2021 / 102.7 KIIS FM - KTLA CW 5
- Xcel Energy Center, St. Paul, MN - December 6, 2021 / 101.3 KDWB - WUCW CW 23
- Allstate Arena, Rosemont, IL - December 7, 2021 / 103.5 KISS FM - WCIU-TV CW 26
- Madison Square Garden, New York, NY - December 10, 2021 / Z100 - WPIX CW 11
- Wells Fargo Center, Philadelphia, PA - December 13, 2021 / Q102 - WPSG CW 57
- Capital One Arena, Washington, DC - December 14, 2021 / Hot 99.5 - WDCW CW 50
- State Farm Arena, Atlanta, GA - December 16, 2021 / Power 96.1 - WUPA CW 69

==== Performers ====
- AJR (Fort Worth, Rosemont, New York)
- Anitta (Inglewood)
- Bazzi (Fort Worth, Inglewood, St. Paul, Rosemont, New York, Philadelphia, Washington, DC, Atlanta)
- Big Time Rush (Philadelphia, Atlanta)
- Black Eyed Peas (St. Paul, Rosemont, Philadelphia, Washington, DC)
- BTS (Inglewood)
- Dixie D'Amelio (Fort Worth, Inglewood, St. Paul, Rosemont, New York, Philadelphia, Washington, DC, Atlanta)
- Doja Cat (Fort Worth, Inglewood, Rosemont)
- Ed Sheeran (Inglewood, New York)
- Jonas Brothers (New York, Washington, DC, Atlanta)
- Kane Brown (New York, Philadelphia)
- Lil Nas X (Fort Worth, Inglewood, St. Paul, Rosemont, New York)
- Megan Thee Stallion (Washington, DC, Atlanta)
- Monsta X (Philadelphia, Washington, DC, Atlanta)
- Pitbull (St. Paul)
- Saweetie (Inglewood, St. Paul, Rosemont, New York, Philadelphia, Washington, DC)
- Tai Verdes (Inglewood, St. Paul, New York, Philadelphia, Washington, DC, Atlanta)
- Tate McRae (Fort Worth, Inglewood, St. Paul, Rosemont, New York, Philadelphia, Washington, DC, Atlanta)
- The Kid Laroi (Fort Worth, Inglewood)

=== 2022 ===
Held at the following locations:

- Dickies Arena, Fort Worth, TX - November 29, 2022 / 106.1 KISS FM - KDAF CW 33
- Kia Forum, Inglewood, CA - December 2, 2022 / 102.7 KIIS FM - KTLA CW 5
- Allstate Arena, Rosemont, IL - December 5, 2022 / 103.5 KISS FM - WCIU-TV CW 26
- Little Caesars Arena, Detroit, MI - December 6, 2022 / Channel 95.5 - WKBD-TV CW 50
- Madison Square Garden, New York, NY - December 9, 2022 / Z100 - WPIX CW 11
- TD Garden, Boston, MA - December 11, 2022 / Kiss 108 - WLVI CW 56
- Wells Fargo Center, Philadelphia, PA - December 12, 2022 / Q102 - WPSG CW 57
- Capital One Arena, Washington, DC - December 13, 2022 / Hot 99.5 - WDCW CW 50
- State Farm Arena, Atlanta, GA - December 15, 2022 / Power 96.1 - WUPA CW 69
- Amalie Arena, Tampa, FL - December 16, 2022 / 93.3 FLZ - WTOG CW 44
- FLA Live Arena, Sunrise, FL - December 18, 2022 / Y100 - WSFL-TV CW 39

==== Performers ====
- AJR (Detroit, New York, Philadelphia, Atlanta)
- Anitta (Sunrise)
- Armani White (Detroit)
- Ava Max (Fort Worth, Inglewood, Rosemont, Detroit, New York, Philadelphia, Washington, DC, Atlanta, Tampa, Sunrise)
- Backstreet Boys (Detroit, New York, Boston, Tampa, Sunrise)
- Bebe Rexha (Inglewood)
- Black Eyed Peas (Fort Worth)
- Big Time Rush (Tampa, Sunrise)
- Charlie Puth (New York, Philadelphia, Sunrise)
- Cheat Codes (Tampa)
- Demi Lovato (New York, Boston)
- Dove Cameron (Inglewood, New York, Boston)
- Dua Lipa (Inglewood, New York)
- Flo Rida (Tampa, Sunrise)
- Jack Harlow (Fort Worth, Inglewood, Rosemont, Boston)
- Jax (Fort Worth, Inglewood, Rosemont, Detroit, New York, Boston, Philadelphia, Washington, DC, Tampa, Sunrise)
- Jvke (Inglewood, New York)
- Khalid (Fort Worth, Inglewood, Rosemont, Detroit, Philadelphia, Washington, DC, Atlanta)
- Kim Petras (Atlanta)
- Lauren Spencer-Smith (Fort Worth, Sunrise)
- Lauv (Fort Worth, New York, Boston, Philadelphia, Washington, DC, Atlanta)
- Lewis Capaldi (Fort Worth, Inglewood)
- Lizzo (New York)
- Macklemore (Rosemont, Detroit, Atlanta)
- Nicky Youre (Fort Worth, Inglewood, Rosemont, Detroit, Boston, Philadelphia, Washington, DC, Tampa)
- Pitbull (Inglewood, Rosemont, Washington, DC, Atlanta)
- Sam Smith (Philadelphia, Washington, DC, Atlanta)
- Tate McRae (Rosemont, Detroit, Boston, Philadelphia, Washington, DC, Atlanta, Tampa, Sunrise)
- The Kid Laroi (Detroit, New York, Boston)

=== 2023 ===
Held at the following locations:

- Amalie Arena, Tampa, FL - November 26, 2023 / 93.3 FLZ - WFTS-TV ABC 28
- Dickies Arena, Fort Worth, TX - November 28, 2023 / 106.1 KISS FM - WFAA ABC 8
- Kia Forum, Inglewood, CA - December 1, 2023 / 102.7 KIIS FM - KABC-TV ABC 7
- Allstate Arena, Rosemont, IL - December 4, 2023 / 103.5 KISS FM - WLS-TV ABC 7
- Little Caesars Arena, Detroit, MI - December 5, 2023 / Channel 95.5 - WXYZ-TV ABC 7
- Madison Square Garden, New York, NY - December 8, 2023 / Z100 - WABC-TV ABC 7
- TD Garden, Boston, MA - December 10, 2023 / Kiss 108 - WCVB-TV ABC 5
- Capital One Arena, Washington, DC - December 11, 2023 / Hot 99.5 - WJLA-TV ABC 7
- Wells Fargo Center, Philadelphia, PA - December 12, 2023 / Q102 - WPVI-TV ABC 6
- State Farm Arena, Atlanta, GA - December 14, 2023 / Power 96.1 - WSB-TV ABC 2
- Amerant Bank Arena, Sunrise, FL - December 16, 2023 / Y100 - WPLG ABC 10

==== Performers ====
- (G)I-dle (Inglewood, Rosemont, Detroit, Boston, Washington, DC, Philadelphia)
- AJR (Inglewood, Sunrise)
- AleXa (Fort Worth, Sunrise)
- Big Time Rush (Fort Worth, Rosemont, Detroit, New York, Washington, DC, Philadelphia)
- Cher (New York)
- David Kushner (New York, Boston, Washington, DC, Philadelphia, Atlanta, Sunrise)
- Doechii (Tampa, Fort Worth, Inglewood, Rosemont, Detroit, New York, Washington, DC, Philadelphia)
- Flo Rida (Fort Worth, Inglewood, Detroit, Boston, Washington, DC, Atlanta, Sunrise)
- Ice Spice (Atlanta)
- Jelly Roll (Fort Worth, Rosemont, Detroit, New York, Washington, DC, Philadelphia)
- Jessie Murph (Washington, DC)
- Kaliii (Rosemont, Detroit, Atlanta, Sunrise)
- Kenya Grace (Sunrise)
- LANY (Fort Worth, Sunrise)
- Lawrence (Tampa)
- Lil Durk (Detroit)
- Lil Wayne (Rosemont)
- Ludacris (Sunrise)
- Marshmello (Sunrise)
- Melanie Martinez (New York, Boston, Washington, DC)
- Miguel (Inglewood)
- NCT Dream (Boston, Atlanta)
- Niall Horan (Tampa, Inglewood)
- Nicki Minaj (Atlanta, Sunrise)
- Nicky Jam (Sunrise)
- Olivia Rodrigo (Inglewood, New York)
- OneRepublic (New York, Boston, Washington, DC, Philadelphia)
- P1Harmony (Fort Worth, Inglewood)
- Paul Russell (Tampa, Inglewood, New York, Sunrise)
- Pentatonix (New York)
- Sabrina Carpenter (Inglewood, New York, Boston, Atlanta)
- Shaggy (Fort Worth, Sunrise)
- SZA (New York, Boston)
- Teddy Swims (Tampa, Inglewood)
- Usher (Detroit, Philadelphia)
- Zara Larsson (Tampa)

=== 2024 ===
Held at the following locations:

- Dickies Arena, Fort Worth, TX - December 3, 2024 / 106.1 KISS FM - WFAA ABC 8
- Intuit Dome, Inglewood, CA - December 6, 2024 / 102.7 KIIS FM - KABC-TV ABC 7
- Allstate Arena, Rosemont, IL - December 9, 2024 / 103.5 KISS FM - WLS-TV ABC 7
- Little Caesars Arena, Detroit, MI - December 10, 2024 / Channel 95.5 - WXYZ-TV ABC 7
- Madison Square Garden, New York, NY - December 13, 2024 / Z100 - WABC-TV ABC 7
- TD Garden, Boston, MA - December 15, 2024 / Kiss 108 - WCVB-TV ABC 5
- Wells Fargo Center, Philadelphia, PA - December 16, 2024 / Q102 - WPVI-TV ABC 6
- Capital One Arena, Washington, DC - December 17, 2024 / Hot 99.5 - WJLA-TV ABC 7
- State Farm Arena, Atlanta, GA - December 19, 2024 / 96.1 The Beat - WSB-TV ABC 2
- Kaseya Center, Miami, FL - December 21, 2024 / Y100 - WPLG ABC 10

==== Performers ====
- Benson Boone (Inglewood, Rosemont, New York, Boston, Miami)
- Camila Cabello (Miami)
- Dasha (Fort Worth, Philadelphia, Washington, DC)
- GloRilla (Atlanta)
- Gracie Abrams (New York, Philadelphia, Washington, DC)
- Gunna (Atlanta)
- Isabel LaRosa (Detroit, Washington, DC, Miami)
- Jack Harlow (Rosemont, Detroit)
- Jason Derulo (Fort Worth, Rosemont, Detroit, Philadelphia, Washington, DC, Miami)
- Kane Brown (Fort Worth, Inglewood)
- Katseye (Fort Worth, Boston)
- Katy Perry (New York, Philadelphia)
- Kesha (Boston, Washington, DC)
- Khalid (Atlanta, Miami)
- Madison Beer (Fort Worth, Inglewood, Rosemont, Detroit, New York)
- Meghan Trainor (Fort Worth, Inglewood, New York, Boston, Philadelphia, Washington, DC)
- NCT Dream (Inglewood, Rosemont, Detroit, New York)
- P1Harmony (Washington, DC)
- Paris Hilton (Inglewood)
- Saweetie (Fort Worth, Rosemont, Detroit, Atlanta, Miami)
- Sexyy Red (Atlanta)
- Shaboozey (Fort Worth, Inglewood, New York, Philadelphia)
- SZA (Inglewood)
- T-Pain (Inglewood, Atlanta, Miami)
- T.I. (Atlanta)
- Tate McRae (Inglewood, New York, Boston, Philadelphia, Washington, DC)
- Teddy Swims (Rosemont, Detroit, New York, Philadelphia, Washington, DC)
- The Kid Laroi (New York, Boston, Washington, DC, Atlanta, Miami)
- Tinashe (Atlanta, Miami)
- Twenty One Pilots (New York, Boston)
- Wonho (Fort Worth, Rosemont, Detroit, Miami)

=== 2025 ===
Held at the following locations:

- Dickies Arena, Fort Worth, TX - December 2, 2025 / 106.1 KISS FM - WFAA ABC 8
- Intuit Dome, Inglewood, CA - December 5, 2025 / 102.7 KIIS FM - KABC-TV ABC 7
- Allstate Arena, Rosemont, IL - December 8, 2025 / 103.5 KISS FM - WLS-TV ABC 7
- Little Caesars Arena, Detroit, MI - December 9, 2025 / Channel 95.5 - WXYZ-TV ABC 7
- Madison Square Garden, New York, NY - December 12, 2025 / Z100 - WABC-TV ABC 7
- TD Garden, Boston, MA - December 14, 2025 / Kiss 108 - WCVB-TV ABC 5
- Xfinity Mobile Arena, Philadelphia, PA - December 15, 2025 / Q102 - WPVI-TV ABC 6
- Capital One Arena, Washington, DC - December 16, 2025 / Hot 99.5 - WJLA-TV ABC 7
- State Farm Arena, Atlanta, GA - December 18, 2025 / 96.1 The Beat - WSB-TV ABC 2
- Kaseya Center, Miami, FL - December 20, 2025 / Y100 - WSVN ABC 7.2

==== Performers ====
- AJR (Philadelphia, Washington, DC)
- Alex Warren (Fort Worth, Inglewood, New York, Philadelphia, Washington, DC)
- Audrey Hobert (Inglewood, Rosemont)
- BigXthaPlug (Philadelphia, Atlanta, Miami)
- Belly Gang Kushington (Atlanta)
- BossMan Dlow (Atlanta)
- Conan Gray (Inglewood, Detroit, New York, Washington, DC)
- Ed Sheeran (New York, Boston)
- Feid (Inglewood, Miami)
- Freya Skye (Inglewood, Rosemont, Detroit, Philadelphia, Boston)
- Jackson Wang (Inglewood, Rosemont)
- Jelly Roll (Washington, DC)
- Jermaine Dupri (Atlanta)
- Jessie Murph (Fort Worth, Inglewood, Rosemont, Detroit, New York)
- JO1 (Fort Worth)
- Kehlani (Atlanta, Miami)
- Kevin Woo (Fort Worth, Inglewood, Rosemont, Detroit, New York)
- The Kid Laroi (Inglewood)
- Laufey (New York, Boston, Philadelphia, Washington, DC)
- Leon Thomas (Inglewood)
- Lil Jon (Atlanta)
- Ludacris (Atlanta)
- MGK (Fort Worth, Miami)
- Mariah the Scientist (Atlanta)
- Moliy (Detroit, Boston, Atlanta)
- Monsta X (New York, Philadelphia, Washington, DC, Miami)
- Myles Smith (New York, Boston, Philadelphia, Washington, DC)
- Nelly (Fort Worth, Rosemont, Detroit, New York, Washington, DC, Atlanta, Miami)
- Olivia Dean (Boston, Washington, DC)
- Rachel Chinouriri (Fort Worth, Detroit)
- Ravyn Lenae (Rosemont, Detroit, New York, Boston, Philadelphia)
- Reneé Rapp (Fort Worth, Inglewood, Rosemont, New York)
- Sean Paul (Inglewood, Boston, Miami)
- Shinedown (Fort Worth, Rosemont, Detroit, Washington, DC)
- Teddy Swims (Rosemont)
- Zara Larsson (Fort Worth, Inglewood, Rosemont, Detroit, New York, Boston, Philadelphia, Washington, DC, Miami)
- Ejae, Audrey Nuna and Rei Ami from KPop Demon Hunters (Inglewood)
- A Special Sing-along moment for KPop Demon Hunters (Boston, Philadelphia, Washington, DC, Miami)

=== 2026 ===
Will be held at the following locations:

- Ariat Arena, Fort Worth, TX - December 1, 2026 / 106.1 KISS FM - WFAA ABC 8
- Intuit Dome, Inglewood, CA - December 4, 2026 / 102.7 KIIS FM - KABC-TV ABC 7
- Allstate Arena, Rosemont, IL - December 7, 2026 / 103.5 KISS FM - WLS-TV ABC 7
- Little Caesars Arena, Detroit, MI - December 8, 2026 / Channel 95.5 - WXYZ-TV ABC 7
- Madison Square Garden, New York, NY - December 11, 2026 / Z100 - WABC-TV ABC 7
- TD Garden, Boston, MA - December 13, 2026 / Kiss 108 - WCVB-TV ABC 5
- Capital One Arena, Washington, DC - December 14, 2026 / Hot 99.5 - WJLA-TV ABC 7
- Xfinity Mobile Arena, Philadelphia, PA - December 15, 2026 / Q102 - WPVI-TV ABC 6
- Bridgestone Arena, Nashville, TN - December 17, 2026 / 107.5 The River - WKRN-TV ABC 2

Performers

- Adéla (Boston, Philadelphia)
- Alex Warren (Detroit, New York, Nashville)
- Bella Kay (Inglewood, Detroit, New York)
- Charlie Puth (New York, Philadelphia)
- Dominic Fike (Rosemont)
- Freya Skye (Inglewood, Rosemont, Detroit, New York, Boston)
- Hilary Duff (Inglewood, New York, Boston, Nashville)
- Jason Derulo (Detroit, Philadelphia)
- Jonas Brothers (Washington, DC)
- JYT (Fort Worth, Rosemont, Detroit, Boston, Washington, DC, Philadelphia, Nashville)
- Katseye (Fort Worth)
- Kylie Cantrall (Fort Worth, Washington, DC, Philadelphia)
- Ludacris (Fort Worth, Rosemont, Detroit, Washington, DC, Philadelphia)
- Myles Smith (Fort Worth)
- Nickelback (Boston, Washington, DC, Nashville)
- Olivia Rodrigo (Inglewood)
- OneRepublic (Inglewood, Rosemont, Detroit, Washington, DC, Philadelphia, Nashville)
- Raye (Fort Worth, Inglewood, Rosemont)
- Sienna Spiro (Inglewood, New York)
- Sombr (New York, Boston, Washington, DC, Philadelphia)
- Stella Lefty (Inglewood, New York, Boston, Nashville)
- Teddy Swims (New York, Nashville)
- The Beaches (Fort Worth, Inglewood, Rosemont, Detroit, New York, Boston, Washington, DC, Philadelphia, Nashville)
- Tove Lo (Fort Worth, Rosemont, Detroit)
- Tomorrow X Together (New York, Boston, Washington, DC)
- Yeonjun (New York, Boston, Washington, DC)

== See also ==
- The Jingle Ball Tour 2014
- iHeartRadio Jingle Ball Tour 2016

https://www.iheart.com/jingle-ball/#lineup
