= Moonlight (Grace VanderWaal song) =

Single by Grace VanderWaal

from the album Just the Beginning
- Released: June 21, 2017
- Genre: Pop; dance
- Length: 2:54
- Label: Syco; Columbia
- Songwriters: Grace VanderWaal; Ido Zmishlany
- Producer: Ido Zmishlany

Grace VanderWaal singles chronology
"I Don't Know My Name" (2016)	"Moonlight" (2017)	"Sick of Being Told" (2017)

Music video
- "Moonlight" on YouTube

"Moonlight" is a song by American singer-songwriter Grace VanderWaal. It was written by VanderWaal and Ido Zmishlany, and produced by the latter. The song was released on June 21, 2017, through Syco Music and Columbia Records, and is the lead single from VanderWaal's debut studio album, Just the Beginning. VanderWaal introduced the song live at VidCon in June 2017, and she released a music video of "Moonlight" on her YouTube Vevo channel the following month. The song received largely positive reviews.

== Background ==
VanderWaal began work on her first studio album, Just the Beginning in early 2017. When she released the first single from the album, "Moonlight", she commented on the song's meaning: "'Moonlight' is about somebody you know very well changing unnaturally over time right in front of you and pushing you away, so you want to help bring them back to their original self."

== Critical reception ==
Gil Kaufman of Billboard described the song as "summery". He opined that the song "displays a fun tropical beat making it the perfect summer song", and that it "digs a little deeper" and "displays maturity". Raisa Bruner of Time regarded the song as "a summery, breathy and upbeat summer song", and wrote that it "maintains [VanderWaal's] acoustic flair while layering in a lightly tropical touch". Jon Caramanica of The New York Times felt that the song "sounds like steroidal bluegrass-inflected space-pop", and VanderWaal's vocal "sounds emotionally exhausted, like a singer twice her age, or more." Gabriella Ginsberg of Hollywood Life called the single "infectious" and "amazing", and felt that it has an "awesome beat". She wrote that VanderWaal's "classic ukelele sound shines through". Cayla Bamberger of J-14 wrote: "The track delivers all that we love about VanderWaal: her raspy vocals, a heavy beat, her signature ukulele, and an acoustic sound. ... The track shows VanderWaal's increasing maturity and sophistication as both a wise teenage girl and a singer-songwriter." Maeve McDermott of USA Today referred the song as "an upbeat, wistful pop song".

== Music video ==
The music video was released on July 21, 2017, and was directed by Blythe Thomas. It is VanderWaal's first official music video. It features VanderWaal wandering along deserted city streets and arriving on a deserted rooftop, intercut with scenes of her singing and playing the ukelele and scenes of an imagined dance party, where she plays the banjo among friends. VanderWaal said of the inspiration for the music video: "The story is about someone going through depression, and seeing the way they're changing, and that fake alter-personality ... a lot of people go through depression and if you know someone who is, please talk to them and try to reach out. It's [also] about walking down memory lane and remembering just last year, feeling magical, like you were dancing in the moonlight." As of March 2022, the video has been viewed over 55 million times on YouTube.

== First live and broadcast performances ==
On June 23, 2017, VanderWaal made her live performance debut of the track at VidCon US 2017. Among other broadcast performances of the song, VanderWaal sang it at the first live results show, in August 2017, of America's Got Talent, season 12.

== Track listing ==
- Digital download
1. Moonlight – 2:54
- Digital download – BKAYE Remix
1. Moonlight (BKAYE Remix) – 3:41

== Credits and personnel ==
- Grace VanderWaal – writing and vocals
- Ido Zmishlany – writing, producing and engineering
- Andrew Pertes – bass
- Dylan Brady – ukulele

Credits adapted from Just the Beginning liner notes.

== Charts ==
Chart (2017)	Peak position
Belgium (Ultratip Bubbling Under Wallonia)	3

== Release history ==
Region	Date	Format	Version	Label	Ref.
Various	June 21, 2017	Digital download	Original	Syco; Columbia	
Various	August 18, 2017	Digital download	BKAYE Remix	Syco; Columbia	
