= Childstar (album) =

2025 studio album by Grace VanderWaal

Studio album by Grace VanderWaal
- Released: April 4, 2025
- Genre: Indie pop
- Label: Pulse Records
- Producer: Eren Cannata; DTK; Jack Riley; John Samuel Gerhart; PomPom; Max Margolis

Grace VanderWaal chronology
Letters Vol. 1 (2019)	Childstar (2025)

Singles from Childstar
- 1. "Call It What You Want" Released: August 16, 2024; 2. "What's Left of Me" Released: September 18, 2024; 3. "Babydoll" Released: February 28, 2025; 4. "Proud" Released: March 21, 2025

Childstar is the second studio album by American singer-songwriter Grace VanderWaal, released on April 4, 2025, by Pulse Records. It is VanderWaal's second full-length album. VanderWaal co-wrote all nine songs on Childstar.

In advance of the album's release, VanderWaal released several singles from the album and promoted it with live and broadcast appearances and a tour to major North American cities in May 2025. She also released a choreographed short film, Childstar: Final Act, on her YouTube channel, featuring five of the songs.

== Production and release ==
Producers on the album include Eren Cannata, who produced five of the nine songs. VanderWaal co-wrote each track. Vanderwaal released the album on April 4, 2025, through Pulse Records.

Along with the album, VanderWaal released on her YouTube channel a choreographed short film, Childstar: Final Act, co-directed by VanderWaal with Luca Renzi and Jacob Boehme, and co-choreographed by VanderWaal and Renzi. The video features performances of five of the songs from Childstar: "Proud", "Brand New", "Homesick", "Behavioral Problems" and "Fade".

== Reception ==
Of the album's second single "What's Left of Me", one reviewer wrote: "Driven by her gripping vocals, it's a raw track". Upon the release of Childstar, Olivia Hogan of Melodic magazine wrote: "I was astonished by the album’s production and lyricism. Grace ... used it as a powerful vehicle to tell her story ... with a wide range of sounds that keep listeners engaged throughout. ... The album is vulnerable, courageous, and authentic." Khushboo Malhotra of CelebMix wrote: "Childstar is a hauntingly poetic excavation of identity, autonomy, and the aching complexity of coming of age under a spotlight you never asked for. ... VanderWaal doesn’t just sing here – she aches, whispers, and claws her way".

Of "Childstar: Final Act", a reviewer for CelebMix wrote: "it’s part performance art, part soul exorcism." A reviewer from Prelude Press called the accompanying film "Heartbreaking, captivating and cathartic all at once, Grace bares her soul, sharing her experiences growing up in the public eye through song, dance and raw emotion in each of these five performances." The album and its accompanying film were a staff pick by The A.V. Club.

== Commercial performance ==
The album has been streamed more than 10 million times on Spotify as of December 2025.

== Tour ==
VanderWaal promoted the album with a U.S. tour in May 2025 with shows in Chicago, Toronto, Washington, DC, New York City, Los Angeles and San Francisco. The concerts included songs from Childstar as well as VanderWaal's previous releases.

== Track listing ==
Childstar
No.	Title	Writer(s)	Producer(s)	Length
1.	"Proud"	Grace VanderWaal; Eren Cannata; Brittany Campbell; Nico Mansikka-Aho	Cannata; DTK	2:32
2.	"Brand New"	VanderWaal; Cannata; Skyler Stonestreet	Cannata	2:51
3.	"Homesick"	VanderWaal; Doug Schadt	Schadt	2:35
4.	"What's Left of Me"	VanderWaal; Tiffany Stringer; John Bookhout Riley	Jack Riley	3:15
5.	"Call It What You Want"	VanderWaal; John Samuel Gerhart	Gerhart	2:35
6.	"Babydoll (feat. Aliyah's Interlude)"	VanderWaal; Max Margolis; Stringer; Kellen Pomeranz; Aliyah Bah	PomPom; Margolis	2:30
7.	"Beg for It"	VanderWaal; Cannata; Stonestreet	Cannata	2:26
8.	"Behavioral Problems"	VanderWaal; Cannata; Stonestreet	Cannata	2:36
9.	"Fade"	VanderWaal; Cannata; Stonestreet	Cannata	3:32
Total length:				24:55

== Personnel ==
- Grace VanderWaal – Vocals
- Aliyah's Interlude – Vocals
- Eren Cannata – Percussion, keyboards, synthesizer, bass guitar, piano, drum, drum programming, electric guitar, background vocals
- Brittany Campbell – Electric guitar
- Nico Mansikka-Aho – Keyboards, drum programming
- Godfrey Furchtgott – Strings
- Doug Schadt – Acoustic guitar
- PomPom – Programming, keyboards, bass guitar, electric guitar, electric bass guitar, background vocals
- Max Margolis – Synthesizer, electric guitar
- Skyler Stonestreet – Background vocals
