= Jingle Ball Tour 2016 =

2016 concert tour

- Tour by Various Artists
- Start date: November 29, 2016
- End date: December 18, 2016
- Legs: 1
- No. of shows: 12 in United States; 12 total

Various Artists concert chronology
- Jingle Ball Tour 2015 (2015); Jingle Ball Tour 2016 (2016); Jingle Ball Tour 2017 (2017)

The iHeartRadio Jingle Ball Tour 2016 is a national holiday tour by iHeartMedia, which began on November 29, 2016 in Dallas at the American Airlines Center. The tour ended on December 18, 2016 in Sunrise, Florida at the BB&T Center. The performance in New York City on December 9 benefited the Robin Hood homeless charity fund. It is the second highest grossing Jingle Ball Tour of all time following the Jingle Ball Tour 2014.

== Performers ==
- Alessia Cara
- Ariana Grande
- Backstreet Boys
- Britney Spears
- Bruno Mars
- Camila Cabello
- Charlie Puth
- Daya
- Diplo
- DNCE
- Ellie Goulding
- Fifth Harmony
- G-Eazy
- Gnash
- Grace VanderWaal
- Hailee Steinfeld
- Justin Bieber
- Lukas Graham
- Machine Gun Kelly
- Martin Garrix
- Meghan Trainor
- Niall Horan
- Nicky Jam
- Nick Jonas
- Pitbull
- Shawn Mendes
- The Chainsmokers
- Tinashe
- Tove Lo
- Sabrina Carpenter

== Shows ==
List of concerts
Date	City	Country	Venue	Station	Attendance	Revenue
North America
November 29, 2016	Dallas	United States	American Airlines Center	106.1 KISS FM	12,573 / 13,720	$841,149
December 1, 2016	San Jose	United States	SAP Center	WiLD 94.9	—	—
December 2, 2016	Los Angeles	United States	Staples Center	102.7 KIIS FM	16,116 / 16,116	$1,675,990
December 5, 2016	Saint Paul	United States	Xcel Energy Center	101.3 KDWB	—	—
December 7, 2016	Philadelphia	United States	Wells Fargo Center	Q102	—	—
December 9, 2016	New York City	United States	Madison Square Garden	Z100	17,609 / 17,609	$2,548,732
December 11, 2016	Boston	United States	TD Garden	Kiss 108	—	—
December 12, 2016	Washington, D.C.	United States	Verizon Center	HOT 99.5	—	—
December 14, 2016	Rosemont	United States	Allstate Arena	103.5 KISS FM	—	—
December 16, 2016	Atlanta	United States	Philips Arena	Power 96.1	13,662 / 13,662	$824,200
December 17, 2016	Tampa	United States	Amalie Arena	93.3 FLZ	—	—
December 18, 2016	Sunrise	United States	BB&T Center	Y100	—	—
Total					59,960 / 61,107 (98.1%)	5,890,071
