= Maniac Magee (film) =

2003 television film

- Based on: Maniac Magee by Jerry Spinelli
- Written by: Michael Nolin; Jack Zurla; Mark Zaslove
- Directed by: Bob Clark
- Starring: Michael Angarano; Orlando Brown; Kyla Pratt; Jada Pinkett Smith; Rolonda Watts
- Theme music composer: Alyssa Brown
- Country of origin: United States
- Original language: English

Production
- Producers: Michael Nolin; Jack Zurla; Mark Zaslove
- Cinematography: Marshall Adams
- Editors: Stan Cole; Kevin Ross
- Running time: 98 minutes
- Production companies: Edmonds Entertainment; Nickelodeon Productions

Original release
- Network: Nickelodeon
- Release: February 23, 2003

Maniac Magee is a television film made for the Nickelodeon network, based on the novel of the same name by Jerry Spinelli. The story follows twelve-year-old Jeffrey Lionel "Maniac" Magee, an orphaned runaway with many extraordinary and athletic talents, who arrives in a town divided with racial conflict. Developed as early as 1999, the film was filmed in 2001 and broadcast on Nickelodeon on February 23, 2003.

The teleplay was a finalist for a Humanitas Prize in the Children's Live Action program category in 2003, though the award was ultimately won by A Ring of Endless Light.

== Plot ==
In the present, Amanda Beale arrives at a public park in Two Mills, Pennsylvania where she goes to watch some kids jumping rope together at a park. She serves as the narrator and goes to tell the story of Maniac Magee who changed the town of Two Mills forever.

Two decades earlier, the parents of twelve-year-old Jeffrey Lionel Magee are killed by a drunk driver. To avoid being put in an orphanage, Jeffrey runs out of town and across the country, developing supernatural-like qualities to run at a very fast speed. After nearly a year of running, he arrives in the town of Two Mills, where racial tensions are extremely strong. Hector Street, the main street located in the middle of the town, divides Two Mills by race: blacks on East End, whites on West End.

Jeffrey is confused by the racial biases and first crosses over on the East End where the black people stare at him. He is amazed by a giant ball of twine located outside of a pizza place called "Cobble's Corner" owned by an elderly black man, Mr. Cobble. Mr. Cobble comes out and tells Jeffrey to go back "to his own side". Jeffrey does so and comes across a kid's baseball game where he comes across a white teenager, Big John McNab, a pitcher known for striking out many kids with his fast throw. His younger brothers, Russell and Piper, cheer him on from behind the gate. Jeffrey skips a line of kids waiting to bat to take on Big John and manages to strike the ball so fast it disintegrates in the air. After being humiliated further, Big John tells his friends to go after Jeffrey proclaiming him as a "maniac". Jeffrey makes a run for it back across the East End urged by the white boys not to come back over.

On the East End, Jeffrey runs by a school and meets with a girl his age named Amanda Beale, who is surprised to see him given his skin color. Realizing she has a suitcase full of books, Jeffrey urges her to let him borrow one and promises to bring it back to her. Jeffrey goes to read the book under a tree and catches the eye of Mars Bar Thompson and his friend Bump Gilliam. Mars goes to pick a fight with Jeffrey and rips a page out of Amanda's book. Amanda comes over and scolds Mars and sends him away. Amanda takes Jeffrey over to her house so he can fix her book where Jeffrey meets her mother Martha who assumes he isn't from the town. When Amanda asks if he can stay for dinner, her mother refuses until her younger children, twins Hester and Lester, beg her otherwise. After dinner, Mr. Beale goes to drive Jeffrey home only to discover along the way he doesn't have one. He takes Jeffrey back and talks to Martha, who persuades him to let Jeffrey stay for a while.

Jeffrey is treated with absolute kindness by the Beales. Martha buys him new clothes. Hester and Lester promote Jeffrey's ability to untie knots to the other children in the neighborhood who come by to see him over by Amanda's tent. Jeffrey has another encounter with Mars Bar during a football game and stuns Mars when eating off of his already-eaten chocolate bar. Back on Hector Street, a man collapses in front of Cobble's Corner. As Jeffrey tries to lift him up, the man and Mr. Cobble scolds him to go back over to his own side. When he and Amanda return home, they find Martha scrubbing off profanity that was written on the house that reads: "FISH BELLY GO HOME" that horrifies Jeffrey. Amanda worries he will leave. To help him gain the community's respect, she suggests he unties Mr. Cobble's huge knot which no one has been able to do. The next day, Mr. Cobble lets Jeffrey perform the task of untying the knot ball which he does successfully and amazes the Easties. The story gets around, angering Mars Bar in which he and his friends trash Amanda's tent and destroy her favorite book. Jeffrey is heartbroken and feels his presence on the East End is making things worse. He leaves a note for the family and decides to run away.

Jeffrey crosses over to the West End and goes to sleep out in the woods near a trail and finds Piper and Russell, who are running away to Mexico. Jeffrey feels the food they packed for themselves won't last them and winds up taking them back home. They cut through the park where Big John is and he scolds his brothers for attempting to run away for what is now the fifth time. To get on Big John's good side, Jeffrey makes up a story about Big John pitching a ball to him and missing the hit. Big John wants Jeffrey to tell his dad that. They go home to see George McNab preparing for war if the East End residents were to try to conquer their side, keeping a stash of many cans of beans and prunes in his house feeling the Easties will try to come over and take them. Feeling uncomfortable, Jeffrey thinks about leaving. After taking Russell and Piper to the zoo and coming home and seeing them and their dad performing a drill to attack the Easties, he decides to head over to the East End.

Jeffrey meets with Amanda, who tried to cross over to the West End but was afraid of standing out. Jeffrey tells her that the McNabs are nice deep down but need her to help him keep Russell and Piper from turning as crazy as their father. They go over to Mars Bar's house for help and declares he is too scared to cross over Hector Street. That night, Jeffrey, Amanda, Mars Bar and his friends all show up surprising all the white guests. Big John and his friends go to face off against Mars Bar and his friends and Mars Bar tells them not to cross over Hector Street. Mr. McNab rages war on them and brings out a cannon. Mars Bar and his friends turn to leave, and Big John calls them chicken. Afterward, an explosion is heard. They all go outside and see that Mars Bar and his friend Bump blew apart the statue head of the town's founder outside of the house. Mr. McNab is stunned and tells Big John and his friends to go after them. Jeffrey and Amanda stay behind to watch.

Meanwhile, Piper and Russell go upstairs and try to fire bean cans at them from a window ledge. Piper slips from the window and falls. Mars Bar runs back and catches him. Russell runs off, knocking over the barrier of stone he and Piper were standing behind which falls towards the boys. Piper makes a run for it and Big John runs up and rescues Mars Bar by pushing him out of the way. Big John thanks him for saving Piper as well as Mr. McNab who gives him a salute. With everyone now getting along, Jeffrey declares that they blow up the rest of the statue. Mr. McNab does this in honor of Mars Bar saving Piper. Afterward, a spark then magically appears on the line of Hector Street separating the West and East Ends and erases it entirely, officially ending the segregation between them. Everyone comes together and celebrates. Jeffrey attempts to leave town, but Amanda declares he's coming back to her house and staying there for good.

The movie circles back to the present with Amanda telling the story to the kids she saw playing jump rope. She has since married Jeffrey and had two kids. One of the kids she tells the story to is their daughter. The final scene shows an older Jeffrey throwing the ball to Jeffrey Jr., and he swings the ball with it smoking in the air, similar to what happened when Big John pitched the ball to Jeffrey several years before.

== Cast ==
- Michael Angarano as Jeffrey Lionel "Maniac" Magee
- Kyla Pratt as Amanda Beale
  - Jada Pinkett Smith as Adult Amanda Beale
- Orlando Brown as Mars Bar Thompson
- Rip Torn as George McNab
- Adam Hendershott as Big John McNab
- Shan Elliot as Bump Gilliam
- Melissa Bickerton as Dottie Freeze
- Brandon de Paul as Russell McNab
- Isaiah Griffin as Piper McNab
- Rolonda Watts as Martha Beale
- Richard Lawson as Mr. Beale
