= Julie Dretzin =

American actress and audiobook reader (b. 1968)

- Born: May 24, 1968 (age 58)
- Education: Hampshire College
- Occupations: Actress, audiobook reader
- Years active: 1993–present
- Spouse: Sam Catlin
- Children: 2
- Mother: Joanna Merlin

Julie Dretzin (born May 24, 1968) is an American actress and audiobook reader. She made her professional acting debut in the 1993 Broadway production The Sisters Rosensweig. Her roles in the television series Breaking Bad (2010) and The Handmaid's Tale (2018–2019) were well-received. Dretzin has narrated multiple books, including for children, in different accents.

== Personal life ==
Julie Dretzin was born on May 24, 1968, to Joanna Merlin and David Dretzin. In a 1992 interview, she said, "I had a theatrical childhood. I was doing Paul Lynde imitations at 4. And my mom was a casting director for Hal Prince for fifteen years". She attended Hampshire College and her final paper was a thesis about "the destruction of the black-Jewish relationship". She originally planned to attend Rutgers University for a master's degree in theater. When she was offered an audition for the Broadway production The Sisters Rosensweig, Dretzin assumed that she would not receive the role, but she received notice of her being chosen while she was shopping for an apartment that was located near her campus.

She is married to the television writer Sam Catlin, who wrote for Breaking Bad. The couple has two children.

== Career ==
=== Stage ===
Dretzin made her professional acting debut in the 1993 Broadway play The Sisters Rosensweig as Tess Goode. The play ran from March 3, 1993 to August 14, 1993. In 1994 she was a cast member of The Family of Mann and played in the off-Broadway revival of Uncommon Women and Others. In 1995 she appeared in a production of A Dybbuk by the Hartford Stage Company.

=== Audiobooks ===
Dretzin has narrated audiobooks, including some for children. These include There's a Girl in My Hammerlock, recorded for Recorded Books in 1999. In 2003, the Young Adult Library Services Association chose Dretzin's 2001 narration of The Beetle and Me: A Love Story by Karen Romano Young as part of the organization's Selected List of Audiobooks for Young Adults. In a 2001 review of the cassette audiobook Three Days by Donna Jo Napoli, the magazine AudioFile said: "Julie Dretzin's narration is low-key and consistently paced, building the suspense to the unexpected twists at the end. Dretzin's vocal characterizations are there but subtle as most of the story is told inside Jackie's head; we hear softness and pain in Claudia's voice, a gruff quality for the old man". An AudioFile review of the audiobook The Adventures of Flash Jackson by William Kowalski stated, "The book keeps the listener alert with its humor, colorful characters, suspense, and, as read by Julie Dretzin, considerable charm. Dretzin wonderfully impersonates our heroine and, without actually fully voicing them, such other characters as her idiot savant neighbor, her timorous mother, and the sweet little old lady neighbor who turns out to be a retired CIA operative". Dretzin was similarly commended for executing Russian accents for both young and old characters in her 2003 reading of The Impossible Journey, and a Maine accent for her 2004 reading of The Canning Season. Dretzin held free readings of a play by her husband titled Sea of Terror, in 2004.

=== Television ===
Dretzin played Barb, Lisa Kimmel’s sister (and Nate Fisher’s sister-in-law) in six episodes of Six Feet Under in 2004-2005. She received positive reviews for her role as Pamela in the crime drama television series Breaking Bad in 2010 and The Handmaid's Tale in 2018–2019. Rebbekah Wiltons of Worldation wrote that "she is kind of a big deal" in reference to Dretzin's role in Breaking Bad. In a review of an episode of The Handmaid's Tale, Allison Shoemaker of The A.V. Club wrote that Dretzin was great in the episode as Eleanor. Dretzin also had roles in the films Ride, Beastly, and Goodbye World.
