= The Sisters Rosensweig =

1992 play by Wendy Wasserstein

- Written by: Wendy Wasserstein
- Characters: Sara Goode; Gorgeous Teitelbaum; Mervyn Kant; Pfeni Duncan; Nicholas Pym; Tess Goode; Tom Valinus; Geoffrey Duncan
- Setting: London, England; August 1991

The Sisters Rosensweig is a play by Wendy Wasserstein. The play focuses on three Jewish-American sisters and their lives. It "broke theatrical ground by concentrating on a non-traditional cast of three middle-aged women." Wasserstein received the William Inge Award for Distinguished Achievement in American Theatre for this play.

== Production history ==
The play first opened in April 1992 at the Seattle Repertory Theatre.

It premiered off-Broadway in a Lincoln Center Theater production at the Mitzi Newhouse Theater on October 22, 1992, and closed on February 28, 1993, after 149 performances. Directed by Daniel J. Sullivan, the cast included Jane Alexander and Madeline Kahn.

It transferred to Broadway at the Ethel Barrymore Theatre on March 18, 1993, and closed on July 16, 1994, after 556 performances. Again directed by Sullivan, the Broadway cast remained the same as off-Broadway, except that Christine Estabrook took the role of "Pfeni" for Frances McDormand. Notable replacements include Linda Lavin as Gorgeous Teitelbaum and Michael Learned as Sara Goode.

Original Broadway Cast

- Sara Goode - Jane Alexander
- Gorgeous Teitelbaum - Madeline Kahn
- Mervyn Kant - Robert Klein
- Pfeni Rosensweig - Christine Estabrook
- Nicholas Pym - John Cunningham
- Tess Goode - Julie Dretzin
- Tom Valiunus - Patrick Fitzgerald
- Geoffrey Duncan - John Vickery

=== London production ===
It premiered at the Greenwich Theatre in 1994, where it was directed by Michael Blakemore and the sisters were played by Janet Suzman, Maureen Lipman, and Lynda Bellingham. The play transferred to the Old Vic in September 1994

=== Digital production ===
Released on May 20, 2021, there was a livestreamed production of the play to benefit the Actors' Fund, the Theater Development Fund's Wendy Wasserstein Project, and the Steppenwolf Theater Company. Directed by Anna D. Shapiro, the company's artistic director, it featured Lisa Edelstein, Kathryn Hahn, and Tracee Chimo Pallero as the three sisters. It also featured Jason Alexander, Kathryn Newton and James Urbaniak.

== Plot ==
Sara, who lives in London, is a representative for a major Hong Kong bank and is about to turn 54. Her sisters, Gorgeous Teitelbaum and Pfeni Rosensweig, arrive to help celebrate the birthday. Gorgeous is Dr. Gorgeous with a radio-advice program; Pfeni is a world traveler. Various friends and boyfriends also arrive for the party. In particular, Mervyn, a friend of Pfeni's boyfriend Geoffrey, falls instantly in love with Sara.

== Concept ==
Wasserstein said that the play is "about being Jewish." She "wanted to write a play that celebrated the possibilities of a middle-aged woman who, unlike her other protagonists, does not end up alone."

== Critical response ==
The New York Times review of the original production wrote that the play is: "...[a] captivating look at three uncommon women and their quest for love, self-definition and fulfillment. But underlying the comedy is an empathetic concern for the characters and for the prospects of women today. At the same time, the play has its imperfections. There are gratuitous remarks and irrelevancies."

== Awards and nominations ==
=== Outer Critics Circle Award ===
- 1992–1993 season – Best Broadway Play (winner)
- 1992–1993 season – Best Actor (Play) - Robert Klein (winner)
- 1992–1993 season – Best Actress (Play) - Madeline Kahn (winner)
- 1992–1993 season – Best Actress (Play) - Jane Alexander (nominee)
- 1992–1993 season – Best Director (Play) (winner)

=== Tony Award ===
- 1993 Best Play (nominee)
- 1993 Best Actress in a Play - Madeline Kahn (winner)
- 1993 Best Actress in a Play - Jane Alexander (nominee)
- 1993 Best Costume Design - Jane Greenwood (nominee)
- 1993 Best Direction of a Play (nominee)

=== Drama Desk Award ===
- 1993 Outstanding New Play (nominee)
- 1993 Outstanding Actress in a Play - Jane Alexander (winner)
- 1993 Outstanding Featured Actor in a Play - Robert Klein (nominee)
- 1993 Outstanding Featured Actress in a Play - Madeline Kahn (winner)
- 1993 Outstanding Director of a Play (nominee)
