= Space Station Seventh Grade =

Novel by Jerry Spinelli

- Cover, 1st PB ed.
- Author: Jerry Spinelli
- Language: English
- Genre: Young adult novel
- Publisher: Little, Brown
- Publication date: October 1982
- Publication place: United States of America
- Media type: Print (Hardback & Paperback)
- Pages: 232
- ISBN: 0-316-80709-5
- OCLC: 8590245
- LC Class: PZ7.S75663 Sp 1982
- Followed by: Jason and Marceline

Space Station Seventh Grade is a young adult novel by Jerry Spinelli, published in 1982; it was his debut novel. It was inspired by an odd event when one of his six children ate some fried chicken that he had been saving for the next day. The novel was intended for adults but became a young adult novel instead.

== Plot summary ==
Seventh-grader Jason Herkimer narrates the events of his year, from school, hair, and pimples, to mothers, little brothers, and a girl. It is a story about being true to yourself, the nostalgic recollection of adolescent years, and accepting change. Jason has a crush on a cheerleader, Debbie. He also has trouble fitting in at school. He goes through a lot of natural teenage problems and shares the experiences.

== Sequel ==
Spinelli wrote about the same characters in Jason and Marceline (1986).

== Characters ==
Jason - The main character, Jason is also the narrator. He is making a space station throughout the novel which will be a self-sustaining environment. He thinks about Pioneer a lot. He collects dinosaurs and loves science. Jason is a 92-pound linebacker on the football team. Throughout the novel, Jason starts adjusting to getting older and maturing.

Richie Bell - Jason's best friend, another seventh-grader. He gets peed on by a ninth-grader while using a school urinal. He and Jason sometimes bag groceries for money.

Peter Kim - One of Jason's friends, Peter is Korean-American. He takes anything said "just right." Peter has a little brother named Kippy.

Calvin Lemaine - Another of Jason's friends, Calvin is African-American. He aspires to become a doctor, and has a collection of bugs and insects in his bedroom.

Dugan - Jason's friend who attends a Catholic school, unlike the rest of the boys who all attend public school. He is unafraid of basically anything, including walking around the dance floor primarily inhabited by intimidating ninth-graders. Jason mentions how Dugan fits in well and "shows up" everywhere.

Debbie Breen - A cheerleader, one of the most popular girls in school, and gorgeous. She was Jason's original crush, but he lost interest in her after finding out that she had romantic feelings for another guy.

Marceline McAllister - A misfit girl at school. She plays the trombone and is kind of tall and gawky. She hits a cow while riding her bike. She knocks Jason over in a snowball fight and shoves snow in his face. Marceline can run the mile faster than Jason, which irks him, however, he beats her in the final mile race at the end of the book. Jason gets suspended for skipping out on Marceline's trombone performance and is forced to apologize to her. Since then, Jason could not stand her and complains every time that he has contact with her. But at the end of the book, she and Jason become sweethearts.

Kippy Kim - Peter's little brother that tagged along with Peter almost everywhere he went. The group thought he was annoying and immature. Kippy dies in a car accident near the end of the book.

Mary - Jason's little sister who often tattles on him. Jason calls her "cootyhead."

Timmy - Jason's little brother who likes to steal his dinosaurs. Jason likes to tease him. Timmy is Jason's half-brother through his stepfather, Ham.

Ham - Jason's stepfather who works at a community college. He acts a lot and is very good at it. Jason steals his lunch of leftover chicken at the beginning of the book.
