= Who Put That Hair in My Toothbrush? =

Novel by Jerry Spinelli

- First edition
- Author: Jerry Spinelli
- Language: English
- Genre: Young adult
- Published: 1984 (Little, Brown)
- Publication place: United States
- Media type: Print (hardback & paperback)
- Pages: 220 pp
- ISBN: 0-316-80687-0
- OCLC: 49190573
- LC Class: PZ7.S75663 Wh 2004

Who Put That Hair in My Toothbrush? is a 1984 young adult novel written by Jerry Spinelli.

== Plot summary ==
The story starts by having chapters between a girl named Megin and her brother Greg, who are in the 7th and 9th grade, respectively. The book follows their various arguments and misadventures while exploring the thorny issue of sibling rivalry, giving both sibling's very own perspective on their disagreements and thoughts. For Greg, the story follows his love life, and how he struggles between the choice of two girls, while Megin's story mainly follows her new relationship with Emile and Zoe, which are two of Megin's new friends.

== Background and release ==
- The characters Megin and Greg are based on Spinelli's real life children Molly and Jeffery.
- Leo Borlock, who would later be the narrator in Stargirl is mentioned in this novel as a person who everyone goes to for advice.
- There are three main book covers for this book.
