= Eggs (novel) =

2007 novel by Jerry Spinelli

- Author: Jerry Spinelli
- Language: English
- Genre: Young adult fiction
- Published: June 2007; Little, Brown and Company
- Publication place: United States
- Media type: Print (hardcover, paperback)
- Pages: 224pp
- ISBN: 0-316-16646-4
- OCLC: 71788820
- LC Class: PZ7.S75663 Egg 2007

Eggs is a young adult novel by Jerry Spinelli that was published in 2007. The story outlines a relationship that develops between two children that seemingly have little in common other than loneliness.

== Plot ==
Nine year old David Limpert's mother, Carolyn, slips on a wet floor without a wet floor sign, falls down the stairs, and dies. David's family, consisting of his grandmother Margaret, his father, and himself, moves from Minnesota to Perkiomen Township, Pennsylvania. He becomes quiet, sensitive, and attached to an idea that if he follows every law and rule (some of which he arbitrarily created) perfectly, then his mother may come back. David's father is a sales manager who only comes home on the weekends, so he is raised by his loving grandmother, who he disrespects and ignores completely. David's grandmother takes him to an Easter Egg hunt, much to his disappointment. While hunting for eggs, he finds a beautiful girl resting underneath the leaves by some trees. When David asks if she's dead, she makes no response. Believing she really is dead, he starts talking about himself. Eventually he leaves, thinking a newspaper will carry the news of her death. However, it turns out the girl is alive - she is a thirteen year old named Primrose Dufee, who defies all rules. She has no father but a fortune-telling mother. In a short time, the two children become great friends. Primrose lives in a 1977 van instead of a home.

She sets off on a journey with David, who seemed to have no choice when she said she would go to Philadelphia. Later, she admits that she wants to see the Waving Man, a man who had been seen on TV, and known for waving at people as they passed. She also confessed that she wanted to ask why he waves. Much to David's shock, the two spend the night alone and away from home, since they couldn't make it back in time. David finds a comic book, Veronica, and reads to Primrose until she goes to sleep. In the morning, they are soon found by a police officer who had been looking for them throughout the night; but not before David sees the sunrise, which he had vowed never to do without his mother, since before she died she had promised him that they would watch it together.

The book ends with David planning his 10th birthday party. He leaves to go to Primrose, and helps her shove her beanbag back into her home. She wants to move back in with her mother, who had been the first to see her back in town when she came out of the police cruiser. David asks Primrose if they are going to try to go back to Philadelphia. Primrose says no because she knows why the Waving Man waves. When asked by David why he waves, she says, "Because they wave back."

== Characters ==
- David Limpert - A lone nine-year-old boy (ten years old by the end of the book) who is described as very grief-stricken and sensitive about his mother's death. David lives with his father and his grandmother, whom he dislikes because she acts like she is his mother. His grandmother constantly encourages David to make some friends, which he eventually does with a girl named Primrose Periwinkle Dufee and Refrigerator John. He is skilled with his yo-yo (Spitfire), loves to watch television, drink mango madness, and have adventures.
- Primrose Periwinkle Dufee - A rebellious thirteen-year-old girl. David describes her as beautiful. She is often embarrassed by her mom, causing her to live in her "room", a broken down van, outside of her real house. She moves back with her mother by the end of the story.
- Margret Limpert - An old, seemingly kind woman who cares for David. She is always trying to help David but he doesn't see it the same way she does. She is very timid and nervous, especially when it comes to driving. They become closer to each other in the last few chapters of the novel.
- Madame Dufee - Primrose's mother. She is a fortune teller who tells everybody she sees "you will live a long and happy life", except for Primrose, who will have a "short and crappy life".
- Refrigerator John - A very intelligent and kind man that befriends Primrose and David, who also fixes used or broken appliances.
- David's father - He only comes home on the weekends. His grandmother says he's "overwhelmed", however, David thinks that his father doesn't have enough time for him. David's father works in Connecticut, so his grandmother takes care of him most of the time.
- Carolyn Sue Limpert - Born in Minnesota, she is David's mother who died from a slip and fall at work after a custodian failed to put a wet floor sign at a puddle near a staircase.

== Reception ==
Kirkus Reviews wrote "With strong characterization of major and minor characters and a light, poetic touch, Spinelli deftly handles themes of friendship, family, loss and resilience in a story that will long linger in the hearts of readers." and found Eggs "Elegant and memorable." while Publishers Weekly saw that "In Spinelli's (Maniac Magee ) latest novel, the Newbery Medalist falls slightly short of the high standard he's set in some of his previous books." Common Sense Media described it "By turns moving, magical, and startlingly original, this story gives readers plenty to chew on."
