= Knots in My Yo-Yo String =

Novel by Jerry Spinelli

- Author: Jerry Spinelli
- Language: English
- Genre: Young adult fiction, memoir
- Published: 1998 Knopf
- Publication place: United States
- Media type: Print (hardcover, paperback)
- Pages: 148
- ISBN: 978-0-679-88791-1
- OCLC: 37426300
- LC Class: PS 3569.P546Z47 1998

Knots in My Yo-Yo String (1998) is an autobiography written by Jerry Spinelli. The book describes the life of Spinelli from the time he was a child to the time he was a senior. Spinelli was born in Norristown, PA and has the fondest memories of his childhood where he was raised.

This work is considered a variation on Spinelli's autobiography. It has been referred to as a "montage of sharply focused memories" and "the evolution of an exceptional author." This book demonstrates Spinelli's gift for being able to speak to his young readers. It has been utilized as part of library summer reading programs.
