= Smiles to Go =

2008 children's novel by Jerry Spinelli

- Author: Jerry Spinelli
- Publisher: HarperCollins/Joanna Cotler
- Publication date: April 29th, 2008
- ISBN: 9780060281335

Smiles to Go is a 2008 children's novel by Jerry Spinelli.

== Synopsis ==
The novel focuses on Will Tuppence, a ninth grader and meticulous planner who loves stargazing and chess. He develops romantic feelings for his friend Mi-Su, who ends up preferring Will's other best friend, BT. Will's younger sister Tabby gets into an accident, and he realizes that by annoying him, she had been expressing her love.

== Publication ==
Smiles to Go was published by the HarperCollins imprint Joanna Cotler on April 29, 2008. It was intended for middle-grade readers. Spinelli promoted the book by visiting Manchester Elementary and Middle School in Manchester, Vermont in May, 2008, and doing a reading at the Philadelphia Book Festival on May 18, 2008. An audiobook read by Conor Donovan was released the same year.

== Reception ==
Smiles to Go received positive reviews from critics, who praised its voice, humor, and characterization, and emotional resonance, though some found the plot or themes heavy-handed.
