= Wringer (novel) =

1996 young adult novel by Jerry Spinelli

- First edition
- Author: Jerry Spinelli
- Language: English
- Genre: Young adult literature
- Publisher: HarperTeen
- Publication date: 1997
- Publication place: United States
- Media type: Print Paperback
- Pages: 228
- ISBN: 0-06-059282-6

Wringer is a young adult novel by Jerry Spinelli, first published in 1997 by HarperTeen. It received the Newbery Honor in 1998.

It tells the story of a boy named Palmer who dreads his tenth birthday, when he is expected to become a "wringer" who strangles wounded pigeons during the town's annual pigeon shoot. Not only does he not want to kill pigeons, he has befriended one. He learns to take a stand for his beliefs.

== Plot ==
A young boy named Palmer LaRue lives in a town called Waymer, which celebrates an annual Pigeon Day by releasing pigeons from crates to be shot in the air. When the book opens, the town's 63rd annual Pigeon Day is intended to raise money for the city's playground. Ten-year-old boys in Waymer can accept the honor of picking up the wounded birds that have not yet died from a gunshot wound and wringing their necks to "put the pigeons out of their misery."

When Palmer turns nine, his peers Beans, Mutto, and Henry, three trouble-making bullies (though Henry appears to be a passive follower), pressure him to join them in anticipation of becoming the best "wringers," boys who wring the necks of pigeons. Palmer's mother does not approve of his friends for this as the main reason, but she cannot force Palmer to find other friends. Palmer finds himself anxious to live up to his father's example, as he was known as one of the best wringers when he was Palmer's age. Though Palmer is actually reluctant to participate in the Pigeon Day wringing, he does not express this out of fear of being ostracized.

When a pigeon comes to Palmer's window, he secretly takes the bird in as a pet and names it Nipper. To Palmer's surprise, his parents both learn of the existence of the pigeon but respect his wishes to keep Nipper a secret. Keeping Nipper also allows Palmer to befriend Dorothy, a girl who was his childhood best friend, and also opposes the pigeon shooting festival because of its cruelty toward the birds. The gang often bullies Dorothy, causing a disruption between Palmer and her before Palmer realizes how much he had hurt her. When the day of the shooting comes, Palmer is anxious because he has allowed Dorothy to release Nipper in hopes that the pigeon will avoid capture.

Dorothy reveals that she released Nipper near the railroad tracks, unaware that people capture the pigeons at that exact location to release them for the shooting. When the pigeons are released, Nipper is wounded. One of Palmer's friends, Beans, happens to be at the shooting, and he brings the pigeon back onto the field to be killed by the sharpshooter. Palmer chooses to carry Nipper off the field in the midst of the gunfire. As Palmer walks through the booing crowd carrying Nipper, he sees a kid nearby reach out to stroke Nipper's wing. The kid asks his father if he can have a pigeon of his own.

== Reception ==
Wringer was praised by critics for its ability to address deep issues for middle schoolers, as did its precursor, Maniac Magee. In a School Library Journal review of Wringer, Tim Rausch cited the novel for "Humor, suspense, a bird with a personality, and a moral dilemma familiar to everyone," characters who are "memorable, convincing, and both endearing and villainous," and a "riveting plot." Suzanne Manczuk, writing in Voice of Youth Advocates, commented that "Spinelli has given us mythic heroes before, but none more human or vulnerable than Palmer." New York Times Book Review critic Benjamin Cheever also had high praise for Wringer, describing the novel as "both less antic and more deeply felt" than Maniac Magee, and adding that Spinelli presents Palmer's moral dilemma "with great care and sensitivity."
