= The Library Card =

Novel by Jerry Spinelli

- First edition
- Author: Jerry Spinelli
- Original title: The Library Card
- Language: English
- Genre: Young Adult Literature
- Publisher: Scholastic inc.
- Publication date: 1997
- Publication place: United States
- English publication date: 1997
- Media type: Paperback
- Pages: 148 pp
- ISBN: 0-590-38633-6

The Library Card is a 1997 young adult novel by Jerry Spinelli. The book is broken into four short stories each following a different main character, but all connected to a library card.

== Plot ==
The book The Library Card is about four kids who each have some problem in life that the library card solves. During the course of the four short stories, the library card changes each of their lives for the better.

The main character of the first section, Mongoose, struggles with peer pressure from his friend Weasel. Weasel influences Mongoose to steal and to skip school. After coming across the library card, Mongoose overcomes this challenge. The second character, Brenda, is addicted to watching television. She can't watch television for a whole week of school for a school project. During this time, she encounters the library card, which shows her the benefits of reading many kinds of different books. The third character, Sonseray, is a child who lives in a car with his uncle, a migrant worker. Life is hard for him without any stable friends, but one day when he discovers the library card and takes out a book, he finds refuge from loneliness. The final character, April Mendez, has just moved for her father's job on a mushroom farm. She boards a "moving library," (book mobile) which becomes subject to an attempted hijacking. The hijacker (Nanette) and April become friends because of their mutual interest in the library card.

== Reception ==
Critical reception for The Library Card was very positive, with Commonsensemedia giving it four stars. Publishers Weekly said that "While the premise (the card) behind the stories may seem contrived, the author uses it effectively to take a close look at how young people deal with hard circumstances." Kirkus Reviews called Spinelli a "shrewd storyteller" and that the "realistic characters are funny and profound at times" and that "the prose occasionally invites readers to linger over a description". Booklist stated that "Spinelli is able to convey the message with humor and tenderness".
