= Jason and Marceline =

1986 novel by Jerry Spinelli

- First edition
- Author: Jerry Spinelli
- Language: English
- Genre: Young Adult Literature
- Publisher: Little, Brown
- Publication date: 1986
- Media type: Paperback
- Pages: 233 pp
- ISBN: 0-316-80662-5
- LC Class: PZ7.S75663 Jas 2004
- Preceded by: Space Station Seventh Grade

Jason and Marceline is a 1986 young adult novel by Jerry Spinelli. It is the sequel to Space Station Seventh Grade.

== Plot summary ==
Jason Herkimer, the main character of Space Station Seventh Grade, is now in ninth grade. His relationship with his friend Marceline McAllister has developed into a real romance. The only trouble is that Jason isn't quite sure what to do with a girlfriend. His friends insist that the main function of a girlfriend is to make out, but Marceline says there's more to life than that.

== Characters ==
Jason Herkimer - The main protagonist and narrator. He is in ninth grade, and in a relationship with Marceline McAllister.

Marceline McAllister - Jason's girlfriend. She wants Jason to be himself, not who his friends want him to be.

The Gang - Jason's group of wild friends who enjoy drinking, smoking, girls, and parties, some things Jason is not too comfortable with.
