= Elmwood Park Zoo =

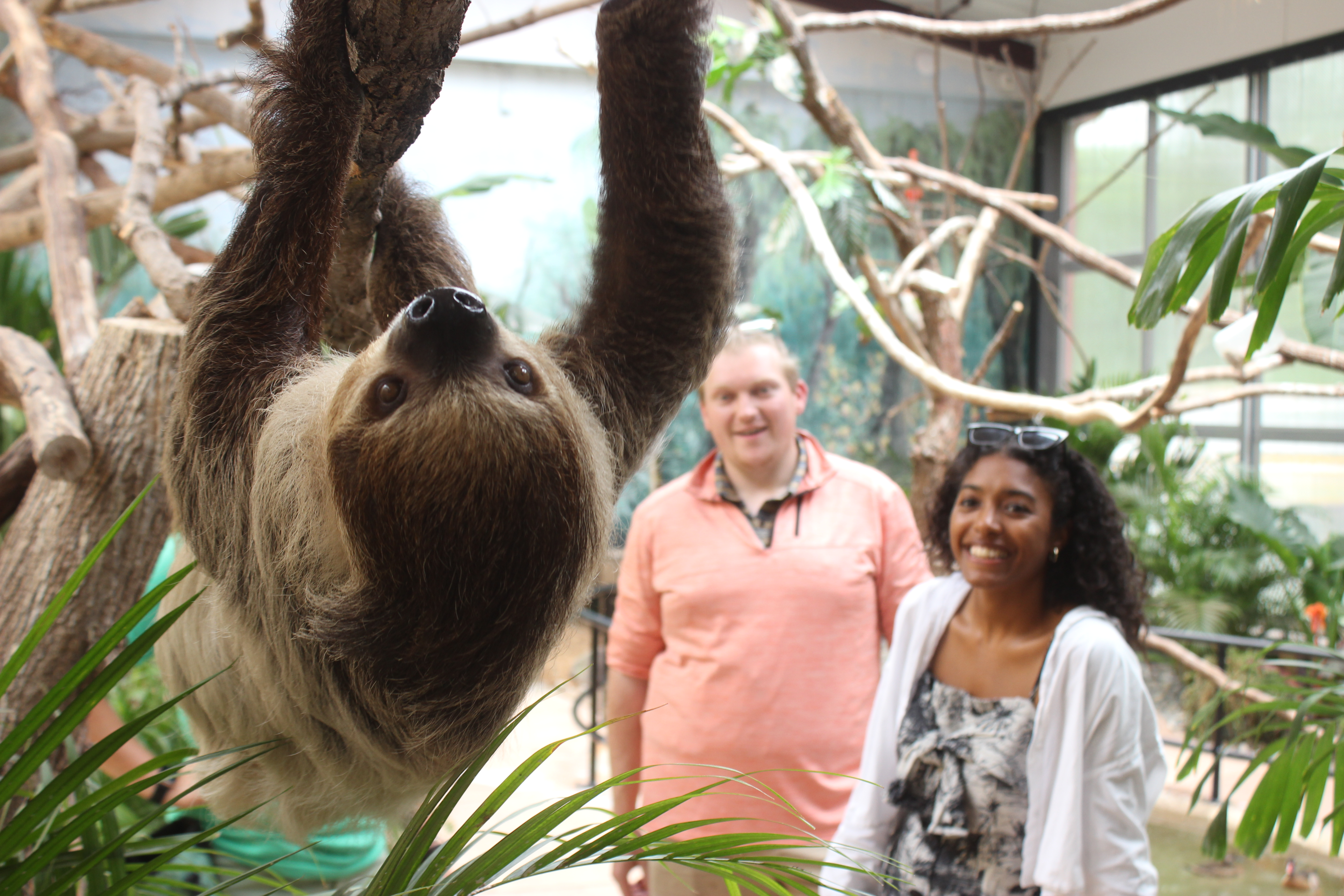
- Guests view a sloth at Elmwood Park Zoo
- Interactive map of Elmwood Park Zoo
- 40.1332°N 75.3375°W
- Date opened: July 4, 1924
- Location: Norristown, Pennsylvania, U.S.
- Land area: 16 acres
- No. of animals: 300
- No. of species: 100
- Annual visitors: 800,000
- Memberships: AZA
- Public transit: SEPTA bus: 90 (at Markley Street)
- Website: www.elmwoodparkzoo.org

Elmwood Park Zoo is a zoo located in Norristown, Pennsylvania.

== History ==
Elmwood Park Zoo officially opened in 1924 after a private land owner donated a small piece of property and a handful of white-tailed deer to the borough of Norristown. The first animals that were exhibited were native to North and South America. The Zoo was supported financially through donations and support by the Norristown Zoological Society. The Norristown Zoological Society established itself as a nonprofit organization and took over ownership of the Zoo from the municipality of Norristown in 1985.

From 1999 through 2002, the Zoo underwent a major expansion that doubled its overall size from 8 to 16 acres. The expansion included a new entrance pavilion and administrative offices, as well as a cafe and gift shop. One of the most popular additions was the Thomas Kimmel Playground that opened in 2001. A year later, the Zoo finished its Oberkircher Discovery Center, a facility dedicated to education programs.

In 2013 the Zoo opened a giraffe exhibit that included daily public feedings. These feedings are still a popular ongoing attraction.

2017 saw the opening of the Zoo's Trail of the Jaguar exhibit. The facility is home to a number of species native to the North American southwest region, including Ocelot, Bobcat, Jaguar, Burrowing Owl, and Gila Monster.

In May 2018, Elmwood Park Zoo became the first zoo in the world to become a Certified Autism Center (CAC). The designation, given by the International Board of Credentialing and Continuing Education Standards (IBCCES), is awarded to organizations who have completed a training and review process with the goal to better serve individuals with autism and other sensory needs.

In the spring of 2021, the Zoo became one of the first in the country to allow guests to visit along with their pet dogs. Guests are permitted to bring their dogs on select days of the week, as well as specific special events.

The Zoo broke ground on a new Welcome Center and Veterinarian Hospital in the winter of 2023. The multi-million dollar Frank and Paige Engro Veterinary Health Center opened in the summer of 2024. It features interactive displays, animal exhibits, and over 3000 sq ft of retail space. The hospital's exam rooms and commissary are viewable by the public.

=== American Association of Zoo Keepers (AAZK) ===
The Elmwood Park Zoo American Association of Zoo Keepers (AAZK) is a non-profit organization made up of zoo professionals.

== Types of animals ==
There are a variety of species living at the Zoo, including amphibians, birds, mammals, reptiles and invertebrates. There are animals on exhibit as well as a collection of "Educational Ambassadors" that appear periodically in onsite presentations and traveling programs. Animals on exhibit include red pandas, bison, zebras, giraffes, jaguars, otters, an American alligator and many more.

The Zoo is home to a North American bald eagle named Noah. Noah was born in July 2001. At 8 weeks old, Noah fell 80 ft. from his nest and suffered head injuries. He spent the first year of his life in recovery at an animal hospital. Deemed unfit to re-enter the wild, Noah was kept in captivity and trained to serve as an Educational Ambassador. Elmwood Park Zoo adopted Noah in 2008. He now appears onsite and in outreach programs that promote wildlife conservation. Noah also appears as the live mascot for the professional football team, the Philadelphia Eagles.

== Threatened animal conservation ==
Elmwood Park Zoo promotes wildlife and resource conservation and participates in animal management programs as a member of the Association of Zoos and Aquariums (AZA). The Species Survival Plan is the official program of the association that Elmwood Park Zoo has adopted to help protect threatened animals. Some of the Zoo's animals that are managed by the Species Survival Plan include the following:

- Panamanian golden frog
- Giraffe
- Jaguar
- White-faced saki
- North American river otter
- Burrowing owl
- Chacoan peccary
- North American porcupine
- Golden lion tamarin

== Land conservation ==
In addition to Elmwood Park Zoo’s active role in animal management conservation, the zoo is also active in projects focused on conserving essential natural environments. Some of the conservation projects the Zoo has supported include the following:

- The Titi Conservation Alliance
- habitat reforestation
- Naranjo River Biological Corridor
- environmental education
- The Red Panda Network
- The American Bird Conservancy
- The CCCI
- The Monterey Bay Aquarium "Seafood Watch".

== In popular culture ==
In the Newbery Medal-winning fiction book Maniac Magee, the titular character lives briefly in the bison pen of Elmwood Park Zoo.

== Gallery ==
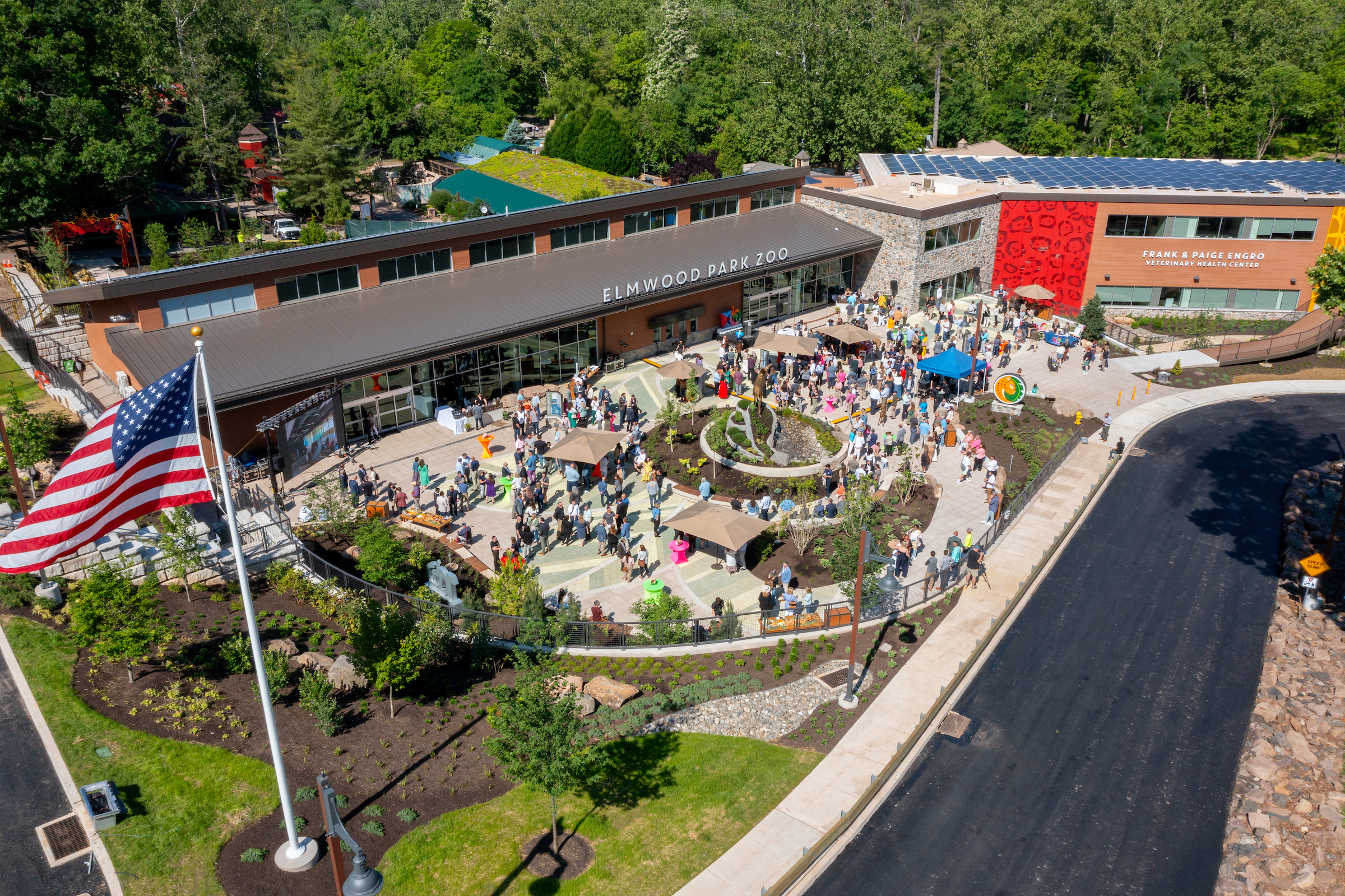
Frank & Paige Engro Veterinary Health Center

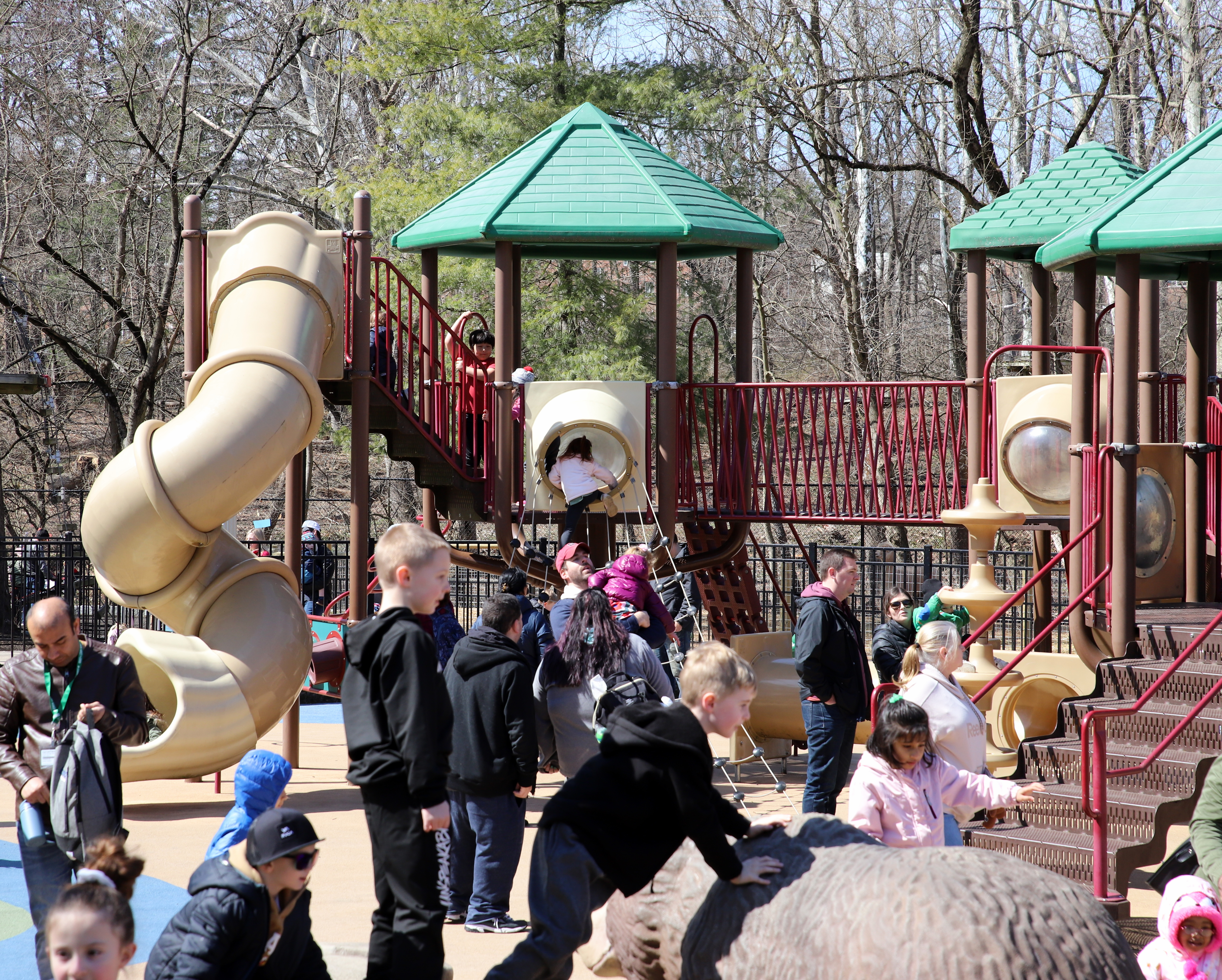
The Thomas Kimmel Playground at Elmwood Park Zoo

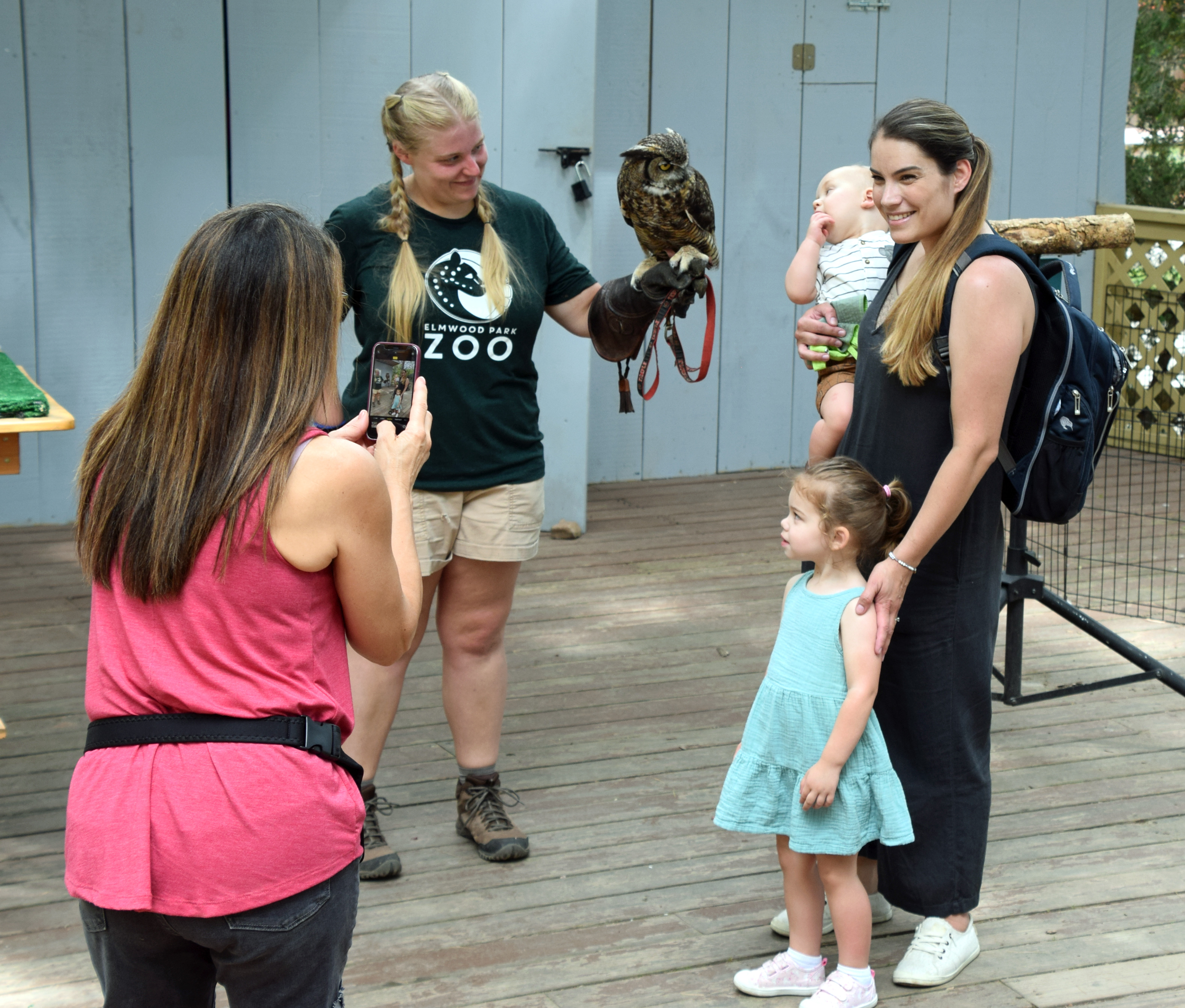
Guests meet an Education Ambassador owl

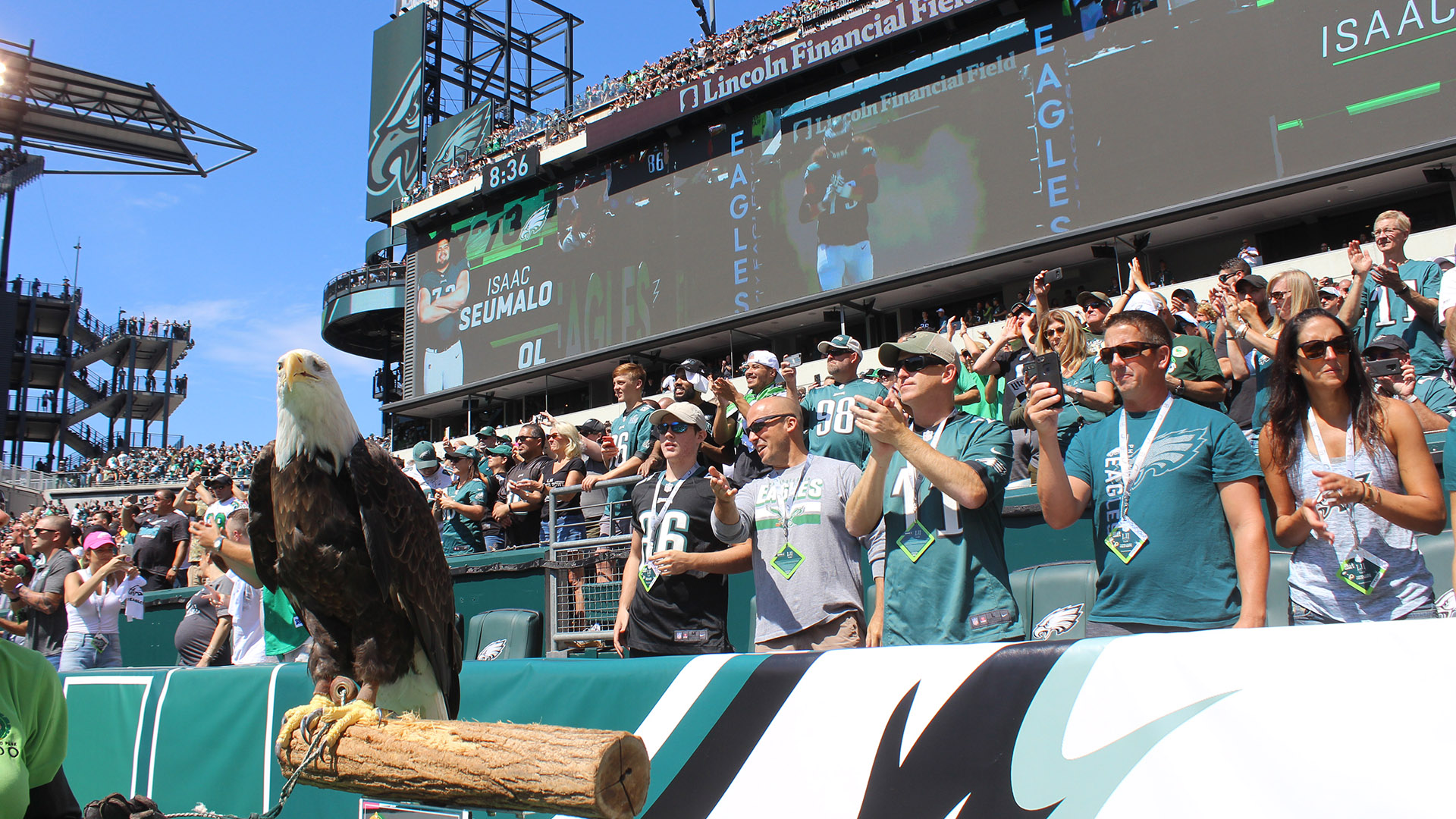
Noah the Bald Eagle at Philadelphia Eagles

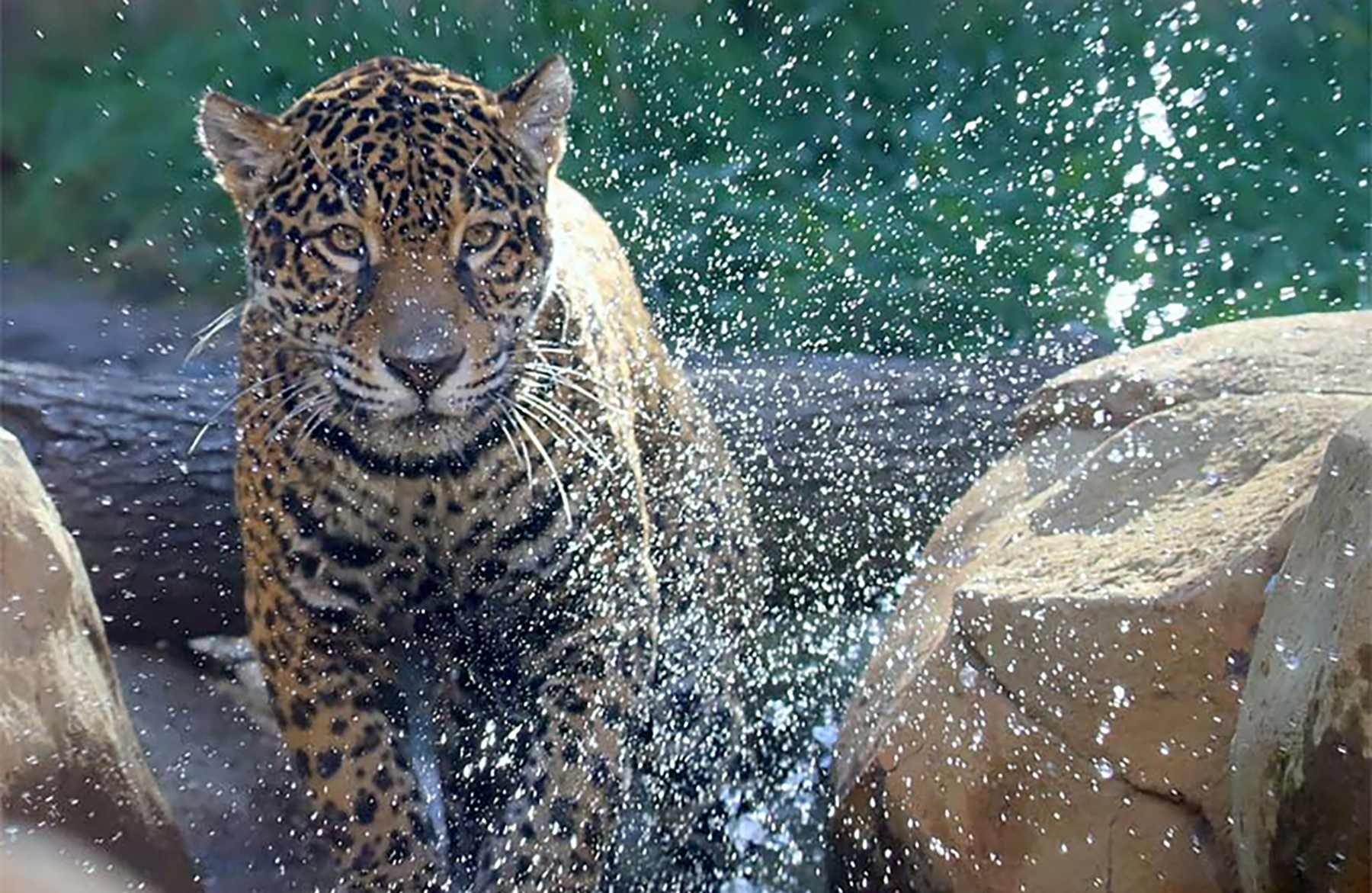
A jaguar splashes in water

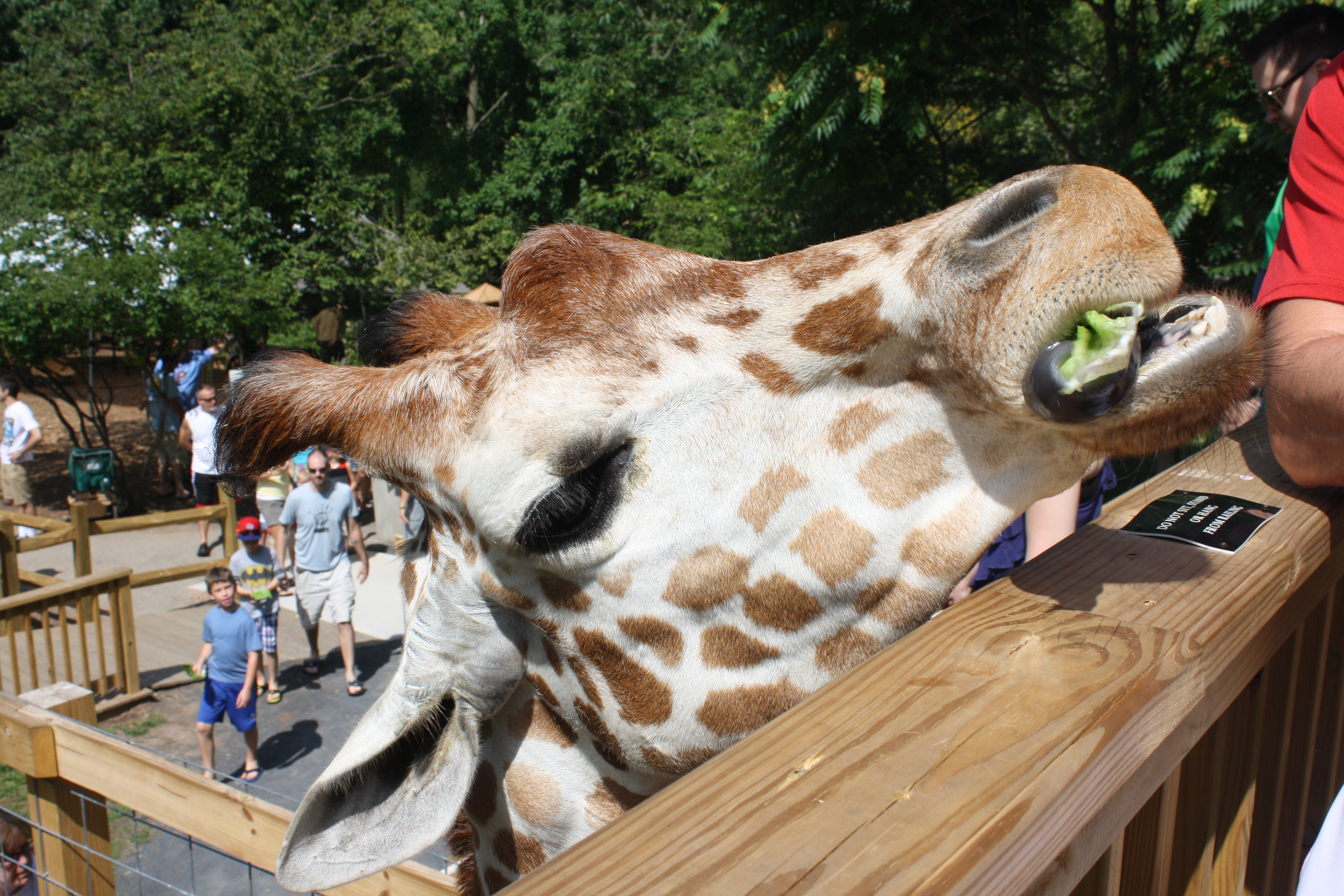
Giraffe feeding
