= Maniac Magee =

1990 novel by Jerry Spinelli

- First edition
- Author: Jerry Spinelli
- Cover artist: Alyssa Morris
- Language: English
- Published: 1990 (Little, Brown)
- Publication place: United States
- Pages: 184pp
- ISBN: 0-316-80722-2
- LC Class: PZ7.S75663 Man 1990

Maniac Magee is a novel written by American author Jerry Spinelli and published in 1990.

Exploring themes of racism and inequality, it follows the story of an orphan boy looking for a home in the fictional town of Two Mills. Two Mills is harshly segregated between the East and West, blacks and whites. He becomes a local legend for feats of athleticism and helpfulness, and his ignorance of sharp racial boundaries in the town.

It is popular in middle school curricula, and has been used in social studies on the premises of reaction to racial identity and reading. A TV movie was released on February 23, 2003.

== Major characters ==
- Jeffrey Lionel "Maniac" Magee is an orphan and finds himself in Two Mills, where he becomes a local legend while trying to find a home. He has astonishing athletic abilities, runs everywhere he goes, can untie any knot, is allergic to pizza, and crosses the barrier between the East End and West End as if blind to racial distinction. He has done many heroic feats such as running for a long period of time, hitting many home runs in a row, entering Finsterwald's backyard, and untying Cobble's Knot. He lived in many temporary homes, even once in a buffalo pen.
- Amanda Beale is the first person Jeffrey meets in Two Mills. She carries her books in a suitcase so they aren't ruined by her younger siblings, Hester and Lester. She defends Jeffrey from Mars Bar and eventually provides him with a home. She is very stubborn. When someone destroys one of her books, Encyclopedia A, she becomes very upset.
- Mars Bar Thompson is the bully in the East End. He dislikes Jeffrey's presence in the East End, which is exacerbated when Jeffrey beats him in a race. However, he eventually rescues Russell McNab from the trolley truss, and offers Jeffrey a place for a while. As his nickname implies, he is known for eating Mars Bars. His real first name is never revealed.
- John McNab is infuriated when he cannot strike out Jeffrey with his ball. After acting as a bully, he welcomes him into his home when he brings back John's younger brothers, Piper and Russell, after their attempt to run away to Mexico. He remains convinced that the black East Enders are planning a rebellion.
- Piper and Russell McNab are John McNab's younger brothers who frequently commit truancy, steal, and constantly try to run away from home. In their house, they use toy machine guns to shoot the "rebels" from the East End. Piper also had a party at the end of the book. They made Mars Bar mad at Jeffrey. Later they play on the trolley tracks and Mars Bar saves Russell. They are eight years old.
- Earl Grayson is the groundskeeper at the zoo and resident of the YMCA, though he was once a minor league baseball pitcher who struck out Willie Mays. He becomes friends with Jeffrey, who listens to his stories and Jeffrey teaches him to read. They end up living together in a makeshift house, which makes him responsible. He is very kind and cares about Jeffrey. Tragically, Grayson's sudden death shortly after Christmas leaves Jeffrey all alone once again.
- Mrs. Beale is the kind and caring mother of Amanda, Hester, and Lester. She is very thoughtful of Jeffrey as well.
- Hester and Lester are the younger siblings of Amanda Beale, and the son and daughter of Mrs. Beale. They are very hyperactive, and will vandalize anything that they can get their hands on.

== Background ==
The town of Two Mills is based on Jerry Spinelli's childhood town of Norristown, Pennsylvania. Spinelli has said that the material from the story was inspired by his childhood experiences there, and a number of geographical correspondences confirm this. Norristown, like Two Mills, is across the Schuylkill River from Bridgeport, and neighboring towns include Conshohocken, Jeffersonville and Worcester, all of which are mentioned in the novel. The Elmwood Park Zoo is in Norristown, and Valley Forge, where Maniac wanders, is nearby as well. There is also a street named Hector Street in Conshohocken.

== Reception ==
=== Critical reviews ===
The book was well-received upon publication, variously lauded in reviews as "always affecting," having "broad appeal," and being full of "pathos and compassion." Booklist reviewer Deborah Abbot says, "...this unusual novel magically weaves timely issues of homelessness, racial prejudice, and illiteracy into a complicated story rich in characters and details...an energetic piece of writing that bursts with creativity, enthusiasm, and hope."

Reviewers noted that the theme of racism was uncommon for "middle readers". Criticism concentrated on Spinelli's choice of framing it as a legend, which Shoemaker calls a "cop-out," seeming like a "chalkboard lesson."

=== Awards and honors ===
Awards and honors for the book include:

- 1990: Boston Globe/Horn Book Award
- 1991: Carolyn Field Award, Newbery Medal (American Library Association)
- 1992: Charlotte Award, Dorothy Canfield Fisher Award, Flicker Tale Award, Indian Paintbrush Book Award, Rhode Island Children's Book Award
- 1993: Buckeye Children's Book Award, Land of Enchantment Award, Mark Twain Award, Massachusetts Children's Book Award, Nevada Young Readers' Award, Pacific Northwest Library Association Young Reader's Choice Award, Rebecca Caudill Young Reader's Book Award, West Virginia Children's Book Award, William Allen White Award

The U.S. National Education Association named Maniac Magee one of "Teachers' Top 100 Books for Children" based on a 2007 online poll. In 2012 it was ranked number 40 among all-time children's novels in a survey published by School Library Journal, a monthly with primarily U.S. audience.

=== Use for educational and research purposes ===
The book is popular in elementary schools as a historical-fiction novel. Many study units and teaching guides are available, including a study guide by the author. It has been used as a tool in scholarly work on childhood education and development. Fondrie cites it as an example in a discussion of how to bring up and discuss issues of race and class among young students. McGinley and Kamberlis use it in a study of how children use reading and writing as "vehicles for personal, social, and political exploration." Along the same lines, Lehr and Thompson examine classroom discussions as a reflection of the teacher's role as cultural mediator and the response of children to moral dilemmas, and Enciso studies expressions of social identity in the responses of children to Maniac Magee.

In a less pedagogical vein, Roberts uses the character of Amanda Beale as an archetypal "female rescuer" in a study of Newbery books, and Sullivan suggests the book as being useful in discussions of reading attitudes and difficulties.

== Adaptations ==
The book was adapted as a TV movie in 2003 which was nominated for the Humanitas prize in the children's live action category, and as an audiobook by Listening Library in 2005. (ISBN 978-0-307-24318-8)
