= Loser (novel) =

2003 novel by Jerry Spinelli

- Book cover of Loser, by Jerry Spinelli.
- Author: Jerry Spinelli
- Language: English
- Genre: Novel, Realistic Fiction
- Publisher: HarperCollins
- Publication date: July 29, 2003
- Publication place: United States
- Media type: Print (hardback & paperback)
- Pages: 218 (first edition hardcover)
- ISBN: 0-06-054074-5
- OCLC: 47996204

Loser is a children’s novel by Jerry Spinelli, first published in 2002 by Joanna Cotler, an imprint of Harper Collins Books. It portrays the growth of Donald Zinkoff, a boy who is considered "stupid" by his classmates due to his clumsiness, poor performance in school and athletics, and sometimes, clueless enthusiasm.

This book is unique among Spinelli's works as it is written entirely in the present tense.

== Plot ==
Loser is the story of Donald Zinkoff, an eccentric and enthusiastic elementary school student. Donald marches to the beat of his own drum, often oblivious to social norms. While his classmates brand him as a "loser," Donald remains positive and finds joy in the simple things.

The story follows Donald through his elementary school years, specifically his time from grade 1 to 5, highlighting his experiences with classmates, teachers, and his supportive family. He faces challenges like being ostracized by his peers, struggling to excel in traditional ways, and dealing with bullies.

Despite the difficulties, Donald maintains his optimistic outlook and embraces life's experiences, both successes and failures. The narrative reaches a turning point in middle school when an unexpected event casts Donald in the role of an unlikely hero.

== Accolades ==
Loser was nominated for the 2004-05 Mark Twain Readers Award.
