= Milkweed (novel) =

2003 novel by Jerry Spinelli

- First edition
- Author: Jerry Spinelli
- Language: English
- Genre: Young Adult Book, Historical Novel
- Publisher: Knopf
- Publication date: 2003
- Publication place: United States
- Media type: Print (Hardback & Paperback
- Pages: 208pp.
- ISBN: 978-03-7581374-0

Milkweed is a 2003 young adult historical fiction novel by American author Jerry Spinelli. The book is about a boy in Warsaw, Poland in the years of World War II during the Holocaust. Over time he is taken in by a Jewish group of orphans and he must avoid the Nazis (or "Jackboots") while living on the streets with other orphans. Despite being a historical fiction novel, Doctor Korczak, a minor character in the story is based on a real person named Janusz Korczak.

Milkweed is the tale of a boy with no identity at a time when one's identity could mean the difference between life and death. Published in 2003, the novel became a popular young adult work used by English teachers to facilitate a discussion of the Holocaust. Readers are immersed in the experiences of a child who does not fully comprehend what is happening around him in the Warsaw Ghetto.

== Summary ==
Milkweed is set in Warsaw, Poland, during World War II. The main character, an unnamed boy who acquires multiple names throughout the plot, is introduced to a band of thieves when he meets Uri, a fellow thief who acts as his guardian, and bestows upon him his new name, Misha Pilsudski. Peter D. Sieruta noted, “Misha’s early days with Uri are almost carefree”. While out stealing with Uri, Misha witnesses German invaders “Jackboots” capture Poland. He describes the Jackboots as “magnificent” and later states that he wants to become a Jackboot. Shortly after Poland is captured, Uri decides to create a false identity for Misha, “which Misha gratefully adopts to fill the void that is his past”. This fabricated background states that Misha is a Gypsy born in Russia to a large and old family. His mother was a talented fortune teller, he had “seven brothers and five sisters,” and a beloved “speckled mare” named Greta. In this story, bombs and hateful Polish farmers separate Misha's family until he winds up as an orphan in Warsaw.

While Misha is smuggling, he ends up in a garden where he meets a girl named Janina. Misha describes Janina as a “little girl,” who reveals she is Jewish. Janina invites Misha to her seventh birthday party and without knowing what birthday cakes are, Misha panics—thinking that they were trying to “burn down the cake”—and blows out the candles and runs away with the birthday cake. With Jackboot control over Warsaw tightening, a curfew is established and “stupid” Misha ends up getting his earlobe shot off from being out past curfew. "As food supplies dwindled, living conditions in the city worsened. Many people, including Janina and her family, lost their homes, electricity was cut off, and Jews faced severe persecution. Eventually, all Jewish residents of Warsaw, including Misha, Janina, and the group of boys, were forced into the ghetto. Janina's uncle Shepsel described their new living conditions as being like living in a 'closet'.".

News goes out that Himmler, a prominent Nazi, is coming. One day, a parade of Jackboots passes, and Misha tries to catch the attention of the ugly, unresponsive man who he thinks is Himmler, but instead is knocked to the ground by Buffo, a man who enjoys killing Jewish children. Once Uri reassures Misha that the man he saw was in fact Himmler, Misha decides that he no longer wants to be a Jackboot. Each night Misha steals by slipping through a hole in the wall that is “two bricks wide”. His friend Janina wants to mimic him, so she begins following him on his stealing expeditions. One day, as they're playing in the courtyard, they spot a milkweed. Janina deems it to be her angel as it flies off into the sky along with other milkweeds. "It was thrilling just to see a plant, a spot of green in the ghetto desert."

As time passes, the conditions of the ghetto worsen. One day as Misha is “walking along,” Uri appears. Uri, who has been gone for a long time, warns Misha that deportations are coming, and that all of the people will be cleared out of the ghetto. Sometime later, an old man appears advising the people that there is no resettlement, and instead the Jews are going to be taken away and killed. That night, Janina's father Mr. Milgrom tells Misha that when he and Janina go out to steal, they need to run away. Janina and Misha stay in Poland though because Janina refuses to leave and kicks Misha when he tries to take her away. Janina drags Misha to the Ghetto only to find the room where they had lived deserted. Janina runs in desperation to find her father, and Misha loses sight of her in the crowd of people. Following, he sees her thrown into a boxcar by a Jackboot. Misha is hit with a club, and kicked before Uri, who appears to be a Jackboot, shoots him in the ear, taking the rest of it off.

Misha awakens near the train tracks in a state of confusion. A farmer finds him and takes him to a farm where Misha stays for three years working and sleeping in a barn with the animals and eventually runs away. Not knowing what to do next, he rides on trains and ends up back in Warsaw where there is rubble and he then removes his armband leaving it on the sidewalk. Misha returns to the countryside, continuously stealing and even drags his own little cart filled with the things he stole. He continues his thievery and starts selling his stolen goods. For Misha, it was "more about talking than about selling". He could not be shut up.

Misha decides to immigrate to America. Misha gets his name changed to Jack by an immigration officer when moving to America. He becomes a salesman here, albeit being quite unsuccessful. "No one hired [him] to sell the best products. The problems were [his] size ([he] had stopped growing at five feet, one inch), [his] accent, and [his] missing ear which now looked like a clump of cauliflower. Who would let such a galoot in the door?" In his desperation to sell the products, he starts to spout "nonsense" about the war. Most people try to ignore him, except for a woman named Vivian who stops to listen to his stories. She marries him but she gets tired of Jack's (Misha's) strange and weird acts so she decided to leave after five months while being pregnant.

Jack addresses the reader, telling them that they were "the thing that gave [him] shape". He tells them that "the important thing was not that you listened, but that I talked. I can see that now. I was born into craziness. When the whole world turned crazy, I was ready for it. That's how I survived. And when the craziness was over, where did that leave me? On the street corner, that's where, running my mouth, spilling myself. And I needed you there. You were the bottle I poured myself into." He continues to ramble about his adventures in the streets. "Then one day in Philadelphia, in the shadow of City Hall two women stopped and listened... After a while one of them reached out her hand and cupped [his] ear clump. She smiled, nodded and said, 'We hear you. It's enough. It's over.' And they walked on, and [he] went another way, and [he] never took another street corner."

Many years pass, and we find Jack working in a Bag ‘n Go market when his daughter and granddaughter walk in. They introduce themselves as Katherine and Wendy, respectively. Katherine asks him to give Wendy her middle name, which she had left blank for him to fill. Without a moment of hesitation, he answers, "Janina". They take him home.

Jack digs up the milkweed plant and plants it in his own back yard. "The milkweed does not change colors. The milkweed is as green in October as in July." He calls it an "angel plant". For him, it is a symbol of endurance; it is a symbol of his survival. He often spends time with his granddaughter, Wendy Janina, who calls him Poppynoodle. Katherine asks him if he'll ever explain to her his granddaughter's middle name, to which he replies, "Someday". As he rocks Janina in his lap, Misha thinks of all the names he has been called. "Call me thief. Call me stupid. Call me Gypsy. Call me Jew. Call me one-eared Jack. I don't care. Empty-handed victims once told me who I was. Then Uri told me. Then an armband. Then an immigration officer. And now this little girl in my lap, this little girl whose call silences the trampling Jackboots. Her voice will be the last. I was. Now I am. I am... Poppynoodle."

== Characters ==
Misha - Main Character “a little child of indeterminate age and background” is a small, short orphan boy who survives by using his size and quickness to steal food and escape danger. Through most of the novel Misha has no recollection of a past and “much less an understanding"

Uri is “scrappy, slightly older boy, with bright red hair” who acts as a ringleader for Misha and the other smugglers. Described as ”fearless on the streets,” Uri often helps Misha escape danger. Unlike Misha and the other orphans, Uri does not live in the ghetto but is found at the Blue Camel, the place where Jackboots live.

Kuba is a boy who Misha calls “the clown.” Has a big obsession with cats.

Ferdi is an orphan boy who Misha calls the “smoke-blowing Ferdi.” When asked questions “[his] answers [are] never long . . . he [blows] more smoke than words.”

Olek is a boy who has one arm. He says a train ran over his arm. He was hanged for stealing food.

Big Henryk is a large boy who will “say yes to everything.” He doesn't wear shoes but instead wears “gray bank coin bags on his feet.” He appears mentally disabled from the "bellowing" and how he says "yes to everything"

Jon is a boy who doesn't speak. Misha sees him as “gray.” He was thrown into the cart of dead bodies and taken away.

Mr. Milgrom is Janina's father. He is a pharmacist who makes medicine, but he stops working a formal job after restrictions are put on Jews.

Mrs. Milgrom is Janina's mother who is sick. She always is laying on a mattress in the Ghetto.

Janina Milgrom is a small young girl who gets frustrated, upset, mad, and pushy frequently throughout the novel. She is “[a] fiery young friend” of Misha and frequently mimics him. She later becomes Misha's sister. Misha later gives his granddaughter the middle name Janina in memory of his sister.

Uncle Shepsel is Janina's Uncle who decides that he will convert to Lutheranism so he will no longer be treated as a Jew. He is described by Misha as "looking like Himmler."

Doctor Korczak, The man who took care of orphans who also had a goatee. He is based on a real doctor, named Doctor Korczak who really did take care of orphans.

Vivian is a “normal, sensible person” who enjoys Misha's mad sounding talk of his past. Later she marries Misha and lives with him for five months before she leaves, pregnant with his child.

Katherine is a friendly “young woman . . . [with] dark brown hair” who is Misha's daughter. She is twenty-five years old with a daughter of her own named Wendy. Misha “wasn’t sure” about Katherine when Vivian walked out, until she finds him years later.

Wendy is four years old and is Misha's granddaughter. She calls Misha “Poppynoodle.”

Herr Himmler is a head Jackboot who has “half a little black mustache . . . [and] a scrawny neck . . . [and] looks like a chicken...“.

Buffo is a flop working in the Ghetto. He is seen by Misha as the "worst flop" who "couldn't possibly be a Jew." His favorite way of killing people (He likes killing Children) is to kiss his club, then throw it away and smother his victims in his stomach. He always smelled like mint, so when someone was killed by him, they say that he "smelled the mint". Misha found him after the war was over, but Buffo just shuffled away.

== Background ==
Milkweed was influenced by Jerry Spinelli's "obsession to understand" the Holocaust growing up and personal accounts Spinelli read before publishing the novel. In an interview Jerry Spinelli said he feels one of his earliest memories are of looking at pictures of the Holocaust. Milkweed pods, a major theme in the novel, seem to have also come from Spinelli's childhood where he used to blow milkweed pods near his home. In his interview with Nadine Epstein, Spinelli explains his hesitance to write a novel based on the Holocaust and on feeling "unqualified" since he had no personal connections with the Holocaust other than caring about it. Once he decided to proceed in writing a novel concentrated on the Holocaust, personal accounts like Elie Wiesel's memoirs gave Spinelli insight.

== Publication history ==
Orchard Books acquired the United Kingdom publishing rights for Milkweed. They previously had sales of 15,000 for Jerry Spinelli's Stargirl.

== Awards and nominations ==
Milkweed received the 2004 Golden Kite Award for Fiction and the 2003 Carolyn W. Field Award for Fiction.

== Symbolism and major themes ==
Examples of symbolism in Milkweed are angels and milkweed pods. In The Horn Book Magazine Peter D. noted that “[the] angel statue and [the] milkweed plant that somehow grows in the ghetto,” were a few of the novel's motifs. Likewise, Suzanne Manczuk explained “Two things come to symbolize hope . . . statues of angels . . . and the unlovely but enduring milkweed pods.”

Milkweed addresses the themes of survival, caring for others, and existence itself. Anna Rich wrote “Misha . . . survives the Warsaw ghetto, where hangings, beatings, and murders are daily occurrences”. In The Houston Chronicle Marvin Hoffman described how “Misha contributes a portion of the meager booty from his forays under the wall to the ‘outside’-sometimes no more than a single potato-to Dr. K's [Korczak's] children.” This is an example of Misha caring for others. In The Bookseller, Wendy Cooling said the novel was “about people, about caring and about life itself”.

== See also ==
- Janusz Korczak
- Once (Morris Gleitzman novel)
