= There's a Girl in My Hammerlock =

1991 book by Jerry Spinelli

- Author: Jerry Spinelli
- Language: English
- Genre: Young Adult Literature
- Publisher: Simon & Schuster
- Publication date: 1991
- Media type: Paperback
- Pages: 199 pp
- ISBN: 0-671-74684-7
- OCLC: 23176942
- LC Class: PZ7.S75663 Th 1991

There's a Girl in My Hammerlock is a 1991 young adult novel by Jerry Spinelli.

== Plot ==
Maisie Potter tries out for the wrestling team in her junior high to get close to a boy she likes, but she soon finds out that what she really loves is the sport of wrestling.

Maisie initially wants to be on the cheerleading squad, but she did not make the cut during tryouts. She is infatuated with a boy at her school, Eric Delong, and will do anything to be near him. Because he tries out for the wrestling team, Maisie decides to try out too. She makes the team but discovers that wrestling is a lot harder than she initially thought. She wins some of her matches but most of her opponents forfeit because they don't think it's right for a girl to wrestle a boy. She has to decide if she should do things that other people want her to do or things that she truly wants to do and is good at.
