= Jerry Spinelli =

American children's writer (born 1941)

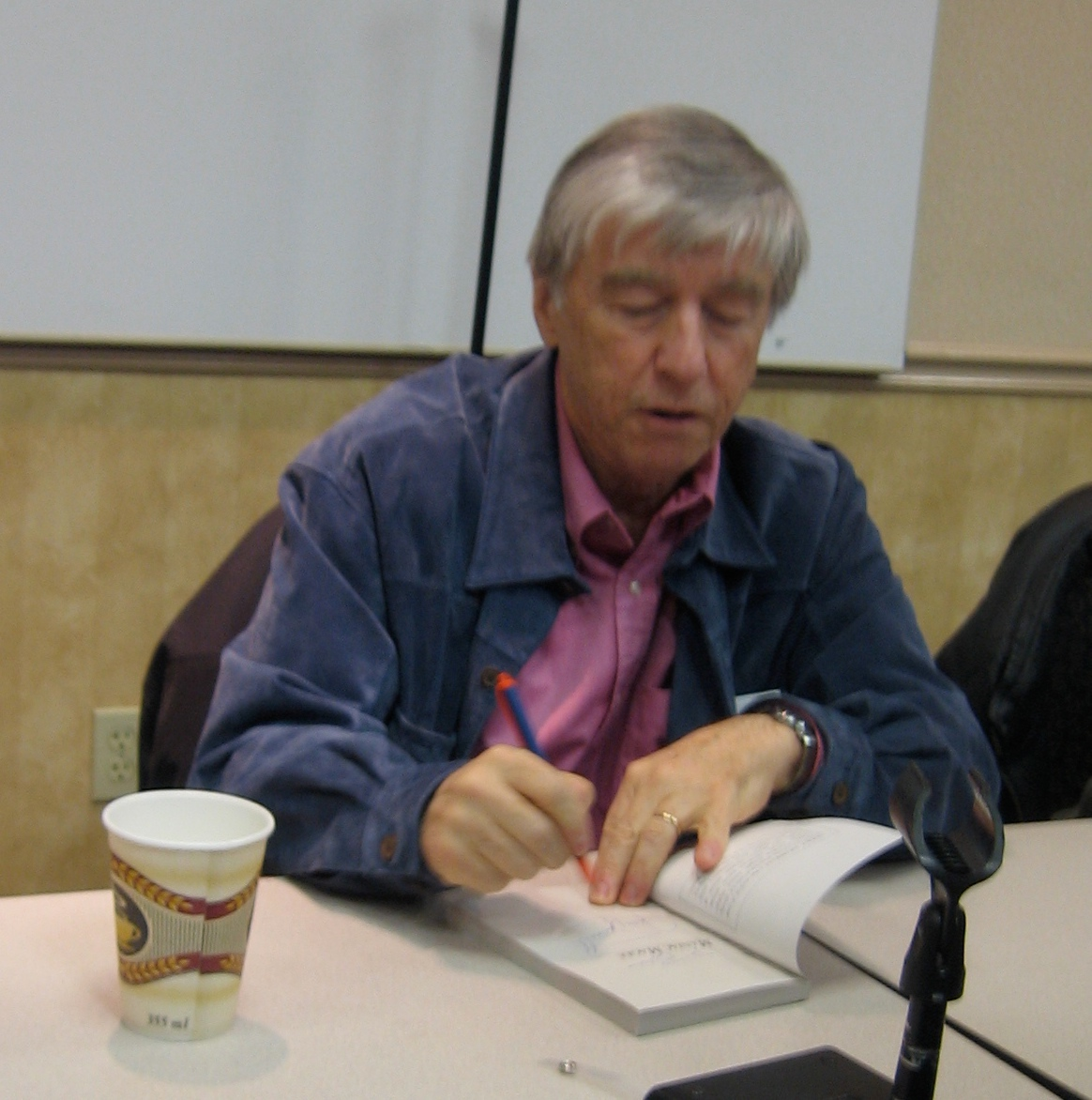
- Spinelli in 2008
- Born: February 1, 1941 (age 85); Norristown, Pennsylvania, U.S.
- Occupation: Writer
- Writing career
- Genres: Children's and young-adult novels
- Notable works: Space Station Seventh Grade; Who Put That Hair in My Toothbrush?; Maniac Magee; Wringer; Stargirl; Eggs
- Notable awards: Newbery Medal; 1991
- Website: jerryspinelliauthor.com

Signature
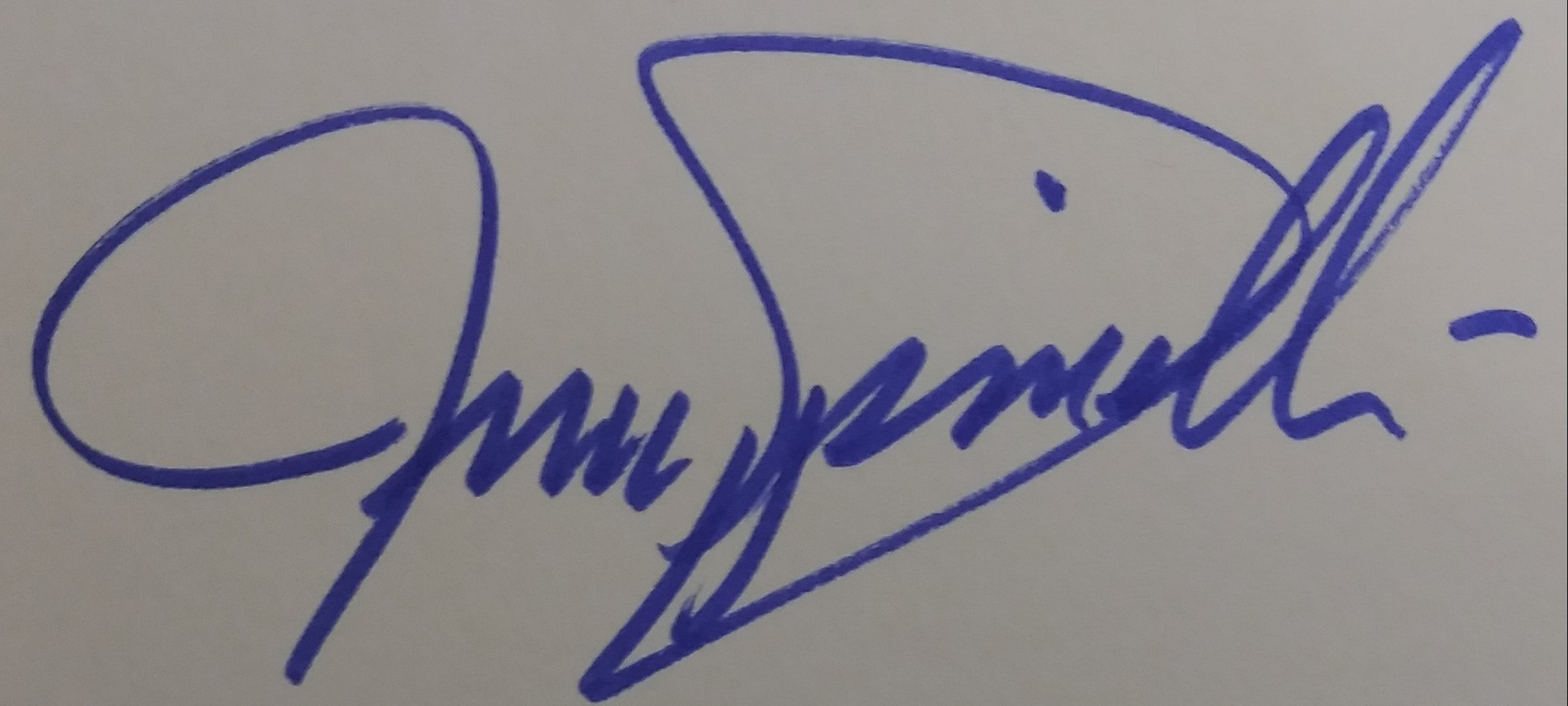

Jerry Spinelli (born February 1, 1941) is an American writer of children's novels that feature adolescence and early adulthood. His novels include Maniac Magee, Stargirl, and Wringer.

== Biography ==
Spinelli was born in Norristown, Pennsylvania, and currently lives in Phoenixville, Pennsylvania. At the age of 16, his love of sports inspired him to compose a poem about a recent football victory, which his father published in the local newspaper without his knowledge. It was at this time he realized that he would not become a major league baseball player, so he decided to become a writer.

At Gettysburg College, Spinelli spent his time writing short stories and was the editor of the college literary magazine, The Mercury. After graduation, he became a writer and editor for a department store magazine. The next two decades, he spent his time working "normal jobs" during the day so that he had the energy to write fiction in his free time. He found himself writing during lunch breaks, on weekends, and after dinner.

His first few novels were written for adults and were all rejected. His fifth novel was also intended for adults but became his first children's book. This work, Space Station Seventh Grade, was published in 1982.

Spinelli graduated from Gettysburg College in 1963 and acquired his MA from Johns Hopkins University in 1964. In 1977, he married Eileen Mesi, another children's writer. Since about 1980, as Eileen Spinelli, she has collaborated with illustrators to create dozens of picture books. They have six children and 21 grandchildren.

== Works ==
Title	Year	Ref.
Space Station Seventh Grade	1982	
Who Put That Hair in My Toothbrush?	1984	
Night of the Whale	1985	
Jason and Marceline	1986	
Dump Days	1988	
Maniac Magee	1990 – Newbery Award	
The Bathwater Gang	1990	
Hallie Jefferys Life	1991	
Fourth Grade Rats	1991	
Report to the Principal’s Office	1991	
There's a Girl in My Hammerlock	1991	
Do the Funky Pickle	1992	
Who Ran My Underwear Up the Flagpole?	1992	
The Bathwater Gang Gets Down to Business	1992	
Picklemania	1993	
Tooter Pepperday	1995	
Crash	1996	
The Library Card	1997	
Wringer	1997 – Newbery honor book	
Blue Ribbon Blues: A Tooter Tale	1998	
Knots in My Yo-Yo String: The Autobiography of a Kid	1998	
Stargirl	2000	
Loser	2002	
Milkweed: A Novel	2003	
My Daddy and Me	2003	
Love, Stargirl	2007	
Eggs	2007	
Smiles to Go	2008	
I Can Be Anything	2010	
Jake and Lily	2012	
Third Grade Angels	2012	
Hokey Pokey	2013	
Mama Seeton's Whistle	2015	
The Warden's Daughter	2017	
My Fourth of July	2019	
Dead Wednesday	2021	

== In culture ==
George Plimpton related an anecdote about Spinelli having bought at auction an evening with the Plimptons, in New York City, during which George Plimpton introduced Spinelli to writers and editors dining at Elaine's, and two months after which Spinelli wrote Plimpton to announce the publication of Spinelli's first book (a children's book) by Houghton Mifflin.
