= Morgan Saylor =

American actress

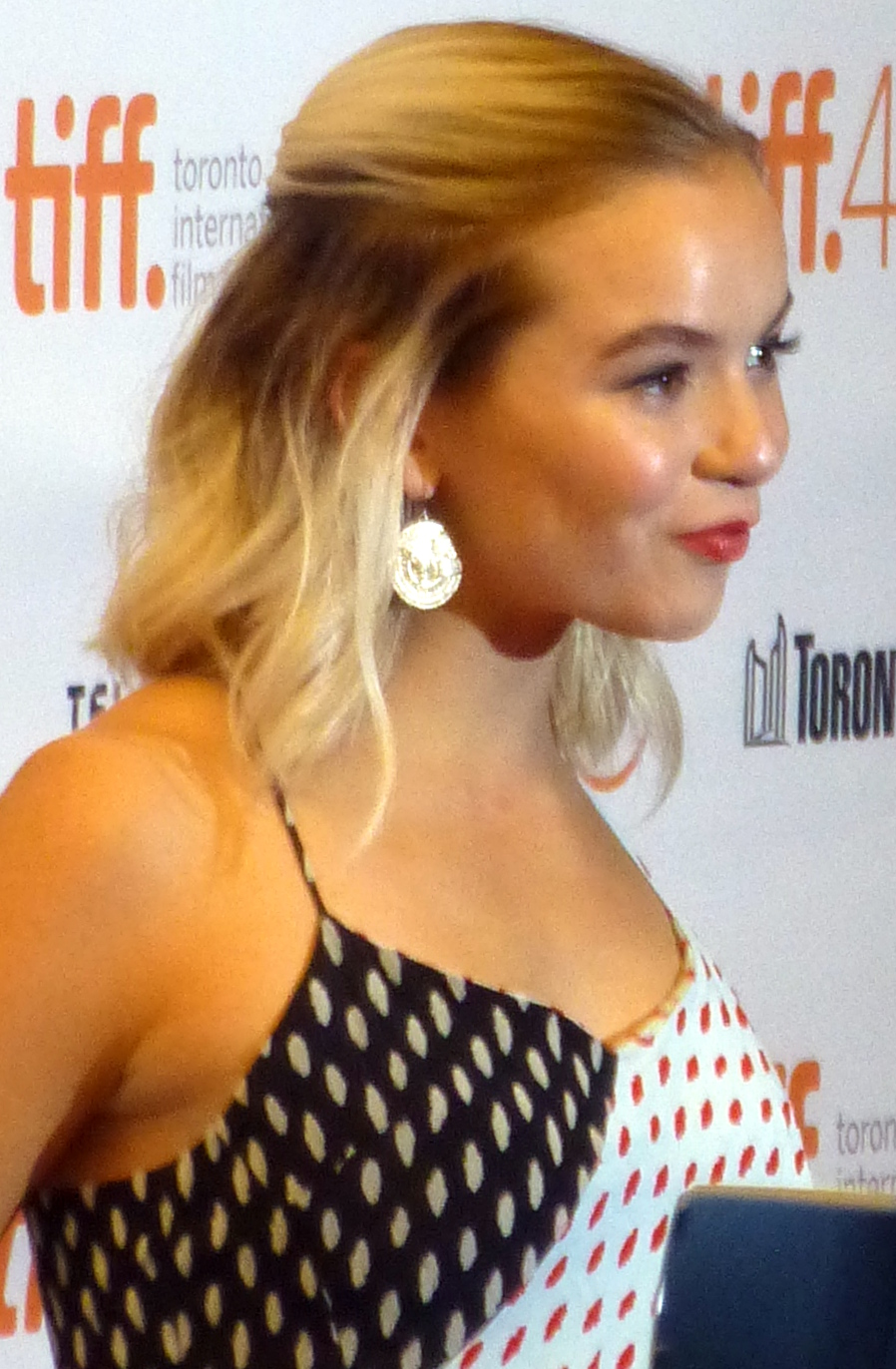
- Saylor at the 2015 Toronto International Film Festival
- Born: 1994 (age 31–32); Chicago, Illinois, U.S.
- Education: University of Chicago; Columbia University
- Occupation: Actress
- Years active: 2006–present

Morgan Frances Saylor (born 1994) is an American actress. She is best known for starring as Dana Brody in the Showtime series Homeland (2011–2013). She has also starred in several feature films, including her critically acclaimed portrayal of Leah in the 2016 Sundance film White Girl. Other films include Rob Reiner's Being Charlie (2015), Novitiate (2017), and Blow the Man Down (2019).

Along with the rest of the cast of Homeland, Saylor was nominated for the Screen Actors Guild Award for Outstanding Performance by an Ensemble in a Drama Series in 2013 and 2014.

== Early life and education ==
Morgan Frances Saylor was born in 1994 in Chicago, Illinois. As of 2013, her mother was an employee at REI and her father doing renovations for Starbucks; they are divorced. Saylor moved to Villa Rica, Georgia, at age two, and Decatur, Georgia, at age ten.

As a teenager, Saylor was part of a competitive rock climbing team and was nationally ranked. She graduated from Decatur High School in May 2013 and subsequently moved to New York City to continue acting. She attended the University of Chicago for a few years between roles, before transferring to Columbia University School of General Studies, graduating in 2024 with a Bachelor of Arts in creative writing.

== Career ==
Saylor began acting through summer camps and community theater as a child. In fourth grade, she visited Los Angeles for the summer where she booked her first professional job: a voice-over as young Meadow in HBO's hit television series The Sopranos. Saylor played Annie in Cirque du Freak: The Vampire's Assistant in 2009 and young Claire in Father of Invention in 2010.

From 2011 to 2013, Saylor played Dana Brody in the Showtime political thriller television series Homeland. The show garnered nearly universal acclaim, especially for its first two seasons. While Dana has sometimes been labelled one of the worst characters ever written, Saylor's performance on the show was frequently praised.

In June 2014, Saylor made her stage debut at the Manhattan Theatre Club as Penny opposite Cherry Jones and Zoe Kazan in When We Were Young and Unafraid, written by Sarah Treem and directed by Pam MacKinnon. Also in 2014, she played Gracie Highsmith in Jamie Marks Is Dead, an adaptation of Christopher Barzak's 2007 novel One for Sorrow, directed by Carter Smith.

Saylor played Kevin Costner's character's daughter Julie in the sports drama McFarland, USA, which was released on February 20, 2015. She played the role of Leah in White Girl, for which she received great critical praise. The film was written and directed by Elizabeth Wood and premiered at the 2016 Sundance Film Festival.

Saylor starred alongside Nick Robinson and Common in the film Being Charlie, a semi-autobiographical feature about director Rob Reiner's relationship with his son. The film premiered at the 2015 Toronto International Film Festival in September of that year.

In 2017, Saylor was back at Sundance to premiere the film Novitiate, in which she plays a young nun opposite Melissa Leo, Margaret Qualley and Diana Agron. Later that year she starred in "Anywhere With You" (formerly titled "We The Coyotes") directed by Hanna Ladoul and Marco La Via. The film premiered the following year in the ACID section of 2018 Cannes Film Festival.

Saylor's next starring role came in Blow the Man Down, which premiered in 2019 at Tribeca Film Festival and was released by Amazon Studios on March 20, 2020. This film was shot on location in Harpswell, Maine.

Morgan starred opposite Ben Rosenfield in the independent film You Mean Everything to Me, written and directed by Bryan Wizemann, released in cinemas in the US December 2021.

== Personal life ==
Saylor lives in Bedford-Stuyvesant.

== Filmography ==
=== Film ===
Year	Title	Role	Notes
2009	Cirque du Freak: The Vampire's Assistant	Annie	
2010	Father of Invention	Young Claire	
2011	The Greening of Whitney Brown	Annie	
2014	Jamie Marks Is Dead	Gracie Highsmith	
2015	McFarland, USA	Julie White	
2015	Being Charlie	Eva	
2016	White Girl	Leah	
2017	Novitiate	Sister Evelyn	
2018	We the Coyotes	Amanda	
2019	Blow the Man Down	Mary Beth Connolly	
2021	You Mean Everything to Me	Cassandra	
2022	Spoonful of Sugar	Millicent	
2024	Au fil des saisons	Charlie	

=== Television ===
Year	Title	Role	Notes
2006	The Sopranos	Young Meadow	2 episodes ("Join the Club" and "Mayham"), uncredited
2007	K-Ville	Lana Roberts	1 episode ("AKA")
2011–2013	Homeland	Dana Brody	36 episodes

=== Theatre ===
Year	Title	Role	Notes
2014	When We Were Young and Unafraid	Penny	Manhattan Theatre Club

== Awards and nominations ==
Year	Ceremony	Category	Work	Result	Ref.
2013	Screen Actors Guild Awards	Outstanding Performance by an Ensemble in a Drama Series (shared with cast)	Homeland	Nominated	
2014	Screen Actors Guild Awards	Outstanding Performance by an Ensemble in a Drama Series (shared with cast)	Homeland	Nominated	
