= List of Liv Tyler performances =

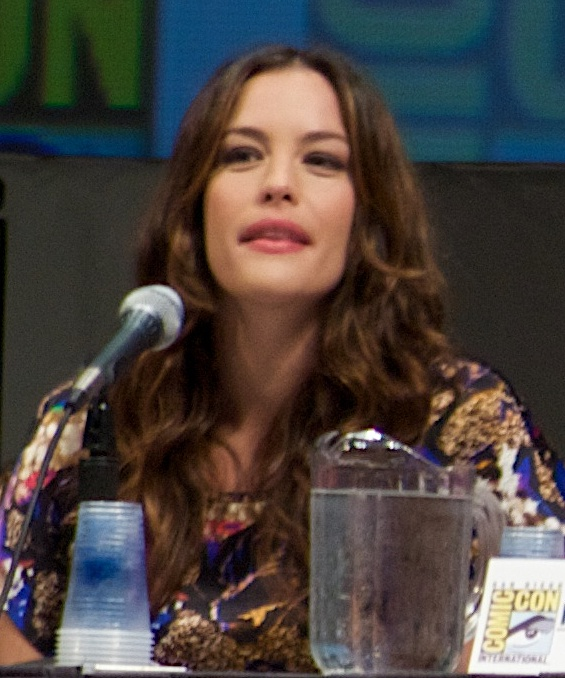
Tyler in 2010

Liv Tyler is an American actress of film and television. She made her film debut in the psychological thriller Silent Fall (1994), followed by a leading role in the independent drama film Heavy (1995), directed by James Mangold. She gained further recognition for her role in the coming-of-age comedy Empire Records (1995). Tyler had her international breakthrough portraying an American teenager visiting her deceased mother's friends in an Italian villa in Bernardo Bertolucci's drama Stealing Beauty (1996). She followed this with a supporting role in the musical period comedy That Thing You Do! (1996), and the period drama Inventing the Abbotts (1997). She was subsequently cast in a lead role in the blockbuster disaster film Armageddon (1998).

Tyler subsequently starred in the British historical comedy film Plunkett & Macleane (1999), followed by Onegin (also 1999), for which she was nominated for a Russian Guild of Film Critics Award for Best Foreign Actress. She followed this with supporting roles in two Robert Altman films: Cookie's Fortune (1999) and Dr. T & the Women (2000). In 2001, Tyler starred as Arwen Undómiel in Peter Jackson's The Lord of the Rings: The Fellowship of the Ring, followed by its two sequels: The Two Towers (2002) and The Return of the King (2003). The following year, Tyler appeared in Kevin Smith's comedy Jersey Girl, followed by a role in Steve Buscemi's independent drama Lonesome Jim (2005).

In 2007, Tyler appeared in the drama Reign Over Me, followed by a lead role in the horror film The Strangers (2008), which was a box-office hit. The same year, she starred in the superhero film The Incredible Hulk, opposite Edward Norton. Subsequent roles include the black comedy Super (2010), the supernatural horror film Jamie Marks Is Dead (2014), and the science fiction comedy Space Station 76 (also 2014). Between 2014 and 2017, Tyler made her television acting debut with a main role on the supernatural drama series The Leftovers. From 2018 to 2019, Tyler appeared in a lead role on the Hulu drama series Harlots. In 2019, she co-starred in the science fiction drama film Ad Astra.

== Film ==
Year	Film	Role	Notes	Ref.
1994	Silent Fall	Sylvie Warden		
1995	Heavy	Callie		
1995	Empire Records	Corey Mason		
1996	Stealing Beauty	Lucy Harmon		
1996	That Thing You Do!	Faye Dolan		
1997	Inventing the Abbotts	Pamela Abbott		
1997	U Turn	Girl in Bus Station	Cameo appearance	
1998	Armageddon	Grace Stamper		
1999	Plunkett & Macleane	Lady Rebecca Gibson		
1999	Cookie's Fortune	Emma Duvall		
1999	Onegin	Tatyana Larina		
2000	Dr. T & the Women	Marilyn		
2001	One Night at McCool's	Jewel		
2001	The Lord of the Rings: The Fellowship of the Ring	Arwen Undómiel		
2002	The Lord of the Rings: The Two Towers	Arwen Undómiel		
2003	The Lord of the Rings: The Return of the King	Arwen Undómiel		
2004	Jersey Girl	Maya Harding		
2005	Lonesome Jim	Anika		
2007	Reign Over Me	Dr. Angela Oakhurst		
2008	The Strangers	Kristen McKay		
2008	The Incredible Hulk	Betty Ross		
2008	Smother	Clare Cooper		
2010	Super	Sarah Helgeland		
2011	The Ledge	Shana		
2012	Robot & Frank	Madison Weld		
2014	Jamie Marks Is Dead	Linda McCormick		
2014	Space Station 76	Jessica Marlowe		
2018	Wildling	Ellen Cooper	Also producer	
2019	Ad Astra	Eve McBride		
2021	Awaken	Herself	Storyteller	
2025	Captain America: Brave New World	Betty Ross	Cameo	

== Television ==
Year	Title	Role	Notes	Ref.
2014–2017	The Leftovers	Meg Abbott	Main role; 13 episodes	
2017	Gunpowder	Anne Vaux	Main role; 3 episodes	
2018–2019	Harlots	Lady Isabella Fitzwilliam	Main role; 16 episodes	
2020	9-1-1: Lone Star	Michelle Blake	Main role (season 1); 10 episodes	

== Video games ==
Year	Title	Role	Notes	Ref.
2008	The Incredible Hulk	Betty Ross	Voice role	
