= Jacqueline Castel =

American film director and screenwriter

- Education: New York University
- Occupations: Film director, screenwriter
- Years active: 2009–present
- Website: www.jacquelinecastel.com

Jacqueline Castel is an American-born French and Canadian film director, screenwriter, and curator based in New York City. Her debut feature film, My Animal, starring Bobbi Salvör Menuez and Amandla Stenberg, world premiered at the Sundance Film Festival in 2023 and was released theatrically by Paramount.

Castel has written for and directed such established auteurs as John Carpenter and Jim Jarmusch, and has collaborated with David Lynch. She is the in-house director for the record label Sacred Bones Records, and has directed music videos for Alan Vega, Zola Jesus, The Soft Moon, and Pharmakon.

== Early life ==
Castel moved to New York City to attend NYU Film School and worked at Kim's Video and Music in the East Village. She met Sacred Bones Records founder Caleb Braaten while hosting a show at WNYU Radio, and began directing music videos for the label.

== Career ==
In 2011, Fader magazine named Castel a "Video Director to Watch," for her music video work. In 2012, she released early short film Twelve Dark Noons as the first film release on the Sacred Bones imprint, which premiered at South by Southwest. Her 2014 short documentary 13 Torches For A Burn focused on the contemporary underground Danish music scene, and spotlighted the punk band Iceage. Castel's short film The Puppet Man world-premiered at the Sundance Film Festival in 2016 and featured the acting debut of fashion model Crystal Renn.

In 2016, Castel began work as director on the feature-length documentary A Message from the Temple, about Thee Temple Ov Psychick Youth, featuring English experimental singer and performance artist Genesis P-Orridge. Castel presented footage from the film-in-progress in 2020 at Anthology Film Archives and in 2022 at "Breyer P-Orridge: We Are But One" at Pioneer Works, the first posthumous retrospective of the artist's work.

In 2017 she co-wrote an erotic thriller with Sasha Grey.

In 2018 Castel collaborated with David Lynch on short film "Curtains Up," an adaptation of his book, Catching the Big Fish about Transcendental Meditation. It premiered at Lynch's Festival of Disruption.

In 2020, Castel directed the short documentary "The Mother Stone," a portrait of actor and musician Caleb Landry Jones. In 2021, she released the short “A Slice of a Dream,” featuring Jones and his partner, artist Katya Zvereva.

In 2023, she directed romance horror My Animal, from a script written by Jae Matthews of electronic group Boy Harsher.

== Personal life ==
Castel is the granddaughter of French and Canadian law professor Jean-Gabriel Castel. She is the partner of writer and historian Mitch Horowitz.

== Music videos ==
Castel has directed the following:

- Alan Vega - "Nike Soldier"
- Blank Dogs - "Setting Fire To Your House"
- Caleb Landry Jones - "The Loon"
- Gary War - "Highspeed Drift"
- Getting The Fear - "Against the Wind"
- Jim Jarmusch & Jozef van Wissem - "Etimasia"
- Moon Duo - "Killing Time"
- Naked on the Vague - "Clock of 12's"
- Pharmakon - "Bestial Burden"
- Pharmakon - "Devour"
- Pop. 1280 - "Bodies In The Dunes"
- Pop. 1280 - "Step Into The Grid"
- The Soft Moon - "Insides"
- Zola Jesus - "Clay Bodies"
- Zola Jesus - "Exhumed"
- Zola Jesus - "Nail"
- Zola Jesus - "Night"
- Zola Jesus - "Sea Talk"
- Zola Jesus - "Seekir"
- Zola Jesus - "Vessel"
- Uniform - "Dispatches From The Gutter"
- U.S. Girls - "Red Ford Radio"
