= Blow the Man Down (film) =

2019 American drama mystery film

- Official poster
- Directed by: Bridget Savage Cole; Danielle Krudy
- Written by: Bridget Savage Cole; Danielle Krudy
- Produced by: Alex Scharfman; Drew Houpt; Tim Headington; Lia Buman
- Starring: Morgan Saylor; Sophie Lowe; Annette O'Toole; Marceline Hugot; Gayle Rankin; Will Brittain; Skipp Sudduth; Ebon Moss-Bachrach; June Squibb; Margo Martindale
- Cinematography: Todd Banhazl
- Edited by: Marc Vives
- Music by: Brian McOmber; Jordan Dykstra
- Production companies: Secret Engine; Tango Entertainment
- Distributed by: Amazon Studios
- Release dates: April 26, 2019 (Tribeca); March 20, 2020 (United States)
- Running time: 91 minutes
- Country: United States
- Language: English

Blow the Man Down is a 2019 American black comedy thriller film, written and directed by Bridget Savage Cole and Danielle Krudy. It stars Morgan Saylor, Sophie Lowe, Annette O'Toole, Marceline Hugot, Gayle Rankin, Will Brittain, Skipp Sudduth, Ebon Moss-Bachrach, June Squibb, and Margo Martindale.

It had its world premiere at the Tribeca Film Festival on April 26, 2019. It was released on March 20, 2020, by Amazon Studios.

== Plot ==
Priscilla and Mary Beth Connolly are sisters living in the small fishing town of Easter Cove, Maine. Their mother Mary Margaret has died, and family friends Doreen Burke, Susie Gallagher, and Gail Maguire offer condolences at her wake. The sisters argue after Mary Beth learns that their mother took out a loan for the struggling family fishmonger business, which could jeopardize their house.

At a bar, Mary Beth drinks with a stranger named Gorski. Driving him home in his car, she is unnerved by a gun in his glove compartment, and crashes the car when he caresses her leg. Inspecting the damage, she sees blood and a woman's belongings inside the trunk, and flees. When Gorski follows her, she stabs him with a harpoon and bashes his head in with a brick.

Mary Beth returns home to a shocked Priscilla, who calls the police but hangs up. The sisters use Priscilla's knife to chop up Gorski's corpse to fit in a cooler box, which they throw in the ocean. The next day, Priscilla cannot find the knife, inscribed with 'Connolly Fish', and Mary Beth searches Gorski's shack; she can't find the knife, but instead finds $50,000 in cash.

Local police officer Justin Brennan borrows the Connolly's boat to pick up a body washed up on shore, which is not Gorski but a prostitute named Dee, who was shot. Doreen, Susie, and Gail confront Dee's employer Enid Devlin, a longtime friend of Mary Margaret who runs the 'Oceanview', the town brothel. Refusing to give up her business, Enid goes looking for Gorski, who worked for her, and finds Priscilla's bloody knife.

Doreen, Susie, and Gail reach out to Alexis, one of Enid's girls who was close with Dee, but she rejects their help. Enid is questioned by Brennan and Officer Coletti, who has known Enid for years and warns off his younger partner, but Brennan is unconvinced. Enid's suspicions about the knife are confirmed when she notices Mary Beth spending the cash, and Priscilla's bloody boots, and she tells the sisters that they can always come to her for help.

Priscilla and Mary Beth visit Doreen, who reveals that years ago she, Susie, Gail, and Mary Margaret made a decision: to protect their own daughters from the men passing through the local port, they allowed Enid to operate the Oceanview as a brothel. Mary Beth shows Priscilla the money, and Brennan and Coletti find Gorski's car with the gun and bloody evidence inside.

Enid blackmails the Connolly sisters to return the money in exchange for the knife. The sisters decide to go to the police, but after Brennan, who is attracted to Priscilla, unexpectedly joins them for dinner and asks about the call made to the police the night of the murder, they change their mind about confessing. Alexis, knowing that Dee had stolen money from Enid's safe, tells Susie that she believes Enid had Dee killed. Brennan learns that Mary Beth was seen with Gorski the night he disappeared, realizing Priscilla lied to him.

Gail, Susie, and Doreen warn Enid that she and her business have crossed a line. The Connolly sisters return the money to Enid, who drunkenly tells them how much she misses their mother, who left the brothel business for her daughters' sake. She offers them some of the money and jobs managing the brothel, but they refuse, leaving with the knife. Alexis, knowing that Dee stole the money from Enid, who had Gorski kill her, smothers Enid to death with a pillow, takes the money and drives away from the town together with one of the other brothel girls.

Doreen spots the Connollys' cooler, which has floated to shore. On information from Gail, Susie, and Doreen, Coletti prepares to close down Oceanview. He and Brennan see the Connolly sisters walking in the street, but Brennan has changed his mind about Priscilla. She and Mary Beth pass by Gail, Doreen, and Susie, who are singing "Blow the Man Down" as they properly dispose of Gorski's body; the sisters realize Susie is washing out the incriminating cooler, and she smiles at them.

== Cast ==
- Morgan Saylor as Mary Beth Connolly
- Sophie Lowe as Priscilla Connolly
- Annette O'Toole as Gail Maguire
- Marceline Hugot as Doreen Burke
- Gayle Rankin as Alexis
- Will Brittain as Officer Justin Brennan
- Skipp Sudduth as Officer Coletti
- Ebon Moss-Bachrach as Gorski
- June Squibb as Susie Gallagher
- Margo Martindale as Enid Nora Devlin

== Production ==
Filming began in March 2018 in Harpswell, Maine. The name of the town in the film is changed to Easter Cove, Maine.

The film includes several sea shanties sung on camera, most led by David Coffin.

== Release ==
It had its world premiere at the Tribeca Film Festival on April 26, 2019. Shortly after, Amazon Studios acquired distribution rights to the film. It also screened at the Toronto International Film Festival on September 12, 2019. It was released exclusively on Amazon Prime Video on March 20, 2020.

== Critical reception ==
Blow the Man Down received positive reviews from film critics. It holds a 98% approval rating on review aggregator website Rotten Tomatoes, based on 120 reviews, with an average of 7.6/10. The site's critical consensus reads, "Clever, funny, and original, Blow the Man Down is one hell of a ride that should not be missed." On Metacritic, the film holds a rating of 72 out of 100, based on 20 critics, indicating "generally favorable" reviews.

=== Accolades ===
List of awards and nominations for Blow the Man Down
Year	Award	Category	Recipient(s)	Result	Ref.
2019	Philadelphia Film Festival	Best Narrative Feature	Bridget Savage Cole & Danielle Krudy	Nominated	
2019	Philadelphia Film Festival	Best First Feature	Bridget Savage Cole & Danielle Krudy	Nominated	
2019	Tribeca Film Festival	Best Screenplay	Bridget Savage Cole & Danielle Krudy	Won	
2019	Tribeca Film Festival	Best Narrative Feature	Bridget Savage Cole & Danielle Krudy	Nominated	
2020	Hollywood Critics Association Midseason Award	Best Picture	Blow the Man Down	Nominated	
2020	Hollywood Critics Association Midseason Award	Best Indie Film	Blow the Man Down	Nominated	
2020	Palm Springs International Film Festival	New Voices/New Visions Grand Jury Prize	Bridget Savage Cole & Danielle Krudy	Nominated	
2020	Independent Spirit Awards	Best First Screenplay	Bridget Savage Cole & Danielle Krudy	Nominated	
2020	Glasgow Film Festival	Audience Award	Bridget Savage Cole & Danielle Krudy	Nominated	
2021	Golden Tomato Awards	Best-Reviewed Thriller of 2020	Blow the Man Down	Won	
2021	Chlotrudis Award	Best Performance by an Ensemble Cast	The cast of Blow the Man Down	Nominated	
