= List of awards and nominations received by Rosario Dawson =

Rosario Dawson awards and nominations
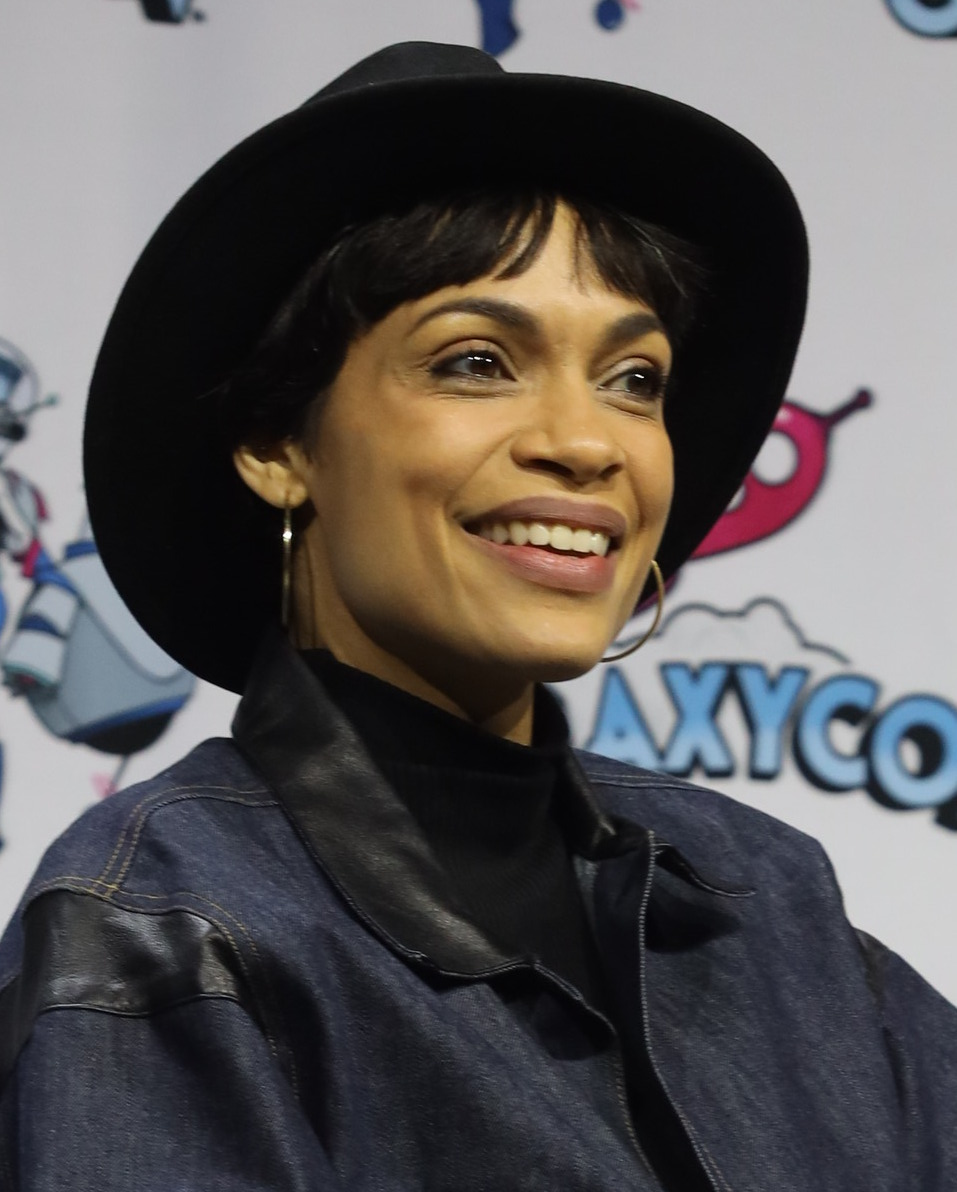
- Dawson in 2022
Awards and nominations
Award	Wins	Nominations
ALMA Awards	2	5
Black Reel Awards	0	12
NAACP Image Awards	1	4
MTV Movie Awards	0	2
Satellite Awards	1	1
Saturn Awards	1	2
Streamy Awards	1	1
Teen Choice Awards	0	4

Totals (Note: Certain award groups do not simply award one winner. They acknowledge several different recipients, have runners-up, and have third place. Since this is a specific recognition and is different from losing an award, runner-up mentions are considered wins in this award tally. For simplification and to avoid errors, each award in this list has been presumed to have had a prior nomination.)
- Wins: 11
- Nominations: 46

This is a list of awards and nominations for actress Rosario Dawson.

== ALMA Awards ==
Year	Category	Nominated work	Result	Ref.
2006	Outstanding Supporting Actress in a Motion Picture	Rent	Nominated	
2009	Actress in Singing	Seven Pounds	Nominated	
2011	Favorite Movie Actress – Drama/Adventure	Unstoppable	Nominated	
2013	Community Service Award	—N/a	Won	
2014	Special Achievement in Film	—N/a	Won	

== American Black Film Festival ==
Year	Category	Nominated work	Result	Ref.
2004	Rising Star	—N/a	Won	

== Astra TV Awards ==
Year	Category	Nominated work	Result	Ref.
2024	Best Actress in a Streaming Drama Series	Ahsoka	Nominated	

== BET Awards ==
Year	Category	Nominated work	Result	Ref.
2009	Best Actress	Eagle Eye/Seven Pounds	Nominated	

== Black Movie Awards ==
Year	Category	Nominated work	Result	Ref.
2006	Outstanding Performance by an Actress in a Supporting Role	Rent	Nominated	

== Black Reel Awards ==
Year	Category	Nominated work	Result	Ref.
2003	Outstanding Supporting Actress	25th Hour	Nominated	
2006	Outstanding Supporting Actress	Sin City	Nominated	
2006	Outstanding Actress	Rent	Nominated	
2006	Outstanding Ensemble	Rent	Nominated	
2012	Outstanding Actress, TV Movie or Limited Series	Five	Nominated	
2014	Outstanding Actress	Trance	Nominated	
2015	Outstanding Actress	Top Five	Nominated	
2021	Outstanding Guest Actress, Drama Series	The Mandalorian	Nominated	
2022	Outstanding Guest Actress, Drama Series	The Book of Boba Fett	Nominated	
2022	Outstanding Actress, TV Movie or Limited Series	DMZ	Nominated	
2022	Outstanding Supporting Actress, TV Movie or Limited Series	Dopesick	Nominated	
2024	Outstanding Lead Performance, Drama Series	Ahsoka	Nominated	

== Critics' Choice Awards ==
Year	Category	Nominated work	Result	Ref.
Critics' Choice Movie Awards
2006	Best Acting Ensemble	Rent	Nominated	
2006	Best Acting Ensemble	Sin City	Nominated	
2015	Best Actress in a Comedy	Top Five	Nominated	
Critics' Choice Super Awards
2024	Best Actress in a Science Fiction/Fantasy Series	Ahsoka	Nominated	
2024	Best Actress in a Superhero Series	Ahsoka	Nominated	

== Imagen Foundation Awards ==
Year	Category	Nominated work	Result	Ref.
2012	Best Actress/Television	Five	Nominated	
2014	Best Actress/Supporting Actress – Feature Film	Cesar Chavez	Nominated	
2015	Best Actress – Feature Film	Top Five	Nominated	

== NAACP Image Award ==
Year	Category	Nominated work	Result	Ref.
2000	Outstanding Actress in a Motion Picture	Light It Up	Nominated	
2006	Outstanding Actress in a Motion Picture	Rent	Nominated	
2009	Outstanding Actress in a Motion Picture	Seven Pounds	Won	
2012	Outstanding Actress in a Television Movie, Mini-Series or Dramatic Special	Five	Nominated	

== MTV Movie Awards ==
Year	Category	Nominated work	Result	Ref.
2006	Best Kiss	Sin City	Nominated	
2015	Best WTF Moment	Top Five	Nominated	

== Nickelodeon Kids' Choice Awards ==
Year	Category	Nominated work	Result	Ref.
2024	Favorite Female TV Star (Family)	Ahsoka	Nominated	

== Online Film & Television Association Award ==
Year	Category	Nominated work	Result	Ref.
2006	Best Music, Adapted Song	Rent	Nominated	

== Satellite Awards ==
Year	Category	Nominated work	Result	Ref.
2005	Best Supporting Actress – Motion Picture	Rent	Won	

== Saturn Awards ==
Year	Category	Nominated work	Result	Ref.
2022	Best Guest Starring Role in a Streaming Series	The Mandalorian	Nominated	
2025	Best Actress on Television	Ahsoka	Won	

== ShoWest Convention ==
Year	Category	Nominated work	Result	Ref.
2007	Supporting Actress of the Year	Rent	Won	

== Spike Video Game Awards ==
Year	Category	Nominated work	Result	Ref.
2006	Gamer's Choice: Breakthrough Performance	Marc Eckō's Getting Up: Contents Under Pressure	Won	

== Streamy Awards ==
Year	Category	Nominated work	Result	Ref.
2009	Best Female Actor in a Dramatic Web Series	Gemini Division	Won	

== Sundance Film Festival ==
Year	Category	Nominated work	Result	Ref.
2006	Dramatic, Dor the Ensemble Cast	A Guide to Recognizing Your Saints	Won	

== Teen Choice Awards ==
Year	Category	Nominated work	Result	Ref.
2001	Film – Choice Breakout Performance	Josie and the Pussycats	Nominated	
2010	Choice Movie Actress: Fantasy	Percy Jackson & the Olympians: The Lightning Thief	Nominated	
2011	Choice Movie Actress: Action	Unstoppable	Nominated	
2011	Choice Summer Movie Star: Female	Zookeeper	Nominated	

== Women Film Critics Circle ==
Year	Category	Nominated work	Result	Ref.
2014	Acting and Activism Award	—N/a	Won	
