= Rosario Dawson =

American actress (born 1979)

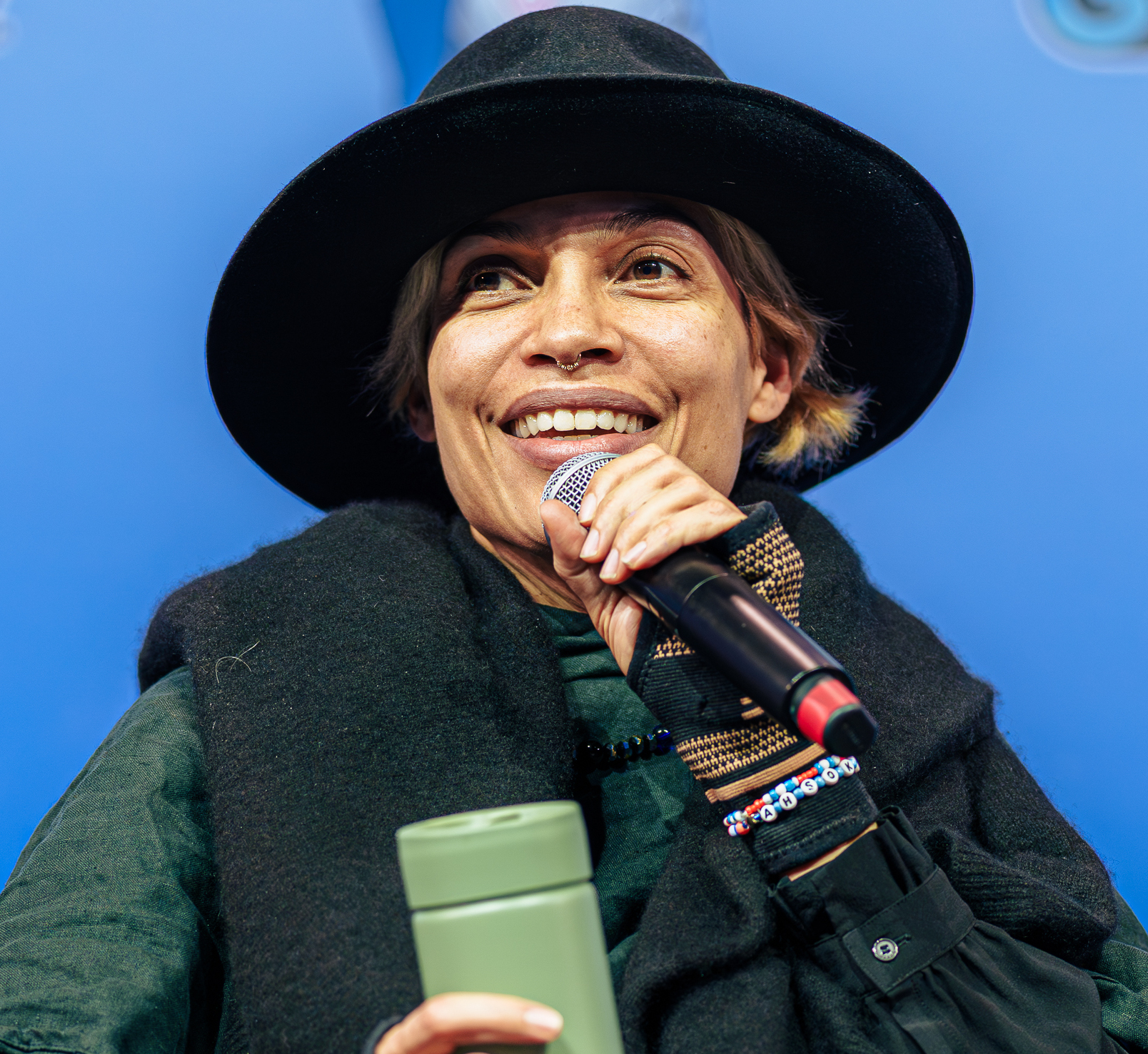
- Dawson in 2025
- Born: Rosario Isabel Dawson; May 9, 1979 (age 47); Manhattan, New York City, U.S.
- Occupations: Actress; activist
- Years active: 1994–present
- Partner: Cory Booker (2018–2022)
- Children: 1
- Awards: Full list

Rosario Isabel Dawson (born May 9, 1979) is an American actress and activist. She made her feature-film debut in the 1995 independent drama Kids. Her subsequent film roles include He Got Game (1998), Josie and the Pussycats (2001), 25th Hour (2002), Men in Black II (2002), The Rundown (2003), Rent (2005), Sin City (2005), Clerks II (2006), Death Proof (2007), Seven Pounds (2008), Percy Jackson & the Olympians: The Lightning Thief (2010), Unstoppable (2010), Zookeeper (2011), Trance (2013), Top Five (2014), Zombieland: Double Tap (2019), Clerks 3 (2022), and Haunted Mansion (2023). Dawson has provided voice-over work for Disney/Marvel Comics, and Skydance Corporation/DC Comics/Nickelodeon. She is also recognized for her portrayal of the live-action Ahsoka Tano in the Star Wars franchise.

Dawson had several roles in film and television adaptations of comic books. These include Gail in Sin City (2005) and Sin City: A Dame to Kill For (2014), Claire Temple in five television series of the Marvel Cinematic Universe (2015–2018), and providing the voices of Diana Prince / Wonder Woman in the DC Animated Movie Universe and Space Jam: A New Legacy and Barbara Gordon / Batgirl in The Lego Batman Movie. In 2021, she had a recurring role in the Dwayne Johnson autobiographical comedy series Young Rock and a main role in the Hulu miniseries Dopesick.

== Early life ==
Rosario Isabel Dawson was born on May 9, 1979, in Manhattan, New York City. Her mother, Isabel Celeste, is of Puerto Rican, Cuban, ancestry. Isabel was 17 years old when Rosario was born; she never married Rosario's biological father, Patrick C. Harris. When Dawson was a year old, Isabel married Greg Dawson, a construction worker. Isabel and Greg moved into a reclaimed building on East 13th Street in Alphabet City, Manhattan after being approved as members of an affordable housing plan. The family later moved to Garland, Texas.

== Career ==
=== 1995–2001: Early days ===
As a child, Dawson made a brief appearance on Sesame Street. At the age of 15, she was discovered on her front-porch step by photographer Larry Clark and Harmony Korine, with Korine deciding that she was perfect for a part he had written in his screenplay for the controversial 1995 film Kids. She went on to star in varied roles in independent films and blockbusters, such as He Got Game, Men in Black II, and Rent.

In 1998, Dawson provided an introductory voice-over for the remixed version of Prince's single "1999". The voice-over was a commentary on the state of the world in the next to last year before the new millennium. The following year, she appeared in The Chemical Brothers' video for the song "Out of Control" from the album Surrender. She is also featured on the track "She Lives in My Lap" from the second disc of the OutKast album Speakerboxxx/The Love Below, in which she speaks the introduction and a brief interlude towards the end.

In 2001, she appeared in the film Josie and the Pussycats as band member Valerie Brown, and had a role in Chelsea Walls, the directorial debut of Ethan Hawke.

=== 2002–2014: Career progression ===
Dawson starred opposite Edward Norton in the Spike Lee drama 25th Hour (2002). In the same year, her role of Laura Vasquez in the blockbuster Men in Black II proved to be a turning point in her career.

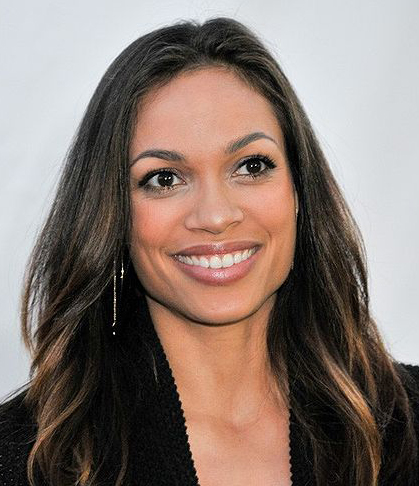
Dawson at the 1st Streamy Awards in March 2009

She played a supporting role in 2003 action comedy The Rundown, also known as Welcome to the Jungle, opposite Dwayne Johnson, Sean William Scott, and Christopher Walken, which was received well, but failed commercially. In Oliver Stone's 2004 film Alexander, she portrayed Roxana, the wife of Alexander the Great. The film had a mixed reception and underperformed financially. A controversial nude scene depicted Alexander's attempted rape of Roxana, her resistance, and a subsequent sexual encounter after a gift offering. In 2005, Dawson made her stage debut as Julia in the Public Theater's "Shakespeare in the Park" revival of the musical Two Gentlemen of Verona.

In the film adaptation of the popular musical Rent in 2005, she played exotic dancer Mimi Marquez, replacing Daphne Rubin-Vega, who was pregnant and unable to play the part. For her role in Rent, Dawson won the Satellite Award for Best Supporting Actress – Motion Picture. She also appeared in the adaptation of the graphic novel Sin City, co-directed by Robert Rodriguez and Frank Miller, portraying Gail, a prostitute-dominatrix. Also that year, she appeared in a deleted scene in the Rob Zombie film The Devil's Rejects. The scene was included in the deleted scenes on the DVD release.

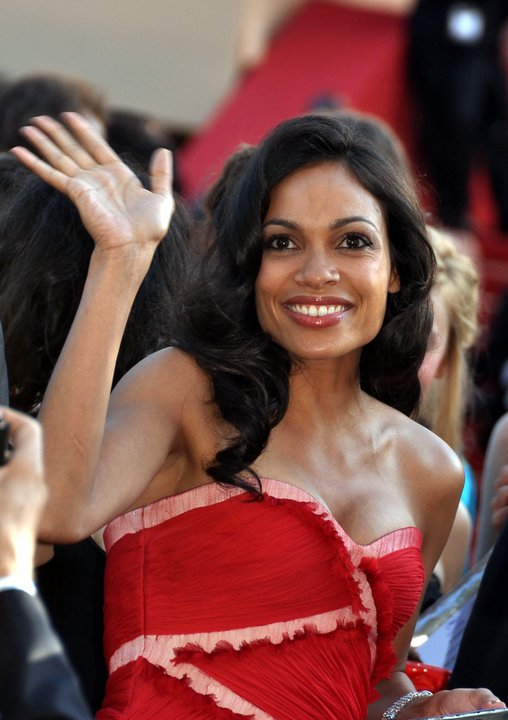
Dawson at the 2011 Cannes Film Festival

She starred as Becky in Clerks II (2006). In Back to the Well, a documentary about the making of the series, she stated that the donkey show sequence was what made her decide to take the role. In May of the same year, Dawson co-created and co-wrote the comic-book miniseries Occult Crimes Taskforce. She was at the 2007 San Diego Comic-Con to promote the comic. She co-starred with former Rent alumna Tracie Thoms in the Quentin Tarantino throwback film Death Proof in 2007, part of the Tarantino/Robert Rodriguez double feature Grindhouse. She produced and starred in Descent alongside friend Talia Lugacy, whom she met at the Lee Strasberg Academy. On July 7, 2007, Dawson presented at the American leg of Live Earth.

In 2008, Dawson starred with Will Smith in Seven Pounds and in Eagle Eye, produced by Steven Spielberg. Beginning in August, she starred in Gemini Division, an online science-fiction series. In the animated series Afterworld, she voiced Officer Delondre Baines. On January 17, 2009, Dawson hosted Saturday Night Live. Later in the year, she voiced Artemis of Bana-Mighdall in the animated film Wonder Woman.

In 2009, Dawson performed in The People Speak, a documentary feature film that uses dramatic and musical performances of the letters, diaries, and speeches of everyday Americans, based on historian Howard Zinn's A People's History of the United States. In 2009, Dawson also voiced the character of Velvet Von Black in Rob Zombie's animated feature, The Haunted World of El Superbeasto. For the Kasabian album West Ryder Pauper Lunatic Asylum, she is featured singing on the track "West Ryder Silver Bullet".

In 2010, she starred in the films Percy Jackson & the Olympians: The Lightning Thief as Persephone, and Unstoppable as railway yardmaster Connie Hooper. In 2013, she appeared in the independent film Gimme Shelter. Also in 2013, Dawson appeared in Danny Boyle's critically acclaimed psychological thriller Trance opposite James McAvoy. In the film, Dawson's full nudity, including a shaved vulva, was, according to her, crucial for the role and generated considerable attention and discussion.

She appeared in Top Five in 2014, for which she was nominated for the Critics' Choice Movie Award for Best Actress in a Comedy. The following year, she reprised her role as Gail in Sin City: A Dame to Kill For.

=== 2015–present: Daredevil and Ahsoka ===
In 2015, she played Claire Temple in the Marvel's Netflix television series, Daredevil (2015–2016), a role she reprised in Jessica Jones (2015) and Luke Cage (2016–2018). Dawson's likeness was also used in the Jessica Jones tie-in comic as her character on both shows. Dawson has continued this role in the series Iron Fist and The Defenders (both 2017). Dawson revealed in July 2026 that she had filmed a scene for the Marvel Cinematic Universe (MCU) film Spider-Man: Brand New Day (2026) reprising her role as Claire Temple that was cut from the final film. However, her scene was restored in its extended version, subtitled [Brand New] Brand New Day.

Between 2015 and 2017, she consistently lent her voice to six animated films. This included voicing Nyx in Tinker Bell and the Legend of the NeverBeast (2015), Wonder Woman in Justice League: Throne of Atlantis (2015), Justice League vs. Teen Titans (2016), and Justice League Dark (2017), Elaris in Ratchet & Clank (2016), and Batgirl in the commercial hit The Lego Batman Movie (2017). In 2018, she played the female lead role in the film Krystal.

In 2020, she was cast as the Star Wars character Ahsoka Tano in the second season of The Mandalorian on Disney+, and reprised the role in The Book of Boba Fett and the spinoff miniseries, Ahsoka. She wrote the foreword for the 2024 DK reference book, Star Wars Encyclopedia: The Comprehensive Guide to the Star Wars Galaxy.

In 2022, she reprised her role as Becky for Clerks III (2022).

== Activism and advocacy ==
=== Politics ===
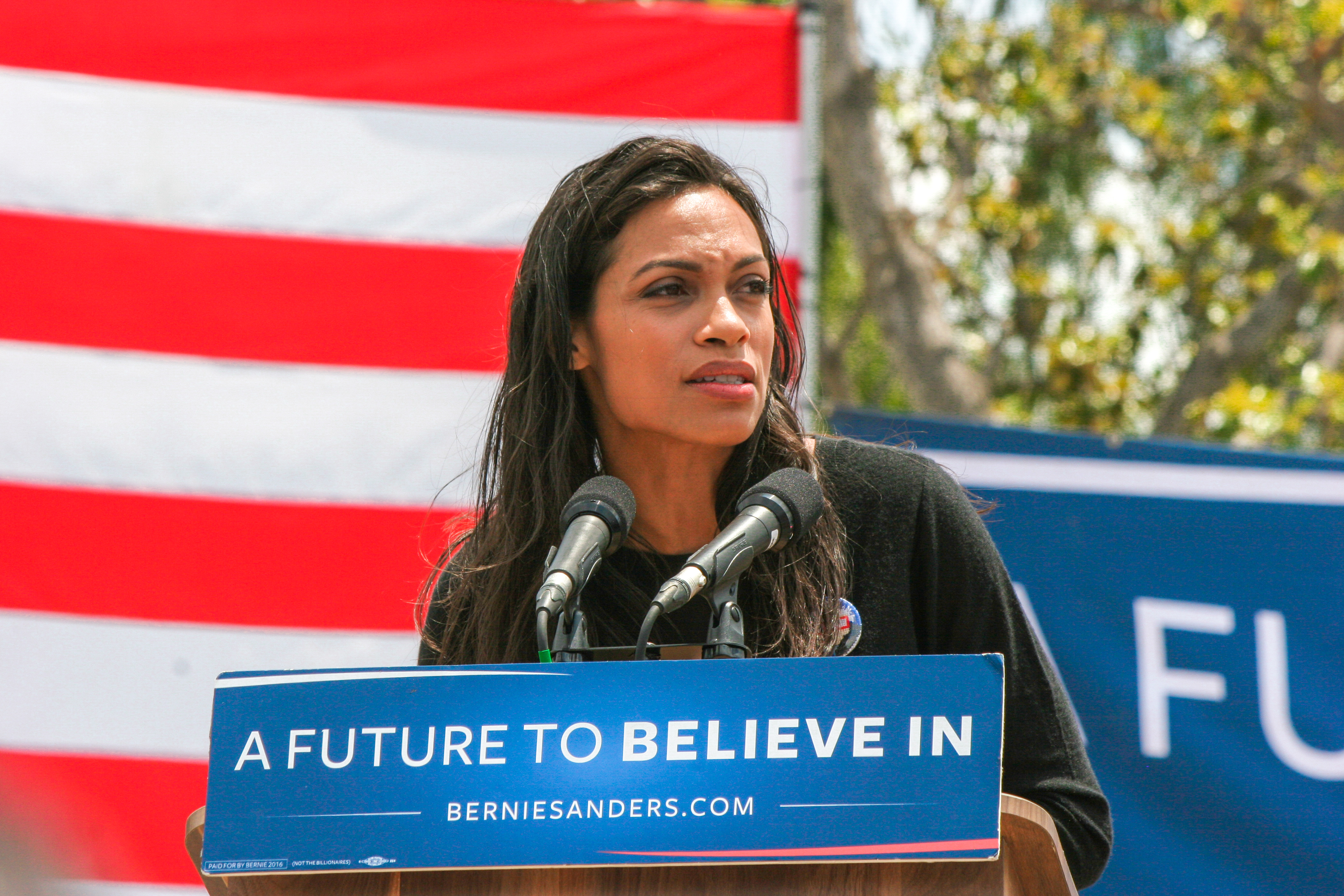
Dawson at the Bernie Sanders rally in East Los Angeles in May 2016

Dawson was arrested in 2004, while protesting against President George W. Bush.

Dawson endorsed Barack Obama for re-election in 2012, and Bernie Sanders for the Democratic nomination in the 2016 Democratic Party primaries. On April 15, 2016, Dawson was among the protesters arrested during Democracy Spring in Washington, DC.

In mid-2019, Dawson endorsed her then-boyfriend Cory Booker in the 2020 presidential election. Booker ended his campaign for president on January 13, 2020. Had she become First Lady of the United States, Dawson said she would have advocated for solutions to youth homelessness. On March 9, 2020, Dawson endorsed the presidential campaign of Bernie Sanders, whom she had also previously endorsed in his 2016 bid.

=== Philanthropy ===
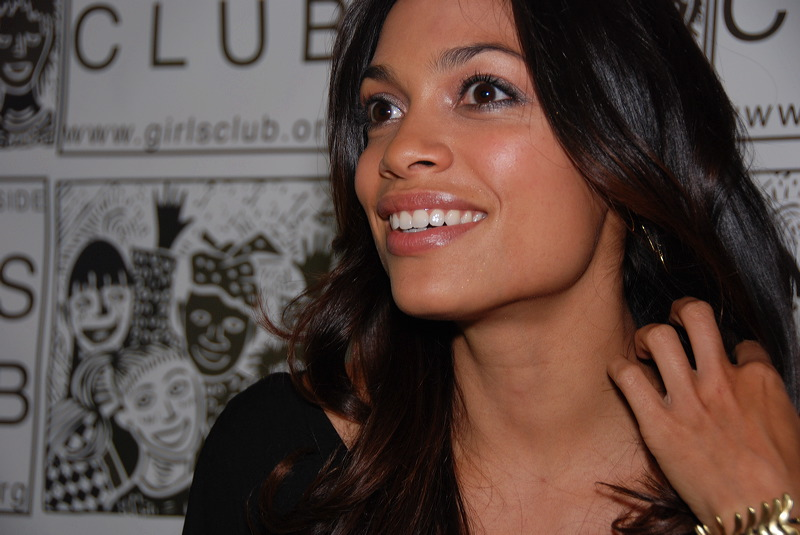
Dawson at the 2008 Willow Awards

Dawson is involved with the Lower East Side Girls Club and supports other charities such as environmental group Global Cool, One Campaign, Oxfam, Operation USA, Amnesty International, Parents, Families and Friends of Lesbians and Gays (PFLAG), the International Rescue Committee, Voto Latino, and Stay Close.org, a poster and public service advertising campaign for PFLAG, where she is featured with her uncle Frank Jump. She has participated in the Vagina Monologues and serves on the board for V-Day, a global non-profit movement that raises funds for women's anti-violence groups through benefits of this play.

In October 2008, Dawson became a spokeswoman for TripAdvisor.com's philanthropy program, More Than Footprints, Conservation International, Doctors Without Borders, National Geographic Society, The Nature Conservancy, and Save the Children. Also in October 2008, she lent her voice to the RESPECT! Campaign, a movement aimed at preventing domestic violence. She recorded a voice message for the Giverespect.org Web site, stressing the importance of respect in helping stop domestic violence. In 2012, Dawson partnered with SodaStream International in launching the first annual Unbottle the World Day, a campaign conceived in an effort to raise awareness to the impact of cans and plastic bottles on the environment.

== Personal life ==
Dawson is a self-professed Trekkie, who mentioned both her brothers' and her love of Star Trek in an interview with Conan O'Brien.

Dawson adopted a 12-year-old girl, Isabella, in 2014. In December 2023, Dawson announced that Isabella was pregnant and her first grandchild was scheduled to be born in 2024.

From December 2018 until February 2022, Dawson was in a relationship with US Senator Cory Booker.

In 2018, Dawson made a post to Instagram that was widely perceived as her coming out as queer; when asked about this in a 2020 interview, she stated that this had not been her intention, and further specified that although "People kept saying that I [came out]... I didn't do that, ... I mean, it's not inaccurate, but I never did come out. I mean, I guess I am now ... I've never had a relationship in that space, so it's never felt like an authentic calling to me." A representative of Dawson later clarified to The Daily Beast that she meant to say she came out as an ally of the LGBTQ community.

In October 2019, Dedrek Finley filed a case in Los Angeles against Dawson and her family for alleged incidents involving discrimination, verbal abuse, misgendering, and physical assault. Finley had been employed as a handyman, living with the family, and had known them for decades. In August 2020, the plaintiff dropped 18 of the 20 accusations, leaving two claims related to the alleged assault. The remaining claims were dismissed by a Los Angeles Superior Court in May 2021, after requests for documentation, answers to questions, and a medical examination went unanswered.

== Filmography ==
=== Film ===
Year	Title	Role	Notes
1995	Kids	Ruby	
1997	Girls' Night Out	Girl	Short film
1998	He Got Game	Lala Bonilla	
1998	Side Streets	Marisol Hidalgo	
1999	Light It Up	Stephanie Williams	
2000	Down to You	Lana	
2000	King of the Jungle	Veronica	
2001	Josie and the Pussycats	Valerie Brown	
2001	Sidewalks of New York	Maria Tedesko	
2001	Trigger Happy	Dee	
2001	Chelsea Walls	Audrey	
2002	Ash Wednesday	Grace Quinonez	
2002	The First $20 Million Is Always the Hardest	Alisa	
2002	Men in Black II	Laura Vasquez	
2002	The Adventures of Pluto Nash	Dina Lake	
2002	Love in the Time of Money	Anna	
2002	25th Hour	Naturelle Riviera	
2003	V-Day: Until the Violence Stops	Herself	
2003	This Girl's Life	Martine	
2003	Shattered Glass	Andy Fox	
2003	The Rundown	Mariana	
2004	Alexander	Roxana	
2005	This Revolution	Tina Santiago	
2005	Sin City	Gail	
2005	Little Black Dress	Haley	Short film
2005	Rent	Mimi Marquez	
2006	Clerks II	Rebecca "Becky" Scott	
2006	A Guide to Recognizing Your Saints	Laurie	
2007	Death Proof (Grindhouse)	Abernathy Ross	
2007	Descent	Maya	Also producer
2008	Explicit Ills	Babo's Mom	
2008	Eagle Eye	Zoe Perez	
2008	Killshot	Donna	
2008	Seven Pounds	Emily Posa	
2009	Wonder Woman	Artemis	Voice
2009	The Haunted World of El Superbeasto	Velvet Von Black	Voice
2009	The People Speak	Herself	
2010	Awake	Robin	Short film
2010	Percy Jackson & the Olympians: The Lightning Thief	Persephone	
2010	Unstoppable	Connie Hooper	
2011	Miss Representation	Herself	
2011	Girl Walks into a Bar	June	
2011	Zookeeper	Kate	
2011	10 Years	Mary	
2012	Fire with Fire	Talia Durham	
2012	Hotel Noir	Sevilla, the Maid	
2013	Trance	Elizabeth Lamb	
2013	Gimme Shelter	June Bailey	
2013	César Chávez	Dolores Huerta	
2013	Parts per Billion	Mia	
2013	Raze	Rachel	
2014	Sin City: A Dame to Kill For	Gail	
2014	The Ever After	Herself	
2014	The Captive	Nicole	
2014	Top Five	Chelsea Brown	
2015	Tinker Bell and the Legend of the NeverBeast	Nyx	Voice
2015	Justice League: Throne of Atlantis	Diana Prince / Wonder Woman	Voice
2015	Puerto Ricans in Paris	Vanessa	
2016	Justice League vs. Teen Titans	Diana Prince / Wonder Woman	Voice
2016	Ratchet & Clank	Elaris	Voice
2017	Justice League Dark	Diana Prince / Wonder Woman	Voice
2017	The Lego Batman Movie	Barbara Gordon / Batgirl	Voice
2017	Unforgettable	Julia Banks	
2017	Krystal	Krystal Bryant	
2018	The Death of Superman	Diana Prince / Wonder Woman	Voice
2018	The Need to Grow	Narrator	Voice, documentary
2018	Sorry to Bother You	Voice in Elevator	Voice
2018	Henchmen	Jolene	Voice
2019	Reign of the Supermen	Diana Prince / Wonder Woman	Voice
2019	Someone Great	Hannah Davis	
2019	Jay and Silent Bob Reboot	Reggie Faulken	
2019	Zombieland: Double Tap	Nevada	
2019	Wonder Woman: Bloodlines	Diana Prince / Wonder Woman	Voice
2019	The Deported	Herself	Documentary
2020	Justice League Dark: Apokolips War	Diana Prince / Wonder Woman	Voice
2020	The Water Man	Mary	
2020	Kiss the Ground	Herself	Documentary
2021	Space Jam: A New Legacy	Diana Prince / Wonder Woman	Voice Cameo
2022	Sell/Buy/Date	Herself	Documentary
2022	Clerks III	Becky Scott	
2023	Haunted Mansion	Gabbie	
2024	The 4:30 Movie	Aunt Connie	
2025	Opus	the Billie Holiday puppet (voice)	Cameo appearance
2026	Campeón Gabacho	Doble-Ú	
2026	Spider-Man: Brand New Day	Claire Temple	Deleted scene; Dawson appears in the film's extended version, subtitled [Brand New] Brand New Day
TBA	Midnight †	Grace	Post-production; also producer
TBA	Baton †		Post-production

=== Television ===
Year	Title	Role	Notes
2003	Punk'd	Herself	Episode #1.8
2007	Robot Chicken	Various	Voice, episode: "More Blood, More Chocolate"
2008	Gemini Division	Anna Diaz	Web series; 50 episodes Also executive producer
2009	Saturday Night Live	Herself	Episode: "Rosario Dawson/Fleet Foxes"
2009	SpongeBob SquarePants	Herself	Episode: "SpongeBob's Truth or Square"
2011	Five	Lili	Television film
2015–2016	Daredevil	Claire Temple	Series regular; 8 episodes
2015	Jessica Jones	Claire Temple	Episode: "AKA Smile"
2016–2018	Luke Cage	Claire Temple	Series regular; 11 episodes
2017	Iron Fist	Claire Temple	Series regular; 6 episodes
2017	The Defenders	Claire Temple	Series regular; 6 episodes
2017	Waves for Water	Herself	Documentary
2018–2019	Jane the Virgin	Jane "J.R." Ramos	17 episodes
2018	Elena of Avalor	Daria	Voice, 2 episodes
2019	Weird City	Delt	Episode: "A Family"
2020	The Last Kids on Earth	Rezzoch	Voice, 7 episodes
2020	Briarpatch	Allegra "Pick" Dill	Main role; 10 episodes
2020	Make It Work!	Herself	Television special
2020	The Mandalorian	Ahsoka Tano	Episode: "Chapter 13: The Jedi"
2020–2022	It's Pony	Penny Ramiro	Recurring role; 4 episodes
2021	Calls	Katherine	Voice, episode: "It's All In Your Head"
2021	Young Rock	General Monica Jackson	2 episodes
2021	Eden	A37	Voice, English dub
2021	Dopesick	Bridget Meyer	Miniseries
2021	AEW Dynamite	Herself	Episode #2.50
2021–2022	Go-Big Show	Herself (judge)	16 episodes
2022	The Book of Boba Fett	Ahsoka Tano	Episode: "Chapter 6: From the Desert Comes a Stranger"
2022	DMZ	Alma "Zee" Ortega	Miniseries
2022	Love, Death & Robots	Dr. Mirny	Voice, episode: "Swarm"
2023–present	Star Wars: Ahsoka	Ahsoka Tano	Main role; 8 episodes
2024	Ghosts of Ruin	Prism	Voice
2024	Terminator Zero	Kokoro	Voice
2025	Charlotte's Web	Edith Zuckerman	Voice

=== Music video appearances ===
Year	Title	Artist(s)	Notes
1999	"Out of Control"	The Chemical Brothers	
2002	"Miss You"	Aaliyah	Cameo
2010	"California Run"	Neil Nathan	Cameo
2012	"Supercool"	The Bullitts	
2016	"Where's the Love?"	The Black Eyed Peas featuring The World	
2017	"Family Feud"	Jay Z featuring Beyoncé	Promo video for Tidal
2018	"Earth Girls"	Jesse Boykins III	Cameo
2018	"10,000 Hours"	Fat Tony	Cameo
2018	"The Space Program"	A Tribe Called Quest	Cameo

=== Video games ===
Year	Title	Voice role(s)	Notes
2006	Marc Ecko's Getting Up: Contents Under Pressure	Tina	
2012	Syndicate	Lily Drawl	
2016	Ratchet & Clank	Elaris	
2016	Dishonored 2	Meagan Foster / Billie Lurk	
2016	Lego Dimensions	Barbara Gordon / Batgirl	Credited as Rasario Dawson
2017	Wilson's Heart	Elsa Wolcott	
2017	Dishonored: Death of the Outsider	Billie Lurk	
2019	NBA 2K20	Isa	MyCAREER Story
2022	Dying Light 2 Stay Human	Lawan	

=== Audiobooks ===
Year	Title	Author
2017	Artemis	Andy Weir

=== Audio ===
Year	Title	Role	Author	Production company
2021	Batman: The Audio Adventures	Selina Kyle / Catwoman	Dennis McNicholas	Blue Ribbon Content

== See also ==
- List of Afro-Latinos
- List of Puerto Ricans
