= My Animal (film) =

2023 film by Jacqueline Castel

- Theatrical release poster
- Directed by: Jacqueline Castel
- Written by: Jae Matthews
- Produced by: Andrew Bronfman; Michael Solomon
- Starring: Bobbi Salvör Menuez; Amandla Stenberg; Heidi von Palleske; Cory Lipman; Charles F. Halpenny; Harrison W Halpenny; Joe Apollonio; Scott Thompson; Dean McDermott; Stephen McHattie
- Cinematography: Bryn McCashin
- Edited by: Marc Boucrot; Jacqueline Castel
- Music by: Augustus Muller
- Production companies: Good Movies; Band with Pictures
- Distributed by: Photon Films (Canada); Paramount Global Content Distribution (International)
- Release dates: January 22, 2023 (Sundance); September 8, 2023
- Running time: 103 minutes
- Country: Canada
- Language: English
- Budget: $2.4 million

My Animal is a 2023 Canadian supernatural horror romance film directed by Jacqueline Castel in her feature directorial debut, and written by Jae Matthews. Starring Bobbi Salvör Menuez, Amandla Stenberg, Heidi von Palleske, Cory Lipman, Charles F. Halpenny, Harrison W Halpenny, Joe Apollonio, Scott Thompson, Dean McDermott, and Stephen McHattie, the film follows a young woman who is forced by her overbearing parents to keep her lycanthropy a secret until she begins to fall in love with a figure skater.

My Animal had its world premiere at the Sundance Film Festival, on 22 January 2023, and was later released in select theaters on 8 September 2023.

== Plot ==
One full moon night during the 1980s, Heather (Bobbi Salvör Menuez) turns into a wolf for the first time, attacking her human mother Patti and clawing her in the chest. Heather inherited this curse from her father Henry.

Years later, Heather works with Henry at a local diner and plays hockey with her younger twin brothers Cooper and Hardy, while Patti has turned to alcoholism.

Heather soon meets a young woman named Jonny (Amandla Stenberg), a figure skater who just moved into the neighborhood with her father. While Jonny has a boyfriend named Rick, he is less than pleasant to her. Heather and Jonny begin to bond and converse with Heather watching her skate at the local rink.

One night, Heather joins Jonny and her friends at a visit to a casino. As it is a full moon again, Heather transforms soon after she heads home, evading notice from her peers. The next morning after Heather is found unconscious and wrapped in a blanket at their doorstep, Patti and Henry remind her that she has to be more careful about transforming in public.

Heather and Jonny continue hanging out despite the close call. At one point, Heather has a fantasy where a naked Jonny is feeding her eggs. During one of these hangouts, Heather's younger brothers sneak into a bar and find her getting intimate with Jonny. The twins start distancing themselves from Heather, with Hardy acting especially cold toward her.

One night, Jonny takes Heather to her house where the two finally have sex. Heather has another fantasy where Jonny is naked and she removes Heather's underwear as they make out in the nude. However, Heather begins to showcase violent tendencies related to her lycanthropy, which disturbs Jonny. Soon after they have sex, Jonny stops interacting with Heather and begins to avoid her. Heather tries to reconnect to no avail.

Eventually, Heather is invited to a party where Jonny tearfully reveals to Heather that they "can't talk anymore." Devastated, Heather has a breakdown back at her house where she is comforted by Patti. Not long after, Henry dies of a heart attack at work with his body reverting to wolf form.

When Heather tries sitting with her brothers after giving herself a haircut, Hardy accuses her sexuality of causing their father's death. Cooper, who reconciled with Heather during Henry's funeral, fights Hardy in her defense. During this, Heather runs out of the house as Patti works to break up the fight between the twins.

Later, Heather heads to the bar to confront Jonny about avoiding her. While doing so, Heather is dragged outside by Rick who beats her up; however, Heather transforms during the beating, and she winds up killing Rick and then running off into the woods.

The next morning, Patti finds Heather naked, bruised, and blood-soaked in her bedroom. While bathing and healing Heather, Patti advises her to move out of their home as the town is no longer safe for her; Heather agrees, driving off into the night.

In a post-credits scene, Jonny's friend Otto is being interviewed about Rick's death. He tells the interviewer: "You can't mess with animals, man. Cardinal rule."

== Cast ==
- Bobbi Salvör Menuez as Heather, a diner worker whose werewolf form resembles a normal wolf
- Amandla Stenberg as Jonny, a figure skater and Heather's love interest
- Heidi von Palleske as Patti, the overbearing human mother of Heather
- Stephen McHattie as Henry, the overbearing werewolf father of Heather
- Cory Lipman as Rick, Jonny's less-pleasant boyfriend
- Charles F. Halpenny as Cooper, the younger brother of Heather
- Harrison W Halpenny as Hardy, the younger brother of Heather and the twin brother of Cooper
- Joe Apollonio as Otto, one of Jonny's friends
- Dean McDermott as Coach Dutch, a hockey coach
- Scott Thompson as Marcel
- Mitch Horowitz as a news reporter
- Graham Millions as slot machine player

== Production ==
In 2019, the project was selected to participate at the Frontières production market during the Fantasia International Film Festival.

Principal photography took place from February to March 2022 in Timmins, Ontario, Canada.

== Release ==
My Animal had its world premiere at the 2023 Sundance Film Festival on 22 January in the Midnight section. Prior to the premiere, the worldwide distribution, excluding Canada, was acquired by Paramount Global Content Distribution.

The film was released in select theaters on 8 September 2023, and on digital formats on 15 September.

== Reception ==
On the review aggregator website Rotten Tomatoes, 71% of 66 critics' reviews are positive. The website's consensus reads: "Jacqueline Castel's feature debut is an arresting queer and lycanthropic coming of age story that longs for more, but delivers just enough panache to satisfy."
