= The Breakup Girl =

- Film poster
- Directed by: Stacy Sherman
- Written by: Stacy Sherman
- Produced by: Jakki Fink; Billy Ray
- Starring: Shannon Woodward; Wendi McLendon-Covey; India Menuez; Joe Lo Truglio; Mary Kay Place; Ray Wise
- Cinematography: Chris Robertson
- Distributed by: Gravitas Ventures
- Release date: July 10, 2015
- Running time: 90 minutes
- Country: United States
- Language: English

The Breakup Girl is a 2015 American comedy-drama film, written and directed by Stacy Sherman, making it her feature film directing debut. The film stars Shannon Woodward, Wendi McLendon-Covey, India Menuez, Joe Lo Truglio, Mary Kay Place, and Ray Wise. The film is executive produced by The Hunger Games screenwriter Billy Ray. Film may also been referred to as its original working title Claire's Cambodia.

== Release ==
The film was released on iTunes and other Video on demand streaming services on July 10, 2015.

== Plot ==
This "sibling comedic drama" revolves around three estranged sisters whose resentment and envy of one another is barely dented by the news that their father (Ray Wise) is terminally ill. The three sisters are: Claire (Shannon Woodward) who is dumped by her boyfriend on her birthday; Sharon (Wendi McLendon-Covey), the oldest and seemingly most settled; and Kendra (India Menuez), the youngest and emotional one.

Sherman has said that the city of Los Angeles will be a major focus of the film, stating that the city's distinct neighborhood will characterize the sisters' differences. She stated: "Los Angeles will illustrate those divisions in a comedic way".

== Cast ==
- Shannon Woodward as Claire Baker
- Wendi McLendon-Covey as Sharon Baker
- India Menuez as Kendra Baker
- Joe Lo Truglio as Steve Baker
- Mary Kay Place as Joan Baker
- Ray Wise as Bob Baker
- Catherine Bach as Ellen
- Timm Sharp as Tim
- Nick Thune as Lewis
- Casey Wilson as Kate Lanley
- Samuel Larsen as Uri
- Natasha Leggero as Kim
