= Amandla Stenberg =

American actress (born 1998)

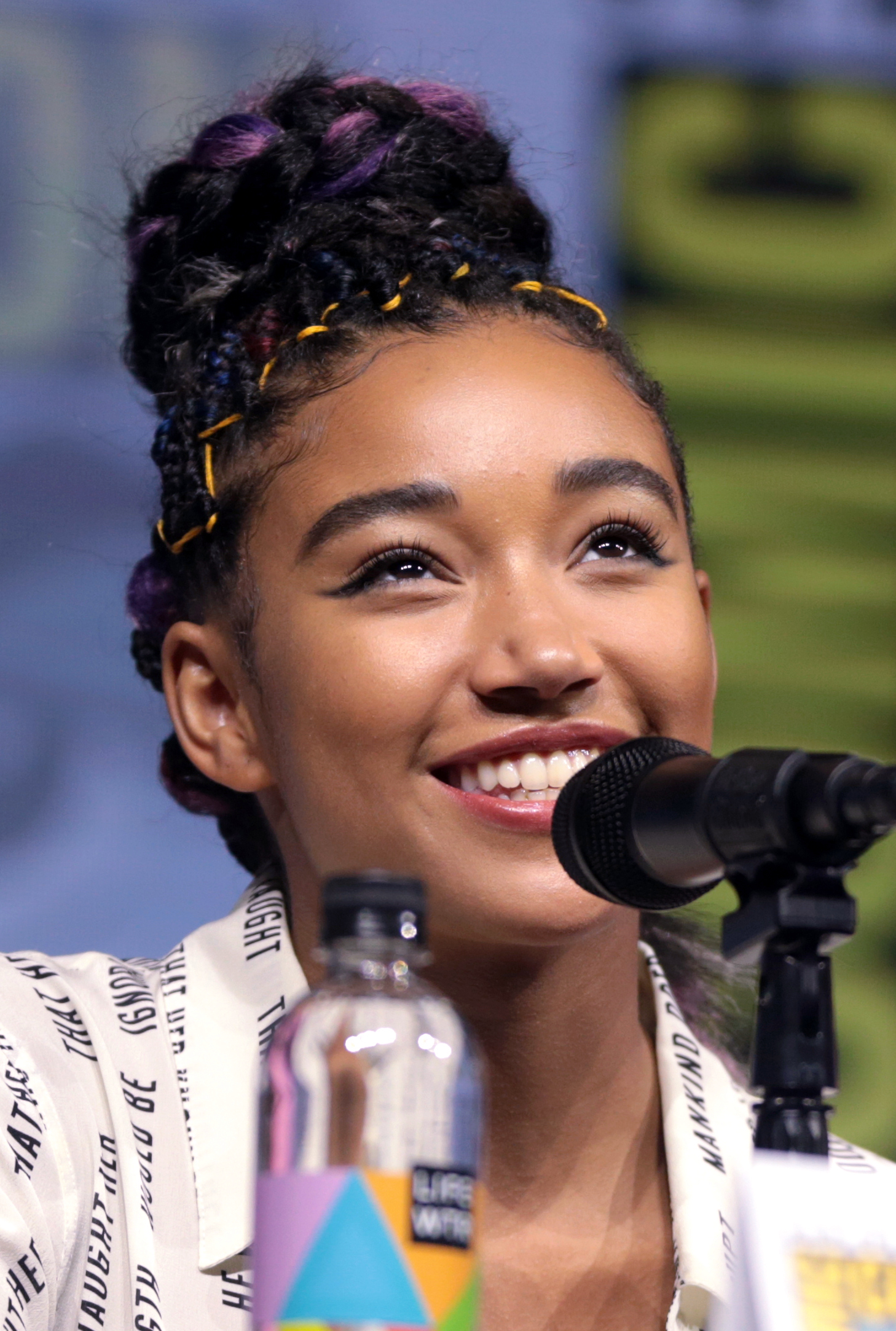
- Stenberg at the 2018 San Diego Comic-Con
- Born: October 23, 1998 (age 28); Los Angeles, California, U.S.
- Citizenship: United States; Denmark
- Occupations: Actress; musician
- Years active: 2011–present
- Musical career
- Genres: R&B; folk; neo soul
- Label: Sacred Bones
- Formerly of: Honey Water

Amandla Stenberg (born October 23, 1998) is an American actress and musician. She (Note: Stenberg uses both she/her and they/them pronouns. This article uses she/her for consistency.) began her career as a child actor and received recognition for playing Rue in the action film The Hunger Games (2012). As she grew older, she appeared in the supernatural series Sleepy Hollow (2013–2014) and the romance film Everything, Everything (2017). She received praise for her performance as a teenager witnessing a police shooting in the drama film The Hate U Give (2018). She has since starred in the comedy horror film Bodies Bodies Bodies (2022) and the Star Wars series The Acolyte (2024) in a dual role.

Outside of acting, Stenberg made her musical debut in 2015, performing as part of the folk rock duo Honeywater. Two years later, she performed the song "Let My Baby Stay" for Everything, Everything. She is also noted for her activism towards LGBTQ youth, and was included on Time's lists of most influential teens in 2015 and 2016.

== Early life ==
Amandla Stenberg, born in Los Angeles, California, is the child of Karen Brailsford, an African-American spiritual counselor and writer, and Tom Stenberg, who is Danish. Stenberg has two older half-sisters on her father's side. She has Greenlandic Inuit ancestry through her paternal grandmother, Ena Stenberg, who was born in Greenland and moved to Denmark during direct colonial rule of Greenland. She was a radio personality and singer in Denmark who performed with a group called Mik that sang at the World's Fair in New York in 1964. Ena Stenberg was associated with the Danish colonial community in Greenland before moving to Denmark.

Stenberg's first name means 'power' or 'strength' in the South African languages of Xhosa and Zulu. At age four, Stenberg started doing catalog modeling shoots for Disney. She has appeared in commercials for clients such as Boeing and Kmart.

In 2016, Stenberg announced via Instagram that she would be studying filmmaking at New York University Tisch School of the Arts. She ultimately decided against attending the school, as she found herself booking jobs, and instead chose to continue with her acting career.

== Career ==
=== 2011–2017: Early work ===
In 2011, she appeared in her first feature film, Colombiana, as a younger version of Zoe Saldaña's character. Her breakthrough came at the age of 12, when she was cast as Rue in the 2012 film The Hunger Games. The film was a critical and financial success, and Stenberg's performance was praised. She received a number of awards and nominations, including a Black Reel Award nomination. In 2013, she was cast in the short film Mercy playing the daughter of Robin Thicke and Paula Patton; Thicke directed the film. Stenberg had a recurring role on season one of Sleepy Hollow from 2013 to 2014.

In 2013, Stenberg began performing on the violin and singing harmonies at Los Angeles venues with singer-songwriter Zander Hawley. In 2014, Stenberg voiced Bia in the animated film Rio 2, which was a commercial success. She played series regular Halle Foster on the short-lived series Mr. Robinson, which ran in 2015.

In 2016, Stenberg appeared in Beyoncé: Lemonade by Beyoncé, and won the BET YoungStars Award. In the same year, she signed with The Society, a modelling agency. Also in 2016, Stenberg had auditioned for the role of Shuri in the superhero film Black Panther, however, she walked away because she felt that she was not right for the role. She told Variety magazine in 2018: "It was so exhilarating to see it fulfilled by people who should have been a part of it and who deserved it and who were right for it. I just wasn't." The role was instead given to actress Letitia Wright.

In 2017, she starred in the romantic drama Everything, Everything, directed by Stella Meghie, and co-starring Nick Robinson. She received praise for her performance, and earned a Teen Choice Award nomination.

=== 2018–present: Mainstream breakthrough ===
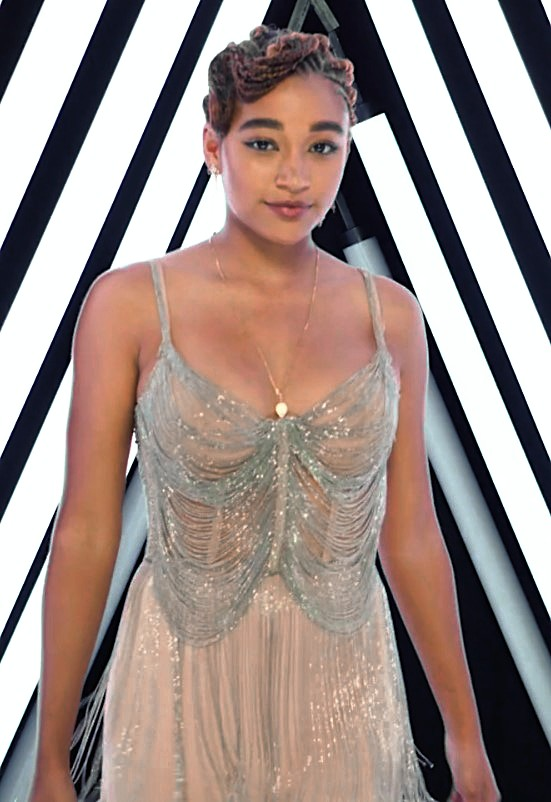
Stenberg at the Academy Awards in 2019

In 2018, she played the lead role of Starr Carter in the contemporary drama The Hate U Give, based on the novel of the same name, which is about the Black Lives Matter movement. The film was received positively, and Stenberg received critical acclaim for her performance. Peter Travers of Rolling Stone wrote: "It is impossible to over-praise Stenberg's incandescent performance, a gathering storm that grows in ferocity and feeling with each scene." The film's director, George Tillman Jr., said that "She has this ability to make you feel like you're seeing the real deal, which comes from a level of dedication to the material that's rare at any age." She earned several accolades for the role, which include winning an African-American Film Critics Association Award, an NAACP Image Award, and being nominated for a Critics' Choice Award and a Washington D.C. Area Film Critics Association Award. In late 2018, Stenberg starred in Amma Asante's World War II drama Where Hands Touch.

In 2019, Stenberg portrayed Elizabeth Eckford, a 15-year-old girl who in 1957 was among a group of nine Black students who were initially prevented from entering a racially segregated high school in Little Rock, Arkansas during a segment on the television show Drunk History (2019). In May 2019, she joined the cast of the Netflix miniseries The Eddy, which was released on May 8, 2020. That same month, she signed on to star in the remake of the 1996 thriller film Fear.

In August 2020, she was cast as Alana Beck in Stephen Chbosky's film adaptation of the Broadway musical Dear Evan Hansen. She also collaborated with the show's composers, Pasek and Paul, on "The Anonymous Ones", a new song written specifically for her character, whose role was expanded upon from the stage version.

In 2021, Stenberg was cast in the main role for the Star Wars series The Acolyte. She later shared via Instagram Stories that the cancellation of the show was "not a huge shock to [her]" due to the "hyper-conservative bigotry and vitriol, prejudice, hatred and hateful language" it received from Star Wars fans.

In 2022, Stenberg was part of the ensemble cast of the comedy horror film Bodies Bodies Bodies (2022). Bodies Bodies Bodies premiered at South by Southwest on March 14, 2022. It was theatrically released by A24 on August 5, 2022, in select cities, before a nationwide expansion on August 12.

In May 2023, Stenberg was announced as part of the voice cast of Spider-Man: Across the Spider-Verse as Margo Kess / Spider-Byte. Stenberg also starred opposite Bobbi Salvör Menuez in the queer horror film My Animal, which had its world premiere at the 2023 Sundance Film Festival in January.

== Other ventures ==
=== Activism ===
Stenberg has described herself as an intersectional feminist. She is outspoken about her political views in interviews and on social media and was named "Feminist of the Year" in 2015 by the Ms. Foundation for Women. She has spoken publicly on social media about cultural appropriation. Her video "Don't Cash Crop My Cornrows" admonished Kylie Jenner for adopting the traditionally African-American hairstyle. In April 2016, Stenberg gave a speech at WE Day California, a WE Charity event.

In October 2023, Stenberg signed the Artists4Ceasefire open letter to Joe Biden, President of the United States, calling for a ceasefire of the Israeli bombardment of Gaza and Gaza war.

=== Music ===
In 2015, Stenberg released her first EP in August 2015 as the folk rock duo Honeywater. Also in 2015, she released the video "Don't Cash Crop My Cornrows", which admonished Kylie Jenner for adopting the traditionally African-American hairstyle. In 2017, she performed "Let My Baby Stay" for the soundtrack for Everything, Everything.

On June 19, 2024, Stenberg released "Discourse", a song that was created to address the racial prejudice she has endured. The track references a viral 2018 interview she had with The Daily Show's Trevor Noah, in which Stenberg raps "white people crying actually was the goal" of The Hate U Give, a film she stars in about the aftermath of a Black teenager's murder by a police officer.

=== Writing ===
Stenberg co-wrote the comic book Niobe: She is Life with Sebastian Jones, which was illustrated by Ashley A. Woods, and published in November 2015. It is the first nationally distributed comic that has a black woman as its protagonist, author, and another as the artist. In 2017, Stenberg and Sebastian Jones released Niobe: She is Death, the second part of the trilogy.

== Media image ==
Dazed magazine named Stenberg "one of the most incendiary voices of her generation" when it featured her on its Autumn 2015 cover. She was included in Time's list of Most Influential Teens in 2015 and again in 2016. In 2016, she was included in the SuperSoul 100 list of visionaries and influential leaders by Oprah Winfrey.

== Personal life ==
In January 2016, Stenberg came out as bisexual, though she subsequently stated that pansexual was an accurate term as well. That March, Stenberg came out as non-binary, and has since used both she/her and they/them pronouns. In June 2018, in an interview with Wonderland magazine, she came out as gay.

In a July 2017 interview, Stenberg said she had stopped using a smartphone, believing that such devices and social media can have a negative effect on mental health.

On October 6, 2018, Teen Vogue published an op-ed Stenberg had written for the magazine, in which she shared that she experienced two separate counts of sexual assault.

From early 2018 to late 2018, Stenberg dated singer Mikaela Mullaney Straus, better known by her stage name King Princess. From 2018 to 2020, she was in a relationship with singer-songwriter Lindsey Jordan.

During 2020, Stenberg lived in Copenhagen for three months in order to retain her Danish citizenship.

== Filmography ==
Key
†	Denotes works that have not yet been released

=== Film ===
Year	Title	Role	Notes	Ref.
2011	Colombiana	Young Cataleya Restrepo		
2012	The Hunger Games	Rue		
2013	Mercy	Sarah	Short film	
2014	Rio 2	Bia	Voice	
2016	As You Are	Sarah		
2017	Everything, Everything	Maddy Whittier		
2018	The Darkest Minds	Ruby Daly		
2018	The Hate U Give	Starr Carter		
2018	Where Hands Touch	Leyna		
2021	Dear Evan Hansen	Alana Beck		
2022	Bodies Bodies Bodies	Sophie	Also executive producer	
2023	My Animal	Jonny	Also executive producer	
2023	Spider-Man: Across the Spider-Verse	Margo Kess / Spider-Byte	Voice	
2023	Ozi: Voice of the Forest	Ozi	Voice	
2026	Wildwood	Niamh	Voice	
2027	Children of Blood and Bone †	Princess Amari	Post-production	

=== Television ===
Year	Title	Role	Notes	Ref.
2012	A Taste of Romance	Taylor	Television film	
2013–2014	Sleepy Hollow	Macey Irving	Recurring role; 4 episodes	
2015	Mr. Robinson	Halle Foster	Main role	
2017	Neo Yokio	Helenist	Episode: "O, the Helenists..."	
2019	Drunk History	Elizabeth Eckford	Episode: "Trailblazers"	
2019	Gaslight	Sarah	Voice role; 9 episodes	
2020	The Eddy	Julie Udo	Main role	
2022	Ziwe	Penny	Episode: "Critical Race Theory"	
2023	RuPaul's Drag Race	Herself/Guest Judge	Episode: "Supersized Snatch Game"	
2023	RuPaul's Drag Race: Untucked	Herself	Episode: "Untucked - Supersized Snatch Game"	
2024	The Acolyte	Verosha "Osha" Aniseya / Mae-ho "Mae" Aniseya	Main dual roles	

=== Music videos ===
Year	Title	Artist(s)	Role	Ref.
2016	"Lemonade"	Beyoncé	Herself	

== Awards and nominations ==
Stenberg is most acclaimed for her performance in The Hate U Give (2018). For The Hate U Give, she earned numerous accolades in the Best Actress and Best Breakthrough Performance categories, winning an African-American Film Critics Association Award, a Hollywood Film Award, an NAACP Image Award, and earning nominations for a Critics' Choice Award, a MTV Movie & TV Award, a Teen Choice Award, and a Washington D.C. Area Film Critics Association Award.

Stenberg's first nominations were for The Hunger Games (2012), and her first win was the BET YoungStars Award at the age of 17. She received nominations for her performance as an ill teenager in the drama film Everything, Everything (2017).
