= One for Sorrow (Barzak novel) =

Book by Christopher Barzak

- First edition
- Author: Christopher Barzak
- Language: English
- Genre: Novel
- Publisher: Bantam Books
- Publication date: 2007
- Publication place: United States
- Media type: Print (Paperback)
- Pages: 320
- ISBN: 978-0-553-38436-9
- OCLC: 123350080
- Followed by: The Love We Share Without Knowing

One for Sorrow is a coming-of-age novel by the American writer Christopher Barzak. In 2014 it was adapted into the feature film Jamie Marks is Dead and debuted at the Sundance Film Festival. Directed by Carter Smith, the film's actors include Liv Tyler, Judy Greer, Cameron Monaghan, Morgan Saylor, Noah Silver, and Madisen Beaty.

== Plot and style ==
The novel tells the story of Adam McCormick and Gracie Highsmith, and their relationship to Jamie Marks, a boy found in the woods, supposedly murdered. It does not follow the traditional suspense or mystery novel's convention of tracking down the murderer. Instead, the book explores the nature of relationships between young adults and their families, communities (a somewhat hard-scrabble rural working class small town outside of Youngstown, Ohio), and the search for hope or redemption. Adam and Jamie's relationship has several homoerotic elements that could argue that Adam is bisexual.

The novel makes use of fantastical elements (in this case, ghosts) situated in a mostly realistic, recognizable setting.

== Reception ==
One for Sorrow won the Crawford Award for Best First Fantasy in 2008. It was also nominated for the Great Lakes Book Award, The Logo Channel's New Now Next Award, and The Locus Award for Best First Novel. The novel was praised as "lovely, melancholy, offbeat" in a Village Voice review of 2007. The Washington Post called One for Sorrow a "remarkable first novel."
