= Bobbi Salvör Menuez =

American actor and model

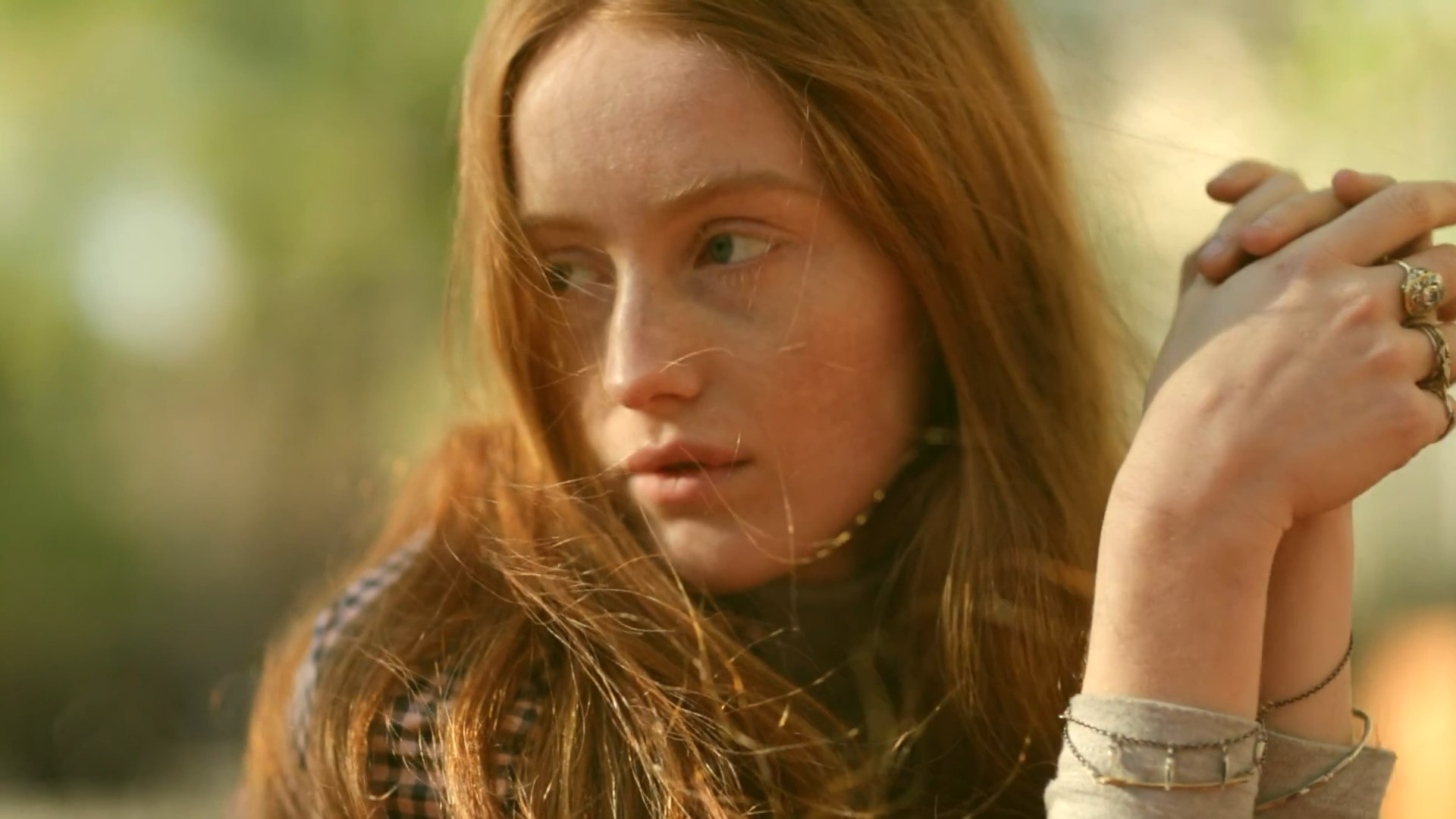
- Menuez in 2016
- Born: India Salvör Menuez; 1993 (age 32–33); Brooklyn, New York, United States
- Occupations: Actor; model

Bobbi Salvör Menuez (born 1993) is an American actor and model. They have appeared in films including Something in the Air, The Breakup Girl, and White Girl, and in the Amazon Prime Video series I Love Dick. They have been a curator at MoMA PS1.

== Early life ==
Menuez was born in Park Slope, New York City in 1993. They founded the Luck You artist collective in high school.

== Career ==
Menuez starred in a fashion editorial for Harper's Bazaar in 2014. The same year, they acted in the film Uncertain Terms.

In 2016, Menuez acted in the film White Girl, three episodes of Transparent, and in a recurring role on I Love Dick. They also modeled for Miu Miu and New York Fashion Week and organized a performance art project at the MoMA PS1.

In 2019, they played Gillian in the comedy drama film Adam. They also acted in one episode of Euphoria.

Menuez played the primary roles in the music videos for two Leonard Cohen songs published after his death. In "Happens to the Heart" (2019), Menuez walks through a forest while dressed like Cohen, eventually putting on the clothes of a Zen monk and meditating. In "Puppets" (2021), Menuez walks down a city street dressed like Cohen, eventually setting themselves on fire.

In 2023, they co-starred with Amandla Stenberg in Jacqueline Castel's My Animal, which had its world premiere at the 2023 Sundance Film Festival, on January 22, 2023, in the Midnight section.

== Personal life ==
In January 2019, they announced on social media that they would be using the name Bobbi, a name they had been using privately for over a year prior to the announcement. Menuez is queer, trans, and non-binary, and uses they/them pronouns. They married artist Quori Theodor in 2024.

== Filmography ==
=== Film ===
Year	Title	Role	Notes
2012	Something in the Air	Leslie	
2014	Uncertain Terms	Nina	
2014	Mall	Adelle	
2015	Family Tree	River	Short film
2015	Self Aware	River	Short film
2015	I Remember Nothing	Joan	Short film
2015	The Breakup Girl	Kendra Baker	
2016	White Girl	Katie	Credited as India Menuez
2016	My First Kiss and the People Involved	Sam	
2016	Nocturnal Animals	Samantha Morrow	
2016	Eugenia and John	Ana	
2017	Landline	Sophie	
2017	Cheer Up Baby	Anna	Short film
2018	Caprice	India	
2018	Under the Silver Lake	Shooting Star #1	Credited as India Menuez
2019	Adam	Gillian	
2019	Grind Reset Shine	India	
2020	Under My Skin	Denny	
2023	My Animal	Heather	Also executive producer

=== Television ===
Year	Title	Role	Notes
2015	Girls		Episode: "Female Author"
2015	Transparent	Bella	3 episodes
2016–2017	I Love Dick	Toby	8 episodes
2019	Euphoria	TC	Episode: "The Trials and Tribulations of Trying to Pee While Depressed"
2026	Landman	Paigyn	Episode: "Plans, Tears And Sirens"
