= Being Charlie =

2015 American drama film by Rob Reiner

- Theatrical release poster
- Directed by: Rob Reiner
- Screenplay by: Nick Reiner; Matt Elisofon
- Produced by: Stephanie Rennie; Simon Goldberg; Rob Reiner; Johnson Chan
- Starring: Nick Robinson; Morgan Saylor; Devon Bostick; Susan Misner; Ricardo Chavira; Common; Cary Elwes
- Cinematography: Barry Markowitz
- Edited by: Bob Joyce
- Music by: Chris Bacon
- Production companies: Jorva Entertainment Productions; Defiant Pictures; Castle Rock Entertainment
- Distributed by: Paladin
- Release dates: September 14, 2015 (TIFF); May 6, 2016 (United States)
- Running time: 97 minutes
- Country: United States
- Language: English
- Budget: $2–3 million
- Box office: $32,964

Being Charlie is a 2015 American drama film directed by Rob Reiner and co-written by his son, Nick Reiner, alongside Matt Elisofon. The film stars Nick Robinson, Common, Cary Elwes, Devon Bostick, Morgan Saylor, Susan Misner, and Ricardo Chavira.

The film is based on Nick Reiner's experiences following his heroin addiction and homelessness. It was screened in the Special Presentations section of the 2015 Toronto International Film Festival on September 14, 2015. The film was released on May 6, 2016, by Paladin in the United States to negative reviews from critics.

The film gained renewed attention following Nick Reiner's alleged murder of his father and mother, Michele Reiner.

== Plot ==
Charlie is a troubled addict who has been in and out of rehab for years. On his 18th birthday he walks out of a youth rehab facility in rural Utah, and throws a rock through a stained glass window of the facility's chapel. Hitchhiking, Charlie is picked up by a man and his sick mother. The man agrees to drop him at a bus station after taking her home. However, when he discovers Charlie has stolen his mother's oxy cancer painkillers, he throws him out of his truck. Charlie calls Adam, his best friend and dealer, to come pick him up. When he arrives home to Los Angeles, his parents stage an intervention.

Given the choice between another try at rehab or going to jail in Utah for damaging the stained glass, Charlie reluctantly chooses the adult rehab. In the program, Charlie meets Eva, who becomes an enabler of his drug problems.

His time at the inpatient facility moves by quickly with a routine: group meetings, yoga sessions, visits from family members, and contributing in group therapy. When Charlie moves to an outpatient house, the routine continues, albeit with some freedom. The head of the house tries to explain to Charlie the problem with having a romance during recovery, claiming that recovery has to be selfish, because addiction is selfish, and warns that Charlie's relationship with Eva might not work out. Charlie's mother gives him blunt advice and compassionate support, while the relationship with his father, David, is more strained. David is a former actor running for governor, who struggles with the negative press from his son's troubles.

After Charlie and Eva spend their weekend pass together, when he brings up the topic of love, she becomes distant. Eva tells Charlie that the program is not working, but he believes it is working because they have each other. She realizes he doesn't understand her, and without warning, Eva leaves. Charlie leaves the outpatient home to find her, taking his mother's vehicle for the search, and he finds her at Venice Beach. He declares he loves her, embracing her, but she seems vacant. He takes her to his beach house, and though Eva falls asleep in his arms, by morning she is gone.

Outside of the program, Charlie relapses. He is on the streets for close to two weeks when he is robbed. Broke, he seeks help from his friend Adam. They party together, and Adam overdoses and dies. Charlie is taken into custody but exonerated, though it makes the news. The next day is the election for David. Believing that it is unlikely that he will win his gubernatorial run, David accompanies his inebriated wife to rest, when an aide informs him of his victory. He accepts his win alone.

The next day, David looks for Charlie. They make peace, and Charlie plans to head out into the world, pursuing standup comedy.

== Cast ==
- Nick Robinson as Charlie Mills
- Common as Travis
- Cary Elwes as David Mills
- Devon Bostick as Adam
- Morgan Saylor as Eva
- Susan Misner as Liseanne Mills
- Ricardo Chavira as Drake
- Jake Reiner as Edward Barnes

== Production ==
On April 22, 2015, it was announced Nick Robinson, Morgan Saylor, Common, Devon Bostick, Susan Misner, Ricardo Chavira and Cary Elwes would star in the film. Principal photography began in April 2015, and ended on May 7, 2015. The film is loosely based on Reiner's son Nick and his struggles with addiction and homelessness.

== Release ==
The film premiered at the 2015 Toronto International Film Festival on September 14, 2015. The film was released on May 6, 2016, by Paladin.

== Reception ==
Being Charlie received negative reviews from critics. On Rotten Tomatoes, the film has a rating of 24%, based on 42 reviews. The website's critics consensus reads, "Being Charlie has wonderful intentions and a strong central performance, but an affecting true story gets lost in the script's surfeit of clichés." On Metacritic, the film has a score of 47 out of 100, based on 18 critics, indicating "mixed or average" reviews.

On December 14, 2025, Nick Reiner was arrested for allegedly murdering his parents, Rob and Michele Reiner. This brought renewed attention to the film and its press tour, where Nick and Rob spoke about their relationship and time working together on the film. Despite the relationship Nick and his father tried to build after making Being Charlie, police would nevertheless still visit Rob Reiner's home on many occasions over the next decade due to incidents involving Nick.
