= White Girl (2016 film) =

- Theatrical release poster
- Directed by: Elizabeth Wood
- Written by: Elizabeth Wood
- Produced by: Gabriel Nussbaum
- Starring: Morgan Saylor; Brian Marc; India Menuez; Adrian Martinez; Anthony Ramos; Ralph Rodriguez; Annabelle Dexter-Jones; Chris Noth; Justin Bartha
- Cinematography: Michael Simmonds
- Edited by: Michael Taylor
- Production companies: Bank Street Films; Killer Films; Supermarche; Greencard Pictures
- Distributed by: Netflix; FilmRise
- Release dates: January 23, 2016 (Sundance Film Festival); September 2, 2016 (United States)
- Running time: 88 minutes
- Country: United States
- Language: English
- Budget: $700,000
- Box office: $200,242

White Girl is a 2016 American drama film written and directed by Elizabeth Wood in her directorial debut. It stars Morgan Saylor, Brian Marc, India Menuez, Adrian Martinez, Anthony Ramos (in his film acting debut), Ralph Rodriguez, Annabelle Dexter-Jones, Chris Noth and Justin Bartha.

The film had its world premiere at the Sundance Film Festival on January 23, 2016. It was acquired by Netflix for worldwide streaming video on demand, and was released in select American theaters nationwide on September 2, 2016, by FilmRise.

== Plot ==
Leah, a student about to enter her second year of college, moves in with her friend Katie into an apartment in Ridgewood, Queens. One night, out of marijuana, she asks a group of young Latino men on her corner to sell her drugs. They refuse. After a few days, Leah runs into Blue in a liquor/ convenience store and invites him into her apartment. He explains that, while he is a dealer, he doesn't do hard drugs. They end up having sex on her roof.

Leah tells him he could be making $60 compared to the $20 he has been selling them for. She invites him to a party thrown by her magazine, where she interns, and Blue is able to mark up his prices to the crowd.

Emboldened by his success, Blue asks for a kilo of cocaine from his supplier Lloyd. He agrees and Blue and Leah go to a restaurant for breakfast. While there, he is approached by one of his regulars, who sets him up, and he is immediately arrested by an undercover police officer. Leah picks up the kilo and quietly leaves.

Leah goes to visit Blue in jail and he tells her he may get 20 years in prison due to priors. She decides to help him, telling him that she has the coke, so the police have no evidence. He asks her to return it to Lloyd and explain. As she approaches Lloyd's, she recognizes the same undercover cop right outside, and decides to run. She then finds Blue a lawyer named George, intending to deal the coke to pay his fee. He is optimistic that they have a very good case.

Approaching her boss, Kelly, Leah sells a third of the kilo. Katie and Blue's friends help move the rest, while Blue believes George is representing him pro bono. As her debts pile up, Lloyd finds her, pressuring her for the rest of the money, so she asks Kelly for a $17,000 loan. He instead helps her throw a rave with a cover charge. The party is a success, but Leah takes too many drugs and wakes up alone with no money.

Leah promises George she will get the rest of the money, but he tells her to forget it. He takes her to dinner, explaining that the legal system is unequal and white men who commit violent crimes are more likely to get off for their crimes than non-violent PoC offenders like Blue. The two end up going to Leah's where she passes out, intoxicated. George uses the opportunity to rape her.

Afterwards, Leah becomes silent and withdrawn, staying in bed. She is surprised one day by Blue who arrives in her apartment and crawls into bed with her. He reveals that the lawyer managed to free him and credits Leah with saving his life. Getting on one knee he proposes to her, to which she does not give a clear answer. (However, in the next scene they are happily kissing each other.)

Walking down the street together, Leah and Blue are surprised when Lloyd attacks them both, wanting his money. Blue first hits him over the head with a broken bottle then beats him to death with a wrench. As Leah looks on, Blue silently realizes she caused the attack by not returning the coke.

Blue is arrested, watching Leah coldly as he is driven away. Leah is last seen in a classroom, just before the credits.

== Cast ==
- Morgan Saylor as Leah
- Brian Marc as Blue
- Justin Bartha as Kelly
- Chris Noth as George
- India Menuez as Katie
- Adrian Martinez as Lloyd
- Anthony Ramos as Kilo
- Ralph Rodriguez as Nene
- Annabelle Dexter-Jones as Alexa
- Jemel Howard as Darnell

== Production ==
In February 2015, it was revealed that Elizabeth Wood had directed a film from a screenplay she wrote, with Morgan Saylor and India Menuez starring in the film. Gabriel Nussbaum produced the film for Bank Street Films, while Christine Vachon, Henry Joost and Ariel Schulman executive produced the film under their Killer Films and Supermarche banners respectively. Wood began writing the feature before attending Columbia University's screenwriting MFA program. She loosely based the film on her own life.

== Release ==
The film had its world premiere at the 2016 Sundance Film Festival on January 23, 2016. Shortly after, Netflix acquired worldwide video on demand distribution rights to the film for a seven figure price. In April 2016, FilmRise acquired theatrical distribution rights to the film with a planned late summer-fall 2016 release. The film was released on September 2, 2016. It was released on Netflix on December 2, 2016.

== Reception ==
White Girl received positive reviews from film critics. It holds a 70% approval rating on review aggregator website Rotten Tomatoes, based on 50 reviews. The site's consensus states: "White Girl isn't an easy watch, but it adroitly walks the line between exploitation and drama - and marks an admirably assured debut for writer-director Elizabeth Wood". On Metacritic, the film holds a rating of 65 out of 100, based on 23 critics, indicating "generally favorable reviews".

Writing in the New York Times, Stephen Holden designated the film an "NYT Critic's Pick" stating that "we’re all familiar with the term contact high, but not with its antithesis. Because it is so believable, “White Girl” is a contact bummer that’s hard to shake." Holden also made reference to "obligatory tut-tutting from nervous male critics."

Vogue mentioned that "It won’t be news to anyone that young, middle-class white girls enjoy countless privileges unavailable to poor Puerto Rican boys, nor that middle-aged, well-educated white men—like Kelly, like Blue’s lawyer—are the most privileged of all. But to see it dramatized, and in such raw, unremittingly cynical, outrageously graphic detail, is still a disturbing shock to the system."

Vice praised the film as "the most explosive portrait of NYC youth since Kids" while Peter Debruge ofVariety gave the film a scandalized review, bemoaning that the film "plung[es] our faces into a cesspool of reprehensible behavior Debruge himself introduced director Elizabeth Wood as one of "Variety's Ten Directors to Watch" at the Palm Springs International Film Festival.

Leslie Feleprin in The Hollywood Reporter praised the film as "squalid, shocking, and sexy as hell" and addressed the critical controversy, stating that "after the screening I attended, an indignant fellow journalist argued that if it had been made by a man it would be vilified for its misogyny... Misogyny, unfortunately, is not something that can be objectively measured in a work of art. It’s something viewers also feel in their gut, and I don’t feel the film is misogynist at all — not because being a woman myself necessarily gives me the right to make that call. To me it seemed like a brutally honest depiction of how easy it is for a young woman (or any young person really), especially one already inclined toward hedonism and rebellion, to confuse adventure with danger, and end up exposing herself to violence and abusive situations when she thought she was just having fun."

IndieWire's David Ehrlich wrote that "Elizabeth Wood’s fire-breathing debut is an adrenalized shot of ecstasy and entitlement, a fully committed cautionary tale that’s able to follow through on its premise because — like the remarkable young actress who plays its heroine — the film is unafraid of being utterly loathsome."

The film received significant media attention for its commentary on issues of sex and race, including an essay by Anna Silman in New York Magazine entitled If You Think White Girl’s Sex Scenes Are Shocking, You’re Missing the Point. Silman writes "White Girl is the rare film, written and directed by a woman, that shows a young woman’s sex life in its many shades, which acknowledges that sexual agency can be both a blessing and curse. Sex gives Leah pleasure, and it also serves as a bargaining chip in desperate times. It’s given with love and affection, as in her nascent relationship with Blue, and it is forced upon her, in a horrific rape scene near the end of the film. After her first sexual encounter with Kelly, she continues to hook up with him; sometimes because she needs his help, but also at times because she seems to enjoy it. These dynamics are complicated, and complexity can be hard to reckon with. It’s much easier to dismiss them as cheap sensationalism."

Anne Helen Peterson wrote an essay titled How A Movie Filled With Coke And Dicks Explodes White Privilege in which she deems the movie "a trenchant critique of the privilege afforded young, beautiful, white women, and the wreckage they can leave behind."
