= Neil Nathan =

American singer songwriter

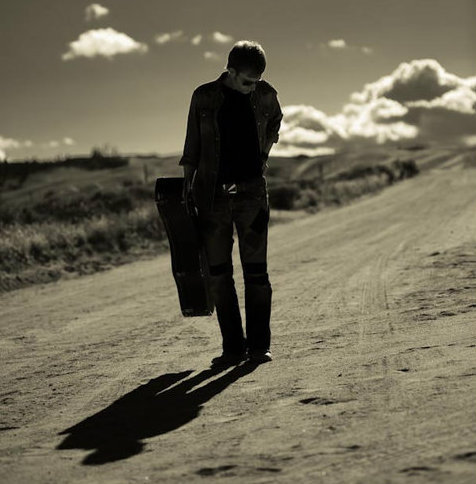

Background information
- Born: New Brunswick, New Jersey, United States
- Genres: Rock, Americana, folk, alt country, garage rock
- Instruments: Singer/songwriter, guitar
- Years active: 2007 – present
- Website: www.neilnathan.com

Neil Nathan is an American rock/folk/alt country singer songwriter from New York City. Neil is best known for his folky cover of ELO and The Move's "Do Ya," featured on the Californication Season 2 Soundtrack. Praised by U.K.’s No Ripcord Magazine, as “the bastard stepchild of Jackson Browne & David Bowie,” Neil Nathan's wide range of all star collaborators include members of The Raconteurs, Elle King, St. Vincent, Midlake, Jason Molina, and Wild Pink.

== Biography ==
Neil Nathan was born in New Brunswick, New Jersey and raised in New City, New York. Nathan graduated from Cornell University with a degree in Economics and soon after moved to New York City, where he simultaneously began his careers as a rock singer and high school teacher. Nathan taught in schools that were consistently rated among the city's most dangerous; Theodore Roosevelt High School in the Bronx, and Martin Luther King, Jr. High School in Manhattan. (While at the latter, Neil directed a nationally renowned arts education program and was featured on the cover of American Teacher Magazine.)

Nathan fronted the power pop rock band, THIS, featuring drummer Jonathon Tebeest (from the band Rasputina). Their final EP was produced by Barrett Jones (who has also worked with the Foo Fighters, Nirvana, Melvins).

Nathan co-produced and starred in the Off-Broadway Rock Opera, Automatic Superstar, written by Bob Weidman. It was described as a "glam punk manifesto like Ziggy Stardust or The Wall" by the Daily News. Barrett Jones mixed the show EP, entitled Matic, after Nathan's mirror ball-masked rock star.

Nathan's first solo composition was written after the death of his close high school and college friend, Fred Gabler, who worked for Cantor Fitzgerald and died in the World Trade Center on September 11, 2001. Neil wrote Freddy's Song to "memorialize his life" and sang it at his funeral a few months later. Nathan also held a fundraiser at the Lower East Side's Living Room where he sold copies of the song to raise money for the Fred Gabler Helping Hand Camp Fund (a charity that sends underprivileged youth to sleep-away camp). Neil continued to raise money for the fund in Christmas 2009, with a darkly comic video for his cover of Santa Claus Is Coming To Town, and most recently with his 9/11 20th Anniversary Tribute Single, The Guardrail.

Nathan recorded three EPs from 2007–2008 (Glide, Songsmiths, and the Nearest Future) and one single (Motor City Recordings). His Glide EP, co-produced with David Seitz ( Pete Seeger, Bruce Springsteen, Dar Williams) includes the songs, "The Lucky Ones", and "Glide." These songs were both featured in the film "Descent", starring Rosario Dawson (who was Neil Nathan's roommate in the East Village) and written and directed by Talia Lugacy. Talia directed the video for Neil's song, "3 Seconds," also featured on the Glide EP. Neil's song, Gone (Fly Away), was also featured in the film and on his single Motor City Recordings.

Nathan completed 'Motor City Recordings' in Detroit with producer Bobby Harlow, (from The Go), with a more 'garage rock' sound. The two enjoyed working together and planned on doing a full album a year later, which became Nathan's debut LP, The Distance Calls. In the meantime, he recorded an EP of covers called 'Songsmiths' produced by lap-steel guitarist Mike "Slo-Mo" Brenner ( Marah, Jason Molina, Wild Pink). This 6-song EP featured a cover of Chris Malcarney of The Donuts' country ballad "Mia", ELO and The Move's "Do Ya," Small Faces "All or Nothing", Jesse Hartman's/Laptop's "I'm So Happy You Failed," and a cover of Beethoven's "Fur Elise" title Darling Friend. Vaj Potenza (My Brightest Diamond's Freak Out Gold Chains Remix) directed the video for it. The last track on 'Songsmiths,' "Old Man Time," was co-written by Brenner and Nathan for Descent but it was not used in the film. Do Ya was featured on Showtime's Californication Soundtrack.

In the spring of 2008, Nathan reconvened with Bobby Harlow and recorded his debut album, 'The Distance Calls,' at Tempermill Studios in Detroit. The album features many prominent rock musicians from Detroit, including Dean Fertita (The Raconteurs, Queens of the Stone Age), Kenny Tudrick (Kid Rock, Detroit Cobras), Joey Mazzola (Detroit Cobras, Sponge), John Krautner (The Go), and Danny Methric (The Paybacks, The Muggs). It was engineered and mastered by Jim Kissling.

In 2010, Pete Sinjin released his Better Angels Radio LP on Nathan's Pirate Vinyl imprint. It peaked at No. 10 on the EuroAmericana Charts. The album was co-produced by Mike Davis and Riley McMahon at McMahon's New Warsaw Studios in Brooklyn. Nathan and McMahon then went on to co-produce three debut EP's at New Warsaw in 2011: Caren Le Vine's Ride, Susannah Conn's Hidden Treasure, and Active Bird Community (Barsuk Records)/Home School lead singer, Tom D'Agustino's debut solo EP, Engines. All were released on the Pirate Vinyl imprint.

Neil and Riley loved the band they put together for Engines and used them as the backing band for Neil Nathan Inc.'s raucous power to the people concept LP, Sweep The Nation. Magnet Magazine and The Vinyl District both called the record "Impressive." Huffington Post featured the claymation video for the debut single Jumpstart, calling it "a bizarre good time." The record was released in December 2012.

Nathan returned to his mellower, ethereal sound on his Flowers on the Moon LP, released in April 2017. On it, he covers Rodriguez's "Sugar Man." Stephen "Sugar" Segerman, author of Sugar Man, The Birth, Death, and Resurrection of Sixto Rodriguez, and subject of the Oscar winning documentary "Searching for Sugar Man," is quoted as loving Neil's trippy version.

In 2020, Downtown Music Publishing asked Neil to record covers of some of the well known songs they administer. Neil recorded and released two versions of John Lennon's Power To The People and Lennon/McCartney's "Love Me Do". The songs were produced and recorded by Joey McClellan and Mckenzie Smith of Midlake.

Neil is currently releasing material he recorded in Philadelphia with co-producer Mike "Slo-Mo" Brenner and recording engineer Peter Rydberg at Studio 1935 and with his Brazilian collaborator/co-producer Thales Posella.

== Discography ==
- Glide (EP) (2007)
- Motor City Recordings (A/B Side) (2007)
- Songsmiths (EP) (2008)
- The Nearest Future (EP) (2009)
- Santa Claus Is Coming To Town (Single) (2009)
- The Distance Calls (LP) (2010)
- To You (A Happy Birthday Song) (A/B Side) (2011)
- Neil Nathan Inc's Sweep The Nation (LP) (2012)
- Flowers on the Moon (LP) (2017)
- Power To The People (Single) (2020)
- Promised Land (Single) (2020)
- "Love Me Do" (Single) (2020)
- Some Humans Ain't Human (Single) (2020)
- When You Love Somebody (Single) (2020)
- Don't Walk Away Again (Single) (2020)
- Election Day (Single) (2020)
- Please Be Well (Single) (2020)
- If You Wanna Know (Single) (2021)
- Power To The People (Soul Power Version) (Single) (2021)
- You're My Lady (Single) (2021)
- All Together (Single) (2021)
- The Guardrail (Single) (2021)
- The Folly of War (Single) (2021)
- Be Still My Ever Beaten Heart (Single) (2021)
