= Krystal (film) =

- Theatrical release poster
- Directed by: William H. Macy
- Written by: Will Aldis
- Produced by: Dan Keston; Rachel Winter
- Starring: Rosario Dawson; Nick Robinson; T.I.; Grant Gustin; Felicity Huffman; William H. Macy; Jacob Latimore; Rick Fox; William Fichtner; Kathy Bates
- Cinematography: Adam Silver
- Edited by: Ben Baudhuin
- Music by: Dan Romer
- Production company: Dorian Media
- Distributed by: Great Point Media; Paladin
- Release dates: November 10, 2017 (VFF); April 13, 2018 (United States)
- Running time: 93 minutes
- Country: United States
- Language: English
- Box office: $37,516

Krystal is a 2017 American coming-of-age comedy-drama film directed by William H. Macy and written by Will Aldis. The film stars Rosario Dawson, Nick Robinson, T.I., Grant Gustin, Felicity Huffman, Macy, Jacob Latimore, Rick Fox, William Fichtner, and Kathy Bates.

The film had its world premiere at the Virginia Film Festival on November 10, 2017. It was released on April 13, 2018, by Great Point Media and Paladin.

== Plot ==
Taylor Ogburn is an 18-year-old who suffers from PAT, a type of arrhythmia. Living in the South, his family is all creative: his brother Campbell is an artist, his father Wyatt a writer, and his mother Poppy a poet.

In a flashback, Taylor is shown as a young boy when he has his first PAT attack. He was running with his dog when a man hit him with his car. He laid down next to him on the road.

Taylor's second incident occurred when he saw a cartoon of a devil figure in a girlie magazine, who looked like the man who hit his dog. He had a panic attack, running through the house, screaming that the devil was in the attic. Taylor's dad rationalized the attack, pushing the idea from one of his books, discussing the redemptive power of prayer and meditation. From that moment on, Taylor is sheltered from anything that could trigger an attack. He isn't to go to college, as there would be too many potential triggers.

On the beach, a beautiful 30+-year-old asks Taylor for help getting a ride, and his sudden surge in feelings triggers an attack. Krystal accompanies him to the hospital, and he won't let go of her hand. Being in the hospital makes her light-headed, so she passes out.

The next day, in Campbell's studio, they talk about their beliefs in love, god, and satan. None of which his brother believes in. Then, at work at the art gallery, he asks Vera about love. She tells him he'll know one day, then leaves for her AA meeting.

Left in charge, upon seeing Krystal from afar, Taylor closes up shop to follow her. He wanders into her and Vera's AA meeting. Krystal is the main speaker, so she describes herself as an "ex-hooker-stripper-junkie-alcoholic". Approaching her after, she turns down Taylor's invite for a coffee. She sees he looks light-headed again, which he denies. Afterwards, he determines he has fallen in love with her.

At a family meeting, after his mother recites a new poem, he declares his feelings for Krystal. Hearing about her background, they disapprove. Campbell gives Taylor his first taste of alcohol and marijuana. He also suggests he lose his good guy demeanor. To woo her, Taylor joins the Alcoholics Anonymous meetings to hopefully connect with Krystal, despite the fact that he had alcohol only once in his life. He models a bad-boy image of Bo, another AA member, walking her home.

He finds out Krystal is the working-class single mother of Bobby, a teenager two years younger than Taylor. Bobby requires a wheelchair after his father ran him over while intoxicated.

Taylor accompanies Krystal when she collects Bobby from school, who's suspended for aggression. He tells her ex Willie was stalking him, which she doesn't believe. She asks Taylor to get him home. On the way, they stop by the gallery.

There, Willie shows up, telling Bobby to go with him. Knowing he doesn't want to go, Taylor stands up to him, getting knifed in the leg. Bobby takes him out with the chair, and they hightail it out of there. He finds them but gets hit by a car.

That evening, when Krystal comes home, she treats Taylor's wound and they are intimate. The next day, when she and Bobby come for lunch, Taylor's family behaves abysmally so they leave. He chases her down at the AA meeting, where Bo is speaking again. Krystal realizes who he's been emulating. She stomps out and drags her ex Willie, who had followed them, with her.

Several days pass, Taylor pining for Krystal, and finally, Bobby calls for help. He finds them holed up in a motel, Krystal high. Taylor takes them back to his parents' where Willie has shown up. As another PAT attack has come on they rush to the hospital, but Krystal soothes him. Some days later, she heads off for a detox program, leaving Bobby with Taylor and his family.

== Cast ==
- Nick Robinson as Taylor "Tay-Tay" Ogburn, Campbell's brother
  - Abraham Touchet as Young Taylor "Tay-Tay" Ogburn
- Grant Gustin as Campbell Ogburn, Taylor's brother
- Rosario Dawson as Krystal Bryant, Bobby's mother and Taylor's love interest
- William H. Macy as Wyatt Ogburn, Campbell and Taylor's father
- William Fichtner as Dr. Lyle Farley
- Kathy Bates as Vera Greenwood, Taylor's boss
- Felicity Huffman as Poppy Ogburn, Campbell and Taylor's mother
- Rick Fox as Bo
- Jacob Latimore as Bobby Bryant, Krystal's son
- T.I. as Willie, Krystal's ex
- Amy Parrish as Taryn

== Production ==
On March 29, 2016, Grant Gustin, Rosario Dawson, William H. Macy, Kathy Bates, John Leguizamo, Felicity Huffman, T.I. and Nick Robinson joined the cast of the film. Principal photography began on April 18, 2016. Several scenes were shot on Stage A at Pinewood Atlanta Studios.

== Release ==
The film had its world premiere at the Virginia Film Festival on November 10, 2017. It was released on April 13, 2018, by Great Point Media and Paladin.

== Reception ==
On review aggregator website Rotten Tomatoes, the film holds an approval rating of 10% based on 20 reviews, and an average rating of 3.8/10. The site's critical consensus reads, "Krystal hinges -- and ultimately stumbles -- on character behavior that beggars belief, defies logic, and finally runs well beyond the average viewer's ability to care." On Metacritic, which assigns a normalized rating to reviews, the film has a weighted average score of 39 out of 100, based on 10 critics, indicating "generally unfavorable" reviews.
