= Christopher Barzak =

American author

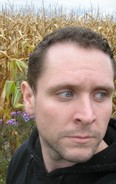
- Barzak, in Kinsman, Ohio
- Born: July 21, 1975 (age 51); Warren, Ohio, U.S.
- Education: Chatham University (MFA), Youngstown State University (BA, MA)
- Occupations: Novelist; short story writer; teacher
- Writing career
- Period: 1999–present
- Genres: Fiction, young adult fiction, fantasy, general literature
- Website: christopherbarzak.com

Christopher Barzak (born July 21, 1975) is an American author. He has published many short stories, beginning with "A Mad Tea Party" in Lady Churchill's Rosebud Wristlet in 1999. In 2007 he published his debut novel, One for Sorrow, which won the 2008 Crawford Award, and was a finalist for the 2008 Great Lakes Book Award as well as Logo TV's NewNowNext Awards. His second novel, The Love We Share Without Knowing, was a 2008 James Tiptree Jr. Award finalist and a 2009 Nebula Awards finalist for Best Novel. His first full-length short story collection, Before and Afterlives, was the recipient of the Shirley Jackson Award for Best Single-Author Collection in 2013.

== Biography ==
Barzak grew up in Kinsman, Ohio and went to university in nearby Youngstown. He has worked as a teacher of English outside of Tokyo, in both primary and middle schools. His experiences over two years abroad in Japan led him to write his second novel, The Love We Share Without Knowing.

Barzak also holds an MFA in Creative Writing from Chatham University in Pittsburgh, Pennsylvania. He currently teaches fiction writing at Youngstown State University, in Youngstown, Ohio.

His first novel, One for Sorrow, was made into the feature film Jamie Marks is Dead by the director, Carter Smith, for Verisimilitude Films, starring Liv Tyler, Judy Greer, Cameron Monaghan, Noah Silver, and Morgan Saylor. The film debuted at the 2014 Sundance Film Festival in the U.S. Dramatic Competition. The film had a limited release by Gravitas Ventures in the United States on August 29, 2014 and is now available on demand or on DVD.

His third novel, Wonders of the Invisible World, was published on September 8, 2015 and won a Stonewall Honor Award from the American Library Association in January, 2016.

His fourth novel, The Gone Away Place, was published in May, 2018, by Knopf Books, and won the inaugural Whippoorwill Award for books that represent the diversity that exists in rural communities. The Gone Away Place was also selected as a Choose to Read Ohio book for the years 2020-2022 by the State Library of Ohio, the Ohioana Library, and The Ohio Center for the Book.

== Bibliography ==
=== Novels ===
- One for Sorrow, New York: Bantam, 2007.
- The Love We Share Without Knowing, New York: Bantam, 2008.
- Wonders of the Invisible World, New York: Alfred A. Knopf Books, 2015.
- The Gone Away Place, New York: Alfred A Knopf Books, 2018.

=== Short story collections ===
- Birds and Birthdays, Seattle, WA: Aqueduct Press, 2012.
- Before and Afterlives, Maple Shade, NJ: Lethe Press, 2013.
- Monstrous Alterations, Amherst, MA: Lethe Press, 2023.

Novellas

- A Voice Calling, Woodbury, VT: Psychopomp, 2024.

=== Selected stories (award winners or finalists) ===
- "The Other Angelas", 2004 James Tiptree Jr. Award finalist
- "The Language of Moths", 2006 Locus Awards and 2007 Nebula Awards finalist for Best Novelette
- "Map of Seventeen", 2010 Nebula Awards and 2011 Locus Awards finalist for Best Novelette
- "Smoke City", 2012 Locus Awards finalist for Best Short Story
- "Invisible Men", 2013 Million Writers Award finalist
- "Paranormal Romance", 2014 Nebula Awards and Locus Awards finalist for Best Novelette

=== As editor ===
- Sherman, Delia; Barzak, Christopher, eds. (2009). Interfictions 2 : an anthology of interstitial fiction. Small Beer Press.
- Interfictions Online (with Meghan McCarron and Sofia Samatar). Interstitial Arts Foundation, 2013 to 2016.

== Personal life ==
In October 2017, Barzak was arrested for assaulting his husband, however, in May 2018 the alleged victim confessed in court that he was under the influence at the time and that the charges should be dropped. In an earlier sentencing hearing Barzak pleaded guilty to a lesser charge and agreed to attend counseling. The plea was held in abeyance and the case dismissed after the alleged victim confessed.
