= Elizabeth Wood (director) =

American film director and screenwriter

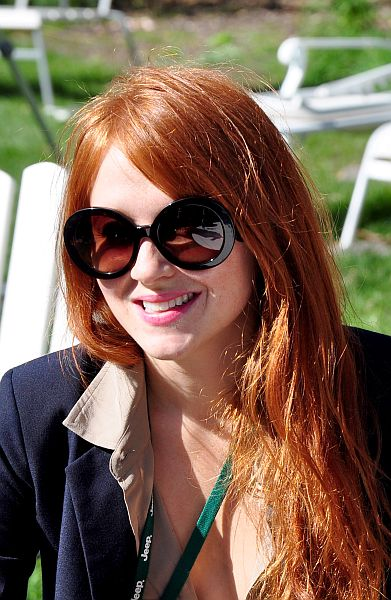
- Wood in 2011
- Occupations: Film director; screenwriter
- Years active: 2007–present
- Spouse: Gabriel Nussbaum (m. 2009)

Elizabeth Wood is an American film director and screenwriter, best known for her feature film debut White Girl.

== Film career ==
In 2007, Wood made her feature film debut with the documentary film Wade in the Water Children, revolving around a violent neighborhood in New Orleans, Louisiana.

Wood made her narrative feature film debut with White Girl which premiere at the 2016 Sundance Film Festival on January 23, 2016. FilmRise and Netflix later acquired distribution rights to the film. It was released on September 2, 2016. The film is loosely based on Wood's life. In 2025 she and her husband, Gabriel Nussbaum, were working on a film titled Triumph of the Will set in Nazi Germany being filmed in Albany, New York and Troy, New York.

== Personal life ==
Wood has been married to producer and director Gabriel Nussbaum since 2009. The two operate the production company Bank Street Films.

== Filmography ==
Documentary film

- Wade in the Water, Children (2007)

Short film

Year	Title	Director	Producer	Writer	DoP	Editor
2010	Cut Throat	Yes	Yes	Yes	Yes	No
2010	Autopilot	Yes	Yes	Yes	No	Yes
2011	Loft	Yes	Yes	No	No	No

Feature film

Year	Title	Director	Producer	Writer
2016	White Girl	Yes	No	Yes
TBA	Triumph of the Will	No	Yes	No
