= Jamie Marks Is Dead =

- Sundance film poster
- Directed by: Carter Smith
- Screenplay by: Carter Smith
- Based on: One for Sorrow by Christopher Barzak
- Produced by: Omri Bezalel; Hunter Gray; Carter Smith; Jacob Jaffke; Alex Orlovsky
- Starring: Cameron Monaghan; Liv Tyler; Judy Greer; Morgan Saylor; Noah Silver; Madisen Beaty
- Cinematography: Darren Lew
- Edited by: Eric Nagy
- Music by: François-Eudes Chanfrault
- Production company: Verisimilitude
- Distributed by: Gravitas Ventures
- Release dates: January 19, 2014 (Sundance); August 29, 2014 (United States)
- Running time: 100 minutes
- Country: United States
- Language: English
- Budget: $3 million

Jamie Marks Is Dead is a 2014 American supernatural horror drama film written and directed by Carter Smith, and starring Cameron Monaghan, Liv Tyler, Judy Greer, Morgan Saylor, Noah Silver and Madisen Beaty. Its plot follows a high school athlete who is haunted by the ghost of a classmate who was found dead under mysterious circumstances. It is based on Christopher Barzak's 2007 novel One for Sorrow.

The film premiered in-competition in the US Dramatic Category at 2014 Sundance Film Festival on January 19, 2014 before it was given a limited theatrical release in the United States on August 29, 2014.

It was met with mixed reviews from film critics.

== Plot ==
Teenager Gracie Highsmith discovers the dead body of classmate Jamie Marks near a river in a small town in upstate New York. Jamie was an introverted social outcast who was not well-known by his classmates. Police begin investigating his death, suspecting he may have been murdered. High-school track star Adam McCormick is bothered by the discovery, and recounts fleeting memories of witnessing Jamie being severely bullied by their peers. Adam goes to visit the site where Jamie's body was found, and finds Gracie there, creating a memorial for Jamie. Adam and Gracie share mixed drinks at her house one night. Gracie tells Adam she feels sorry for Jamie, as he never experienced love during his short life.

One evening, Adam's single mother, Linda, is struck by a van driven by a woman named Lucy while backing out of their driveway. The car accident leaves Linda unable to walk. Lucy visits their home to make amends, and Linda is welcoming of her, though Adam expresses anger; the women form a friendship despite Adam's reluctance. Adam visits Gracie's house, and the two witness an apparition of Jamie standing outside in the woods at the edge of her yard. Adam is shaken by the event, and en route home, stops at the river. Jamie again appears to Adam, and asks him to lie down in the spot where his body was found. Adam is suddenly awoken by his friends, who have been partying nearby, and is driven home.

Adam is recurrently visited by Jamie, who appears to him in his bedroom. When Adam tells Gracie about this, she tells him she too has felt Jamie's presence, but has chosen to ignore it as it frightens her. Jamie asks Adam to meet him at an abandoned house one night, and the two share stories in the barn. Jamie recounts memories he had in life of Adam; Adam is surprised by this, but also recounts having noticed Jamie in passing. The two are disrupted by Frances, a vengeful spirit who haunts the abandoned home, where she murdered her parents before killing herself years ago. Angered by Frances's crude outburst, Adam burns the abandoned house down, causing Frances to launch into a violent rage. Jamie manages to wrangle Frances from Adam, and Adam flees.

Adam later meets with Jamie near an abandoned train tunnel where other spirits congregate, as it functions as a portal to the afterlife. He and Jamie's bond continues to grow, and Jamie reveals that he was in love with Adam in life, but his shyness and fear of rejection prevented him from ever getting to know him. When Adam returns home, he is tormented by Frances, who appears to him in his house, seeking revenge over her ruined home. Adam is protected by Jamie, who calms the incorrigible Frances. Adam later meets with Gracie at her home, where she reveals to him a written note she found with Jamie's body, which she hid from police. The note contains a list of people and things that Jamie would "like to kill"—including himself, though explicitly excluding Adam. Adam realizes Jamie committed suicide. Jamie appears to them both, enraged that Gracie exposed the note to Adam.

Jamie eventually calms, and with Adam and Gracie's urging, agrees to move on into the afterlife. They drive to the abandoned train tunnel, and Adam walks toward it with Jamie. Still in love with Adam, Jamie asks Adam to stay with him forever. Adam tells Jamie he loves him, albeit platonically. Adam gives Jamie one final word, "love". The two embrace before Jamie gives Adam his glasses, and walks on into the tunnel.

== Cast ==
- Cameron Monaghan as Adam McCormick
- Noah Silver as Jamie Marks
- Liv Tyler as Linda McCormick
- Judy Greer as Lucy
- Morgan Saylor as Gracie Highsmith
- Madisen Beaty as Frances Wilkinson
- Ronen Rubinstein as Ronnie
- Brett DelBuono as Matt Hardin
- Ryan Munzert as Aaron McCormick

== Production ==
Filming took place in New Hamburg and Monticello, New York in the winter and spring of 2013. Monticello High School and the abandoned Apollo Mall were used as filming locations.

== Release ==
=== Box office ===
The film was given a limited theatrical release in the United States on August 29, 2014. The film earned $58,943 in domestic DVD sales.

=== Critical reception ===
On the review aggregator website Rotten Tomatoes, 56% of 18 critics' reviews are positive. Metacritic, which uses a weighted average, assigned the film a score of 49 out of 100, based on 7 critics, indicating "mixed or average" reviews.

Dennis Harvey, in his review for Variety, gave the film a positive review by saying that "The potentially ludicrous story is handled artfully enough here to cast an eerie but not off-putting spell throughout, though the ultimate point is more than a tad murky, and the desired poignancy doesn't fully come across." John DeFore in his review for The Hollywood Reporter called the film "A sincere, psychologically savvy take on YA supernatural fare." Kyle Burton of Indiewire praised the film and said that "Carter Smith's Jamie Marks is Dead is a spooky rendition of teenage passion and shame. It has requisite angst and melodrama, but they're guided by the film's immersive atmosphere and sense of place. It's a gothic romance—a sort of coming out, bullying story that projects onto its world the moods and emotions of its characters." Jordan Raup of The Film Stage praised Carter Smith's direction that "Smith's expertise in crafting visceral, frightening scenarios—exemplified in his somewhat under-appreciated studio horror feature The Ruins—is fully on display here. Conjuring a gloomy view, in both the afterlife and the real world, the director seems to be in complete control of his vision, particularly in the sound design and downcast cinematography."
