= Nick Robinson (American actor) =

American actor (born 1995)

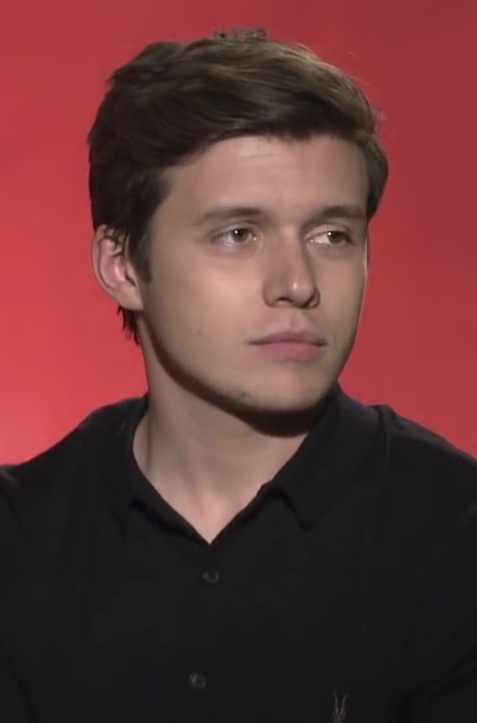
- Robinson promoting Love, Simon in 2018
- Born: Nicholas John Robinson; March 22, 1995 (age 31); Seattle, Washington, U.S.
- Education: New York University
- Occupation: Actor
- Years active: 2007–present

Nicholas John Robinson (born March 22, 1995) is an American actor. As a child, he appeared in a 2008 stage production of A Christmas Carol and Mame, after which he had a main role in the television sitcom Melissa & Joey (2010–2015).

Robinson went on to play a supporting role in the adventure film Jurassic World (2015) and took on lead roles in several teen dramas, including The Kings of Summer (2013), The 5th Wave (2016), Everything, Everything (2017), and Love, Simon (2018). He has since starred in the drama miniseries A Teacher (2020) and Maid (2021). In 2026 he starred in the romantic comedy Voicemails for Isabelle.

== Early life ==
Robinson was born on March 22, 1995, in Seattle, Washington. He has four younger siblings. Robinson initially attended Seattle Preparatory School but left in the middle of his freshman year and moved to Los Angeles after booking a regular role on Melissa & Joey. He graduated from Campbell Hall School in 2013. He was accepted to New York University’s College of Arts and Sciences and attended in the summer to work on another season of Melissa & Joey.

== Career ==
Robinson made his professional acting debut at the age of 11 with a role in a stage adaptation of Charles Dickens' novel A Christmas Carol. Talent scout Matt Casella recommended him to a few agencies, and Robinson was eventually signed with the Los Angeles-based Savage Agency. Because of the 2007–2008 Writers Guild of America strike, Robinson's family moved back to Washington, where he continued to perform on stage in and around Seattle.

In 2010 Robinson was cast in the role of Ryder Scanlon, the nephew of Melissa Joan Hart's character, on the ABC Family sitcom Melissa & Joey, playing the character until its cancellation in 2015.

In 2011, while on hiatus from Melissa & Joey, Robinson began filming of the Disney Channel original movie Frenemies; Robinson played the role of Jake Logan. Frenemies premiered in January 2012, on the Disney Channel.

In 2012 Robinson was cast in the lead role of Joe Toy in director Jordan Vogt-Roberts' The Kings of Summer. He also guest-starred in the episode "Blue Bell Boy" during the third season of HBO's Boardwalk Empire. He also began appearing in a series of television commercials for Cox Communications entitled "Buffer Time is Bonding Time".

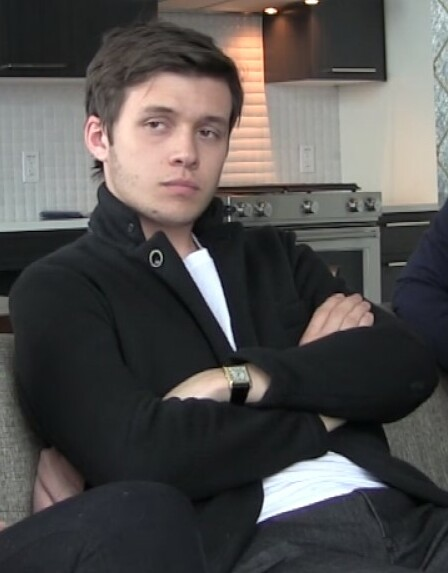
Robinson in 2018

In 2015 Robinson portrayed Zach Mitchell in Jurassic World, in which he was widely seen. He played Ben Parish in the film adaptation of the novel The 5th Wave, which was released in January 2016. These roles made him unavailable for multiple episodes of the final season of Melissa & Joey, but he returned for the final three episodes.

He played the titular lead in the independent film Being Charlie, a semi-autobiographical feature about director Rob Reiner's relationship with his son, which premiered at the 2015 Toronto International Film Festival; the film was released theatrically in 2016.

In 2017 he starred in William H. Macy's comedy-drama film Krystal, and as Olly in Everything, Everything, a film adaptation of the 2015 novel.

In 2018 Robinson starred as the titular Simon Spier in the gay coming out teen drama film Love, Simon. The film was considered ground-breaking because it was the first major studio film to focus on a gay teenage romance. Robinson's performance as Simon garnered critical acclaim. After reading the script, Robinson revealed that he broke his own rule to no longer play high schoolers because he saw the cultural importance of the film. That year, Robinson was named in Forbes' "30 Under 30" list in the Hollywood & Entertainment category. In 2019, he co-starred in the third film version of Richard Wright's Native Son.

In 2020 Robinson co-starred in the FX miniseries A Teacher, and he narrated his DM responses to the protagonist of Love, Victor, a Love, Simon spinoff TV series on Hulu, and appeared in two episodes of the show. In 2021, he starred in the Netflix miniseries Maid, opposite Margaret Qualley and Andie MacDowell.

== Filmography ==
=== Film ===
Year	Title	Role	Notes
2013	The Kings of Summer	Joe Toy	
2015	Jurassic World	Zach Mitchell	
2015	Being Charlie	Charlie Mills	
2016	The 5th Wave	Ben Parish	
2017	Kong: Skull Island	Bar guest #2	Cameo
2017	Everything, Everything	Olly Bright	
2017	Krystal	Taylor Ogburn	
2018	Love, Simon	Simon Spier	
2019	Native Son	Jan Erlone	
2019	Strange but True	Phillip Chase	
2020	Shadow in the Cloud	Stu Beckell	
2021	Silk Road	Ross Ulbricht	
2023	Shadow Brother Sunday	Jacob	Short film
2024	Damsel	Prince Henry	
2024	Snack Shack	Shane Workman	
2024	Turn Me On	William	
2025	Charlie Harper	Charlie	
2026	Voicemails for Isabelle	Wes	

=== Television ===
Key
†	Denotes television productions that have not yet been released

Year	Title	Role	Notes
2010–2015	Melissa & Joey	Ryder Scanlon	Main role
2012	Frenemies	Jake Logan	Television film
2012	Boardwalk Empire	Rowland Smith	Episode: "Blue Bell Boy"
2020	A Teacher	Eric Walker	Main role; miniseries
2020–2021	Love, Victor	Simon Spier	Special guest star and producer (seasons 1–2)
2021	Maid	Sean Boyd	Main role; miniseries
2023	History of the World, Part II	Robert Todd Lincoln	Episodes: "I", "II", "V", "VI"
2025	The Abandons	Elias Teller	Main role
2026	Kennedy †	Joe Kennedy Jr.	Main role; upcoming drama series

=== Video games ===
Year	Title	Role	Notes
2015	Lego Jurassic World	Zach Mitchell	Voice
2015	Lego Dimensions	Zach Mitchell	Voice

=== Theatre ===
Year	Title	Role	Venue
2007	To Kill a Mockingbird	Jem Finch	Intiman Playhouse
2007–2008	A Christmas Carol	Ensemble	ACT Theatre
2008	Mame	Patrick Dennis	5th Avenue Theatre
2009	A Thousand Clowns	Nick Burns	Intiman Playhouse
2010	Lost in Yonkers	Arty Kurnitz	Village Theatre
2019	To Kill a Mockingbird	Jem Finch	Shubert Theatre

=== Audio ===
Year	Title	Role	Notes
2026	The Honeymooners	Henry	Main role

== Awards and nominations ==
Year	Award	Category	Work	Result	Ref.
2013	Phoenix Film Critics Society Awards	Best Performance by a Youth in a Lead or Supporting Role – Male	The Kings of Summer	Nominated	
2015	Young Entertainer Awards	Best Leading Young Actor – Feature Film	Jurassic World	Nominated	
2017	Teen Choice Awards	Choice Drama Movie Actor	Everything, Everything	Nominated	
2018	MTV Movie & TV Awards	Best Kiss (shared with Keiynan Lonsdale)	Love, Simon	Won	
2018	Human Rights Campaign	Ally for Equality Award	Love, Simon	Won	
2018	Maui Film Festival	Rising Star Award	Love, Simon	Won	
2018	Teen Choice Awards	Choice Breakout Movie Star	Love, Simon	Won	
2018	Teen Choice Awards	Choice Movie Ship (shared with Keiynan Lonsdale)	Love, Simon	Nominated	
2018	Los Angeles Online Film Critics Society	Best Actor	Love, Simon	Nominated	
2018	People's Choice Awards	The Male Movie Star of 2018	Love, Simon	Nominated	
2018	People's Choice Awards	The Comedy Movie Star of 2018	Love, Simon	Nominated	
2019	Satellite Awards	Best Actor in Motion Picture, Comedy or Musical	Love, Simon	Nominated	
