= Arthur Pine =

- Born: Arthur Pincus; April 20, 1917; Brighton Beach, New York, US
- Died: October 26, 2000 (aged 83); Port Washington, New York, US
- Other names: Jay Richards, J. Richards
- Occupations: Publicist, literary agent, author, composer
- Spouse: Harriette Scheiner (m. 1950–2000; his death)
- Children: 2 sons

Arthur Pine (born Arthur Pincus; April 20, 1917 – October 26, 2000) was an American publicist, literary agent, self-help author, composer and playwright. He is also widely credited as the man behind the initial incarnation of Citizenship Day.

== Early life ==
He was born on April 20, 1917, in the Brighton Beach section of Brooklyn, the eldest of two sons born to Charles and Anna Pincus. While still in high school, the future publicist's pre-Pine byline found its way onto the pages of New York's Picture Newspaper when Pincus earned a five-dollar prize for his submission of the question ultimately selected for the December 9, 1934 edition of the paper's semi-regular person-on-the-street column, "The Inquiring Photographer."

== Career ==
Arthur Pincus attended City College with every intention of pursuing a teaching career, but soon found that his heavy Brooklyn accent presented an all but insurmountable obstacle. Quickly shifting gears, he focused on finance, marketing and advertising while also writing and performing songs and plays. Accepting an entry-level position in an established firm, Pincus quickly attracted a number of music clients and resolved to start his own company. He realized, however, that a name change would be advisable; not merely for purposes of de-ethnicization, but also by way of distancing himself from the famously disreputable character "Pinkie Pincus," as then recently portrayed onstage by comic Lou Holtz. Thus was born not only a legally named Arthur Pine, but also the Arthur Pine Agency and, not long after, Arthur Pine Associates.

Although at first, Pine's client base was composed primarily of performers (e.g. Gordon, Dinah Shore, Betty Madigan, Delores Gray, Betty Garrett, Lisa Kirk and Ella Logan), by the 1970s, the firm was functioning almost exclusively as a literary agency, albeit one with a high quotient of show-biz-related projects.

== Notable clients ==
From Independent obituary, unless otherwise indicated.

- Jim Bacon
- Jack Benny
- Milton Berle
- George Burns
- Sammy Cahn
- Carroll Carroll
- John Clive
- Sonia Darrin
- Jimmy Durante
- Wayne Dyer
- Blossom Elfman
- Totie Fields
- Betty Garrett
- Gray Gordon
- Dolores Gray
- James Grippando
- Red Holzman
- Bob Hope
- Billie Jean King
- Lisa Kirk
- Richard Kollmar
- The Korn Kobblers
- Hedy Lamarr
- Michael LeBoeuf
- Michael Levine,
- Liberace
- Ella Logan
- Betty Madigan
- Michael Medved
- Marc Olden
- James Patterson
- Susan RoAne
- Dinah Shore
- Phil Silvers
- Jack Smith
- Cameron Stauth
- Sylvia Wallace
- Walter Wanger
- Jack M. Warner
- Earl Wilson
- Bob Wolff

== Personal life ==
On December 24, 1950, at the Gramercy Park Hotel in Manhattan, Arthur Pine and fashion stylist Harriette Scheiner were married and remained so until his death nearly 50 years later, even as preparations were underway for their golden wedding anniversary. During the 1950s and sixties, the Pines raised two sons, David Jay and Richard S. Pine, Richard later becoming a member of his father's firm and eventually a prominent literary agent in his own right. Consequently, most, if not all, of Arthur Pine's subsequent composing and arranging credits bore the pseudonym Jay (or J.) Richards.

== Works ==
=== Books ===
- Your Family Business: A Practical, Step-by-Step Guide for Making Both Your Relationships and Your Business Rewarding and Successful (1990)
- One Door Closes, Another Door Opens: Turning Your Setbacks Into Comebacks (1994), with Julie Houston
- Unexpected Roads: A Personal Success Journal (1995), with Julie Houston
- It Must Have Been a Miracle: Everyday Lives Touched by Miracles (1995), by Kelsey Tyler (joint pseudonym of Pine and Karen Kingsbury)

=== Musical Comedies ===
- Golden Glory (1939, un-produced; with Gray Gordon)
- High Tide (1943), optioned by Jerry Lester

=== Songs ===
- "We're In It, Let's Win It" (1942, with Leo Corday and Harold Grant)
- "Victory Polka" (1942, with Bernie Bierman)
- "The Big Sleep" (1946, with Sonia Darrin); never recorded, but performed and broadcast live on WOR on Saturday October 19, 1946
- "Just Like Sam" (1958, as Jay Richards, with Mort Garson and Earl Shuman)
- "Sandy the Sound Man" (1959, as Jay Richards, with Leonard Whitcup, Chet Gierlach)
- "The Wishing Song" (1960, as Jay Richards, with Eddy Manson)
- "The Forfeit Game" (1964, with Harriette Pine); on Jim Ameche's Humpty Dumpty
