= Juliette Paskowitz =

American surfing figure (1932–2021)

- Juliette Paskowitz, from a 2021 obituary
- Born: Juliet Emilia Paez; January 12, 1932; Long Beach, California, U.S.
- Died: May 3, 2021 (aged 89); San Clemente, California, U.S.
- Spouse: Dorian "Doc" Paskowitz
- Children: 9, including Salvador Paskowitz
- Relatives: Sonia Darrin (sister-in-law), Mason Reese (nephew)

Juliette Paskowitz (January 12, 1932 – May 3, 2021), born Juliet Emilia Paez, was an American singer and matriarch of "the First Family of Surfing".

== Early life ==
Juliette Emilia Paez was born in Long Beach, California, one of eight children born to Mexican immigrants Salvador Paez and Emilia Paez. She trained as an opera singer at Long Beach State University.

== Career ==
Juliette Paez worked as a telephone operator and was a singer with the Roger Wagner Chorale before she married. Paskowitz and her husband opened a surf school at San Onofre in 1975. Along with their children, they were called "the First Family of Surfing". In 1991, the whole family recorded a song written by son David, "It's Real". A documentary, Surfwise: The Amazing True Odyssey of the Paskowitz Family (2007), explored their work and their unusual family life. She also appeared on The Daily Habit (2008), a news program about surfing, skateboarding, and snowboarding. She sued Lionsgate Television and Polsky Films in 2015, for money owed from another project based on the family's story.

== Personal life and legacy ==
In 1959, Paez converted to Judaism, learned to surf, and married physician and surfer Dorian "Doc" Paskowitz, as his third wife. (They also married in 1964 in Hawaii.) They had nine children, eight sons and a daughter, born between 1959 and 1974, and raised the children in camper homes, traveling often including stints in Mexico, Hawaii and Israel, but usually based near San Clemente. After their children were grown, the Paskowitzes lived in Baja California.

She was widowed when Doc Paskowitz died in 2014, and she died in 2021, aged 89 years, at a care home in San Clemente, California. She was survived by her nine children: David, Jonathan, Abraham, Israel, Moses, Adam, Salvador, Joshua, and Navah, as well as 27 grandchildren and six great grandchildren.

Her son Salvador Paskowitz became a noted screenwriter. Her daughter, Navah Paskowitz, married actor Ed Asner's son Matt, and is active in autism charities. Israel (Izzy) still runs Paskowitz Surf Camp, with sessions in California, Mexico, and New York.
