= J. Mills Goodloe =

American actor and director

- Born: November 15, 1966 (age 59); Fort Lauderdale, Florida, U.S.
- Education: Southern Methodist University

J. Mills Goodloe (born November 15, 1966) is an American film producer, screenwriter, director, and actor.

== Personal life ==
Goodloe grew up in Fort Lauderdale, Florida, and attended Southern Methodist University in Dallas, Texas.

== Early career ==
He began his career at Warner Brothers, working for director Richard Donner whose credits include Superman, The Omen, Scrooged and the Lethal Weapon series. Goodloe worked as Donner's assistant from 1992 to 1995 on films such as Lethal Weapon 3 and Maverick. In 1996, Goodloe was promoted to president of Donner Productions. Over the next four years, Goodloe produced Assassins, starring Sylvester Stallone and Julianne Moore, Conspiracy Theory starring Mel Gibson and Julia Roberts, and the final installment of the Lethal Weapon series starring Gibson, Danny Glover and Chris Rock. In 2001, Goodloe left Donner Productions to write and direct A Gentleman's Game starring Gary Sinise, Dylan Baker and Philip Baker Hall. The film was nominated for an ESPY Award in the category of Best Sports Film.

== Career ==
Goodloe wrote the adaptation of the John Grisham novel Bleachers for Revolution Studios. Goodloe also co-wrote the screenplay for the sports film Pride, released theatrically in 2007 by Lionsgate and starring Terrence Howard and Bernie Mac.

In August 2008, Goodloe was hired by Phoenix Pictures to adapt John Grisham's New York Times bestselling novel Playing for Pizza.

In October 2014, Relativity Media released Goodloe's adaptation of Nicholas Sparks' best-selling novel The Best of Me, starring Michelle Monaghan and James Marsden.

In 2014, The Hollywood Reporter announced that Sony Pictures hired Goodloe to write the screenplay for Christian the Lion with Neal H. Moritz's Original Film producing.

On April 24, 2015, Lionsgate released The Age of Adaline, an original Goodloe and Salvador Paskowitz screenplay, starring Blake Lively, Harrison Ford and Michiel Huisman.

Goodloe adapted the New York Times bestselling novel Everything, Everything for MGM studios. The film began principal photography in August 2016. Starring Nick Robinson and Amandla Stenberg, Warner Bros. released the film nationwide on May 19, 2017.

In August 2015, StudioCanal bought an original action-thriller pitch, Sana, from Goodloe. Sana, a drone-focused story follows an Air Force major whose entire squadron has been poisoned by a jihadist infiltrator.

Goodloe co-wrote the screenplay for the film The Mountain Between Us, with Chris Weitz. Starring Idris Elba and Kate Winslet, the romance drama was directed by Academy Award-nominated Hany Abu-Assad, and was released on October 6, 2017, by Fox.

In August 2016, Paramount Pictures announced it had engaged Goodloe to adapt the New York Times bestselling novel Anatomy of A Misfit, which will be produced by Rogue One producer Allison Shearmur.

In 2018, Lionsgate announced that Goodloe was hired to adapt How the Girl Guides Won the War for La La Land producer Marc Platt.

In 2019, Goodloe was hired to write To All the Boys: P.S. I Still Love You, the sequel to the hit Netflix YA movie To All the Boys I've Loved Before.

In December 2020, Goodloe was hired to write the music biopic Reckless Love for Paramount Pictures. The script is based on the hit song of the same name by Cory Asbury.

In October 2022, Goodloe Directed and Executive Produced the Feature Film Blue Eyed Girl, starring Beau Bridges, Marisa Coughlan, Freddy Rodriguez and Sam Trammell.

== Filmography ==
- Pride (Writer)
- A Gentleman's Game (Writer & Director)
- Lethal Weapon 4 (Co Producer)
- Double Tap (Executive Producer)
- Conspiracy Theory (Co Producer)
- Assassins (Assoc. Producer)
- The Best of Me (Writer, 2014)
- The Age of Adaline (Writer, 2015)
- Everything, Everything (Writer, 2017)
- To All the Boys: P.S. I Still Love You (Screenplay by, 2020 – Screenplay by Sofia Alvarez and J. Mills Goodloe )
