= The Big Sleep (1946 film) =

1946 US film noir by Howard Hawks

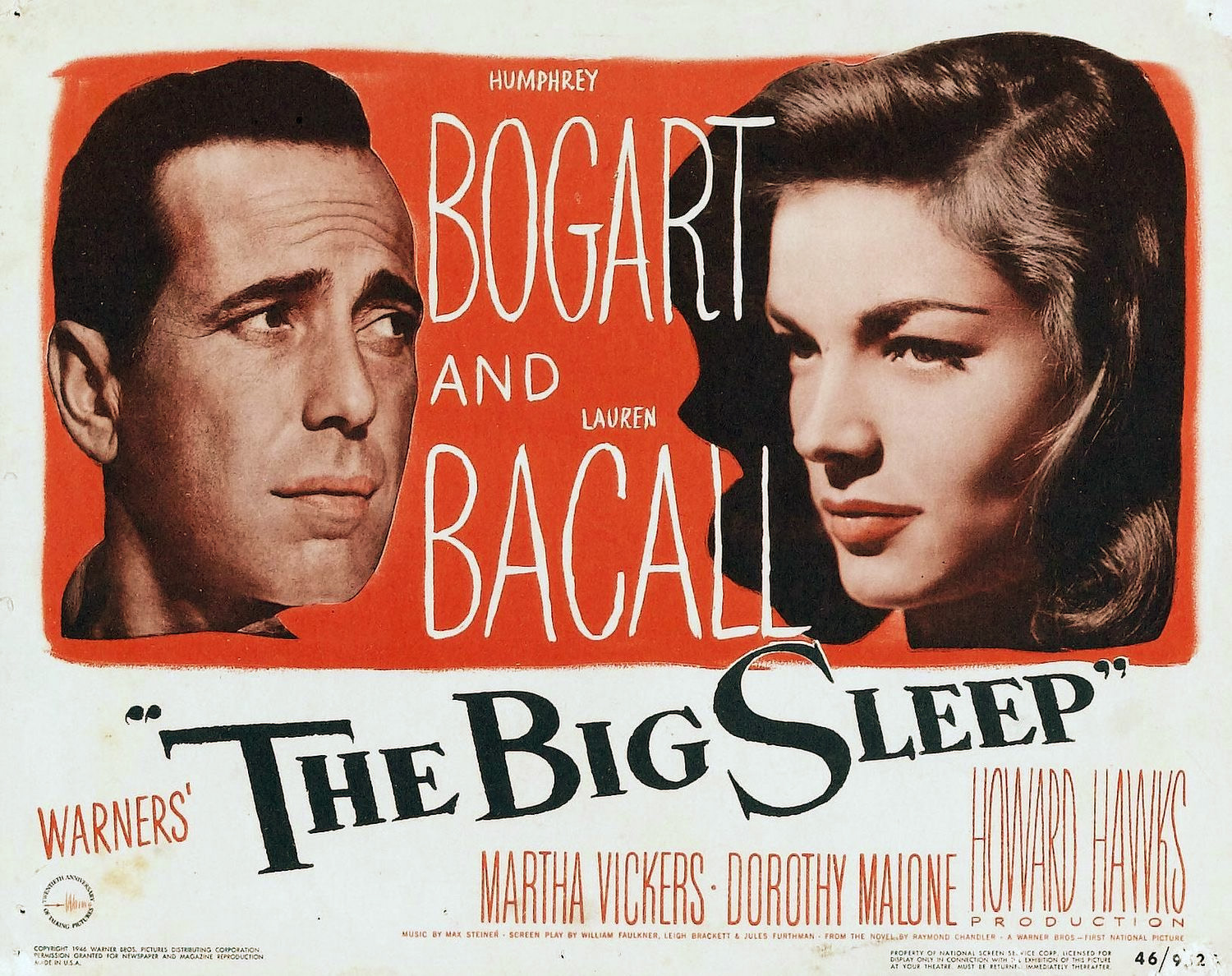
- Theatrical release lobby card
- Directed by: Howard Hawks
- Screenplay by: William Faulkner; Leigh Brackett; Jules Furthman
- Based on: The Big Sleep; 1939 novel by Raymond Chandler
- Produced by: Howard Hawks
- Starring: Humphrey Bogart; Lauren Bacall; Martha Vickers; Dorothy Malone
- Cinematography: Sidney Hickox
- Edited by: Christian Nyby
- Music by: Max Steiner
- Production company: Warner Bros. Pictures
- Distributed by: Warner Bros. Pictures
- Release dates: August 23, 1946 (New York City premiere); August 31, 1946 (US)
- Running time: 114 minutes (released cut); 116 minutes (re-released original cut)
- Country: United States
- Language: English
- Budget: $1.6 million
- Box office: $4.9 million

The Big Sleep is a 1946 American film noir directed by Howard Hawks. William Faulkner, Leigh Brackett and Jules Furthman co-wrote the screenplay, which adapts Raymond Chandler's 1939 novel. The film stars Humphrey Bogart as private detective Philip Marlowe and Lauren Bacall as Vivian Rutledge in a story that begins with blackmail and leads to multiple murders.

Initially produced in late 1944, the film's release was delayed by more than a year because the studio wanted to release war films in anticipation of the end of World War II. A cut was released to servicemen overseas in 1945 shortly after its completion. During the delay, Bogart and Bacall married and Bacall was cast in Confidential Agent. When that movie failed, reshoots of The Big Sleep were done in early 1946 meant to take advantage of the public's fascination with "Bogie and Bacall".

The Big Sleep was finally released by Warner Bros. Pictures on August 31, 1946. The film was a critical and commercial success and led to two more "Bogie and Bacall" films by Warner Bros.: Dark Passage (1947) and Key Largo (1948). In 1997, the original 1945 cut was restored and released. That same year the U.S. Library of Congress deemed the film "culturally, historically, or aesthetically significant" and was selected for preservation in the National Film Registry.

== Plot ==
Philip Marlowe, a private detective in Los Angeles, is summoned to the mansion of General Sternwood, who wants to resolve a series of debts his daughter Carmen owes to bookseller Arthur Geiger. As Marlowe leaves, Sternwood's older daughter, Vivian, stops him. She suspects her father's true motive for hiring a detective is to find his protégé, Sean Regan, who had disappeared a month earlier.

Marlowe stakes out Geiger's shop and then follows Geiger home. Hearing a gunshot and a woman's scream, he breaks in to find Geiger's body and a drugged Carmen, as well as a hidden camera minus its film. After taking Carmen home he returns and discovers that the body has disappeared. During the night Marlowe learns that Sternwood's driver, Owen Taylor, has been found dead in a limousine driven off the Lido Pier, having been struck on the back of the head.

Vivian comes to Marlowe's office the next morning with scandalous pictures of Carmen that she has received with a blackmail demand for the negatives. Marlowe returns to Geiger's bookstore and follows a car to the apartment of Joe Brody, a gambler who has previously blackmailed Sternwood. He then finds Carmen outside Geiger's house, where she insists that it was Brody who killed Geiger. They are interrupted by the landlord, a gangster named Eddie Mars who is a blackmailer and who also runs an auto theft ring.

Marlowe goes to Brody's apartment, where he finds Vivian and Agnes, Geiger's bookstore clerk. They are interrupted by Carmen, who demands her photos. Marlowe disarms her and sends her and Vivian home. Brody admits he was behind the blackmailing, having stolen the negatives from Taylor, but denies having murdered him. Brody is shot dead when he answers his door. Marlowe chases down and has the police arrest the killer, Geiger's former driver Carol Lundgren, who believes Brody was swindling him.

Vivian declares the case closed and pays Marlowe, though Marlowe remains suspicious. He visits Mars' casino and asks about Regan, who supposedly ran off with Mars' wife, but Mars is evasive. Vivian, who is also at the casino, wins a big wager and asks Marlowe to drive her home. In the casino parking lot, one of Eddie Mars' goons tries to rob Vivian of her winnings, but Marlowe pulls a gun, punches him, and tells him to tell his boss to lay off Vivian. Marlowe then presses Vivian on her connection with Mars but she admits nothing. Back at home, Marlowe finds a flirtatious Carmen waiting for him. She says she did not like Regan and mentions that Mars calls Vivian frequently. When she attempts to seduce Marlowe, he throws her out. The next day, Vivian tells him he can stop looking for Regan; he has been found in Mexico and she is going to see him.

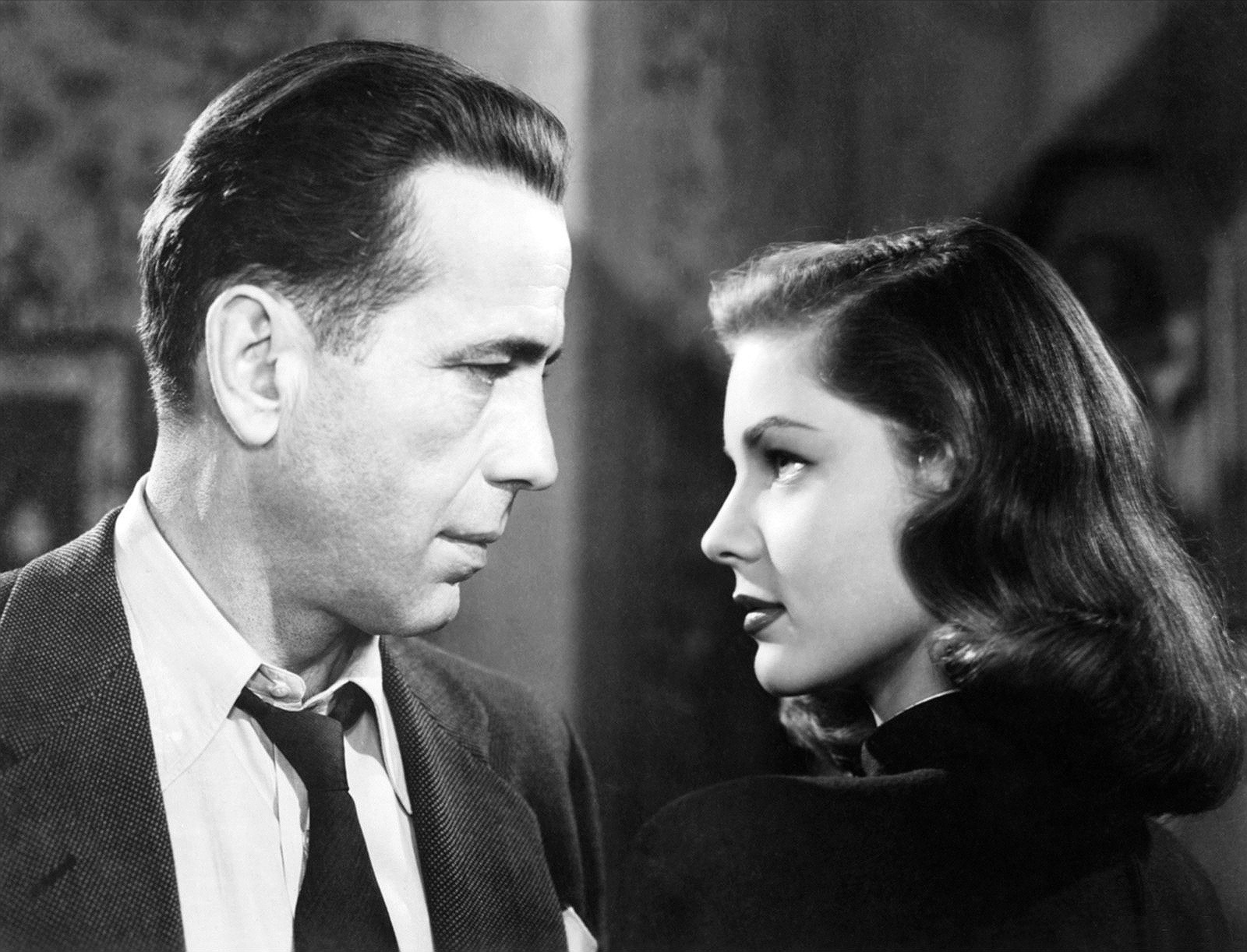
Philip Marlowe (Bogart) and Vivian Rutledge (Bacall) eye to eye

Mars has Marlowe beaten up to stop him from investigating further. He is found by Harry Jones, an associate of Agnes who is besotted with her. Jones conveys her offer to reveal Mars' wife's location for $200. When Marlowe goes to meet him and be taken to her hiding place, he spots Mars' hired gunman Canino threatening Jones until the latter reveals Agnes' address. Canino then forces Jones to drink deadly poison. Afterward, Marlowe discovers that Jones lied about Agnes' location.

Agnes arranges a meeting with Marlowe and tells him that she has seen Mrs. Mars behind an auto repair shop near a town called Realito. On his arrival at the shop, Marlowe is knocked out by Canino, and awakes tied up under the watch of Mrs. Mars. Vivian, also present, frees Marlowe who then runs to his car to retrieve a concealed gun. When Vivian distracts Canino, Marlow shoots and kills Canino during a brief gun battle. Vivian then tells Marlowe she's in love with him, and he reciprocates the feeling. They drive to Geiger's house and Marlowe makes a call to Mars, pretending to be still in Realito.

Mars arrives with four men, who set up an ambush outside. He enters and is surprised by Marlowe, who accuses him of blackmailing Vivian, as Carmen had killed Regan; Mars claims she did this in a mental haze, though Marlowe doubts Mars' credibility. He then forces Mars back outside, where he is shot by his own men. Marlowe calls the police, telling them that Mars killed Regan to cover for Carmen.

Marlowe convinces Vivian that her sister needs care at a psychiatric facility. The two then confirm their feelings for each other; and Vivian confesses that she has her own problems. When Marlowe asks what's wrong with her, she replies "nothing you can't fix."

== Cast ==
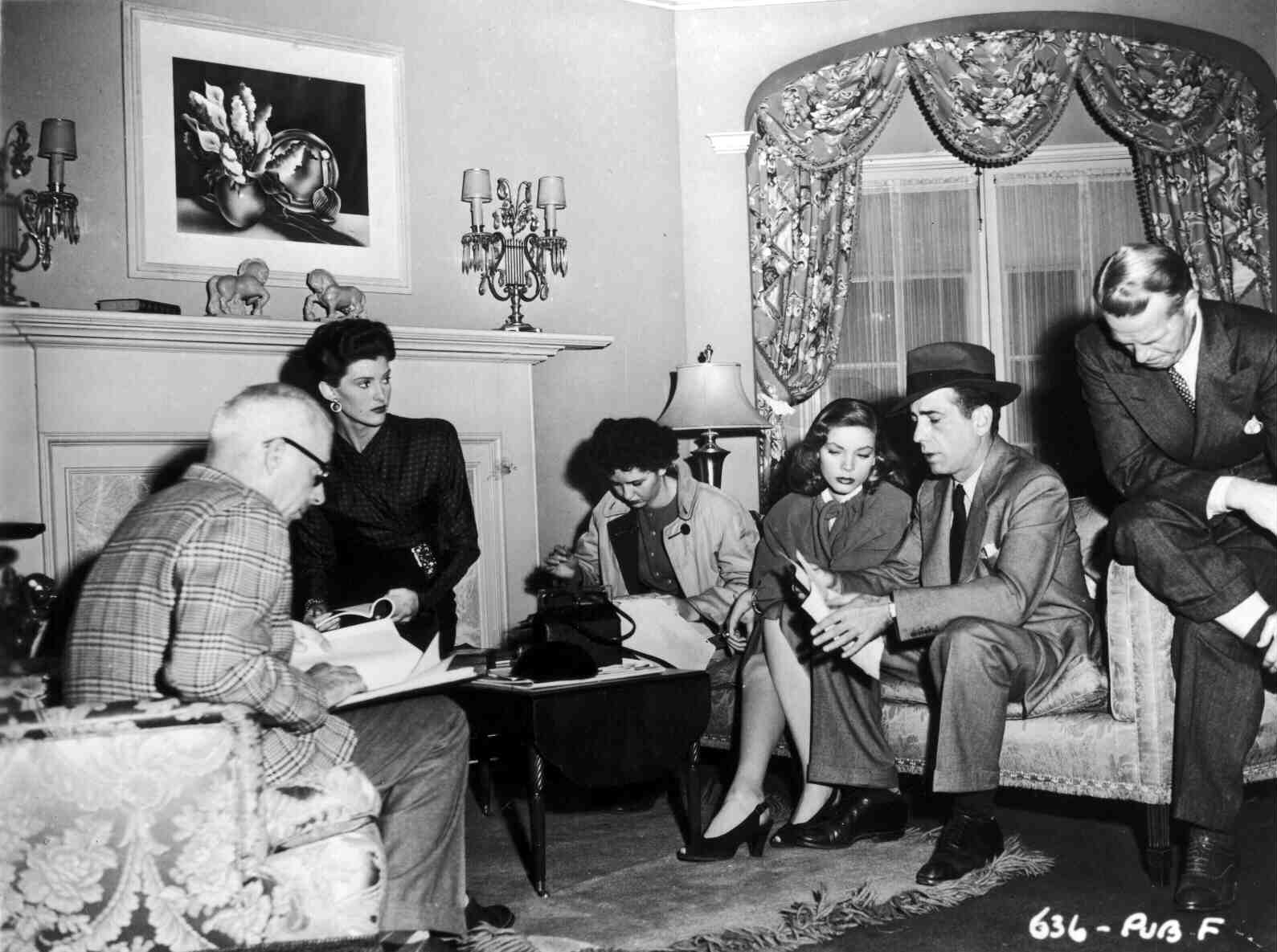
Cast of The Big Sleep between scenes, director Howard Hawks far left

- Humphrey Bogart as Philip Marlowe
- Lauren Bacall as Vivian Sternwood Rutledge
- John Ridgely as Eddie Mars
- Martha Vickers as Carmen Sternwood
- Sonia Darrin as Agnes Lowzier (uncredited)
- Dorothy Malone as Acme Bookstore proprietress
- Regis Toomey as Chief Inspector Bernie Ohls
- Peggy Knudsen as Mona Mars
- Charles Waldron as General Sternwood
- Charles D. Brown as Norris, Sternwood's butler
- Bob Steele as Lash Canino
- Elisha Cook Jr. as Harry Jones
- Louis Jean Heydt as Joe Brody
- Trevor Bardette as Art Huck, gas station owner (uncredited)
- Tommy Rafferty as Carol Lundgren (uncredited)
- Ben Welden as Pete, Mars' henchman (uncredited)
- Tom Fadden as Sidney, Mars' henchman (uncredited)
- Theodore von Eltz as A. G. Geiger (uncredited)
- Joy Barlow as Taxi Driver (uncredited)

== Production ==
=== Writing ===
Trailer for The Big Sleep

The Big Sleep is known for its convoluted plot. Similar to To Have and Have Not, there was no finalized script during filming due to the constant changes during production. The composition of the screenplay involved Hawks and three writers. Leigh Brackett and William Faulkner wrote alternating sections of the initial draft before exiting once they turned in their final draft. Jules Furthman and Hawks rewrote during production to help appease censorship from the Hays Office, which was vehement about excluding sexual themes. Although Chandler aimed to “disturb his readers” and their “sense of justice,” external pressure from the studios resulted in some of the books darker moments getting overshadowed by a romantic subplot or other censorship.

In the novel, Geiger is selling pornography – then illegal and often associated with organized crime – and is homosexual, having a relationship with Lundgren. Carmen is described as being nude in Geiger's house and later nude and in Marlowe's bed. The sexual orientation of Geiger and Lundgren goes unmentioned in the film because explicit references to homosexuality were prohibited. Carmen's sexuality from the novel also became more veiled. To pass the censorship Carmen had to be fully dressed and the pornographic elements could only be alluded to with cryptic references to photographs of Carmen wearing a "Chinese dress" and sitting in a "Chinese chair". A scene of her in Marlowe's bed was replaced with a scene in which she appears sitting fully dressed in Marlowe's apartment, for him to promptly kick her out. This scene was initially omitted from the 1945 cut but restored for the 1946 version. The film smoothes over these gritty moments, possibly to depict a more black and white type of morality. Due to the Hays Codes, which required that the act of seduction “never be more than suggested,” the film’s ending and Carmen’s reveal also became ambiguous. In novel, Marlowe witnesses the same violent behavior that leads Carmen to kill “Rusty” Regan, as she tries to shoot Marlowe in a fit of rage. The film, however, omits this scene and instead has Marlowe and Mars discuss Carmen’s behavior at the end of the film, attributing the murder to Carmen “liking” Regan. Much like the other censorship of Carmen’s sexuality, her motives for killing Regan are only briefly mentioned in the last minutes of the film and the studio simplifies the sexual themes of the novel. Midway through filming, Hawks and the cast realized that they did not know whether the chauffeur Owen Taylor had killed himself or was murdered. A cable was sent to Chandler, who told his friend Jamie Hamilton in a March 21, 1949 letter: "They sent me a wire ... asking me, and dammit I didn't know either".

Another major change came from Marlowe and Vivian’s relationship. Their dynamic becomes explicitly romantic in order to give the film a “happier” ending. Right before Marlowe confronts Mars, the two have a love confession as Marlowe says, “I guess I’m in love with you.” Hollywood's influence also pushed for this creative change. Charles K. Feldman, Lauren Bacall’s agent, forced Hawks to reshoot Bogart and Bacall’s scenes to add more chemistry, due to harsh criticism against Bacall’s performance. The hope was that audiences would warm up to Bacall if she was seen more as a romantic lead. As Roger Ebert wrote, “Some bad guys get killed and others get arrested, and we don’t much care–because the real result is that Bogart and Lauren Bacall end up in each other’s arms.”

=== Casting ===
Nina Foch had tested for the screen role of Carmen. Hawks cast Vickers in the role after seeing a modeling photo of her. He worked with Vickers closely on the role of Carmen and later convinced Warner Bros. Pictures to buy out her contract with Universal. Sonia Darrin was cast in the role of Agnes. Hawks did not like her initial screen test but after supervising her makeup and wardrobe for another test, he cast her in the part. Her credit in the movie's credits was removed when Warner Bros. studio head Jack L. Warner got into a feud with her agent Arthur Pine following the film's completion.

=== Production ===
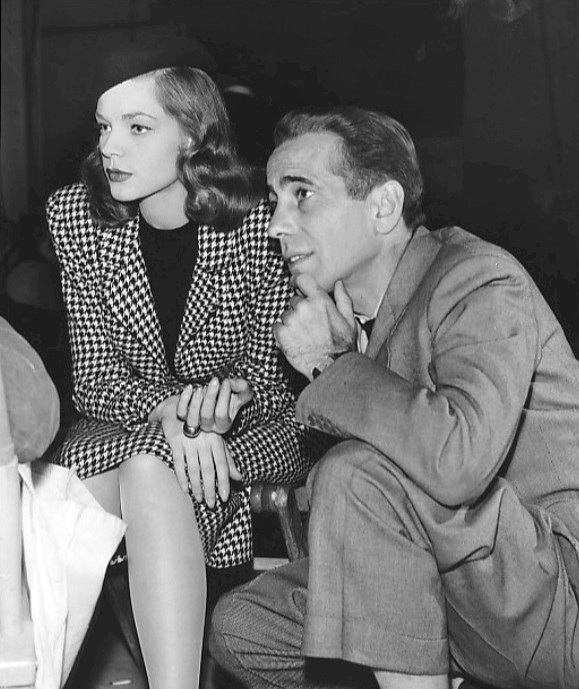
Bogart and Bacall on the set during filming

Principal photography on the film took place on the Warner Bros. backlot from October 10, 1944, to January 12, 1945. Filming was meant to be completed in late November, but was continually delayed due to Bogart's increased drinking. He was in the process of ending his tumultuous marriage to his wife Mayo Methot following his affair with Bacall during To Have and Have Not. As a result of his drinking and abuse from Methot, Bogart was unable to work for several days. When Jack Warner heard that in spite of this the cast was getting along, he sent this ribbing memo:

"Word has reached me that you are having fun on the set. This must stop."

=== Post-production ===
Although post-production ended in March 1945, The Big Sleep was delayed by Warner Bros. until they had turned out a backlog of war-related films. Because the war was ending, the studio feared the public might lose interest in the films, while The Big Sleep's subject was timeless. However, there are several indications of the film's wartime production, such as the female taxi driver who picks up Marlowe in one scene, with many traditionally male occupations being taken up by women following the draft. Wartime rationing also influences the film: dead bodies are called "red points", which referred to wartime meat rationing and Marlowe's car has a "B" gasoline rationing sticker in the lower passenger-side window, indicating he is essential to the war effort and therefore allowed 8 US gallons (30 L) of gasoline per week.

Soon after completing The Big Sleep, Bogart divorced Mayo Methot and married Bacall in May 1945. In June, Bacall began filming for her first film without Bogart, Confidential Agent. The film, released in November 1945, was deemed a critical and commercial disappointment, with Bacall's acting panned by critics. To capitalize on the "Bogie and Bacall" phenomenon that had developed, Bacall's agent Charles K. Feldman asked the studio to re-shoot scenes for The Big Sleep. Warner agreed, and these scenes were shot in early January 1946. Julius Epstein wrote the reshoots, but he was not given a credit.

Although only about twenty minutes of the film's original 1945 cut was removed and replaced, twenty minutes was either condensed, altered, or eliminated with new footage. For example, in the 1945 cut, Marlowe explores Geiger's house, where he does not in the 1946 release. A new sequence of Marlowe and Vivian meeting in a restaurant was also added, replacing a ten-minute sequence of them meeting at the District Attorney's office, and Vivian coming to Marlowe's office a second time. A number of actors from the first cut did not appear in the second cut. Pat Clark was initially cast as Mona Mars. However, Clark was unavailable when her scenes were reshot in January 1946. Peggy Knudsen was cast to replace her. James Flavin and Thomas E. Jackson were cast as Police Captain Cronjager and District Attorney Wade. However, they did not appear in the 1946 cut of the film when their scene – set in the District Attorney's office – was removed.

== 1997 release of the 1945 original cut ==
In the mid-1990s, the original 1945 cut was found in the UCLA Film and Television Archive. It was discovered that this version had been released to the military to show to troops in the South Pacific. Upon learning of this, numerous benefactors, such as American magazine publisher Hugh Hefner and Turner Classic Movies, raised the money to pay for its restoration. The original version of The Big Sleep was released in art-house cinemas in 1997 for a short exhibition run along with a comparative documentary about the cinematic and content differences between the 1945 cut and 1946 release.

== Reception ==
The Big Sleep premiered in New York City on August 23, 1946, before being released on August 31. According to Warner Bros. records, the film cost $1.6 million to produce, and earned $3,493,000 domestically and $1,375,000 foreign.

=== Critical response ===
==== Contemporary reviews ====
At the time of its 1946 release, Bosley Crowther said the film leaves the viewer "confused and dissatisfied", points out that Bacall is a "dangerous looking female" ..."who still hasn't learned to act" and notes:

The Big Sleep is one of those pictures in which so many cryptic things occur amid so much involved and devious plotting that the mind becomes utterly confused. And, to make it more aggravating, the brilliant detective in the case is continuously making shrewd deductions which he stubbornly keeps to himself. What with two interlocking mysteries and a great many characters involved, the complex of blackmail and murder soon becomes a web of utter bafflement. Unfortunately, the cunning script-writers have done little to clear it at the end.

Time film critic James Agee called the film "wakeful fare for folks who don't care what is going on, or why, so long as the talk is hard and the action harder" but insists that "the plot's crazily mystifying, nightmare blur is an asset, and only one of many"; it calls Bogart "by far the strongest" of its assets and says Hawks, "even on the chaste screen...manages to get down a good deal of the glamorous tawdriness of big-city low life, discreetly laced with hints of dope addiction, voyeurism and fornication" and characterizing Lauren Bacall's role as "an adolescent cougar".

==== Modern reviews ====
In 1989, Leslie Halliwell gave it three of four stars, stating, "Inextricably complicated, moody thriller ... The film is nevertheless vastly enjoyable along the way for its slangy script, star performances and outbursts of violence, suspense and sheer fun."

In 1991, Pauline Kael called it a " ...witty, incredibly complicated thriller ...it's the dialogue and the entertaining qualities of the individual sequences that make this movie...The characters are a collection of sophisticated monsters ... "

Film historian Lee Pfeiffer wrote in 2006, "Given the tortured history of bringing Raymond Chandler's novel to the screen, it's somewhat amazing The Big Sleep turned out to be ... a genuine classic."

==== Comparison of the 1945 original cut and 1946 release ====
Between the 1945 cut and the 1946 release, critics have become divided as to which version is superior. Some consider the 1945 cut to be the better, partly due to the inclusion of a scene at the District Attorney's office where the facts of the case thus far are laid out. Others consider the 1946 release to be the better due to its focusing more on the Bogart-Bacall pairing. Chandler praised Martha Vickers' performance in the original 1945 cut, feeling that she overshadowed Bacall's performance. He felt that the deletion of many of her scenes in the 1946 release was done to enhance Bacall's performance.

Film critic Roger Ebert, who described the movie in 1997 as being about the "process of a criminal investigation, not its results", preferred the 1946 version and said,

The new scenes [of the 1946 version] add a charge to the film that was missing in the 1945 version; this is a case where "studio interference" was exactly the right thing. The only reason to see the earlier version is to go behind the scenes, to learn how the tone and impact of a movie can be altered with just a few scenes... As for the 1946 version that we have been watching all of these years, it is one of the great films noir, a black-and-white symphony that exactly reproduces Chandler's ability, on the page, to find a tone of voice that keeps its distance, and yet is wry and humorous and cares.

In a 1997 review, Eric Brace of The Washington Post wrote that the 1945 original had a "slightly slower pace than the one released a year later and a touch less zingy interplay between Bogart and Bacall, but it's still an unqualified masterpiece".

=== Accolades ===
In 2003, AFI named Philip Marlowe the 32nd greatest hero in film. The film placed 202nd on the 2012 Sight & Sound critics' poll of the greatest films ever made and also received two directors' votes.

Roger Ebert included the film in his list of "Great Movies" and wrote, "Working from Chandler's original words and adding spins of their own, the writers (William Faulkner, Jules Furthman and Leigh Brackett) wrote one of the most quotable of screenplays: it's unusual to find yourself laughing in a movie not because something is funny but because it's so wickedly clever."

== Home media ==
A region-1 (U.S. and Canada) DVD version of The Big Sleep was released in 2000. It is a double-sided, single-layer disc; with the 1946 theatrical version on side-A (114 m), and the 1945 version (116 m) on side-B. The 1946 opening credits appear on both versions, including Peggy Knudsen, who never appears in the original version. Nowhere is the original actress, Pat Clark, ever credited. The DVD also contains a 16-minute, edited version of the 1997 documentary comparing the two versions that is narrated by Robert Gitt, who worked on the restoration of the 1945 version. Film critic Walter Chaw writes of the DVD releases of The Big Sleep and To Have and Have Not (1944), "The fullscreen transfer of The Big Sleep is generally good but, again, not crystalline, though the grain that afflicts the earlier picture is blissfully absent. Shadow detail is strong – important given that The Big Sleep is oneiric – and while the brightness seems uneven, it's not enough to be terribly distracting. The DD 1.0 audio is just fine."

The Big Sleep was released on Blu-ray in 2015, including both the 1945 and 1946 cuts in one package.
