= Blue Eyed Girl =

American drama film

- Theatrical release poster
- Directed by: J. Mills Goodloe
- Screenplay by: Marisa Coughlan
- Produced by: Conroy Kanter; Stephen Wallace; Bianca Goodloe; Louise Spinner; Jeremy Alter; Marisa Coughlan
- Starring: Beau Bridges; Marisa Coughlan; Bridey Elliott; Eliza Coupe; Sam Trammell; Freddy Rodriguez; LisaGay Hamilton
- Production companies: KK Ranch Productions; Lucky 13 Productions; CCandME Productions
- Distributed by: Quiver Distribution
- Release date: November 21, 2025
- Running time: 97 minutes
- Country: United States
- Language: English

Blue Eyed Girl is a 2025 film directed by J. Mills Goodloe, starring and written by Marisa Coughlan and co-starring Beau Bridges and Bridey Elliott.

The film was released on November 21, 2025.

== Plot ==
Jane is an LA-based actress who is a married mother of two when she returns to her suburban Minnesotan home town in order to visit her charming but ailing dad.

== Cast ==
- Marisa Coughlan as Jane Messina
- Beau Bridges as Jack, Jane's father
- Bridey Elliott as Cici
- Eliza Coupe as Alex
- Sam Trammell as Harrison
- Freddy Rodriguez as Cal
- LisaGay Hamilton as Calley
- Ashley Jones as Abby

== Production ==
=== Development ===
Coughlan wrote the screenplay as a semi-autobiographical project inspired by her relationship with her father and her experiences returning to her hometown. She has stated that the script was initially written in a stream-of-consciousness manner without a formal outline and began as a personal exercise before being shared more widely. Director J. Mills Goodloe became involved after reading the script and encouraged its development into a feature film.

=== Casting ===
After being cast Beau Bridges described the script as a “beautifully done piece of work". The cast also includes Sam Trammel, Freddy Rodriguez, and Lisa Gay Hamilton.

=== Filming ===
Filming took place in the Minneapolis–Saint Paul, twin cities area of Minnesota in October and November 2022.

== Release ==
In October 2025, Quiver Distribution acquired the film, retitling Days When the Rains Came (a reference to a line in Van Morrison's "Brown Eyed Girl") to Blue Eyed Girl and was released on November 21, 2025.
