= Bury Me Dead =

1947 film by Bernard Vorhaus

- Theatrical release poster
- Directed by: Bernard Vorhaus
- Screenplay by: Dwight V. Babcock; Karen DeWolf
- Based on: the radio drama by Irene Winston
- Produced by: Charles F. Reisner; Benjamin Stoloff (in charge of production)
- Starring: Cathy O'Donnell; June Lockhart; Hugh Beaumont; Mark Daniels
- Cinematography: John Alton
- Edited by: W. Donn Hayes
- Music by: Emil Cadkin
- Production companies: Ben Stoloff Productions; Producers Releasing Corporation
- Distributed by: Eagle-Lion Films
- Release date: October 18, 1947 (United States)
- Running time: 68 minutes
- Country: United States
- Language: English

Bury Me Dead is a 1947 American film noir comedy directed by Bernard Vorhaus. The drama features Cathy O'Donnell, June Lockhart, Hugh Beaumont and Mark Daniels.

== Plot ==
When the remains of a woman's body are found after a fire consumes the stables on the estate of wealthy Barbara Carlin, it is assumed to be her, especially since she was wearing Barbara's diamond necklace. However, after the funeral, Barbara secretly contacts Michael Dunn, the family lawyer. He advises her to notify the police immediately, but she suspects someone is trying to murder her and wants to investigate first.

A series of flashbacks reveals the possible motives of several suspects. The prime suspect is her irresponsible, philandering husband, Rod, whom she is reluctantly divorcing; he might want her wealth. But there is also Rusty, a resentful young woman who had been raised to believe she was Barbara's younger sister. When Barbara's father died, his will revealed that Rusty was just an orphan he had raised, but not legally adopted; Barbara inherited everything. Barbara was quite willing to share everything with her, but Rusty accepted only a small allowance. Rusty, it also turns out, is in love with Rod and (mistakenly) believes he loves her. And who is the woman buried under Barbara's name?

Another flashback reveals that Rusty, a minor, had taken up with a dimwitted boxer named George Mandley. When Barbara went to take her home, Rod had become openly attracted to George's shapely "assistant", Helen Lawrence. Barbara began seeing George to retaliate. Rusty bitterly resented Barbara taking George away from her. Eventually, it is realized that the dead woman is Helen. (Rod had let her try on Barbara's necklace and forgotten to get it back.)

More revelations follow. Helen, George's scheming girlfriend, had gotten him to date Barbara while she herself was seeing Rod. She hinted to Rod that he should kill his wife and marry her. That failed, as Rod actually loved Barbara, leaving Helen to plot to extort money out of Barbara through George. Meanwhile, Rusty, still certain that Rod loves her, boasts to him that her schemes had driven him and Barbara apart.

After the power goes out in her mansion that night, Barbara is attacked by an unknown assailant in the dark. The attacker flees before finishing the job. Rod and Jeffers, their butler, show up shortly afterward, followed by Michael. Rod is taken in by the police for questioning, during which he is asked to telephone Michael for information about any insurance policies on Barbara's life. When Michael's secretary mentions that he has not been in the office all day, Rod remembers that he claimed to have received Rod's message about the latest attack. He insists that the police take him back to the mansion as quickly as possible. Meanwhile, Michael realizes he has blundered, telling Barbara that Helen was murdered with a hammer, something only the killer would know. When Rusty shows up, he decides to stage Rusty and Barbara as a murder-suicide, but is gunned down by the police just in time.

== Cast ==
- Cathy O'Donnell as Rusty
- June Lockhart as Barbara Carlin
- Hugh Beaumont as Michael Dunn
- Mark Daniels as Rod Carlin
- Greg McClure as George Mandley
- Milton Parsons as Jeffers, the butler
- Virginia Farmer as Mrs. Haskins, the housekeeper
- Sonia Darrin as Helen Lawrence
- Cliff Clark as Detective Archer

== Reception ==
Leonard Maltin gave the film three out of five stars praising John Alton's cinematography but criticized the "talky treatment and abundance of light comedy" on an otherwise intriguing premise.
