= How to Work a Room =

1988 book by Susan RoAne

How to Work a Room: The Ultimate Guide to Making Lasting Connections In Person and Online
- Author: Susan RoAne
- Language: English
- Publication date: 1988
- Publication place: United States
- Media type: Print

How to Work a Room: The Ultimate Guide to Making Lasting Connections In Person and Online is a self-help book by Susan RoAne. It was first published in 1988 as How to Work a Room: A Guide to Successfully Managing the Mingling.

== Background ==
It is a guidebook on how to socialize at parties and other events, oriented towards the business community. The 25th Anniversary edition was published in 2013 by William Morrow Paperbacks. The book has sold over a million copies, and was number one on Book-of-the-Month Club's list of best-selling nonfiction books in 1990. RoAne spent six weeks writing the book.

The book starts by outlining the benefits of socializing, and the problems typically encountered when doing so. It then dismantles these problems one by one while offering practical advice using specific examples. The text is oriented towards business people.

The book has been in print since its publication and has gone through a number of revisions and reprints.

== Reception ==
David Brooks in The Wall Street Journal (1988) wrote a tongue-in-cheek review of the book as a guide for shallow and manipulative people who are otherwise not very interesting but wish to appear so.

Paula Yee Sing-Edwards of Fast Company (2008) wrote that the book was "well written and pertinent" while being a "great read with great communication pointers."
