= Gossip (2000 American film) =

2000 film by Davis Guggenheim

- Theatrical release poster
- Directed by: Davis Guggenheim
- Written by: Gregory Poirier; Theresa Rebeck
- Produced by: Jeffrey Silver; Robert Newmyer
- Starring: James Marsden; Lena Headey; Norman Reedus; Kate Hudson; Marisa Coughlan; Sharon Lawrence; Eric Bogosian; Edward James Olmos; Joshua Jackson
- Cinematography: Andrzej Bartkowiak
- Edited by: Jay Cassidy
- Music by: Graeme Revell
- Production companies: Village Roadshow Pictures; NPV Entertainment; Outlaw Productions
- Distributed by: Warner Bros.
- Release date: April 21, 2000
- Running time: 90 minutes
- Country: United States
- Language: English
- Budget: $24 million
- Box office: $12.6 million

Gossip is a 2000 American teen psychological thriller film directed by Davis Guggenheim, and starring James Marsden, Lena Headey, Norman Reedus, Kate Hudson, Marisa Coughlan and Joshua Jackson. The film follows a trio of college students who decide to start a rumor for a class assignment and track its circulation, but the rumor results in grave consequences and spirals out of control. The film was a box office disappointment and received negative reviews.

== Plot ==
On a Manhattan college campus, Derrick Webb, Travis, and Cathy Jones (referred to as simply "Jones") are students and roommates. Derrick and Jones share an attraction but have not acted on it. Travis is devoted to the wealthy Derrick, as Derrick allows him to live rent-free in his apartment and focus on his art. They all take a Communications class with Professor Goodwin, in which the subject of gossip is brought up. As they enjoy telling lies, the three decide to start a rumor for their final paper and track the results.

At a party, they run into Naomi Preston and her boyfriend, Beau Edson. Jones resents Naomi for her wealth, sense of entitlement, and for allegedly starting a rumor about Jones having slept with Goodwin. While in the bathroom, Derrick witnesses Beau and Naomi kissing in the adjacent room. Beau attempts to have sex with Naomi but is rejected; he leaves, and Naomi passes out. Derrick, Jones, and Travis agree to concoct a rumor that Naomi and Beau had sex. The rumor spreads across campus, changing quickly. Jones writes her paper while Travis turns the rumor into an art installation full of warped photos of Naomi.

Eventually, Naomi hears the rumor herself. Beau denies it, but witnesses remember him seemingly celebrating with his friends. Since Naomi doesn't remember anything, she becomes convinced she was raped by Beau; under the encouragement of her friends, she reports it to the police. As a result, Beau is arrested. Jones feels remorse at the turns of events, but Derrick and Travis convince her to stay quiet.

Jones goes to speak to Naomi and learns that she and Derrick went to the same high school. However, Naomi becomes upset at the mention of Derrick; conversely, Derrick claims not to know Naomi. Jones travels to their old high school and discovers that Derrick and Naomi were formerly a couple. A staff member tells her that Derek raped Naomi after she refused sex with him.

When Jones confronts Derrick, he claims the sex was consensual and that Naomi made up the rape story so her father would not be upset with her. His local reputation then plummeted, and his family disavowed him. He admits to picking Naomi as the target of their "rumor project" as revenge. Jones is horrified, while Travis believes Derrick's story.

Jones tries to confess to the police, but Derrick manipulates the events to make it appear that Jones is in love with Beau, and they do not believe her. Travis refuses to help her, reminding her of everything Derrick has done for them. Beau learns of Derrick's assault on Naomi, and the two engage in a fight. Derrick tricks Beau into thinking they are both victims of Naomi's lies before knocking him unconscious.

Derrick goes to Naomi's dorm and taunts her about the night of the party, revealing that he did this in revenge for her ruining his life. After attacking her, he leaves. The next day, Naomi is pronounced dead from suicide. However, due to Derrick and Naomi's past, the police come to suspect Derrick of killing her. This rumor spreads around campus, and investigators come to his apartment to search for clues. Travis overhears Derrick trying to blame him, using Travis' art as proof. However, the detective seems convinced Derrick is guilty and leaves to get a warrant.

As Derrick packs a bag and prepares to flee, Jones sees Travis buying a gun on the street. She goes to the apartment to warn Derrick, but Travis has arrived there first. In a struggle for the gun, Derrick appears to fatally shoot Jones. In a panic, Derrick tries to convince Travis to take the blame, but Travis refuses. Desperately, Derrick confesses to raping Naomi.

Derrick's confession replays on the recording equipment that Travis surreptitiously set up in the apartment. At this point, Jones stands up, Professor Goodwin enters, and Naomi appears from the other room with Beau. The police are revealed to be Naomi's driver and a student from Jones' Calculus class. The investigation was a setup to trick Derrick into confessing on camera. As everyone abandons Derrick, Goodwin insinuates that he, too, has heard the rumor that he and Jones are having an affair.

== Cast ==
- James Marsden as Derrick Webb
- Lena Headey as Cathy Jones
- Norman Reedus as Travis
- Kate Hudson as Naomi Preston
- Eric Bogosian as Professor Goodwin
- Edward James Olmos as Detective Curtis
- Joshua Jackson as Beau Edson
- Sharon Lawrence as Detective Kelly
- Marisa Coughlan as Sheila
- Novie Edwards as Ms. Waters
- Anthony J. Mifsud as doorman

== Production ==
Kate Hudson and Marisa Coughlan joined the cast in September 1998. Filming took place in Toronto and Uxbridge, Ontario, Canada from October to December 1998.

== Reception ==
=== Critical response ===
On the review aggregator website Rotten Tomatoes, 28% of 67 critics' reviews are positive, with an average rating of 4.5/10. The website's consensus reads: "Gossip drags on far beyond its entertainment value." Metacritic, which uses a weighted average, assigned the film a score of 31 out of 100, based on 21 critics, indicating "generally unfavorable" reviews. Audiences polled by CinemaScore gave the film an average grade of "C" on an A+ to F scale.

The film was criticized for its plot holes and melodrama, but its cinematography and soundtrack were praised. In the San Francisco Examiner, Wesley Morris wrote, "Gossip seems to have been written by a program that selects elements from music videos and girl-in-peril tele-movies to make one particularly off-the-charts ridiculous film."

Roger Ebert of the Chicago Sun-Times liked the movie up until its surprise ending. He said the film looked like it "had something to interesting to say about date rape and gossip", but that the filmmakers cop out with an ending that is "like a sneer at the craft of storytelling". Angus Wolfe Murray of Eye for Film had similar views on the ending, but was more positive and gave it three out of five stars, calling it "one step up from the serial slasher flick" and praising Marsden's screen presence.

=== Box office ===
The film opened at #12 at the North American box office, earning $2.3 million USD in its opening weekend. The film suffered a 59% decline in box office earnings the following week, descending to #17.
