= Bad Lieutenant: Port of Call New Orleans =

2009 film by Werner Herzog

- Theatrical release poster
- Directed by: Werner Herzog
- Screenplay by: William Finkelstein
- Based on: Bad Lieutenant by: Zoë Lund; Abel Ferrara
- Produced by: Edward R. Pressman; John Thompson; Randall Emmett; Stephen Belafonte; Alan Polsky; Gabe Polsky
- Starring: Nicolas Cage; Eva Mendes; Val Kilmer; Alvin 'Xzibit' Joiner
- Cinematography: Peter Zeitlinger
- Edited by: Joe Bini
- Music by: Mark Isham
- Production companies: Millennium Films; Edward R. Pressman Productions; Saturn Films; Polsky Films; Osiris Productions
- Distributed by: First Look Studios
- Release date: November 20, 2009
- Running time: 122 minutes
- Country: United States
- Language: English
- Budget: $25 million
- Box office: $10.6 million

Bad Lieutenant: Port of Call New Orleans (Note: Titled onscreen as The Bad Lieutenant – Port of Call: New Orleans) is a 2009 American black comedy crime drama film directed by Werner Herzog, written by William Finkelstein, and starring Nicolas Cage, Eva Mendes, Val Kilmer, and Alvin 'Xzibit' Joiner. It is the second installment in the Bad Lieutenant film series, serving as a spiritual successor to the 1992 film Bad Lieutenant, and is not a remake according to Herzog. Nonetheless, the director of the original Bad Lieutenant film, Abel Ferrara, expressed dismay that the Herzog film was being made. Both Bad Lieutenant films were produced by Edward R. Pressman.

The film premiered on September 9, 2009, at the 66th Venice International Film Festival where it won the Christopher D. Smithers Foundation Special Award for Herzog. It opened in general release in the United States on November 20, 2009.

== Plot ==
In August 2005, New Orleans police sergeant Terence McDonagh is evacuating a police precinct during Hurricane Katrina. While packing up another officer's locker, he notices paperwork indicating that a prisoner may still be present in the jail, which should have been evacuated due to rising floodwaters. On investigating, he finds a prisoner indeed about to drown; he and his partner, Stevie Pruit, mock the man's predicament and debate waiting for the fire department to do the job, but ultimately McDonagh jumps in to rescue him. He suffers a back injury in the process and is prescribed Vicodin to manage the pain. The department decides to treat the incident as heroic, and McDonagh is given a medal "for extreme valor in the line of duty" and promoted to lieutenant.

Six months later, McDonagh is now not only addicted to painkillers, but is habitually using several other drugs including cocaine and cannabis. His girlfriend Frankie Donnenfeld, a prostitute, also does cocaine and they often share drugs. He has convinced Officer Mundt, a co-worker now in another police division, to bring him drugs sent to the evidence room. He has become estranged from his father Pat, a recovering alcoholic, and his alcoholic stepmother, Genevieve. Over the course of the film, he uses his position as an officer to bully people and steal more drugs.

McDonagh is assigned to investigate the murders of five illegal immigrants from Senegal, who were killed for selling drugs in a gang leader's neighborhood. The gang leader, Big Fate, has two associates: Midget and G. After both are arrested, Big Fate willingly comes to the police station with his lawyer. As they try to gather evidence against Big Fate, McDonagh goes back to a hotel room where he finds Frankie beaten by one of her clients, a seemingly well-connected man named Justin. McDonagh threatens Justin and takes $10,000 from him. Later on, a delivery boy who was an auditory witness of the murder scene goes missing. McDonagh finds the witness's grandmother, who works at a nursing home, and threatens to kill one of her patients to make her divulge where the witness has gone. The old woman has sent him to stay with her family in England, to prevent him from getting involved in gang affairs.

In addition to dealing with the murder investigation, McDonagh gets in trouble with his bookie Ned for not paying his debts. What little money McDonagh has is given to a gangster who works for Justin. The gangster now requests $50,000 - five times the amount stolen from Justin - as compensation, and gives McDonagh two days to get it. As a result of his treatment of the old woman, McDonagh is on modified duty and his gun placed in the evidence room. McDonagh goes to Big Fate and they become partners, with McDonagh supplying Big Fate with police information. McDonagh now has enough money to pay off his debts to his bookie and uses his surplus earnings to place a new bet. During a celebration of the successful partnership between McDonagh and Big Fate, the gangster shows up, demanding his money. McDonagh offers him a cut worth more than $50,000 from a bag filled with pure heroin, but the gangster wants to take it all. Big Fate and his crew end up killing the gangsters.

To further celebrate their partnership, McDonagh implores Big Fate to smoke crack cocaine with his "lucky crack pipe." He does, and McDonagh later plants the pipe at the murder scene of the Senegalese family. The department uses this new evidence to arrest Big Fate and his cronies, but when McDonagh and his partner Stevie are alone with Big Fate, Stevie threatens to kill Big Fate, as part of a ruse to steal his drug money. McDonagh is outraged at this idea and arrests Big Fate, showing that despite his addictions he can still perform his duties as an officer. McDonagh is later promoted to police captain.

One year later, McDonagh appears to be sober, as does Frankie (who is pregnant with McDonagh's child) and McDonagh's parents, but it turns out that McDonagh is still taking heroin. He encounters the prisoner whom he saved at the beginning of the film, and the man, recognizing McDonagh, exclaims that McDonagh saved his life. The man has been sober for almost a year and offers to help McDonagh finally escape his own addiction. McDonagh simply asks, "Do fish have dreams?" The two men in the Aquarium of the Americas then sit on the floor with their backs against a wall-sized fish tank.

== Cast ==
- Nicolas Cage as Lieutenant Terence McDonagh, the titular bad lieutenant
- Eva Mendes as Frankie Donnenfeld, a sex worker and Terence's love interest
- Jennifer Coolidge as Genevieve McDonagh
- Val Kilmer as Detective Stevie Pruit, Terence's Partner
- Brad Dourif as Ned Schoenholtz, Terence's Bookie
- Alvin "Xzibit" Joiner as Donald "Big Fate" Godshaw
- Fairuza Balk as Officer Heidi
- Irma P. Hall as Binnie Rogers
- Tom Bower as Pat McDonagh, Terence's Father
- Michael Shannon as Officer Mundt
- Vondie Curtis-Hall as Captain James Brasser
- Shawn Hatosy as Detective Armand Benoit
- Denzel Whitaker as Daryl
- Shea Whigham as Justin
- Katie Chonacas as Tina
- Lucius Baston as Deshawn "Midget" Hackett
- Tim Bellow as Gary "G" Jenkins
- Sam Velasquez as Jerry "Gremlin" Tennison, Tina's Love Interest (at least before she cheated on him with the protagonist in front of him)
- William M. Finkelstein as Dave Jacobs, a gangster connected to Justin (credited as William Finklestein)

== Production ==
=== Development ===
The film was first announced in May 2008 with Werner Herzog to direct and Nicolas Cage to star. William Finkelstein wrote the script.

Actress Eva Mendes, who starred with Cage in the 2007 film Ghost Rider, joined the cast the following June.

=== Connection to the 1992 film ===
Finkelstein submitted the original draft of the screenplay to Herzog, with the title simply being Bad Lieutenant. Finkelstein was aware of the 1992 Abel Ferrara film of that name, but swore to Herzog that this would not be a remake, and the director insisted on renaming the film to Port of Call New Orleans. The two compromised on the title, settling on Bad Lieutenant: Port of Call New Orleans.

One major change from the original film was moving the setting from New York City to New Orleans. Herzog insists that the film is not a remake, saying, "It only has a corrupt policeman as the central character and that's about it."

At the 81st Academy Awards, Herzog stated that he has never seen Ferrara's film, saying "I haven't seen it, so I can't compare it. It has nothing to do with it." Herzog did not like the idea of a remake and desired to change the title of the film, but was unsuccessful. Herzog stated, "I battled against the title from the first moment on", but added, "I can live with it, I have no problem with it at all. The title is probably a mistake, but so be it."

=== Filming ===
Principal photography began on July 7, 2008, in Louisiana and also around South Mississippi, shooting some scenes at the Hollywood Casino in Bay St. Louis.

== Abel Ferrara's reaction ==
Abel Ferrara, director of the 1992 film, has been quoted by various media outlets as being very angry about the film. After it was first announced, Ferrara was quoted as saying with regard to Cage and Herzog, "I wish these people die in Hell. I hope they're all in the same streetcar, and it blows up." When asked later for his response to Ferrara's statements, Herzog stated that he does not know who Ferrara is, saying "I've never seen a film by him. I have no idea who he is." At a press conference at the Venice Film Festival after the film's premiere, Herzog said of Ferrara, "I would like to meet the man," and "I have a feeling that if we met and talked -- over a bottle of whisky, I should add -- I think we could straighten everything out." In 2018 at Newcastle International Film Festival, Ferrara said that he had eventually met Herzog and had made peace with him.

== Release ==
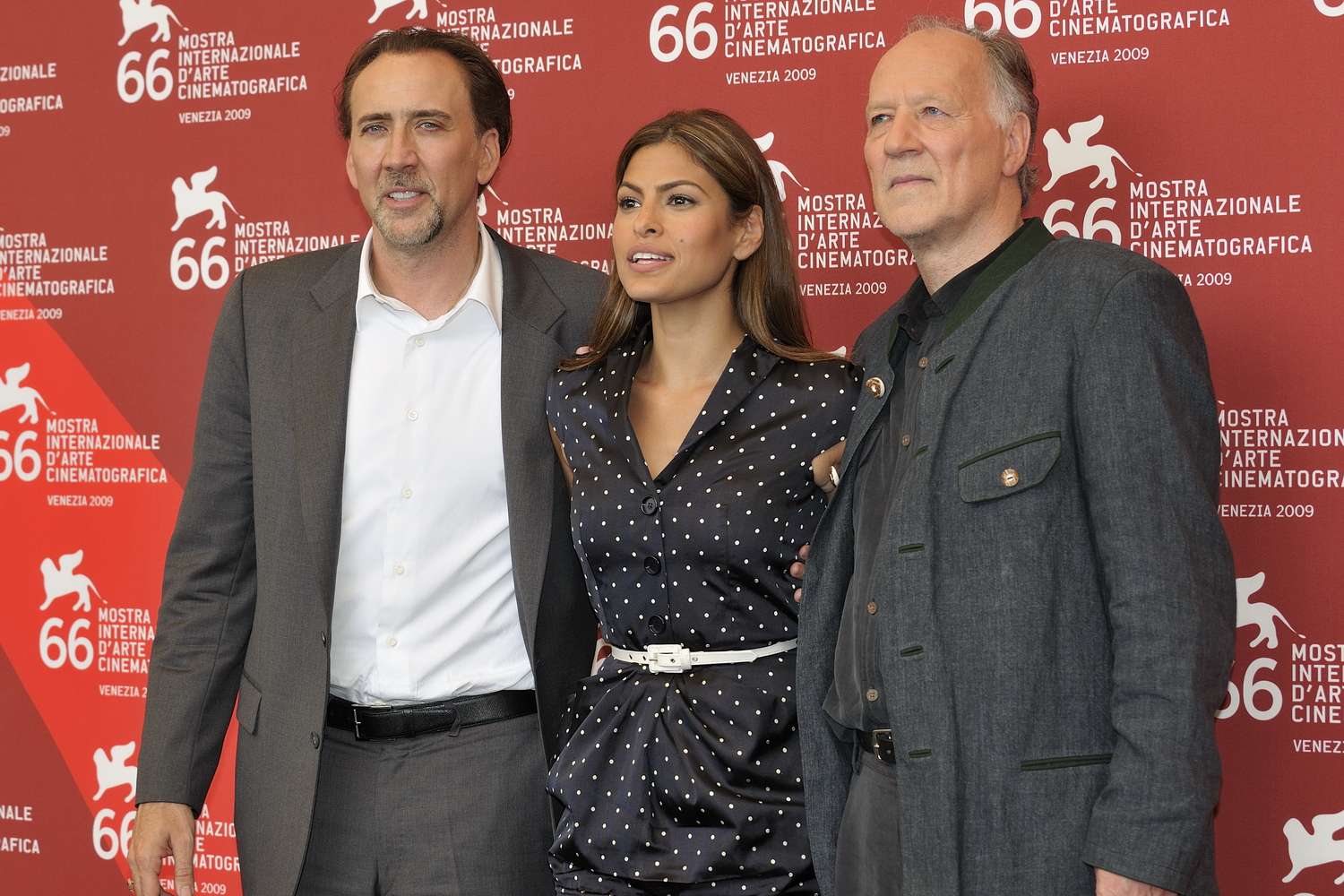
Nicolas Cage, Eva Mendes and Werner Herzog at the Venice Film Festival for the premiere of the film.

Although production on the film was completed in 2008, the film did not quickly find a distributor for a wide release. The film had its world premiere at the 2009 Venice Film Festival, and was also screened at the 2009 Toronto Film Festival and the 2009 Telluride Film Festival.

== Reception ==
=== Box office ===
Bad Lieutenant: Port of Call New Orleans opened theatrically on November 20, 2009, by First Look Studios in 27 venues, earning $245,398 in its opening weekend, ranking number 22 at the box office. The film ended its run on March 4, 2010 with 96 venues being its widest release, having grossed $1,702,112 in the domestic box office and $8,886,990 overseas for a worldwide total of $10,589,102.

=== Critical reception ===
The film received largely positive reviews from critics. Review aggregation website Rotten Tomatoes reports an 86% rating based on 151 reviews, with a rating average of 7.4/10. The site's critics' consensus reads, "Befitting its unorthodox origins, this Bad Lieutenant benefits from Werner Herzog's typically fearless direction and a delightfully unhinged Nicolas Cage in the title role." On Metacritic, the film has a 69 out of 100 rating based on 32 critics.

The Guardian critic Xan Brooks called Cage's work in the film "surely his best performance in years". Blogging about the film from the 2009 Toronto International Film Festival, Roger Ebert declared, "Nicolas Cage is as good as anyone since Klaus Kinski at portraying a man whose head is exploding. It's a hypnotic performance." He also wrote that the film is very different from Abel Ferrara's 1992 film and that "comparisons are pointless". Ebert named the film as among the top 10 best mainstream films of 2009, and then included it in his list of the best films of the decade.

=== As an example of post-irony ===
Matthew Collins, in The Georgetown Voice, has cited the film as an example of post-irony:

The film contains what a Snakes on a Plane-style irony-fest should: hokey plot, bad acting, and deliciously over-the-top glorification of sex and drug use. But the film does much more than revel in its genre’s campy history—The Bad Lieutenant is gorgeously shot and contains pervasive, incisive commentary on everything from race relations to police corruption and the definition of finding success in America.

== Accolades ==
=== Top lists ===
The film appeared on several critics' lists of "best films of 2009", including:

- Roger Ebert: top 10 "mainstream films" of 2009
- Aidil Rusli of The Malaysian Insider: favorite movies from 2009
- The Canadian Press: top 10 films of 2009
- Kim Morgan of The Huffington Post: #2 among top 10 films of 2009
- Stan Hall of The Oregonian: #1 among "foreign language and indie films of 2009"
- Jay Stone of Canwest News Service: #1 best film of 2009
- Les Cahiers du cinéma listed it second on their annual Top Ten of 2010, and also featured the film on the cover of their March 2010 issue.

In some regions, the film was not released until 2010:

- James McMahon of NME: #5 among top 10 films of 2010
- Neil Young of Tribune: #6 among top 10 films of 2010

=== Awards ===
- Venice Film Festival 2009 Golden Lion nomination for Werner Herzog (lost to Samuel Maoz for Lebanon)
- Christopher D. Smithers Foundation Special Award for Werner Herzog
- Independent Spirit Awards 2010 Best Cinematography nomination for Peter Zeitlinger (lost to Roger Deakins for A Serious Man)
- Toronto Film Critics Association 2010 Best Actor award for Nicolas Cage
- Jameson Dublin International Film Festival 2010 Special Jury Prize award

== See also ==
- 2009 in film
- Bad Lieutenant: Tokyo: A standalone sequel to the 1992 film.
