= The Age of Adaline =

2015 American romantic fantasy film directed by Lee Toland Krieger

- Theatrical release poster
- Directed by: Lee Toland Krieger
- Screenplay by: J. Mills Goodloe (Note: Goodloe is credited for the screenplay twice; first as a team with Paskowitz, and again by himself. The two are credited for the story as a team.); Salvador Paskowitz
- Story by: J. Mills Goodloe; Salvador Paskowitz
- Produced by: Sidney Kimmel; Gary Lucchesi; Tom Rosenberg
- Starring: Blake Lively; Michiel Huisman; Kathy Baker; Harrison Ford; Ellen Burstyn
- Cinematography: David Lanzenberg
- Edited by: Melissa Kent
- Music by: Rob Simonsen
- Production companies: Sidney Kimmel Entertainment; Lakeshore Entertainment
- Distributed by: Lionsgate
- Release date: April 24, 2015 (United States)
- Running time: 113 minutes
- Country: United States
- Language: English
- Budget: $25 million
- Box office: $69 million

The Age of Adaline is a 2015 American romantic fantasy film directed by Lee Toland Krieger and written by J. Mills Goodloe and Salvador Paskowitz. The film stars Blake Lively as Adaline, with Michiel Huisman, Harrison Ford, Kathy Baker, Amanda Crew, and Ellen Burstyn.

Narrated by Hugh Ross, the story follows Adaline Bowman, a young woman who stops aging following an accident at the age of twenty-nine.

The film was produced by Sidney Kimmel Entertainment and Lakeshore Entertainment. Principal photography took place in Vancouver from March 5 to May 5, 2014. It premiered in New York City on April 19, 2015, and was cinematically released on April 24 in the United States by Lionsgate. It received mixed reviews from critics, though many praised both Lively's and Ford's performances, citing them as some of their best work in recent years. A modest box-office success, it grossed $69 million worldwide on a $25 million budget. The film received two nominations at the 42nd Saturn Awards, one for Best Fantasy Film and one for Lively for Best Actress.

== Plot ==
Adaline Marie Bowman was born on New Year's Day, 1908, in San Francisco at 12:01 a.m. to Faye and Milton Bowman. In 1929, when she was twenty-one, Adaline married engineer Clarence James Prescott. Three years later, in 1932, they had a daughter named Flemming. Five years later, in 1937, Clarence and nine others were killed during the construction of the Golden Gate Bridge. Ten months after his death, Adaline crashed her car into a ravine while driving to her parents' beach cottage and died in a freezing lake in Sonoma County, but a lightning strike that struck her car revived her. From then on, Adaline stopped aging.

Sixteen years pass and, in 1953, after a traffic violation, a police officer confiscates Adaline's ID and thinks it must be fake, as she is now forty-five but still appears twenty-nine. Adaline moves back to San Francisco and takes a clerical job at a medical school, but finds no information about her condition.

Two FBI agents attempt to abduct Adaline for study. She realizes she must spend the rest of her life on the run, changing her identity every decade. Adaline bids a tearful goodbye to now-adult Flemming, who continues to age, eventually looking older than her mother.

Six decades later, in 2015, under the alias "Jennifer Larson," Adaline meets philanthropist Ellis Jones. She knows she cannot have a normal relationship, but is still drawn to him. Adaline goes along to his parents' 40th wedding anniversary celebration. His father William recognizes her instantly, addressing her as Adaline, but she claims Adaline was her mother, who died six years earlier. They each privately reflect on how they had met and fallen in love decades earlier, and how he had wanted to marry her, only for her to leave him before he could propose.

William is shaken when he notices a scar on her hand from an injury Adaline sustained while they were hiking together. He confronts her, and she admits the truth. William begs her to stay for Ellis's sake, but Adaline instead writes Ellis a note and leaves. Finding the letter, Ellis confronts his father, who refuses to explain.

Driving home, Adaline has a change of heart. She stops and calls Flemming, now old enough to be her grandmother, to say she is tired of running. As she turns around, a flatbed truck collides with her car, pushing it into a ravine. Thrown from the car, Adaline's heart stops due to hypothermia. An ambulance crew revives her with a defibrillator and Adaline wakes up in the hospital with Ellis at her bedside. They profess their love, and she tells him of her 107 years of life and fear of being discovered.

A year later, Ellis and Adaline are leaving for a New Year's Eve party when, in the hallway mirror, she notices a grey hair. When Ellis asks if she is okay, she replies that she is "perfect." A voiceover explains that the jolt from the defibrillator restarted her aging process. Adaline smiles, realizing that she is now able to grow old with Ellis.

== Cast ==
- Blake Lively as Adaline Marie Bowman
- Michiel Huisman as Ellis Jones, Adaline's love interest
- Harrison Ford as William Jones, Ellis' dad and Kathy's husband
  - Anthony Ingruber as young William Jones
- Lynda Boyd as Reagan, Adaline's blind friend
- Ellen Burstyn as Flemming Prescott, Adaline's daughter
  - Cate Richardson as young Flemming (age 20)
  - Izabel Pearce as child Flemming (age 5)
- Kathy Baker as Kathy Jones, Ellis' mom and William's wife
- Amanda Crew as Kikki Jones, Ellis' sister
- Peter J. Gray as Clarence James Prescott, Adaline's late husband and Flemming's dad who died in 1937
- Hugh Ross as Narrator

== Production ==
On May 12, 2010, it was announced that The Age of Adaline would be co-financed and co-produced by Lakeshore Entertainment and Sidney Kimmel Entertainment. Salvador Paskowitz and J. Mills Goodloe wrote the script. Sierra / Affinity has the international rights, while producers were Steve Golin, Alix Madigan, Tom Rosenberg and Gary Lucchesi. On July 20, 2010, it was reported that Andy Tennant was set to direct the film. On October 31, 2010, Summit Entertainment bought the US distribution rights to the film, which was set to begin shooting in March 2011 for an early 2012 release.

On February 22, 2011, it was reported that Gabriele Muccino was in talks to direct the film, replacing Tennant, with the film re-titled from The Age of Adaline to simply Adaline. On May 14, 2012, it was announced that Spanish director Isabel Coixet would direct the film instead. On October 16, 2013, Lee Toland Krieger was reported to be the actual director of the film. Producer Dan Cohen had shown him the script at a general meeting in 2009.

=== Casting ===
On May 12, 2010, Katherine Heigl was cast as the title character. On November 12, 2010, Angela Lansbury was added to the cast as Flemming. On November 15, Heigl withdrew. There were rumors she had been fired by Lakeshore, which both Lakeshore and Heigl denied. She later announced that her withdrawal was a result of her recent adoption of a daughter. On August 15, 2011, TheWrap reported that Natalie Portman had been offered the lead role. On August 25, Portman told Entertainment Weekly she had declined the offer.

On October 16, 2013, Blake Lively and Ellen Burstyn were cast On January 15, 2014, Harrison Ford joined the cast, and the film was set to begin shooting in March. On February 11, 2014, Michiel Huisman joined the cast.

=== Costumes ===
Oscar winner Angus Strathie designed the costumes for the film. The costume designer talked about the importance of the outfits worn by Lively's character Adaline as integral parts of her story, which takes place through several fashion eras.

=== Filming ===
Filming began on March 10, 2014, in Vancouver and continued through May 5. On March 11, 2014, filming at the Hotel Vancouver commenced. Anamorphic lenses and minimal use of steadicams were employed to provide greater authenticity for scenes set in the 1930s, 1940s, and 1950s. The films Gentlemen Prefer Blondes and How to Marry a Millionaire served as inspiration for the period color tone and saturation. In the scenes in which Adaline is walking to the front of the San Francisco Public Library, the exterior shot of the library building was shot at the Vancouver Art Gallery, British Columbia.

=== Music ===
While Rob Simonsen scored the film, Lana Del Rey contributed a song titled "Life Is Beautiful", which is featured in the film's trailer but not included in film, or in the soundtrack album.

==== Soundtrack album ====
Lakeshore Records released a soundtrack album of songs featured in the film, as LKS 34478, on 7 April 2015.

No.	Title	Performer(s)	Length
1.	"Simple Twist of Fate"	Bob Dylan	4:19
2.	"Don’t Watch Me Dancing"	Little Joy	3:35
3.	"Since I Don't Have You"	The Skyliners	2:38
4.	"Drift Dive"	The Antlers	4:49
5.	"Comin' Back to Me"	Jefferson Airplane	5:24
6.	"The Rainbow People"	Dexter Gordon	8:50
7.	"Gimme Some Lovin'"	Sam & Dave	2:59
8.	"I’m Just a Jitterbug"	Ella Fitzgerald & Chick Webb and His Orchestra	3:17
9.	"Tear for You My Dear"	Martin Gibson & Jeromy Allinger	3:28
10.	"Brighter In the Night"	Nancy McCallion	3:42
11.	"Goodnight"	Stephen Lu	3:20
12.	"Auld Lang Syne"	Stephen Lu	2:57
Total length:			52:39

==== Film score album ====
Lakeshore Records also released a score album of music composed by Rob Simonsen, as LKS 34472, on 8 April 2015.

No.	Title	Length
1.	"Adaline Bowman"	1:52
2.	"At Home"	1:59
3.	"January 1st, 1908"	3:57
4.	"First Resurrection"	2:25
5.	"No Scientific Explanation"	1:11
6.	"Never Speak a Word of Her Fate"	3:01
7.	"Ellis Brings Flowers"	2:46
8.	"Sunken Ship"	2:12
9.	"Another Death in the Life"	2:28
10.	"Tired of Running"	1:56
11.	"Adaline Apologizes"	0:57
12.	"Constellations"	2:10
13.	"William Recognizes Adaline"	2:49
14.	"He Named the Comet Della"	1:51
15.	"A Near Miss"	2:55
16.	"The Scar"	2:53
17.	"Twisted Around the Truth"	3:29
18.	"No More Running"	2:02
19.	"Second Resurrection"	3:41
20.	"Coming Back to Life"	1:31
21.	"Hospital Confessions"	5:16
22.	"To a Future with an End"	1:42
23.	"Start Again"	3:28
Total length:		58:20

== Release ==
On August 15, 2014, Lionsgate set the film for a worldwide release on January 23, 2015. Later, the date was moved to April 24, 2015. The film was released on DVD and Blu-ray on September 8, 2015.

=== Marketing ===
The promotional campaign was aimed primarily at fashion-conscious women. Danielle DePalma, executive vice president of digital marketing at Lionsgate, said, "We were very aware of Blake’s high-fashion profile when we crafted the campaign, and there was so much beautiful imagery from the film." They created vignettes for MTV and VH1 and a fashion segment for E! News showing viewers how to achieve the same looks as Lively. They created a custom "Fashion Journey Through the Decades" initiative, through which a fashion influencer from YouTube or Maker Studios created a unique look inspired by the film. Video ads were also released on Instagram and tutorials on Pinterest. Advance screenings for fashion and lifestyle influencers took place in partnership with Gilt City. The application Periscope was used to spread information about the film.

== Reception ==
=== Box office ===
The Age of Adaline earned $42.6 million in North America and $26.4 million in other countries, for a worldwide box office gross of $69 million. The film opened with $575,000 during Thursday late-night showings at 2,100 U.S. theaters. It finished the weekend at number three behind Furious 7 and Paul Blart: Mall Cop 2 with $13.4 million from 2,991 locations.

=== Critical response ===
The Age of Adaline received mixed reviews from critics, although the performances of Blake Lively and Harrison Ford received very positive reviews and were cited as some of their best work during that period of their acting careers. On the review aggregator website Rotten Tomatoes, 55% of 173 critics' reviews are positive, with an average rating of 5.5/10. The website's consensus reads: "The Age of Adaline ruminates on mortality less compellingly than similarly themed films, but is set apart by memorable performances from Blake Lively and Harrison Ford." Metacritic, which uses a weighted average, assigned the film a score of 51 out of 100, based on 31 critics, indicating "mixed or average" reviews. In CinemaScore polls conducted during the opening weekend, cinema audiences gave The Age of Adaline an average grade of "A−" on an A+ to F scale.

Matt Zoller Seitz of RogerEbert.com gave the film three out of four stars, expressing surprise at the film's increase in quality midway through: "I've never seen a less involving movie become so compelling at the exact moment when you've resigned to write it off as just okay." He also gave high praise to Harrison Ford's dramatic performance, writing that "Ford's voice—always deep, lowered an octave by age and one more by William's longing—is even more powerful [than the devastating look on his face]. This is Ford's best performance since The Fugitive, maybe since Witness".

=== Accolades ===
Award	Category	Recipient(s)	Result	Ref(s)
Teen Choice Awards	Choice Movie: Drama		Nominated	
Teen Choice Awards	Choice Movie Actress: Drama	Blake Lively	Nominated	
Teen Choice Awards	Choice Movie: Liplock	Blake Lively and Michiel Huisman	Nominated	
The Joey Awards	Young Actress in a Television	Izabel Pearce	Nominated	
People's Choice Awards	Favorite Dramatic Movie		Nominated	
People's Choice Awards	Favorite Dramatic Movie Actress	Blake Lively	Nominated	
Saturn Awards	Best Fantasy Film		Nominated	
Saturn Awards	Best Actress	Blake Lively	Nominated	
