= Because Mommy Works =

1994 film by Robert Markowitz

- Official release poster
- Starring: Anne Archer; John Heard
- Country of origin: United States
- Original language: English

Original release
- Release: 1994

Because Mommy Works is a 1994 television film directed by Robert Markowitz. It is about a woman named Abby (Anne Archer) who fights with Ted Forman (John Heard) for the custody of their son Willie Forman (Casey Wurzbach). The action takes place in California.

== Premise ==
The film confronts the issue of women being denied custody rights during divorce partly or solely because they work at jobs outside the home, allegedly making them less available as maternal caregivers. It focuses in particular on the added custodial challenge that working women face if their former husband has remarried a woman who does not have a job.

The film was inspired by a true story that appeared in McCall's Magazine in 1992, "Why a Good Mother Lost Custody of her Child" by author Cameron Stauth. The article was about a custody case in Eugene, Oregon, that involved a female teacher who lost custody of her young son, primarily because her husband had remarried a woman who did not work outside the home. Stauth co-produced the film with Anne Archer, and it was written by writer/director Lynn Mamet, sister of writer/director David Mamet.

The issue of working mothers being penalized in custody cases is still being debated in the courts, and is the subject of heated debate among women's rights advocates.

== Cast ==
- Anne Archer as Abby
- John Heard as Ted Forman
- Casey Wurzbach as Willie Forman
- Ashley Crow as Claire Forman
- Tom Amandes as Eric Donovan
- Jenny Gago as Dr. Rita Hernandez
