= The Big Sleep =

1939 novel by Raymond Chandler

- First-edition cover
- Author: Raymond Chandler
- Cover artist: Hans J. Barschel
- Language: English
- Series: Philip Marlowe
- Genre: Hardboiled detective, crime
- Set in: Los Angeles, 1930s
- Publisher: Alfred A. Knopf
- Publication date: 1939
- Publication place: United States
- Pages: 277
- ISBN: 0-394-75827-7
- OCLC: 42659496
- Dewey Decimal: 813/.52 19
- LC Class: PS3505.H3224 B5
- Followed by: Farewell, My Lovely

The Big Sleep is a 1939 hardboiled crime novel by American-British writer Raymond Chandler, the first to feature the detective Philip Marlowe. It has been adapted for film twice, in 1946 and again in 1978. The story is set in Los Angeles.

The story is noted for its complexity, with characters double-crossing one another and secrets being exposed throughout the narrative. The title is a euphemism for death; the final pages of the book refer to a rumination about "sleeping the big sleep".

In 1999, the book was voted 96th of Le Monde's "100 Books of the Century". In 2005, it was included in Time magazine's "List of the 100 Best Novels".

== Plot ==
Philip Marlowe, a heavy-drinking, laconic private investigator in Los Angeles, is called to the home of the wealthy and elderly General Sternwood. He wants Marlowe to deal with an attempt by a bookseller named Arthur Geiger to blackmail his wild young daughter, Carmen. She had previously been blackmailed by a man named Joe Brody. Sternwood mentions that his other, older daughter Vivian is in a loveless marriage with an Irish bootlegger named Rusty Regan, who has disappeared. On Marlowe's way out, Vivian wonders if he was hired to find Regan, but Marlowe will not say.

Marlowe investigates Geiger's bookstore and meets Agnes, the clerk. He determines that the store is an illegal pornography-lending library. He follows Geiger home, stakes out his house and sees Carmen enter. Later, Marlowe hears a scream, followed by gunshots and two cars speeding away. He rushes in to find Geiger dead and Carmen drugged and naked, in front of a camera with no photographic plate. Marlowe takes her home but when he returns, Geiger's body is gone; he quickly leaves. The next day, the police call Marlowe and let him know the Sternwoods' car was found driven off a pier, with their chauffeur, Owen Taylor, dead inside. It appears that Owen was hit on the head before the car entered the water. The police also ask if Marlowe is looking for Regan.

Marlowe stakes out Geiger's bookstore and sees its inventory being moved to Brody's home. Vivian comes to his office and says Carmen is being blackmailed with the nude photos from the previous night. She also mentions gambling at the casino of Eddie Mars and volunteers that Eddie's wife, Mona, ran off with Rusty. Marlowe revisits Geiger's house and finds Carmen trying to get inside. They look for the photos, but she pretends ignorance of the previous night. Eddie suddenly enters; he says he is Geiger's landlord and is looking for him. Eddie demands to know why Marlowe is there; Marlowe takes no notice and states that he is no threat to him.

Marlowe goes to Brody's home and finds him with Agnes, the bookstore clerk. Marlowe tells Brody that he knows they are taking over the bookstore and blackmailing Carmen with the nude photos. Carmen appears with a gun and demands the photos, but Marlowe takes the weapon and makes her leave. He interrogates Brody further and pieces together the story: Geiger was blackmailing Carmen; Owen Taylor did not like this and killed Geiger, taking the film of Carmen. Brody was staking out Geiger's house during the murder and pursued Owen, knocked him out, stole the film and possibly pushed the car off the pier. Suddenly, the doorbell rings and Brody is shot dead; Marlowe gives chase and catches Geiger's male lover, Carol Lundgren, who shot Brody thinking he had killed Geiger. He had also hidden Geiger's body, so he could remove his own belongings before the police learned of the murder.

The case is seemingly over, but Marlowe is nagged by Rusty’s disappearance. The police accept that he simply ran off with Mona, since she is also missing, and since Eddie would not risk committing a murder in which he would be the obvious suspect. Eddie calls Marlowe to his casino and seems to be nonchalant about everything. Vivian is also there, and Marlowe senses something between her and Eddie. Marlowe drives her home and she tries to seduce him, but he rejects her advances. When he gets home, he finds Carmen has crept into his bed, and he rejects her as well.

A man named Harry Jones, Agnes' new partner, approaches Marlowe and offers to tell him Mona's location. Marlowe plans to meet him later, but Eddie’s henchman, Lash Canino, is suspicious of Jones and Agnes' intentions and kills Jones first. Marlowe manages to meet Agnes anyway and receives the information. He goes to the location in Rialto, a repair shop with a home at the back, but Canino jumps him and knocks him out. When Marlowe awakens, he is tied up and Mona is there with him. She says she has not seen Rusty in months; she only hid out to help Eddie and insists he did not kill Rusty. She frees Marlowe, and he shoots and kills Canino.

The next day, Marlowe visits Sternwood, who remains curious about Rusty's whereabouts and offers Marlowe an additional $1,000 if he is able to locate him. On the way out, Marlowe returns Carmen's gun to her, and she asks him to teach her how to shoot. They go to an abandoned field, where she tries to kill him, but he has loaded the gun with blanks and merely laughs at her; the shock causes Carmen to have an epileptic seizure. Marlowe brings her back and tells Vivian he has guessed the truth: Carmen came on to Rusty and he spurned her, so she killed him. Eddie, who had been backing Geiger, helped Vivian conceal the killing by helping to dispose of Rusty's body, inventing a story about his wife running off with Rusty, and then blackmailing her himself. Vivian says she did it to keep it all from her father, so he would not despise his own daughters, and promises to have Carmen institutionalized.

== Background ==
In 1931, Chandler lost his job at the Dabney Oil Syndicate and decided to teach himself fiction writing. (Note: Chandler said he was "intrigued" out of the company. Reflecting on the event that set him on his famed writing career, the editors of The Annotated Big Sleep add, "He later blamed the sacking on the Depression and various conspiracies against him, but in fact he was fired for drunkenness, absenteeism, in-office liaisons, and general erratic behavior. Such stuff as dreams are made on.") He wrote to a friend, "I'm on the threshold of getting the only place I ever wanted with all my heart to get. I'm making a start as a writer." Magazines of the era were divided into higher-end "slicks" and pulp magazines, home to a variety of genre fiction aimed at a mass market. H. L. Mencken and George Jean Nathan had founded the pulp Black Mask in 1920 to offset losses in their "slick", The Smart Set. As the golden age of detective fiction took shape, Chandler saw in Dashiell Hammett's Black Mask stories a path to sustain himself financially and grow as a writer.

=== Drafting ===
Chandler spent five years publishing short detective stories, first in Black Mask and later its competitor Dime Detective. When he set out to write his first novel, The Big Sleep initiated a process he called "cannibalizing" his previous work. Chandler would combine parts of his published short stories and rework them into a coherent novel. For The Big Sleep, the two main stories that form the core of the novel are "Killer in the Rain" (published in 1935) and "The Curtain" (published in 1936). Although the stories were independent and shared no characters, they had some similarities that made it logical to combine them. In both stories there is a powerful father who is distressed by a wayward child. Chandler merged the two fathers into a new character and did the same for the daughter and grandson, resulting in General Sternwood and his wild daughter Carmen. Chandler also borrowed small parts of two other stories, "Finger Man" and "Mandarin's Jade".

This process — especially in a time when cutting and pasting was done by cutting and pasting paper — sometimes produced a plot with a few loose ends. An unanswered question in The Big Sleep is who killed the chauffeur. When Howard Hawks filmed the novel, his writing team was perplexed by that question, in response to which Chandler replied that he had no idea. This exemplifies a difference between Chandler's style of crime fiction and that of previous authors. To Chandler, plot was less important than atmosphere and characterisation. An ending that answered every question while neatly tying every plot thread mattered less to Chandler than interesting characters with believable behaviour.

When Chandler merged his stories into a novel, he spent more effort on expanding descriptions of people, places, and Marlowe's thinking than getting every detail of the plot perfectly consistent. In "The Curtain", the description of Mrs. O'Mara's room is just enough to establish the setting:

This room had a white carpet from wall to wall. Ivory drapes of immense height lay tumbled casually on the white carpet inside the many windows, which stared towards the dark foot-hills. The air beyond the glass was dark too. It had not started to rain, yet there was a feeling of pressure in the atmosphere.

In The Big Sleep, Chandler expanded this description of the room and used new detail (e.g. the contrast of white and "bled out", the coming rain) to foreshadow the fact that Mrs. Regan (Mrs. O'Mara in the original story) is covering up the murder of her husband by her sister and that the coming rainstorm will bring more deaths:

The room was too big, the ceiling was too high, the doors were too tall, and the white carpet that went from wall to wall looked like a fresh fall of snow at Lake Arrowhead. There were full-length mirrors and crystal doodads all over the place. The ivory furniture had chromium on it, and the enormous ivory drapes lay tumbled on the white carpet a yard from the windows. The white made the ivory look dirty and the ivory made the white look bled out. The windows stared towards the darkening foothills. It was going to rain soon. There was pressure in the air already.

Of the historical plausibility of Geiger's character, Jay A. Gertzman wrote:

Erotica dealers with experience had to be tough, although not necessarily predatory, and the business was not for the timid or scrupulous. But the criminality of erotica dealers did not extend beyond bookselling into organized racketeering; Al Capone and Meyer Lansky were not role models. A figure like A. G. Geiger, the dirty-books racketeer in Raymond Chandler's Big Sleep (1939) who supplements his business activities as owner of a pornographic lending library in Hollywood by arranging sex orgies and blackmailing rich customers, is a fascinating but lurid exaggeration. However susceptible film personalities were to blackmail, it was not the métier of book dealers.

Chandler finished his first draft by May 1938. He and his wife moved from Los Angeles to Big Bear Lake, California, in the San Bernardino Mountains, for his health. Disregarding the first draft, he started anew and conceived the character of Philip Marlowe, taking inspiration from Hammett and James M. Cain, author of The Postman Always Rings Twice. Chandler sent his finished manuscript to the literary agent Sydney Sanders, who decided that Alfred A. Knopf was the ideal publisher for The Big Sleep. Having published both Hammett and Cain, Knopf invested in a publicity campaign positioning Chandler as a successor to their work.

=== Setting ===
The Big Sleep takes place in the 1930s, and thus its story was also largely influenced by the very real massive social upheaval during the interwar period. During the harsh 1930s, the American people lost much faith in the government due to their repeated intervention failures, experienced the rise of gang violence from Prohibition, and endured the severe decline of public welfare from disasters such as the Great Depression and Dust Bowl. Chandler himself was fired from his job at an oil company in 1932, which would lead him to begin writing in the grittier and more cynical hard-boiled genre that mirrored the hardships of its time. In American essayist Herbert Ruhm's introduction to the Black Mask, a hard-boiled magazine that Chandler initially wrote for, Ruhm found that: "...the streets of the cities best reflected the moral disorder of the era. Events were depicted in language of these streets; mean, slangy, prejudiced, sometimes witty and always tough."

Through this time of suffering, people began flocking towards big cities such as Los Angeles—also the setting of The Big Sleep—for work, which consequently made cities hotspots for the new meshing of demographic and socioeconomic changes. As a result, roots of modernity and mass culture began to form in America, slowly eroding old social norms such as the traditional views of masculinity and family. This plays heavily into Chandler's depiction of Marlowe as a chivalrous lone wolf of the old guard, futilely trying to change the world around him.

== Adaptations ==
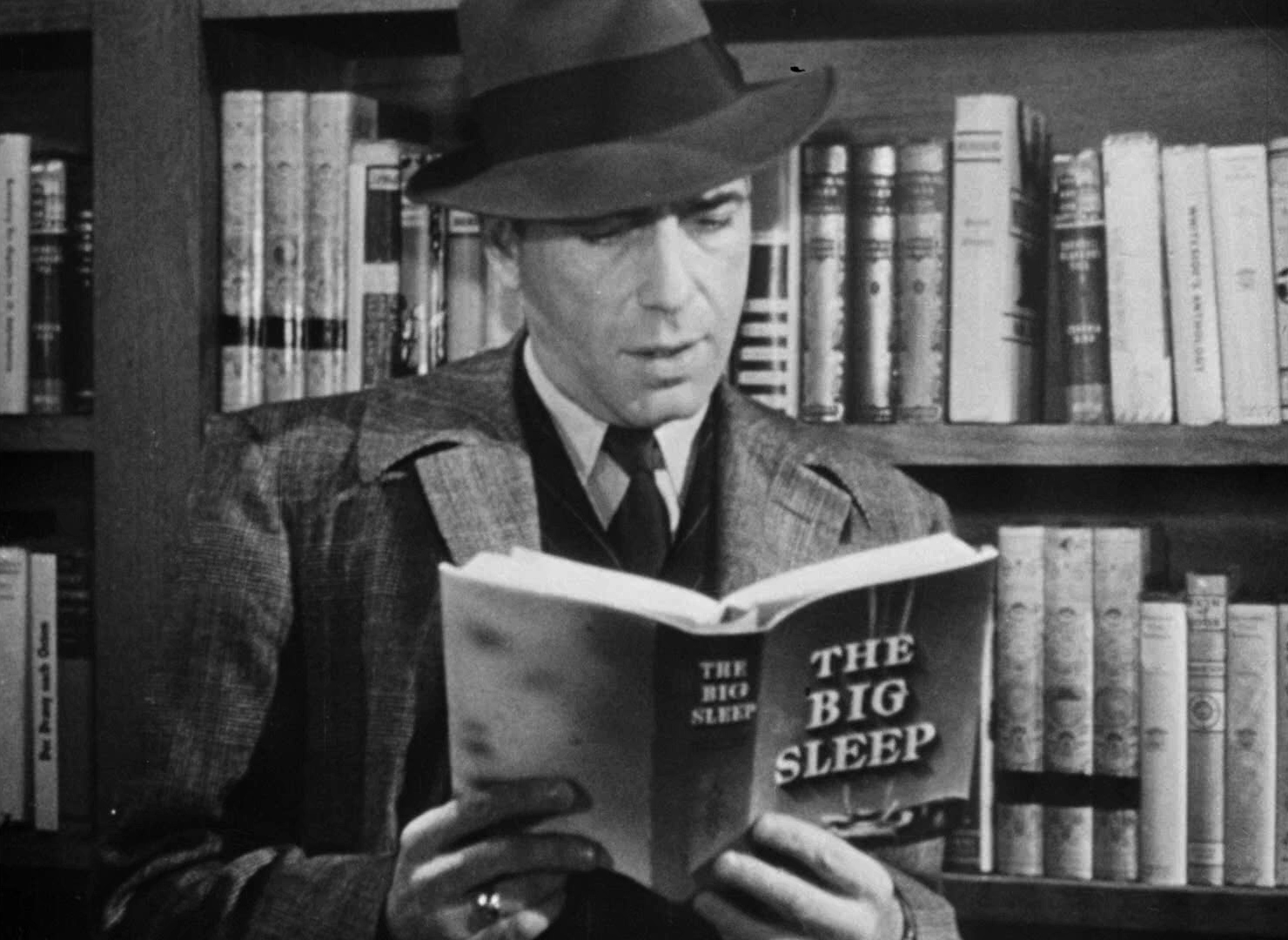
Humphrey Bogart in the trailer for The Big Sleep (1946)

- The Big Sleep, a 1946 film starring Humphrey Bogart and directed by Howard Hawks
- Television adaptation by Richard Morrison, directed by Norman Felton and starring Zachary Scott, broadcast on 25 September 1950
- The Big Sleep, a 1978 film starring Robert Mitchum and directed by Michael Winner
- Adaptation for radio by Bill Morrison, directed by John Tydeman, and broadcast on BBC Radio 4 on 26 September 1977, starring Ed Bishop as Marlowe
- Another adaptation by BBC Radio 4, directed by Claire Grove and broadcast on 5 February 2011, starring Toby Stephens as Marlowe
- Perchance to Dream, Robert B. Parker's authorised 1990 sequel
- The Coen brothers' film The Big Lebowski was inspired by the character Philip Marlowe and the style and plot elements of Chandler's novels such as The Big Sleep.
- The Big Sleep, a stage adaptation by Alvin Rakoff and John D. Rakoff, premièred in October 2011 at The Mill at Sonning, Berkshire, UK. Dan Chameroy played Marlowe.

== Critical reception ==
The Big Sleep was a modest critical success in its first printing. It was included in "roundup" reviews of similar crime novels; Chandler was disappointed that it was treated as competent rather than exceptional. In The New York Times Book Review, Isaac Anderson wrote, "As a study in depravity, the story is excellent, with Marlowe standing out as almost the only fundamentally decent person in it." This review, Chandler wrote, "deflated me pretty thoroughly". The Saturday Review of Literature called it "Hammettic" in reference to Dashiell Hammett's outsize influence on the pulp detective genre. Many reviews mentioned Hammett and Black Mask directly.

By the publication of Chandler's fourth novel, The Lady in the Lake (1943), detective fiction and the author's place within it were being reevaluated. On 14 October 1944, Edmund Wilson published an essay in The New Yorker denouncing the literary merits of Agatha Christie, Hammett, and similar authors. Chandler had written the script for the film Double Indemnity in the intervening years. Bernard DeVoto's response to Wilson in Harper's included the line, "If distinguished prose as such is what Mr. Wilson wants, let him try Mr. Raymond Chandler. In fact, let him try Mr. Chandler on any ground, for he is one of the best mystery writers now practicing, has carried the Hammett subspecies to a distinction its originator never attained, and in a recent movie greatly improved on Mr. Cain's dialogue." The New York Times Book Review ran a much more favourable retrospect of Chandler's first four novels in January 1945: "Chandler indeed can be unreservedly recommended not only to those who like good mystery fiction but also to those who like good novels." Chandler's popularity continued to rise, and by the time of the 1946 film adaptation starring Humphrey Bogart, he was widely known to the public.

Following Chandler's death in 1959, the publication of Raymond Chandler Speaking (1962), a collection of his letters, shaped discourse around his work. Reviewing the collection in The New Republic, Wilson Pollock disagreed with W. H. Auden that Chandler was interested in "serious" writing: "Drugstore literature of the kind he wrote is consumed by juvenile delinquent and dowager alike and Chandler knew it." The Times Literary Supplement, by contrast, praised Chandler's eye for prose and evolution from his "crude" short stories. "It would have taken an extraordinary sensibility to discover in these stories the talent that was immediately evident when his first novel, The Big Sleep, was published." It described Chandler as "probably, with the exception of Agatha Christie, the most famous crime writer in the world" at that time. The Big Sleep became what one biographer called "not Raymond Chandler's favorite of his own novels but it is certainly the most famous", grouped with Hammett's The Maltese Falcon and Cain's Double Indemnity as "the high peak of the hard-boiled genre". A notable criticism came from Ross Macdonald, a fellow crime writer who began writing a decade after Chandler. Macdonald's 1973 essay "The Writer as Detective Hero" criticized Chandler's early work as morally rigid and disagreed with Chandler's de-emphasis on plot. For Macdonald, "the structure must be single, and intended".

On November 5, 2019, BBC News listed The Big Sleep as one of the 100 most influential novels. In a 2014 retrospective, The Guardian ranked it No. 62 on its list of the 100 best novels. The book review site The Pequod rated the book a 9.5 (out of 10.0), saying, "This is one of Raymond Chandler's best books … The real pleasures lie not in the story, but in Chandler's atmospheric settings."
