= Dorian "Doc" Paskowitz =

American physician

- Born: March 3, 1921; Galveston, Texas, U.S.
- Died: November 10, 2014 (aged 93); Newport Beach, California, U.S.
- Education: Stanford University School of Medicine
- Occupations: Doctor, surfer
- Spouse: Juliette Paéz (third wife)
- Children: 11
- Relatives: Sonia Darrin (sister)

Dorian "Doc" Paskowitz (March 3, 1921 – November 10, 2014) was an American surfer and physician, who gave up practicing medicine for a living and decided to become a professional surfer. In 1972, he founded a surf camp run by his family, where campers could live alongside and surf with members of the Paskowitz family. He and his family have been referred to as the "First Family of Surfing".

== Early life ==
Paskowitz was Jewish, and was born March 3, 1921, in Galveston, Texas. He was one of three children born to Russian Jewish emigrants Louis and Rose Paskowitz. His sister is former actress Sonia Darrin. He attended Point Loma High School, San Diego State, Stanford University, and graduated from Stanford Medical School in 1946.

In 1946, he first visited Hawaii, and went surfing with Duke Kahanamoku.

After two failed marriages (including one that resulted in two daughters), he realized that he did not feel happy as a doctor. Paskowitz went to Israel for a year, and found himself happier than he had ever been. He volunteered for the Israeli army in 1956 during the Suez Crisis, but was rejected. He then returned to the United States and focused on surfing full-time.

== The First Family of Surfing ==
After marrying his third wife, Juliette Paez, they began a period of roughly 25 years of a transient bohemian lifestyle on the road. The couple produced nine children: eight sons and a daughter. The entire family lived and traveled together in a succession of used camper vans. His personal philosophy about education and money and healthy lifestyle was imposed on his family.

None of the Paskowitz children were formally educated during their time on the road. Paskowitz's philosophy about the difference between knowledge and wisdom led him to believe that the formal education systems in all the countries of the world were not useful. He believed that achieving wisdom came from real experiences in the world, and from meeting and learning from everyday people. He believed formal education was dangerous to young minds, despite being a Stanford graduate and a professor at community colleges, including Palomar College in San Marcos, California.

A consistent theme of health pervaded Paskowitz's approach to family life. Most mornings, the family ate a breakfast of multi-grain gruel (as one of his children described it), and they were all expected to improve their surfing skills on a daily basis. Several of Paskowitz's children reached a competitive level in surfing, winning contests and earning endorsement income. Son Israel "Izzy" Paskowitz was the U.S. Longboarding Champion in 1989.

Dorian had nine children with Juliette Paskowitz, including son Salvador Paskowitz, who is an American screenwriter and producer, and sons Adam and Josh Paskowitz of the band The Flys.

== Surfing For Peace ==
In August 2007, Paskowitz launched the Surfing For Peace project to deliver surfboards to the small surfing community in Gaza. Paskowitz had to persuade the Israeli government to let him deliver the surfboards because after Hamas took over Gaza in June 2007, Israel has only let in essential humanitarian supplies. Paskowitz founded Surfing For Peace together with his own son David Paskowitz, as well as Arthur Rashovan and Kelly Slater, after reading an article in the Los Angeles Times which highlighted the lack of surfboards in Gaza.

Surfing For Peace worked with OneVoice Movement, a pro Israeli-Palestinian peace organization, to successfully deliver the surfboards and hold a follow-up benefit concert in Tel Aviv in October 2007. The successful surfboard delivery gained international attention for Surfing For Peace and launched a global community of surfers and supporters who aim to use the shared-surfing experience to bridge cultural and political barriers.

== Health guru ==
Paskowitz was described as a health guru and had a strong interest in health issues. He advocated natural diets low in fat accompanied by exercise. Paskowitz wrote a book in 1997 (republished in 2007) on his philosophy about health and other issues titled Surfing and Health.

== Surfwise ==
A documentary film about Paskowitz's family directed by Doug Pray, Surfwise premiered at the Toronto International Film Festival in 2007 and was released in theaters by Magnolia Pictures in 2008. Despite the fact that Paskowitz attended the world premiere and many other screenings, he never actually watched the film. In episode 30 of worldsurfradio.com Paskowitz spoke about his life and the Surfwise documentary.

The film chronicled the lives of the Paskowitz family, and how they lived together for more than two decades, though often in an uneasy atmosphere. The eldest son, David, was 23 when he finally left the family to find his own life. Interviews in the movie with the Paskowitz children revealed many of them held deep resentments about their childhood, from having lost the chance to have an education, to the inappropriate exposure to their parents' sexual activity, to the extensive list of rules imposed upon them by their father. This had resulted in estrangement from their parents for varying periods of time for some of the children, though by the time of the documentary's filming, all of the children had reconciled with their parents.

In June 2010, Variety reported that Sean Penn intended to produce and star in a movie about Dorian Paskowitz.

== Accolades ==
In 2000 he was inducted into the Southern California Jewish Sports Hall of Fame.

== Death ==
Paskowitz died on November 10, 2014, in Newport Beach, California, aged 93. His health had declined following hip surgery earlier in 2014.
