= Salvador Paskowitz =

American screenwriter

Salvador Paskowitz is an American screenwriter and producer. He is one of the nine children of surfer Dorian Paskowitz and his wife, Juliette Paez.

His writing credits include The Age of Adaline. He is executive producing St. Lucy's Home for Girls Raised by Wolves for ABC. He also starred as himself in Surfwise, a documentary about his family.

The seventh son of eight brothers and one sister, Salvador Paskowitz's origins began as part of the Action Sports community, living in Orange County, California, for many years as well as attending classes at The Art Students League of New York City — classically trained in oil on canvas. Later, he owned a graphic design company whose clients included Billabong and Hurley Sportswear. Salvador also published as a teenager Surf Crazed and Wave Warrior comics, which was featured in Surfing Magazine. An avid reader since childhood days of traveling and surfing Salvador turned to screenwriting full-time in 2007.

Salvador is married to Kristin Paskowitz and they have two children. They live in the Los Angeles area.
