= The Big Sleep (Robert Montgomery Presents) =

- Robert Montgomery Presents episode
- Episode no.: Season 2 Episode 2
- Directed by: Norman Felton
- Teleplay by: Richard Morrison
- Based on: The Big Sleep by Raymond Chandler
- Original air date: 25 September 1950
- Running time: 60 mins

"The Big Sleep" is a 1950 American TV play based on the novel by Raymond Chandler. It was an episode of the anthology series Robert Montgomery Presents. Montgomery had played Philip Marlowe previously in Lady in the Lake. Many episodes of the series were adaptations of Hollywood films.

The broadcast was Zachary Scott's first appearance on TV.

== Premise ==
Private detective Philip Marlowe is hired by General Sternwood to keep an eye on troubled daughter.

== Cast ==
- Zachary Scott as Philip Marlowe
- Patricia Gaye as Carmen
- Jan Miner as Vivian
- Herbert Rudley as Eddie Mars
- Sonia Darrin as Agnes
