= Marisa Coughlan =

American actress and writer (born 1974)

- Born: March 17, 1974 (age 52); Saint Paul, Minnesota, U.S.
- Occupations: Actress, writer
- Years active: 1995–present

Marisa Coughlan (/ˈkɒflən/ KOF-lən; born March 17, 1974) is an American actress and writer. Her first prominent role was a lead in Kevin Williamson's Teaching Mrs. Tingle (1999), followed by a role as Officer Ursula Hanson in the comedy Super Troopers (2001) and as Betty in Freddy Got Fingered (2001). She also had a recurring role as Melissa Hughes on the series Boston Legal.

== Early life ==
Coughlan is a native of Saint Paul, Minnesota. She graduated from Breck School in Minneapolis, Minnesota.

== Career ==
Coughlan's first film appearance to gain mainstream attention was in Kevin Williamson's directorial debut Teaching Mrs. Tingle (1999), in which she co-starred alongside Katie Holmes and Helen Mirren. She was cast in the role after reportedly having been rejected for a role on Williamson's series Dawson's Creek. She followed this with a recurring role on the series Wasteland in 1999.

Other films she appeared in included Pumpkin (co-starring with Christina Ricci), a drama about sorority girls; New Suit, a satirical comedy about the inner workings of Hollywood; Super Troopers, playing Officer Ursula Hanson; and Freddy Got Fingered as Betty.

She had a recurring role on the television series Boston Legal as secretary Melissa Hughes in seasons two and three. She appeared in a ouija board segment in an early episode of Beyond Belief: Fact or Fiction which also features in every episode of the show. In 2007, she starred as Jenny McIntyre in Lifetime Television's original series Side Order of Life. In 2008–2009, she appeared on three episodes of the TV show Bones.

Coughlan began writing while she was pregnant and taking time off from acting. She wrote and produced her first pilot, Lost & Found for ABC in 2011. In 2014, she completed writing a comedy based on Peter and Wendy for NBC. In 2016, it was reported by Variety that Fox was developing a comedy series titled Pushing, written by Coughlan and produced by Greg Berlanti.

In 2022, Coughlan wrote and starred opposite Beau Bridges in the independent drama film Days When the Rains Came, which was filmed in Minnesota.

== Personal life ==
After living in Studio City, California, Coughlan sold her home there in 2015.

== Filmography ==
=== Film ===
Year	Film	Role	Notes
1996	Our Son, the Matchmaker	Julie Longwell	
1997	The Sleepwalker Killing	Tanya Lane	
1999	Teaching Mrs. Tingle	Jo Lynn Jordan	
2000	Gossip	Sheila	
2001	Freddy Got Fingered	Betty	
2001	Super Troopers	Ursula Hansen	
2002	Pumpkin	Julie Thurber	
2002	New Suit	Marianne Roxbury	
2003	Criminology 101	Molly	
2003	Dr. Benny	Candy	
2003	Dry Cycle	Ruby	
2003	I Love Your Work	Jane	
2004	Kat Plus One	Kat	
2005	Jake in Progress	Hope	
2006	Wasted	Kelly	
2007	Meet Bill	Laura	
2008	Poundcake	Deborah	also known as The Dissection of Thanksgiving
2008	Already Dead	Sarah Archer	
2014	Space Station 76	Misty	
2018	Super Troopers 2	Chief Ursula Hansen	
2020	Infamous	Janet	
2025	Blue Eyed Girl		Also writer
2026	Super Troopers 3	Chief Ursula Hansen	

=== Television ===
Year	Film	Role	Notes
1995	Step by Step	New Girl 2	Episode: "The Wall"
1995	Weird Science	Barbara	Episode:"Future Bride"
1995	Fist of the North Star	Jenny	Television film
1996	High Society	Dana	Episode: "Nip and Tuck"
1996	The Guilt	Kendall Cornell	Episode: "Dean's Office"
1996	The Burning Zone	Chante Lefort	Episode: "Blood Covenant"
1997	Beyond Belief: Fact or Fiction	Summer	Segment: "The Prophecy" (also show intro sequence on every episode)
1997	Diagnosis Murder	Allison Porter	Episode: "Open and Shut"
1998	The Magnificent Seven	Nora	Episode: "Working Girls"
1999	Wasteland	Dawnie Parker	Main role
2003	The Twilight Zone	April Beech	Episode: "Rewind"
2006	Boston Legal	Melissa Hughes	Recurring role (seasons 2–3); 12 episodes
2006	Masters of Horror	Dina	Episode: "The Damned Thing"
2006	Separated at Worth	Tess	Television film
2007	Side Order of Life	Jenny McIntyre	Main role
2009	Medium	Gabrielle	Episode: "Soul Survivor"
2009	Bones	Special Agent Payton Perotta	3 episodes
2011	Man Up!	Dr. Donna Perkins	Episode: "Men and Their Chickens"
2012	How to Be a Gentleman	Candice	Episode: "How to Share a Relationship"
2019	Legacies	The Keeper	Episode: "Screw Endgame"
