= Cameron Stauth =

American author and journalist (born 1948)

Cameron L. Stauth (born November 23, 1948) is an American author and journalist who is best known for his narrative nonfiction accounts of true stories, and for his medical books.

== Personal life ==
Stauth was raised in Monmouth, Illinois, where he was a student-broadcaster at radio station WRAM, working for several years with play-by-play announcer Joe Tait, who was later inducted as a broadcaster into the National Basketball Association Hall of Fame. Stauth was also a reporter for the Monmouth Review Atlas and the Galesburg Register Mail. He graduated from the University of Illinois College of Media in 1970, and has since resided on the West Coast. He has been married three times and lives in Portland, Oregon.

== Writing career ==
Stauth has written 26 books, more than 100 magazine articles, and the stories for two films. He has been editor-in-chief of three magazines, and was an entertainment industry columnist.

=== Newspaper and magazine reporting ===
In 1970 Stauth worked as a public relations specialist for the University of Illinois Sports Information Department, and as a general assignment reporter for the Rockford Morning Star, while beginning his career as a freelance journalist and author. In 1971, concerned by a friend's illness, Stauth began to research integrative therapies for cancer, and wrote about this approach in a number of magazines. He later served as the public relations director of Santa Maria Hospital in Baja, California, most widely known for treating film star Steve McQueen when the actor sought end-stage treatment there for terminal lung cancer. In the 1980s Stauth co-founded the health-products firm Quantum, Inc., and the nonprofit Cancer Prevention Society. He became Editor of the Journal of the Nutritional Academy in 1979, and Editor of the Journal of Health Science in 1982. He was also a contributing editor on health and healing for Let's Live, and The New Age Journal.

His early non-medical work included being Editor of Eugene, the city magazine of Eugene, Oregon. The small magazine published the early writing of 1986 National Book Award winner Barry Lopez, 1987 National Book Award nominee Randy Shilts, and 1995 National Book Critics Award winner Mikal Gilmore. Eugene also published established authors such as Ken Kesey, Milton Friedman, Paul Krassner, and Norman Cousins. Stauth was also a columnist on the entertainment industry for L.A. Business and California Business. In the 1980s and 1990s, Stauth published articles in The New York Times Magazine, Esquire, People, TV Guide, California, Prevention, Good Housekeeping, McCall's, Sport, Avenue, Inside Sports, American Health, The Saturday Evening Post, Golf Digest, and many other publications.

=== Medical books ===
Stauth's first book, 1981's The New Approach to Cancer, was one of the earliest to describe integrative therapies for cancer patients, and was among the first to present a comprehensive lifestyle program for cancer prevention. Some of the book's concepts were controversial at that time, including the theory that nutrition plays a role in some forms of cancer. Two subsequent books also generated controversy: Brain Longevity, co-authored by Dharma Singh Khalsa, M.D. in 1996, and Healing the New Childhood Epidemics, co-authored by Kenneth Bock, M.D., in 2007. Brain Longevity proposed a multifaceted treatment program for Alzheimer's at a time when the disease was considered to be largely untreatable. Healing the New Childhood Epidemics asserted that in many cases autism is strongly influenced by multiple physical issues, including neurological inflammation, toxicity, nutrient deficits, endocrine imbalance, gastrointestinal disorders, and infection, and that it can be better controlled and sometimes reversed when these issues are resolved. In addition, Stauth modified the theory and nomenclature of the “fight or flight” response, a characterization of the human reaction to stress, originated by Walter Cannon, M.D. Stauth created and described the now widely used phrase and condition referred to as the “fight-flight-freeze” response, presented in several of his books that were written with various coauthors. These books include Brain Longevity, What Happy People Know, and The End of Pain.

Stauth wrote two other medical books with Khalsa, The Pain Cure, which described natural biomedical and mind-body therapies for chronic pain, and Meditation as Medicine, an examination of mental control over illness. Stauth also wrote books about weight management and fitness, including The False Fat Diet, One Body One Life, and 2003's The Starch Blocker Diet, a reprise of his 1982 book The Original Starch Blocker Diet. He also wrote a book on the emerging science of happiness, What Happy People Know, with Dr. Dan Baker.

=== Narrative nonfiction ===
Stauth's first literary nonfiction account of a true story was The Sweeps, written with Mark Christensen, a behind-the-scenes look at the creation of NBC's 1983 prime-time programs, including Cheers and Family Ties. It was followed by The Manhunter, a book about the rise and fall of the U.S. Marshal's Chief of International Operations.

Stauth also wrote two narrative nonfiction books about professional basketball. The Franchise described the 1988–89 season of a National Basketball Association general manager, Jack McCloskey, whose Detroit Pistons won the NBA championship. The Golden Boys was an unauthorized depiction of the 1992 Olympic basketball team, known as the Dream Team.

Stauth's most recent book, "In the Name of God, The True Story of the Fight to Save Children From Faith Healing Homicide,” was published in 2013 by St. Martin's Press, of Macmillan Publishers. It is a finalist for Best Nonfiction Book in the 2015 Oregon Book Awards.

== Films ==
Stauth wrote the story for and was a producer of Because Mommy Works, an NBC-TV film released in 1994. The movie was based on a true story Stauth wrote for McCall's magazine, "Why a Good Mother Lost Custody of Her Child." The article and the film were about a working mother in Oregon who lost custody of her son primarily because she worked outside the home at a time when her ex-husband's current wife did not. The movie, starring Anne Archer and John Heard, helped advance the legal principle that working outside the home should not be recognized as an issue in custody cases.

Stauth also wrote the story for the Lifetime Television film Prison of Secrets, a true story about Lynn Schaffer and other female inmates in Hawaii who were sexually abused by prison authorities. The abuse, including coerced sex and forced prostitution, occurred over many years, and did not end until media accounts triggered a trial in 1992 that resulted in institutional changes in the Hawaiian prison system.

== Bibliography ==
- The New Approach to Cancer (English Brothers Press, 1981)
- The Original Starch Blocker Diet (Dell Publishing Company, 1982)
- Rodale's Encyclopedia of Natural Home Remedies, with Mark Bricklin (Rodale Press, 1982)
- The Starch Blocker Diet and Recipe Book, with Lorraine Stauth (T.S. Vernon and Sons, 1983)
- The Sweeps, with Mark Christensen (William Morrow, 1984)
- The Bio-Factor (Avon Press, and English Brothers Press, 1985)
- The New IRA Handbook (MCI Publishing, 1987)
- The Franchise (William Morrow, 1989)
- The Golden Boys (Pocket Books/Simon & Schuster, 1992)
- The Schoolyard Game: An Anthology of Basketball Writings (Macmillan Publishing Company, 1993)
- The Manhunter (Pocket Books/Simon & Schuster, 1994)
- Brain Longevity, with Dharma Singh Khalsa, M.D. (Warner Books, 1996)
- Leadership Secrets of the Rogue Warrior (for Richard Marcinko, Pocket Books/Simon & Schuster, 1997)
- The Rogue Warrior's Strategy for Success (for Richard Marcinko, Pocket Books/Simon & Schuster, 1998)
- The Pain Cure, with D.S. Khalsa, M.D. (Warner Books, 1999)
- The False Fat Diet, with Elson Haas, M.D. (Ballantine Books, 2000)
- Meditation As Medicine, with D.S. Khalsa, M.D. (Pocket Books/Simon & Schuster, 2001)
- What Happy People Know, with Dan Baker, Ph.D. (Rodale Press, 2002)
- The Starch Blocker Diet, with Steven Rosenblatt, PhD., M.D. (HarperCollins, 2003)
- Happy Healthy Dogs (SierraMed Publishing Company, 2004)
- The NIA Technique (for Debbie and Carlos Rosas, Broadway Books, 2004)
- One Body, One Life, with Gregory Joujon-Roche (Penguin Putnam, 2006)
- Healing the New Childhood Epidemics, with Kenneth Bock, M.D. (Ballantine Books, 2008)
- The End of Pain, with Peter Wehling, M.D., and Christopher Renna, D.O. (Amazon.com Books, 2009)
- In the Name of God (St. Martin's Press, 2013)
- The Code of Trust: An American Counterintelligence Expert's Five Rules to Lead and Succeed, with Robin Dreeke (St. Martin's Press, 2017)
- “Sizing People Up: a Veteran FBI Agent’s User Manual for Behavior Prediction”, with Robin Dreeke (Portfolio/Penguin, 2020)
