= Polsky Films =

- Company type: Film production
- Founders: Alan Polsky; Gabe Polsky
- Headquarters: Los Angeles, California, United States

Polsky Films is a film production company based in Los Angeles, California created by brothers Alan Polsky and Gabe Polsky. Bad Lieutenant: Port of Call New Orleans directed by Werner Herzog and starring Nicolas Cage was Polsky Films first film. They also own the rights to turn the novels Flowers for Algernon, Gun, with Occasional Music, and Butcher's Crossing by John Edward Williams into films and the rights to turn the lives of Albert Einstein and Sigmund Freud into films.

They have announced a biopic on surf legend Dorian Paskowitz that will be co-produced with Sean Penn. Screenwriter Stephen Schiff was hired by Polsky Films to write the script on the film about Albert Einstein.

== Filmography ==
Bad Lieutenant: Port of Call New Orleans
