= Susan RoAne =

American author and speaker

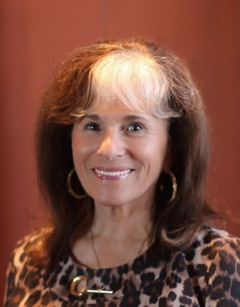
- Born: Chicago
- Education: University of Illinois at Urbana–Champaign
- Occupations: Author, speaker
- Website: www.susanroane.com

Susan RoAne (ca. 1945) is an American author and speaker. She has written several business networking self-help books including How to Work a Room.

== Background ==
RoAne was born Susan Rosenberg in Chicago and graduated from Mather High School in 1963. She has a bachelor's degree from the University of Illinois at Urbana–Champaign (1967) and a master's degree from San Francisco State University.

RoAne's books include How to Work a Room (1988), a self-help guidebook on how to socialize at parties and other events, oriented towards the business community. The 25th Anniversary edition, How To Work a Room: The Ultimate Guide to Making Lasting Connections In Person and Online, was published in 2013 by William Morrow Paperbacks. The book has sold over a million copies, was number one on Book-of-the-Month Club's list of best-selling nonfiction books in 1990 and has been published internationally.

As a keynote speaker, RoAne has spoken to Fortune 20–500 companies, conventions and presented at universities including University of Chicago, Yale University, NYU, Wharton School of Business, UC Berkeley, UCLA and Stanford University.

She has tied the formalization of rules for social networking to the women's movement, explaining that as women moved into the workforce, in particular beginning in the 1970s, they brought domestic networking skills re-applied to the business environment. For example, in 1988, RoAne described a "Scarlett O'Hara Syndrome" prevalent in women aged over 40 who do not initiate conversations because, as Scarlet said, "We haven't been properly introduced." Also in 1988, RoAne said, "I think women are afraid sometimes of being construed as being too forward".

In 2015, she was named as one of the 25 Professional Networking Experts to Watch in 2015.

== Bibliography ==
- RoAne, Susan (2013). How to Work a Room, 25th Anniversary Edition: The Ultimate Guide to Making Lasting Connections—In Person and Online. New York City: William Morrow Paperbacks. ISBN 978-0062295347.
- RoAne, Susan (2008). Face to Face: How to Reclaim the Personal Touch in a Digital World. New York City: Fireside.
- RoAne, Susan (2007). How to Work a Room, Revised Edition: Your Essential Guide to Savvy Socializing. New York City: William Morrow Paperbacks. ISBN 978-0061238673.
- RoAne, Susan (2004). How to Create Your Own Luck: The "You Never Know" Approach to Networking, Taking Chances, and Opening Yourself to Opportunity. New York City: Wiley. ISBN 978-0471612803.
- RoAne, Susan (2003). RoAne's Rules: How to Make the Right Impression: Working the Room, or One-on-One, What to Say and How to Say It. New York City: Macmillan Audio. ISBN 978-1559278508.
- RoAne, Susan (2001). Networking: Beyond the Buzz Word - Biz Books to Go. New York City: Grand Central Publishing.
- RoAne, Susan (2000). How to Work a Room, Fully Revised and Updated: The Ultimate Guide to Savvy Socializing In-Person and On-Line. New York City: Collins. ISBN 0060957859.
- RoAne, Susan (1997). What Do I Say Next?: Talking Your Way to Business and Social Success. New York City: Grand Central Publishing. ISBN 978-0446674263.
- RoAne, Susan (1993). The Secrets of Savvy Networking: How to Make the Best Connections for Business and Personal Success. New York City: Grand Central Publishing. ISBN 978-0446394109.
- RoAne, Susan (1988). How to Work a Room: A Guide to Successfully Managing the Mingling. New York City: SPI Books. ISBN 978-0944007068.
