= Mason Reese =

Restaurateur and former child actor

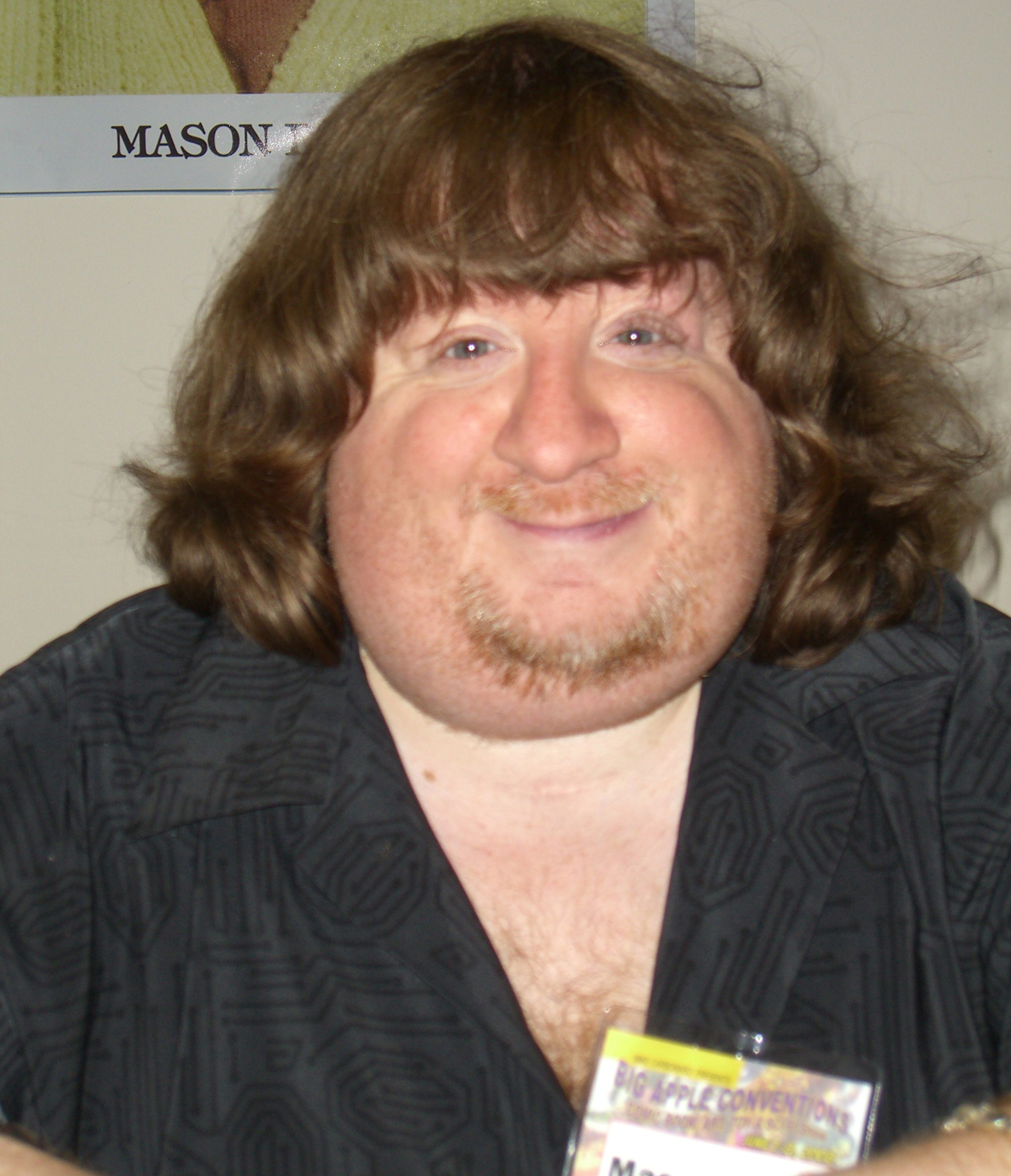
- Reese at the Big Apple Convention in Manhattan, June 8, 2008
- Born: April 11, 1965 (age 60)
- Occupations: Actor; Restaurateur

Mason Reese (born April 11, 1965) is an American former child actor and restaurant entrepreneur who appeared in numerous television commercials in the 1970s, including Underwood Deviled Ham, Ivory Snow, Dunkin' Donuts, and Post Raisin Bran.

== Early life and acting career ==
Mason Reese is the son of William Reese and former actress Sonia Darrin. He attended Saint Michael's Montessori School, a non-denominational elementary school that was housed in St. Michael's Episcopal Church in Manhattan, through the fourth grade. In late 1975, he transferred to the Professional Children's School, also in Manhattan.

Beginning at age four, Reese appeared in television commercials and was known for his red hair and the distinctive, high-pitched voice with which he delivered his lines. The most memorable of these was an ad for Underwood Deviled Ham, in which he humorously mispronounced the word "smorgasbord" as "borgasmord." The commercial garnered Reese a Clio Award for Best Performance by a Male Actor in a Television Commercial. He appeared in over 75 commercials for numerous products, among which were Ivory Snow, Dunkin' Donuts' "Munchkins" donut holes, and Post Raisin Bran.

Throughout the 1970s, Reese appeared in features and interviews on New York's WNBC-TV. He was a guest on numerous television talk shows, most notably The Mike Douglas Show, where he made several appearances and also served as a guest host.

In 1982, he and his mother voiced a series of syndicated, 90-second radio spots titled Mason and Mom, in which they offered lighthearted advice to children's questions, with Reese sharing a child's perspective, while his mother offered an adult's.

At age eight, Reese wrote a memoir, titled The Memoirs of Mason Reese, in cahoots with Lynn Haney (1974), joking to a Washington Post interviewer in 1982, "Oh yes, I think my second volume should be out any day now."

== Post-acting career ==
After retiring from acting Reese became a restaurateur with multiple businesses in the New York City area. He owned Paladar, a now-defunct Pan-Latino restaurant located in Manhattan's Lower East Side. He then opened Destination Bar and Grille located on Avenue A in the East Village, which is also now closed. He opened a sports bar called The Luxury Box, which closed in 2015.

Reese starred as himself in the 1990 short film Whatever Happened to Mason Reese, the first film directed by Brett Ratner. Reese quit the project after one of his co-stars broke his leg during filming. Since looping was required, Reese was voiced in the film by actor Anthony Michael Hall.

== Personal life ==
As of May 1982, Reese lived in Midtown Manhattan. As of June 2019, he is still living in New York.

In 2019, Reese and adult model Sarah Russi confirmed that they were dating. In July 2022, The Sunday Times reported that they had broken up after three years together.
