= Surfwise =

2007 documentary

Surfwise is a 2007 American documentary film about the 11-member Doc Paskowitz family, which was directed by Doug Pray. The film premiered at the Toronto International Film Festival on 11 September 2007 and had its U.S. premiere on 9 May 2008. Paskowitz went to Stanford University Medical School, became an M.D., and espoused a philosophy of holistic health and diet, while raising his large family of eight boys and one girl in a camper with his wife Juliette Paskowitz, and founding a school of surfing.

== Critical reception ==
The film appeared on some critics' top ten lists of the best films of 2008. Noel Murray of The A.V. Club named it the 6th best film of 2008, and Tasha Robinson of The A.V. Club named it the 7th best film of 2008. The film received overwhelmingly positive reviews,, holding 98% on Rotten Tomatoes. Men’s Journal lists it as one of the best surf films of all time - second only to The Endless Summer.

The film's soundtrack is an original composition by John Dragonetti of The Submarines.
