= Sonia Darrin =

American film actress (1924–2020)

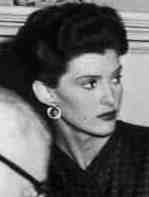
- Darrin in an on-set photo taken during filming of The Big Sleep (1946)
- Born: Sonia Paskowitz; June 16, 1924; Galveston, Texas, U.S.
- Died: July 19, 2020 (aged 96); New York City, U.S.
- Occupation: Actress
- Years active: 1941–1950s
- Spouses: Sidney Sircus (m. 1951; ann. 1952) Jacob Aronov (m. 1954, divorced) Bill Reese (div. 1979)
- Children: 4 (including Mason Reese)

Sonia Darrin (born Sonia Paskowitz; June 16, 1924 – July 19, 2020) was an American film actress, best known for her role as Agnes Lowzier in The Big Sleep (1946).

== Early years ==
Darrin was born to Louis and Rose Paskowitz, the New York-born off-spring of Jewish emigrants from Russia, who lived in Galveston, Texas. She had two brothers, Adrian and Dorian. Her father operated a clothing store in Galveston. Around 1940, the family moved to Los Angeles, California.

== Career ==
The family lived in San Diego for a period, during which her dancing teacher was Adolph Bolm. When Bolm was asked to choreograph The Corsican Brothers (1941), he used the entire class. This led Darrin to be interviewed by LeRoy Prinz, the dancing director at Warner Brothers, leading to a small role in The Hard Way (1943). She also danced in the film Lady in the Dark (1944).

Darrin's best known role was that of femme fatale Agnes Lowzier in Howard Hawks's film The Big Sleep (1946), in which she plays a paramour of minor Los Angeles gangster Joe Brody (played by Louis Jean Heydt). Notwithstanding several scenes in which Agnes trades quips with Humphrey Bogart's character, Darrin received no onscreen credit for her work in The Big Sleep; this despite the fact that she had already been credited by The New York Times in a captioned promotional photo published five days before the film's opening, and had been the guest of honor at a promotional event held on August 14 at the Pelham Heath Inn in the Bronx, (presumably organized by her agent Arthur Pine, who also represented the venue). Darrin learned years later that this snub had resulted from a heated dispute between Pine and studio chief Jack Warner. On October 18, less than 2 months after the film's premiere, the New York Daily News reported that Darrin and Pine had collaborated on an unofficial Big Sleep tie-in song, which was set to premiere the following day on a live broadcast on WOR. Pine's best efforts notwithstanding, neither this broadcast nor the August 14 dinner appears to have had any appreciable effect on Darrin's lack of recognition. (Note: Indeed, one could argue Darrin would have been better served simply seeking out her six-year-old self and the good luck emblem/party favor once fashioned for a fellow Galvestonian.)

Several years later, Darrin did finally receive an onscreen credit for her signature performance, when she recreated the role of Agnes in a television adaptation which aired on September 25, 1950, on Robert Montgomery Presents. She also worked with Ed Wynn and Alan Young on their early television programs.

== Personal life ==
All three of Darrin's marriages ended via either annulment or divorce: the first, to dentist Sidney Sircus, lasted 19 months. She later wed plastic surgeon Jacob Aronoff—the father of her three eldest children (two sons and a daughter)—and theatrical designer/marketing services company president William "Bill" Reese, with whom she parented the former child actor Mason Reese. Darrin's final two public appearances were on The Mike Douglas Show in the 1970s (as Sonia Reese), and in a documentary film about her brother, Dorian, in 2007.

She resided on the Upper West Side of Manhattan for over 50 years. Darrin died of natural causes in New York City on July 19, 2020, at the age of 96. She was the last surviving cast member of The Big Sleep. (The last credited member of the cast to pass away was Dorothy Malone who died in January 2018.)

== Filmography ==
Year	Title	Role	Notes
1941	It Started with Eve	Nightclub Patron	Uncredited
1941	The Corsican Brothers	Opera Spectator	Uncredited
1942	My Gal Sal	Chorus Girl	Uncredited
1943	The Hard Way	Chorus Girl	Uncredited
1943	Frankenstein Meets the Wolf Man	Villager at Festival	Uncredited
1943	The North Star	Dancing Peasant	Uncredited
1944	Lady in the Dark	Office Girl	Uncredited
1946	The Big Sleep	Agnes Lowzier	Uncredited
1947	Bury Me Dead	Helen Lawrence	
1948	I, Jane Doe	Nurse	Uncredited
1949	Caught	Miss Chambers	Uncredited
1950	Federal Agent at Large	Mildred	
