= Betty Madigan =

American actress (born 1928)

Betty Madigan (born 1928) is an American former traditional popular singer and actress.

Born in Washington, D.C., Madigan attended Catholic University.

== Career ==
In 1954, Madigan was rated "the newer female vocalist [with] the greatest chance to become one of the top female vocalist names" in a poll of disc jockeys conducted by Billboard. That year, she appeared on The Red Skelton Hour, The Dave Garroway Show, and The Colgate Comedy Hour. In 1956, she portrayed Martha Cratchitt in a 1956 episode of The Alcoa Hour called "The Stingiest Man in Town," a musical adaptation of Charles Dickens' A Christmas Carol. Madigan performed on The Ed Sullivan Show in 1957, and on The Dick Clark Show on 1958.

A description of Madigan in a 1959 issue of Gramophone said that she sounds like Alma Cogan and also resembles her.

In November 2018, Jasmine Records released a two-CD compilation of her singles recorded between 1953 and 1961, totaling 58 songs. Sepia Records also released a CD containing two of her albums, "Am I Blue?" and "The Jerome Kern Songbook"

== Personal life ==
Madigan lives in Bal Harbour, Florida, where she is socially active.

== Hit records ==
- "Joey" (1954) (peak position on Cash Box No. 22) (released by MGM Records as catalog number 11716, with the flip side "And So I Walked Home")
- "Always You" (1954) (released by MGM Records as catalog number 11812, with the flip side "That Was My Heart You Broke")
- "Dance, Everyone, Dance" (1958) – US Billboard Hot 100 No. 31 (released by Coral Records as catalog number 62007, with the flip side "My Symphony of Love")
