= Alloy Entertainment =

Book packaging and television production unit of Warner Bros. Television Studios

Alloy Entertainment, LLC
- Logo used since 2007
- Type: Subsidiary
- Industry: Book packaging Television studio
- Predecessor: 17th Street Productions
- Founded: 1997; 29 years ago
- Headquarters: New York City, New York, U.S.
- Key people: Leslie Morgenstein (CEO)
- Owner: Skydance Corporation
- Parent: Alloy Digital (2000–2012); Warner Bros. Television Studios (WBTVS Scripted Production) (2012–present)
- Website: alloyentertainment.com

Alloy Entertainment, LLC (formerly Daniel Weiss Associates and 17th Street Productions) is a book packaging and television production unit of WBTVS Scripted Production, which is a division of Warner Bros. Television Studios. It produces books, television series, and feature films.

Alloy Entertainment produces approximately thirty new books a year, which are published globally in more than forty languages. More than eighty of Alloy Entertainment's books have reached The New York Times Best Seller list, including most recently Everything, Everything and The Sun is Also a Star by Nicola Yoon, The Thousandth Floor by Katharine McGee, Max by Jennifer Li Shotz and 99 Days by Katie Cotugno. Past bestselling franchises The Sisterhood of the Traveling Pants, Gossip Girl, The Vampire Diaries, Pretty Little Liars, The Lying Game, The 100, The Clique, The Luxe, and The A-List have sold tens of millions of copies worldwide. Among the television series produced by the company are Privileged, The Vampire Diaries, Gossip Girl, Pretty Little Liars, The Originals, Legacies and The 100.

Additionally, the company produces or co-produces several television shows and films which are novel adaptations.

== History ==
Daniel Weiss Associates was founded in January 1987 as a book packaging company. In 1997, the division 17th Street Productions was created to specialize in young adult fiction.

In January 2000, 17th Street Productions was sold to Alloy, Inc. (later Alloy Digital), and was renamed Alloy Entertainment. Led by Leslie Morgenstein, the division became a frequent partner with publishers and studios to produce film and television adaptations of young adult books.

On June 11, 2012, Alloy Digital's majority owner ZelnickMedia sold Alloy Entertainment to Warner Bros. Television of which it remains owned by the current owner Warner Bros. Discovery.

== Franchises ==
Title	Novels	Films	TV series	Web series	Release dates
The Vampire Diaries Universe	24	—N/a	3	2	1991–2022
The Sisterhood of the Traveling Pants	6	2	—N/a	—N/a	2001–2011
Gossip Girl / The It Girl	29	—N/a	2	1	2002–2023
Samurai Girl (book series)	6	1	1	—N/a	2003–2004
Pretty Little Liars	20	—N/a	4	1	2006–2024

== Filmography ==
=== Films ===
Title	Year	Director	Distributor	Note
The Sisterhood of the Traveling Pants	2005	Ken Kwapis	Warner Bros. Pictures	Co-production with Alcon Entertainment, Di Novi Pictures and Debra Martin Chase Productions
The Sisterhood of the Traveling Pants 2	2008	Sanaa Hamri	Warner Bros. Pictures	Co-production with Alcon Entertainment, Di Novi Pictures and Debra Martin Chase Productions
Sex Drive	2008	Sean Anders	Summit Entertainment	
The Clique	2008	Michael Lembeck	Warner Premiere	Co-production with Bankable Productions
Everything, Everything	2017	Stella Meghie	Warner Bros. Pictures	Co-production with Metro-Goldwyn-Mayer
Good Girls Get High	2018	Laura Terruso	DirecTV Cinema	Co-production with Blue Ribbon Content and Warner Specialty Video Productions
The Sun Is Also a Star	2019	Ry Russo-Young	Warner Bros. Pictures	Co-production with Metro-Goldwyn-Mayer
Work It	2020	Laura Terruso	Netflix	Co-production with AK Worldwide Productions and STX Entertainment
Purple Hearts	2022	Elizabeth Allen Rosenbaum	Netflix	Co-production with Embankment Films
You Are So Not Invited to My Bat Mitzvah	2023	Sammi Cohen	Netflix	Co-production with Happy Madison Productions
Tarot	2024	Spenser Cohen; Anna Halberg	Sony Pictures Releasing	Co-production with Screen Gems and Ground Control
Upcoming
Witness Protection	TBA	Carrie Brownstein	TBA	Co-production with MRC
Frankly in Love	TBA	Unjoo Moon	Paramount Pictures	Co-production with Paramount Players
Untitled Alice in Wonderland musical	TBA	Lorene Scafaria	Universal Pictures	Co-production with At Last Productions and Marc Platt Productions
In a Holidaze	TBA	Tiffany Paulsen	Netflix	

=== Television films ===
Title	Year	Director	Network	Note
Frenemies	2012	Daisy von Scherler Mayer	Disney Channel	With Coin Flip Productions

=== Television series ===
Title	Year	Network	Co-production with
Gossip Girl	2007–2012	The CW	College Hill Pictures/Fake Empire, CBS Television Studios and Warner Bros. Television
Samurai Girl	2008	ABC Family	Space Floor Television and ABC Studios
Privileged	2008–2009	The CW	Tsiporah and Warner Bros. Television
The Vampire Diaries	2009–2017	The CW	Outerbanks Entertainment, CBS Television Studios and Warner Bros. Television
Pretty Little Liars	2010–2017	ABC Family / Freeform	Long Lake Productions, Russian Hill Productions and Warner Horizon Television
Huge	2010	ABC Family	Dooley & Company Productions and Half Full Entertainment
The Nine Lives of Chloe King	2011	ABC Family	Don't Borrow Trouble
The Lying Game	2011–2013	ABC Family	Pratt Enterprises and Warner Horizon Television
The Secret Circle	2011–2012	The CW	Outerbanks Entertainment, CBS Television Studios and Warner Bros. Television
How to Rock	2012	Nickelodeon	On the Emmus and Nickelodeon Productions
666 Park Avenue	2012–2013	ABC	Warner Bros. Television
The Originals	2013–2018	The CW	My So-Called Company, CBS Television Studios and Warner Bros. Television
Ravenswood	2013–2014	ABC Family	Long Lake Productions, Russian Hill Productions, Jardynce & Jarndyce Inc and Warner Horizon Television
The 100	2014–2020	The CW	Bonanza Productions, CBS Television Studios and Warner Bros. Television
Significant Mother	2015	The CW	CBS Television Studios and Warner Bros. Television
You	2018–2025	Lifetime / Netflix	Berlanti Productions, A&E Studios and Warner Horizon Television
Legacies	2018–2022	The CW	My So-Called Company, CBS Television Studios and Warner Bros. Television
Pretty Little Liars: The Perfectionists	2019	Freeform	Long Lake Productions and Warner Horizon Television
Gossip Girl	2021–2023	HBO Max	Fake Empire, Random Acts Productions, CBS Studios and Warner Bros. Television Studios
Pretty Little Liars	2022–2024	HBO Max / Max	Muckle Man Productions and Warner Bros. Television Studios
Upcoming
The Probability of Miracles	TBA	Amazon Prime Video	Warner Bros. Television Studios
The Feminist Karate Union Story	TBA	TBA	Warner Bros. Television Studios
Foster Friends	TBA	CBS	Warner Bros. Television Studios
Pride	TBA	HBO	Warner Bros. Television Studios
Rust Belt News	TBA	CBS	Warner Bros. Television Studios

=== Web series ===
Title	Year	Website
Gossip Girl: Chasing Dorota	2009	The CW
Haute & Bothered	2009–2010	YouTube
Private	2009	Teen
Private: The Casting Call	2009	Teen
The Vampire Diaries: A Darker Truth	2009	The CW
First Day	2010	YouTube
Hollywood is Like High School with Money	2010	YouTube
Talent	2011–2012	YouTube
Talent: The Casting Call	2011	YouTube
First Day 2: First Dance	2011	YouTube
Wendy	2011	Macy's
Dating Rules from My Future Self	2012	YouTube
Pretty Dirty Secrets	2012	ABC Family
The Originals: The Awakening	2014	The CW
Life After First Failure	2017	CW Seed
