= Leslie Morgenstein =

American film producer

Leslie Morgenstein is the President and Founder of Alloy Entertainment, a creator and producer of books, television, and film. The Los Angeles and New York–based production company officially became part of Warner Bros. Television Group in 2012. Morgenstein previously served as President of the company's predecessor, 17th Street Productions, Inc. starting in 1999. He has been credited with facilitating the adaptation of a number of book titles into television series. Examples include Gossip Girl, The Vampire Diaries, Pretty Little Liars, and The 100. Morgenstein has also been involved in feature film projects, credited as an executive producer on the Sisterhood of the Traveling Pants series and as a producer on Netflix's Purple Hearts.

== Early life and education ==
Morgenstein is Jewish. He graduated from Sarah Lawrence College with a degree in Writing and Photography. He also has an MBA in Finance from New York University Stern School of Business and completed his master's work in English and Creative Writing at City College of New York.

== Career ==
Morgenstein produces or executive produces Alloy Entertainment's television series and feature films. He has produced more than twenty series, including current series You, Gossip Girl, and Legacies.

In features, Morgenstein's credits include The Sisterhood of the Traveling Pants I & II, Work It, Everything, Everything, Good Girls Get High, and The Sun Is Also a Star. Morgenstein most recently produced the Netflix film Purple Hearts, based on the Alloy Entertainment novel of the same name. Purple Hearts stars Sofia Carson and Nicholas Galitzine, and is the 8th most popular film on Netflix of all time. It was the first film of 2022 on the platform to break 100 million hours viewed in a single week.

Via Alloy's publishing division, Morgenstein oversees the creation and production of approximately twenty titles a year. The company has had more than eighty New York Times Best Sellers including Everything, Everything, American Royals, The Sisterhood of the Traveling Pants, and Frankly in Love.

== Filmography ==
=== Film ===
| Title | Year | Credited as | | Notes |
| Title | Year | Producer | Executive Producer | Notes |
|---|---|---|---|---|
| The Sisterhood of the Traveling Pants | 2005 | No | Yes | |
| The Sisterhood of the Traveling Pants 2 | 2008 | No | Yes | |
| Sex Drive | 2008 | Yes | No | |
| The Clique | 2008 | Yes | No | |
| Everything, Everything | 2017 | Yes | No | |
| Good Girls Get High | 2018 | Yes | No | |
| The Sun Is Also a Star | 2019 | Yes | No | |
| Work It | 2020 | Yes | No | |
| Purple Hearts | 2022 | Yes | No | |
| You Are So Not Invited to My Bat Mitzvah | 2023 | Yes | No | |
| Tarot | 2024 | Yes | No | |

Key
| † | Denotes films that have not yet been released |

=== Television ===
| Title | Year | Credited as | Network | Notes |
| Title | Year | Executive producer | Network | Notes |
|---|---|---|---|---|
| Gossip Girl | 2007–12 | Yes | The CW | |
| Samurai Girl | 2008 | Yes | ABC Family | Miniseries |
| Privileged | 2008 | Yes | The CW | "Pilot" |
| Private | 2009 | Yes | | Web series |
| The Vampire Diaries | 2009–17 | Yes | The CW | |
| Pretty Little Liars | 2010–17 | Yes | ABC Family; Freeform | |
| Huge | 2010 | Yes | ABC Family | |
| First Day | 2010–11 | Yes | | Web series |
| Hollywood Is Like High School with Money | 2010 | Yes | | Web series |
| Talent | 2011 | Yes | | Web series |
| The Nine Lives of Chloe King | 2011 | Yes | ABC Family | |
| The Lying Game | 2011–13 | Yes | ABC Family | |
| Wendy | 2011 | Yes | | Web series |
| The Secret Circle | 2011–12 | Yes | The CW | |
| Dating Rules from My Future Self | 2012 | Yes | | Web series |
| Frenemies | 2012 | Yes | Disney Channel | Television film |
| How to Rock | 2012 | Yes | Nickelodeon | |
| 666 Park Avenue | 2012–13 | Yes | ABC | |
| The Originals | 2013–18 | Yes | The CW | |
| Ravenswood | 2013–14 | Yes | ABC Family | |
| The 100 | 2014–20 | Yes | The CW | |
| Significant Mother | 2015 | Yes | The CW | |
| Life After First Failure | 2017 | Yes | CW Seed | Web series |
| You | 2018–25 | Yes | Lifetime; Netflix | |
| Legacies | 2018–22 | Yes | The CW | |
| The End of the World As We Know It | 2018 | Yes | The CW | Unaired pilot |
| Pretty Little Liars: The Perfectionists | 2019 | Yes | Freeform | |
| Gossip Girl | 2021–23 | Yes | HBO Max | |
| Pretty Little Liars | 2022–24 | Yes | HBO Max | |

Key
| † | Denotes television series that have not yet been aired |
