= Samurai Girl =

Samurai Girl could refer to:

- Samurai Girl: Real Bout High School, a 13-episode anime series based on a six-volume manga written by Reiji Saiga.
- Samurai Girl (book series), a fictional series by Carrie Asai.
- Samurai Girl (miniseries), a six-hour TV miniseries based on a series of young adult novels starring Jamie Chung.
