= Timotha Lanae =

American singer-songwriter

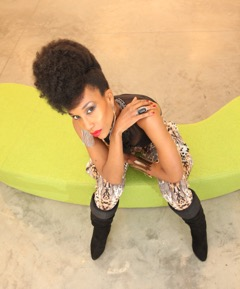

Background information
- Born: Minneapolis, Minnesota
- Genres: R&B, soul, jazz, pop, funk, hip hop
- Occupations: Singer-songwriter; vocal producer; actress; playwright
- Instrument(s): Vocals, piano, keyboards
- Labels: T'La Entertainment, LLC, Savannah Street Music
- Website: Timotha Lanae

Timotha Lanae (pronounced tə-MOTH-ə lə-NAY) is an international and multi-octave singer-songwriter, playwright and actress. Her debut album Red reached #1 on the UK Soul Charts. Her follow-up EP Rewind reached #1 on the Sweet Rhythms Chart and peaked at #2 on the UK Soul Chart. Elements of soul, R&B, funk, jazz, and hip hop can be found in Lanae's music. She cites Marvin Gaye, Maxwell, Sade, The Isley Brothers, Gap Band, and Bonnie Raitt as some of her main influences.

== Early life and education ==
Named after her father Timothy, Lanae was born and raised in Minneapolis, Minnesota, and currently resides in Los Angeles, California. Growing up she could often be found on either the piano or recruiting the local neighborhood kids to participate in her self-produced and directed backyard concerts. Lanae attended the University of Minnesota, where she majored in elementary education with an emphasis in mathematics. Lanae received a scholarship to pursue her master's degree in education at the University of Minnesota; however, because of her passion for creating and experimenting with music she decided to leave her graduate program and pursue her career in music and the arts.

== Music career ==
During her college years, Lanae was regularly performing at some of Minneapolis’ top jazz venues, where she met her mentor Severin Behnen, a jazz pianist and instructor at MacPhail Center for Music. Shortly after leaving her graduate program, Lanae began working closely with international producer Ben Obi at Savannah Street Music. Lanae's debut album Red reached #1 on the UK Soul Charts. Her single "People Pleaser" peaked at number #6 on the UK Soul Charts. Her second project, Rewind, reached #1 on the UK Sweet Rhythms Chart, and was "strongly recommended" by SoulTracks. August 2015 marked her third #1 on the UK Charts for the contribution of her single "8 Days 'Til Spring", to the So Soulful Collection Vol. 2. The So Soulful Collection Vol. 2 was also named “The Best Soul Compilation of the Year” by SoulTracks.

== Theater/acting career ==
After being cast as “Anita” in West Side Story in high school, Lanae has gone on to perform across the globe from the US to Japan. She has toured and performed in productions such as: Joseph and the Amazing Technicolor Dreamcoat, Hello, Dolly! (as Dolly), West Side Story, H.M.S Pinafore, The Producers, Singin’ in the Rain, Ragtime, Footloose, All Shook Up, Swing!, Irving Berlin’s Easter Parade, Beehive, Xanadu, For the Sake of the Children and Johnny Baseball. She was named Outstanding Actress in a Musical by the Minneapolis Star Tribune for her role in Respect: a Musical Journey of Women.

Lanae has also been featured on-camera in TV and film as an actress, singer, spokesperson, and voice over talent. Her work has appeared in film festivals including the Cannes Film Festival. Her credits include: ABC Family: The Nine Lives of Chloe King (music featured: Indigo), Rosie, Soul Survivors, Elmer’s Glue, Best Buy, Target, General Mills, K-Mart, American Idol, The Guthrie Theater Presents: Gilbert and Sullivan’s H.M.S Pinafore on PBS, U Care, Keranique and Once Upon a Child.

== Awards/recognition ==
- "Red": #1 Album-UK Soul Charts
- "Rewind": #1 Album-Sweet Rhythm Charts and #2 Album-UK Soul Charts
- "Jazzy Lady": #1 Fair Trade 4 Music Chart
- "Voting Member for the Grammy Awards"
- "Soultracks" New Artist of the Year Nomination
- "UK Pride Magazine" named “One to Watch”
- "Rosie"-Cannes Film Festival
- "Song-Indigo" featured in The Nine Lives of Chloe King
- "Outstanding Actress in a Musical"-Star Tribune
- "2007 American Idol" (Hollywood Finalist)

=== Albums ===
- Rewind
- Red
- Timotha Lanae-EP

=== Singles ===
- "Open Road-ft. Ryan Liestman"
- "God, Love, Music-Remix"
- "8 Days Til Spring"
- "Who’s that Girl"
- "People Pleaser"
- "Radio" featuring Stokley Williams of Mint Condition
- "Indigo"-DJ Unwind featuring Timotha Lanae
- "Night Foil"-DJ Unwind featuring Timotha Lanae

=== EDM mixes ===
- "8 Days Til Spring-Dre Hall Trap Mix"
- "Who's That Girl-Dre Hall Trap Mix"

=== Videos ===
- "Open Road ft. Ryan Liestman"
- "God, Love, Music-Remix"
- "My Man-Jigsaw Remix"
- "People Pleaser"
- "Getting To Know You"
- "Talkin To Myself"
- "Night Foil"-DJ Unwind featuring Timotha Lanae
