= DeWanda Wise =

American actress (born 1984)

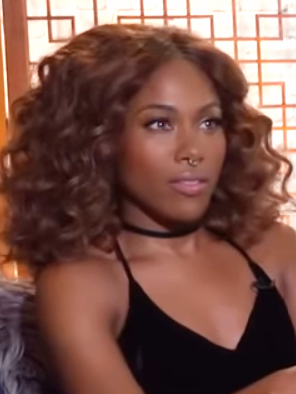
- Wise in 2019
- Born: DeWanda Jackson; May 30, 1984 (age 42); Jessup, Maryland, U.S.
- Education: Tisch School of the Arts
- Occupation: Actress
- Years active: 2006–present
- Spouse: Alano Miller (m. 2009)

DeWanda Wise (née Jackson; born May 30, 1984) is an American actress. She starred in Spike Lee's Netflix comedy-drama series She's Gotta Have It (2017–19), a contemporary adaptation of his 1986 film.

== Early life ==
Wise was born in Jessup, Maryland and raised in Woodlawn, Laurel, and Baltimore. In high school, she thought she wanted to be a therapist until she took AP Psychology and decided it was not for her. She began acting during her sophomore year at Atholton High School when her high school theatre director offered her a part in a production in lieu of detention.

In 2006, she graduated from New York University's Tisch School of the Arts with a bachelor's in fine arts in drama and urban studies, where she befriended Gina Rodriguez. During her undergraduate years, Wise worked as a resident assistant and a stocker at Trader Joe's.

== Career ==
Wise first appeared in episodes of television series including Law & Order: Special Victims Unit, The Good Wife and Boardwalk Empire. She made her film debut in the 2007 drama Spinning into Butter starring Sarah Jessica Parker, then had secondary roles in Steam (2007) and Precious (2009). In 2016, she starred in the independent romantic comedy film How to Tell You're a Douchebag that premiered at Sundance Film Festival. The next year, she had a recurring role in the WGN period drama series Underground, and starred opposite Sanaa Lathan in the Fox miniseries Shots Fired.

In 2017, she had a leading role in the Netflix comedy-drama series She's Gotta Have It, which was canceled after two seasons in 2019. In 2018, she was cast in Disney's Captain Marvel, but left the project due to scheduling conflicts with her Netflix series. That year, she appeared in the comedy film The Weekend directed by Stella Meghie.

In 2019, she starred with Gina Rodriguez and Brittany Snow in the romantic comedy film Someone Great for Netflix.

She later appeared opposite Kevin Hart and Alfre Woodard in the comedy-drama Fatherhood (2021), and co-starred in Jurassic World Dominion.

== Personal life ==
Wise married actor Alano Miller in 2009 after three months of dating. She is a vegan. She lives in Pasadena, California.

== Filmography ==
=== Film ===
Year	Title	Role	Notes
2006	Super Powers	Mrs. Elliot	Short film
2006	Who's Calling	Val	Short film
2007	Pariah	Mike	Short film
2007	Spinning into Butter	Claudia Thompson	
2007	Soul Mates	Psyche	
2007	African Booty Scratcher	Isatu	Short film
2007	Steam	Lynn	
2009	Precious	Miriam	Uncredited
2009	Us: A Love Story	Scowling Woman	Short film
2009	Beyond Words	Paige	Short film
2010	Train		Short film
2010	Pour aimer, encore	Syl	Short film
2011	A Walk in the Park		Short film
2011	Smoking Nonsmoking	Reporter	
2011	Black Swan Theory		Short film
2012	Frisk	G	Short film
2015	Knucklehead	Charlotte	
2016	How to Tell You're a Douchebag	Rochelle Marseilles	
2018	The Weekend	Margo Johnson	
2019	Someone Great	Erin Kennedy	
2021	Fatherhood	Lizzie aka Swan	
2021	The Harder They Fall	Eleanor Love	
2022	Jurassic World Dominion	Kayla Watts	
2023	Poolman	June Del Rey	
2024	Imaginary	Jessica	Also executive producer
2025	Love, Brooklyn	Nicole	
2025	Killing Faith	Sarah	

=== Television ===
Year	Title	Role	Notes
2007	Law & Order: Criminal Intent	Angela	Episode: "World's Fair"
2008	One Life to Live	Julianna	Episode: "Jumpin' Jehosophat"
2009	The Unusuals	Nurse	Episode: "42" (S01E05)
2011	The Good Wife	Jenni Salerno	Episode: "Breaking Up"
2011	Law & Order: Special Victims Unit	Lakeisha Watkins	Episode: "Dirty"
2011	Tokens the Series	Keisha/Karen	
2011	Boardwalk Empire	Henny Walker	Episode: "What Does the Bee Do?"
2012	Firelight	Terry Easle	TV movie
2014	The Mentalist	Tanya Dean	Episode: "Blue Bird"
2015	Sorta My Thing	Andrea	Two episodes
2017	Underground	Clara	5 episodes
2017	Shots Fired	Shameeka Campbell	Main cast, 10 episodes Nominated—Black Reel Award for Outstanding Supporting Actress, TV Movie or Limited Series
2017–2019	She's Gotta Have It	Nola Darling	Main cast, 19 episodes Nominated—Black Reel Award for Outstanding Actress, Comedy Series
2019	The Twilight Zone	Alexa Brandt	Episode: "Six Degrees of Freedom"
2021	Invasion	Deputy Grady	Episode: "Last Day"
2023	Three Women	Sloane	Main cast, 10 episodes
2025	Murderbot (TV series)	Nav 7	Reoccurring cast, 4 episodes
