= Elysa Dutton =

American film producer

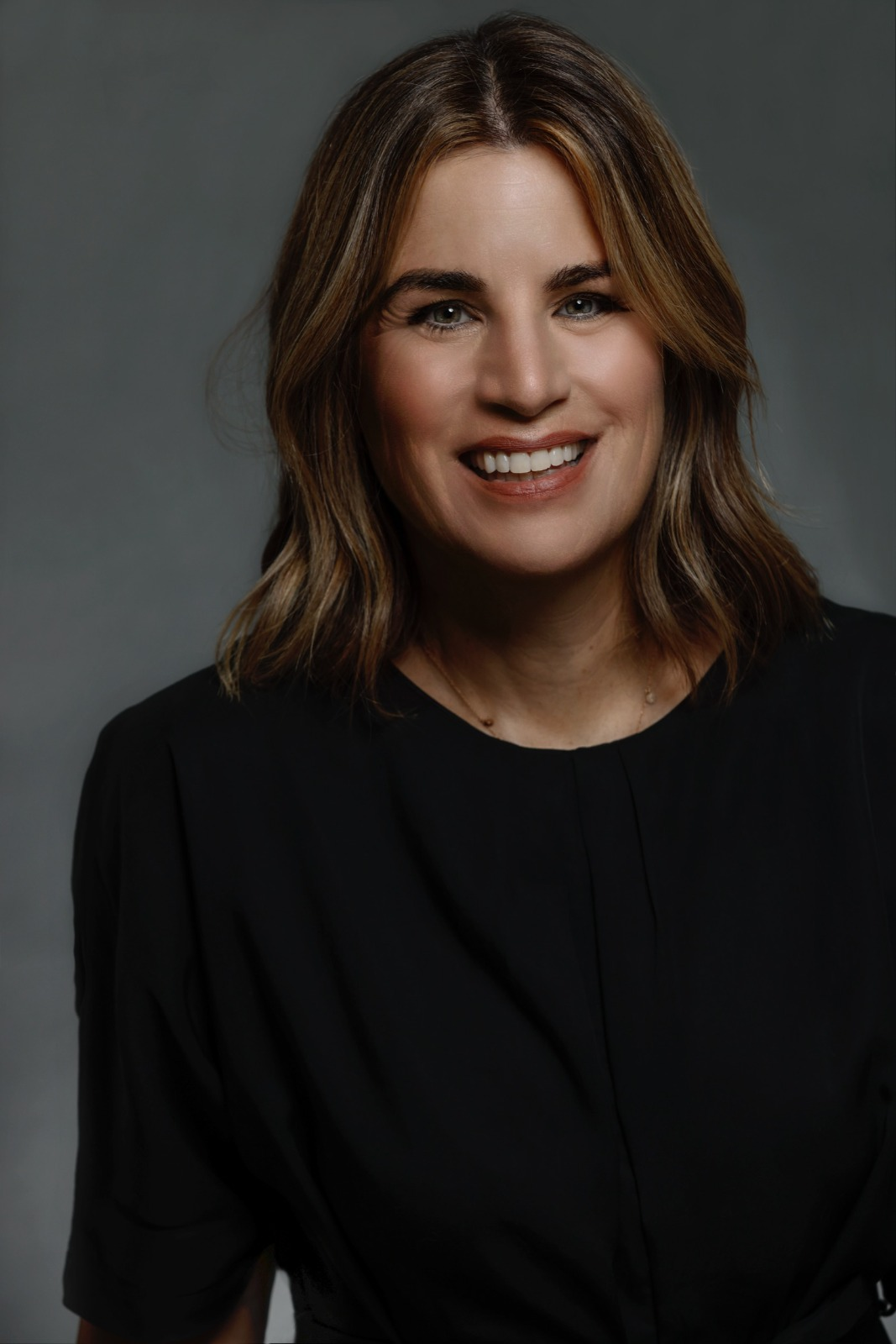

Elysa Koplovitz Dutton is a film producer and production executive. She is the author of the Penguin/Random House children's book Christmas Forever: Escape to the North Pole, illustrated by Manu Montoya, which published in October 2024.

== Early life and education ==
Koplovitz Dutton graduated from Brown University with a bachelor of arts in Art/Semiotics. While at Brown University, she co-created and produced a bi-weekly television soap opera about student life called Sob Story that was nationally syndicated to colleges around the country.

== Career ==
Koplovitz Dutton's productions credits with Alloy include Purple Hearts,You Are So Not Invited to My Bat Mitzvah, Work It, The Sun Is Also a Star, and Everything, Everything. The latter won the Teen Choice Award for Choice Movie Drama.

Prior to Alloy, Koplovitz Dutton produced Idiocracy and Like Mike.
