= Liza Koshy =

American actress (born 1996)

- Koshy in 2024
- Born: Elizabeth Shaila Koshy; March 31, 1996 (age 30); Houston, Texas, U.S.
- Education: University of Houston
- Occupations: YouTuber; media personality; actress
- Years active: 2013–present

YouTube information
- Channels: Liza Koshy; Liza Koshy Too
- Genres: Comedy, Lifestyle
- Subscribers: 16.6 million (Liza Koshy); 6.78 million (Liza Koshy Too)
- Views: 1.3 billion (Liza Koshy); 98.2 million (Liza Koshy Too)
- Last updated: November 11, 2026

Elizabeth Shaila Koshy (born March 31, 1996) is an American YouTuber and actress. She has received four Streamy Awards, four Teen Choice Awards, and a Kids' Choice Award.

Koshy began her career on Vine in 2013 before starting a YouTube channel. She made her acting debut as Aday Walker in Tyler Perry's horror comedy film Boo! A Madea Halloween (2016), and went on to star as Violet Adams in the Hulu horror drama series Freakish (2016–2017) and The Explorer in the YouTube Premium mystery series Escape the Night (2017–2019). She was also a correspondent for the MTV television series Total Request Live (2017–2018).

Koshy co-created, produced and starred as the title character in the YouTube Premium comedy series Liza on Demand (2018–2021), which earned her several accolades, and hosted the Nickelodeon game show revival Double Dare (2018–2019), for which she received a Daytime Emmy Award nomination. She starred in the Netflix dance comedy film Work It (2020), and had voice roles in the animated adventure film My Little Pony: A New Generation (2021), the science fiction film Transformers: Rise of the Beasts (2023) and the animated teen comedy film Ruby Gillman, Teenage Kraken (also from 2023).

Koshy was included in the 2019 Forbes 30 Under 30 Hollywood & Entertainment list, as well as the Time 2019 list of the 25 Most Influential People on the Internet and its 100 Next list that same year.

== Early life ==
Elizabeth Shaila Koshy was born in Houston, Texas, on March 31, 1996, the daughter of Jean Carol (née Hertzler), an American yoga instructor of German descent, and Jose Koshy, an Indian Malayali petroleum executive from Kerala. She has two older sisters. From kindergarten until fifth grade, she was placed in a dual language educational and cultural program, where she learned to speak Spanish. In 2014, after attending Lamar High School, Koshy enrolled in the University of Houston and began to study business marketing. In 2015, she left college and moved to Los Angeles to pursue a media career.

== Career ==
=== Social media ===
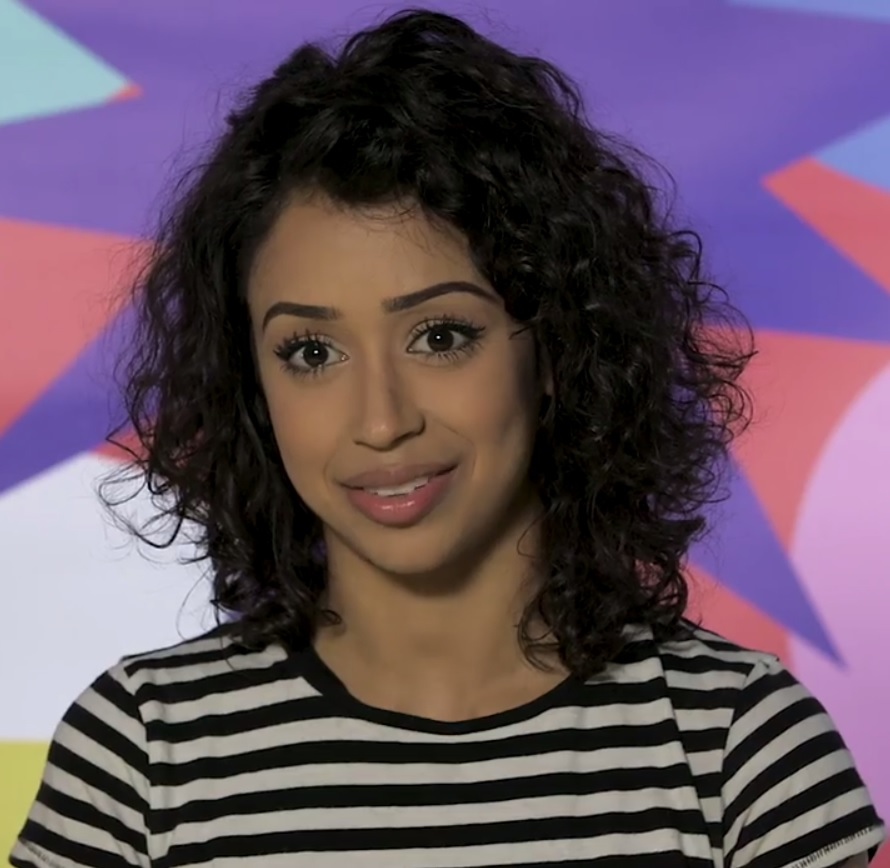
Koshy appearing on the Refinery29 YouTube channel in August 2017

Koshy began posting comic videos on the Vine platform, in 2013, under the pseudonym "Lizzza", where she posted short comedic videos. When Vine closed in 2017, Koshy had 7 million followers. By 2016, Koshy was also becoming noted on the YouTube platform. In November 2016, just before the 2016 election, Koshy interviewed President Barack Obama on her YouTube channel to encourage voter registration. Koshy's videos feature "her loud facial expressions, quick pace, and her commitment to looking as ridiculous as possible as the joke demands. [Some of her videos] take serious issues – like anxiety, the pressure to fit in, and internet trolls – and make them accessible and engaging for her viewers." She suspended adding new videos to her main YouTube account in early 2018 as she turned to full-time acting and hosting work. She resumed posting new videos in 2019.

In 2017, Koshy became "the fastest YouTube personality to reach 10 million subscribers". As of 2021, her main YouTube channel had over 17 million subscribers and more than 2 billion views. Her second YouTube channel had more than 8 million subscribers, and her two channels had a combined total of more than 3 billion views. She had more than 18 million followers on Instagram, more than 26 million followers on TikTok more than 4 million on Facebook and more than 2.8 million on Twitter. Time named Koshy to its 2019 list of the 25 Most Influential People on the Internet and its 2019 100 Next list.

=== Acting ===
In 2016, Koshy starred in the Hulu original horror series Freakish as Violet Adams. She reprised the role in the show's second season in 2017. Also in 2016, she played the role of Aday Walker in the horror-comedy feature film, Boo! A Madea Halloween, and starred as herself in the YouTube Premium series, Jingle Ballin'. Koshy starred as Princess Aubrey in the 2016 comedy film FML. In 2017, she played a recurring character, The Explorer, in the YouTube Premium mystery-reality series Escape the Night.

Koshy stars in and co-produces a YouTube Premium situation comedy series, Liza on Demand, which premiered in June 2018, "following the chaotic misadventures of the eponymous character" as she works to become an "elite tasker" doing odd jobs for pay. A reviewer for the Los Angeles Times wrote: "The first episode ... is not bad. Yet it's also ordinary and a little stiff. … But the second ... is better ... and shows off Koshy to good effect, some effective physical comedy included. It made me laugh, anyway." Season 2 premiered in September 2019. Alexis Gunderson of Paste wrote in 2019: "Liza on Demand a truly excellent comedy." In November 2018, Koshy voiced the character Owl in Crow: The Legend, an animated virtual-reality short film written and directed by Eric Darnell, starring John Legend. The film premiered on the Liza Koshy Too YouTube channel and Oculus VR on November 15, 2018. She returned to Escape the Night in 2019. She co-starred in the Netflix dance-comedy film Work It (2020). A review in The New York Times stated: "Both Koshy and [Jordan] Fisher are accomplished professional dancers, and the movie doesn't skimp on showcasing their gifts." Koshy voiced Zipp Storm in the 2021 Netflix film My Little Pony: A New Generation.

In 2023, it was announced that she would voice Serena in Primos.

=== Other ventures ===
Koshy hosted the live preshow at the 2017 Golden Globes Awards, which received 2.7 million live viewers on Twitter – a record for the medium. She also hosted Nigel Lythgoe's series Every Single Step and was "the only social entertainer chosen to promote the 2016 MTV Movie Awards." She was one of the hosts on Total Request Live on MTV from 2017 to 2018 and served as a producer and developer of content for MTV. Koshy was the first "digital star" interviewed for Vogue magazine's "73 Questions" web series. Koshy conducted interviews of the celebrities attending the 2018 and 2019 Met Galas on behalf of Vogue. She hosted the revival of the Nickelodeon game show Double Dare from June 2018 to December 2019. In 2020, Koshy hosted the Quibi dance competition show Floored.

Her online advertisements for Beats Electronics attracted four times more viewers than those of other celebrities. Koshy collaborates with The Giving Keys, a jewelry company that employs and supports people tranistioning out of homelessness, on a necklace collection. She is a co-chair of "When We All Vote", a nonpartisan, nonprofit group dedicated to increasing voter participation and promotes Beyond Meat.

== Personal life ==
Koshy dated Slovak media personality David Dobrik from late 2015 to early 2018.

== Filmography ==
Key
†	Denotes works that have not yet been released

=== Film ===
Year	Title	Role	Notes
2016	FML	Princess Aubrey	
2016	Boo! A Madea Halloween	Aday Walker	
2016	Jingle Ballin'	Liza	
2017	Crow: The Legend	Owl (voice)	Short
2020	Work It	Jasmine Hale	
2021	My Little Pony: A New Generation	Zipp Storm (voice)	
2023	Cat Person	Beth	
2023	Transformers: Rise of the Beasts	Arcee (voice)	
2023	Ruby Gillman, Teenage Kraken	Margot (voice)	
2023	Good Burger 2	Wilma the Technician	
2024	Players	Ashley	
2024	A Family Affair	Eugenie	
2025	Summer of 69	Angel	
2025	KPop Demon Hunters	Host (voice)	
2025	The Naked Gun	Detective Barnes	
2026	Family Movie		
2026	The Man with the Bag †		Post-production

=== Television ===
Year	Title	Role	Notes
2017	Making a Scene with James Franco	Herself	1 episode
2016–2017	Freakish	Violet Adams	20 episodes
2017–2019	Escape the Night	The Explorer	12 episodes
2017–2018	Total Request Live	Herself	Correspondent
2017	Ellen's Show Me More Show	Herself	Episode: "Liza Koshy Takes On Ellen’s Burning Questions"
2018–2021	Liza on Demand	Liza Hertzler	25 episodes; also co-creator, executive producer, and director; wrote "Pilot" and directed "The Art of Settling" and "Truthousand"
2018–2019	Double Dare	Herself / Host	61 episodes; also executive producer
2019	Welcome to the Wayne	Bianca Davis	Voice role; episode: "Wiles Styles You Over"
2019	To Tell the Truth	Herself / Contestant	Episode: "Tim Meadows/Justin Long/Liza Koshy/Missi Pyle"
2019	Sugar Rush Christmas	Herself / Guest Judge	Episode: "Christmas Spirit"
2020	All That	Herself	Episode: "1119"
2020	Nickelodeon's Unfiltered	Herself	Episode: "Corgi Rock Party!"
2020	Floored	Herself / Host	12 episodes; also executive producer
2020	Scooby-Doo and Guess Who?	Herself	Voice role; episode: "The Internet On Haunted House Hill!"
2020	Punk'd	Herself	Episode: "Bat Mitzvah'd with Liza Koshy"
2020	The Great Global Cleanup	Herself	Television special
2021	Chopped Next Gen	Herself / Host	5 episodes
2021–2023	Dick Clark's New Year's Rockin' Eve	Herself	Television specials
2022	Dancing with Myself	Herself / Judge	8 episodes; also co-creator and executive producer
2022	The Tiny Chef Show	Herself	Episode: "Ants on a Log/Quesadilla"
2022	Tab Time	Stevie Sweatbands	Episode: "Taking Care of Yourself"
2022	America's Got Talent	Herself	Episode: "Auditions 1"
2022–2024	The Ghost and Molly McGee	Jinx	Voice role; 4 episodes
2022–2025	Hamster & Gretel	Veronica Hill	Voice role
2023–present	Big City Greens	Jade	Voice role; 5 episodes
2024–2025	Primos	Serena	Voice role
2025	Mo	Talia	2 episodes

=== Music videos ===
Year	Title	Artist	Notes
2019	"Woke Up Late"	Drax Project ft. Hailee Steinfeld	
2020	"Relationship"	Anthony Ramos	

== Recognition ==
Teen Vogue named Koshy to its 2016 list of "The 7 Female Comedians You Need to Know". The Hollywood Reporter included Koshy in its 2017 list of "15 Rising Crossover Stars". The Washington Post cited Koshy as one of the "funny women...at the top of their game today [who] girls get to study" as models for comedy and empowerment. She is a member of the 2019 Forbes 30 Under 30 Hollywood & Entertainment list.

John Jurgensen of The Wall Street Journal described Koshy's appeal as follows: "Her comedy is heavy on self-deprecation, slapstick and wordplay, more goofy than snarky. ... One reason her sketches work for advertisers is the replay factor, [squeezing] in dozens of puns and double meanings, in part to encourage easily distracted viewers to re-watch. ... Koshy has proven to be safe territory for established entertainment companies and advertisers who have fled from edgier online content". Alexis Gunderson of Paste compared Koshy to Lucille Ball and calls her a "physical comedy wunderkind" and "a tiny magnetic goofball".

=== Awards and nominations ===
Koshy has won four Streamy Awards and Teen Choice Awards, and a Kids' Choice Award.

Awardshow	Year	Category	Work	Result	Ref.
Daytime Emmy Awards	2020	Outstanding Game Show	Double Dare (as executive producer)	Nominated	
Nickelodeon Kids' Choice Awards	2018	Favorite Funny YouTube Creator	Herself	Won	
Nickelodeon Kids' Choice Awards	2019	Favorite TV Host	Double Dare (with Marc Summers)	Nominated	
People's Choice Awards	2017	Favorite Social Media Star	Herself	Nominated	
People's Choice Awards	2019	Favorite Social Media Star	Herself	Nominated	
Shorty Awards	2017	YouTuber of the Year	Herself	Nominated	
Shorty Awards	2018	Creator of the Decade	Herself	Nominated	
Streamy Awards	2016	Breakout Creator	Herself	Won	
Streamy Awards	2017	Creator of the Year	Herself	Nominated	
Streamy Awards	2017	Comedy	Herself	Won	
Streamy Awards	2017	Editing	Herself	Nominated	
Streamy Awards	2018	Creator of the Year	Herself	Nominated	
Streamy Awards	2018	Comedy Series	Liza on Demand	Won	
Streamy Awards	2018	Acting in a Comedy	Liza on Demand	Won	
Teen Choice Awards	2017	Choice Female Web Star	Herself	Won	
Teen Choice Awards	2017	Choice Comedy Web Star	Herself	Nominated	
Teen Choice Awards	2017	Choice YouTuber	Herself	Nominated	
Teen Choice Awards	2018	Choice Female Web Star	Herself	Won	
Teen Choice Awards	2018	Choice Comedy Web Star	Herself	Won	
Teen Choice Awards	2018	Choice YouTuber	Herself	Won	
