= Everything, Everything (film) =

2017 film by Stella Meghie

- Theatrical release poster
- Directed by: Stella Meghie
- Written by: J. Mills Goodloe
- Based on: Everything, Everything by Nicola Yoon
- Produced by: Elysa Dutton; Leslie Morgenstein
- Starring: Amandla Stenberg; Nick Robinson; Ana de la Reguera; Anika Noni Rose
- Cinematography: Igor Jadue-Lillo
- Edited by: Nancy Richardson
- Music by: Ludwig Göransson; Zedd
- Production companies: Metro-Goldwyn-Mayer Pictures; Alloy Entertainment
- Distributed by: Warner Bros. Pictures
- Release date: May 19, 2017 (United States)
- Running time: 96 minutes
- Country: United States
- Language: English
- Budget: $10 million
- Box office: $61.6 million

Everything, Everything is a 2017 American romantic drama film directed by Stella Meghie and written by J. Mills Goodloe, based on Nicola Yoon's 2015 novel. The film was produced by Elysa Dutton and Leslie Morgenstein and stars Amandla Stenberg and Nick Robinson and follows a young woman named Maddy Whittier (Stenberg) who has a serious medical condition that prevents her from leaving her home, and her neighbor, Olly Bright (Nick Robinson), who wants to help her experience life and they begin falling in love.

Principal photography began on September 6, 2016, in Vancouver, British Columbia, and wrapped up the next month on October 7, 2016.

The film was released on May 19, 2017, by Warner Bros. Pictures. It received mixed reviews from critics, with praise directed at the two lead performances, but with heavy criticism aimed at the screenplay; nevertheless, it was a commercial success, grossing $61 million worldwide on a production budget of $10 million.

== Plot ==
In suburban Los Angeles, 18-year-old Maddy Whittier is being treated for the immune disorder SCID by her mother, Pauline. Her nurse, Carla, has helped take care of Maddy for 15 years. Pauline constantly monitors her daughter's health status and provides daily medication. Only she, Carla, and Carla's daughter, Rosa, are allowed in the home. Maddy is not allowed to leave the house or interact with anyone or anything that has not been "sanitized." She yearns to see the world, especially the ocean.

One day, a new family moves next door, and their son, who is Maddy's age, catches her eye. Later that night, while she and Pauline are watching a movie, the boy and his sister appear on their doorstep, offering a bundt cake. Pauline politely rejects it, and as she is closing the door, the boy asks where her daughter is. She lies, telling him Maddy is not home. As Pauline sees Maddy's desire to get to know the boy, she tries to block off all opportunities for her to contact him. It is also revealed that his father is violent and their relationship is strained.

Later, the boy writes his phone number on his window for Maddy and soon they begin communicating through text messages. He introduces himself as Olly, and they email for a while, getting to know each other and eventually growing very fond of each other. Knowing her mother would disapprove, Maddy convinces Carla to secretly let Olly visit her inside the house, though Carla makes them promise to stay on different sides of the room from each other. She later invites Olly over on the Fourth of July, as her mother is working that day. Maddy and Olly share a passionate kiss as fireworks go off outside.

The next day, Maddy sees Olly fighting with his father outside. When his father shoves him to the ground, she, to Pauline's shock, rushes outside to comfort Olly. Deducing that Maddy and Olly have been seeing each other behind her back, she forbids their relationship and later fires Carla for betraying her trust. Maddy decides it is time she took matters into her own hands, and using a credit card she had previously opened online, she buys tickets to Hawaii, and convinces Olly to go there with her. On the way to the airport, Olly calls his sister, Kara, telling her that he is going to Hawaii with Maddy for a couple of days and to take care of their mother.

In Hawaii, they share a romantic and life-changing experience. Pauline sends a police car to find Maddy, and when she spots Kara walking by the house, she asks if she knows where Maddy and her brother are but denies it. During the trip, Maddy passes out and Olly rushes her to the hospital and she wakes up back in bed at home. She breaks off contact with Olly as she does not want to make another mistake over love again; therefore, she is unable to say goodbye when his mother finally decides to leave his father, taking Olly and his sister back to New York with her.

A doctor from the hospital in Hawaii calls Maddy to give her an update, telling her that her condition is not as severe as SCID. Scouring her mother's records, she can not find anything indicating she had ever been diagnosed with the disorder. Upset that her mother has been lying to her all her life, Maddy runs away from home and stays with Carla and Rosa. A doctor confirms Maddy has never had SCID, just an underdeveloped immune system from under-exposure due to spending most of her life in filtered air. Pauline later tells her that after her father and brother died in a car crash, she was all she had left and she wanted to keep her safe. Giving Maddy a bag of her things, she leaves.

Later, Maddy reunites with Olly in New York, where they restart their romance.

== Cast ==
- Amandla Stenberg as Madeline "Maddy" Whittier
- Nick Robinson as Oliver "Olly" Bright
- Anika Noni Rose as Dr. Pauline Whittier, Maddy's mother
- Ana de la Reguera as Carla, Maddy's nurse
- Taylor Hickson as Kayra Bright, Olly's younger sister

== Production ==
Principal photography on the film began on September 6, 2016, in Vancouver, British Columbia.

== Music ==
Everything, Everything (Original Motion Picture Soundtrack)

Soundtrack album by various artists
- Released: May 17, 2017
- Genre: Soundtrack
- Label: Interscope

Singles from Everything, Everything (Original Motion Picture Soundtrack)
- 1. "Ocean Eyes" Released: November 18, 2016; 2. "Stay" Released: February 23, 2017

Everything, Everything (Original Motion Picture Soundtrack)
No.	Title	Performer(s)	Length
1.	"Heartbeats"	José González	2:28
2.	"Night Drive"	Ari Lennox	2:31
3.	"Let's Go"	Khalid	3:28
4.	"In Your Eyes"	BadBadNotGood, Charlotte Day Wilson	4:08
5.	"Howling"	Ry X	5:11
6.	"Ocean Eyes"	Billie Eilish	3:23
7.	"Parking Lot"	Anderson Paak	3:57
8.	"Stay"	Zedd, Alessia Cara	3:33
9.	"Escape" (acoustic)	Kehlani	3:19
10.	"Girl"	The Internet, Kaytranada	3:58
11.	"How Did We"	Skylar Stecker	3:44
12.	"Let My Baby Stay" (cover)	Amandla Stenberg	2:25
Total length:			39:37

Everything, Everything (Original Motion Picture Score)

Film score by Ludwig Göransson
- Released: May 12, 2017
- Label: Sony Classical

Everything, Everything (Original Motion Picture Score)
No.	Title	Length
1.	"Living in a Bubble"	5:33
2.	"The Bundt Diaries"	2:30
3.	"Completely Gone"	0:57
4.	"Book Reviews and Big Dates"	1:42
5.	"First Kisses"	2:40
6.	"Just Online Friends"	1:15
7.	"Infections and Reflections"	2:44
8.	"Nurse Janet"	0:59
9.	"The Library Fight"	2:10
10.	"Ocean Photographs"	2:44
11.	"First Flight"	1:17
12.	"Cliff Jump"	1:06
13.	"First Times"	2:15
14.	"Crashing"	2:14
15.	"Ellipses"	1:59
16.	"Saying Goodbye"	3:12
17.	"Truths"	1:54
18.	"Everything"	2:44
19.	"Everything, Everything"	1:14
20.	"End Titles, Last Bundt"	2:30

== Release and reception ==
Everything, Everything was released on May 19, 2017, by Warner Bros. Pictures and Metro-Goldwyn-Mayer Pictures. It was originally scheduled for August 18, 2017, but was moved up to its May date.

=== Box office ===
Everything, Everything grossed $34.1 million in the United States and Canada and $27.5 million in other countries, for a worldwide total of $61.6 million, against a production budget of $10 million.

In North America, the film was released alongside Alien: Covenant and Diary of a Wimpy Kid: The Long Haul, and was projected to gross $10–12 million from 2,801 theaters during its opening weekend. It made $525,000 from Thursday night previews and $4.7 million on its first day. It went on to open to $11.7 million, finishing 3rd at the box office.

=== Critical response ===
On Rotten Tomatoes, the film has an approval rating of 45% based on 121 reviews, with an average rating of 5.30/10. The website's critical consensus reads, "Everything, Everything should tug young adult heartstrings fairly effectively, but may not be quite engrossing enough to woo less melodramatically inclined viewers." On Metacritic, the film has a score of 52 out of 100, based on 26 critics, indicating "mixed or average" reviews. Audiences polled by CinemaScore gave the film an average grade of "A−" on an A+ to F scale.

The Immune Deficiency Foundation criticized the film as "erroneously misrepresenting [SCID] through worn stereotypes and misinformation," singling out in particular the film's use of Munchhausen-by-proxy as damaging to patients who actually have SCID.

== See also ==
- The Boy in the Plastic Bubble
