= Stephanie Allain =

American producer

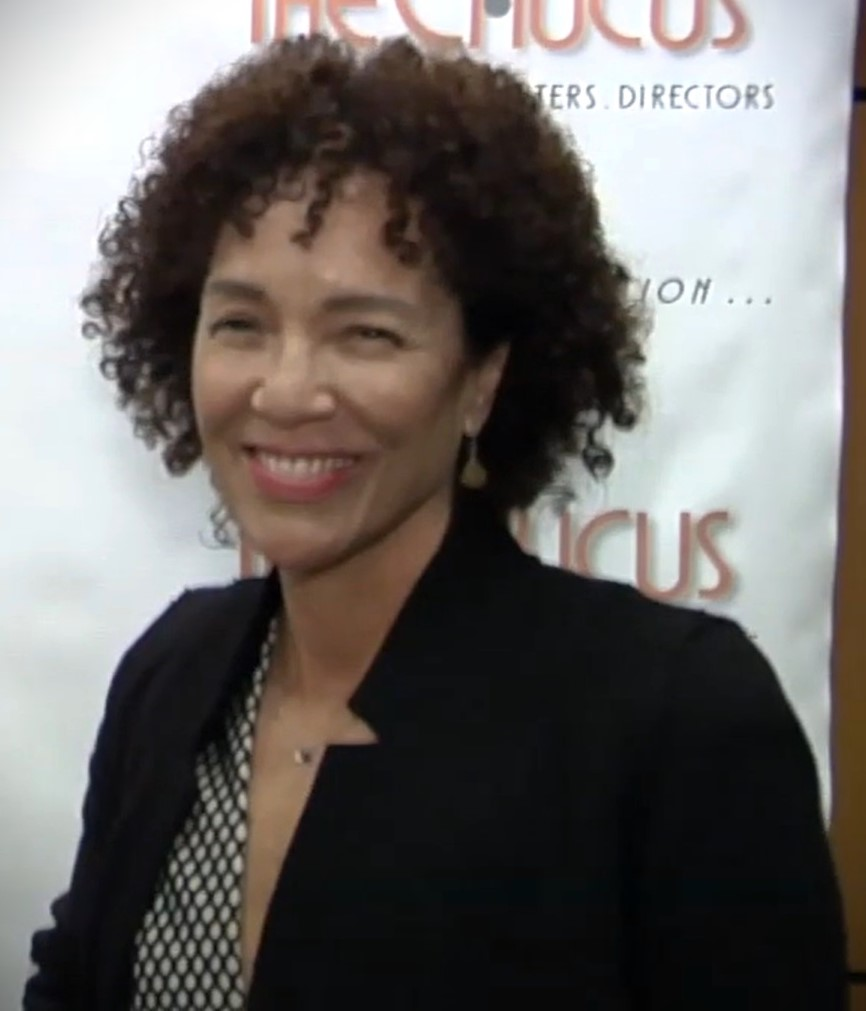
Allain in 2016

Stephanie Allain (born October 30, 1959) is an American film producer.

== Career ==
She began her film career in 1985 at Creative Artists Agency, first as a script reader, then as a staff reader. As a story analyst, she worked for 20th Century Fox, Warner Bros., and finally in 1989, at Columbia Pictures. There, Allain was one of twelve readers at the studio, and one of only two African-American readers. She rose through the ranks to become Senior Vice President of Production and was influential in encouraging and developing an African-American filmmaking community in Hollywood in the 1990s.

During her tenure at Columbia, Allain launched the careers of several young filmmakers including John Singleton, Robert Rodriguez and Darnell Martin. She personally pitched to Columbia's executives Singleton's Boyz n the Hood (1991). The controversial film would become a critical and commercial hit, garnering Singleton two Academy Award nominations. Among the films under her supervision were Poetic Justice (1993), I Like It Like That (1994), and The Craft (1996).

In 1996, Allain left Columbia Pictures to become President of Jim Henson Pictures. During her 4 years there, she produced Caroline Thompson's Buddy, as well as Henson brand movies, Muppets from Space and The Adventures of Elmo in Grouchland. After her stint at Henson, Allain joined 3Arts Entertainment, where she developed projects for clients and produced Reggie Rock Bythewood's Biker Boyz.

In 2003, Allain sold her house and founded Homegrown Films. Teaming with John Singleton, Craig Brewer's Hustle & Flow was produced. Hustle & Flow was sold to MTV/Paramount for 9 million dollars and went on to win the Audience Award at Sundance in 2005, an Academy Award for Best Original Song and earned a Best Actor nomination for Terrence Howard.

In 2006, Allain and Homegrown Films produced another first time director, music video director, Sanaa Hamri's Something New, starring Sanaa Lathan and Simon Baker. She also worked again with producer John Singleton, partnering with Craig Brewer and his Southern Cross the Dog production company based at Paramount Pictures. Paramount Vantage released their latest film, Black Snake Moan, starring Samuel L. Jackson, Christina Ricci and Justin Timberlake on February 23, 2007.

She was the Festival Director for the LA Film Festival from 2011 to 2016. In 2021, she received a first look deal with Endeavor Content.

== Filmography ==
She was a producer in all films unless otherwise noted.

=== Film ===
Year	Film	Credit
1997	Buddy	Executive producer
1999	Muppets from Space	Executive producer
1999	The Adventures of Elmo in Grouchland	Executive producer
2000	Rat	Executive producer
2003	Biker Boyz	
2003	Good Boy!	Executive producer
2005	Hustle & Flow	
2006	Something New	
2006	Black Snake Moan	
2009	Hurricane Season	
2013	Peeples	
2014	Dear White People	
2014	Beyond the Lights	Executive producer
2015	French Dirty	Executive producer
2017	Burning Sands	
2018	The Weekend	
2019	Juanita	
2020	Really Love	Executive producer
2023	The Exorcist: Believer	Executive producer
2024	Exhibiting Forgiveness	
2025	The Woman in the Yard	

As an actress

Year	Title	Role	Notes
1995	A Boy Called Hate	Ma	
2015	French Dirty	Waitress	Uncredited

=== Television ===
Year	Title	Credit	Notes
2016	Crushed	Executive producer	Television film
2018	Life-Size 2	Executive producer	Television film
2017−19	Dear White People	Executive producer	
2020	92nd Academy Awards		Television special
2020	Women in Film Presents: Make it Work!	Executive producer	Television special
2021	Leimert Park: The Digital Series	Executive producer	
