= Good Girls Get High =

- Theatrical release poster
- Directed by: Laura Terruso
- Screenplay by: Laura Terruso; Jennifer Nashorn Blankenship
- Produced by: Elysa Koplovitz Dutton; Leslie Morgenstein
- Starring: Abby Quinn; Stefanie Scott; Lauren Lapkus; Matt Besser; Isabelle Fuhrman; Danny Pudi
- Cinematography: Benjamin Rutkowski
- Edited by: John Wesley Whitton; Stacey Schroeder
- Music by: Jay Israelson
- Production companies: Alloy Entertainment; Blue Ribbon Content; Warner Specialty Video Productions
- Distributed by: DirecTV Cinema
- Release dates: September 22, 2018 (LAFF); October 10, 2019 (United States)
- Running time: 77 minutes
- Language: English

Good Girls Get High is a 2018 film directed by Laura Terruso and written by Terruso and Jennifer Nashorn Blankenship. It stars Abby Quinn, Stefanie Scott, Lauren Lapkus, Matt Besser, Isabelle Fuhrman, Danny Pudi, Chanté Adams, and Booboo Stewart. It premiered at the Los Angeles Film Festival on September 22, 2018, and became available on DirecTV on October 10, 2019, receiving a limited theatrical release beginning November 8.

== Plot ==
A pair of ambitious high school seniors, Sam and Danielle, are voted the school's "Biggest Good Girls". Sam discovers a joint stashed in her dad's laundry and the two friends start behaving badly and experimenting with drugs to impress their peers, leading them on a chaotic journey through a night that quickly escalates beyond their control.

== Cast ==
- Abby Quinn as Sam
- Stefanie Scott as Danielle
- Lauren Lapkus as Patty
- Matt Besser as Larry
- Isabelle Fuhrman as Morgan
- Danny Pudi as Mr. D
- Chanté Adams as Ashanti
- Booboo Stewart as Jeremy
- Miles McKenna as Pizza Ken

== Reception ==
On review aggregator website Rotten Tomatoes the film has an approval rating of 100% based on five critics. On Metacritic, the film have an above average score of 63 out of 100 based on four critics, indicating "generally favorable reviews".

Frank Scheck of The Hollywood Reporter said that "The film is sweetly amusing throughout, knowing enough not to wear out its welcome thanks to its fast-paced 77-minute running time."

Courtney Howard of Variety said "This concept teen comedy about female friendship and panic over the onset of adulthood distinguishes itself in a crowded genre."
