= Benjamin Stone (actor) =

British actor (born 1987)

- Born: 3 April 1987 (age 38); Kingston upon Thames, Greater London, England, United Kingdom

Benjamin Stone (born 3 April 1987) is a British actor. He has a twin sister. He is known for playing "Alek Petrov" in The Nine Lives of Chloe King, and William "Blank" Blankenship in the series 10 Things I Hate About You. He is also known for being a voice actor in four of the Harry Potter video games.

== Filmography ==
Year	Title	Role	Notes
2000	Randall and Hopkirk	credited as Ben Johnstone	1 episode
2010	10 Things I Hate About You	William "Blank" Blankenship	Recurring
2011	The Nine Lives of Chloe King	Alek Petrov	Main role
2014	Lucky Stiff	Telegraph Boy	kaylin jones ᾚ⟨⟩Minor role
2015	Bikini Model Academy	T.J.	
2016	Youthful Daze	Cody Ryan	78 episodes
