= Killing Faith =

- Release poster
- Directed by: Ned Crowley
- Written by: Ned Crowley
- Story by: Ned Crowley; David Martin
- Produced by: Ned Crowley; David Martin; Zori Davidkova; Wes Hager
- Starring: Guy Pearce; DeWanda Wise; Raoul Trujillo; Jamie Neumann; Jack Alcott; Joanna Cassidy; Emily Ford; Bill Pullman
- Cinematography: Justin Hamilton
- Edited by: Thijs Bazelmans
- Music by: Brooke Blair; Will Blair
- Production companies: Choice Films; Film Bridge International; Obsolete Media
- Distributed by: Shout! Studios
- Release dates: September 26, 2025 (Beyond Fest); October 3, 2025 (United States)
- Running time: 108 minutes
- Country: United States
- Language: English

Killing Faith is a 2025 American supernatural Western thriller film written and directed by Ned Crowley. It stars Guy Pearce, DeWanda Wise, Raoul Trujillo, Jamie Neumann, Jack Alcott, Joanna Cassidy, Emily Ford, and Bill Pullman.

== Premise ==
Killing Faith is set in the American West in 1849. Sarah, a formerly enslaved woman, flees with her mysterious, light-skinned daughter through a region ravaged by disease and violence. Sarah believes her daughter is possessed by the Devil, as every living thing the girl touches seems to die. Dr. Bender, a widowed physician, suspects a medical condition instead. Nevertheless, he accompanies the pair to a purported faith healer who is supposed to save the girl.

During the perilous journey, faith, science, and the concepts of good and evil become increasingly intertwined—and Bender begins to doubt his own rational explanation.

Ultimately, Sarah attempts to drown her daughter in the river, having become convinced that the girl is possessed by evil. Dr. Bender intervenes and shoots Sarah to save the child, then takes the girl with him to Ross Corner. There, Preacher Ross initially appears willing to help. In reality, however, he is pursuing his own agenda and plans to kill both Bender and the girl. Bender is taken prisoner. Then comes the pivotal moment: the girl speaks to Bender, urging him—in essence—to shatter the iron that he cannot bend. To free himself, Bender brutally smashes his hands against a stone and succeeds in breaking loose. The girl evidently possesses a genuine supernatural ability. She can not only kill people with her touch but also restore life. She brings her mother, Sarah—whom Bender had shot—back to life.

In the end, Sarah, her daughter, and Dr. Bender all survive.

The film deliberately leaves it open whether the girl is truly a supernatural being or perhaps something else entirely. Her abilities are real, but the film offers no clear explanation as to whether she is "good" or "evil." The film’s core idea, then, is this: it is people’s fear of the unknown that turns the girl into a monster. Driven by fear, Sarah believes she must kill her own daughter. Bender, on the other hand, chooses to trust the child—and is rewarded for it. The ending, therefore, is less a classic "demon defeated" conclusion and more a story about faith, fear, prejudice, and redemption.

== Cast ==
- Guy Pearce as Dr. Bender, a faithless physician
- DeWanda Wise as Sarah
- Bill Pullman as Preacher Ross
- Raoul Trujillo as Shakespeare
- Jamie Neumann as Whitey
- Jack Alcott as Edward
- Joanna Cassidy as Maggie
- Emily Ford as the girl
- Josh McDermitt as Stanton
- Charlie Talbert as Cotton
- Keith Jardine as Gibson
- Andrew J. West as Leg Splint, a sheriff
- Gail Cronauer as Miss Atwater

== Production ==
In November 2023, it was announced that a supernatural thriller film written and directed by Ned Crowley was in development, titled Killing Faith, with Guy Pearce, DeWanda Wise, and Bill Pullman cast in lead roles. Principal photography began in and around Santa Fe, New Mexico in January 2024.

== Release ==
The film had its world premiere at the Beyond Fest on September 26, 2025, and was released on October 3, 2025.

== Reception ==
On the review aggregator website Rotten Tomatoes, 76% of 17 critics' reviews are positive.
