= The Weekend (2018 film) =

2018 film directed by Stella Meghie

- Theatrical release poster
- Directed by: Stella Meghie
- Screenplay by: Stella Meghie
- Produced by: Stephanie Allain; Mel Jones; Sarah Lazow; James Gibb
- Starring: Sasheer Zamata; Tone Bell; DeWanda Wise; Y'lan Noel; Kym Whitley
- Cinematography: Kris Belchevski
- Edited by: Shannon Baker Davis
- Music by: Robi Botos
- Production companies: Marada Pictures; Homegrown Pictures
- Distributed by: Lionsgate
- Release dates: September 11, 2018 (TIFF); September 13, 2019 (United States)
- Running time: 86 minutes
- Country: United States
- Language: English

The Weekend is a 2018 American comedy film written and directed by Stella Meghie. It stars Sasheer Zamata, Tone Bell, DeWanda Wise, Y'lan Noel, and Kym Whitley. It had its world premiere at the Toronto International Film Festival on September 11, 2018. Lionsgate released the film in theaters on September 13, 2019.

== Synopsis ==
The Toronto International Film Festival described the film, "An acerbic comedian (Sasheer Zamata) becomes romantically entangled with her ex (Tone Bell), his new girlfriend (DeWanda Wise), and another guest (Y’Lan Noel) during a weekend getaway."

== Cast ==
- Sasheer Zamata as Zadie Barber, Bradford’s ex and Karen’s daughter
- Tone Bell as Bradford Collins, Zadie’s ex and Margo’s boyfriend
- DeWanda Wise as Margo Johnson, Bradford’s new girlfriend
- Y'lan Noel as Aubrey, guest of Inn
- Kym Whitley as Karen Barber, Zadie’s mother

== Production ==
In March 2018, Sasheer Zamata, Tone Bell, DeWanda Wise, Y'lan Noel and Kym Whitley had joined the cast of the film, with Stella Meghie directing from a screenplay she wrote. Meghie, Sarah Lazow, James Gibb, Stephanie Allain and Mel Jones produced the film under their Marada Pictures and Homegrown Pictures banners, respectively.

== Release ==
It was released on September 13, 2019.

== Critical reception ==
The review aggregator website Rotten Tomatoes assigned the film an approval rating of 87%, based on 23 reviews assessed as positive or negative; the average rating among the reviews is 6.4/10. The site's critical consensus reads, "Led by a potentially star-making performance from Sasheer Zamata, The Weekend takes a well-acted, smartly written approach to familiar character dynamics."

== See also ==
- List of black films of the 2010s
