= Elizabeth J. Braswell =

American writer

Elizabeth J. Braswell, often known as Liz Braswell, is a British-born American writer of young adult fiction. She is best known for her New York Times bestselling books in Disney's Twisted Tales series, along with The Nine Lives of Chloe King, a series that was adapted as a 2011 television show of the same name. She is also known to publish work under the names Tracy Lynn, Rob Kidd, J. B. Stephens, and Celia Thompson.

== Early life and education ==
Braswell was born in Birmingham and grew up in a small New England town. She graduated from Brown University with a degree in Egyptology.

== Career ==
Before she changed professions and began writing novels, Braswell produced video games for almost a decade, mostly at Simon & Schuster Interactive, where, among other credits, she served as executive producer for Darkened Skye and Farscape: The Game.

Braswell has written for Disney Press, particularly as one of the authors for its Twisted Tales series which are revisionist novels dealing "What If" stories in the Disney canon.

As of 2022, Braswell has a column with the Wall Street Journal, reviewing fantasy, science-fiction, and horror.

== List of works ==
=== Novels ===
- Snow (2003) (as Tracy Lynn)
- RX (2005) (as Tracy Lynn)
- Stuffed (2019)
- Stuffed: Into Darkness (2021)

==== The Nine Lives of Chloe King ====
- The Fallen (2004) (as Celia Thomson)
- The Stolen (2004) (as Celia Thomson)
- The Chosen (2005) (as Celia Thomson)

==== The Big Empty ====
- The Big Empty (2004) (as J. B. Stephens)
- Paradise City (2004) (as J. B. Stephens)
- Desolation Angels (2005) (as J. B. Stephens)
- No Exit (2005) (as J. B. Stephens)

==== Pirates of the Caribbean: The Original Adventures of Young Jack Sparrow ====
- The Coming Storm (2006) (as Rob Kidd)
- The Age of Bronze (2006) (as Rob Kidd)
- Silver (2007) (as Rob Kidd)
- City of Gold (2007) (as Rob Kidd)
- Dance of the Hours (2007) (as Rob Kidd)

==== Disney's Twisted Tales ====
- A Whole New World (2015)
- Once Upon a Dream (2016)
- As Old as Time (2016)
- Part of Your World (2018)
- Straight on Till Morning (2019)
- Unbirthday (2020)
- What Once Was Mine (2021)

=== Short fiction ===
- One of Us (2009) (as Tracy Lynn)
- The Bride (Amazing Stories)

== Awards ==
Her book The Stolen won ALA Quick Picks for Reluctant Young Adult Readers and her book The Fallen won ALA Quick Picks for Reluctant Young Adult Readers and NYPL Books for the TeenAge.
