= Jean of the Joneses =

2016 film by Stella Meghie

- Film poster
- Directed by: Stella Meghie
- Written by: Stella Meghie
- Produced by: Amos Adetuyi; Floyd Kane; Stella Meghie
- Starring: Taylour Paige; Sherri Shepherd; Erica Ash; Michelle Hurst; Mamoudou Athie; François Arnaud; Gloria Reuben
- Cinematography: Kris Belchevski
- Edited by: Aren Hansen
- Music by: Robi Botos
- Production companies: Circle Blue Films; Freddie Films
- Distributed by: Search Engine Films
- Release dates: March 13, 2016 (SXSW); November 11, 2016 (Canada)
- Running time: 86 minutes
- Country: Canada
- Language: English

Jean of the Joneses is a 2016 Canadian comedy-drama film written, directed, and co-produced by Stella Meghie (in her feature directorial debut). It stars Taylour Paige, Sherri Shepherd, Erica Ash, Michelle Hurst, Mamoudou Athie, François Arnaud, and Gloria Reuben. It follows a woman in her mid-twenties named Jean and her Jamaican-American family of strong-minded but fiercely loving women.

The film had its world premiere at South by Southwest on March 13, 2016, and was given a limited theatrical release in Canada on November 11, 2016, by Search Engine Films. It received positive reviews from critics, who praised Meghie's screenplay and the performances of the cast. At the 5th Canadian Screen Awards, it garnered two nominations: Best Original Screenplay (for Meghie) and Best Actress in a Supporting Role (for Shepherd). Meghie was also nominated for Outstanding Screenplay, TV Movie or Limited Series at the 17th Black Reel Awards and for Best First Screenplay at the 32nd Independent Spirit Awards.

== Plot ==
Jean Jones is a writer who comes from a family of Jamaican-American matriarchs. After her boyfriend tells her he needs space, she moves out of his apartment and goes to dinner at her grandmother's house. Just as the family is about to sit down to dinner the doorbell rings, and Jean goes to answer it, finding a man who abruptly dies after asking for Jean's grandmother. The dead man's things reveal he is Gordan Jones and after confronting her family, Jean learns that he is her estranged grandfather.

Jean goes to live with her aunt, Anne, a pot-smoking nurse who is having an affair with a doctor and confides to Jean that she is pregnant with his child. Jean is a poor houseguest, leading Anne to kick her out. Jean goes to stay with her strict mother, Maureen. Maureen is critical of Jean's failure as an author, working as a waitress after using up the advance of her last book, while also critical of her daughter's budding relationship with the EMT driver Ray. Jean manages to convince Maureen to claim Gordan's body and arrange for a funeral, but after Maureen asks Jean when she is moving back with her boyfriend, Jean moves out and goes to live with her aunt Janet.

While at Janet's, Jean discovers that Janet is separated from her husband and that she has a secret aunt Laura, from her father's relationship with another woman. Talking to Laura, Jean learns that Laura was a baby when Gordan left her mother, then inadvertently divulges that Gordan died, something Laura had no idea about.

At Gordan's wake Jean confronts her family. Her grandmother reveals that she always knew that Gordan was still living nearby in Harlem and lied about him returning to Jamaica, which devastates her daughters for having been prevented from seeing their father. Jean reveals her discovery that grandmother has a boyfriend, which her aunts realize is her mother's decades-long boyfriend. She also invites Ray, who reveals that he read her book of short stories and asks her if she truly believes she is destined to end up single and alone, telling her that to do so would be a choice, not her fate.

Jean goes to her old boyfriend, Jeremiah who tells her that they are over for good. With nowhere to go and having used up all the goodwill from her family, Jean goes to Gordan's home where she discovers that he was a recorded jazz musician, that he followed her writing career and unearths his will.

At Gordan's funeral Jean reads out a statement from his will where he apologized for being a terrible father and abandoning his children.

After hearing what their father said, the Jones women begin to heal. Maureen tells Jean she loves her, Anne decides to keep her baby and Janet, still separated from her husband, works towards co-parenting peacefully with him. After it turns out that Gordan left his home to Jean's grandmother, she decides to let Jean stay there if she pays rent.

Meanwhile, Jean helps to publish Gordan's memoirs, which she also discovered as part of his estate and writes the foreword. With her life back on track she goes to Ray's school where he is studying nursing and asks him to be with her.

== Cast ==
- Taylour Paige as Jean Jones
- Sherri Shepherd as Maureen, Jean's mother
- Erica Ash as Anne, Jean's aunt
- Michelle Hurst as Daphne, Jean's grandmother
- Gloria Reuben as Janet, Jean's aunt
- Mamoudou Athie as Ray
- Cara Ricketts as Laura, Jean's newly discovered half-aunt
- Shailyn Pierre-Dixon as Mary Jones

== Reception ==
=== Critical response ===
On the review aggregator website Rotten Tomatoes, 75% of 8 critics' reviews are positive, with an average rating of 6.4/10.

Justin Chang of Variety remarked, "Meghie's endearingly acerbic debut feature is a work of modest ambition and commercial outlook, but that modesty proves intrinsic to its appeal, which deserves to be discovered at more stops along the festival circuit."

Sean L. Malin of The Austin Chronicle stated, "Highly visually controlled, snappily edited, and beautifully acted, Jean of the Joneses is a clever New York comedy about the Caribbean diaspora."

Michael Rechtshaffen of The Hollywood Reporter opined, "Meghie garners some terrific performances from her talented ensemble […]. But it's Paige who shines brightest here, dispensing just the right, gently jaded mix of dry wit and affecting vulnerability."
