= A Twisted Tale =

Disney-Hyperion book series

- Collection of the first twelve novels
- A Whole New World; Once Upon a Dream; As Old as Time; Reflection; Part of Your World; Mirror, Mirror; Conceal, Don't Feel; Straight On Till Morning; So This is Love; Unbirthday; Go the Distance; What Once Was Mine; Almost There; Set in Stone; When You Wish Upon A Star; Suddenly Super; A Twisted Tale Anthology; Fate Be Changed; Princess of Thieves; Sally's Lament; Be Prepared; Cruel Truth; How Far I'll Go; Adventure is Out There!; Nobody Gets Left Behind; Waiting on a Miracle
- Author: Liz Braswell; Jen Calonita; Elizabeth Lim; Farrah Rochon; Mari Mancusi; Keala Kendall; Anika Fajardo
- Country: United States
- Language: English
- Genre: Fantasy
- Publisher: Disney Publishing Worldwide: Disney • Hyperion
- Published: 2015-present
- Media type: Print (hardcover and paperback)

A Twisted Tale, also called Twisted Tales in editions with the complete series, is an anthology series of books based around alternate "What if" spins on Disney and Pixar animated films. They are published by Disney-Hyperion, and written by different authors, including Liz Braswell, Jen Calonita, Elizabeth Lim, and Farrah Rochon.

== Books ==
	Book Title	Based on	Scenario	Author	Release date	Pages
1	A Whole New World	Aladdin	"What if Aladdin had never found the lamp?"	Liz Braswell	September 1, 2015	400
2	Once Upon a Dream	Sleeping Beauty	"What if the Sleeping Beauty never woke up?"	Liz Braswell	April 5, 2016	448
3	As Old as Time	Beauty and the Beast	"What if Belle's mother cursed the Beast?"	Liz Braswell	September 6, 2016	484
4	Reflection	Mulan	"What if Mulan had to travel to the Underworld?"	Elizabeth Lim	March 27, 2018	416
5	Part of Your World	The Little Mermaid	"What if Ariel had never defeated Ursula?"	Liz Braswell	September 4, 2018	475
6	Mirror, Mirror	Snow White and the Seven Dwarfs	"What if the Evil Queen poisoned the prince?"	Jen Calonita	April 2, 2019	350
7	Conceal, Don't Feel (US) Let It Go (UK)	Frozen	"What if Anna and Elsa never knew each other?"	Jen Calonita	October 1, 2019	320
8	Straight On Till Morning	Peter Pan	"What if Wendy first traveled to Never Land with Captain Hook?"	Liz Braswell	February 4, 2020	496
9	So This is Love	Cinderella	"What if Cinderella never tried on the glass slipper?"	Elizabeth Lim	April 7, 2020	416
10	Unbirthday	Alice in Wonderland	"What if Wonderland was in peril and Alice was very, very late?"	Liz Braswell	September 1, 2020	512
11	Go the Distance	Hercules	"What if Meg had to become a Greek god?"	Jen Calonita	April 6, 2021	336
12	What Once Was Mine	Tangled	"What if Rapunzel's mother drank a potion from the wrong flower?"	Liz Braswell	September 7, 2021	496
13	Almost There	The Princess and the Frog	"What if Tiana made a deal that changed everything?"	Farrah Rochon	September 6, 2022	464
14	Set in Stone (Note: Available in AUS but no US release date at this time.)	The Sword in the Stone	"What if Arthur wasn't supposed to be king?"	Mari Mancusi	March 31, 2023 (UK)	368
15	When You Wish Upon A Star	Pinocchio	"What if the Blue Fairy wasn't supposed to help Pinocchio?"	Elizabeth Lim	April 4, 2023	480
16	Suddenly Super	The Incredibles	"What if Violet became an agent of Syndrome?"	Jen Calonita	August 31, 2023 (UK) April 6, 2027 (US)	368
17	Fate Be Changed	Brave	"What if the witch gave Merida a different spell?"	Farrah Rochon	April 2, 2024	464
18	Princess of Thieves	Robin Hood	"What if Maid Marian were the real outlaw?"	Mari Mancusi	September 5, 2024 (UK)	384
19	Sally's Lament	The Nightmare Before Christmas	"What if Sally discovered Christmas Town?"	Mari Mancusi	October 8, 2024	352
20	Be Prepared (Note: Available in the UK but no US release date at this time.)	The Lion King	"What if Nala was compelled to team up with Scar for a secret reason?"	Farrah Rochon	December 1, 2024 (AUS)	336
21	Cruel Truth	101 Dalmatians	"What if Anita and Cruella were best friends?"	Jen Calonita	May 1, 2025 (AUS)	400
22	How Far I'll Go	Moana	"What if Moana broke the heart of Te Fiti?"	Keala Kendall	September 2, 2025	400
23	Adventure is Out There!	Up	"What if it was Ellie who went up to Paradise Falls?"	Liz Braswell	April 7, 2026	400
24	Nobody Gets Left Behind	Lilo & Stitch	"What if Nani and Stitch had to join the Galactic Federation to keep their 'ohana together?"	Keala Kendall	March 1, 2026 (AUS)	400
25	Waiting on a Miracle	Encanto	"What if Mirabel and her sisters had to leave the Encanto?"	Anika Fajardo	September 1, 2026	400

== Anthologies ==
Book Title	Stories and bases	Scenario	Author	Release
A Twisted Tale Anthology (16 short stories total)	"Cast Out" (Snow White and the Seven Dwarfs)	"What if Snow White learned magic?"	Livia Blackburne	October 3, 2023
A Twisted Tale Anthology (16 short stories total)	"A First Mission" (Mulan)	"What if Mulan became the Emperor's advisor?"	Elizabeth Lim	October 3, 2023
A Twisted Tale Anthology (16 short stories total)	"Et Voilà" (Ratatouille)	"What if Remy had met Colette first?"	Liz Braswell	October 3, 2023
A Twisted Tale Anthology (16 short stories total)	"The Envelope" (Cinderella)	"What if Anastasia had a change of heart?"	Jen Calonita	October 3, 2023
A Twisted Tale Anthology (16 short stories total)	"A New Dawn" (The Lion King)	"What if Mufasa gave up his throne?"	Farrah Rochon	October 3, 2023
A Twisted Tale Anthology (16 short stories total)	"Rattle the Stars" (Treasure Planet)	"What if Jim Hawkins joined the pirates?"	M.K. England	October 3, 2023
A Twisted Tale Anthology (16 short stories total)	"A Royal Game of Chess" (Robin Hood)	"What if history wasn't quite right about the legend of Robin Hood?"	Liz Braswell	October 3, 2023
A Twisted Tale Anthology (16 short stories total)	"The Secret Exchange" (The Little Mermaid)	"What if Eric met Ariel after she rescued him?"	Elizabeth Lim	October 3, 2023
A Twisted Tale Anthology (16 short stories total)	"Dust to Dust" (Peter Pan)	"What if Tinker Bell was working for Captain Hook?"	Micol Ostow	October 3, 2023
A Twisted Tale Anthology (16 short stories total)	"Gonna Take You There" (The Princess and the Frog)	"What if Naveen had to get home to Maldonia?"	Farrah Rochon	October 3, 2023
A Twisted Tale Anthology (16 short stories total)	"Fates, Three" (Brave)	"What if the triplets visited the Witch?"	Jen Calonita	October 3, 2023
A Twisted Tale Anthology (16 short stories total)	"A Dragon in the Snow" (The Sword in the Stone)	"What if Madam Mim and Merlin went to school together?"	Kristina Pérez	October 3, 2023
A Twisted Tale Anthology (16 short stories total)	"The Journey Home" (Beauty and the Beast)	"What if Belle had to take her father's place at the fair?"	Farrah Rochon	October 3, 2023
A Twisted Tale Anthology (16 short stories total)	"Call It a Hunch" (Hercules)	"What if Hercules's first day as a god didn't go as planned?"	Jen Calonita	October 3, 2023
A Twisted Tale Anthology (16 short stories total)	"The Reluctant Prince" (Bambi)	"What if Bambi didn't want to be the next Great Prince of the Forest?"	Liz Braswell	October 3, 2023
A Twisted Tale Anthology (16 short stories total)	"The Rose and the Thorns" (Sleeping Beauty)	"What if Aurora knew the truth about her curse?"	Elizabeth Lim	October 3, 2023

== Graphic novels ==
A graphic novel version of the 2018 book Part of Your World, adapted by Stephanie Kate Strohm, was released on June 13, 2023. A graphic novel version of the 2020 book Straight On Till Morning, also adapted by Stephanie Kate Strohm, was released on June 11, 2024. A graphic novel version of the 2016 book As Old As Time, adapted by Beatrice Bassoli and Francesca Siviero, was released on May 6, 2025, and published on Webtoon on October 17. A graphic novel version of the 2022 book Almost There, adapted by Jamila Rowser, was also announced, though its release date is currently unknown.
