= The Nine Lives of Chloe King =

2011 American supernatural drama television series

- Genre: Action; Supernatural drama
- Based on: The Nine Lives of Chloe King series by Liz Braswell
- Developed by: Dan Berendsen
- Starring: Skyler Samuels; Amy Pietz; Grey Damon; Grace Phipps; Benjamin Stone; Alyssa Diaz; Ki Hong Lee
- Composer: Doug DeAngelis
- Country of origin: United States
- Original language: English
- No. of seasons: 1
- No. of episodes: 10

Production
- Executive producers: Dan Berendsen; John Ziffren; Leslie Morgenstein; Gina Girolamo
- Producers: Timothy Marx; Chris Grismer; Dan Dugan; Andy Reaser; David Hartle
- Cinematography: Michael Goi
- Editors: Timothy A. Good; Kristin Windell; David Crabtree; Harry Jierjian
- Camera setup: Film; Single-camera
- Running time: 42 minutes
- Production companies: Don't Borrow Trouble; Alloy Entertainment

Original release
- Network: ABC Family
- Release: June 14 – August 16, 2011

The Nine Lives of Chloe King is an American supernatural drama television series which premiered on ABC Family on June 14, 2011, and ended on August 16, 2011. The one-hour drama is based on the book series of the same name by Liz Braswell. The series follows Chloe King (Skyler Samuels), a girl who discovers that she is a descendant of an ancient race of Bastet offspring called the Mai, as she attempts to learn more about her cat-like powers with her friends and protectors, while also assuming the role of the "Uniter", a warrior that can stop the war between Mai and humans. Chloe is also bestowed with nine lives and must stay alive while dealing with her love life and the mysteries behind her missing father.

In September 2011, ABC Family announced its cancellation after one season.

== Premise ==
The protagonist, Chloe King, is a teenager who discovers on her sixteenth birthday that she has special cat-like powers, including nine lives, enhanced speed, strength, hearing, agility, night vision and the ability to extend her nails like cat claws, along with the ability to sense human emotions.

When Chloe realizes a mysterious figure is shadowing her, she goes on to uncover that she is a descendant of an ancient race called the Mai. She discovers she has nine lives and is told by Jasmine and Alek that she alone can protect the race from human assassins, who have hunted them for thousands of years.

== Characters ==
=== Main ===
The main cast of The Nine Lives of Chloe King

- Chloe King (Skyler Samuels) is a descendant of an ancient race called the Mai. She is believed to be the savior of the Mai race, with extra abilities and the gift of nine lives, making her the "Uniter", a warrior in a prophecy that states that she must save the world and both the Mai and Human races, and stop their war. She is originally from Ukraine, but was brought to the United States by the man who became her adoptive father and may have known of her powers.
- Alek Petrov (Benjamin Stone) is one of the descendants of the Mai race and Jasmine's cousin who reveals himself to Chloe to protect her. Alek's parents were killed by part of the order. Alek attempted to kiss Chloe in the first episode, but was stopped by Jasmine before he could. He acts as her protector, and helps keep her from harm. He has a habit of cracking jokes and teasing Chloe about aspects of the Mai's abilities and attributes. Alek eventually ends up falling in love with Chloe. In episode 7, Alek comes to Chloe, tells her that they belong together and kisses her and she kisses him back. Alek goes to Paul and seeks advice on how to woo Chloe. Paul reveals that there is nothing more important to Chloe than her friends. Later, Alek tells Chloe that he wants the duty of Chloe's protector to be removed so that if Chloe ever ends up in trouble he can be there because he wants to, not because he has to. It is revealed in the series finale that Zane is his brother.
- Meredith King (Amy Pietz) is the mother of Chloe King. Her husband found Chloe and decided to adopt her but later left her, making Meredith a single parent.
- Amy Tiffany Martins (Grace Phipps) is one of Chloe's best friends. She started dating Paul, the final member of the trio, in the first episode. They broke up briefly, but soon realized one fight was not enough to keep them apart.
- Paul Chun (Ki Hong Lee) is one of Chloe's best friends and is dating Amy. He is shown to be somewhat of a comic book geek, being very excited when Chloe develops her powers. He is the only one out of Chloe's group of human friends who believe from the beginning that her powers were a gift, not a curse, and demanded to be Chloe's 'sidekick'.
- Jasmine (Alyssa Diaz) is one of the descendants of the Mai race who seeks to protect Chloe, the savior of their race. Her mother Valentina is the leader of the San Francisco Mai. Throughout the first season, Jasmine reveals that she has struggled to earn her mother's approval. In the series finale Jasmine is stabbed by Zane and seemed to be dying next to her mother.
- Brian Rezza (Grey Damon) is a friend and love interest to Chloe and also the son of the man who is attempting to kill Chloe to wipe out the Mai civilization. He is referred to as "kitty hat" by Amy, because Chloe met Brian by selling him a hat with cat ears. Brian and Chloe have a very complicated relationship due to Chloe's inability to "get intimate" with humans, lest the human die or become paralyzed. Brian admits to loving Chloe, but Chloe tells him they are to be "just friends" Brian catches Chloe kissing Alek and becomes angered that she does not return his feelings. He continues to see Chloe as friends, which in turn angers Alek, who does not understand why Chloe still has feelings for Brian. Brian pushes and punches Alek, which deeply angers Chloe, due to her protection of friends. Brian tells her later that he acted so physically because "it was him," meaning that Alek was the one who had first wounded Chloe's and Brian's friendship. In the series finale, it appears that he dies because he kissed Chloe.

=== Recurring characters ===
- Valentina (Alicia Coppola) is Jasmine's mother, and the leader of all the Mai in San Francisco. According to Jasmine and Alek, she has killed fifteen members of the Order with her bare hands. She is the subject of Jasmine's frustration, due to her lack of attention towards her daughter. Valentina believes that Chloe must leave behind her human life in order to pursue her destiny, though after Chloe goes out of her way to help her friend and employer against an abusive ex-boyfriend, she states that Chloe is everything she expected of the Uniter and that it may be time for the Mai and the humans to stop living in separate worlds. In the series finale, she is seemed to be killed with a poison dart.
- Whitley Rezza (David S. Lee) is Brian's father, and a member of the Order. Throughout the first season, he proves to have more secrets than anyone Brian has ever known. Brian takes Chloe to an art exhibit with Mr. Rezza in the same room. Brian has no knowledge of his father's work; as well, Mr. Rezza and Brian know nothing about each other's connections to Chloe.
- Simone (Jolene Andersen) is Whitley Rezza's coworker. She seems to be the one who oversees all assassinations the Order makes. Simone also shows an interest in Whitley, which he returns throughout the first season.
- Frank Cabrera (Cristian de la Fuente) is Meredith's boyfriend as well as her employee. Meredith continues to see Frank until episode 9, in which both agree to stop the relationship until they sort out other personal relationships. He has a daughter, Vanessa, as well as an ex-wife.
- Lana Jacobs (Aeriél Miranda) is Chloe's boss at the clothing store where she works.
- The Rogue (Kiko Ellsworth), an assassin who tracks Chloe and attempts to kill her in the first three episodes of the series. He is killed by Valentina.
- Zane (Daniel Sharman), a member of the Order sent to befriend and kill Jasmine and her mother. He also claims to be Alek's brother.

== Mai ==
The Mai are an ancient race of supernatural beings, the mortal descendants of the ancient Egyptian cat goddess Bastet. Chloe learns she is a member of them on her sixteenth birthday.

=== History ===
The Mai once acted as defenders and companions of the human race, first as guardians for Egyptian pharaohs. Descendants of the Egyptian cat-goddess Bastet, the part-god, part-human Mai used their cat-like attributes to serve and advise humans. The Mai's role as protectors lasted until the 16th century BC when they were defeated by the Ramesses. The daughter of Ramesses III fell in love with a Mai, but the pharaoh banned their nuptials, so they eloped. When the humans and Mai learned of the union, the Mai boy was apprehended and killed by the Egyptians, causing the divide between the two races to grow deeper. As the Third Intermediate Period of Egypt began, the Mai were shunned from society and an organization called The Order emerged. The Order, a group of human assassins, began hunting the half-god race until they were nearly extinct. The fight between the Mai and the Order forced the Mai into hiding and is said to have been so violent, it is supposedly the cause of some of the world's most famous and bloodiest wars.

The Mai are also mortal enemies of the Jackals, a race descended from the Egyptian jackal-god Anubis. The Jackals are described as being filthy and savage, as well as the dregs of society. Ironically, the Mai display the same racist attitudes towards Jackals as The Order display towards the Mai themselves. According to Alek, every ancient god has offspring but only those two were introduced.

=== Present day ===
The Mai have now spread out worldwide, with Mai settlements in such places as New York City, Ukraine, San Francisco, São Paulo, Russia, and Hong Kong. Folklore predicts a "Uniter", a Mai born with nine lives, is the only one who will be able to end the Mai-Human war and restore balance between the two races. When Chloe is pushed from Coit Tower and is killed, but returns to life, her Mai peers Alek and Jasmine conclude she is the Uniter with eight remaining lives.

=== Characteristics ===
Because of their cat-like abilities, the Mai were natural protectors of the Egyptians and possess several abilities and gifts, and also several weaknesses. Traits include:

- Enhanced strength, dexterity, speed, and stamina
- Magnified reflexes and agility (allowing Mai to land on their feet after falling great distances)
- Increased healing and resistance to poison
- Heightened senses including hearing and smell
- Improved night vision
- Retractable claws

Any intimate actions between a Mai and a human is harmful to the human, resulting in the human's paralysis or death within a few hours. Only the Uniter can be resurrected, although each death will get more painful as time goes on. In addition to nine lives, the Uniter is also an Empath, able to detect and experience the emotions of humans. Chloe can feel other species' emotions, like the Jackals, but this does not work on the Mai. According to Valentina, all Mai once had this ability.

== Episodes ==
No.	Title	Directed by	Written by	Original release date	U.S. viewers (millions)
1	"Pilot"	Wendey Stanzler	Teleplay by : Dan Berendsen	June 14, 2011	2.17
On Chloe's 16th birthday, she and her friends, Amy and Paul, go to a dance club. At the club, Chloe meets a boy named Xavier and dances with him. Before she leaves, they share her first kiss, something she has been longing to do. A mysterious man begins to stalk her. The next day, she makes a perfect shot with a basketball, having taken it from an obnoxious jock, Alek. Alek later tries to kiss her, but his cousin, Jasmine, stops him. At her job, Chloe meets a boy named Brian and goes on a date with him. After dinner with Amy that night, Chloe almost gets mugged by a homeless man, but defends herself. She is chased by the stalker up to the top of a tower, where he shoves her off to her death. After dying from the fall, Chloe recovers and walks away. Alek and Jasmine reveal she is a Mai, one of a race with cat-like powers, like them, and that she is "The Uniter", the one Mai with nine lives who will save their race from human assassins. She also learns the Mai cannot be intimate with humans – it results in death. Paul calls Chloe, revealing he was kidnapped by the same man Chloe was killed by. Amy and Chloe drive to an abandoned warehouse, where Chloe receives help from Jasmine and Alek. Jasmine is wounded protecting Chloe from losing one of her remaining eight lives. Chloe gets a email from her missing father, warning her not to trust anybody. Brian is revealed to be the son of one of the men attempting to kill Chloe.
2	"Redemption"	Chris Grismer	Dan Berendsen	June 21, 2011	1.40
Chloe is feeling guilty over Xavier's death and goes to his funeral. She wants to make up for her part in it, although unknown to her, Brian's father and Chloe's assassin may have been involved in his death. Brian tells Chloe about his mother, who was murdered. Later, Chloe and Alek save Gabriel, Xavier's brother, from drug dealers. Alek warns Chloe that if she continues seeing Brian, one of them will get hurt. Chloe later decides to take her mother's advice about taking risks in life and talks to Brian on the phone. She hears a noise on her roof, dismissing it as Alek. Unknown to her, it is actually the assassin on her roof, waiting to catch Chloe at her weakest point.
3	"Green Star"	Joe Lazarov	Andy Reaser	June 28, 2011	1.43
Chloe meets Valentina (Alicia Coppola), Jasmine's mother and the leader of the San Francisco Mai. Valentina suggests that Chloe go into hiding to remain safe. The killer begins stalking Chloe's loved ones. After a talk with Valentina, Chloe is informed that the Mai and humans coexist, but just do not mix. Scarface, as dubbed by Chloe and her friends, steals Chloe's mother's cell phone and calls Chloe on it. Chloe agrees to give herself up. When she arrives, Scarface traps Chloe and throws her into the river to drown. As Chloe struggles, Jasmine arrives and fights him until Chloe is free of her ropes. They fight him together, but are eventually cornered, only for Valentina to kill Scarface. Chloe returns home and shares a moment with her mother.
4	"All Apologies"	Ron Lagomarsino	Mere Smith	July 5, 2011	TBA
Chloe adjusts to having sonic hearing and is getting certain vibes from people. Valentina tells her all Mai were empathic, but only the Uniter is now. Chloe and Amy get into a fight but eventually reconcile. The Order needs to figure out a new plan and Chloe has to protect her manager, Lana, from her abusive ex-boyfriend. Valentina pays Brian's dad a visit and gives him a warning. Chloe begins to embrace who she is.
5	"Girls Night Out"	Norman Buckley	Ron McGee	July 12, 2011	1.29
Chloe meets Nikki and Lilah, both members of the South American Mai. The two girls invite Chloe out for a night of dancing, which she accepts, but Jasmine is suspicious of their motives. Brian is upset that Whitley is forcing him to return to college. Chloe becomes frustrated with the casual way Nikki and Lilah view human life, potentially creating a divide between the different Mai prides.
6	"Nothing Compares 2 U"	Joe Lazarov	Yolanda E. Lawrence	July 19, 2011	1.26
Brian invites Chloe to the Rezza Art Gallery in hopes of taking things further. Alek takes his jealousy out by putting Chloe through aggressive training, and a new girl, Mimi, another Mai, moves into town, and is seen with Alek. Amy moves on from Paul, her ex-boyfriend, to a new student named Jonah, who turns out to be a gambler. It puts her into danger of being killed, and she calls Paul, who comes to the rescue with Chloe. Brian reveals to Chloe that he is falling in love with her. Chloe says that it isn't going to work out and runs away crying.
7	"Dogs of War"	Guy Bee	William H. Brown	July 26, 2011	1.19
Paul and Amy realize Alek has feelings for Chloe. Compassionate to the needs of others, Chloe is unable to turn her back on Kai (Colton Haynes), a grungy teen who asks Chloe for help in reuniting with his family. Although she eventually learns that Kai is a huge threat to the Mai's safety, Chloe insists on helping him. Accompanied by Alek, Jasmine, Paul and Amy, a determined Chloe begins the dangerous journey into Jackal territory. However, Chloe's mission takes a terrible turn and one Mai could be lost forever. Even though it has been ten years since Chloe's father vanished, Meredith still feels guilty about dating Frank. Meredith asks Chloe if she is okay with declaring her father dead, unaware that the two have been in contact. Alek tells Chloe that they belong together and the two kiss.
8	"Heartbreaker"	Marita Grabiak	Andy Reaser	August 2, 2011	0.96
Brian arrives just as Chloe and Alek kiss, and both boys leave angry. Chloe goes for a walk to clear her head and is brought home by the police after she interrupts what appears to be a robbery. Chloe and her mother go to the police station the next day to provide a description of the thieves, and Meredith learns that Chloe has been in contact with her father. Though their friendship is strained, Chloe provides Brian with information that may help him learn more about his mother. The thieves are in collusion with the detective on the case, and all three invade the King house. Chloe contacts Alek, and they put the criminals down. Meredith tries to contact Chloe's father herself.
9	"Responsible"	Joe Lazarov	Mere Smith	August 9, 2011	1.27
Frank and his daughter, Vanessa, come to the Kings' house for dinner. Vanessa is at first standoffish, but reveals to Chloe that she has a boyfriend, which her dad doesn't know about. Alek meets Jasmine's date, Zane, a visiting member of the New York pride. When Alek wants to show Chloe what she means to him, he instead finds himself having to deal with Brian, who is continuing to seek Chloe's help with learning about his mother. Vanessa runs away and Chloe tries to help locate her. They meet, and Vanessa says she is going on a long cruise. Paul suggests it is not a cruise, but human trafficking, and Chloe requests Alek's help. The two rescue Vanessa. Zane is revealed as a spy for the Order.
10	"Beautiful Day"	Chris Grismer	Ron McGee	August 16, 2011	1.08
After finding out his grandmother is alive, Brian and Chloe pay her a visit, where they learn more about Brian's father. After they leave, it is revealed that his grandmother really runs The Order and Simone works for her. Chloe gets a text, asking her to meet her father; Brian gives her a ride there and waits outside. Meredith has a big meeting with some investors; it turns out to be Brian's father, serving as a distraction so Chloe would be alone. The meeting is a trap, and Chloe has to fight for her life. After defeating three thugs, Simone blocks her way and shoots her. Brian finds her apparently dead and kisses her, declaring his love. Chloe returns to life but Brian's kiss has devastating consequences. Zane, who works for Simone, shoots Valentina with a slow-acting poison dart, which keeps her from dying until he can murder Jasmine in front of her. Alek returns to find both of them on the floor with Zane standing over them, who reveals he is Alek's brother. Paul and Amy find Chloe holding Brian, who is dead.

== Production ==
The show is written by Daniel Berendsen and is based on Alloy Entertainment's series of three young-adult books by Elizabeth J. Braswell (originally published under the pen name Celia Thomson). Alloy produced the series.

=== Promotion ===
In preparation for the premiere, ABCFamily.com rolled out "The Nine Paths to Chloe King", an online game encouraging users to uncover the secrets of the Mai and find The Uniter in order to unlock exclusive content and enter to win a chance to visit the set. Bloggers, or members of the Circle of Strangers, shared additional clues for the game, and users were encouraged to follow their sites as well as their Twitter feeds with the term #NinePaths.

== Reception ==
=== Critical response ===
The series has received mostly positive reviews, gaining a score of 68 out of 100 on Metacritic. Slate reviewer Troy Patterson praises the series, calling it "charming" while also observing that it covers familiar ground. Daily News writer David Hinckley writes "ABC Family wins with mix of teen romance, supernatural powers".

The pilot episode drew over 2 million viewers when it debuted in June 2011. The season, and ultimately the series finale had dropped about half of that initial audience, drawing just over 1 million viewers.

=== Awards and nominations ===
Year	Award	Category	Nominee(s)	Result
2011	Teen Choice Award	Choice Breakout Show	The Nine Lives of Chloe King	Nominated
2011	Teen Choice Award	Choice Breakout Star	Skyler Samuels	Nominated
2012	Saturn Award	Best Youth-Oriented Television Show	The Nine Lives of Chloe King	Nominated

== Television film ==
On January 9, 2012, during the Winter TCA Press Tour, ABC Family's president Michael Riley announced that the network was "on the verge of putting a [television] movie into development". On September 11, 2013, TV Guide revealed that the working title of the movie was The Nine Lives of Chloe King: Salvation, and that while it would not be filmed, Alloy Entertainment would release the script on September 13.
