= Katharine McGee =

American writer

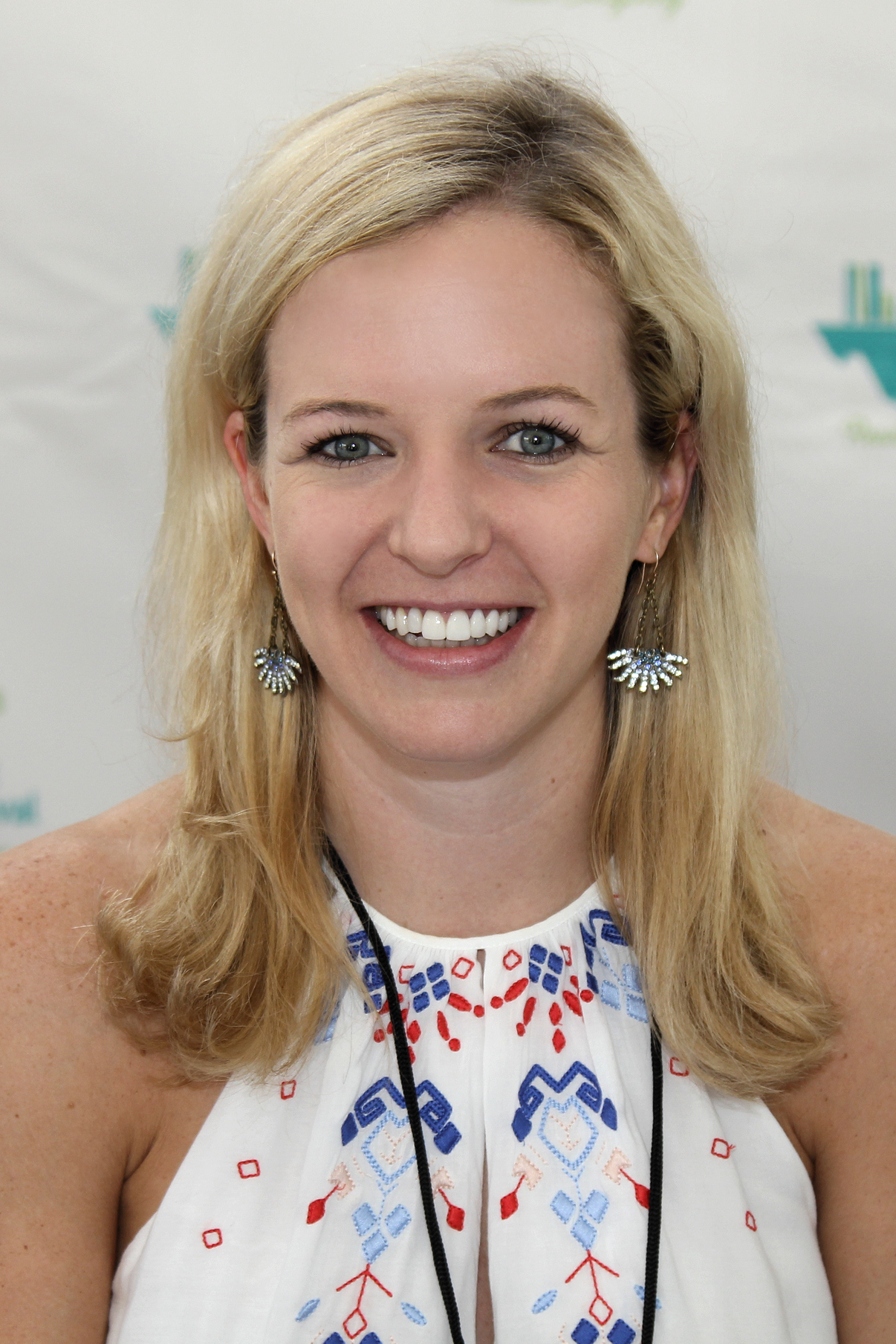
- McGee in 2018
- Education: Princeton University (BA); Stanford University (MBA)
- Occupation: Author
- Spouse: Alexander Field (m. 2016)
- Children: 3
- Writing career
- Period: 2016–present
- Notable work: American Royals

Katharine McGee is an American author. Her American Royals series was on the New York Times bestseller list in the Young Adults division.

== Education and career ==
Katharine McGee graduated from Princeton in 2010. She then worked in editorial at HarperCollins and at Alloy Entertainment, where she edited the last books in The Vampire Diaries series and the final book of the Pretty Little Liars series. While working at Alloy, she came up with the idea for her first book, The Thousandth Floor. She earned her MBA from the Stanford Graduate School of Business.

In 2019, McGee published her first book in the American Royals series. The series, initially expected to include two books, expanded into four (plus a prequel novella) and sold over half a million copies, putting it on the bestseller list.

== Personal life ==
In 2016, McGee married Alexander Field. The couple met as students at Princeton. They have three children.

== Bibliography ==
=== The Thousandth Floor ===
- The Thousandth Floor (2016), ISBN 0-062-41860-2
- The Dazzling Heights (2017), ISBN 0-062-41862-9
- The Towering Sky (2018), ISBN 0-062-41867-X

=== American Royals ===
- Inheritance (2022), ISBN 0-593-56784-6
- American Royals (2019), ISBN 1-984-83017-1
- Majesty (2020), ISBN 1-984-83021-X
- Rivals (2022), ISBN 0-593-42970-2
- Reign (2023), ISBN 0-593-71021-5

=== A Queen's Game ===
- A Queen's Game (2024)
- A Queen's Match (2025)
