= The Giving Keys =

Los Angeles-based jewelry company

- Industry: Retail
- Founded: 2008
- Founder: Caitlin Crosby
- Headquarters: Los Angeles, California, U.S.
- Products: Jewelry
- Website: www.thegivingkeys.com

The Giving Keys (TGK) is a Los Angeles-based jewelry company founded by singer-songwriter and actress Caitlin Crosby. Working to repurpose old & new keys into modern jewelry and accessories, The Giving Keys stamps inspiring words on keys and then creates necklaces, bracelets, and have in the past created rings, earrings, and iPhone cases with the engraved keys. Recipients of the accessories are encouraged to one day give their key away to someone who needs the message more than they do. The Giving Keys keeps an active blog of stories of customers who "pay it forward" and give their key away.

TGK employs local residents who are transitioning out of homelessness to create their product. TGK has partnered with Chrysalis, PATH, and United Way to support homeless populations in Los Angeles County. The Giving Keys is headquartered in Los Angeles, California, United States, and can be found in over 1200 retail locations worldwide, including Nordstrom, TOMS Marketplace, Kitson, Fred Segal, Anthropologie, Sevenly, and Altar'd State.

== History ==
The Giving Keys was founded in 2008. Founder Caitlin Crosby has detailed the origins of The Giving Keys in The Huffington Post and at a TEDx event (TEDxBend). Crosby took to wearing an old hotel key as jewelry and one day asked a locksmith to engrave the word LOVE on the key. As friends and fans took interest in her key, she decided to make her own line of key necklaces with inspiring words on them to sell at her concerts. Shortly after launching the jewelry line, Crosby attended a movie screening by Invisible Children in Hollywood. Touched by the experience, she struck up conversation with a homeless couple (named Rob and Cera) outside the movie theater after the film. Crosby offered to take the couple out for a meal and complimented Cera on her necklace. Cera mentioned that she designed it herself, and in a moment of impulse, Crosby invited the couple to be her business partners and help her produce her high-demand jewelry. Over the few years, the company has grown rapidly; as of August 2014 TGK has employed 19 people transitioning out of homelessness.

The Giving Keys has been featured on The Today Show, and in Elle, People, E! News, Last Call with Carson Daly, MTV, Relevant magazine, and The Huffington Post.

== Non-Profit Partnerships ==
The Giving Keys has partnered with a Los Angeles-based non-profit called Chrysalis. Chrysalis helps The Giving Keys select appropriate jewelry makers from their client database. In addition to supporting formerly homeless populations via Chrysalis, PATH and United Way, The Giving Keys has partnered with various cause-based charities to help them raise funds. Partnerships have included Invisible Children, Project Semicolon 31 Bits, Keep A Breast, So Worth Loving, Able Made, Liberty in North Korea, Not for Sale, and Saving Innocence.
