= Work It (film) =

2020 film by Laura Terruso

- Release poster
- Directed by: Laura Terruso
- Written by: Alison Peck
- Produced by: Alicia Keys; Leslie Morgenstein; Elysa Koplovitz Dutton
- Starring: Sabrina Carpenter; Liza Koshy; Keiynan Lonsdale; Michelle Buteau; Jordan Fisher
- Cinematography: Rogier Stoffers
- Edited by: Andrew Marcus
- Music by: Germaine Franco
- Production companies: A.K. Worldwide Productions; Alloy Entertainment; STXfilms
- Distributed by: Netflix
- Release date: August 7, 2020
- Running time: 93 minutes
- Country: United States
- Language: English

Work It is a 2020 American dance comedy film directed by Laura Terruso and written by Alison Peck. Produced by Alicia Keys, Leslie Morgenstein and Elysa Koplovitz Dutton, the film stars Sabrina Carpenter, Liza Koshy, Keiynan Lonsdale, Michelle Buteau and Jordan Fisher.

About a group of high school students of different backgrounds, the film follows their journey to win the titular Work It dance competition.

The film was released on Netflix on August 7, 2020.

== Plot ==
Quinn Ackerman, a quirky and intelligent high school senior, works as a technical director for the Thunderbirds, her high school's elite dance team, which is well known around the state as the reigning champions of the Work It dance competition. When Quinn sets something on fire by accident, the ruthless leader of the Thunderbirds, Julliard Pembroke, fires her from the position.

Quinn's dream to attend Duke University, her late father's alma mater, is soured when the admissions counselor, Veronica Ramirez, informs that her chances of standing out to the admission's team are not good. Quinn misleads Ramirez into thinking that she is a dancer on the Thunderbirds, even though she only worked the lighting. Ramirez is instantly impressed, and vows to see her perform live at the Work It dance competition.

Though she considers confessing, Quinn instead decides to commit to it. She enlists her best friend Jasmine Hale's help, who is a dancer for the Thunderbirds herself, to teach her how to dance for the team's open auditions in two weeks. Quinn's dancing skills improve substantially, but Julliard still rejects her.

After Jasmine stands up to him and defends Quinn, Julliard sarcastically suggests that the two start their own dance team, which Quinn does. Jasmine reluctantly agrees to quit the Thunderbirds in favor of Quinn's new team.

Quinn and Jasmine research a former champion of the Work It competition, Jake Taylor, who stopped competing and vanished after a knee injury two years prior. Quinn tracks him down and approaches him at the dance studio where he now works. She asks him to be a choreographer for the team, but Jake rejects her, insisting that dance is done with passion, not learned by thinking.

Meanwhile, the girls round up a group of unknown dancers at their school who all differ in style. After seeing the team's potential during an informal dance meetup, Jake agrees to choreograph for the team, but only if they can win entry through the upcoming qualifying competition by themselves. Under the name "TBD", they cut qualifiers but on a technicality issue with an opposing team.

Jake and Quinn spend more time together, and one night, Jake takes her aside and decides to experiment with freestyle dancing with her. As they practice, Quinn's talent surfaces, and they kiss. With newfound confidence, Quinn takes it easier on herself and puts more effort into her dancing and teamwork.

Quinn emails Veronica Ramirez and informs her that she has started her own team and that they will be competing at Work It. However, when Julliard discovers that Jake is choreographing for Quinn's team, he turns them in for using the studio to practice without paying, and Jake loses his job.

Quinn's grades drop due to her dedication to the team, and she receives an email from the Duke admissions team informing her that Veronica no longer works there. Quinn confesses everything to her mom, and they agree that she should quit the dance team and bring her grades up before turning in her final transcript.

The team feels betrayed by Quinn's departure, especially Jasmine, who rejoins the Thunderbirds, and Quinn ends her romance with Jake. She later rediscovers her own passion for dance and reconciles with him, and they both decide to bring the team back together. Quinn reconciles with Jasmine, who quits the Thunderbirds and rejoins the TBDs.

The group begins to learn each other's unique dance styles, and Jake incorporates them into the choreography. On competition day, Quinn's mother discovers that she is still into dance, so she tries to stop her from leaving and even grounds her. Quinn points out that going to Duke and becoming a doctor is her parents' dream and not hers, then takes the car keys and leaves.

When Quinn arrives, the TBDs are already on stage, and she enters halfway through the act. The TBDs narrowly win the competition over the Thunderbirds, and both Jasmine and Julliard are approached by a scout from the New York Dance Academy. Quinn runs into Veronica, who is now working at NYU, and she invites her to apply for the fall semester.

== Cast ==
- Sabrina Carpenter as Quinn Ackerman
- Liza Koshy as Jasmine Hale
- Keiynan Lonsdale as Julliard Pembroke
- Michelle Buteau as Veronica Ramirez
- Jordan Fisher as Jake Taylor
- Drew Ray Tanner as Charlie
- Jayne Eastwood as Ruthie (Nursing Home)
- Naomi Snieckus as Maria Ackerman
- Briana Andrade-Gomes as Trinity
- Kalliane Bremault as Brit Turner
- Bianca Asilo as Raven
- Neil Robles as Chris Royo
- Nathaniel Scarlette as DJ Tapes
- Tyler Hutchings as Robby G.
- Indiana Mehta as Priya Singh

== Production ==
On April 2, 2019, Adam Fogelson of STX announced the film along with Alicia Keys producing it. On May 2, 2019, it was announced that Sabrina Carpenter, Liza Koshy and Keiynan Lonsdale would star in the film. Laura Terruso was announced as the director, and that Terruso would rewrite the film from an original script from Alison Peck, with Elysa Koplovitz Dutton and Leslie Morgenstein from Alloy Entertainment producing the film alongside Keys. On July 2, 2019, Drew Ray Tanner, Michelle Buteau and Jordan Fisher all joined the cast and it was announced that Netflix would distribute the film. It was also announced that day that Carpenter would also serve as an executive producer.

Filming took place from June 2019 to August 2019 at the University of Toronto (St. George Campus), August 2019 to September 2019 in Winnipeg Manitoba at the University of Winnipeg, Canada and on the campus of California State University, Northridge in Los Angeles in December 2019.

== Soundtrack ==
=== Track listing ===
1. "Let Me Move You" - Sabrina Carpenter
2. "Wow" - Zara Larsson
3. "Thinkin Bout You" - Ciara
4. "I Am the Best" - 2NE1
5. "Do It Like This" - Daphne Willis
6. "Onset" - Haiku Hands featuring Mad Zach
7. "Motivation" - Normani
8. "Feeling It" - Danger Twins
9. "Break My Heart" - Dua Lipa
10. "Cool" - Dua Lipa
11. "Get on Your Feet" - Gloria Estefan
12. "Mess" - Jordan Fisher
13. "Treat Myself" - Meghan Trainor

== Release ==
Work It was released by Netflix on August 7, 2020. It was the top-watched film in its debut weekend, before falling to fifth place in its second weekend.

== Reception ==
On review aggregator Rotten Tomatoes, the film holds an approval rating of 85% based on 26 reviews, with an average rating of 6.2/10. On Metacritic, the film has a weighted average score of 58 out of 100, based on nine critics, indicating "mixed or average reviews".
