= Stella Meghie =

Canadian filmmaker

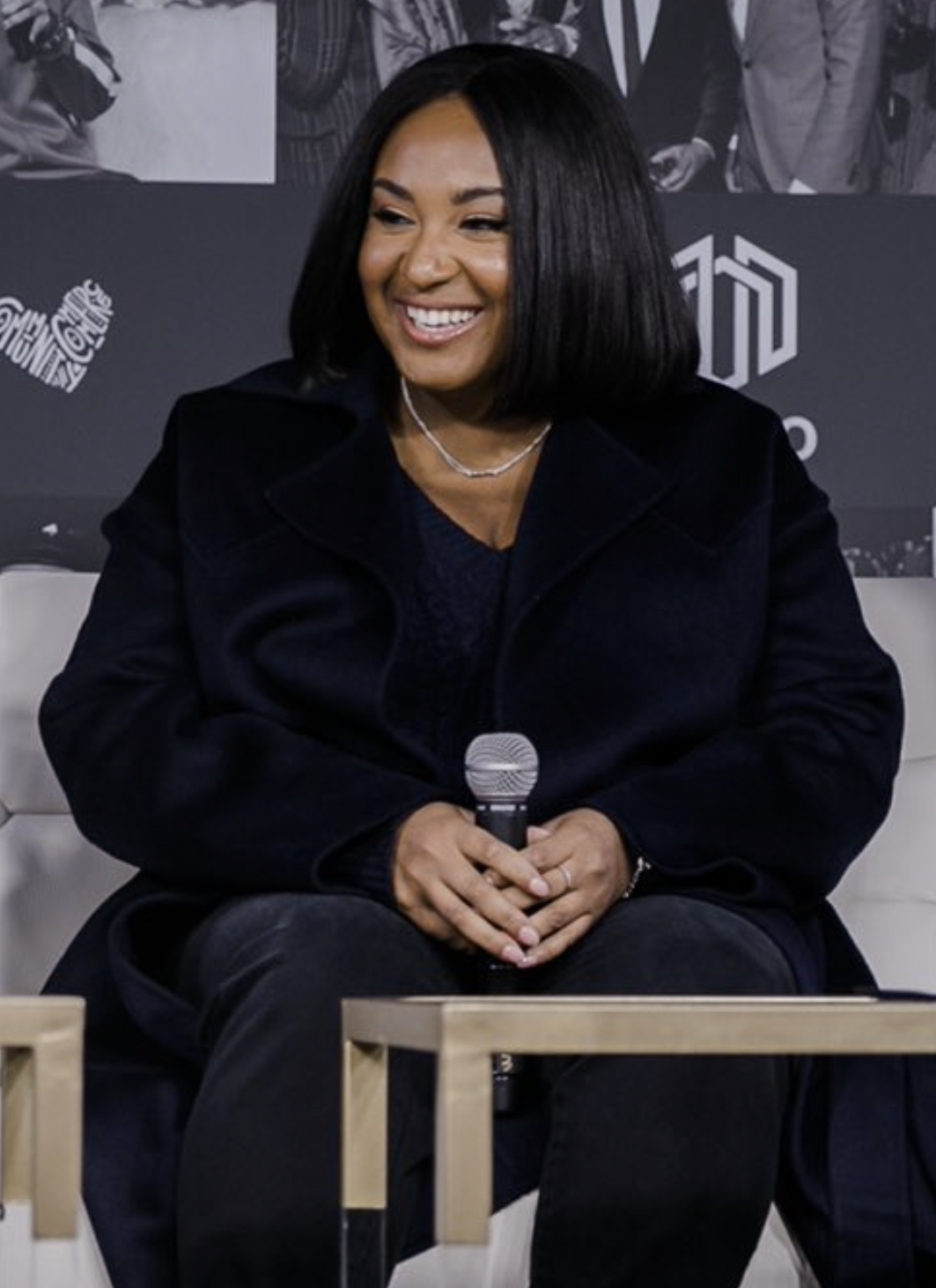
- Meghie in 2020
- Born: Toronto, Ontario, Canada
- Education: University of Waterloo; University of Westminster
- Occupations: Director, writer, producer
- Years active: 2012–present
- Known for: Jean of the Joneses, The Weekend, The Photograph

Stella Meghie is a Canadian film director and screenwriter. She is known for her feature films Jean of the Joneses (2016), Everything, Everything (2017), The Weekend (2018), and The Photograph (2020). Meghie has also directed episodes for television series including Grown-ish, Insecure, and First Wives Club.

For her debut feature, Meghie was nominated for Best First Screenplay at the Independent Spirit Awards. She has also received nominations from the Canadian Screen Awards and NAACP Image Awards.

== Early life ==
Meghie was born in Toronto, Ontario to Jamaican immigrant parents. She pursued a degree in writing at the University of Waterloo, before beginning a career as a public relations agent in New York City's fashion industry. In 2007, she quit her job to return to school and received a degree in screenwriting from the University of Westminster.

== Career ==
In 2016, Meghie made her feature film debut with the indie comedy-drama Jean of the Joneses which premiered at the SXSW Film Festival. The film received a nomination for Best First Screenplay at the Independent Spirit Awards and two Canadian Screen Award nominations at the 5th Canadian Screen Awards in 2017. Meghie was also nominated in the Best Original Screenplay category.

After her first picture, Meghie began work on studio features. She directed the romance film Everything, Everything (2017), an adaptation of the New York Times best selling novel Everything, Everything. The film starred Amandla Stenberg and Nick Robinson and was a commercial success, grossing $61 million worldwide on a production budget of $10 million.

Marking her return to indie features, Meghie's film The Weekend premiered at the 2018 Toronto International Film Festival. The indie film was shot in just under two weeks from a script Meghie had written years prior.

In 2020, Meghie directed her fourth feature film, The Photograph. The film was inspired by Meghie's own grandmother who reconnected with a daughter she had not seen in almost thirty years. Starring Issa Rae and Lakeith Stanfield, the film received generally favourable reviews and grossed $20 million.

Meghie was slated to direct a Whitney Houston biopic for Sony Pictures titled Whitney Houston: I Wanna Dance with Somebody from a screenplay written by Anthony McCarten and with Naomi Ackie set to star as Houston. Kasi Lemmons ultimately took over directing duties though Meghie remained an executive producer.

On March 14, 2022, Meghie signed with Lighthouse Management + Media for representation.

Meghie is also set to executive-produce The Princess and the Frog spin-off series Tiana. She was also originally hired as writer and director, but was replaced in those capacities by Joyce Sherri by October 2023, before the series was ultimately cancelled in March 2025.

On February 22, 2023, it was announced that Meghie would direct multiple episodes of the Disney+ series Wonder Man, set in the Marvel Cinematic Universe.

== Filmography ==
=== Feature films ===
Year	Film	Credited as				Notes
Year	Film	Director	Writer	Producer	Other	Notes
2016	Jean of the Joneses	Yes	Yes	Yes	No	
2017	Everything, Everything	Yes	No	No	No	
2018	The Weekend	Yes	Yes	Yes	No	
2020	The Photograph	Yes	Yes	No	No	
2021	Encanto	No	No	No	Yes	Creative leadership
2022	Whitney Houston: I Wanna Dance with Somebody	No	No	Executive	No	

=== Television ===
Year	Title	Credited as		Episode(s)
Year	Title	Director	Producer	Episode(s)
2018-2019	Grown-ish	Yes	No	"Bitch, Don't Kill My Vibe", "Fake Love"
2017	Insecure	Yes	No	"Fresh-Like", "Lowkey Movin' On"
2018	First Wives Club	Yes	No	"The Glow Up"
2022	Minx	Yes	No	"You happened to me"
2026	Wonder Man	Yes	No	Post-production

== See also ==
- List of University of Waterloo people
