= Samurai Girl (book series) =

Book series by Carrie Asai

- Author: Carrie Asai
- Language: English
- Series: Samurai Girl (book series)
- Subject: Samurai, Teenagers
- Genre: Fiction, Young Adult
- Publisher: Simon Pulse
- Publication date: June 1, 2003
- Publication place: United States
- Media type: Paperback

Samurai Girl is a series of six novels by author Carrie Asai. It tells the story of Heaven Kogo, who as a baby was the lone survivor of a plane crash and was adopted by the wealthy Kogo family. At age nineteen, she is arranged to marry Teddy Yukemura, but her wedding is crashed by a ninja that kills her brother. She escapes to find out her lavish life and family isn't what she thought it was and must train under her brother's friend, Hiro, the ways of the samurai to protect herself and loved ones.

On September 5, 2008, ABC Family aired a six-hour mini-series based on the series. It starred Jamie Chung, Brendan Fehr, and Stacy Keibler

Besides Heaven's perspective in the story, the books include illustrations, newspaper reports, and other characters' entries. The back covers of the books include the same short description for the series, followed by another description for the specific book.

== Characters ==
- Heaven Kogo
- Ohiko Kogo
- Konishi Kogo
- Mieko Kogo
- Takeda "Teddy" Yukemura
- Hiro Uyemoto
- Karen
- Cheryl
- Jake
- Otto
- And many more characters

== Novels ==
Book Number	Title	Publication Date	Pages
01	The Book of the Sword	June 1, 2003	224
02	The Book of the Shadow	June 1, 2003	215
03	The Book of Pearl	September 1, 2003	240
04	The Book of Wind	November 1, 2003	224
05	The Book of Flame	December 30, 2003	224
06	The Book of Heart	March 2, 2004	215

== See also ==
- Samurai Girl (miniseries)
