= Samurai Girl (miniseries) =

- Written by: Luke McMullen; Bryan Oh; Meredith Averill; Mimi Won Techentin
- Directed by: Pat Williams
- Starring: Jamie Chung; Brendan Fehr; Stacy Keibler; Jack Yang; Anthony Wong
- Country of origin: United States
- Original language: English
- No. of episodes: 6

Production
- Producer: Bob Levy
- Cinematography: Joel Ransom
- Editors: Darla Ellerman; Richard Schwadel
- Production companies: Space Floor Television; Alloy Entertainment; ABC Studios

Original release
- Network: ABC Family
- Release: September 5 – September 7, 2008

Samurai Girl is a six-hour miniseries loosely based on the popular young-adult novel series by Carrie Asai. The event stars Jamie Chung, Brendan Fehr, and Stacy Keibler. The series began its three-day premiere on ABC Family on September 5, 2008.

== Premise ==
This story follows Heaven, who at six months old was the sole survivor of a deadly plane crash. The press named her Heaven, because it seemed that she fell from the sky. Soon after, she was adopted by the powerful Kogo Family and lived a very privileged life. But 19 years later, things take an unexpected turn, when her wedding is attacked and her brother, Ohiko, is killed trying to save her, not before warning her that the Yakuza have infiltrated her family. She breaks free from her family and begins training to be a samurai and fight back against the Yakuza.

== Plot ==
=== Part 1 ===
Heaven sneaks maple glazed donuts into the compound and is startled by Hiko. Hiko tells Heaven that he is leaving to go to stay with his friend Jake in San Francisco and gives Heaven a necklace as a birthday present.

One year later, we find that Heaven's about to be wed to Teddy Yukimura. But as the wedding takes place, Yakuza ninjas attack her wedding. Her brother is killed trying to protect her, and her father is shot. Later, she goes to a party where she sees the hostess dumping her boyfriend. The next morning, the hostess Cheryl finds Heaven hiding in her closet. With Cheryl's friend Otto's help, Heaven finds Jake and find that Hiko left her a bag containing a fake passport to a Zen monastery in Indonesia. But, against Hiko's wishes, she returns to the Kogo Towers Hotel. As she is trying to access her fathers files, she is discovered by the maid and takes off running with the laptop and is rescued by Jake.

Later on, Heaven calls Otto to help access the laptop without a password and is able to access surveillance videos to find that her limo driver, Noriyuki, is being beaten up. As they are trying to find the source, the files are deleted but not before discovering that it came from a nightclub. Heaven and Jake head to the nightclub to rescue Noriyuki but are ambushed. After the ambush, they find Noriyuki as he was about to perform Seppuku. When they return to Jake’s loft, Heaven gives Noriyuki a package containing money to escape. Then he tells Heaven about a legend that involves her.

=== Part 2 ===
Heaven begins training with Jake. Soon after, she discovers that Jake was a former Yakuza ninja and asks Jake to find the ninja that killed Hiko. When Heaven goes to the supermarket, she encounters a man named Severin, who tells her that he was building a case against her father and the Yakuza and asks her to return home. While at Cheryl's house to check her e-mail, two Yakuza ninjas attack. Cheryl, Otto and Heaven flee to Jake's loft. During a battle with the master assassin, Heaven discovers that her father organized the attack at the wedding. Severin again meets up with Heaven to tell that her necklace was also a tracking device and that he needs her help to take down her father's empire. After which Heaven agrees to return home.

=== Part 3 ===
As Heaven is set to return home, Severin warns her that her father is a dangerous man. But she is still convinced that her father is innocent. Then Severin tells her that her father had murdered Teddy's father, Yuji Yukimura. She returns home and discovers that she is a part of an ancient prophecy. With the help of Severin, Cheryl, and Otto, Heaven sneaks into her father's office and steals the documents about the prophecy. After a meeting with Heaven's father, Teddy tells Heaven about the prophecy while he is preparing to leave.

=== Part 4 ===
On the way back from Hiko's funeral, Sato tells Tasuke that her daughter was a spy and were heading to an unknown location when Jake rescues her and takes her back to the hotel to retrieve the sword. To avoid being seen by her father, Heaven and Jake share a long fake kiss. When they finally get back to Jake's loft, they find that Karen, who is Jake's ex-fiancée, has returned to the house. Heaven feels furiously jealous that Jake has a fiancée after they just shared their "first kiss." After Severin reviews the text, he hands it to a former professor to have it translated: He tells her that a secret decoder written on a series of bones sits at the Japanese consulate. So Heaven, Severin, and Cheryl head over to retrieve the bones.

After retrieving the bones, they discover that a piece of the prophecy is within the Sierra Nevada mountains. So Heaven and Severin set out to get that piece. Jake joins them but they discover that Sato and his men have started on the trail, so they climb up the face of Mount Kyra. While Dr. Fleming (who Cheryl has a crush on) examines the artifacts, Karen sneaks into his office and kills him. Meanwhile, two of the carabiners break free, pulling Jake and Severin down. Severin tells Heaven to cut one of them loose or lose both of them.

=== Part 5 ===
Part 5 opens with Severin and Jake yelling at Heaven to cut either of their ropes. Heaven reluctantly cuts Jake's rope sending him falling backward down the mountain. Heaven stays frozen until Severin orders her to climbing so that Jake wouldn't have died in vain. However, Heaven and Severin are not successful in gaining the mirror and return home with nothing. Soon after, Jake, who survived the fall, returns with the mirror and a captured Sato. Otto and Cheryl tell Heaven of Karen's true identity, and Heaven becomes suspicious of her (without evidence) and refuses to confront Jake. After a botched sting operation to uncover Tasuke's money launderer, known only as Sonia, Karen stabs Sato and cuts herself to make it look like he escaped.

=== Part 6 ===
After stabbing Jake, Karen beats up Heaven and kidnaps Cheryl. After seeing Jake at the hospital, she leaves for a location outside Kyoto, Japan. Meanwhile, Severin is interrogating Tasuke, who was arrested in a planned sting, during which he tells the history of the Morishi Protocol which included an underground bidding war. Heaven ends up killing Jake's ex and survives the Morishi Protocol even though her destiny was to die in the end for a person to survive. Heaven, Cheryl, and Severin return to the loft to find that Jake left. Five months later, we find Heaven working as a waitress. Otto brings Heaven a letter from Jake. At the end, on the way home, Heaven comes across Sato and is quickly surrounded by a gang of ninjas and she prepares to fight them.

== Promotion ==
On the second day of the 2008 San Diego Comic-con, the cast and crew promoted the movie by signing autographs and participated in a question and answer session with attendees.

== Cast ==
- Jamie Chung as Heaven Kogo
- Brendan Fehr as Jake Stanton
- Saige Thompson as Cheryl
- Kyle Labine as Otto
- Anthony Brandon Wong as Tasuke Kogo
- Kenneth Choi as Sato
- Steven Brand as Severin
- Stacy Keibler as Karen
- Linda Ko as Mieko Kogo
- Zen Shane Lim as Teddy
- Sab Shimono as Noriyuki
- Jack Yang as Hiko Kogo
- Jennifer Chung as Security Tech
- Yulin Hswen as Servant
- Paul Wu as Master Ninja
- Toshi Haraguchi as Yukimura
- Kwesi Ameyaw as Surgeon
- Warren Christie as Dr. Thomas Fleming
- Jeffrey Parazzo as Bartender
- Byron Lawson as Tough
- Jasmine Chan as Young girl
- Apollonia Vanova as Seaya
- Jim K. Chan as Visa Clerk
- Nicole Fraissinet as Joanne
- Shannon Chan-Kent as Attendant
- Kendall Cross as Female Paramedic
- John Hainsworth as Painting Man
- Jason Diablo as Male Paramedic
- Darryl Quon as Sumo
- Peter Kawasaki as Priest
- Silver Kim as Shady Man
- William MacDonald as Detective
- Adam Thomas as Greek God
- Stephanie Penikett as Vampire
- Daniel Boileau as Bartender
- Hector Johnson as Bulky Guard
- Tom Tames as Drunk Hipster
