= Everything, Everything (novel) =

2015 novel by Nicola Yoon

- Author: Nicola Yoon
- Language: English
- Genre: Young adult fiction
- Published: 1 September of 2015
- Publisher: Delacorte Books
- Publication place: United States
- Media type: Print (hardback, paperback), e-book, audiobook
- Pages: 310 pages

Everything, Everything is the debut young adult novel by Jamaican-American author Nicola Yoon, first published by Delacorte Books for Young Readers in 2015. The novel centers on 18-year-old Madeline Whittier, who is being treated for severe combined immunodeficiency (SCID), also known as "bubble baby disease". Due to this, Madeline is kept inside her house in Los Angeles, where she lives with her mother, a doctor.

== Plot ==
The story follows 18-year-old Madeline Whittier, also known as Maddy, a half-Japanese, half-African-American who is being treated for severe combined immunodeficiency (SCID), and therefore is not allowed to leave her house or interact with anything that has not been "sanitized". Her world consists of her doctor mother Pauline, her nurse Carla, and the books she finds comfort in; her father and brother died a long time ago in a car accident.

Maddy's life changes when a family moves in next door. She watches them from the window and learns that the family includes a father, mother, daughter named Kara, and a son named Olly. Olly befriends Maddy, and the two begin to message each other online. Meanwhile, Olly's father is abusive and Kara has a smoking problem.

One day, Carla sneaks Olly into Maddy's house, and the two meet face to face for the first time. They begin meeting at her house regularly, and at one point, Maddy even goes outside for a few seconds. When Pauline discovers this, she fires Carla and bans Maddy from ever seeing Olly again, but they continue secretly talking. One day, Pauline shows Maddy a photo of their family in Maui, Hawaii, when Maddy was only months old. Influenced by this photo, Maddy decides to risk it all and go to Hawaii with Olly. Olly initially disagrees, but Maddy lies that she‘s on a new medicine that will keep her from getting sick, convincing him.

The two go to Hawaii, explore the islands, and consummate their relationship. The next day, Maddy has to be taken to a hospital because she wakes up extremely sick.

Pauline brings her home and hires Carla again to take care of her. Maddy eventually recovers. She stops emailing Olly as she doesn't want to miss him and the world. A month later, Maddy sees Olly, Kara, and their mother loading their belongings into a moving van while their father is at work, escaping his tyranny.

2 months after the travel to Hawaii, Maddy gets a letter from the doctor who treated her when she got sick there, and in the note, the doctor says she thinks that Maddy doesn’t have SCID, and she got sick because she had spent her whole life inside and has never formed a natural immunity. The doctor blames myocarditis as the reason for Maddy's heart-stopping. Maddy, angry and panicked, searches her mother's medical files but doesn’t find the test results or doctor's notes that would confirm she had SCID. Instead, she finds some notes Pauline wrote and a few articles about SCID from the Internet. She confronts her, who breaks down and indirectly admits that she doesn’t have SCID. Maddy tells Carla, who says she had always suspected that her mom hadn't completely recovered from the death of her husband and son.

Pauline says that right after the car accident, Maddy got very sick and, not wanting to lose her, decided to think she had SCID and needed to be kept away from the world. Maddy is angered and can't bring herself to forgive her. Maddy flies to New York, where she sends Olly on a mini scavenger hunt that leads him to a used bookstore where she is waiting for him.

== Reception ==
A reviewer for The Guardian wrote about the book: "The way the author describes Madeline's world using such beautiful imagery makes the reader appreciate the little things in life".

== Film adaptation ==
The novel was adapted into a feature film. In July 2016, it was announced that Amandla Stenberg would play Madeline Whittier and Nick Robinson would play opposite Stenberg as Olly. Stella Meghie directed the film, and J. Mills Goodloe wrote the script. In February 2017, Warner Bros. debuted the trailer. The film was released on May 19, 2017.
