= List of The King of Queens episodes =

The King of Queens is an American television sitcom created by Michael J. Weithorn and David Litt and starring Kevin James and Leah Remini, that premiered on CBS on September 21, 1998, and ended on May 14, 2007. A total of 207 episodes were produced, spanning nine seasons.

== Series overview ==
Season	Episodes	Originally released		Rank	Viewers (in millions)
Season	Episodes	First released	Last released	Rank	Viewers (in millions)
1	25	September 21, 1998	May 17, 1999	35	12.5
2	25	September 20, 1999	May 22, 2000	34	12.7
3	25	October 2, 2000	May 21, 2001	27	13.4
4	25	September 24, 2001	May 20, 2002	19	13.9
5	25	September 23, 2002	May 19, 2003	25	13.0
6	24	October 1, 2003	May 19, 2004	30	11.1
7	22	October 27, 2004	May 18, 2005	48	9.8
8	23	September 19, 2005	May 22, 2006	49	10.0
9	13	December 6, 2006	May 14, 2007	30	11.4

== Episodes ==
=== Season 1 (1998–99) ===
No. overall	No. in season	Title	Directed by	Written by	Original release date	Prod. code	Viewers (millions)
1	1	"Pilot"	Pamela Fryman	Michael J. Weithorn & David Litt	September 21, 1998	100	14.23
In the pilot episode, Doug (Kevin James) and Carrie Heffernan (Leah Remini) were happy. Doug had just gotten the perfect basement with a large TV and foosball table. However, Carrie's father, Arthur Spooner (Jerry Stiller), accidentally burns his own house down with his "lucky" hot plate after his wife died. As a result both he and Carrie's sister Sara (Lisa Rieffel) have to move in with Doug and Carrie. Doug therefore loses his basement to his father-in-law. During this time, Doug finds living in his house frustrating after both Arthur and Sara make him late for work.
2	2	"Fat City"	Robert Berlinger	Cathy Yuspa & Josh Goldsmith	September 28, 1998	102	12.67
Stunned by an old photograph of Carrie's mother, Doug convinces Carrie to go on a diet and must pretend he is going on one too.
3	3	"Cello, Goodbye"	Gail Mancuso	Michael J. Weithorn & David Litt	October 5, 1998	104	12.01
When Carrie keeps skipping softball games with Doug and the guys, Doug wonders what's going on. Doug finds out that Carrie is working late for her boss, and he's starting to wonder why Carrie fell for him. He tries to make it up to Carrie by going to a cello concert with her.
4	4	"Richie's Song"	Robert Berlinger	Tony Sheehan	October 12, 1998	103	11.22
After having dinner with Richie (Larry Romano) and his wife, Doug finds out that Richie's wife cheats on him, he must confront him with the news. However, Doug has some trouble telling his friend about his wife, afraid that he will hurt him and finally tells him in Atlantic City while gambling. Meanwhile, Arthur depends on Doug for deodorant issues, but Doug is too distracted.
5	5	"Paternal Affairs"	Brian K. Roberts	David Bickel	October 19, 1998	105	10.77
Doug and Carrie throw a wedding anniversary party for themselves. Doug invites his Aunt Sheila (Brenda Vaccaro), and finds out that his aunt and uncle are having problems. When Arthur meets Doug's aunt, he falls for her. Carrie eventually lets him date her but ends up regretting it, leaving Arthur with plans to propose to her.
6	6	"Head First"	Pamela Fryman	Michael J. Weithorn & David Litt	October 26, 1998	101	13.23
After a stressful day of working and accompanying Arthur on errands, Doug receives a "very special thank you" in the form of oral sex from Carrie. Doug realizes that if he spends more time with Arthur, Carrie might keep "thanking" him. Doug soon pretends to be very good friends with Arthur, but his plan backfires after Arthur clings to him and harasses his friends.
7	7	"The Rock"	Pamela Fryman	Stacie Lipp	November 2, 1998	106	12.66
Carrie is offered a large sum of money to sell her engagement ring. Doug and Carrie decide to sell it and buy a hot tub and satellite dish. When Doug first tries out the new channels he is determined to see all the channels and grows to dislike the dish. Meanwhile, Doug and Carrie find trouble with their new hot tub when Arthur starts to ruin their time by putting up the heat and using it without any undergarments.
8	8	"Educating Doug"	Rob Schiller	Cathy Yuspa & Josh Goldsmith	November 9, 1998	108	13.04
Carrie feels that she and Doug are getting stupid as a couple, so she enrolls them and Spence (Patton Oswalt) for a class where they read a book and then discuss it, but Doug fails and steals Spence's answers.
9	9	"Road Rayge"	Rob Schiller	Tony Sheehan & David Litt	November 16, 1998	107	14.16
Doug allows Ray Barone (Ray Romano from Everybody Loves Raymond), a sportswriter to cheat off his test during a driving exam at the DMV and gets his license suspended. Ray attempts to make it up to him by taking him to a New York Jets game with his brother Robert (Brad Garrett). On the drive home, Ray convinces Doug to drive his car but it makes Robert jealous and finds out that Doug does not have a license to drive and pulls him over. After Doug finally passes his driving test he gets hit by Ray's dad's (Peter Boyle) car and Doug gets hurt.
10	10	"Supermarket Story"	Rob Schiller	Cathy Yuspa & Josh Goldsmith	November 23, 1998	109	13.70
While looking for a parking space, Carrie steals a parking space from a woman named Helen (Christine Rose), whom the former later needs help from to make a Thanksgiving dinner. Doug finds his friend, Richie in the lines and is having trouble getting out. Doug also meets up with someone he does not know but claims to know him and manages to have conversations with him and finally invites him to dinner when he somehow insults him. Arthur is upset when he finds out Carrie plans to use TV dinners as a Thanksgiving dinner and convinces her to make a good feast from scratch. He also meets a love interest who was giving away free samples. The show ends with Doug, Carrie, and Arthur in line for check-out with Richie somehow behind them.
11	11	"Noel Cowards"	Rob Schiller	David Bickel & Michael J. Weithorn	December 14, 1998	112	13.39
At Christmas time, Arthur buys Doug and Carrie a very squatty, mini car, which, of course, Doug and Carrie dislike. Richie advises Doug and Carrie to abandon the car in an area where it will most likely be stolen, but they hesitate because it was a gift from Carrie's father.
12	12	"Fixer Upper"	Rob Schiller	Tony Sheehan & David Litt	December 21, 1998	110	10.89
Carrie arranges a date with a work friend and Spence, but after a saucy piece of advice from Doug, Spence scares the girl off.
13	13	"Best Man"	Rob Schiller	Cathy Yuspa & Josh Goldsmith	January 11, 1999	113	15.61
Doug, Carrie, Deacon (Victor Williams) and Kelly (Merrin Dungey) attend a wedding of a man Carrie had sex with once, but Doug did not know until right before the wedding and he does not tell Carrie he knows. Guest star: Peter Tork (of the Monkees) as the band leader
14	14	"Dog Days"	Rob Schiller	David Litt	January 18, 1999	114	15.13
The Heffernans' neighbors the Sackskys (Bryan Cranston and Dee Dee Rescher) have an annoying barking dog. Doug and Carrie complain about it, but Doug feels sorry for the dog when he finds out that all he needs are walks and secretly adopts it. Arthur thinks "Charlie Brown" is based on him.
15	15	"Crappy Birthday"	Mark Cendrowski	Story by : Kevin James & Gary Valentine & Rock Reuben; Teleplay by : David Bickel	February 1, 1999	111	12.48
Doug subscribes for an ultimate fight on television, not realizing it falls on the same night as Carrie's birthday. Luckily for Doug, Carrie is depressed about her new age, so Doug makes up a lie about having plans so he can sound like he remembered. Doug invites Deacon and Kelly, but in bad timing when Deacon's mother comes to visit. During the course of the celebration, several things go wrong such as Doug forgetting a card and having dinner outside in the cold.
16	16	"S'Ain't Valentine's"	Rob Schiller	Story by : David Bickel; Teleplay by : Nancy Cohen & David Bickel & Michael J. Weithorn	February 8, 1999	117	12.58
On Valentine's Day, Arthur attends a party at his senior center and meets a woman Mary (Jerry Stiller's real-life wife Anne Meara) and the two begin a love affair. Carrie is waiting for Doug at restaurant but Doug is stuck at Spence's birthday party, but when Spence arrives, he and his mother (Grace Zabriskie) get into a fight and Doug, Deacon and Richie are stuck at his home with Spence's mother; while waiting for Doug, Carrie meets a "schmuck" (Shaun Weiss) at the restaurant and transforms him to be more charming. Note: This is the only episode in which Grace Zabriskie plays Spence's mother. For subsequent episodes of the series, she was replaced by Anne Meara, who also guest stars in this episode with Amy Stiller.
17	17	"Court Date"	Rob Schiller	Cathy Yuspa & Josh Goldsmith	February 15, 1999	116	13.72
Carrie is asked out on a date by a police officer (Daniel Roebuck) who pulled her over the previous day (she was wearing gloves and therefore the police officer could not see her ring). After getting some advice from Richie, Doug gets Carrie to go on a date with him so he will not testify against her.
18	18	"White Collar"	Rob Schiller	Story by : Dan E. Fesman & Harry Victor; Teleplay by : Tony Sheehan	February 22, 1999	118	11.79
Doug gets promoted after the sudden severe illness of his manager at IPS. Carrie gets excited but Doug hates the job, feeling guilty when Deacon says he wanted the promotion.
19	19	"Rayny Day"	Rob Schiller	David Bickel	March 1, 1999	119	11.89
Doug invites Richie over to talk to him about his recent divorce, but in the last minute Doug bails to play golf with sportswriter Ray Barone. Meanwhile, while Doug and Ray are playing golf, Ray's mother Marie (Doris Roberts) keeps Carrie company.
20	20	"Train Wreck"	Rob Schiller	Story by : Ira Fritz & Neal Howard and Cathy Yuspa & Josh Goldsmith; Teleplay by : Cathy Yuspa & Josh Goldsmith	March 15, 1999	120	13.33
Doug gets paired together with Julie Patterson (Julie Benz), a new trainee, whom he's attracted to and is afraid to tell Carrie. As always, Carrie finds out, but she does not care because she thinks of Doug as "nice". Angered by this, Doug tries to get his trainee to sexually harass him. Meanwhile, Arthur has his own millennium problem with a tombstone.
21	21	"Hungry Man"	Rob Schiller	Tony Sheehan	April 5, 1999	115	11.61
Carrie's boss invites her and Doug to an elegant party. Doug, who is not able to eat all day, discovers that there is no food served at the party and is desperate enough to eat raw, out of date eggs, mints, and plant food. He ruins the party by retching and almost throwing up during a show. Meanwhile, Arthur and Spence plan a business idea, but are worried about what will happen once the patent runs out and knock-offs are produced.
22	22	"Time Share"	Rob Schiller	Story by : Nancy Cohen; Teleplay by : Cathy Yuspa & Josh Goldsmith & David Bickel	April 26, 1999	122	11.74
Tim and Dorothy Sacksky give their beach house to Doug and Carrie because they are getting divorced. Dorothy is too upset to hand over the key. Carrie gets Richie to hit on her so she will feel better, and they have sex. Now Dorothy is more upset than ever. Meanwhile, Arthur seeks answers from an ointment company after developing a nasty rash.
23	23	"Where's Poppa"	Rob Schiller	Kevin James & Rock Reuben & Gary Valentine	May 3, 1999	121	12.98
Doug and Carrie get Arthur out of the house so they will have more time together. They decide to try to pawn him off on somebody for a weekend. After they can't get anyone else to do it, Doug calls his cousin Danny (Gary Valentine), whom he hates, and gets Arthur to work at the pizza place Danny is working at and stay with the latter for a weekend, but then Danny wants to hang out with Doug more.
24	24	"Art House"	Rob Schiller	David Litt	May 10, 1999	124	12.43
After Arthur almost gets Doug fired, Doug blows up on him. Feeling unwanted, Arthur moves out only to come back again.
25	25	"Maybe Baby"	Rob Schiller	Michael J. Weithorn	May 17, 1999	123	11.59
After dinner with the Palmers watching Doug play with Kirby, the Palmers announce that Kelly's pregnant with a soon-to-be Major, leaving the Heffernans with dreams of having their own baby.

=== Season 2 (1999–2000) ===
No. overall	No. in season	Title	Directed by	Written by	Original release date	Prod. code	Viewers (millions)
26	1	"Queasy Rider"	Rob Schiller	David Litt	September 20, 1999	201	13.48
Doug's recent purchase of a motorcycle angers Carrie, but soon after, Doug secretly gets tired of it. Arthur gets a job at pretzel shop.
27	2	"Female Problems"	Rob Schiller	Cathy Yuspa & Josh Goldsmith	September 27, 1999	202	13.61
After Carrie's constant togetherness with Doug, Doug finds a friend for Carrie. Soon Doug regrets his actions after Carrie and her new friend Jessica (Myndy Crist) are always together leaving Doug jealous and alone.
28	3	"Assaulted Nuts"	Rob Schiller	David Bickel	October 4, 1999	203	13.69
Doug accidentally shoots himself with a staple gun in a "private" place while fooling around at work. Rather than go to the hospital, he must struggle through a loan interview for Carrie.
29	4	"Parent Trapped"	Rob Schiller	David Bickel	October 11, 1999	204	12.52
Deacon and Kelly ask Doug and Carrie if they want to be their children's Godparents, overcome with the compliment, Doug instantly says yes, but Carrie is not completely on board.
30	5	"Tube Stakes"	Rob Schiller	Ilana Wernick	October 18, 1999	207	13.28
Carrie leaves the garage door open at night. The following morning, Doug enters the garage to find that his television has been stolen. In an effort to make up, she buys Doug a new TV. Doug is grateful, but later accidentally breaks Carrie’s computer and has Arthur take the blame.
31	6	"Doug Out"	Rob Schiller	Cathy Yuspa & Josh Goldsmith	October 25, 1999	206	12.76
Arthur accidentally hears Doug call him a "Demented Old Circus Monkey" so Doug tries to make it up to him by taking him to a New York Mets game. Doug ends up in jail when he tries to catch a foul ball, but Arthur is grateful for it anyway.
32	7	"Get Away"	Rob Schiller	Tony Sheehan	November 1, 1999	208	14.87
When Doug and Carrie go on vacation to celebrate their anniversary, they decide to take Deacon and Kelly, which ends up being a big mistake, as Deacon and Kelly’s active sex life leaves Doug and Carrie feeling insecure.
33	8	"Dire Strayts"	Rob Schiller	Story by : Kevin James; Teleplay by : Rock Reuben & Gary Valentine	November 8, 1999	205	13.16
Doug gets stuck half way in the attic during a visit from Ray and Debra Barone (Ray Romano and Patricia Heaton).
34	9	"I, Candy"	Rob Schiller	Cathy Yuspa & Josh Goldsmith	November 15, 1999	210	12.23
Doug gets a big head after a waitress flirts with him.
35	10	"Roamin' Holiday"	Rob Schiller	David Bickel & Ben Wexler	November 22, 1999	209	11.97
Carrie invites a friend and her husband to stay over for the Thanksgiving weekend, meaning Doug would probably have to entertain her husband. Doug however finds him dull, so after Spence and his mother get into a fight, Doug takes advantage and convinces Spence to ask to stay over at the Heffernans.
36	11	"Sparing Carrie"	Rob Schiller	Story by : Cathy Yuspa & Josh Goldsmith; Teleplay by : David Bickel	November 29, 1999	211	14.60
Doug's bowling team bowls just for fun and is financially supported by the local ale house, but now they threaten to no longer support them if they continue to be on a constant losing streak. Doug soon realizes Carrie is the problem so he removes her from the team making for an awkward household.
37	12	"Net Prophets"	Rob Schiller	David Litt	December 13, 1999	212	14.62
During Christmas time, Doug receives his Christmas bonus and Carrie eventually talks Doug into investing it into net stocks. However, Doug is constantly anxious about the security of such an investment and Carrie ultimately sells the stock. The stock goes up right after she does this and Doug immediately makes her buy back in only for the stock to subsequently plummet. Doug and Carrie ultimately make up on Christmas Eve.
38	13	"Party Favor"	Rob Schiller	Story by : Rock Reuben; Teleplay by : Kevin James & Gary Valentine	January 10, 2000	215	14.05
Doug's cousin Danny (Gary Valentine) has no best man for his marriage, so at Carrie’s insistence, Doug reluctantly fills in and also arranges a bachelor party. Unfortunately Danny does not seem to have many friends who want to come.
39	14	"Block Buster"	Rob Schiller	Tony Sheehan	January 17, 2000	213	15.38
It's Doug's high school football reunion and he boasts about his famous block. But everyone besides him remembers his now handicapped ex-team mate (Pat Finn) making the block. Doug tries to find proof on some old tapes. It turns out Doug did make the block, but was wearing the wrong jersey. Billy Gardell also guest stars as another of Doug’s ex-teammates.
40	15	"Frozen Pop"	Rob Schiller	Ben Wexler	January 24, 2000	214	15.72
Arthur moves upstairs because his cellar gets too cold in winter. Doug does not like it and waits for warmer weather, but Arthur does not seem to want to move back.
41	16	"Fair Game"	Rob Schiller	Mark Sedaka	February 7, 2000	216	11.92
Doug is appalled when he finds out Carrie frequently cheats at board games. She tries to get better but maybe the reason behind her behavior needs to be found first.
42	17	"Meet By-Product"	Rob Schiller	David Litt	February 14, 2000	218	13.60
Back in the 1980s, Richie invites Carrie and a friend of hers over to his and Doug's apartment. While Richie hits it off with the friend, Doug and Carrie have a tough time.
43	18	"The Shmenkmans"	Rob Schiller	Cathy Yuspa & Josh Goldsmith	February 21, 2000	217	13.19
Doug and Carrie are happy with their new friends. But then the Shmenkmans meet Deacon and Kelly and it turns out the two couples have a lot in common.
44	19	"Surprise Artie"	Rob Schiller	David Bickel	February 28, 2000	220	10.96
Doug takes Arthur out for lunch, so Carrie can arrange a surprise 75th birthday party. Doug runs into some problems with Arthur at the buffet, meanwhile the waiting guests back home are starting to fight over one of Arthur’s friends sleeping with another friend’s wife. Arthur runs away from Doug and Carrie has to retrieve him while Doug handles the guests. It turns out Arthur slept with his friend’s wife and blamed it on his other friend, so when Carrie and Arthur finally arrive home, all the guests have left due to being upset with Arthur.
45	20	"Wild Cards"	Rob Schiller	Tony Sheehan	March 6, 2000	219	15.05
After promising to go to the theatre with Carrie, Doug and Deacon take a trip to Atlantic City.
46	21	"Big Dougie"	Rob Schiller	Story by : Ben Wexler; Teleplay by : Cathy Yuspa & Josh Goldsmith	April 17, 2000	221	12.44
Doug decides to become a "big brother" and agrees to participate in a 10 kilometer race supporting heart disease.
47	22	"Soft Touch"	Rob Schiller	David Litt & Tony Sheehan	May 1, 2000	222	7.90
Doug gets tricked by Tim Sacksky (Bryan Cranston) into falling for a pyramid scheme, disguised as a way to make large amounts of money selling water filters.
48	23	"Restaurant Row"	Rob Schiller	Ilana Wernick	May 8, 2000	223	10.55
Carrie gets angry at a waiter and the manager at a recently found favorite restaurant of Doug's. So Carrie bans him from ever going there again. However Doug defies her and goes back there for lunch.
49	24	"Flower Power"	Rob Schiller	Rock Reuben	May 15, 2000	225	12.01
Carrie is jealous when someone from her work gets flowers and takes it out on Doug.
50	25	"Whine Country"	Rob Schiller	Cathy Yuspa & Josh Goldsmith	May 22, 2000	224	11.71
Doug and Carrie both have very specific ideas on how to spend their vacation together. Doug wants to rent an RV, while Carrie prefers a visit to Paris. They flip a coin, and Doug wins. In order to make Doug reconsider his idea, Carrie invites her father on the cross-country trip. She assumes that Doug would not want to spend his vacation in a confined space with the old man. However, to spite her, Doug not only agrees to take Arthur along, but invites Spence as well. Ultimately, Arthur and Spence go on the road trip while Doug and Carrie stay home.

=== Season 3 (2000–01) ===
This is the only season in which Patton Oswalt as Spence Olchin appears as a recurring character, rather than a main one.

No. overall	No. in season	Title	Directed by	Written by	Original release date	Prod. code	Viewers (millions)
51	1	"Do Rico"	Rob Schiller	Cathy Yuspa & Josh Goldsmith	October 2, 2000	303	14.00
Carrie is turned on by Doug's imitation of his new Hispanic co-worker, Rico (Angelo Pagan; Leah Remini's then-husband). He later becomes jealous of Rico when he realizes that Carrie seems more responsive to him when he imitates Rico. Meanwhile, Arthur drags an Indian delivery boy into chronicling his own life story.
52	2	"Roast Chicken"	Rob Schiller	Tony Sheehan	October 9, 2000	302	14.39
Carrie has Doug sign a congratulatory card for his boss' twenty years at the company. Her boss is grateful for the congratulatory remark when he opens the card and decides that he wants Doug to participate in the banquet roast, where the latter blames Carrie for this fiasco. Doug rises to the occasion, however, and even manages to get some good laughs out of the audience, until he starts to tell some jokes that hit a little too close to home.
53	3	"Fatty McButterpants"	Rob Schiller	Cathy Yuspa & Josh Goldsmith	October 16, 2000	301	14.84
Doug is offended that Carrie wants him to lose weight, so he vows to lose 30 pounds. After his failed attempt to settle the score by remarking that she wears too much make-up in which her co-workers would actually give her compliments, Doug makes up Carrie's other "quirks".
54	4	"Class Struggle"	Jeff Melman	David Litt & Ilana Wernick	October 23, 2000	307	13.71
Carrie decides to return to college with very little time to get things done.
55	5	"Strike One"	Rob Schiller	David Litt	October 30, 2000	304	13.22
Doug's car breaks down, so he goes out and buys a new Jeep Grand Cherokee just as his union goes on strike against IPS.
56	6	"Strike Too"	Leonard R. Garner Jr.	David Bickel	November 6, 2000	305	14.40
Second week of the IPS strike; Doug gets a job as a substitute teacher at the school where his sister Stephanie (Ricki Lake) works as a PE teacher. Doug has trouble connecting with his students and tries to make things more interesting, only to end up lashing out at his class and getting fired.
57	7	"Strike Out"	Leonard R. Garner, Jr.	Nick Bakay	November 13, 2000	306	13.91
The IPS strike is in its third week, and both Doug and Deacon are spending the majority of their days doing very little outside of sleeping all day. Carrie and Kelly decide to make a play date with Doug, Deacon and Arthur, but the plan backfires when they turn into a trio of merry pranksters.
58	8	"Dark Meet"	Rob Schiller	Rock Reuben	November 20, 2000	308	14.49
After a great Thanksgiving, Doug and Carrie try to recall their first Thanksgiving together and who said, "I Love You" first. They consult Arthur, who quickly recalls some other Thanksgivings and finally recalls 1993 when he was having a fight with his new wife, Lily (Florence Henderson), as Doug was coming over to meet the family.
59	9	"Twisted Sitters"	Rob Schiller	Ilana Wernick	November 27, 2000	310	13.14
Doug and Carrie watch Deacon and Kelly's kids while they are out of town. When one of the kids sees them making love in the Palmers' bedroom, they must keep him from telling his parents.
60	10	"Work Related"	Rob Schiller	David Bickel	December 4, 2000	309	14.28
Arthur begins to work at Carrie's law firm. Meanwhile, Doug and Deacon compete for the best practical joke.
61	11	"Better Camera"	Rob Schiller	Cathy Yuspa & Josh Goldsmith	December 11, 2000	311	16.81
Doug and Deacon go shopping together for their wives' Christmas presents. They each buy cameras, but Deacon chooses one that is less expensive than the one Doug got because Kelly, Deacon's wife, often loses her cameras. When Carrie correctly guesses what Doug got for her, she convinces him to give her the camera early so that she can take photos at her office's Christmas party. Unfortunately, one of the new partners at Carrie's law firm gives everyone nicer cameras for Christmas. Carrie gives Doug’s camera to the Palmers, which upsets both Doug and Kelly (the latter finding out Deacon deliberately cheaped out on her). Meanwhile, Arthur sees an opportunity to have his script made into a movie when Lou Ferrigno moves next door. Lou ends up helping the Heffernans and Palmers resolve their differences.
62	12	"Wedding Presence"	Rob Schiller	Cathy Yuspa & Josh Goldsmith	January 8, 2001	312	15.21
Instead of driving out of state for their friends' wedding, Carrie and Doug decide to stay home and later tell the couple that they were there, but did not see them. After thinking things through that their friends will notice their absence nonetheless, they decide to go to the wedding anyway but end up missing them by seconds. Meanwhile, Arthur gets Spence to participate in his scheme to get discounted shoes by having Spence pose as Arthur’s son. Spence ends up bonding with Arthur over this, but they soon fall out.
63	13	"Hi-Def Jam"	Rob Schiller	David Bickel & Ilana Wernick	January 29, 2001	315	15.74
In order to watch the upcoming Super Bowl on a high-definition television, Doug hatches a plan to have his sister Stephanie (Ricki Lake) date Carrie's wealthy boss Doug Pruzan (Alex Skuby). The plan is successful, but Stephanie finds Prozac possessive, and Carrie becomes upset with Doug upon learning of his scheme. Pruzan ends up breaking his TV remote out of heartbreak after Stephanie dumps him and the TV gets stuck on AMC, causing the guys to miss the game.
64	14	"Paint Misbehavin'"	Rob Schiller	Tony Sheehan	February 5, 2001	314	14.92
After Carrie tells Doug that it's okay for him to find other women attractive, he asks her to tell him which men she finds attractive. Among others, she says she finds Deacon good looking, which causes Doug to become jealous. Doug complains about it to Deacon, who brags about it to his wife, Kelly. Deacon's paintball birthday party turns into a jealous war. Note: The final appearance of Larry Romano as Richie Iannucci.
65	15	"Deacon Blues"	Rob Schiller	David Litt & Tony Sheehan	February 12, 2001	316	12.93
Doug is surprised to find his married best friend, Deacon, out with another woman. Since Deacon only had dinner with the woman and nothing more, Doug successfully convinces him to come clean to Kelly. However, Kelly promptly separates from Deacon since she believes he technically still cheated on her. Meanwhile, Carrie questions her relationship with Doug because of their different views on cheating.
66	16	"Horizontal Hold"	James Widdoes	David Bickel & Ilana Wernick	February 19, 2001	317	13.04
After Deacon and Kelly's separation, Carrie begins to wonder about her own marriage. She convinces Doug to put their sex lives on hold for two weeks because Carrie feels that they should resolve their arguments verbally, not always physically. Meanwhile, Deacon adjusts moving in with Spence after being separated from Kelly and Arthur reluctantly dates a woman (Pamela Gordon) who's been hitting on him ever since her cousin died, but has a change of heart when she claims that she once slept with Frank Sinatra.
67	17	"Inner Tube"	Rob Schiller	Kevin James & Rock Reuben	February 26, 2001	320	13.89
When Doug lies to Carrie to play mud football, he gets sick and starts feeling guilty. He consequently has dreams about it based on television shows such as The Honeymooners, Wheel of Fortune, The Young and the Restless and television film Brian's Song.
68	18	"Papa Pill"	Rob Schiller	Nick Bakay	March 19, 2001	313	14.29
When Doug accuses Carrie of being too hard on Arthur, he volunteers to be the latter's caretaker, only to find the task much more demanding than he had anticipated.
69	19	"Package Deal"	Rob Schiller	Mark Sedaka	April 9, 2001	318	13.97
Doug considers getting a new job at FedEx after Mitch (Craig Anton), a FedEx supervisor (who previously worked at IPS), made it sound like a better career choice. Meanwhile, Carrie gets addicted to tanning cream after helping her neighbor, Lou Ferrigno, spread it all over his body.
70	20	"Separation Anxiety"	Andrew Susskind	Cathy Yuspa & Josh Goldsmith	April 16, 2001	319	12.48
During the Palmer's separation, Doug and Carrie go to the movies with Kelly while Deacon takes care of the kids at Spence's house. At the movies, Carrie runs into Bill (Joseph C. Phillips), a co-worker who seems interested in Kelly. The two end up going on a date just when Deacon is ready to patch things up with her. Doug and Carrie end up fighting after Doug and Deacon crash the date, but Deacon and Kelly begin to resolve their issues.
71	21	"Departure Time"	Rob Schiller	Nick Bakay	April 30, 2001	321	11.45
Doug, Carrie and Arthur head out to the airport to visit with Doug's parents (Jenny O'Hara and Dakin Matthews) while they have a short layover at Kennedy Airport on their way to Montreal. Doug becomes uncomfortable during their reunion when his parents ask him to sign their living will, making him responsible for pulling the plug. When Doug's sister Stephanie gets wind of this, she is offended that she wasn't selected to be responsible for the unenviable task.
72	22	"Swim Neighbors"	Henry Chan	David Bickel & Ilana Wernick	May 7, 2001	322	12.19
A hurricane destroys the fence separating the backyards of the Heffernans and the Sackskys (Bryan Cranston and Dee Dee Rescher). When Carrie rejects their idea of a combined backyard by reinstalling the fence, the Sackskys retaliate by installing an above ground pool. Note: The final appearance of Bryan Cranston and Dee Dee Rescher as the Sackskys.
73	23	"S'no Job"	Rob Schiller	Rock Reuben & Tony Sheehan	May 14, 2001	323	11.01
Doug's Uncle Stu (Gavin MacLeod) asks him to get his son, Danny, a job at IPS. Doug doesn't want him working there but he also doesn't want to look bad to the family so he instructs his boss Mr. O'Boyle (Sam McMurray) to interview him but not hire him. Meanwhile, Arthur fills out audience comment cards on a new movie.
74	24	"Pregnant Pause"	Rob Schiller	Michael J. Weithorn & David Litt	May 21, 2001	324	13.92
75	25	"Pregnant Pause"	Rob Schiller	Michael J. Weithorn & David Litt	May 21, 2001	325	13.92
Carrie discovers that she's pregnant and she panics that the timing is wrong. Meanwhile, Deacon and Kelly begin to reconcile, leaving Spence out in the cold, and Arthur insists that Doug can build him his own bathroom in the basement. Doug gets a night job working as limo driver and tells Arthur that because the contractor they were using is now too expensive with Carrie being pregnant, he would finish the downstairs bathroom himself. However, the responsibility of working two jobs and Arthur constantly bothering him to finish his bathroom prove too much for Doug, in which he finally collapses at one of Carrie's appointments. In the end, she loses the baby via miscarriage. Deacon moves back in with Kelly, leaving Spence alone.: Note: This episode marks the first appearance of Nicole Sullivan, whose character is a baby store employee named Marilyn who tries to help Carrie. Sullivan was added to the cast as a new character the next season, and was elevated to main star in the three seasons after that.

=== Season 4 (2001–02) ===
No. overall	No. in season	Title	Directed by	Written by	Original release date	Prod. code	Viewers (millions)
76	1	"Walk, Man"	Rob Schiller	Michael J. Weithorn	September 24, 2001	402	15.87
In an effort to spend more time with Carrie, Doug hires Holly (Nicole Sullivan) a dog walker to walk Arthur. The plan backfires when Carrie starts spending more time on her own endeavors rather than with Doug.
77	2	"Sight Gag"	Rob Schiller	Cathy Yuspa & Josh Goldsmith	October 1, 2001	401	14.28
Doug surprises Carrie with laser eye surgery for her birthday. In an effort to save money, he chooses a cheaper doctor that results in a very worried couple when her sight does not return properly.
78	3	"Mean Streak"	James Widdoes	Michael J. Weithorn	October 8, 2001	404	14.90
Doug is on course to break the record for the number of days without an "incident" - no complaints and no broken packages. The older members of the IPS depot aren't too happy that Doug is going to break the record held by their friend.
79	4	"Friender Bender"	Rob Schiller	David Bickel	October 15, 2001	403	15.05
Following Kelly and Carrie to dinner, Doug, with Deacon as his passenger, accidentally hits Kelly's car while sneaking a peek at a strip club. This causes a rift between the couples when the Palmers insist the Heffernans pay for the damages. Meanwhile, Spence babysits Kirby, who doesn’t believe Spence is allergic to peanuts but just scared, forcing Spence to take extreme measures to prove him wrong.
80	5	"No Retreat"	Rob Schiller	Kevin James & Rock Reuben	October 22, 2001	405	14.71
Carrie brings Doug to her company retreat for the weekend. Carrie tries to get Doug to look like a successful person, but he puts on a bad show. Doug tells Carrie that he'll try to work harder to her get a promotion, only to go too far when he tells one of the senior partners that he climbed Mt. Everest.
81	6	"Ticker Treat"	James Widdoes	David Bickel	October 29, 2001	407	14.24
Doug wants to celebrate Halloween because Deacon is bringing Kirby by for trick-or-treating, but Arthur forbids it because he hates Halloween. Feeling Arthur doesn’t respect him, Doug retaliates by putting up extensive decorations, only for Arthur to have a minor heart attack upon seeing a paper ghost. In the hospital, Arthur tells Doug that he hates Halloween because he had to trick-or-treat for hours as a child to feed his treats to his poor family and all his neighbors took pity on him. Doug feels bad and tries to make amends by getting Arthur’s favorite childhood treat, but ends up giving Arthur a second heart attack. Meanwhile, Kirby dresses up as Blossom the Powerpuff Girl, causing Deacon to fear his son may be gay.
82	7	"Lyin' Hearted"	Rob Schiller	Ilana Wernick	November 5, 2001	408	15.42
While Arthur is in the hospital to have an angioplasty, Carrie starts doubting that she still loves her father. After looking in his room and discovering her Florida State University acceptance letter, it is revealed that Arthur hid this for his own selfish reasons, further questioning her feelings for him. Meanwhile, Doug runs into a client (Chris Elliott) from his delivery route, who is having a colonoscopy and listed Doug as his emergency contact, considering Doug his only friend.
83	8	"Life Sentence"	Rob Schiller	Chris Parrish	November 12, 2001	410	14.84
Doug and Carrie decide to install a hidden camera in the basement to monitor Arthur when he comes home from the hospital. One night, whilst in Doug's garage, Danny, Deacon and Spence happen upon the camera, which has been wired into the Heffernan's television network on Channel 300 so that they can watch Arthur from the TV. Soon, Doug's three friends become addicted to what they call "Arthur TV". Elsewhere, Doug and Carrie fall out over who will take care of Arthur if they die. Arthur eventually chastises them for their thoughtless bickering, and the three of them make up as Doug’s friends watch in the garage.
84	9	"Veiled Threat"	Rob Schiller	Ilana Wernick	November 19, 2001	411	14.39
With the episode being set before Doug and Carrie's marriage, Carrie is very nervous in marrying Doug to the point where she can't stop vomiting. When the two meet with their priest, he remembers that Doug and Carrie met at camp as kids (with the former being at football camp), which alleviates the latter's jitters. When Doug shares the story to his family, his cousin Danny reveals that it was actually him that Carrie fell on, not Doug, in which the latter was actually at "fat" camp that year. Doug must now break the news to a now-relieved Carrie. Meanwhile, Arthur couldn't pay for Doug and Carrie's wedding, leading him to convince Doug's parents to pay for it, only to spend way too much money on unnecessary things.
85	10	"Oxy Moron"	Rob Schiller	Tony Sheehan	November 26, 2001	406	16.24
Doug takes the oxygen mask all for himself when his and Carrie's plane makes a rough landing, only for it to simply hit the ground. Carrie becomes upset knowing that Doug wouldn't help her if she was in real danger, so he attempts to lessen his guilt by arguing that she would do the exact same thing and by thinking of times when he helped her. His efforts end in vain when she reveals that his mistake significantly changed her outlook of him. Meanwhile, Spence moves in with Danny after his rent gets too high.
86	11	"Depo Man"	Rob Schiller	Chris Downey & Ilana Wernick	December 10, 2001	409	12.76
Carrie's boss requests her to get Doug to be an expert witness in her company's court case, but she feels unsure on how Doug will do. She enlists Deacon instead, only to have second thoughts on not using Doug. In the end, Doug is the witness and winds up only having to answer one question. Meanwhile, Spence and Danny have a house-warming party after moving in together, where Danny meets Holly. Danny wants to ask Holly out, only for Spence to forbid it.
87	12	"Ovary Action"	Rob Schiller	Richard J. Feinstein	December 17, 2001	413	16.50
Doug and Carrie want to conceive, but receive another negative pregnancy result. When it is revealed that Carrie only has one working ovary, they find that they must get started in conceiving right away, only to be hindered when Doug's parents visit.
88	13	"Food Fight"	Rob Schiller	Chris Downey	January 7, 2002	414	16.39
Carrie grows jealous when Spence's girlfriend recruits Doug to test her culinary work. Meanwhile, Arthur's lack of classical movie knowledge shocks Carrie.
89	14	"Double Downer"	Rob Schiller	Jeff Stein	January 14, 2002	412	14.84
Deacon convinces Doug to come along to Atlantic City for a weekend. Carrie wants to go salsa dancing with Doug but concedes to the latter's wishes and goes to Atlantic City with him. However, Deacon sends a message that he won't be coming, revealing his falling out with Kelly. Doug and Deacon's boss on the other hand, overhears their conversation and ends up meeting Doug and Carrie at Atlantic City, much to the couple's dismay. Deacon eventually shows up as well and it’s revealed that Carrie inadvertently caused the split. Carrie tries to apologize to Deacon, but gets distracted when she wins the jackpot on the slots.
90	15	"Dougie Nights"	Rob Schiller	Cathy Yuspa & Josh Goldsmith	February 4, 2002	417	14.19
Carrie persuades Doug to take Deacon to a nightclub to cheer him up, but it's Doug who really gets into the scene.
91	16	"No Orleans"	Rob Schiller	Ilana Wernick	February 25, 2002	416	14.07
Doug and Carrie sneak off to New Orleans without Doug's cousins after reneging on a deal to travel with them. The trip soon turns into a struggle to stop Doug's cousins from finding out their ruse. Elsewhere, Arthur decides he wants to create a comic strip for Playboy Magazine and hires Spence to draw it for him.
92	17	"Missing Links"	Rob Schiller	Michael J. Weithorn	March 4, 2002	415	15.20
Carrie's work has an annual golf trip, but Doug and Carrie used to always take Deacon and Kelly. Now that Deacon and Kelly have separated, Doug and Carrie have to try to find another couple to invite to the golf trip. However, Doug and Deacon later meet Leslie (Angelle Brooks), freeing up Deacon to bring her and join Doug and Carrie to the trip. Carrie meets Leslie and has a hard time bonding with her despite Doug being able to. Meanwhile, Holly agrees to watch Deacon's kids as he goes to the annual golf trip, but she has to bring a reluctant Arthur along. Though Arthur’s behavior is disruptive at first, he eventually begins to bond with Kirby.
93	18	"Hero Worship"	James Widdoes	David Bickel & Chris Downey	March 18, 2002	418	14.23
Doug's uncle Stu (Gavin MacLeod) is willing to pay for Doug's dream, his own sandwich shop. Carrie doesn't think it is a good idea but is afraid to tell Doug.
94	19	"Screwed Driver"	James Widdoes	Rock Reuben	March 25, 2002	419	14.14
Carrie goes on a business trip to Chicago when Doug's parents decide to come for a week trip. During his time at work, Doug's boss informs him and his fellow IPS drivers that they're going to have to take a test that could affect their status as drivers. Doug is worried about the test and doesn't know how to attend to his parents, but his mother makes it easier for him by taking care of him and his household. Doug begins to feel young like a teenager again, leading him to take his studies for granted and fail his test.
95	20	"Lush Life"	James Widdoes	Tony Sheehan	April 8, 2002	420	15.65
Carrie starts joining a co-worker for after-work cocktails and Doug realizes that she's less abrasive whenever she comes home. When Carrie reveals having a fallout with her, Doug and Arthur conspire in making Carrie less sober to keep her in good spirits, making their neighbor Lou Ferrigno uncomfortable with the whole ordeal.
96	21	"Bun Dummy"	Rob Schiller	Chris Downey & Tony Sheehan	April 29, 2002	422	11.46
Doug and Spence have a high school reunion where the former is looking forward to it until Carrie starts sporting a new hairstyle, which is a tight bun that he thinks looks like a librarian's hair. Doug is now afraid that she'll also sport that hairstyle to the reunion. Later at the reunion Carrie puts her hair up into a bun but when she sees that a librarian who died had the same hairstyle when she was alive Carrie decides to put her hair down and begins to feel embarrassed. Meanwhile, Spence doesn't want to attend the reunion because he had a relationship with one of his teachers that ended really badly. Thankfully, Carrie puts her hair down for the reunion, while the teacher Spence was afraid of doesn’t even remember him and thus has no hard feelings.
97	22	"Patrons Ain't"	James Widdoes	Ilana Wernick	May 6, 2002	421	11.34
Doug and Carrie donate enough money to Kirby's school library to become one of its patrons. However, a series of misunderstandings with the librarian, Nana Louise (Marla Gibbs), lead Doug and Carrie to go to great lengths to correct her mistakes.
98	23	"Eddie Money"	Rob Schiller	Story by : Kevin James; Teleplay by : Rock Reuben & Mike Soccio	May 13, 2002	424	12.33
Doug takes a $100 from his and Carrie's savings stash to bet on boxing. When he and Deacon win $5,000, they hide the winnings from their wives by blowing the entire amount in one day, which includes having singer Eddie Money give them a private concert.
99	24	"Two Thirty"	Rob Schiller	David Bickel	May 20, 2002	425	12.21
Doug suspects that his dentist Dr. Farber (Tim Matheson), Deacon’s dentist, is purposely hurting him during his visits because the dentist once had a thing for Carrie. He tries to solve the problem by fixing Farber up with Holly, but this quickly falls apart. Meanwhile, Arthur volunteers to teach Deacon's son to play the piano, despite the fact that he doesn't know anything about playing it. Carrie eventually tells Farber about Doug’s fears and the dentist apologizes to him.
100	25	"Shrink Wrap"	Rob Schiller	Michael J. Weithorn	May 20, 2002	423	13.47
When Carrie and Arthur's constant fighting begins to irritate Doug, Arthur is taken to a therapist (William Hurt) to discuss why he has to yell and act up all the time. It is revealed that Arthur's problems stem from his childhood, by being horribly treated by his own father (Ben Stiller). With Arthur cured, Doug and Carrie realize that Arthur wasn’t the only one with issues, Carrie realizes that she is only happy when other people are miserable, and Doug doesn't like confrontation. In the end Doug, Carrie and Arthur make a deal. Carrie and Arthur will continue fighting while Doug continues seeing the therapist. Note: Ben Stiller plays Jerry Spooner, the father of his real life father, Jerry Stiller.

=== Season 5 (2002–03) ===
No. overall	No. in season	Title	Directed by	Written by	Original release date	Prod. code	Viewers (millions)
101	1	"Arthur, Spooner"	Rob Schiller	Tony Sheehan	September 23, 2002	502	14.95
Doug gets Arthur to accompany him in his bed because he cannot sleep without Carrie.
102	2	"Window Pain"	Rob Schiller	Ilana Wernick	September 30, 2002	501	13.74
After their neighbors hear Doug and Carrie in a big fight, Carrie tries to convince the neighbors, Mike (Michael Lowry) and Debi (Marcia Cross) that they are better than that. Meanwhile, Arthur gets Spence to let him ride the subway for free.
103	3	"Holy Mackerel"	Rob Schiller	Ilana Wernick	October 7, 2002	504	11.68
After Carrie receives a bonus after a prayer in church, Carrie starts praying for many things (mostly petty). Doug is disgusted but soon "sees the light" and joins in on Carrie's "prayer spree". Meanwhile, Arthur hosts an open house on the Heffernan House in an attempt to trade-in to a better home with a better room for him to live in, dragging Holly (Nicole Sullivan) in the process.
104	4	"Kirbed Enthusiasm"	Rob Schiller	Kevin James & Rock Reuben	October 14, 2002	503	14.01
Deacon complains to Doug about how much Kirby hates football, so he gets Doug to play football again to encourage him.
105	5	"Mammary Lane"	Rob Schiller	David Bickel & Michael J. Weithorn	October 21, 2002	506	13.96
Carrie recently accepts a job given out by her boss, babysitting for his child. Even though his child is already about 4 years old, he constantly keeps grabbing her breasts. Meanwhile, Doug, after seeing Denise (Rachel Dratch), an unattractive woman working at the bowling alley, throws her a "mercy flirt", but the woman mistakes it for sexual harassment, and Spence buys TiVo and cannot wait to see what it will record for him.
106	6	"Business Affairs"	Rob Schiller	Cathy Yuspa & Josh Goldsmith	October 28, 2002	507	14.64
Doug gets jealous because someone calls Carrie's new work friend, Kurt, her "work husband", even though Kurt is gay.
107	7	"Flame Resistant"	Rob Schiller	Rock Reuben	November 4, 2002	509	14.01
After Doug bumps into his ex-girlfriend Margy (Lola Glaudini), she and Doug's mother (Jenny O'Hara) spend a lot of time together, making Carrie jealous. Meanwhile, Doug and Margy get into a heated argument where Doug claims that he wrote her a song when they were dating, only to find out for himself that he didn't finish it.
108	8	"Flash Photography"	Henry Chan	David Bickel	November 11, 2002	508	13.96
At a wedding, Doug is bored and Deacon recalls a story of his own wedding where someone took a photo of their behind. Doug gets inspired by this, takes a disposable camera into the restroom, and tries to copy the story (only this time, it's of his "be-front"), before letting Danny take the blame for it.
109	9	"Connect Four"	Rob Schiller	Ilana Wernick	November 18, 2002	510	13.63
After Carrie receives some tickets to four Knicks games from her boss, she tries to find a couple to go with her and Doug. Carrie finds a couple but Doug does not like her husband and Doug finds a couple but Carrie does not like the wife, leaving Carrie to come up with the idea of a "Franken-couple".
110	10	"Loaner Car"	Rob Schiller	Cathy Yuspa & Josh Goldsmith	November 25, 2002	512	14.92
Doug enjoys the single life after he lends Carrie out to Deacon during Thanksgiving to help him out.
111	11	"Mentalo Case"	John Fortenberry	David Bickel	December 16, 2002	511	12.94
At Christmas time, Doug remembers a toy he had as a child so he tries to buy one on eBay but Carrie prevents him because he wanted to pay $180. Doug later goes to a toy convention with Spence to try to track one down. After a sequence of events, Doug thinks Deacon bought him the toy. Carrie thinks Holly bought her a leather jacket, because Arthur gets Holly to disclose Carrie's gift to him.
112	12	"Jung Frankenstein"	Rob Schiller	Michael J. Weithorn	January 6, 2003	505	14.68
After a successful visit to a therapist (Dave Foley) about Doug's over-eating, Carrie gets the therapist to work on other problems Doug has without Doug knowing.
113	13	"Attention Deficit"	Rob Schiller	Chris Downey	January 20, 2003	515	14.20
Carrie gets mad at Doug for not asking about her job evaluation and at that the fact that he never thinks of her because he is too busy planning his Super Bowl party.
114	14	"Prints Charming"	Rob Schiller	Cathy Yuspa & Josh Goldsmith	February 3, 2003	518	14.86
Doug and Carrie pick up their photos at a drug store on their way home, only to find out that they received photos of another couple known as the Hoffermans upon viewing them. Realising that the Hoffermans are very active people who lead more exciting lives, Carrie forces Doug to engage in more strenuous activities with her like scuba diving. Meanwhile, a delighted Arthur buys himself a cellphone, only to feel disappointed when nobody gets in touch with him through it.
115	15	"Animal Attraction"	Rob Schiller	Rock Reuben	February 10, 2003	517	13.48
On Valentine's Day, Carrie has to cancel dinner with Doug because he and Deacon have to deliver two penguins to Albany. Holly is recently dumped so Carrie takes her out to a nightclub in hopes of cheering her up, and Arthur and Spence spend their Valentine's Day at Arthur's senior center.
116	16	"Golden Moldy"	James Widdoes	Tony Sheehan	February 17, 2003	513	13.63
While on vacation with Mike and Debi, Doug gets a call from Arthur, telling him he discovered that the house is mold-damaged and the repair bill is $7,000. So Doug tries to keep a close eye on their money spending for the rest of the trip.
117	17	"S'Poor House"	James Widdoes	Michael J. Weithorn	February 24, 2003	514	14.80
Doug and Carrie find out they have $12,000 worth in mold damage in their house (more than the original estimate) so Doug asks his dad (Dakin Matthews) for the money. Before handing over the money, he looks through receipts, and soon discovers that Carrie has spent large amounts on clothes. On top of the financial problems, Arthur makes an attempt to devise a plan to get the money needed by borrowing from Veronica (Anne Meara), Spence's mom.
118	18	"Steve Moscow"	Rob Schiller	Chris Downey	March 10, 2003	516	14.04
Doug and Carrie hire Steve (Charles Rocket) and his group of Russian mold employees to repair their damage, but it takes much longer and costs more than they expected.
119	19	"Cowardly Lyin'"	Rob Schiller	Ilana Wernick	March 31, 2003	519	13.31
Doug wants to avoid going to an opera planned by Carrie, so he lies and says he was working late. After Carrie finds out about his lie, Doug admits that he lies because he is scared of her. So they try to support each other, but this leads to more problems.
120	20	"Driving Reign"	James Widdoes	Rock Reuben & Mike Soccio	April 14, 2003	521	12.21
After Danny gets a job working at IPS with Doug, he is able to do Doug's route faster than Doug can. Meanwhile, Holly makes the mistake of giving Arthur a mini-trophy that says "World's Best Grandfather", because Arthur would rather be more like a father to her than a grandfather.
121	21	"Clothes Encounter"	James Widdoes	Chris Downey	April 21, 2003	522	12.12
Carrie discovers a "loop hole" in the system, where she has up to 30 days to return items she purchases. Soon, it gets out of hand and she fills up her entire office with a temporary wardrobe. Meanwhile, Spence's girlfriend, Denise, meets his dog Alan, but she is really terrified of dogs.
122	22	"Queens'bro Bridge"	James Widdoes	David Bickel	April 28, 2003	520	11.72
Doug finds out that Arthur owns inherited property where there is a house built, but there's just one problem, it's co-owned by his hated half-brother, Skitch (Shelley Berman). Doug attempts to reunite the brothers in an attempt to have Arthur move out.
123	23	"Dog Shelter"	Rob Schiller	David Bickel & Ilana Wernick	May 5, 2003	525	11.93
After a visit at his parents' house, Doug finds out that his dog has died and been replaced 3 times. Plus, Doug is informed by his parents that he was born in Montreal, Quebec, which means he's Canadian. Meanwhile, Spence wants Arthur's help in making the encounter between his mother, Veronica, and his girlfriend, Denise, a smooth one.
124	24	"Taste Buds"	Rob Schiller	Story by : Trevor Dellecave; Teleplay by : Tony Sheehan	May 12, 2003	524	11.58
Doug tricks Arthur into asking Carrie for things that Doug actually likes because Carrie is more apt to listening to Arthur. Meanwhile, Spence camps out for days outside a movie theater so he can be first in line for a new movie.
125	25	"Bed Spread"	Rob Schiller	Owen Ellickson	May 19, 2003	523	11.47
When their bed breaks, Doug and Carrie order a new one but it won't arrive for several days. In the meantime they get two single beds and realize they sleep better that way. They eventually discover that being apart works, they see separate movies, eat at separate restaurants and even joke about taking separate vacations. But in the end they find they want to be together. Meanwhile, Arthur discovers that the basement has a window that faces the sidewalk and becomes embroiled in Lou Ferrigno's gossip about the neighborhood.

=== Season 6 (2003–04) ===
No. overall	No. in season	Title	Directed by	Written by	Original release date	Prod. code	Viewers (millions)
126	1	"Doug Less"	Rob Schiller	Ilana Wernick	October 1, 2003	604	13.65
127	2	"Doug Less"	Rob Schiller	Ilana Wernick	October 1, 2003	603	13.65
Doug takes Carrie on a trip to a lakeside hotel in celebration of his recent weight loss, only later to find it wasn't Carrie that he took previously. Doug and Carrie end up lost in the woodland and go their separate ways, only to reunite at the end.
128	3	"King Pong"	Rob Schiller	Tony Sheehan	October 8, 2003	601	11.35
Doug becomes crazed with winning when Arthur buys a ping pong table. Meanwhile, Denise (Rachel Dratch), Spence's girlfriend, gets promoted to waitress at the bowling alley and Spence is not happy.
129	4	"Dreading Vows"	Rob Schiller	David Bickel	October 15, 2003	602	9.49
Doug and Carrie go through hell to prepare their vow-renewal ceremony. On top of that, Arthur is praying that his wedding present, aged Port wine, will go unused when he discovers the value of the fine wine on eBay.
130	5	"Nocturnal Omission"	Rob Schiller	Michael J. Weithorn	October 22, 2003	605	10.35
Doug finds out Deacon is moving on with a new girl at the same time Kelly is ready to reconcile.
131	6	"Affidavit Justice"	Rob Schiller	Kevin James & Rock Reuben	October 29, 2003	607	12.48
Doug pretends to work at Carrie's law firm to play on the company's softball team.
132	7	"Secret Garden"	Ken Whittingham	Chris Downey	November 12, 2003	606	12.69
Danny becomes the landscaper for Carrie's new gynaecologist Dr. Crawford (Judge Reinhold), which turns out to be trouble when his bill is larger than his estimate.
133	8	"Eggsit Strategy"	Rob Schiller	Cathy Yuspa & Josh Goldsmith	November 19, 2003	609	11.92
Carrie fears she may lose her job after hearing that the company is intent on firing the "dead wood"; her boss, Mr. Pruzan. Eventually, she also loses her job.
134	9	"Thanks, Man"	Rob Schiller	Michael J. Weithorn	November 26, 2003	612	15.00
A stranger wearing an eye patch (Nick Offerman) waiting outside makes for a tense Thanksgiving dinner with friends at the Heffernan House.
135	10	"American Idle"	Rob Schiller	Cathy Yuspa & Josh Goldsmith	December 3, 2003	610	11.36
After applying for many jobs and constantly being rejected, Carrie decides to stop searching and intends to complete other things in her life. Shortly after however, she becomes lazy, depressed and spends all her time at home.
136	11	"Santa Claustrophobia"	Rob Schiller	Owen Ellickson	December 17, 2003	611	11.24
Carrie gets a temp job at IPS and Doug feels she's around him all the time. Meanwhile, Arthur wants a family Christmas photo and will have anybody in it with him.
137	12	"Dougie Houser"	Rob Schiller	David Bickel	January 7, 2004	608	13.33
Doug and Carrie look back on how they got their house.
138	13	"Frigid Heirs"	Rob Schiller	Jenna Bruce	January 14, 2004	613	12.46
Doug and Carrie scam Arthur out of his Bingo winnings.
139	14	"Switch Sitters"	Rob Schiller	Tony Sheehan	February 11, 2004	614	11.89
Doug and Carrie get Deacon and Kelly to babysit Arthur in exchange for their babysitting Kirby and Major. However, Deacon and Kelly disregard Carrie’s warnings and let Arthur eat a spicy dish. Arthur gets sick and Doug and Carrie spend a sleepless night taking care of him, and get revenge by giving Kirby and Major coffee. This leads to Arthur and the Palmer children being basically tortured by their respective sitters in order to cause more grief to the other couple.
140	15	"Cheap Saks"	Rob Schiller	Cathy Yuspa & Josh Goldsmith	February 11, 2004	615	12.29
Carrie befriends Doug's ex-girlfriend Trish (Janeane Garofalo), with whom he treated poorly. Carrie immediately gets tired of Trish, so she uses her to get discounts at Saks the same way Doug used Trish in order to sleep with her. Meanwhile, Spence agrees to go out with a guy (Scott Atkinson) to boost his self-esteem following his break-up with his girlfriend, only to feel "more undesirable" when the guy doesn't make a move on him.
141	16	"Damned Yanky"	Rob Schiller	Chris Downey	February 18, 2004	616	11.92
Carrie learns that Doug has fantasies about other women and makes a specific list of women that she approves of for him to dream about. Note: This episode guest stars both Steffiana de la Cruz and Angelo Pagán, Kevin James' future wife and Leah Remini's husband respectively, both of whom played their respective spouses' fantasy love interests.
142	17	"Multiple Plots"	Rob Schiller	Rock Reuben	February 25, 2004	617	12.68
In a trio plot: Arthur tries to sell his extra funeral plot. Carrie takes up dog walking to earn some extra money. Doug makes an interesting new friend on his new route.
143	18	"Trash Talker"	Rob Schiller	David Bickel	March 3, 2004	618	11.10
Sean McGee (Jon Favreau) Doug's old grade school bully becomes friends with Deacon. Doug cannot seem to let go of the past and continues his hatred for him, because he accused Doug of licking a trash can. Carrie backs her husband up until she realizes the man is a district attorney who might have a position for Carrie at his office.
144	19	"Precedent Nixin'"	Rob Schiller	Ilana Wernick	March 17, 2004	619	9.87
Doug and Carrie convince Deacon and Kelly to go with them to Doug's parents' home in Florida for vacation.
145	20	"Foe: Pa"	Rob Schiller	Michael J. Weithorn	March 24, 2004	620	12.98
When Arthur nearly costs Carrie a new job, he vows to set things right.
146	21	"Tank Heaven"	Rob Schiller	Rock Reuben	April 7, 2004	621	9.76
Doug deliberately scares away all of Carrie's friends from work with several crude techniques in an attempt to sabotage his wife's efforts to socialize with them. Meanwhile, Spence learns that women have a soft spot for guys who take care of the elderly and starts spending time with Arthur.
147	22	"Altar Ego"	Rob Schiller	Tony Sheehan	May 5, 2004	622	9.19
Doug, Spence, Deacon and Danny drive to Memphis so Spence can stop his ex-girlfriend Denise's wedding. Meanwhile, Arthur fills in for a senior-center employee.
148	23	"Icky Shuffle"	Rob Schiller	Chris Downey	May 12, 2004	623	9.60
Doug helps Arthur compete in the seniors shuffleboard competition against a rival (William Daniels). Meanwhile, Holly cooks for Carrie while she is sick and Carrie milks it for all it is worth.
149	24	"Awful Bigamy"	Rob Schiller	Ilana Wernick	May 19, 2004	624	8.69
Holly moves in with Doug and Carrie when she is evicted. Doug takes advantage of her by making her his "downstairs wife" for food and Carrie being his "upstairs wife" for sex.

=== Season 7 (2004–05) ===
This is the last season where Nicole Sullivan as Holly Shumpert appears as main star.

No. overall	No. in season	Title	Directed by	Written by	Original release date	Prod. code	Viewers (millions)
150	1	"Lost Vegas"	Rob Schiller	Tom Hertz	October 27, 2004	702	10.68
Doug takes Carrie to a spa in hopes that he will earn enough "wife credit" for Carrie to allow him to go to Las Vegas with his friends.
151	2	"Dugan Groupie"	Rob Schiller	Tony Sheehan	November 3, 2004	701	11.53
Doug feels lonely when Carrie enjoys her job after a recent promotion.
152	3	"Furious Gorge"	Rob Schiller	Ilana Wernick	November 10, 2004	703	12.74
Doug learns his over-eating is caused by Carrie's anger.
153	4	"Entertainment Weakly"	Rob Schiller	Mike Soccio	November 24, 2004	704	9.47
Doug gets outrageously jealous when a new driver is the center of attention doing comedy bits of celebrity impressions, so he sends him to the wrong route. However, the driver gets brutally injured by a gang and Doug feels bad.
154	5	"Name Dropper"	Rob Schiller	Rock Reuben	December 1, 2004	705	12.66
Doug forgets the name of one of Carrie's work friends so he fakes a heart attack to get out of the situation.
155	6	"Offtrack... Bedding"	Rob Schiller	Nick Bakay	December 8, 2004	706	10.04
Doug becomes worried when his neglected mother starts spending time with Arthur while his dad attends a model-train convention.
156	7	"Silent Mite"	Andy Cadiff	Ilana Wernick	December 15, 2004	707	9.84
Doug gets jealous when Carrie is hit on by a little person in the store. Later, Doug figures out the runt had stolen his wallet, but Carrie does not believe him because she thinks he just has it in for him because he was hitting on her.
157	8	"Awed Couple"	Rob Schiller	David Bickel	January 5, 2005	708	10.23
Doug and Carrie go to great lengths to find a new couple to hang out with after Deacon and Kelly start spending time with another family.
158	9	"Cologne Ranger"	Andrew D. Weyman	Rock Reuben	January 12, 2005	709	11.04
Doug buys a new cologne (from a mall that he, Deacon, and Danny go to) that sees him getting a lot of attention from other women, but Carrie does not like it and asks him to bring it back to the store. However Doug continues to secretly wear it. When Carrie discovers Doug has been using the new cologne, she confronts him and Doug tells Carrie about all the ways she controls him. Meanwhile, Arthur attempts to school Spence and Holly in the art of movie hopping, which basically means sneaking into a cinema.
159	10	"Domestic Disturbance"	Ken Whittingham	Tony Sheehan	January 19, 2005	710	12.12
Carrie hires a Hispanic housekeeper, but the language barrier frustrates Doug, so he decides to hire Spence's mother (Anne Meara) as his own housekeeper.
160	11	"Pour Judgment"	Rob Schiller	Owen Ellickson	January 26, 2005	711	11.24
Doug reignites an old dream of becoming a bartender. He decides to go to bartender school, against Carrie's wishes. Carrie then changes her mind after seeing all the money that Doug received from tips. Meanwhile Arthur runs for president at the Senior Center.
161	12	"Gym Neighbors"	Rob Schiller	David Bickel	February 9, 2005	712	8.87
When Doug and Carrie start training with their neighbor Lou Ferrigno so Carrie can lose a few pounds, Doug works out a deal with Lou to just laze around during exercise time. Note: This episode features footage from a 1976 episode of The $10,000 Pyramid where Jerry Stiller played as a celebrity; the clip was slightly altered to make it appear that Arthur was a contestant on the show.
162	13	"Gorilla Warfare"	Rob Schiller	Mike Soccio & Owen Ellickson	February 16, 2005	713	9.92
Carrie recalls what Doug said to her when they were dating that made her want to marry him, but then she learns a horrifying truth that the phrase that he said was from an Erik Estrada movie. Meanwhile, Danny falls for Holly and thinks she feels the same way about him, even though Spence tries to convince Danny.
163	14	"Hi, School"	Rob Schiller	Ilana Wernick	February 23, 2005	714	9.48
Doug goes back to his old high school to deliver a package to his high school coach (Burt Reynolds) and gets embroiled in the sports team again.
164	15	"Deconstructing Carrie"	Rob Schiller	Michelle Nader	March 2, 2005	715	9.47
Carrie's 35th birthday is coming up, and she begins to worry about how she looks as she gets older. So, to cheer her up, Doug gets some construction workers to yell filthy things at her. Meanwhile, Holly suggests to make a collage of photos; it turns out that there are not any photos of Arthur and Carrie bonding together.
165	16	"Black List"	Rob Schiller	Liz Astrof Aronauer	March 16, 2005	716	11.10
Doug realizes Deacon's new best friend is just a black version of himself. Meanwhile, Carrie has a problem at her nail salon: her mani/pedicurist "cancels" her. Guest star: Ted Lange (The Love Boat)
166	17	"Wish Boned"	Rob Schiller	David Bickel & Michael J. Weithorn	March 30, 2005	717	8.96
Carrie gets Doug to take Arthur on a recently won game tickets and trip to St. Louis after they make a deal that he never has to do anything with him any more. Everything goes wrong though when they are diverted to Pittsburgh then Dayton, Ohio.
167	18	"Van, Go"	Mark Cendrowski	Tom Hertz	April 6, 2005	718	7.93
Carrie gets Holly to go with her to Lowe's secretly because of her large van. Joanne (Rebecca Corry), a masculine waitress at a restaurant frightens Doug. Arthur and his friend George pull a casino party to earn some extra cash, which ends up backfiring.
168	19	"Ice Cubed"	Rob Schiller	Story by : Cathy Ladman; Teleplay by : Michelle Nader & Liz Astrof Aronauer	April 13, 2005	719	7.67
During a snow storm: Carrie gets an iPod for free after a cashier is busy talking on the phone and accidentally does not scan it, but Carrie's guilty conscience gets the best of her; Arthur staying at Holly's because of the weather ruins a visit with her boyfriend; Doug is forced to stay with a Japanese couple which turns out to be a copy of him and Carrie.
169	20	"Catching Hell"	Rob Schiller	Chris Downey	April 20, 2005	720	7.85
Carrie tries to impress a client (Concetta Tomei) at a New York Mets game but Doug keeps screwing it up. So she pretends that Spence is her husband instead. Meanwhile, Holly's gay uncle (Hal Linden) becomes a hit at Arthur's party, making Arthur jealous.
170	21	"Slippery Slope"	Rob Schiller	Chris Downey & Rock Reuben	May 9, 2005	721	10.04
Doug and Carrie go skiing however the trip comes with a catch, a time-share meeting. Danny and Spence also go on the trip pretending to be life partners to get a free weekend.
171	22	"Buy Curious"	Rob Schiller	Ilana Wernick	May 18, 2005	722	7.95
The death of Doug and Carrie's neighbor leads them to contemplate entering the world of real estate flipping, but they suspect Lou Ferrigno is out to quash their dreams.

=== Season 8 (2005–06) ===
No. overall	No. in season	Title	Directed by	Written by	Original release date	Prod. code	Viewers (millions)
172	1	"Pole Lox"	Rob Schiller	Michael J. Weithorn	September 19, 2005	801	10.74
Accompanied by Doug's heavy encouragement, Carrie enrolls in a pole dancing class, but doesn't turn out to be a quick study. Meanwhile, Arthur makes an effort to spend more time with Carrie by taking her to kid-related events to sway her off pole dancing, believing it could "ruin" her life.
173	2	"Vocal Discord"	Rob Schiller	Chris Downey	September 26, 2005	802	10.65
After a computer microphone records a fight between the two of them, Doug and Carrie begin to think that marriage counseling is a good idea. Meanwhile, Arthur directs a play at the senior center.
174	3	"Consummate Professional"	Rob Schiller	Ilana Wernick	October 3, 2005	803	10.31
Carrie learns that when they were dating, Doug lied to her about his (un)employment status to get her in bed. Doug tells his story to Carrie how he got his job in IPS and met Deacon.
175	4	"Like Hell"	Mark Cendrowski	Owen Ellickson & Mike Soccio	October 10, 2005	804	10.50
Doug finds out that Jared (Bryan Callen) a new guy at work does not like him, so he tries to become friends with the guy but comes on too strong. Carrie also goes overboard when she tries to change her image at work and help a co-worker (Laura Silverman) "improve" herself.
176	5	"Sandwiched Out"	Rob Schiller	Nick Bakay & David Bickel	October 17, 2005	805	10.47
Deacon gets a sandwich named after him at Cooper's, infuriating Doug. Holly announces she is moving away with her boyfriend, but Carrie is not fond of the idea and Arthur cannot seem to say good-bye.
177	6	"Shear Torture"	Rob Schiller	Liz Astrof Aronauer	October 24, 2005	806	11.23
Carrie becomes jealous of Doug's relationship with his attractive hairdresser. Meanwhile, Spence is excited to go to a Fantasy Fest with Lou Ferrigno, but when Adam West also agrees to go, Spence must decide between the two.
178	7	"Inn Escapable"	Rob Schiller	Michelle Nader	November 7, 2005	807	11.23
Doug and Carrie's weekend at a quaint bed and breakfast turns out to be less than desirable. Worse, they do not feel comfortable about leaving because they are the only people at the inn for the entire weekend.
179	8	"Move Doubt"	Rob Schiller	Liz Astrof Aronauer & Owen Ellickson	November 14, 2005	810	10.93
Doug and Carrie try to get Deacon and Kelly to buy the house next to them, but a couple with eight kids moves in instead. Meanwhile, Danny and Spence compete over a girl from Albania named Zana (Sanya Mateyas).
180	9	"G'Night Stalker"	Rob Schiller	Chris Downey	November 21, 2005	809	10.98
Doug and Carrie decide to go out to a karaoke club, where Doug's singing catches the attention of a stranger, who then becomes obsessed with Doug.
181	10	"Raygin' Bulls"	Howard Murray	Michelle Nader & Rock Reuben	November 28, 2005	813	12.92
Carrie goes away with Arthur to visit her mother's grave, and finds out she's not who she thinks she is. Doug and Ray Barone (Ray Romano) spend the weekend trying to pick up girls, attempting to outdo each other in a nightclub. Note: This episode is Ray Romano's final appearance as Ray Barone.
182	11	"Baker's Doesn't"	Michael J. Weithorn	Liz Astrof Aronauer & Ilana Wernick	December 19, 2005	815	11.32
Carrie is asked to bake a cake for the Church bake sale, but she cannot bake. Meanwhile, Arthur and Spence go through hell to come up with a Christmas song to write.
183	12	"Fresh Brood"	Rob Schiller	Michelle Nader & Rock Reuben	January 9, 2006	808	12.11
To persuade Carrie to have a baby, Doug borrows an infant whom Danny is supposed to be taking care of to show Carrie what a good father he would be. Meanwhile, Arthur feels like he deserves to be a coffee shop's "customer of the month".
184	13	"Gambling N'Diction"	Rob Schiller	Ilana Wernick	January 23, 2006	811	11.38
After Carrie is told she might not get a promotion because of her accent she seeks Spence for help. Meanwhile, Doug's mother comes to visit and after seeing her play poker, Doug takes her to Vegas to hustle some people out of their money.
185	14	"Apartment Complex"	Michael J. Weithorn	David Bickel	February 6, 2006	812	11.60
Doug, Deacon, Spence and Danny all secretly rent an apartment, but soon Deacon, Spence and Danny move out and Doug lives by himself. Carrie tries to sell a condo to Kirstie Alley but it turns out to be more work than she expected.
186	15	"Buggie Nights"	Rob Schiller	David Bickel & Chris Downey	February 27, 2006	817	10.81
Doug and Carrie hire an exterminator (Chris Elliott) to rid their house of bed bugs. Meanwhile, Spence and Danny try to decide where to go on vacation.
187	16	"Knee Jerk"	Ken Whittingham	Story by : Amy Gershwin; Teleplay by : David Bickel & Chris Downey	March 6, 2006	814	10.48
Carrie "accidentally" pushes Doug backwards down the stairs, injuring his knee. Carrie feels bad for him so she waits on him hand and foot. Doug enjoys the attention, so he continues to pretend to be in pain.
188	17	"Present Tense"	Henry Chan	Michelle Nader & Rock Reuben	March 13, 2006	816	11.30
For their anniversary, Doug and Carrie receive a less-than flattering portrait of themselves from Deacon and Kelly. As they try to find ways to get rid of the portrait without hurting Deacon and Kelly's feelings, Spence and Danny try hard to become Doug and Carrie's "go-to couple".
189	18	"Sold-Y Locks"	Rob Schiller	Owen Ellickson & Dennis Regan	March 20, 2006	818	10.75
Doug convinces Carrie to sell her hair for money, but later regrets his decision, when he sees her hair is cut "like a boy". Meanwhile, Arthur thinks he might not be Carrie's father and decides to investigate this, likely with the instructions of Spence.
190	19	"Emotional Rollercoaster"	Rob Schiller	Amy Gershwin	April 10, 2006	819	8.35
It's Doug's 40th birthday and Carrie begins to try to make Doug realize that he should start wanting to do more with his life. So Doug decides he wants to ride a roller coaster that he was too afraid to ride when he was younger. During this time, Arthur devises a plan to dodge long park lines. Note: As an in-joke, Patton Oswalt remains completely motionless in the first scene he appears in.
191	20	"Four Play"	Rob Schiller	Liz Astrof Aronauer & Michelle Nader	May 1, 2006	820	7.44
Doug and Deacon discover they have more in common with each other's wives than their own, so they start hanging out with each other's wives as well. When Kelly tires of Doug, he ruins Deacon and Carrie's good time. Meanwhile, Arthur dispenses romance advise and the recipient finds success simply doing the opposite.
192	21	"Hartford Wailer"	Rob Schiller	Story by : David Bickel & Chris Downey; Teleplay by : Giuseppe Graziano	May 8, 2006	821	7.99
Carrie prepares for a ladies night with her co-workers, until Doug surprises her at the hotel. Meanwhile, Spence and Danny pretend to be security to get into a Huey Lewis concert.
193	22	"Fight Schlub"	Rob Schiller	Owen Ellickson & Mike Soccio	May 15, 2006	822	8.21
Doug befriends a driver (Adam Ferrara) from a rival delivery company, until he learns it's fake. Carrie is left to mentor a 16-year-old girl (Blythe Auffarth), however finds that bad behavior helps her make friends better than good behavior.
194	23	"Acting Out"	Rob Schiller	Story by : Liz Astrof Aronauer & Michelle Nader; Teleplay by : Rock Reuben	May 22, 2006	823	8.39
Carrie is finally fed up with Arthur, so she decides to put him in a retirement home. Doug, of course, is excited but after a touching story told by Arthur, Doug tries to decide whether or not Arthur should go. Meanwhile, it's Danny and Spence's second anniversary of living together and Spence reminds Danny on the bet they had on Spence getting the bigger room, but Danny is willing to fight him over it. Note: This episode features a brief clip of Jerry Stiller in The Taking of Pelham One Two Three.

=== Season 9 (2006–07) ===
No. overall	No. in season	Title	Directed by	Written by	Original release date	Prod. code	Viewers (millions)
195	1	"Mama Cast"	Rob Schiller	Mike Soccio & Ilana Wernick	December 6, 2006	905	9.42
Doug invests their tax return in an ice cream truck. Initially cold to the idea of Doug driving a truck on the side (his main career being an IPS truck driver), Carrie warms up when she sees how excited he is about the prospect. Meanwhile, Carrie plays the mother in a model home family, causing her to yearn for a real family of her own.
196	2	"Affair Trade"	Rob Schiller	Rock Reuben & Dennis Regan	December 6, 2006	907	10.17
Doug receives suggestive phone messages from a woman (Leigh-Allyn Baker) who thinks she spent a weekend with him at the beach, so he must hide the messages from Carrie while he tries to let the woman know she has the wrong man.
197	3	"Moxie Moron"	Rob Schiller	Liz Astrof Aronauer & Owen Ellickson	December 13, 2006	903	9.02
Doug becomes the interim boss at IPS, but pretty much does the worst job imaginable. One of Carrie's co-workers "steals her moxie" so she vows to become more noticeable at her job. The plan backfires when she realizes there are downsides to getting noticed.
198	4	"Major Disturbance"	Rob Schiller	Rock Reuben & Ilana Wernick	December 13, 2006	901	9.04
Doug accidentally scares Deacon and Kelly's son Major, so the two decide they no longer want him spending time with Doug. Meanwhile, Arthur and his senior center buddies are chewed up and spat out by the service industry when they start up their own business.
199	5	"Ruff Goin'"	Rob Schiller	David Bickel & Chris Downey	December 20, 2006	904	8.29
Doug adopts a dog, but when the dog begins to take after Doug and Arthur, Carrie quickly grows tired of having three lazy boys hanging around the house. Trying to get rid of the dog proves useless until a very interesting buyer steps up.
200	6	"Brace Yourself"	Rob Schiller	David Bickel & Chris Downey	January 3, 2007	902	8.47
Major's drawing of Arthur makes him self-conscious to the point of asking Doug and Carrie for braces for his teeth, but Doug and Carrie are reluctant to say yes. Meanwhile, Spence loses his job in the subway, so Kelly hires him to help out around their house.
201	7	"Home Cheapo"	Rob Schiller	Liz Astrof Aronauer & Ilana Wernick	April 9, 2007	906	13.41
Carrie is upset when she learns that Deacon and Kelly bought a vacation house. She believes they were able to afford it because they are cheap and freeload off of her and Doug. Elsewhere, Arthur gives job-hunting tips to Spence.
202	8	"Offensive Fowl"	Rob Schiller	David Bickel & Chris Downey	April 16, 2007	908	12.22
Doug becomes a vegetarian after hitting, and nearly killing, a chicken with his IPS truck. Carrie quickly tires of having to eat meat in private because of Doug forcing his new beliefs onto her.
203	9	"Mild Bunch"	Rob Schiller	Story by : Liz Astrof Aronauer & Owen Ellickson; Teleplay by : Dennis Regan & Mike Soccio	April 23, 2007	909	12.63
At his high school reunion, Doug and Jeff "The Beast" Sussman (Adam Sandler), an old classmate who is now a vice principal, plot revenge on their principal, Nagel (Sandy Wernick). Meanwhile, Carrie and Arthur try hard to find a movie to watch which they will both enjoy, and possibly argue about it.
204	10	"Manhattan Project"	Rob Schiller	Rock Reuben	April 30, 2007	910	13.03
Carrie wants to move to an apartment in Manhattan, but Doug wants to stay in Queens. Their impasse makes them realize they have very different ideas about their future, with Carrie ultimately moving to the apartment without Doug. Meanwhile at the senior center, Arthur encounters an old singer (Lainie Kazan) whom he trains and eventually becomes engaged to.
205	11	"Single Spaced"	Rob Schiller	Story by : Ilana Wernick; Teleplay by : David Bickel & Chris Downey	May 7, 2007	911	13.42
Doug and Carrie consider adopting a baby after they get marriage counseling from their priest and run into friends who recently had a child. But, while Doug holds up his end of the bargain and gets a new job, Carrie secretly keeps the apartment.
206	12	"China Syndrome"	Rob Schiller	Michael J. Weithorn	May 14, 2007	912	13.61
207	13	"China Syndrome"	Rob Schiller	Michael J. Weithorn	May 14, 2007	913	13.61
In the series finale, Doug, having discovered that Carrie did not get rid of her apartment in Manhattan – as she was supposed to three weeks ago – tells her that he wants a divorce. Carrie wants to stay together and plans to go to China to pick up their adopted child. Also, Arthur's bride leaves him just before the wedding, believing that he was gay the whole time. At the last minute, Arthur asks Spence's mother to marry him. Doug and Carrie race to China, each attempting to claim their baby before the other. On the way, they reconcile. Carrie finds out after adopting that she is pregnant, and she is overwhelmed. A flash forward to a year later shows a messy, hectic household with both Doug and Carrie struggling to care for two small children, when Arthur suddenly returns because his marriage does not work out.
