= Kurt Farquhar =

American TV and film score composer

- Born: United States
- Genre: Film score
- Occupations: Television, film composer
- Website: kurtfarquhar.com

Kurt Farquhar is a Los Angeles–based television and film composer. Farquhar is an eleven-time BMI award winner, including four for The Neighborhood, four for The King of Queens one for The Game and two for Being Mary Jane. He is known for composing the scores for The King of Queens, Girlfriends, Sister, Sister, Moesha, Being Mary Jane, The Game, Black Lightning, The Neighborhood, and Real Husbands of Hollywood. Farquhar's career is notable for having scored more prime-time television series than any other African-American composer to date. Currently, Farquhar composes the score to the CBS soap opera Beyond the Gates. In 2026, he was nominated for a NAACP Image award for Outstanding Soundtrack for "The Proud Family: Louder & Prouder".

A native of Chicago, he is the youngest of five children. He is the younger brother of television producer and writer Ralph Farquhar, and the two have worked together on several shows.

Farquhar musical education took him from the streets of Chicago to the famed Berklee College of Music in Boston, The National Conservatory of Music in Versailles, France, and Eastern Illinois University, where he studied with noted percussion teacher Johnny Lane. By the age of 12, Farquhar had already written his first symphonic work. During his early 20s, Farquhar performed with various jazz artists most notably Grammy Award-winning trumpet player Freddie Hubbard.

In his late twenties, Farquhar was the lead singer of the band Big Slamm. They released their first single, "Livin' Large," on Modern Records. This song went on to become the end title for the pilot episode of Livin' Large, produced by Stephen J. Cannell. Farquhar went on to create theme songs and scores for a multitude of television shows and feature films.

Farquhar is also the founder and CEO of True Music, a prominent music licensing catalog operating out of Pasadena, California, which has licensed music throughout broadcast and cable television as well as feature films.

== Works ==
=== Television ===
Title	Year	Notes
Beyond the Gates	2025	CBS
First Kill	2022	Netflix
The Proud Family: Louder and Prouder	2022, 2025	Disney+
Abraham Lincoln TV Mini Series	2022	Amazon Prime Video
Sacrifice	2021	BET+
Black Lightning	2018–2021	The CW
Games People Play	2019–present	BET
The Neighborhood	2018–present	CBS
Saints & Sinners	2016–2022	Bounce TV
Kirk Franklin's The Night Before Christmas	2022	Lifetime
Kirk Franklin's A Gospel Christmas	2021	Tubi
Wendy Williams: The Movie	2021	Lifetime TV Biopic
Merry Liddle Christmas Wedding	2020	Lifetime TV Movie
Kidnapped: The Kamiyah Mobley Story	2020	Lifetime TV Movie
American Soul	2019-2020	BET
Being Mary Jane	2013–2019	BET
Being Mary Jane	2019	BET TV Movie
Ambitions	2019	Oprah Winfrey Network
In Contempt	2018	BET
The Quad	2016–2018	BET
Russell Simmons: All Def Comedy	2017	HBO
Media	2017	TV One TV Movie
Stitchers	2015-2017	Freeform
The Quad (TV Movie)	2016	BET TV Movie
Furst Born	2016	CBS Scored pilot
Winning Ugly	2016	Fox Scored pilot
Love Under New Management: The Miki Howard Story	2016	BET TV Movie
Second Sight	2016	TV One TV Movie
Zoe Ever After	2016	BET
Here We Go Again	2016	TV One
The Next 15	2016	TV One
Real Husbands of Hollywood	2013–2016	BET
Keyshia Cole: All In	2015	BET
Light Girls	2015	Oprah Winfrey Network TV Movie
The Game	2006–2023	The CW/BET/Paramount+
Single Ladies	2011–2015	BET Her/Centric/VH1 Seasons 3 and 4
The Fright Night Files	2014	TV One
Triggers: Weapons That Changed the World	2011–2013	American Heroes Channel
Keyshia & Daniel: Family First	2012	BET
Free Agents	2011	NBC
A.N.T. Farm	2011	Disney Channel
Dark Girls	2011	Oprah Winfrey Network TV Movie
Reed Between the Lines	2011	BET
K-Ci & JoJo... Come Clean	2010	TV One Docu-series
Russell Simmons Presents: Brave New Voices	2009	HBO
Lincoln Heights	2007–2009	Freeform
Bill Bellamy's Who's Got Jokes?	2006–2009	TV One
Gym Teacher: The Movie	2008	Nickelodeon TV Movie
Just Jordan	2007–2008	Nickelodeon
Keyshia Cole: The Way It Is	2006–2008	BET
Girlfriends	2000–2008	UPN/The CW
All of Us	2003–2007	UPN/The CW
The King of Queens	1998–2007	CBS
The Adventures of Baxter and McGuire	2006	Comedy Central
Blendin'	2006	Scored pilot
Love, Inc.	2005–2006	UPN
One on One	2001–2006	UPN Seasons 2 and 3
Keke & Jamal	2005	Disney Channel TV Movie
Second Time Around	2004–2005	UPN
Dance 360	2004–2005	Syndication
The Proud Family	2001–2005	ABC/Disney Channel
Soul Food: The Series	2000–2004	Showtime
Soluna	2004	Scored pilot
Cuts	2004	Scored pilot
The Parkers	1999–2004	UPN
Saving Jason	2003	Scored pilot
Play'd: A Hip Hop Story	2002	VH1 TV Movie
Commitments	2001	BET TV Movie
Cousin Skeeter	1998–2001	Nickelodeon
The Famous Jett Jackson	1998–2001	Disney Channel
Moesha	1996–2001	UPN
Dancing in September	2000	HBO TV Movie
The Corner	2000	HBO Miniseries
Smart Guy	1997–1999	The WB
In the House	1995–1999	NBC/UPN
Sister, Sister	1994–1999	ABC/The WB
Cousin Skeeter	1998	Nickelodeon
The Kirk Franklin Show	1998	Scored pilot
Claude's Crib	1997	USA Network
C Bear and Jamal	1996–1997	Fox
Ned and Stacey	1995–1997	Fox
Matt Waters	1996	CBS
Under One Roof	1995	CBS
My Brother and Me	1994–1995	Nickelodeon
South Central	1994	Fox
The Sinbad Show	1994	Fox
Def Comedy Jam: Primetime	1994	HBO
Thea	1993–1994	ABC
Roc	1991–1994	Fox
Rachel Gunn, R.N.	1992	Fox
The Royal Family	1991–1992	CBS
Drexell's Class	1991–1992	Fox
New Attitude	1990	NBC
Jackée	1989	NBC Television pilot

=== Film ===
Title	Year	Director
The Best You Can	2025	Michael J. Weithorn
Ruth & Boaz	2025	Alanna Brown
Absolute Dominion	2025	Lexi Alexander
Can You Feel the Beat: the Lisa Lisa Story	2025	Tailiah Breon
Tempted by Love: A Terry McMillan Presentation	2024	Tailiah Breon
Single Black Female 2: Simone's Revenge	2024	Shari L. Carpenter
Bull Run	2024	Alfredo Barrios Jr.
Unthinkably Good Things	2022	Terri J. Vaughn
2 Minutes of Fame	2020	Leslie Small
The Counter: 1960'	2017	Tracy "Twinkie" Bird
Created Equal	2017	Bill Duke
The Perfect Match	2016	Bille Woodruff
What Love Will Make You Do	2015	Lisa Haynes
Dark Girls	2012	Bill Duke and D. Channsin Berry
96 Minutes	2011	Aimee Lagos
Lifted	2011	Lexi Alexander
Pastor Brown	2009	Rockmond Dunbar
Not Easily Broken	2009	Bill Duke
The Adventures of Baxter Baxter & McGuire: The Boss	2008	Mike Blum
Cover	2007	Bill Duke
Miles from Home	2006	Ty Hodges
Gas	2004	Henry Chan
Room 302	2001	Short film

=== Recordings ===
1. Real Life (composer) – The Pointer Sisters
2. Stupid Love (arranger) – Brenda Russell
3. Crazy For Your Love (composer) – Sam Riney
4. Now That I'm With You (composer) – Papa John Creach
5. Everytime We Kiss (composer) – Sam Riney
