= South Central (TV series) =

1994 American television series

- Genre: Comedy; Drama
- Created by: Ralph Farquhar; Michael J. Weithorn
- Written by: Mara Brock Akil; Ralph Farquhar; Gary Hardwick; Kathleen McGhee-Anderson; Gina Prince-Bythewood; Michael Anthony Snowden; Michael J. Weithorn
- Directed by: W.E. Baker; Stan Lathan; Terri McCoy
- Starring: Tina Lifford; Larenz Tate; Tasha Scott; Keith Mbulo
- Composer: Kurt Farquhar
- Country of origin: United States
- Original language: English
- No. of seasons: 1
- No. of episodes: 10

Production
- Executive producers: Ralph Farquhar; Michael J. Weithorn
- Producer: W.E. Baker
- Camera setup: Multi-camera; Single-camera (cold open only)
- Running time: 30 minutes
- Production companies: Slick/Mac Productions; 20th Television

Original release
- Network: Fox
- Release: April 5 – June 7, 1994

South Central is an American comedy drama sitcom that aired on the Fox network from April 5, 1994, to June 7, 1994. It was cancelled following its first season, after ten episodes aired.

== Synopsis ==
The series was set in 1990s South Central Los Angeles, and dealt with the lives of an African American family, the Moseleys, and issues such as gang violence, drugs, dating, sex, school, and unemployment. Joan Moseley (Tina Lifford) is a divorced mother, raising three children with no assistance from her ex-husband. Her oldest son Marcus having been murdered years earlier by a gang member, Joan's financial situation becomes complicated after she is laid off. Her remaining children include Andre (Larenz Tate), Tasha (Tasha Scott), and foster son Deion Carter (Keith Mbulo). Rounding out the cast of characters are Joan's best friend "Sweets" (Paula Kelly) and Andre's mentor Dr. Ray McHenry (Ken Page).

South Central featured a recurring cast which included Jennifer Lopez, Shar Jackson, and Maia Campbell. The series, which was produced on a smaller budget than most sitcoms, was popular among critics for what was perceived as a realistic and sometimes dark portrayal of urban life.

== Cancellation ==
The show aired on Tuesday evenings following Roc. Due to the decline in ratings of the entire night of programming, Fox cancelled all the shows on that night (as well as Thursday comedies The Sinbad Show and In Living Color). The cancellation of the series, all of which had predominantly black casts, prompted Jesse Jackson to call for a boycott of the network for perceived institutional racism. Fox maintained that the series was low rated and the decision to cancel was not racially motivated.

Series co-creators Ralph Farquhar and Michael J. Weithorn would go on to create other series independently: Farquhar would co-create the UPN sitcom Moesha, along with Sara V. Finney and Vida Spears. The series (a more traditional sitcom) was set in Leimert Park, a middle-class neighborhood near View Park-Windsor Hills Los Angeles. Lamont Bentley and Shar Jackson were members of the cast. Weithorn went on to create the Fox series Ned and Stacey (starring Thomas Haden Church and Debra Messing) and later the CBS series The King of Queens (starring Kevin James, Leah Remini and Jerry Stiller).

== Cast ==
=== Main ===
- Tina Lifford as Joan Mosely
- Larenz Tate as Andre Mosely
- Tasha Scott as Tasha Mosely
- Keith Mbulo as Deion Carter

=== Recurring ===
- Lamont Bentley as Rashad
- Paula Kelly as Sweets
- Ken Page as Dr. Ray McHenry
- Michael Beach as Isaiah Washington
- Earl Billings as Mayo Bonner
- Maia Campbell as Nicole
- Shar Jackson as Shanelle
- Jennifer Lopez as Lucille
- Clifton Powell as Bobby Deavers
- Malinda Williams as Candi

== Episodes ==
No.	Title	Directed by	Written by	Original release date	Prod. code
1	"Pilot"	Stan Lathan	Ralph Farquhar & Michael J. Weithorn	April 5, 1994	1S79
Joan objects when Andre purchases a beeper. Although he insists that he needs it to keep his social life in order, Joan believes the beeper will make him a target for drug dealers or gang members. She orders him to get rid of it. Joan finds herself out of work after a series of layoffs by the school district.
2	"Money"	Stan Lathan	Michael J. Weithorn & Ralph Farquhar	April 12, 1994	1S01
Embarrassed by the prospect of going on welfare, Andre takes a loan from a gangster who was friends with his older brother, Marcus. Joan is furious, as she fears that Andre is becoming involved with the same activities that led to his brother's death. She returns the money to the young man, and is outraged when he says that he thought of Marcus as family. She blames Marcus's gang lifestyle for his death, and declares that his fellow gang members cannot possibly understand the Moselys' pain. Joan is also disturbed by the fact that the man's mother is proud of him for hustling and dealing drugs. The woman doesn't care where her son gets the money, as long as he provides for her.
3	"RTD"	Stan Lathan	Ralph Farquhar & Michael J. Weithorn	April 19, 1994	1S02
After Andre brings home a terrible report card, Joan orders him to attend a session with his mentor, Ray. Andre goes against his mother's wishes by taking the bus (RTD) to Ray's office. Andre and Rashad have a confrontation with a gang member, who tries to steal their radio. Rashad jumps out the window, but the guy pulls a gun on Andre. The gunman's friend recognizes Andre as Marcus's brother and defuses the situation. Andre becomes smitten with Ray's secretary, a smart and wealthy girl named Nicole. He decides to go to church with Ray that Sunday in the hopes of seeing her again. While riding the bus, Andre has a run-in with the same guy, who beats him and steals his basketball shoes. When Andre shows up for church with a black eye and no shoes, Nicole's parents conclude that he is a thug and forbid her from seeing him. Nicole and Andre spend hours talking on the phone.
4	"CO-op"	Terri McCoy	Michael J. Weithorn & Ralph Farquhar	May 3, 1994	1S03
While working as a cashier at the local co-op market, Joan appears in a television news segment about black-owned businesses. Bobby, her boss, publicly declares himself a hero for providing employment to a down-on-her-luck woman who had been forced to go on food stamps. Joan is completely humiliated, and lights into Bobby for sharing her business with the whole city. Bobby insists that he simply wanted to generate good publicity for the co-op, but later apologizes for his insensitivity. Isaiah comes to the store and tries to take back the items Ujamaa is stocked with but Bobby talks him out of it. Tasha is distressed that she cannot attend track meets or hang out with her friends because she must watch Deion every day. He refuses to obey her, and begins to scream and physically attack her at one point. When Tasha takes Deion to a therapy session, his psychiatrist senses her frustration and gives her a chance to get some things off her chest. Tasha is happy when Deion reaches out to her, if only momentarily.
5	"Men"	Stan Lathan	Michael Anthony Snowden	May 10, 1994	1S04
Joan and Isaiah meet up again at the co-op, and have a much more pleasant encounter than their first meeting. Sweets invites him to a party, and Tasha later catches them kissing. Andre is enraged. He had encouraged Ray to ask her out, and believes his mother should give him a chance. Joan declares that she and Ray are only friends, and orders Andre to mind his own business. However, she tells Isaiah that she cannot get into a serious relationship because her life is already too complicated. Andre sneaks out of the house to see Nicole.
6	"Dad"	Stan Lathan	Gary Hardwick	May 17, 1994	1S05
Tasha is overjoyed when her father, James, unexpectedly shows up for her 14th birthday party; but her mother and brother are less than thrilled. Despite Nicole's pleas, Andre refuses to behave civilly toward his father. Andre confronts a group of gang members who try to crash the party. He is furious when James comes off as the hero by defusing the situation peacefully. Andre tells him off and starts a shoving match. After James criticizes Joan's parenting skills (and suggests that she might be responsible for Marcus's death), she screams at him and throws him out of the party. Tasha follows her father and spends the rest of the day with him. Andre discovers some surprising information; although he had assumed that James abandoned the family, Joan actually ended the marriage. When Tasha returns, Joan tells her that she doesn't have to turn her back on her father, but could show her mother some appreciation.
7	"Gun: Part 1"	Stan Lathan	Michael Anthony Snowden	May 24, 1994	1S06
Nicole and Andre continue to see each other behind her parents' backs. But Nicole tells Andre that she loves him and she won't go "any further," (meaning sex) unless she knows Andre loves her. The relationship is at a stand still when Andre doesn't really know how to answer Nicole's question. Tired of being pushed around and threatened, Andre steals his mother's gun in the hopes of gaining respect around the neighborhood and also for protection whenever he takes the RTD to see Nicole. Andre & Rashad almost get into a fight with a guy after Rashad was flirting with the guy's girl. Andre pulls out the gun and the guy steps off the bus. Bobby talks to Andre & Rashad hearing that they were involved in an incident on the bus and asks if the rumor is true. They say no. But Bobby tells them a lot of young guys like Andre, has started carrying guns for protection and lets Andre and Rashad know if they ever need to talk about anything, he's always here for them. Joan puts Andre on punishment after lying about where he's been and what he has been up to. Andre and Rashad plays with the gun in Joan's bedroom. Rashad tells Andre with a gun, they got, "juice." Also Rashad would like to retaliate against the guys who tried to rob him of his radio. Andre, however, has bigger plans with carrying the weapon by stating, "I want to run up on them fools that killed my brother, Marcus." But what Andre and Rashad don't know is that Deion is in the background watching Andre holding the gun. To be continued...
8	"Gun: Part 2"	Stan Lathan	Michael Anthony Snowden	May 24, 1994	1S07
Andre is off punishment and decides to hook up with Nicole for the High Life party, which is being held at the Omajjah, where Bobby & Joan works at. Andre also continues to have difficulties to express his true feelings towards Nicole and writes it down on paper. Joan tells Sweets she's suspicious and worried about Andre and Sweets convinces Joan to look through Andre's room to confirm if he's up to something. Joan & Sweets finds a letter Andre has been writing down, expressing his feelings towards Nicole. In the letter it's revealed that Andre is in love with Nicole. Andre meets up with Nicole at the party and they have a good time, with Andre telling Nicole he missed her and he got her a present (which is the original copy of his letter telling Nicole he loves her and wants to be with her.) But trouble comes, when a guy rudely steps in front of Nicole. After trying to politely tell the guy that she's in her way, all he does is tell her to move. Andre argues with the guy and gets in his face, telling him to apologize to Nicole. The guy pushes Andre and pulls out the gun, which shocks and terrifies Nicole. Nicole runs out from the party and Andre ends up chasing after her on the RTD bus. Nicole yells at Andre saying he could have gotten them killed. Andre tells Nicole he was only defending her and that he only carries the gun around when he comes to see Nicole. Nicole refuses to believe that saying that he really carries it because he thinks it makes a look tough and to gain respect from the neighborhood. A mortified Nicole decides that her parents were right about Andre. She breaks up with him and tells Andre to get away from her and to get off the bus, but Andre insists on accompanying Nicole on the bus to ensure that she makes it home safely. They ride the bus together without saying a word to each other. After Nicole gets off the bus and Andre is on the bus alone, heading back home, Andre crumbles the letter he was going to give to Nicole. Andre returns the gun back in Joan's bedroom and refuses to ever use it again after what it cost him. Losing the girl he loves. Joan asks Andre if he had a good time at the party, and Andre says no. Stating, "Why does it seem like, you try to do the right thing, and it turns out to be the wrong thing. But why does it seem like the wrong thing is the only thing to do." The episode ends with Andre not telling his mother about the gun but reassuring to Joan that she don't have to worry about Andre cuz he's not going to do the wrong thing.
9	"Dog"	Stan Lathan	Gina Prince	May 31, 1994	1S08
Deion becomes enchanted with a stray dog that begins hanging around the house. The usually emotionless boy smiles, laughs and imitates the dog. Joan fears that the dog has health problems and orders the kids to get rid of it. Andre and Tasha try to follow their mother's instructions, but Deion throws a fit. Andre gets into a fist fight with Rashad after he catches him making out with Tasha's friend Janelle in the Mosely house. The commotion upsets the dog, which bites Janelle. Meanwhile, Andre still can't get Nicole to give him the time of day. The co-op has a "black dollar day."
10	"Date"	W.E. Baker	Kathleen McGhee-Anderson	June 7, 1994	1S09
In the hopes of having the house to herself for a date, Joan sends Deion to Disneyland with Sweets. She also pushes Tasha to go to a teen social night with Andre. Andre ignores Tasha when he and Rashad hook up with two older women, but she quickly makes friends at the gathering. Andre is stunned when he returns to the party to see Tasha performing onstage with the musical guest.

== Syndication ==
Episodes of South Central aired in the United States on TV One.

== Awards and nominations ==
Year	Award	Category	Recipient	Result
1994	Viewers For Quality Television Awards	Founder's Award	South Central	Won
