= List of Ned & Stacey episodes =

This is a list of episodes from the Fox sitcom Ned and Stacey which aired for two seasons from 1995 to 1997. The New York City-set series focused on obsessive-compulsive advertising executive Ned Dorsey and neurotic journalist Stacey Colbert, who have nothing in common except their marriage of convenience. Also featured on the series are Stacey's sister and brother-in-law Amanda and Eric Moyer, the latter of whom is an accountant at Ned's advertising agency and his best friend.

35 of the 46 produced episodes were originally broadcast in the United States on Fox from September 11, 1995, to January 27, 1997. The additional 11 unaired episodes were not aired in the United States, and remained so until the complete series was released on DVD.

== Series overview ==
| Season | Episodes | Originally released | |
| Season | Episodes | First released | Last released |
|---|---|---|---|
| 1 | 24 | September 11, 1995 | April 1, 1996 |
| 2 | 22 (Note: Eleven episodes remained unaired during the series' original run.) | November 17, 1996 | January 27, 1997 |

=== Broadcast history ===
| Season | Time |
|---|---|
| 1995–96 | Monday at 9:30 pm (September 11, 1995 – December 11, 1995); Monday at 9:00 pm (December 18, 1995 – April 1, 1996) |
| 1996–97 | Sunday at 8:30 pm (November 17, 1996 – January 5, 1997); Monday at 9:00 pm (January 6 – 27, 1997) |

== Episodes ==
=== Season 1 (1995–96) ===
| No. overall | No. in season | Title | Directed by | Written by | Original release date | Viewers (millions) |
|---|---|---|---|---|---|---|
| 1 | 1 | "Pilot" | Andrew D. Weyman | Michael J. Weithorn | September 11, 1995 | 10.1 |
In order to get a promotion at the advertising agency he works for, Ned Dorsey (Thomas Haden Church) agrees to enter into a marriage of convenience with journalist Stacey Colbert (Debra Messing), who is desperate to move out of her parents house. Recurring characters: Harry Goz and Dori Brenner as Saul and Ellen Colbert.
| 2 | 2 | "Portrait of a Marriage" | Lee Shallat Chemel | Michael J. Weithorn | September 18, 1995 | 8.6 |
To give the impression of a real marriage at a party for his colleagues, Ned constructs a fictitious history of his relationship with Stacey. Recurring characters: John Getz and Natalia Nogulich as Les and Bernadette McDowell.
| 3 | 3 | "Take My Wife, Please" | Rob Schiller | Tony Sheehan | September 25, 1995 | 6.6 |
After accidentally meeting a handsome British guy, Stacey starts dating him. When she tries to tell him about her fake marriage with Ned, he gets the impression that they're having a real affair. Guest star: Simon Templeman as Nigel Davies.
| 4 | 4 | "Cover Story" | Rob Schiller | Del Shores | October 2, 1995 | 8.1 |
While looking for material for her next article, Stacey receives compromising information regarding one of Ned's biggest clients. After consulting with him, she writes a scathing exposé about the client which ends up harming Ned. Recurring characters: John Getz and Natalia Nogulich as Les and Bernadette McDowell.
| 5 | 5 | "Model Husband" | Terri McCoy | Tony Sheehan | October 9, 1995 | 7.0 |
When Ned hires a gorgeous supermodel for a pick-up truck ad, she ends up getting real close to Eric. When this worries Amanda, Eric decides to take a stand for himself. Guest star: Paulina Porizkova as Alexa Miroslav.
| 6 | 6 | "Saul and Ellen and Ned and Stacey" | Rob Schiller | Amy Welsh | October 16, 1995 | 6.8 |
Stacey realizes that Ned's getting too close to her parents and decides to forbid him from spending time with them. Recurring characters: Harry Goz and Dori Brenner as Saul and Ellen Colbert.
| 7 | 7 | "Here's to You, Mrs. Binder" | Paul Lazarus | Jill Condon & Amy Toomin | October 23, 1995 | 6.5 |
Ned falls in love with Mrs. Binder, an older woman who happens to be the best friend of Stacey's mom. Recurring characters: Harry Goz and Dori Brenner as Saul and Ellen Colbert. Guest star: Joanna Cassidy as Lucy Binder
| 8 | 8 | "Halloween Story" | Rob Schiller | Del Shores | October 30, 1995 | 8.0 |
Ned and Stacey visit a Halloween party at their building, and they end up getting closer than they expected. Guest stars: Scott Paetty as Scott, and Kimberly Quinn as Rhonda
| 9 | 9 | "Reality Check" | Alan Myerson | Tony Sheehan | November 13, 1995 | 7.3 |
When Stacey's finances take a dive into the worst, Ned offers to help her. Guest stars: Loretta Devine as Mrs. Duncan and Olivia Newton-John as herself
| 10 | 10 | "Thanksgiving Day Massacre" | Lee Shallat Chemel | Jill Condon & Amy Toomin & Amy Welsh | November 20, 1995 | 6.5 |
Ned, Stacey, Eric, and Amanda visit the Colberts for a Thanksgiving Day diner. However, a snow storm and other mishaps leads them into a series of family disagreements and disappointments. Recurring characters: Harry Goz and Dori Brenner as Saul and Ellen Colbert. Guest star: Susie Essman as Aunt Ceil
| 11 | 11 | "Sleepless in Manhattan" | Rob Schiller | David Litt | December 4, 1995 | 6.6 |
Ned gives Stacey some illegal help to buy a new bed, by bribing the salesman. However, Stacey finds herself unable to sleep in it due to the guilt for Ned's actions. Guest star: Kevin Meaney as Chuck
| 12 | 12 | "Threesome" | Rob Schiller | Michael J. Weithorn & Tony Sheehan | December 11, 1995 | 7.4 |
When Amanda stumbles with Sam, a friend of her, she introduces him to Ned and Stacey. After knowing about their arrangement, both Ned and Stacey find themselves fighting for Sam's attention as a "buddy" and as a "boyfriend". Guest star: John Slattery as Sam
| 13 | 13 | "Accountus Interruptus" | Lee Shallat Chemel | David Litt | December 18, 1995 | 7.9 |
Ned is bound to sleep with a powerful and sexy client. However, Stacey objects arguing the humiliation it poses with the clients he wants her to impress. Recurring characters: John Getz as Les McDowell Guest star: Claire Stansfield as Jordan, Kathy Griffin as Jeanne
| 14 | 14 | "New Year's Eve" | Alan Myerson | Michael J. Weithorn | January 1, 1996 | 11.8 |
Stacey skips Ned's New Year's Eve party to have a date with a friend, which eventually bothers Ned. Recurring characters: John Getz and Natalia Nogulich as Les and Bernadette McDowell. Guest star: Thomas Calabro as Don Morelli
| 15 | 15 | "Paranoia on the 47th Floor" | Alan Myerson | David Litt | January 8, 1996 | 9.3 |
When Ned's agency hires Clay, a young and smart executive, to work with him, Ned finds himself worried that he might be trying to take his place. Recurring characters: John Getz as Les McDowell, James Karen as Patrick Kirkland Guest star: Tim Conlon as Clay
| 16 | 16 | "A Tender Trap" | Rob Schiller | Amy Welsh | January 15, 1996 | 10.4 |
In order to land Stacey a steady job, Ned starts dating a publishing executive only to realize she is a sex-crazed nymphomaniac. Guest star: Farrah Forke as Megan Foster
| 17 | 17 | "Promotional Rescue" | Rob Schiller | Tony Sheehan | January 22, 1996 | 9.8 |
When Eric's boss retires, Amanda convinces Ned to speak in favor of Eric with their boss. As a result, Eric gets the job, but only to have Ned trying to coerce him into some budget gymnastics. Recurring characters: James Karen as Patrick Kirkland
| 18 | 18 | "Friends and Lovers" | Pamela Fryman | Lisa A. Bannick | February 12, 1996 | 10.1 |
Stacey meets with an old high school rival and tries to impress her with her relationship with Ned. However, she ends up seducing Ned afterwards. Guest star: Lisa Edelstein as Janine
| 19 | 19 | "The Gay Caballeros" | Rob Schiller | Del Shores | February 19, 1996 | 8.7 |
An important new homosexual client of Ned's notices Ned & Stacey's separate living arrangements, assumes they are in a lavender marriage. When Ned tries to explain to him, their business relationship is endangered. Guest star: Stephen Kearney as Brent Barrow
| 20 | 20 | "Gut Feeling" | Alan Myerson | Thomas R. Nance | February 26, 1996 | 9.3 |
Despite pain from a temperamental gall bladder, Ned refuses to be hospitalized. That is until his pain leads him to ruin Howard's birthday party.
| 21 | 21 | "Pals" | Rick Beren | Tony Sheehan & David Litt | March 4, 1996 | 8.7 |
Ned is forced to work with Bobby Van Lowe, a hot and young actor that has to make some PSA's. When he comments he is looking for an apartment, Ned recommends Amanda, but finds himself in the middle of trouble when Bobby makes a pass at Amanda. Guest star: Jason Bateman as Bobby Van Lowe
| 22 | 22 | "It Happened One Night" | Rob Schiller | Jill Condon & Amy Toomin | March 11, 1996 | 9.0 |
After a series of fights, Amanda unknowingly convinces Stacey to move out of Ned's house. As she returns to her parents, both she and Ned find themselves receiving the unexpected advice from the Colberts. Recurring characters: Harry Goz and Dori Brenner as Saul and Ellen Colbert. Guest star: Kenny Johnson as Joey
| 23 | 23 | "You Bet Your Wife" | Rob Schiller | Jill Condon & Amy Toomin & Amy Welsh | March 18, 1996 | 9.8 |
During a poker game with his friends, Ned bets a night with Stacey, only to lose to his main rival in advertisement. Guest star: Brian McNamara as Peter
| 24 | 24 | "The End?: Part 1" | Rob Schiller | Michael J. Weithorn | April 1, 1996 | 10.6 |
Ned and Stacey agree to find a date for each other. Although Stacey's choice ends up being disastrous for Ned, she falls in love with Alex, a friend of Ned. However, her new romance ends up jeopardizing Ned's career and their marriage arrangement. Recurring characters: James Karen as Patrick Kirkland, and Cameron Watson as Alex Palmer

=== Season 2 (1996–97) ===
| No. overall | No. in season | Title | Directed by | Written by | Original release date | Viewers (millions) |
|---|---|---|---|---|---|---|
| 25 | 1 | "The Other End: Part 2" | Rob Schiller | Michael J. Weithorn | November 17, 1996 | 9.6 |
After Ned throws her out of the house, Stacey decides to stay at Alex's house. The next day, Kirkland threatens to fire Ned and tells him to straighten out his life. Meanwhile, Eric takes Ned to a family gathering so Ned can tell Stacey his true feelings. Recurring characters: James Karen as Patrick Kirkland, and Cameron Watson as Alex Palmer. Originally scheduled for premiere on October 27, 1996, but it was pushed up at the behest of Fox executive Peter Roth.
| 26 | 2 | "Dorsey vs. Dorsey" | Rob Schiller | Tony Sheehan | November 24, 1996 | 12.3 |
After throwing Stacey out, Ned goes nuts turning her room into a game room. Stacey moves in with Alex and she gets a lawyer who tells Ned that Stacey is legally entitled to her room. After an incident with Ned, Alex decides to break up with Stacey. She then goes back and Ned doesn't welcome her with open arms. Recurring characters: Cameron Watson as Alex Palmer.
| 27 | 3 | "The Muffins Take Manhattan" | Rob Schiller | David Litt | December 1, 1996 | 11.3 |
Ned learns that his girlfriend is seeing someone else. Recurring characters:
| 28 | 4 | "Computer Dating" | Rob Schiller | Charlie Kaufman | December 15, 1996 | 9.0 |
Stacey comes up with an idea for a popular new ad campaign, much to Ned's chagrin. Meanwhile, Eric begins dating the store's new computer. Recurring characters:
| 29 | 5 | "Les Is More or Less Moral-less" | Rob Schiller | David Litt | December 22, 1996 | 9.0 |
With the divorce looming, Stacey is looking for an apartment. Diana offers Stacey a job as dogs body, then accuses Ned of having feelings for Stacey. Recurring characters: John Getz as Les McDowell, and James Karen as Patrick Kirkland
| 30 | 6 | "Loganberry's Run" | Rob Schiller | Charlie Kaufman | December 29, 1996 | 8.8 |
Amanda thinks there are too many cooks in the muffin shop's kitchen, so she walks out on Ned--but returns after he promises to remain a silent partner. Recurring characters: Kathy Griffin as Jeannie
| 31 | 7 | "It's a Mad, Mad, Mad, Mad Eric" | Rick Beren | Jay Kogen | January 5, 1997 | 8.13 |
Ned finally goes too far with Eric, and a melt-down fight may spell the end of their long friendship. Guest star: Alex Trebek as himself
| 32 | 8 | "Fifteen a-Minutes" | Rob Schiller | Bryan Behar & Steve Baldikoski | January 6, 1997 | 8.51 |
Amanda gets her fifteen minutes of fame when Ned films her in a television commercial and, fed up with the stupid premise, she explodes.
| 33 | 9 | "Prom Night" | Rob Schiller | David Litt | January 13, 1997 | 8.40 |
Amanda finally has a competent staff member: super efficient and cheerful high school senior Amy. Things take an ugly turn when the teenager invites Ned to attend a street festival with her, and he shows up with another woman. Guest star: Jennifer Lyons as Alice
| 34 | 10 | "Saved by the Belvedere" | Rob Schiller | Bryan Behar & Steve Baldikoski | January 20, 1997 | 7.82 |
Christopher Hewett from the long-running sitcom Mr. Belvedere reprises his role as the crusty butler with a heart of gold when his number-one fan Ned enlists the faded star to appear in a commercial he's producing. Guest star: Christopher Hewett as himself
| 35 | 11 | "Where My Third Nepal is Sheriff" | Rob Schiller | Charlie Kaufman | January 27, 1997 | 7.11 |
Ned and Eric are going to Nepal but Eric backs out because of his fear of the unknown. He spends his time cowering. Amanda who has a friend coming to see, hires someone to take care of the muffin store. But Stacey feels insulted that she doesn't trust her. So she puts Stacey in charge and things go to hell.
| 36 | 12 | "Sex, Lies and Commercials" | Rob Schiller | Jennifer Glickman | Unaired | N/A |
A love affair between Ned and a rival advertising executive hides ulterior motives.
| 37 | 13 | "Scenes From a Muffin Shop" | Rob Schiller | Bryan Behar & Steve Baldikoski | Unaired | N/A |
Ned learns that his girlfriend is seeing someone else.
| 38 | 14 | "The Skyward's the Limit" | Rob Schiller | Jennifer Glickman | Unaired | N/A |
Stacey leads a revolt at Skyward Magazine when her editor insists she turn her exposition piece on polluted lakes into a fluffy nature story. Diana flies to LA and Ned starts obsessing.
| 39 | 15 | "The Errand Girl" | Rob Schiller | Jennifer Glickman | Unaired | N/A |
With the divorce looming, Stacey is looking for an apartment. Diana offers Stacey a job as dogs body, then accuses Ned of having feelings for Stacey.
| 40 | 16 | "No Retreat, No Surrender" | Rob Schiller | Roger Reitzel | Unaired | N/A |
Ned's agency is going on retreat to a ski resort. When Stacey finds out, she corners Ned by convincing his boss that she should come along, to give them a chance to work things out.
| 41 | 17 | "The Truth Shall Set You Back" | Rob Schiller | Jennifer Glickman | Unaired | N/A |
Stacey finally gets up the courage to tell her parents that she and Ned are getting a divorce. Ned wants to ensure he stays friends with Stacey's parents.
| 42 | 18 | "I Like Your Moxie" | Rob Schiller | Jay Kogen & David Litt | Unaired | N/A |
When the ad agency gets a new board of directors, Ned is worried. As expected they ask Ned to prove his worth by creating a campaign to sell a client's sponges.
| 43 | 19 | "Please Don't Squeeze the Eric" | Rob Schiller | Bryan Behar & Steve Baldikoski | Unaired | N/A |
Eric has a new boss and she wants him to help out with the annual fiscal review, just like he's always wanted. But she wants more than just his accounting expertise.
| 44 | 20 | "All That Chazz" | Rob Schiller | Jeff Stein | Unaired | N/A |
It's time to finalize the divorce. But there's still some sexual tension to resolve. While working on the paper work, Ned and Stacey find their games taking a more sexual turn.
| 45 | 21 | "Skippy's Revenge" | Rob Schiller | Tony Sheehan & David Litt | Unaired | N/A |
Kirkland's son, Skip, is derailing Ned's brilliant advertising pitches. Stacey is being forced to write yet more fluff. And Amanda still isn't pregnant. All of which leads to copious (attempted) muffin squashing.
| 46 | 22 | "Best of Luck on Future Projects" | Rob Schiller | Michael J. Weithorn | Unaired | N/A |
Ned's been working from the office in the muffin shop, though without a lot of success. His old employer for stealing an account in the last episode is also suing him, a lot. Stacey's found a rent-controlled studio and is moving out.
