= A Little Help =

2010 American comedy-drama film

- Directed by: Michael J. Weithorn
- Written by: Michael J. Weithorn
- Produced by: Dena Hysell; Joe Gressis; Michael J. Weithorn
- Starring: Jenna Fischer; Chris O'Donnell; Rob Benedict; Arden Myrin; Daniel Yelsky; Dion DiMucci
- Cinematography: Thomas M. Harting
- Edited by: Joe Gressis
- Music by: Austin Wintory
- Production company: Secret Handshake Entertainment
- Distributed by: Freestyle Releasing
- Release dates: May 21, 2010 (SIFF); July 22, 2011 (United States)
- Running time: 109 minutes
- Country: United States
- Language: English
- Box office: $96,868

A Little Help is a 2010 American comedy-drama film written and directed by Michael J. Weithorn. It follows the experiences of a dental hygienist following her unfaithful husband's sudden death. It debuted on May 21, 2010, at the Seattle International Film Festival. In the Fall of 2010, the film won the Best Narrative Feature film at the San Diego Film Festival. This was Ron Leibman's final film role before his death on December 6, 2019.

== Plot ==
Laura Pehlke is married to Bob and together they raise their 12-year-old son, Dennis. Laura is a dental hygienist and Bob works in a real estate office and often comes home late. The family goes to a birthday barbecue for Laura's twin niece and nephew. Laura suspects Bob is cheating on her and they get into a fight. She runs away from the house and Bob runs after her and suddenly collapses on the road. After a brief examination, the doctor says Bob has had a panic attack. Later that night, Laura begins to perform fellatio on Bob during which he has another attack from which he dies, and his condition is later diagnosed as arrhythmia.

Laura's sister, Kathy, and mother Joan, are overbearing in their attempts to help Laura manage her life. Kathy insists Laura go to a lawyer to discuss her financial situation. The lawyer advises that the only way to get by with the money they have is to sue the doctor. Reluctantly, Laura cooperates. During the process, Bob's secretary admits that she and Bob had an affair.

Laura's nephew, Kyle, is an enthusiastic guitarist, and his father, Paul, supports him, but Kathy thinks it hinders his academic future. She dismisses the garage band Kyle formed with his friends. Paul, a radio station employee, takes Kyle along to see Dion DiMucci, who is visiting the station. After the program Kyle and Dion meet and play together.

Dennis moves to a private school on the insistence of Joan. In order to gain popularity with the kids at the new school, he lies and says his father died in the September 11 attacks while saving lives as a fireman. Laura confronts her son and criticizes his lying but he persuades her to back up his story and she ends up repeating the story to his class.

Dennis attends a friend's birthday party, where he gets a body painting of the burning World Trade Center on his back. A boy who knew Dennis from summer camp happens to be at the party and he tells the other kids Dennis has been lying. Meanwhile, Laura coincidentally meets the birthday kid's mom at a gas station and learns that the boy is attending the party. Realizing the truth will come out, she rushes to the party, but arrives too late to prevent the damage, finding her son sitting alone and crying, ostracized by the group.

One night Paul and Laura happen to be in the yard together, smoke pot and talking. Paul confesses he has had a crush on Laura since school and he married Kathy because she was her sister and reminded him of Laura, which turned out to be a mistake. Back in high school he tried to get her attention by throwing a tennis ball over the fence and asking her for "a little help" by returning the ball. Some days later, Laura calls Paul at work and invites him to meet her. She tells Paul she regrets not returning the balls back in high school, because now she feels about him like he felt about her. She moves away a little, he comes after her, tells her she is beautiful, and they kiss.

Laura eventually begins to take control of her own life, starting to heal and move on.

== Cast ==
- Jenna Fischer as Laura Pehlke
- Chris O'Donnell as Bob Pehlke
- Daniel Yelsky as Dennis Pehlke
- Jim Florentine as Brian
- Rob Benedict as Paul Helms
- Brooke Smith as Kathy Helms
- Zach Page as Kyle Helms
- Dara Kapner as Wendy Helms
- Kim Coates as Mel Kaminsky
- Leslie Ann Warren as Joan Dunning
- Ron Leibman as Warren Dunning
- Arden Myrin as Ms. Gallagher
- Jacob Levine as Seth Feldman
- Aida Turturro as Nancy Feldman
- James Rebhorn as Dr. Bronstein
- Joy Suprano as Julie Cantoni
- Sam McMurray as Big Bad Dan
- Dion DiMucci as himself

== Reception ==
On the review aggregator website Rotten Tomatoes, 40% of 42 critics' reviews are positive. Metacritic, which uses a weighted average, assigned the film a score of 54 out of 100, based on 21 critics, indicating "mixed or average" reviews.
