= The Best You Can =

2025 romantic comedy film by Michael J. Weithorn

- Release poster
- Directed by: Michael J. Weithorn
- Written by: Michael J. Weithorn
- Produced by: Victoria Hill; Andrew Mann; Kyra Sedgwick; Kevin Bacon; Michael J. Weithorn; Andrew Wonder
- Starring: Kyra Sedgwick; Kevin Bacon; Judd Hirsch; Brittany O'Grady
- Cinematography: Andrew Wonder
- Edited by: Tricia Holmes
- Music by: Kurt Farquhar
- Production company: Fibbonaci Films
- Distributed by: Sony Pictures Home Entertainment
- Release dates: June 7, 2025 (Tribeca); November 25, 2025 (United States)
- Running time: 103 minutes
- Country: United States
- Language: English

The Best You Can is a 2025 American romantic comedy film written, produced and directed by Michael J. Weithorn. The film stars married couple Kyra Sedgwick and Kevin Bacon for their first on-screen appearance since Cavedweller and The Woodsman (2004).

The film premiered at the 2025 Tribeca Festival on June 7, 2025.

== Cast ==
- Kyra Sedgwick as Cynthia Rand
- Kevin Bacon as Stan Olszewski
- Judd Hirsch as Warren Rand
- Brittany O'Grady as Sammi
- Olivia Luccardi as CJ Moretti
- Ray Romano as Doug Finkelman
- Victor Williams as Jerome
- Misha Brooks as Henry Gallo
- Heather Burns as Rosemary

== Production ==
In January 2024, it was reported that Michael J. Weithorn would direct and write a romantic comedy film, with Kyra Sedgwick, Kevin Bacon, Judd Hirsch, and Brittany O'Grady set to star. Production had begun under the working title Connescence in and around Brooklyn. In March 2024, it was reported that production had just concluded.

== Release ==
The Best You Can had its world premiere at the 2025 Tribeca Festival on June 7, 2025, during the Spotlight Narrative section. It was digitally released on November 25, 2025 by Sony Pictures Home Entertainment.

=== Critical reception ===
On the review aggregator website Rotten Tomatoes, 87% of 15 critics' reviews are positive. On Metacritic, the film has a weighted average score of 56 out of 100 based on 6 critics, which the site labels as "mixed or average" reviews.
