= Weird Loners =

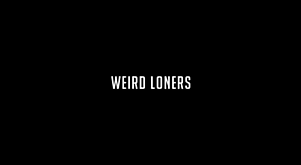
- Genre: Sitcom
- Created by: Michael J. Weithorn
- Starring: Becki Newton; Zachary Knighton; Nate Torrence; Meera Rohit Kumbhani
- Composer: Lyle Workman
- Country of origin: United States
- Original language: English
- No. of seasons: 1
- No. of episodes: 6

Production
- Executive producers: Michael J. Weithorn; Jake Kasdan; Melvin Mar
- Camera setup: Single-camera
- Running time: 22 minutes
- Production companies: Hanley Productions; The Detective Agency; 20th Century Fox Television

Original release
- Network: Fox
- Release: March 31 – May 5, 2015

Weird Loners is an American sitcom that was created by Michael J. Weithorn. The 6-episode first season was ordered straight-to-series by the Fox network in 2014. The series is executive produced by Weithorn and Jake Kasdan. The series premiered on March 31, 2015.

On May 11, 2015, Fox canceled the series after one season. Kevin Reilly, the network President who had ordered the series from Weithorn's spec script in 2013, was fired a few months later leaving the series without a champion at the network.

== Premise ==
Four people who fear personal relationships are unexpectedly thrust into one another's lives and form an unlikely bond while living in a townhouse in Queens, New York.

== Cast ==
- Becki Newton as Caryn Goldfarb, a high-strung dental hygienist who suddenly decides to call off her engagement after a brief fling with Stosh
- Zachary Knighton as Stosh Lewandowski, Eric's sleazy cousin, whose womanizing lifestyle has recently cost him his job. With no job and nowhere to live, he is forced to move in with his cousin Eric.
- Nate Torrence as Eric Lewandowski, a toll collector who is suddenly on his own for the first time after his father unexpectedly passes away. After the funeral, his estranged cousin Stosh offers to move in with him.
- Meera Rohit Kumbhani as Zara Sandhu, an angst-ridden artist, who befriends Eric after he buys one of her paintings

=== Recurring ===
- Susie Essman as Evelyn Goldfarb, Caryn's mother
- David Wain as Howard, Caryn's ex-fiancé

== Critical reception ==
Weird Loners received mixed reviews, with Rotten Tomatoes giving the series a score of 44% based on reviews from 25critics and an average rating of 5.5 out of 10. The website’s consensus reads: "Weird Loners strands its veteran stars in an overly familiar sitcom structure burdened with a preponderance of humdrum humor."

Neil Genzlinger of The New York Times gave the series a positive review, stating: "[Weird Loners is] not loud or frenetic. It’s not particularly cutting-edge. It’s just funny, in a relaxed way that’s welcome somehow in a television spectrum full of pushiness and intensity."

Gwen Ihnat of The A.V. Club wrote a positive review giving the series a "B+" grade. She observed that "What Weird Loners has in its corner is an appealing cast and some hard-hitting TV vets" and remarked that "Since [Jake] Kasdan and [Michael J.] Weithorn both know their way around a sitcom set, it’s not a surprise that Weird Loners soon adds more gravity than most new shows boast from right out of the gate."

== Episodes ==
No.	Title	Directed by	Written by	Original release date	Prod. code	US viewers (millions)
1	"Weird Pilot"	Jake Kasdan	Michael J. Weithorn	March 31, 2015	1AXS01	1.89
Four very different individuals end up sharing a townhouse in Queens.
2	"Weird Dance"	Jake Kasdan	Michael J. Weithorn	April 7, 2015	1AXS02	1.71
Caryn visits her grandmother to tell her why she called off her wedding engagement. At the same time, Zara helps Eric deal with his father's death by pretending to communicate with the man from the hereafter.
3	"Weirded Out"	Bill Purple	David Litt & Michael J. Weithorn	April 14, 2015	1AXS05	1.39
Caryn and Zara are extremely pleased that Stosh is cooking dinners for them and Eric, until they discover he has been using food pilfered from their kitchen. At the same time, Stosh is in debt to "a very scary man named Tulip", and pays him off with some of the money Eric gives him to buy a new television for him. Guest star: Jay Onrait
4	"Weird Knight"	Reggie Hudlin	David Litt & Michael J. Weithorn	April 21, 2015	1AXS04	1.21
Caryn does Eric a favor by going to dinner with a nerdy member of his human chess league, but is upset when the guy doesn't give her a follow-up call. Meanwhile, Stosh enters Zara in an art contest.
5	"The Weirdfather"	Christine Gernon	Michael J. Weithorn & Danielle Uhlarik	April 28, 2015	1AXS03	1.42
After Stosh meets his 12-year-old son for the first time, the two bond over watching The Godfather. Meanwhile, Zara must deal with Caryn after she turns clingy and overbearing in their budding friendship.
6	"We're Here. We're Weird. Get Used to Us."	Robert Cohen	Rebecca Drysdale & Laura Valdivia	May 5, 2015	1AXS06	1.55
The gang goes to a lesbian bar where Caryn and Stosh compete for the same woman.
