= The Pursuit of Happiness (1987 TV series) =

- Genre: Sitcom
- Created by: Michael J. Weithorn
- Starring: Paul Provenza; Brian Keith
- Theme music composer: Music by Gordon Lustig and Mark Mattson; Lyrics by Gordon Lustig
- Opening theme: "Keep On Dreaming" performed by Mendy Lee; Produced & Arranged by Mark Mattson
- Country of origin: United States
- Original language: English
- No. of seasons: 1
- No. of episodes: 10 (list of episodes)

Production
- Camera setup: Multi-camera
- Running time: 30 minutes
- Production companies: Hanley Productions; 20th Century Fox Television

Original release
- Network: ABC
- Release: October 30, 1987 – January 8, 1988

The Pursuit of Happiness is an American sitcom that aired from October 30, 1987, until January 8, 1988.

== Premise ==
A history professor gets a job at a small college in Philadelphia.

== Cast ==
- Paul Provenza as Asst. Prof. David Hanley
- Brian Keith as Professor Roland G. Duncan
- Judie Aronson as Sara Duncan
- Wendel Meldrum as Margaret Callahan
- Wesley Thompson as Vernon Morris
- Magic Johnson as himself
- Kevin Scannell as Thomas Jefferson
- Wanda De Jesus as Mrs. Lopez

== Episodes ==
| No. | Title | Directed by | Written by | Original release date | Prod. code |
|---|---|---|---|---|---|
| 1 | "The Arrival" | Art Wolff | Michael J. Weithorn, John Steven Owens, Anne Kenney | October 30, 1987 | 5E01 |
David Hanley comes to Philadelphia to be an assistant professor for his idol, Professor Roland Duncan.
| 2 | "Together Again" | Art Wolff | Michael J. Weithorn, John Steven Owens, Anne Kenney | November 6, 1987 | 5E02 |
Professor Duncan asks David for help with an article.
| 3 | "The Defiant Ones" | Art Wolff | S : James MacNerland, Michael J. Weithorn; T : Michael J. Weithorn | November 13, 1987 | 5E03 |
David and Vernon has discrepancy in their recollections about their times as college roommates.
| 4 | "Thirty" | Art Wolff | Anne Kenney | November 20, 1987 | 5E04 |
Everybody forgets David's 30th birthday.
| 5 | "Advice and Consent" | Art Wolff | Anne Kenney | November 27, 1987 | 5E05 |
David defends Margaret against a professor called "Fast Phil".
| 6 | "Put to the Test" | Art Wolff | Anne Kenney | December 4, 1987 | 5E06 |
David helps a football star with mandatory drug testing.
| 7 | "Boys Night Out" | Art Wolff | S : James MacNerland, Michael J. Weithorn; T : Michael J. Weithorn | December 11, 1987 | 5E07 |
David and Vernon takes Duncan out for a night on the town.
| 8 | "That Pair of Eyes" | Art Wolff | Todd W. Langen | December 11, 1987 | 5E08 |
Sara gets a new boyfriend. David tries to make something more out of a platonic relationship.
| 9 | "Uphill Skiing" | Art Wolff | Joelyn Grippo | December 18, 1987 | 5E09 |
Sara goes skiing, against her father's wishes.
| 10 | "A History Lesson" | Art Wolff | Michael J. Weithorn | January 8, 1988 | 5E10 |
Margaret tries to help Sara with her history class.
