= Ned and Stacey =

- Main cast
- Created by: Michael J. Weithorn
- Starring: Thomas Haden Church; Debra Messing; Greg Germann; Nadia Dajani
- Composer: Kurt Farquhar
- Country of origin: United States
- Original language: English
- No. of seasons: 2
- No. of episodes: 46 (11 unaired) (list of episodes)

Production
- Executive producer: Michael J. Weithorn
- Producers: W.E. Baker; Del Shores (season 1); Rob Schiller (season 2); Charlie Kaufman (season 2)
- Cinematography: Kenneth Peach Jr.
- Editors: John Neal (season 1); John Doutt (season 2)
- Camera setup: Multi-camera
- Running time: 30 minutes
- Production companies: Hanley Productions; TriStar Television

Original release
- Network: Fox
- Release: September 11, 1995 – January 27, 1997

Ned and Stacey is an American sitcom created by Michael J. Weithorn, and starring Thomas Haden Church and Debra Messing as the eponymous couple. The series lasted two seasons and was produced by Hanley Productions and TriStar Television, airing on Fox from September 11, 1995, to January 27, 1997.

Eleven episodes remained unaired during the series' original run.

== Premise ==
For Ned Dorsey (Church) to get a promotion at the ad agency where he works, he needs a wife. Stacey Colbert (Messing) is desperate to move out of her parents' house and find a place to live in New York City but cannot afford an apartment as a freelance journalist. So Stacey reluctantly agrees to pretend to be Ned's wife.

The first season revolved around Ned and Stacey's adjustment to their new situation, while they attempt to make their marriage appear real while dating other people. In the second season, Stacey moves out, and the two begin dating other people. Their constant bickering seems to evolve into something resembling a romance, but the series was cancelled before this could be fully developed.

=== Intro dialogue ===
(Spoken during the opening theme)
Ned: Why Stacey?
Stacey: Why Ned?
Ned: It was business.
Stacey: Strictly business.
Ned: Here's the deal – to get a promotion, I needed a wife.
Stacey: To get a life, I needed his apartment.
Ned: So what the hell, we up and got married.
Stacey: The only thing we have in common? We irritate each other.
Ned: Right! Enjoy the show.

This introduction does not appear in the first few episodes.

== Episodes ==
Season	Episodes	Originally released	
Season	Episodes	First released	Last released
1	24	September 11, 1995	April 1, 1996
2	22 (Note: Eleven episodes remained unaired during the series' original run.)	November 17, 1996	January 27, 1997

== Cast ==
=== Main ===
Thomas Haden Church as Ned Dorsey
An uptight advertising executive, he marries Stacey to get a promotion. Ned is initially portrayed as a self-absorbed egomaniac who uses anyone to get ahead, but he starts developing compassion and empathy for his friends, especially Stacey. Eventually, Ned falls in love with Stacey, but the series was cancelled before this was further developed.
Debra Messing as Stacey Colbert Dorsey
A beautiful, red-haired journalist with a degree from Brandeis University, she marries Ned to get out of her parents' house and live in his apartment, which has a nice view of Central Park. She begins the show as a freelance journalist, but eventually lands a job writing for an airline magazine, Skyward. Messy and neurotic, she often plays as a counterbalance for Ned's more uptight nature. Eventually, Stacey falls in love with Ned, but the series was cancelled before this was further developed.
Greg Germann as Eric "Rico" Moyer
Stacey's brother-in-law, Amanda's husband, and Ned's best friend, he is an accountant at Ned's advertising firm. Called Rico by Ned, he is slightly nerdy in a good natured way, and his straight down-the-middle persona is often used to counter Ned's antics. Eric is a mellow person, who is always being used by Ned in his personal schemes. He does not mind it, since he idolizes his friend. He seldom stands up for himself, and Amanda often steps in when things threaten to get out of hand. Ned is the only person to call him Rico.
Nadia Dajani as Amanda Colbert Moyer
Stacey's older sister, and Eric's wife, she is openly critical of the fake marriage in general and Ned in particular. During season one, Amanda was working as a high-end real estate agent. After a property investment with Ned goes wrong, she finds herself running a muffin store, Amanda's Amuffins, during season two. Eric and she have one son, named Howard. As opposed to Stacey, Amanda is strong, well-organized, and cynical. She loves Eric, and often pushes him around, but most often she does this to make him stand up for himself or act on otherwise lost opportunities.

=== Recurring ===
- Harry Goz as Saul Colbert, father of Stacey and Amanda
- Dori Brenner as Ellen Colbert, mother of Stacey and Amanda
- James Karen as Patrick Kirkland, Ned's boss
- John Getz as Les McDowell, Ned's colleague at the agency
- Natalia Nogulich as Bernadette McDowell, Les' alcoholic wife
- Marcia Cross as Diana Huntley, Ned's girlfriend in the second season
- Andrew Arons as Howard Moyer, Amanda and Eric's son
- Ford Rainey as Nate
- Eddie McClintock as Chazz Gordon
- Ellen Albertini Dow as Mrs. Palmer

=== Notable guest stars ===
Note: relevant episode given in parentheses.

- Alan Oppenheimer as Spencer Haywood ("Pilot")
- Simon Templeman as Nigel Davies ("Take My Wife, Please")
- Paulina Porizkova as Alexa Miroslav ("Model Husband")
- Joanna Cassidy as Lucy Binder ("Here's to You, Mrs. Binder")
- Loretta Devine as Mrs. Duncan ("Reality Check")
- Olivia Newton-John as herself ("Reality Check")
- Susie Essman as Aunt Ceil ("Thanksgiving Day Massacre")
- Kevin Meaney as Chuck ("Sleepless in Manhattan")
- John Slattery as Sam ("Threesome")
- Kathy Griffin as Jeanne ("Accountus Interruptus")
- Farrah Forke as Megan Foster ("A Tender Trap")
- Lisa Edelstein as Janine ("Friends and Lovers")
- Jason Bateman as Bobby Van Lowe ("Pals")
- Kenny Johnson as Joey ("It Happened One Night")
- Greg Grunberg as Nick ("You Bet Your Wife")
- Alex Trebek as himself ("It's a Mad, Mad, Mad, Mad Eric")
- Sara Rue as Amy ("Prom Night")
- Jennifer Lyons as Alice ("Prom Night")
- Christopher Hewett as himself ("Saved by the Belvedere")
- Megan Mullally as Wendy ("Where My Third Nepal Is Sheriff ")
  - Messing and Mullally later went on to co-star in the more successful Will & Grace, as Grace Adler and Karen Walker, respectively.
- Lloyd Bridges as himself ("Skippy's Revenge")

== Ratings ==
Season	Timeslot (EDT)	Season premiere	Season finale	Season	Rank	Nielsen rating	Ref
1	Monday 9:30 pm (1-12); Monday 9:00 pm (13-24)	September 11, 1995	April 1, 1996	1995–96	121	6.0	
2	Sunday 8:30 pm (1-7); Monday 9:00 pm (8-11)	November 17, 1996	January 27, 1997	1996–97	108	6.1	

== Syndication ==
The series has been aired in the United Kingdom on channel Sony TV, which began airing the show on April 7, 2011, the day of the channel's launch. After its cancellation, the show reran on the USA Network from 1999 to 2001. The show later reran on WE: Women's Entertainment from 2003 to 2005. TV Guide Network began airing reruns of the show on September 12, 2011. Oxygen also occasionally airs the show, usually on Thursday at 6 am EST. In Australia, digital channel 7mate has been showing reruns of the series in 2011. In the United States, Rural TV began airing reruns on occasion and was shown in 2015 on FamilyNet.

== Home media ==
In September 2005, Sony Pictures Home Entertainment released the first season of Ned and Stacey on DVD in Region 1. Due to low sales, season two's DVD release was cancelled. In 2014, Mill Creek Entertainment acquired the rights to the series, and released two compilation discs of the show.

On June 7, 2017, Shout! Factory announced it had acquired the rights to the series, and subsequently released Ned and Stacey – The Complete Series on DVD in Region 1 on September 26, 2017.

DVD name	Ep #	Release date
The Complete First Season	24	September 20, 2005
The Complete Series	46	September 26, 2017
