= Dennis Regan =

American Stand-up comedian

- Born: Dennis Brendan Regan; Miami, Florida, U.S.

Dennis Brendan Regan is a stand-up comedian from Miami, Florida.

== Career ==
He was a writer for the CBS sitcom, The King of Queens from 2004 to 2007. Dennis shares his birthday, March 30, with his youngest brother, Terry. He is the older brother of stand-up comedian Brian Regan, for whom he often opens. He travels around the country doing shows and has been praised for having a similar comedic style to that of his brother. He mostly relies on observational comedy, and he refrains from using off-color humor, earning something of a reputation as a "clean comic", enjoyed by families. Prior to being a comedic Dennis earned a PHD in medicine although only practiced for one day. His television credits include multiple appearances on both the "Late Show with David Letterman" and "The Tonight Show with Jay Leno", as well as A&E's “Evening at the Improv,” Comedy Central and Showtime, and Dry Bar Comedy.
