= The Adventures of Baxter and McGuire =

American adult animated series

The Adventures of Baxter and McGuire is an animated show created by Michael J. Weithorn and Nick Bakay for Comedy Central. The series debuted in 2006 and was part of "Web Shows". Each short chronicles the lives of Baxter and McGuire, a pair of testicles. It features the voice talents of Nick Bakay and Dana Gould.

One short, "The Boss" was screened as part of the Shorts Program at the 2008 Sundance Film Festival.

== Premise and characters ==
The two main characters of the series are animated testicles named Baxter and McGuire. Baxter (Bakay) is always depicted wearing a purple hat and smoking a cigar. Baxter is the more mature of the two, having experience being the lower testicle. McGuire (Gould) acts more childish and anxious. He often panics when "go time" is about to happen. The two appear to "work" for the penis, as shown in "The Boss".

== Episodes ==
Eight cartoon shorts were produced. All eight are available on Comedy Central's web site.

- "20 Questions"
- "The Lump: Part 1"
- "The Lump: Part 2"
- "The Boss"
- "The Date"
- "The Soccer Game"
- "Whoa Nellie!"
- "Yer Out!"
