= Michael J. Weithorn =

American screenwriter

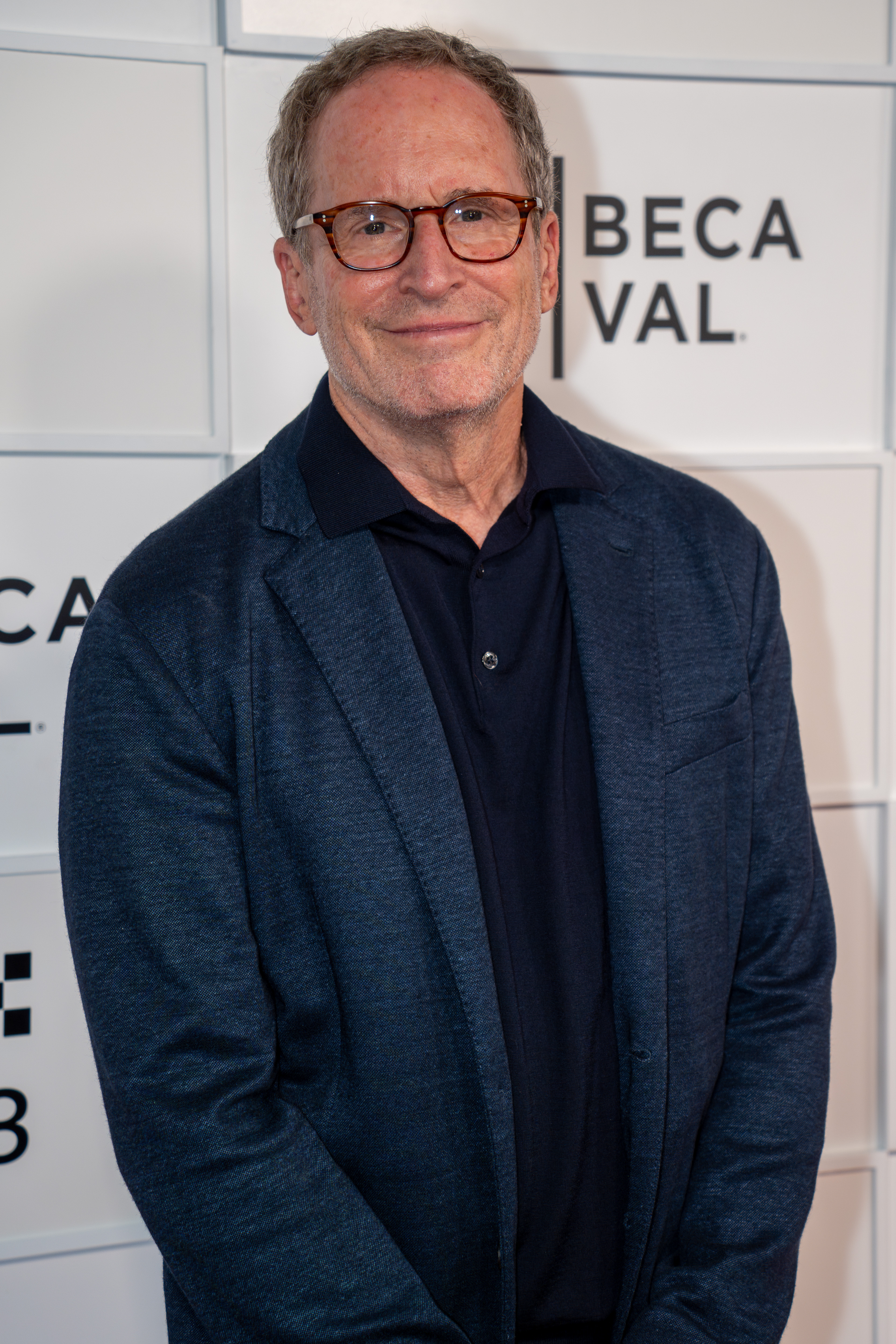
Michael J. Weithorn during The Best You Can premiere at the 2025 Tribeca Festival

Michael J. Weithorn is an American writer, director, and producer whose works include the sitcom The King of Queens.

== Early life ==
Weithorn was raised first in the Fresh Meadows neighborhood of the New York City borough of Queens, and then in Port Washington, New York, on Long Island. He graduated Swarthmore College in Swarthmore, Pennsylvania in 1978 with a Bachelor of Arts degree in political science.

== Career ==
After arriving in Los Angeles and teaching high school for three years, Weithorn's first major writing opportunity was an episode of the television series Benson in 1981. In 1982 he passed up an opportunity to become part of the original writing staff of Late Night With David Letterman to work with producer Gary David Goldberg on Goldberg's new series Family Ties. From 1982 to 1986 Weithorn was a story consultant and then producer on 102 episodes of Family Ties, writing 26 of the episodes during his tenure on the show. During that same time, he also wrote episodes for other TV shows, including Cheers. He worked for Ubu Productions until 1986, when he founded Hanley Productions with a contract at 20th Century Fox Television and ABC.

He began creating TV series of his own after leaving Family Ties in 1986, including The Pursuit of Happiness (1987), True Colors (1990–1992), South Central (1994) and Ned and Stacey (1995–1997).

In 1998, he created The King of Queens with David Litt. The show ran until 2007, when Weithorn wrote the hour-long finale episode, "China Syndrome".

In 2006, he co-created (with Nick Bakay) the Comedy Central animated web series The Adventures of Baxter and McGuire, an episode of which was also shown at the Sundance Film Festival.

In 2010, he wrote and directed the feature film A Little Help, which stars Jenna Fischer, Chris O'Donnell and Rob Benedict.

In 2013 he served as Executive Consultant during the first season of "The Goldbergs", writing two episodes.

In 2015, Weithorn created and executive produced the short-lived Fox midseason sitcom Weird Loners, starring Becki Newton and Zachary Knighton.

In 2025, Weithorn wrote and directed the feature comedy "The Best You Can" starring Kevin Bacon, Kyra Sedgwick, Judd Hirsch, and Brittany O'Grady. The film premiered at the 2025 Tribeca Film Festival.

== Awards ==
Weithorn has five Emmy nominations. In 1984, he was nominated for an Emmy for his work on Family Ties along with the show's other producers. One year later, he was nominated again for Family Ties, both times in the category of Outstanding Comedy Series. In 1986, Weithorn was nominated for two Emmys for Family Ties, one for producing and the other for Outstanding Writing in a Comedy Series. In 1989, he was nominated for another Writing Emmy for his work on the TV series The Wonder Years. In 2007, he was nominated for a Daytime Emmy for "Best Outstanding Broadband Program – Comedy" for The Adventures of Baxter and McGuire. In 2010, Weithorn's film A Little Help was the winner of best feature at several major film festivals.

Weithorn won a Writers Guild of America award in 1985 for his work on an episode of Cheers.

== Filmography ==
Year	Title	Role	Note(s)
1981	Benson	Writer	Episode: "Stress"
1982	Making the Grade	Writer/Story Editor	2 episodes
1982-89	Family Ties	Producer/Supervising Producer/Writer/Story Consultant	170 episodes
1983	Cheers	Writer	Episode: "Sumner's Return"
1985	Family Ties Vacation	Writer	TV movie
1987-88	Pursuit of Happiness	Creator/Executive Producer	15 episodes
1988	The Wonder Years	Writer	Episode: "Our Miss White"
1990-91	The Rock	Creator/Executive Producer	20 episodes
1990-92	True Colors	Creator/Executive Producer	95 episodes
1993-94	The Sinbad Show	Executive Producer/Writer	9 episodes
1994	South Central	Creator/Executive Producer	21 episodes
1995-97	Ned and Stacey	Creator/Executive Producer	99 episodes
1998-2007	The King of Queens	Creator/Executive Producer/Creative Consultant/Executive Consultant/Director	207 episodes
2006	The Adventures of Baxter & McGuire	Writer	
2008	The Adventures of Baxter & McGuire: The Boss	Writer	Short
2010	A Little Help	Writer/Director	Feature film
2013	The Sidekick	Co-Executive Producer/Director	Short
2013-14	The Goldbergs	Consulting Producer/Writer	24 episodes
2015	Weird Loners	Creator/Executive Producer	16 episodes
2019	Schooled	Writer/Consulting Producer	14 episodes
2025	The Best You Can	Director/Writer/Producer	Feature film
TBA	Sunday Night Dinner		In development
