= China Syndrome (The King of Queens) =

- The King of Queens episodes
- Episode nos.: Season 9 Episodes 12/13
- Directed by: Rob Schiller
- Written by: Michael J. Weithorn
- Editing by: John Doutt
- Production code: 912/913
- Original air date: May 14, 2007

Episode chronology
| ← Previous "Single Spaced" | Next → — |

"China Syndrome" is the series finale of the American sitcom The King of Queens. The episode has the length of two regular episodes, being counted as the twelfth and thirteenth episodes of the ninth season, and the 206th and the 207th episodes overall, running about 45 minutes without commercials. It was recorded March 15, 2007, and originally aired on CBS on May 14, 2007. The episode was written by series co-creator Michael J. Weithorn and directed by Rob Schiller.

== Plot ==
Doug is furious when he learns Carrie has not given up the apartment in Manhattan as she promised, despite quitting his job as an IPS driver in favor of a new job as a salesperson at her request. Doug does not want to attend her father Arthur's wedding to Ava St. Clair, which takes place in Poughkeepsie; instead, he stays at home watching The Price is Right, and several references to the game show are made, including contestants bidding on a prize, and Doug yelling to the TV that "the Rice-a-Roni is much cheaper than the Turtle Wax" and ranting about how "Ensign Curtis just cost himself a trip to the Showcase Showdown". However, his best friend Deacon Palmer takes him to Poughkeepsie anyway.

Ava St. Clair reveals to Carrie that after a few failed marriages, she now only marries gay men. Ava later learns that Arthur is not gay and promptly leaves the ceremony without informing Arthur. Carrie attempts to comfort Arthur by telling him, "She had wanted a companion." Arthur refuses to announce that the wedding is off, and proposes to Veronica Olchin, Spence's mother in the men's room. She at first declines, but later accepts. Carrie and Spence are both surprised and against the decision. The ceremony is performed by Rabbi Feldman, because the original bride Ava was Jewish, although neither Arthur nor Veronica is Jewish. The wedding ends with Arthur smashing a glass with his foot, while everyone cheers, "Mazel tov!".

Immediately afterward, Carrie is notified that the baby she and Doug wanted to adopt, Ming-Mei, is waiting for them in Beijing. However, Doug does not want to go through with the adoption process because of her betrayal regarding the apartment. A very pregnant Holly also shows up at the wedding, as does the Heffernans’ neighbor, Lou Ferrigno. When Lou tries to cheer everyone up by proclaiming it's "such a happy day," he is met with unhappy expressions.

Spence apologizes to Danny for how things ended when he moved out. Danny forgives him, but when Spence alludes to moving back in, Danny reveals he has a girlfriend (and roommate), Sandy, thereby declining.

Doug then makes an offer to Spence to become his new roommate, since he is divorcing Carrie, but later retracts the offer when Holly tells him her story. At this point, it is also revealed that Holly's husband left her. Very drunk, Doug challenges each of them to a wrestling match, but falls asleep while fighting with Holly. When Arthur learns that Doug is unable to toast him as his best man due to him being intoxicated, he pitches the role to Spence, who turns it down. Ultimately, Deacon is forced to make the toast despite not knowing Arthur very well.

Holly and Spence talk and realize that they both do not have a place to stay, so they decide to get an apartment together. Danny returns without Sandy, and suggests that Spence and he move back in together. Spence happily accepts, leaving Holly without a place to stay once again.

Meanwhile, Kelly points out to Carrie that she should not feel so guilty about keeping the apartment because Doug has let Carrie down many times in the past. Carrie is convinced and tells Doug off. Both decide that they want to get Ming-Mei for themselves and race to beat each other to China. While Carrie leaves the house first, Doug has to find his passport, which Deacon locates in the vegetable crisper. Back at the wedding, Holly meets Rabbi Feldman and they hit it off; Holly decides to move in with him and convert to Judaism.

Doug later surprises Carrie aboard the plane, and they use the long flight to sort out their problems and remain together. After getting Ming-Mei from the adoption agency, Carrie discovers she is pregnant. She is scared about the changes to come, but Doug is optimistic that they will be able to handle it together.

The episode fast-forwards one year and shows Doug and Carrie each carrying one of their crying infant children attempting to calm them down. Arthur suddenly barges in through the front door with a suitcase, announcing that he and Veronica's marriage "didn't work out." Suitcase in hand, he goes straight to the basement, leaving Doug and Carrie confused.

The episode ends with a three-minute montage of scenes from the show's nine seasons to A Million Billion's song "Milk & Honey". As the song concludes, the series ends with a final screen shot: "thanks for the ride...". This montage is not included in the version released on Blu-ray or in syndication; in those versions, the episode ends immediately after the living room scene.

== Cast ==
- Kevin James as Doug Heffernan
- Leah Remini as Carrie Heffernan
- Jerry Stiller as Arthur Spooner
- Victor Williams as Deacon Palmer
- Patton Oswalt as Spence Olchin
- Merrin Dungey as Kelly Palmer
- Nicole Sullivan as Holly Shumpert
- Anne Meara as Veronica
- Lou Ferrigno as Himself
- Lainie Kazan as Ava St. Clair
- Josh Cooke as Rabbi Feldman
- Jillian Bach as Sandy
- Jackie Flynn as Band Leader
- Adam Ferrara as Waiter
- Carla Ferrigno as Carla
- Shelby Adamowsky as Eloise
- Shannon Farrara as Shannon

== Original airings by country ==
- USA – The episode originally aired on CBS on May 14, 2007. It ranked #12 in the Nielsen ratings that week, with 13.61 million viewers. The ninth season average was #33, with 11.4 million viewers, which was higher than the previous two seasons. CBS also aired an encore of the episode on May 24, 2007.
- Germany – The dubbed double episode was aired at 9:15pm on October 15, 2007, on Kabel 1. It was watched by 2.49 million viewers. In the target group 14-49, the episode had 16.4% market share, winning the night in this important demo and beating Lost.
- AUS – In the regular 7:00 pm timeslot on Weeknights during summer (non-ratings period) on the Nine Network, episode 11 was shown at 7:00 pm followed by the finale as an hour-long special at 7:30pm on December 19, 2007. Nine also showed the series's three-minute montage of scenes at 8:30pm. Repeats continued to air at 7pm until January 25, 2008, and was replaced by Two and a Half Men, another American sitcom on January 28, 2008. Foxtel, subscription TV distributor also showed hour-long special on June 12, 2009, at 6:00pm, as well as the three-minute montage at 7:00pm on 111 Hits.
- UK – In a regular hour-long slot on Tuesdays at 21:00 on Paramount Comedy 1, episodes 11 and 12 were shown on March 11, 2008. Rather than showing the finale as an hour-long special, episode 13 (minus the three-minute montage) was shown the following week on March 18, followed by the first episode of season 1.

== See also ==
- List of The King of Queens episodes
