= Carrie Heffernan =

Fictional character in the TV series The King of Queens

- First appearance: "Pilot" (episode 1.01)
- Last appearance: "China Syndrome" (episode 9.13)
- Portrayed by: Leah Remini

In-universe information
- Alias: Penelope Van Smythe; Simone Spooner
- Gender: Female
- Occupation: Legal secretary (seasons 1–6); Real estate firm secretary (seasons 6–9)
- Family: Arthur Spooner (father); Sophia Spooner (mother); Sara Spooner (half-sister)
- Spouse: Doug Heffernan
- Children: Ming-Mei Heffernan (adopted); Baby Boy Heffernan (biological; Doug Jr.)
- Relatives: Joe Heffernan (father-in-law); Janet Heffernan (mother-in-law); Chester Spooner (uncle); Simone Spooner (cousin); Skitch Spooner (paternal half-uncle); Stephanie Heffernan (sister-in-law); Danny Heffernan (cousin-in-law)

Carrie Heffernan is a fictional character in the American sitcom The King of Queens. She appears in all of the show's nine seasons and is one of the show's three central characters. The character is portrayed by Leah Remini and lives in Rego Park, Queens, with her husband Doug Heffernan (Kevin James), and her father Arthur Spooner (Jerry Stiller).

Carrie works as a legal secretary during the first six seasons and as a real estate firm secretary for the last three seasons.

== Character profile ==
Carrie Heffernan (born in Manhattan on January 19, 1969) is the sharp-tongued wife of Doug Heffernan (Kevin James). Her father, Arthur Spooner (Jerry Stiller), lives in the couple's basement after losing his home in a fire. Carrie was born Simone Spooner but when she was a child, Arthur lost her name in a poker game which necessitated a switch of name with her cousin Carrie. Carrie's mother Sophia insisted on having "mother to Simone" engraved on her tombstone. Carrie originally had a sister (or probably, and more specifically, a paternal half-sister) named Sara (Lisa Rieffel) who moved in along with Arthur, but after the first season, the character was dropped. Little is known about Carrie's mother Sophia, except that she died when Carrie was 15, leaving Carrie in a state of confusion and loss. Although it was later stated her birthday was July 16, 1971, in Season 1 Episode 15 titled "Crappy Birthday" which aired February 1, 1999, it is stated her birthday is "this Friday the 19th" and February 19, 1999 did land on a Friday. Also in this episode it is snowing during her birthday dinner, making it nearly impossible to be in July in New York City.

The coupling of Carrie and Doug in the King of Queens is an attempt to create a subtle "beauty and the beast" scenario in modern times. Carrie is a beautiful woman with an attractive figure, whereas Doug is a sloppy dresser and over-eater who doesn't take his fitness, health or weight gain seriously. He makes no excuses for his love of food or his desire to watch as much TV as he possibly can. It is a deliberate mismatch of looks, allowing the storyline to compensate by evolving the good chemistry between them, displaying overt affection to one another, and building their love story, independent of how different they are. As the seasons progress however, Doug begins to lose weight, become more fit, and become more attractive to women in particular. This begins to irritate Carrie, who had always been the one that stood out to everyone who knew or met them. Carrie does make it clear over the years, that she "could have done better" (than Doug), but its obvious that she loves him and in the end is satisfied with her choice.

As the story is told, after difficult teenage years, Carrie met her future husband Doug Heffernan one night at a bar, where she originally met Doug's friend from school, Richie Ianucci (Larry Romano,) who wanted to bed Carrie. Doug invited Richie and Carrie and her friend to his place to entertain the women, but after landing there, Carrie ended up with Doug after a long conversation where she realized she really liked him instead of Richie. However, in one episode later in the season, it is portrayed that Carrie had met Doug in high school, which is incongruent with the storyline, and obviously was not something intentional, done by the show's writers.

Carrie's best friend in the show is Kelly Palmer (Merrin Dungey), the wife of Doug's best friend and co-worker, Deacon Palmer (Victor Williams). Carrie attempts to stay fit by going to the gym, tries to eat right, and often attempts to inject some unwanted "culture" into her and Doug's life by going to such things as the opera or Cirque du Soleil. Doug puts up significant resistance to her cultural suggestions, oftentimes lying to her about working late or having some other commitment which precludes him from attending the boring events Carrie suggests. She loves expensive designer clothes and dressing well in the face of their limited incomes, but is otherwise more practical in how they spend their middle-class paycheck, such as buying a new fridge they need, or to pay a bill which is due, unlike Doug who would like to buy frivolous things such as a pet monkey, a wood-fired pizza oven or an enormous big screen TV. Carrie is dedicated to the care of her live-in father, Arthur, and looks out for his health and his best interests in spite of his inconceivably ridiculous schemes (such as inventing a new type of screwdriver, called the Arthur’s head,) his constant yelling, and many of his senseless tirades. This oftentimes collides with Doug's feelings about Arthur who he would just as soon like to see move out and not live with them any longer. She realizes that Doug, in the end, only does it for her and does many things he does not want to do, just to keep her happy. In turn, Carrie uses sex quite frequently as a "reward" for Doug, or as an approach to getting something she wants or needs, and understands Doug's great interest in regular and more frequent sex, as her bargaining chip. As far as having a family, Carrie is on the fence because she feels her career and a paycheck is important, and appears to be afraid of the responsibility. Although she and Doug discuss having kids intermittently as the seasons progress, there is no serious attempt at trying to have a baby and start a family. Some "surprises" crop up where Carrie either thinks she is pregnant or in one instant, is actually pregnant, only to be disappointed by the outcome. Doug on the other hand, is looking forward to having children, and couldn't be happier if Carrie would announce she is pregnant. They make several attempts to try and have a baby, although it is apparent that Carrie's heart isn't truly in it, she is doing it more for Doug, but also she feels she is aging and that it is the right thing to do, as well, timing wise. In one episode, Carrie ridiculously comes up with an agreement to have a child, based on one condition. Her scheme is that while she is driving the car with Doug in the passenger seat, if they make the next green light, she will concede and have a baby. If the light goes red, she will not. As it turns out, the light is green, but she slows the car down significantly so the light goes to red, and no baby is forecast in the Heffernan family. And argument ensues about her slowing down, and they both agree that it was a stupid plan, and then agree to continue to discuss their family in a more responsible way.

At the end of the series, the couple decide to adopt a baby after struggling to conceive a child, having miscarried earlier in the series. In the series finale "China Syndrome", Doug and Carrie decide to split up but eventually reunite after adopting a Chinese baby girl. The same day, Carrie discovers she is pregnant.

Carrie has a caustic personality, and can sometimes be physically abusive (usually toward Doug), and is frequently categorized as "scary" by other characters, particularly by her husband and the family dog walker Holly (Nicole Sullivan). Carrie is a legal secretary throughout the show before being fired along with her boss, Mr. Pruzan. Carrie chooses to pursue a similar line of work at a real estate company, and along with herself, she takes her aggressive working style with her to the new firm. On the outside, Carrie also intimidates staff at many of the neighborhood services she uses, including her nail salon, evidenced by an episode where nail salon staff tell Carrie that her regular nail girl has to trim down her roster because she is working less due to pregnancy. However, in reality the salon nor the girl do not want the demanding and abrasive Carrie back in the shop for her fingernail business any longer. She begins to realize something is wrong, when Holly (the dog walker) walks in off the street and is given an appointment immediately. However, Carrie can demonstrate sensitivity in the face of being enraged, and for feeling that she has been crossed or hard done by in some way. In another episode, it is revealed that Carrie was accepted to Florida State University but her father Arthur never told her, instead hiding her original acceptance letter. While looking for some things that Arthur wants brought to the hospital while he is recovering from a heart attack, Carrie finds the letter in a shoebox containing Arthur's personal effects. The letter was from Florida State University confirming her acceptance to the school, the only university out of many she applied to, which accepted her. Carrie instantly feels she has been wronged, and begins to question whether her life would have been different should she have had a college education. She examines such questions such as whether or not she would have chosen and married Doug, who was a sloppy, overweight, blue-collar package deliveryman. Or knowing that she would not be working as a lowly secretary in the law firm, instead she'd be a law-firm partner, one of the high-powered lawyers with a big salary and huge home, receiving constant accolades from colleagues and judges, and enjoying a more luxurious and sexy lifestyle, enjoying interludes with a bevy of handsome and fit lovers. Carrie, enraged, then accosts Arthur in the hospital demanding an explanation to what he had done, and Arthur explains that her mother had just died and he felt he needed Carrie at home to care for him. So in turn, he hid the letter. Carrie begins to immediately resent her father, but when she realizes that he has had a close call and almost dies in hospital from his heart condition, she has a change of thought, and begins to feel sorry for him. It's at this time, she decides to let the situation go and resolves whether rightly or wrongly, that overall, she is happy with her life, just the way it is.

Although she is a compassionate and sensitive person who at times can feel guilt and remorse, she can be quite selfish. In the episode "Ice Cubed", Carrie tries to make things right with an employee at a store after she accidentally gives her a free iPod and gets subsequently fired. However, in a later episode, she takes advantage of one of Doug's ex-girlfriends who he mistreated by tricking her into sleeping with him, for which currently he feels great remorse and shame. She brazenly then uses this ex-girlfriend (Janeane Garofalo) of Doug to get a 40% discount on one of her favorite stores, Saks, so she can purchase the designer clothes, shoes and purses she desperately wants. Doug becomes incensed with the entire situation and he and Carrie have an intense argument over this, and Doug forces Carrie to reluctantly apologize to Doug's ex-girlfriend, all the while knowing it was the right thing to do.

== Development and impact ==
The character of Carrie was created by David Litt and Michael J. Weithorn. The show was originally created around the character of Doug Heffernan after Kevin James' successful guest appearances on popular sitcom Everybody Loves Raymond. The King of Queens was partly inspired by the classic television sitcom The Honeymooners. Carrie Heffernan is based on the character of Alice Kramden, with similar mannerisms and deadpan expressions. In a recent interview, Weithorn admits that he created the character from a "real person" who worked in his father's law firm in Manhattan. Weithorn would visit his father's office occasionally where he had a crush on a pretty secretary who worked at the firm, and subsequently he learned that her husband was a blue collar worker, which he could not reconcile, based on how beautiful the secretary was, and his adolescent crush on her. Weithorn created the "Carrie Heffernan" character based on the Doug Heffernan character for the show, mirrored on the real life of the secretary in his father's office. Consequently, the character of Carrie worked in a law firm as a secretary, exactly like Weithorn's real life crush.

Originally, the role was almost accepted by Megan Mullally who turned it down at the last minute to take a role in Will & Grace. When Remini's short lived TV series Fired Up was cancelled in February 1998 she was subsequently offered the role of Carrie due to her promising comedic performance.

Carrie Heffernan is a popular character in sitcom history. Examiner.com named her the 9th-most memorable television wife.
