= China Syndrome =

China Syndrome may refer to:

- "China syndrome", a nuclear meltdown scenario so named for the fanciful idea that there would be nothing to stop the meltdown tunneling its way to the other side of the world ("China")
- The China Syndrome, a 1979 film inspired by the scenario
- "China Syndrome" (The King of Queens), the final episode of the television sitcom The King of Queens

== See also ==
- China Crisis
