= The Kinnane Brothers =

American filmmaking collective

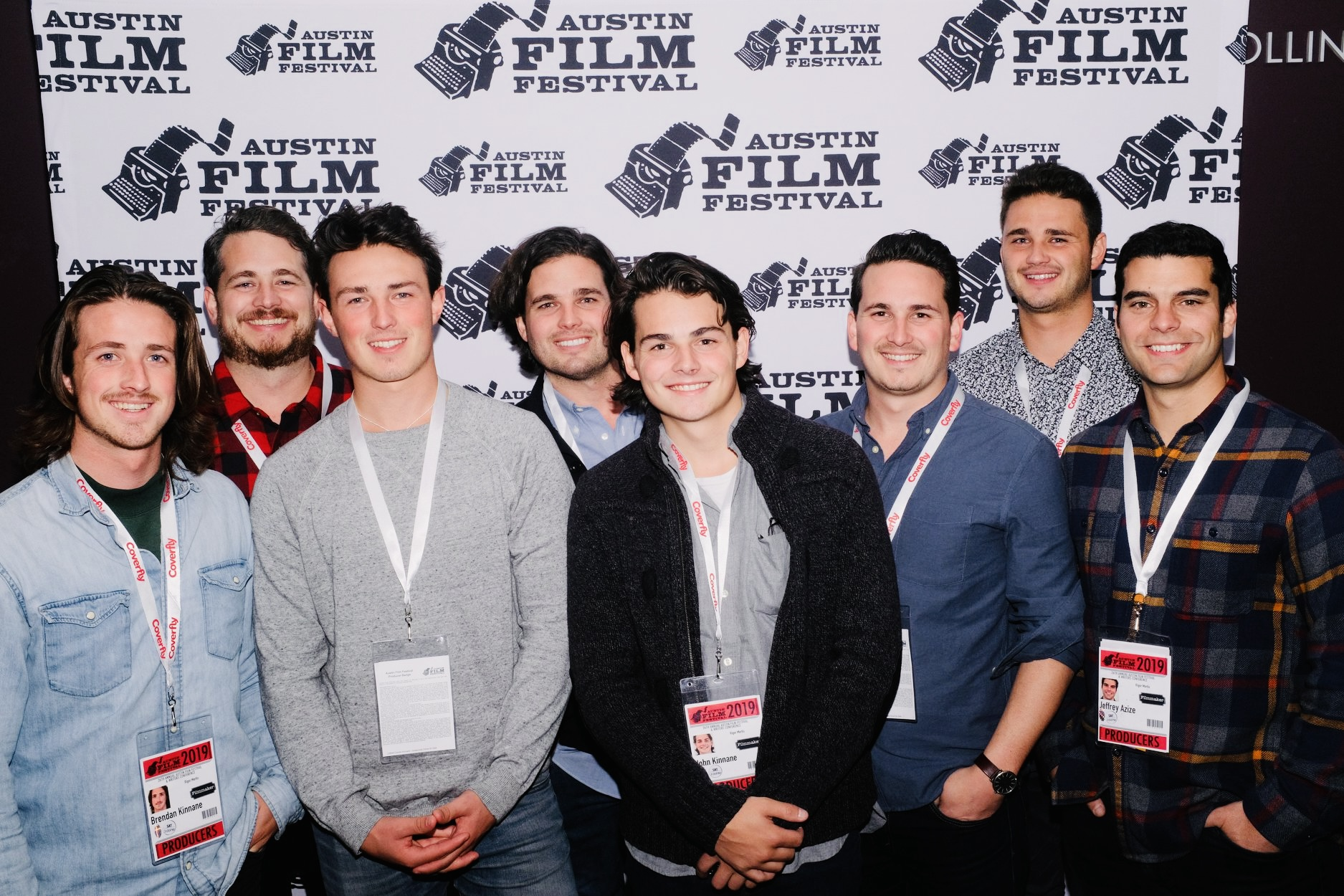
- From left to right: Brendan, Charles, Peter, Wil, John, Daniel, Patrick Kinnane, and Jeffrey Azize at the Austin Film Festival, 2019
- Born: Rhode Island, U.S.
- Occupation: Filmmakers
- Years active: 2017–present
- Notable work: Solo Mio, Home Team, Water Brother: The Sid Abbruzzi Story

The Kinnane Brothers are an American filmmaking collective from Rhode Island, composed of seven brothers—Charles, Daniel, Patrick, Brendan, Peter, John, and William Kinnane—and their brother-in-law, Jeffrey Azize. The group works collectively on directing, writing, producing, and editing films and documentaries. Their credits include Solo Mio (2026), Home Team (2022), and Water Brother: The Sid Abbruzzi Story (2024), as well as a series of short films created with actor Kevin James.

== Early life and background ==
The brothers grew up in Little Compton, Rhode Island. According to The Boston Globe, as children they made videos together on an old VHS camera, a pastime that eventually led to professional filmmaking. In 2017 they launched a family-run film and media company. Coverage has noted their collaborative production approach, with writing, directing, and post-production handled within the family.

== Kevin James collaborations and viral shorts (2020) ==
In 2020 the Kinnane Brothers partnered with Kevin James to produce more than 50 short comedies during the COVID-19 pandemic. One of the most recognized was the Sound Guy series, which featured James digitally inserted into scenes from well-known films. The brothers wrote, directed, filmed, and edited the projects while working in isolation with James. Their collaboration was covered by The Hollywood Reporter, Variety, and No Film School.

== Home Team (2022) ==
In 2022 Charles and Daniel Kinnane directed the Netflix sports comedy Home Team, starring Kevin James and produced by Adam Sandler’s Happy Madison Productions. The film was released on Netflix, where it reached the platform’s Top 10 listings in several regions.

== Water Brother: The Sid Abbruzzi Story (2024) ==
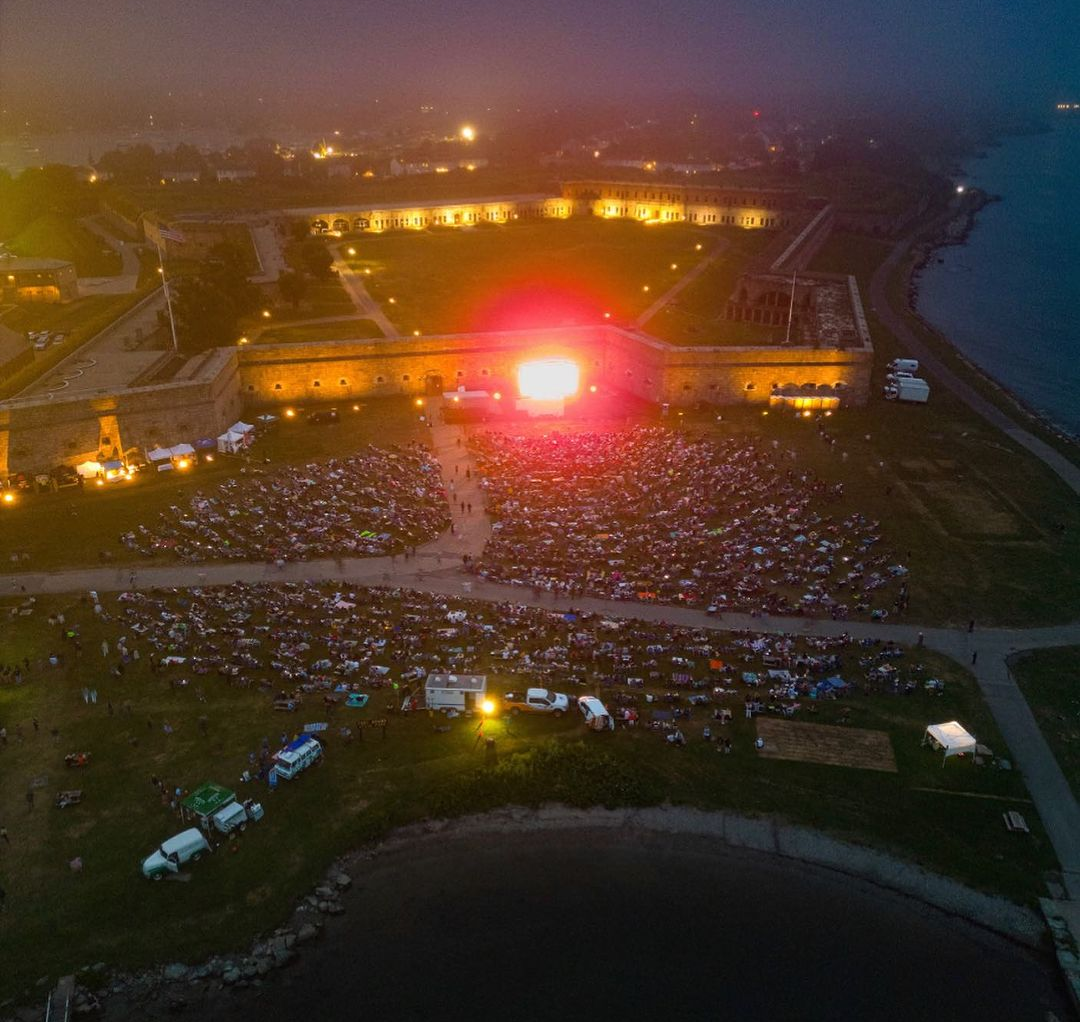
Water Brother premiere at Fort Adams during NewportFILM, 2023.

Water Brother: The Sid Abbruzzi Story (2024) is a documentary directed by the Kinnane Brothers about Sid Abbruzzi, a Rhode Island surfer and skateboarder. The film includes interviews and archival footage featuring figures such as Tony Hawk and Shepard Fairey. It focuses on the closing of Abbruzzi’s Water Brothers Surf & Skate shop and his contributions to surf and skate culture. The documentary premiered at Fort Adams during NewportFILM and later received a limited theatrical release.

== Solo Mio (2026) ==
Solo Mio is directed by Charles and Daniel Kinnane, with a screenplay by John Kinnane, Patrick Kinnane and Kevin James. Peter Kinnane edited the film, Jeffrey Azize, William Kinnane and Brendan Kinnane served as executive producers. Angel Studios distributed it in theaters on February 6, 2026. The film grossed $26 million on a $4 million budget and was positively received by critics.

== Screenplayed ==
In 2017 John Kinnane launched Screenplayed, a digital platform that compares film scripts with their completed scenes. The account is managed by the Kinnane Brothers and has been featured by several studios and distributors. The platform is designed to show how films evolve from the written page to the final screen, offering insight into the filmmaking process.

A connected podcast, Screenplayed Breakdown, interviews prominent filmmakers with the same goal of education.
