= Sandy Wernick =

American film and television producer (1939–2026)

- Born: March 22, 1939; New York City, U.S.
- Died: March 5, 2026 (aged 86); Rancho Mirage, California, U.S.
- Occupations: Film and television producer

Sanford Wernick (March 22, 1939 – March 5, 2026) was an American film and television producer, executive producer and talent manager.

== Life and career ==
Wernick was born in the Bronx, New York, on March 22, 1939. A graduate of New York University and a partner at Brillstein Entertainment Partners, he was a producer for ALF, Happy Gilmore, Def Comedy Jam and The Wedding Singer.

Over the course of his career, Wernick served as the manager for notable individuals, including Lorne Michaels, Tim Herlihy, and Rob Schneider, and he was best known as the longtime manager of Adam Sandler.

The 2017 film Sandy Wexler starred Sandler in a satirical homage to Wernick. Wernick also acted in the film as Peter Marvelle.

Wernick died in Rancho Mirage, California, on March 5, 2026, at the age of 86.
