= Sandy Wexler =

2017 film by Steven Brill

- Release poster
- Directed by: Steven Brill
- Written by: Dan Bulla; Paul Sado; Adam Sandler
- Produced by: Adam Sandler; Allen Covert; Ted Sarandos
- Starring: Adam Sandler; Jennifer Hudson; Kevin James; Terry Crews; Rob Schneider; Colin Quinn; Lamorne Morris
- Cinematography: Dean Semler
- Edited by: Tom Costain
- Music by: Rupert Gregson-Williams
- Production company: Happy Madison Productions
- Distributed by: Netflix
- Release dates: April 7, 2017 (Los Angeles); April 14, 2017 (United States)
- Running time: 131 minutes
- Country: United States
- Language: English
- Budget: $24.3 million

Sandy Wexler is a 2017 American comedy film directed by Steve Brill and written by Dan Bulla, Paul Sado and Adam Sandler. The film stars Sandler, Jennifer Hudson, Kevin James, Terry Crews, Rob Schneider, Colin Quinn, and Lamorne Morris, and follows a talent manager in 1990s Hollywood. It also featured Richard Lewis in his final film acting role before his death in 2024. The film was released on Netflix on April 14, 2017.

== Plot ==
In 1994, Sandy Wexler is a struggling talent manager in Los Angeles. He has a rather eccentric personality and often tells lies to sound more important than he really is, resulting in his clients never finding success except for his first, a man named Alfred. His current clientele include Ted Rafferty, a ventriloquist, Kevin Connors, a comedian, Amy Baskin, an actress, Gary Rodgers, a daredevil, and Bobby Barnes, a wrestler.

Sandy lives in the cabana of Firuz, a Jewish-Iranian, who needs him to live there for legal reasons. However, he is confined to a small area of the estate, and watched remotely via surveillance cameras.

While at Six Flags, Sandy sees a young woman, Courtney Clarke, performing in a stage show. Immediately entranced by both her voice and her beauty, he convinces her that he can make her a star once he meets her dad, an Alaskan prison guard. Later he explains to her that as a manager he always has to keep a professional distance with his clients. He cites his first client as his cautionary tale, saying Alfred had been his best friend but dumped him and later became huge.

Sandy gets Courtney into a studio to record her first single, which becomes a hit through Capitol Records. They record several singles that become hits, but his antics continue to cause her trouble. Believing she has a stalker, Courtney calls him over. Poking outside her home, he discovers it was only a racoon.

When she invites him in to clean up, Sandy discovers that rapper Bling is her boyfriend. Bling has got her a publicist and convinces Sandy that his presence is a hindrance to Courtney's potential fame, so he resigns as her manager.

Miserable, Sandy cries for hours. Not able to escape reminders of Courtney, which are everywhere as she becomes a star, he goes to his neighbor Cindy's. She's been throwing herself at him for ages, but when the moment comes he can't, as her bed-ridden stroke-stricken husband is watching.

While Sandy continues to struggle with both his feelings for Courtney and his clients, she grows more and more famous, eventually winning a Grammy. Bobby soon sees success when Sandy helps him become champ, while Courtney, feeling unsatisfied with her fame, spirals into drinking and a string of failed relationships.

Contacting Sandy as she's wasted, Courtney seeks comfort with him, but he is a gentleman and doesn't take advantage of her. The next day, they pal around together at a driving range then, in the evening, they watch his wrestler client Bobby win a championship match.

That night, sitting by the pool, Courtney marvels at how selfless Sandy is, always putting others first. Trying to get him to admit his feelings, she half gives up and they have a one night stand before she flies to NYC to do a video with Lenny Kravitz.

Depressed by Courtney's decision, Sandy is more distracted than ever, which costs him all his clients except Ted. He accompanies him with negotiations at a TV network to take over a program whose clown host just committed suicide. As soon as a deal is reached, Sandy is rushed to the hospital for a mild heart attack.

Sandy wakes in a luxurious hospital room, thanks to Courtney. She tells him that she's quitting the business and leaving to get married in Seattle.

While back at Six Flags, he meets Alfred, finally revealed to be Weird Al Yankovic. Al convinces Sandy to stop telling people what he thinks they want to hear and, instead, tell them the truth. To this end, Sandy enlists many of his contacts, calling in favors.

Sandy has his landlord bring Courtney to Griffith Observatory, where he admits his feelings to her, which she reciprocates, and they're married in a ceremony officiated by one of Ted's puppets. Sandy's newfound honesty also gets him back his clients as well as many new ones. After twenty years, Courtney and Sandy are married for real.

== Cast ==
- Adam Sandler as Sandy Wexler
- Jennifer Hudson as Courtney Clarke
- Kevin James as Ted Rafferty
- Terry Crews as "Bedtime" Bobby Barnes
- Shad Gaspard as "Bedtime" Bobby Barnes (in-ring)
- Rob Schneider as Firuz
- Colin Quinn as Kevin Connors
- Nick Swardson as Gary Rodgers
- Lamorne Morris as Bling
- Arsenio Hall as himself
- Aaron Neville as Willy Clarke
- Jane Seymour as Cindy Marvelle
- Sandy Wernick as Peter Marvelle
- Wayne Federman as Eric Lamonsoff
- Jackie Sandler as Amy Baskin
- Luis Guzmán as Oscar
- Rob Reiner as Marty Markowitz
- Chris Elliott as Mr. Buttons
- Ido Mosseri as Yuri
- Milo Ventimiglia as Barry Bubatzi
- Eugenio Derbez as Ramiro Alejandro
- Jessica Lowe as Ms. Gideon
- Allen Covert as Gurvy
- Jonathan Loughran as Trucker Jon
- Kate Micucci as Nurse Trisha
- Jared Sandler as Jared

Cameo roles include Clay Aiken, Jewel, Darius Rucker, Jason Priestley, Gary Dell'Abate, Arsenio Hall, Quincy Jones, Judd Apatow, Janeane Garofalo, Pauly Shore, Kevin Nealon, Lorne Michaels, Dana Carvey, Chris Rock, David Spade, George Wendt, Penn Jillette, Henry Winkler, Tony Orlando, Al B. Sure!, Brian McKnight, Vanilla Ice, Jimmy Kimmel, Conan O'Brien, Louie Anderson, "Weird Al" Yankovic, Kenneth "Babyface" Edmonds, Mason "Ma$e" Betha, Jay Leno, Lisa Loeb, Jon Lovitz, Richard Lewis, Budd Friedman and his wife Alix Friedman.

Mike Judge makes a vocal cameo as Beavis and Butt-Head during the end credits. Professional wrestlers Rikishi and David Otunga have brief roles in the film.

== Production ==
On July 20, 2016, Jennifer Hudson joined the cast of the film, and on July 26, 2016, Kevin James, Terry Crews, Rob Schneider, Colin Quinn, Nick Swardson, Lamorne Morris and Arsenio Hall joined as well. Principal photography began on August 2, 2016.

The Wexler character is a satirical homage to Sandler's real-life manager Sandy Wernick.

== Release ==
The film was released worldwide on Netflix on April 14, 2017.

=== Critical response ===
On Rotten Tomatoes, Sandy Wexler has an approval rating of 27% based on 22 reviews, with an average rating of 4.11/10. The site's critical consensus reads, "Sandy Wexler marks a mild improvement from the Adam Sandler vehicles immediately preceding it – which in no way serves as an endorsement for non-hardcore fans." On Metacritic, the film has a weighted average score 40 out of 100, based on 8 critics, indicating "mixed or average reviews".

Peter Debruge of Variety called the film "sloppy" and is critical of the 131 minute runtime. Although he appreciates the concept of the film as a comedy roast, Debruge complains that the film is not funny enough. In his review of Sandy Wexler, film critic Brian Tallerico wrote that the film "sucks" and that "Brill and Sandler never wrote a joke that they didn’t think was worth repeating until you were sick of it."

Some critics have discussed the Jewish angle of the film, which portrays a relationship between a Jewish manager and a black performer.
