= Doug Heffernan =

Character in the sitcom The King of Queens

- The King of Queens character
- First appearance: "Pilot" (episode 1.01) (1998)
- Last appearance: Promos for Kevin Can Wait (2016)
- Created by: David Litt
- Portrayed by: Kevin James

In-universe information
- Gender: Male
- Occupation: IPS driver
- Family: Joe Heffernan (father); Janet Heffernan (mother); Stephanie Heffernan (sister); Danny Heffernan (cousin); Stu Heffernan (uncle); Trudy Carlson-Heffernan (aunt); Sheila Heffernan-Rednester (aunt); Hank Rednester (uncle)
- Spouse: Carrie Heffernan (wife)
- Children: Ming-Mei Heffernan (adopted); Baby Boy Heffernan (biological)
- Relatives: Arthur Spooner (father-in-law)

Douglas Steven "Doug" Heffernan is a fictional character and the protagonist of the American sitcom The King of Queens. He is portrayed by Kevin James, whose stand-up comedy background inspired the comedic style of the show. Doug, an often immature 'average Joe', lives in Rego Park, Queens, with his wife Carrie Heffernan (Leah Remini) and his father-in-law Arthur Spooner (Jerry Stiller). The character has also appeared in Everybody Loves Raymond, Becker, and Cosby.

Doug is a delivery driver for the International Parcel Service (a fictionalized version of United Parcel Service), a job he acquired by pretending to work there after lying to Carrie (his then-girlfriend) about having a job.

== Character Background ==
Doug was born on February 9, 1965, in Montreal, while his mother Janet (Jenny O'Hara) and father Joe (Dakin Matthews) were attending a friend's wedding there. His parents told him that he was born in New York City and he discovers the truth as an adult, in the episode "Dog Shelter". He has a sister, a physical education teacher named Stephanie (Ricki Lake).

Doug's father owned a small hardware store in Queens, and his mother was a homemaker. The Heffernans were Catholic, but Doug lapses after moving out. He lived with his parents until he was 27, when he moved into his friend Richie's apartment. Doug's father, Joe, wanted Doug to take over the hardware store when he came of age, but Doug showed little interest in this venture.

He was an overweight child and was sent to "fat camp" by his parents. Doug's weight is frequently a point of contention between himself and his wife, with Carrie encouraging him to eat healthier, but Doug is steadfast in his enjoyment of fried foods and snacks. Carrie's domineering personality in contrast to the far more easygoing Doug is another frequent subject of argument, with Doug preferring to relax and goof around with his buddies after work. He has also been known to secretly defy her demands (about clothing and cologne, for example), wanting his life with Carrie to have as few restrictions as possible.

Doug is an avid sports fan, supporting the New York Mets, New York Jets, New York Knicks, and New York Rangers. He proposes to Carrie at a Jets game. On Christmas one year, when he is given a Miami Dolphins Christmas ornament, Doug openly doesn't like the gift because both the Jets and Dolphins play in the AFC East. (Despite the Jets-Patriots rivalry becoming more intense during the show's run than the Dolphins-Jets rivalry, it was never mentioned on the show; however, the Monday Night Miracle did take place during the show's third season.) James is a fan of the Mets in real life; he named his daughter Shea Joelle after the then-home of the Mets, Shea Stadium.

Doug attended St. Gregory's High School in Queens, where he befriended Spence Olchin; he also went to school with his cousin Danny. Doug played high school football was a star player and starting fullback. He was very popular in school and thinks of high school as the best years of his life. Doug never liked bullies in high school, unlike the other jocks, which also made him well-liked. In the episode "Hi, School", Doug says to Carrie during an argument, "Oh, I see what's going on; you're mad because I rocked in high school and you didn't." Carrie was an unpleasant and rebellious teenager in high school, while Doug would often avoid schoolwork and try hard to be liked in high school. After graduation, he went to Nassau Community College on Long Island, but dropped out after eight days. He tried out for the Nassau County Rebels, a semi-professional football team, but ultimately quit.

He later acquired a job as a bouncer at a bar. Around this time, his friend Richie, a firefighter for the New York City Fire Department, introduced him to his future wife, Carrie Spooner. While dating Carrie, Doug inadvertently landed his final and longest-standing job as a truck driver for the fictional International Parcel Service (IPS).

Doug's trademark phrase is "Shutty!" as a means of telling people to "shut up."

== Marriage ==
Early in the show, it is referenced that Doug and Carrie have known each other since junior high. That story was retconned, and the new plot is that Doug and his friend Richie met Carrie at a club, then went on a double date that did not go well, until the end. Doug first meets Carrie's father, Arthur (Jerry Stiller), at a Thanksgiving dinner that went wrong. Doug is nearly scared away by Arthur, who disapproves of the relationship, but later in this episode, he and Carrie declare their love for one another.

Doug and Carrie got engaged at a Jets game and married in 1995, before the start of the series. Initially, they live with Arthur while searching for a house. After they find a house, Arthur's wife dies, his home burns down, and he is forced to move in with them.

In Season 6, the couple decides to renew their vows. The idea came up during a dinner date, where Doug is inspired to declare his love to his wife. Carrie is touched by this and suggests that they should renew their vows. However, the couple's initial enthusiasm for renewing their vows quickly dwindles. Planning the wedding becomes much more troublesome than they expected. Through mutual agreement, they call off the wedding and let their friends and relatives know of the cancellation; Doug's mother worries about problems in her son's marriage. Doug and Carrie's frustrations grow as rumours of their marriage complications spread. Ultimately, they decide that the ceremony will go ahead, and despite further issues (finding it difficult to get a chimp to serve as Doug's best man), Doug and Carrie renew their wedding vows.

At the end of the series, Doug and Carrie adopt a baby girl from China. On the same day, Carrie realizes that she is pregnant.

== Friends ==
Doug's best friend is fellow IPS driver Deacon Palmer (Victor Williams), who is married to Kelly (Merrin Dungey), Carrie's best friend. His other friends include his lifelong friend and subway booth worker Spence Olchin (Patton Oswalt), a firefighter named Richie Ianucchi (Larry Romano), his cousin Danny (Gary Valentine), dog walker Holly (Nicole Sullivan), and next-door neighbor and bodybuilder Lou Ferrigno (playing himself). Another friend of Doug's, Ray Barone (Ray Romano), appears as a guest on several episodes of the show; Doug has also appeared on several episodes of Romano's show, Everybody Loves Raymond, as well as other New York-based CBS shows such as Cosby and Becker.

== After King of Queens ==
In 2016, Doug resurfaced in several television spots for a new CBS sitcom starring Kevin James called Kevin Can Wait. In these ads, he meets up with James and they have a short banter about the upcoming sitcom. In one ad, he suggests portraying a next-door neighbor to James' new character. In another, while watching television and bringing up the fact that King of Queens is currently in reruns, he tempts James (who is about to eat a plate of carrot sticks) with a large bucket of fried chicken, which the actor eats.
