= Home Team (2022 film) =

2022 American film by Charles and Daniel Kinnane

- Release poster
- Directed by: Charles Kinnane; Daniel Kinnane
- Written by: Chris Titone; Keith Blum
- Produced by: Adam Sandler; Kevin Grady; Allen Covert; Kevin James; Jeff Lowell; Jeff Sussman
- Starring: Kevin James; Taylor Lautner; Rob Schneider; Jackie Sandler; Tait Blum
- Cinematography: Seamus Tierney
- Edited by: Tom Costain; Brian Robinson; Scott Hill
- Music by: Rupert Gregson-Williams
- Production companies: Happy Madison Productions; Hey Eddie Productions
- Distributed by: Netflix
- Release date: January 28, 2022
- Running time: 95 minutes
- Country: United States
- Language: English
- Budget: $44.6 million

Home Team is a 2022 American sports comedy-drama film directed by Charles Kinnane and Daniel Kinnane (in their feature length directorial debuts), written by Chris Titone and Keith Blum, and starring Kevin James in the lead role, Taylor Lautner, Rob Schneider, Jackie Sandler, and Tait Blum. Inspired by actual events, the film tells the story of New Orleans Saints head coach Sean Payton who coached his 12-year-old son's football team during his one-year suspension from the NFL.

Home Team was produced by Adam Sandler's Happy Madison Productions and James's Hey Eddie Productions, and filmed in New Orleans from May to June 2021. It was released on January 28, 2022, by Netflix.

== Plot ==
Two years after the New Orleans Saints won Super Bowl XLIV, head coach Sean Payton is involved in the Bountygate scandal and suspended from the NFL for one year. While he's awaiting the results of his appeal, he returns to his hometown, Argyle, Texas, to reconnect with his 12-year-old son Connor.

Not knowing how long he'll stay, Sean checks into a local hotel for 5 days and heads to his old middle school, Liberty Christian. Showing up to the football team's game unannounced, his ex-wife Beth and her new husband Jaime call him over.

Connor wonders why his father has come and Sean explains he just wants to get to know him. Beth and Jaime invite him to their barbecue the next afternoon. Sean introduces himself to coach Troy. At the BBQ, Connor's teammate in the Argyle Warriors friends are friendly, but he remains distant.

Watching the practices, Sean occasionally shouts out suggestions to Connor and others take notice. Known around town, other parents encourage him to help out with their kids as he sees fit. At the next game as he sees a way to help the team, Sean pops down and gives advice to Coach Troy, securing the team's first touchdown of the season.

Troy hunts down Sean that evening, convincing him to join them as the team's offensive coordinator. At the first game after the kids have the new playbook it's obvious they don't get it, so he shows them using nacho ingredients as props. Soon, the Warriors are winning every game.

However, facing the state champs the Porcupines, the Warriors are intimidated. The aggressive, much larger players cream them. Although dejected, they are reminded that they wouldn't have to play them again until the final. They go on to win all of their following matches, their semi-final is won in heavy rain as the kids projectile vomit, caused by natural energy wraps provided by Jaime.

In the final, Sean runs their two best players in both offense and defense in the first half, making them exhausted, but keeping the lead. Finally, in the last quarter, he puts the two benched defensive players back in and has their kicker Harlan, who hasn't scored one all season, to go for the tie. He misses, but the team rejoices as he knocks out the scoreboard.

Heading back to New Orleans, before Sean leaves he organizes Connor's future visit to see him and the team. Back in his office, Sean proudly places the second-place middle school trophy next to his Super Bowl one as a janitor named Lionel enters his office.

== Cast ==
- Kevin James as Sean Payton, the coach of the New Orleans Saints.
- Taylor Lautner as Troy Lambert, the coach of the Argyle Warriors who is based on Brenan Hardy.
- Jackie Sandler as Beth, Sean's ex-wife who is based on Sean's real-life wife Beth Shuey.
- Rob Schneider as Jamie, a gentle metaphysical man and Beth's current husband.
- Tait Blum as Connor Payton, the son of Sean Payton and Beth and the stepson of Jamie.
- Maxwell Simkins as Paulie, a member of the Argyle Warriors that has a large focus on food.
- Chloe Fineman as Emily, an intern.
- Jacob Perez as Marcos, one of the Argyle Warriors' best players.
- Bryant Tardy as Dennis, a member of the Argyle Warriors who plays defense.
- Manny Magnus as Harlan, the smallest of the Argyle Warriors who serves as their kicker.
- Liam Kyle as Nate
- Christopher Farrar as Jason
- Merek Mastrov as Brian, the quarterback of the Argyle Warriors.
- Isaiah Mustafa as Porcupine Coach
- Christopher Titone as Will
- Ashley D. Kelley as Cindy
- Lavell Crawford as Gus, a bus driver for the Argyle Warriors.
- Allen Covert as Referee Covert
- Anthony L. Fernandez as Calvin
- Jared Sandler as Eric, a hotel clerk.
- Sunny Sandler as Brooke
- Bill Cowher as himself
- John Farley as Championship Game Referee
- Dan Patrick as himself
- Jim Nantz as himself
- Sean Payton as Lionel, a janitor.

== Production ==
The film began principal photography on May 10, 2021, and ended on June 6, 2021, in New Orleans. On May 18, 2021, it was reported that Taylor Lautner, Rob Schneider, Jackie Sandler, Gary Valentine, Tait Blum, Maxwell Simkins, Jacob Perez, Bryant Tardy, Manny Magnus, Liam Kyle, Christopher Farrar, Merek Mastrov, Isaiah Mustafa, Christopher Titone, Ashley D. Kelley, Lavell Crawford, Allen Covert, Anthony L. Fernandez, and Jared Sandler joined the cast. The film was directed by Charles Kinnane and Daniel Kinnane, written by Chris Titone and Keith Blum, and produced by Happy Madison Productions and Hey Eddie Productions.

== Release ==
The film was released on January 28, 2022, on Netflix.

== Reception ==
On the review aggregator website Rotten Tomatoes, 21% of 28 critics' reviews are positive, with an average rating of 4/10. Metacritic, which uses a weighted average, assigned the film a score of 23 out of 100, based on 6 critics, indicating "generally unfavorable" reviews.
