= Solo Mio =

2026 American romantic comedy film

- Theatrical release poster
- Directed by: Chuck Kinnane; Dan Kinnane
- Written by: John Kinnane; Patrick Kinnane; Kevin James
- Produced by: Mark Fasano; Jeffrey Greenstein
- Starring: Kevin James; Nicole Grimaudo; Alyson Hannigan; Jonathan Roumie; Julee Cerda; Julie Ann Emery; Andrea Bocelli; Kim Coates
- Cinematography: Jared Fadel
- Edited by: Pete Kinnane
- Music by: Joy Ngiaw
- Production companies: A Higher Standard; Kinnane Brothers; Nickel City Pictures
- Distributed by: Angel Studios
- Release dates: January 20, 2026 (Coconut Grove Cinépolis); February 6, 2026 (United States)
- Running time: 96 minutes
- Country: United States
- Language: English
- Budget: $4 million
- Box office: $26.4 million

Solo Mio is a 2026 American romantic comedy drama film directed by Chuck Kinnane and Dan Kinnane, written by Patrick Kinnane, John Kinnane and Kevin James. The film stars James as Matt Taylor, who travels to Rome for his wedding only to be left at the altar by his fiancée. Their honeymoon package was prepaid so he decides to take it by himself, and encounters new friends in other married couples on the same honeymoon package (played by Kim Coates, Jonathan Roumie, Alyson Hannigan, and Julee Cerda) and an intriguing cafe owner played by Nicole Grimaudo. Andrea Bocelli plays a supporting role in his first appearance in a fictional feature-length film. The film was shot on location in Rome and Tuscany.

It was released by Angel Studios on February 6, 2026. It received positive reviews from critics and was a box office success, grossing $26.4 million against a production budget of $4 million.

== Plot ==
Matt Taylor is an American schoolteacher who elaborately plans and executes a proposal and wedding for Italy. He then is left devastated when his fiancée Heather abandons him at the altar, leaving behind a note explaining that she is not ready for marriage. Unable to find her and told nothing is refundable, Matt decides to continue with the activities planned for their honeymoon, attending them alone.

Along the way, Matt is comforted by two married couples. Julian & Megan have divorced and remarried each other for the third time. And Neil & Donna, a psychotherapist and a physical therapist confide that their own relationship is far from perfect.

While dining at a local café, Matt meets the charming owner Gia. She first recovers his wallet from a group of mischievous preteens, then offers to show him around the city. The two quickly form a connection, though Matt avoids revealing the true reason for his presence in Italy. As their bond deepens, Gia takes him and his new friends to a villa in the countryside, where he learns she is the niece of the renowned Italian singer Andrea Bocelli, who once collaborated with Matt's favorite artist, Ed Sheeran.

Matt bonds with Gia's family and she asks him to stay in Italy awhile longer. Just as Gia leans in to kiss him, Matt confesses that he was meant to be married only days earlier and shows her Heather's note. Shocked and upset at the sight of the note, Gia walks away.

Disillusioned, Matt prepares to leave Italy. However, he unexpectedly encounters Heather in his hotel lobby. She apologizes for leaving him and explains that prior to the wedding, she had met Gia. The two discussed Heather's unhappiness, and Gia (who had not yet met Matt) counseled Heather and helped her write the note to him.

Matt and Heather console each other but decide to move on without each other. Realizing he must move forward, he sells the engagement ring to buy a motorcycle and returns to Gia's café. After telling her that he understands why Gia helped Heather write the note, Matt invites her to join him at an Ed Sheeran concert, which she accepts.

Mid-credits scenes show Matt and Gia, after an indeterminate amount of time, marrying in Italy with both married couples who helped Matt in attendance, both with new milestones of their own to celebrate during the ceremony.

== Cast ==
- Kevin James as Matt Taylor
- Alyson Hannigan as Meghan
- Nicole Grimaudo as Gia
- Kim Coates as Julian
- Jonathan Roumie as Neil
- Julee Cerda as Donna
- Julie Ann Emery as Heather
- Caterina Silva as Claudia
- Alessandro Carbonara as Marcello
- Andrea Bocelli appears as a fictional version of himself.
- Ed Sheeran appears in this film as himself.

== Production ==
The script was developed and written by the Kinnane brothers and James, whose partnership had begun years prior when the brothers produced short films for James' YouTube channel. The idea for the plot was born from a conversation in which the producers asked James where he would shoot his next film if he could pick anywhere in the world. James responded with Rome. One of the Kinnane brothers came up with a romantic comedy about a man going on his honeymoon alone and decided Rome would be the perfect setting. The film was announced in May 2024.

During casting, the filmmakers said they passed over better known actresses in favor of Grimaudo because of the chemistry she and James showed on a Zoom call with each other.

Andrea Bocelli played a supporting role as a dramatized version of himself, in his first appearance in a fictional feature film. Bocelli's appearance was secured after one of the producers reached out to the Bocelli family and James helped with a fundraiser Bocelli was holding. Bocelli actually owns the Tuscan villa portrayed in the film, and Bocelli's wife and daughter appear as members of Gia's family. The scenes with Bocelli were filmed in a single day.

It was filmed on location in Rome with an Italian crew. Joy Ngiaw signed on as the film's composer.

In May 2025, Angel Studios acquired the distribution rights to the film and set a theatrical release date of February 2026.

=== Marketing ===
Co-writers John Kinnane and Patrick Kinnane conceived the idea of launching social media accounts for Kevin James's character, Matt Taylor, and having James post in character for months before the release of the film's first trailer. In October 2025, accounts on TikTok and Instagram under the handle "@thisismatttaylor" began posting videos of James as Taylor, showing his art classes, students, personal life, proposal, and marriage countdown.

At the time, many online users were unaware of the film's production, leading to speculation over whether James was promoting a movie or whether Matt Taylor was truly an art teacher who closely resembled him. The accounts later reached approximately 584,000 followers on Instagram and 1.1 million followers on TikTok.

On February 8, 2026, James appeared in character as Matt Taylor at Super Bowl LX, expanding the online persona into a public appearance that drew widespread attention on social media. According to marketing materials published by Influenceable and Angel Studios, the campaign generated more than 1 billion earned media impressions and 293 million direct impressions within 96 hours surrounding the Super Bowl rollout.

== Music ==
The soundtrack to Solo Mio was composed by Joy Ngiaw, containing 15 tracks. Bocelli sings Nessun dorma from Giacomo Puccini's Turandot with James in the film.

Other songs include Perfect Symphony, which is another duet by Bocelli and Ed Sheeran, and Sheeran's Photograph.

== Release ==
Solo Mio premiered at the Coconut Grove Cinépolis in Miami on January 20, 2026. It was released to theaters in the United States on February 6, 2026.

== Reception ==
=== Box office ===
Solo Mio grossed $25.7 million in the United States and Canada, and $681,693 in other territories, for a worldwide total of $26.4 million.

The film finished in the top five at the box office in its opening weekend

=== Critical response ===
On the review aggregator website Rotten Tomatoes, 82% of 55 critics' reviews are positive, with an average rating of 6/10. The website's consensus reads: "Leveraging Kevin James' genial star power and gorgeous scenery from Rome for a disarmingly sweet take on recovering from heartbreak, Solo Mio is a breezily enjoyable getaway." Metacritic, which uses a weighted average, assigned the film a score of 48 out of 100, based on eight critics, indicating "mixed or average" reviews. Audiences polled by CinemaScore gave the film an average grade of "A-" on an A+ to F scale.

Armond White of the National Review characterized the movie as an unusual romantic comedy that resonates particularly with male audiences, framing it as a “rom-com for men.” He highlighted Kevin James’ performance and relatability in a role that emphasizes emotional vulnerability and the experience of heartbreak. White suggested the film's approach — focusing on personal growth and connection rather than typical romantic comedy tropes — sets it apart within the genre and offers an appealing alternative for viewers who may not usually gravitate toward traditional rom-coms.
