= The King of Queens =

American television sitcom (1998–2007)

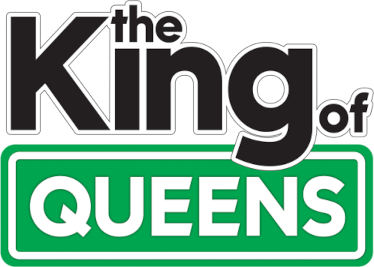
- Genre: Sitcom
- Created by: Michael J. Weithorn; David Litt
- Showrunner: Michael J. Weithorn
- Directed by: Rob Schiller; Various
- Starring: Kevin James; Leah Remini; Patton Oswalt; Larry Romano; Victor Williams; Jerry Stiller; Gary Valentine; Nicole Sullivan
- Opening theme: "Baby All My Life I Will Be Driving Home to You" by Billy Vera and the Beaters (seasons 2–9)
- Ending theme: "Baby All My Life I Will Be Driving Home to You" (instrumental) (season 2)
- Composers: Andrew Gross (seasons 1–2); Jonathan Wolff & Rich Ragsdale (season 2); Kurt Farquhar (seasons 3–9)
- Country of origin: United States
- Original language: English
- No. of seasons: 9
- No. of episodes: 207 (list of episodes)

Production
- Executive producers: Michael J. Weithorn; David Litt; Tony Sheehan; Kevin James; Jeff Sussman; David Bickel; Ilana Wernick; Chris Downey; Rock Reuben; Rob Schiller
- Producers: Annette Sahakian Davis; Jim Kukucka
- Cinematography: Wayne Kennan; Lennie T. Evans; Jim Roberson
- Editor: John Doutt
- Camera setup: Multi-camera
- Running time: 21–22 minutes
- Production companies: Hanley Productions; CBS Paramount Television (Note: Credited as CBS Productions (1998–2007; seasons 1–9)); Sony Pictures Television (Note: Credited as Columbia TriStar Television (1998–2001; seasons 1–4) and Columbia TriStar Domestic Television (2001–2002; seasons 4–5))

Original release
- Network: CBS
- Release: September 21, 1998 – May 14, 2007

Related
- Everybody Loves Raymond; The Young and the Restless

The King of Queens is an American television sitcom that ran on CBS from September 21, 1998, to May 14, 2007, with a total of 207 half-hour episodes spanning nine seasons. The series was created by Michael J. Weithorn and David Litt, who also served as executive producers, and stars Kevin James and Leah Remini as Doug and Carrie Heffernan, a working-class couple living in Rego Park. All episodes were filmed in front of a live studio audience.

The King of Queens was produced by Hanley Productions and CBS Productions (1998–2007)/CBS Paramount Television (2007), in association with Columbia TriStar Television (1998–2002), and Sony Pictures Television (2002–07). It was filmed at Sony Pictures Studios in Culver City, California. The ninth and final season concluded with a double-length series finale in 2007. James and Remini reunited in the 2016 television sitcom Kevin Can Wait, which ended on May 7, 2018.

== Plot ==
Doug (Kevin James) and Carrie Heffernan (Leah Remini) are a middle-class couple living at the fictional 3121 Aberdeen Street in the Rego Park area of Queens, New York, along with Carrie's widowed father, Arthur Spooner (Jerry Stiller). Doug works for the fictional International Parcel Service (IPS) as a delivery driver, while Carrie works as a legal secretary in Manhattan. Their lives are plagued by the demands of Arthur; so much so that they eventually hire Holly, a professional dog walker, to spend time with him as she walks dogs in the park. Doug's constant deceit and schemes through various situations leave him humiliated as his plans backfire.

Also featured on the show are Doug's friends Deacon Palmer (Victor Williams), Spence Olchin (Patton Oswalt), and Richie Iannucci (Larry Romano), as well as Doug's cousin Danny Heffernan (played by James' real-life brother Gary Valentine). Deacon's wife Kelly (Merrin Dungey) is Carrie's best friend, having met through the relationship her husband has with Doug.

Most scenes take place in the Heffernans' home, but other common locations include Doug and Carrie's workplaces, the restaurant/pub "Coopers", and the residences of friends and family. While locations seen during the opening montage were filmed in areas around New York including the Empire State building, the Statue of Liberty and Sbarro Pizza, the series was filmed in California.

The series begins after Doug and Carrie have been married for 3 years, and how they met is somewhat unclear due to continuity issues. In one flashback episode, "Meet By-Product", Doug meets Carrie while he is a bouncer at a nightclub that Carrie attends. However, in another episode, "Road Rayge", Carrie reflects on a song that she says Doug asked her to dance to when they were in junior high school.

== Characters ==
=== Main ===
Main cast from left to right: Stiller, James, Remini.

- Doug Heffernan (played by Kevin James) is an average parcel delivery man working for International Parcel Service (IPS). Born on February 9, 1965, in Montreal, Canada (his Canadian origin was unbeknownst to him until the season 5 episode "Dog Shelter"), he has a cheeky personality and never hesitates to protest his grievances vocally. Some of his problems are fueled by his love of food. These basic desires sometimes cause him to think of selfish, dangerous schemes in order to get what he wants, although they usually fall through in the end, causing constant arguments between Doug and Carrie. Doug's tendency to give in to his temptations, despite promising Carrie otherwise, is another common cause of conflict. He generally enjoys the simple pleasures of watching sports and playing poker with his friends.
- Carrie Heffernan, née "Simone Spooner" (played by Leah Remini), is Doug's sardonic wife. She has a fiery temper and occasionally lashes out at people, mainly Doug. She has been characterized as scary by Holly and Doug, particularly when she is annoyed. During a flashback, Carrie concludes that she is happier when others are miserable. She never finished college and is employed as a legal secretary. Her constant attempts to make her relationship with Doug more romantic and loving cause Doug anxiety, as he prefers a simple life with as few restrictions as possible. The more impulsive and broad-minded of the couple, Carrie often pushes Doug to make more of himself and improve his outlook, but she is generally just as mean-spirited as he is. Although Carrie mocks Doug for his careless behavior, she has proven to be careless as well at times, with little patience for others' problems or tolerance for their quirks. Carrie's best friend is Deacon's wife, Kelly Palmer.
- Arthur Spooner (played by Jerry Stiller) is Carrie's widowed father, who has been married three times. His fourth marriage is to Spence's mother (played by Anne Meara, Stiller's real-life wife) during the final episode of the final season, which ends shortly after in the same episode. Arthur is the classic oddball of the family. He lives in the basement of the Heffernan house because he accidentally set fire to his own uninsured home, burning it to the ground in the pilot episode. Very volatile, Arthur is mostly known for his incoherent, irascible outbursts and on rare occasion, offering up lucid thoughts and perspectives. He tells a lot of questionable stories of what he claims he has been through in his past, although his claim of having been a television and film actor for a time in years past turns out to be true. Arthur regularly causes chaos in the Heffernan household and gets on Doug's and Carrie's nerves. And, although he and Doug have a bitter rivalry in some episodes, he still approves of Doug, regardless. Doug and Carrie sometimes have trouble finding time alone because Arthur tends to get in the way. Arthur also tries to cause trouble with Doug's friends. He especially bullies Spence but also (unsuccessfully) tries it on Deacon, who often refers to him as "the old man". His narcissistic tendencies often lead to confrontations where he puts down other people or tries to take advantage of them. He often displays delusions of grandeur whenever he comes up with absurd business schemes.
- Deacon Palmer (played by Victor Williams) is Doug's best friend and co-worker. Towering in height, and athletic, Deacon is a year and a few weeks younger than Doug, but the more level-headed of the two, in addition to being the classic "family man". He and his wife Kelly have two sons, Major and Kirby. He is often seen hanging out with Doug, whether it is on their lunch breaks at work, over the weekends, or for family gatherings. He will often help Doug plan elaborate schemes to fool Carrie, but he rarely likes to get involved himself. Deacon attended St. John's University in Queens, where he received two bachelor's degrees, one in art history and one in music. In the first-season episode "Best Man", Deacon mentions having served in the National Guard. He also volunteers as a big brother. In season 3, he gets caught having an affair with another woman and separates from Kelly in season 4, reconciling later in the series.
- Spencer "Spence" Olchin (played by Patton Oswalt) (main seasons 1–2, 4–9; recurring, season 3) is another friend of Doug's and the nerd of the group. He tends to be angst-ridden, sickly, and takes an interest in science fiction, fantasy movies, and comic book conventions—interests that his friends do not share. Spence's birthday is February 14. He is of Albanian heritage, and works as a subway token booth clerk. He moved to New York City from rural West Virginia. In one episode he is a "house boy" for Deacon and Kelly. His character is based largely on the actor who plays him. Spence demonstrates intelligence and competence in a variety of pursuits, but he is haunted by his family history, his intimidating and troubled mother, and his inability to protect himself. Numerous episodes mention that Spence is asthmatic (a burden he shares with Danny) and allergic to peanuts (however, in the episode "Richie's Song" he is seen eating Peanut M&M's out of Doug's vehicle). In the season eight episode "Hartford Wailer", Spence is said to be from Ottawa but it appears that he had only said that to Huey Lewis in an attempt to impress him. He has a pet Pug named Allen. In the series' penultimate episode "Single Spaced", Spence shows romantic interest in Carrie when it appears she and Doug will divorce.
- Richard "Richie" Iannucci (played by Larry Romano) (main seasons 1–2; guest season 3, 9) is one of Doug's closest friends. He and Doug were roommates before Doug married Carrie (shown in the episode "Meet By-Product"). He was quietly written out of the show in season three so Romano could work on another sitcom (Kristin). During that season, he only appeared in one episode, "Paint Misbehavin'". He mostly addressed Doug as "Moose". Richie was known as the ladies' man among Doug's friends, even admitting to sleeping with Doug's sister. Richie is an FDNY firefighter. He is also something of a con artist. His last appearance on the show was in the episode "Paint Misbehavin'", in which he has sex (off-screen) with Doug's sister Stephanie (Ricki Lake); although she promises to call him afterward, she has no intention to. He was also briefly seen in a few clips during the flashback montage at the end of the series finale.
- Daniel "Danny" Heffernan (played by Gary Valentine) (recurring seasons 1–3, main cast seasons 4–9) is Doug's cousin, and he is also seen hanging out with Doug, Deacon and Spence. In the show's early seasons, Doug has a negative view of Danny bordering on hate due to the latter's over-eagerness to spend time with the former, but at the end of "S'no Job", they become friends and co-workers, and regularly hang out along with Deacon and Spence. Danny soon becomes Spence's roommate in a small apartment. The two fight like a married couple, and many of the jokes revolve around what looks to their friends like a romantic relationship. At one point, they legally marry in order to get a free TV from a sales pitch for which only married couples are eligible. Danny once owned a pizza parlor, and he is divorced from a woman named Eva. He once had the nickname "Stumpy", given to him by Doug. Episodes "Silent Mite" and "Paint Misbehavin'" reveal that Danny has asthma and uses an inhaler. Gary Valentine and Kevin James are real-life brothers. They each created last names for their acting careers. Valentine is their father's middle name.
- Holly Shumpert (played by Nicole Sullivan) (guest season 3; main cast seasons 5–7, recurring season 4, 8–9) is a polite yet timid dog-walker who, like the Heffernans, lives in Queens, where she was hired by Doug and Carrie to "walk" Arthur. She is often seen arriving at the Heffernan home to pick up Arthur but is also a family friend of the Heffernans. She is often viewed as strange because of her habits, the men she dates, her "sketchy" ethics, and her habit of drinking too much, to which she openly confesses. Holly is a gentle soul, especially as she puts up with Arthur's antics, and is kind to Carrie despite the fact that Carrie often mistreats her. Holly was written out of the series at the beginning of season eight, but she later returned, pregnant, for one last appearance in the series finale ("China Syndrome"). Sullivan also appeared in a different role in the season 3 episode "Pregnant Pause".
- Sara Spooner (played by Lisa Rieffel) (season 1 episodes 1–3, 5–6; mentioned season 3) is Carrie's younger half-sister, an irresponsible aspiring actress. She appears in only five of the first six episodes, and was only mentioned one other time (although not by name) in episode 52 ("Roast Chicken") by Doug as an excuse to his boss to get out of performing a roast. After the show became more popular, Kevin James was asked during an interview to explain what happened to Sara. According to James, the producers could not think of any storylines to develop Rieffel's character, so she was discontinued. During the pilot, she was on camera for roughly half the episode. However, in the other episodes in which she was included, her character did not have much to say or do. Subsequent plot lines and dialogue suggest that Sara Spooner never existed, and that Carrie is an only child.

=== Recurring ===
- Kelly Palmer (played by Merrin Dungey), Deacon's wife, and Carrie's friend. Dungey was absent from the show in 2002 because she needed to take a break from the series and during this period, she and Deacon are separated and engaged in divorce proceedings, and she is involved in a brief affair, before they reconcile.
- Lou Ferrigno (himself) (seasons 3–9) is the actor best known for his role as The Incredible Hulk. He and his wife are the Heffernans' next-door neighbors. A running gag on the series is that the neighbors (including the Heffernans) are fascinated by him, and it gets on his nerves. Lou does not like people telling him Hulk jokes, for instance, and other characters often make reference to that previous role. In one example, Doug is angry, and Lou attempts to calm him down; Doug retorts with the well-known line from the opening of The Incredible Hulk, "Don't make me angry; you wouldn't like me when I'm angry." Also, in the episode "Gym Neighbors", it is revealed that Lou's character suffers from a video-game addiction. Ferrigno's wife Carla makes a number of appearances as herself throughout the series' run.
- Supervisor Patrick O'Boyle (played by Sam McMurray) (seasons 3–9) is section supervisor for the fictional International Parcel Service. He is Doug's boss throughout most of the show, whom he mostly refers to as "Heffernan". A recovering alcoholic and gambling addict, he appears in many of the IPS scenes throughout the series' run. O'Boyle is portrayed as mildly aggressive and annoyed at Doug. A character named Supervisor Jack O'Boyle (played by John F. O'Donohue) appears in an episode from season one ("White Collar", 1999). In season 8, on the episode "Consummate Professional", Doug flashes back to when he first started working at IPS, and the McMurray O'Boyle character is portrayed, not the O'Donohue O'Boyle character.
- Joe Heffernan and Janet Heffernan are Doug's parents (played by Dakin Matthews and Jenny O'Hara) (seasons 3-9). They live in a retirement community in Florida, but occasionally come to visit or Doug goes to see them. They both tend to treat Doug like a child, a role he readily slips into, as comes to light in the Season 4 episode "Screwed Driver" when Janet and Joe come to visit while Carrie is out of town and Doug reverts to adolescent behavior, or when they revealed that they kept getting a new dog to avoid having to tell Doug his childhood dog had died many years earlier. Joe and Janet have a brief marital issue when Janet feels neglected by Joe and she starts spending more time with Arthur.
- Victor Raider-Wexler as Mr Kaplan and Mr Kaufman (seasons 2-9), the wealthy and demanding head of Carrie's law firm. For unknown reasons or continuity error, he appears in two different roles first in seasons 2–6 as Mr Kaplan in the law firm Kaplan, Hornstein & Steckleron and then in season 7–9 as Mr Kaufman when Carrie switches to a new firm.
- Doug Pruzan (played by Alex Skuby) (seasons 2–6) is Carrie's somewhat neurotic boss, a lawyer at a Manhattan law firm.
- Veronica Olchin (season 1; played by Grace Zabriskie, seasons 5–9; played by Anne Meara), Spence's mother. She is portrayed by Zabriskie in her first appearance in "S'aint Valentines", but portrayed by Meara for the balance of the series. Veronica has an on-again/off-again relationship with Arthur, who is portrayed by Meara's real-life husband Jerry Stiller. Meara had previously appeared in "S'aint Valentines" as a woman who flirts with Arthur. Arthur and Veronica marry in the series finale, but divorce a year later.
- Stephanie Heffernan, Doug's sister (played by Ricki Lake) (seasons 3–4, six episodes). A high school gym teacher who feels her parents favor Doug, she briefly dates Doug's friend Richie. She isn't seen and is rarely mentioned after season 4.
- Raymond "Ray" Barone (played by Ray Romano) (seasons 1, 2 & 8; four episodes) is Doug's Long Island friend. Romano and James appearing on each other's shows was part of a network program crossover, as CBS aired both Everybody Loves Raymond and The King of Queens. Romano's appearance was successful enough to warrant all other lead characters (Patricia Heaton, Brad Garrett, Doris Roberts, and Peter Boyle) to appear as their respective characters as well. Appropriately, the four episodes featuring Romano contained "Ray" in their titles ("Road Rayge", "Rayny Day", "Dire Strayts", and "Raygin' Bulls"). Kevin James appeared in 8 episodes in Season 1 of Everybody Loves Raymond (1996) but played a different character.

== Series background ==
Centered on the lives of blue-collar couple Doug and Carrie Heffernan, The King of Queens debuted on CBS on September 21, 1998. During its run, it brought in solid ratings (usually ranking in the Top 40, and peaking at #19 in its fourth season) for the most part and was a Monday night staple, competing with shows such as the long-running drama 7th Heaven. In 2003, when moved to Wednesday and scheduled against The West Wing and Nanny 911, it began to drop in the ratings. The final episode aired on May 14, 2007. The series was shot at Sony Pictures Studios' Stage 28 in Culver City, California. The character of Arthur was conceived with Jerry Stiller in mind, but he initially turned down the role. Veteran comedian Jack Carter was then cast and a pilot was shot. Soon afterward, Stiller changed his mind and took the part, which required re-shooting of scenes featuring Carter.

The King of Queens was partly inspired by the classic television sitcom The Honeymooners, the characters of Doug and Carrie being loosely based on the Kramden couple, with some similar mannerisms and deadpan expressions. In the 2001 episode "Inner Tube", the show pays homage to The Honeymooners as a distraught Doug dreams that he is Ralph Kramden, Carrie is Alice Kramden, and Deacon is Ed Norton. The sequence was filmed in black and white, and the audio quality (including audience reactions) matches a 1950s style.

== Theme song and opening sequences ==
The season one main opening was a simple eight-second sequence which showed the window of a subway train moving past and then quickly stopping at the original show logo, which then peeled off to reveal the names of the show's creators. Starting with the entire 2nd season, the show added a new theme song called "Baby All My Life I Will Be Driving Home to You", which was written by series writers Josh Goldsmith and Cathy Yuspa, composed by Jonathan Wolff and Scott Clausen, and performed by Billy Vera and the Beaters. An instrumental version was used as the closing theme during season 2, but was replaced in season 3 with a new closing theme composed by Kurt Farquhar.

With the show's transition to widescreen, the opening credits introduced in season 2 featured an opening shot of Doug climbing aboard an IPS truck, which then cuts to a long shot of his truck driving past the 111th Street elevated subway station, where the show's logo is digitally placed on the exterior. It then cuts to scenes of Doug, Carrie, and Arthur spending time around Queens, including local landmarks such as the Unisphere and Flushing Meadows–Corona Park. In the season 2 sequence, James' starring credit was placed over a shot of the Brooklyn Bridge with the Manhattan skyline, but was edited after the September 11 attacks that felled the World Trade Center.

== Episodes ==
Season	Episodes	Originally released		Rank	Viewers (in millions)
Season	Episodes	First released	Last released	Rank	Viewers (in millions)
1	25	September 21, 1998	May 17, 1999	35	12.5
2	25	September 20, 1999	May 22, 2000	34	12.7
3	25	October 2, 2000	May 21, 2001	27	13.4
4	25	September 24, 2001	May 20, 2002	19	13.9
5	25	September 23, 2002	May 19, 2003	25	13.0
6	24	October 1, 2003	May 19, 2004	30	11.1
7	22	October 27, 2004	May 18, 2005	48	9.8
8	23	September 19, 2005	May 22, 2006	49	10.0
9	13	December 6, 2006	May 14, 2007	30	11.4

== Reception ==
=== Critical response ===
The show's first season scored a 33% "rotten" rating on Rotten Tomatoes. The website's consensus reads: "Strong chemistry among its charming leads can't help The King of Queens rise above its toothless humor and dated sitcom set-ups." However, Clint Morris of FilmThreat lauded the series, praising James as "one of the funniest guys to grace the TV tube since Bill Cosby." By the ninth and final season, the show received largely positive critical reviews with an 85% "fresh" score on Rotten Tomatoes. The website's consensus reads: "The King of Queens would never reign as a critical darling, but the series bowed out with dignity as an unassuming and undemanding sitcom worth having a beer with." On Metacritic, which assigns a normalized rating, the series has a score of 55 out of 100 based on the reviews of 26 critics, indicating "mixed or average reviews".

== Awards and nominations ==
=== Primetime Emmy Awards ===
In 2006, James received a Primetime Emmy Award nomination for his portrayal of Doug Heffernan.

TV Season	Award	Category	Nominee	Episode	Status	Result
2005–2006	Primetime Emmy Award	Outstanding Lead Actor in a Comedy Series	Kevin James	"Pole Lox"	Nominated	Tony Shalhoub won the award for Monk.

=== BMI Awards ===
The King of Queens received BMI Awards in the TV Music category in 2001, 2002, 2003, and 2004. These awards were presented to Kurt Farquhar, Josh Goldsmith, Andrew Gross, and Cathy Yuspa.

=== Nominations ===
During its final two seasons, The King of Queens was nominated in the People's Choice Awards' Favorite TV Comedy category for the 2007 and 2008 seasons. In 2004, Scott Heineman and Mark Waters were nominated by the Art Directors Guild for the Excellence in Production Design Award. Victor Williams was nominated in 2007 for Outstanding Supporting Actor in a Comedy Series by the NAACP Image Awards.

== Syndication and streaming ==
The show has been in syndication over-the-air stations in the United States from the early 2000s until its removal in fall 2024, and is also a mainstay of cable syndication through the channels of Paramount Skydance and A&E Networks, including Nick at Nite from January 1 to November 10, 2019, TV Land since October 24, 2011, CMT since 2020, Lifetime from 2019 to 2020, and A&E and FYI in 2022. It has also streamed on Peacock since the service's launch in spring 2020. Previously, it aired on TBS from September 2006 until September 2019. In July 2024, Cozi TV acquired the rights to the show along with Married... with Children and began airing on September 9. As of September 2024, the show also began airing on Channel 4 in the United Kingdom, replacing Everybody Loves Raymond. Today, the show is streaming on Paramount+, Pluto TV, and Peacock.

== Home media ==
- In Region 1, Sony Pictures Home Entertainment has released all nine seasons of The King of Queens on DVD in the U.S. and Canada.
- In Region 2, Paramount Home Entertainment has released all nine seasons on DVD in the UK. The complete series has also been released in Germany by Koch Media.
- In Region 4, Paramount Home Entertainment has released all nine seasons on DVD in Australia.

DVD Name	Ep #	Release dates				
DVD Name	Ep #	Region 1 (US)	Region 1 (CAN)	Region 2 (UK)	Region 2 (Germany)	Region 4 (Australia)
The Complete First Season	25 (3 discs)	November 18, 2003	August 11, 2009	January 29, 2007	November 26, 2004	January 11, 2007
The Complete Second Season	25 (3 discs)	April 20, 2004	August 11, 2009	July 9, 2007	March 31, 2005	July 12, 2007
The Complete Third Season	25 (3 discs)	February 22, 2005	August 11, 2009	September 15, 2008	September 2, 2005	July 31, 2008
The Complete Fourth Season	25 (3 discs)	June 14, 2005	January 5, 2010	February 9, 2009	December 2, 2005	January 15, 2009
The Complete Fifth Season	25 (3 discs)	June 20, 2006	January 5, 2010	May 18, 2009	May 26, 2006	May 7, 2009
The Complete Sixth Season	24 (3 discs)	September 19, 2006	January 5, 2010	July 13, 2009	November 24, 2006	August 6, 2009
The Complete Seventh Season	22 (3 discs)	January 16, 2007	November 9, 2010	March 22, 2010	March 9, 2007	April 1, 2010
The Complete Eighth Season	23 (3 discs)	May 1, 2007	November 9, 2010	June 21, 2010	August 24, 2007	June 3, 2010
The Complete Ninth Season	13 (2 discs)	September 25, 2007	November 9, 2010	September 20, 2010	October 19, 2007	September 16, 2010
The Complete Series Box Set	207 (27 discs)	November 6, 2007	TBA	May 7, 2012	March 7, 2008	November 5, 2014

=== Blu-ray releases ===
Seasons 2 and 3 were released on Blu-ray disc by Koch Media on November 21, 2008. On March 26, 2015, Koch Media released the whole series on Blu-ray in HD. The complete box set is distributed for Region B/2.

== Reunion and future ==
In March 2021, a reunion table read was hosted on Facebook. The reunion was held to benefit Henry Street Settlement, a New York City social services, health care, and arts organization where Stiller got his start in theater. Series stars James, Remini, Williams, Oswalt, Valentine, Sullivan, and guest star Rachel Dratch all reprised their roles in the table read with Weithorn, reciting the 2003 episode "Cowardly Lyin'". The reunion was moderated by Sibley Scoles and also featured a video tribute to Stiller. In January 2024, James stated to The Kelly Clarkson Show, that there would be no reboot due to the death of Stiller.

== See also ==
- Молодожёны (2011–2012), Russian adaptation of the sitcom The King of Queens
- Kevin Can Wait (2016–2018), another sitcom starring Kevin James and Leah Remini
