= Arthur Spooner =

Fictional Character

- The King of Queens character
- First appearance: "Pilot" (episode 1.01)
- Last appearance: "China Syndrome" (episode 9.13)
- Portrayed by: Jack Carter (pilot); Jerry Stiller (series)

In-universe information
- Gender: Male
- Occupation: Served in the U.S. Army during World War II, with countless jobs after that; prior to Carrie's birth he was an actor
- Spouses: Sophia Spooner (widowed); Lily Spooner (divorced); Tessie Spooner (widowed); Veronica Olchin (divorced)
- Children: Carrie Spooner; Sara Spooner (written out after the first season)
- Birth date: September 1926
- Birth place: Brooklyn, New York City, U.S.

Arthur Eugene Spooner is a fictional character played by Jerry Stiller in the American sitcom The King of Queens. He lives with his daughter Carrie and her husband, Doug Heffernan, in Rego Park, Queens, New York.

== Biography ==
Little is known about Arthur's early life. He was born in 1926 to an abusive father (played in one episode by Stiller's own son, Ben Stiller), but nothing is known about his mother. He lived on a farm from the ages of 7 to 10, then again at 43, was a gifted singer as a child, performed jigs for the workers at the Empire State Building, has an estranged half-brother named Skitch (played in one episode by Shelley Berman), was bald until the age of 12, and lost his virginity to someone named Peppermint Patty.

He possibly attended the State University of New York at Oneonta, having mentioned playing for the "Oneonta Red Dragons".

Arthur served in World War II in the Italian theater and in The Battle of the Bulge, and also mentions being in Paris, France. He variously claims to have been in the US Army 33rd Brigade and the 71st Infantry Division. At some point during his enlistment, he left a man named Jack Russell for dead.

Sometime after the war, Arthur took up a career as an actor, performing on Broadway and at other venues. It was during this time that he met his first wife, Sophia, a show dancer. After a night of passion, the couple found out that Sophia was pregnant, and decided to get married for the sake of the child, Simone (later Carrie). Arthur lost Carrie's birth name of Simone in a poker game and she had to switch names with her cousin Carrie. (Carrie has no recollection of this incident.)

He quit his acting career in an attempt to create a more stable life for his daughter. Ironically, his unstable marital life and always unsure job situation led to even less security than Carrie might have had if Arthur remained an actor. Doug and Carrie occasionally point out this fact, but Arthur always discounts it.

During Carrie's young life, Arthur held an innumerable number of jobs, including at a crab cannery in Maryland, jobs in sales, a brief stint working for PBS on Sesame Street, and many others. He worked briefly in customer service, stating if a little person walked into his store it was all he could talk about for years. He also sold ribbons at the time Doug and Carrie were purchasing their home. He thought it was a good idea to cut out the middle man and offer little girls in the schoolyard ribbons to buy for their hair, which Carrie convinced him was a bad idea. He was unable to maintain any of these careers for more than a month at a time, resulting in a very volatile home life for his family. Though he was never able to hold down a job for very long, he did land 74 of them, one as a woman. However, in another episode, he claims to have had "nearly 200".

In 1985, Sophia died, leaving Arthur a widower and the single parent of 15-year-old Carrie. With Arthur unable to stay employed, Carrie was forced to work in addition to attending high school. Because of this, she never attended college.

During a Thanksgiving episode, it was mentioned that Arthur met his second wife Lily at a bus stop. Arthur said "Why don't you go back to the corner where I found you?!", and Lily replied "I was waiting for the bus!"

In the pilot episode, Arthur's third wife Tessie has died. Arthur subsequently burns his house down while cooking on his "lucky hot plate". This forces Arthur and his other daughter Sara (who was written out during the first season without explanation) to move in with Carrie and Doug. Arthur quickly shows himself to be obnoxious, boorish, and mentally unstable, frequently bursting into tirades at the slightest provocation. His grating personality angers Doug, but as the series progresses, they grow accustomed to each other.

Arthur always adamantly refused to be outdone or slighted in any conceivable manner. During the course of the show, he forced a woman to lose her job because she "hurt his feelings", caused countless false emergencies at his senior center, reduced many people to tears, investigated purported similarities between himself and fictional characters, engaged in arguments with tough younger individuals, often forcing Doug to protect him, loudly proclaimed most of his views on Doug and Carrie's wedding video, and relentlessly insulted Douglas' friends, particularly Spence.

A good example of Arthur's behavior is when he discovers an old episode airing of The $10,000 Pyramid on which he appeared in 1976, a fact that he has told Doug "several dozen times". When asked if he won, Arthur, in turn, asks if he would be "living in this dump if [he had]". He later asks for Carrie's help in "[suing] the boyish grin off of Dick Clark's face" because he never got the full year's supply of Rice-A-Roni that he had been promised after the appearance, a scandal he has named "Rice-A-Roni-gate". In an effort to placate Arthur, Clark's representative offers to give him a book instead of the boxed rice dish, the continued production of which the representative is unsure. After assuring the representative that Rice-A-Roni is "still made in a variety of mouth-watering flavors," Arthur refuses, screaming "I don't wanna read. I wanna eat!". Arthur ultimately receives a 30-year supply of Rice-A-Roni, in addition to the original supply he was promised on the game show, after (presumably) blackmailing Dick Clark with a photo of Clark "locked in a muddy embrace with Fannie Flagg", which was captured from his appearance on the Battle of the Network Stars. (The vintage Pyramid clip used for the episode is from an actual appearance Stiller made on the game show that same year.) Additionally, in the season 6 episode "Trash Talker", Arthur mentions that he allegedly has a lifelong hatred for Larry King, stemming from when they were kids and Arthur stole one of King's prized baseball cards and was subsequently kicked out of school after King tattled on him.

Arthur marries his fourth wife Veronica Olchin (played by Stiller's real wife Anne Meara), mother of Doug's friend Spence Olchin, in the series finale "China Syndrome", and divorce one year later.

Perhaps Arthur's most notable trait is his tendency to speak in flowing, elegant sentences, typically employing long words.

He also frequently used outdated expressions, such as "cat's feet". Likewise, he calls cell phones "cellular telephones", referred to Istanbul as "Constantinople" and identifies catsup by its proper name rather than by the popular brand name that is universally called "Ketchup".

One of his most often used quotes is "How dare you!" He has also been known to say "Thank you very little!" and "That's a separate issue!" He often remarks to those who pry into his business, "That's none of your affair!" When he feels that he is being pushed around or told what to do (usually by his daughter, Carrie), Arthur often responds by implying that the person is a dictator (e.g. "yes, mein fuhrer!") or a smear tactic politician (e.g. "no thank you Senator McCarthy!").

He almost invariably addresses or refers to Doug by his full name "Douglas". Likewise, when he addresses Doug's cousin Danny, he calls him his full name "Daniel". He also addresses Spence by his full name "Spencer", Doug and Carrie's neighbor Lou Ferrigno as "Louis" and Deacon as "Mr. Palmer".

== Role in the series ==
Sarcastic, brash, and always scheming, Arthur lives in the basement of Doug and Carrie's house. He is walked by a dog walker named Holly Shumpert (Nicole Sullivan), and his best friend is Mickey (Ford Rainey).

Quick to take offense, he shouts frequently and often unnecessarily, and often comes up with absolutely absurd, irregular, or illogical money-making scams. He is basically a selfish, narcissistic individual who feels the world owes him, and that he needs to be treated a certain way for who he thinks he is. Arthur frequently makes bizarre claims (for example, that he invented the moist towelette, and claiming that Charles M. Schulz based Charlie Brown on Arthur's life).

Arthur is outspoken for left-leaning political views and in some episodes a supporter of the communist nations around the world. In the episode "Steve Moscow" he claims that the Soviet Union was a "workers' paradise", and in the episode "Strike Out", he says that he was once enrolled at a socialist summer camp. When Doug goes on strike, Arthur almost kisses him out of pride; these feelings of affection quickly turn into disgust when Doug takes a job at a school as a substitute teacher (with Arthur angrily remarking: "Whatever helps you sleep at night you douche"). However, in one episode, in a debate with Spence on whether the United States should lift the embargo on Cuba, Arthur was against the lifting of the embargo and Spence was for it (yet, in context, the debate was a scene where Arthur tried to prove he could withstand any argument, resulting in him deferring from the point, and vehemently insulting Spence).

Arthur's eccentricity extends to going so far as to explicitly forbid a variety of things from the Heffernan household, including but not limited to: Halloween, red pens, soft cheese, non-American VCRs (but not DVD players), any mention of Franklin D. Roosevelt's paralytic illness, and miniature Kit Kats.

At times he can offer fatherly advice, and cares about Doug and Carrie. In the episode "Deacon Blues" he tells Carrie, "You're not angry cookie, you're scared", as to show Carrie her true feelings. Other times, however, he may become a burden on Doug and Carrie, which Doug claims is unfair because he owns the house. Arthur's odd behavior is said to result from him being neglected as a child. He is often seen as a child because Doug and Carrie have to take care of him. However, around strangers, he often claims that he owns the home (in one episode, after discovering what the property is worth, he stages an 'open house', taking offers on the place), his daughter works at menial labor despite Arthur's invented wealth, and Doug is a complete deadbeat.

Arthur's handling of money is often a matter of contention. He regularly steals change from Doug and has, according to Carrie, "no retirement, no insurance, no Social Security". He once planned to save a large amount of money for a potential grandchild, but only remarks "the dog races are terribly fixed". He often claims to be very wealthy, especially when wooing women. He has almost no money at all, not even a few dollars, as a check he writes for a $1.42 coffee bounces. Insulted by the barista's distrust of his financial situation, he claims to have vast offshore accounts, and is in the process of moving money around.

== Casting of the role ==
According to the DVD commentary of the pilot episode, the character of Arthur was conceived with Jerry Stiller in mind, but he initially turned down the role. Veteran comedian Jack Carter was then cast and a pilot was shot. Soon afterward, Stiller changed his mind and took the part, which required reshooting of scenes featuring Carter.
