= Jerry Stiller =

American comedian and actor (1927–2020)

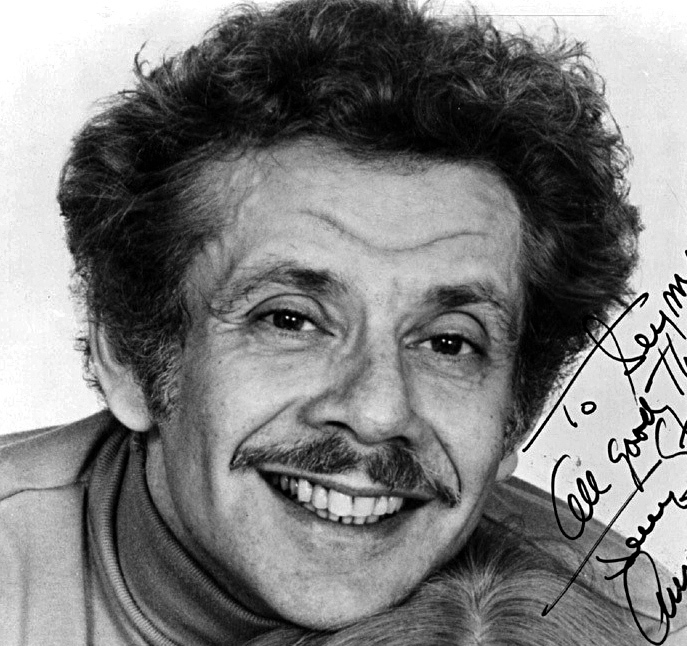
- Stiller in 1965
- Born: Gerald Isaac Stiller; June 8, 1927; New York City, U.S.
- Died: May 11, 2020 (aged 92); New York City, U.S.
- Burial place: Nantucket Jewish Cemetery
- Education: Syracuse University (BA)
- Occupations: Comedian; actor
- Years active: 1953–2016
- Spouse: Anne Meara (m. 1954; died 2015)
- Children: Ben Stiller and Amy Stiller
- Relatives: Christine Taylor (daughter-in-law)

Gerald Isaac Stiller (June 8, 1927 – May 11, 2020) was an American comedian and actor. He spent many years as part of the comedy duo Stiller and Meara with his wife, Anne Meara, to whom he was married for over 60 years until her death in 2015. Stiller saw a late-career resurgence starting in 1993, playing Frank Costanza on the sitcom Seinfeld, a part which earned him an Emmy nomination. In 1998, Stiller began his role as Arthur Spooner on the CBS comedy series The King of Queens, another role that garnered widespread acclaim.

Stiller appeared together with his son Ben Stiller in films such as Zoolander, Heavyweights, Hot Pursuit, The Heartbreak Kid, and Zoolander 2. He also performed voice-over work for films and television, including The Lion King 1½ and Planes: Fire and Rescue. In his later career, Stiller became known for portraying grumpy and eccentric characters who were nevertheless beloved.

== Early life ==
The eldest of four children, Gerald Isaac Stiller was born on June 8, 1927, at Unity Hospital in Brooklyn, New York City, to Bella (née Citron; 1902–1954) and William Stiller (1896–1999), a taxi and bus driver. His family is Jewish. His paternal grandparents emigrated from Galicia (southeast Poland and western Ukraine), and his mother was born in Frampol, in modern-day eastern Poland. He lived in the Williamsburg and East New York neighborhoods of Brooklyn before his family moved to the Lower East Side of Manhattan, where he attended Seward Park High School and played Adolf Hitler in a school production.

Upon his return from service in the U.S. Army during World War II, Stiller attended Syracuse University, earning a bachelor's degree in Speech and Drama in 1950. He also studied drama at HB Studio in Greenwich Village. In the 1953 Phoenix Theater production of Coriolanus (produced by John Houseman), Stiller, along with Gene Saks and Jack Klugman, formed (as told by Houseman in the 1980 memoir Front and Center) "the best trio of Shakespearian clowns that I have ever seen on any stage".

Also in 1953, Stiller met actress-comedian Anne Meara, and they married in 1954. Until Stiller suggested it, Meara had never thought of doing comedy. "Jerry started us being a comedy team," she said. "He always thought I would be a great comedy partner." They joined the St. Louis improv company The Compass Players in 1959, directed by David Shepherd. After leaving, they began performing together. In 1961, they were performing in nightclubs in New York City and by the following year were considered a "national phenomenon", said the New York Times. They lived in Washington Heights in Manhattan.

== Stiller and Meara ==
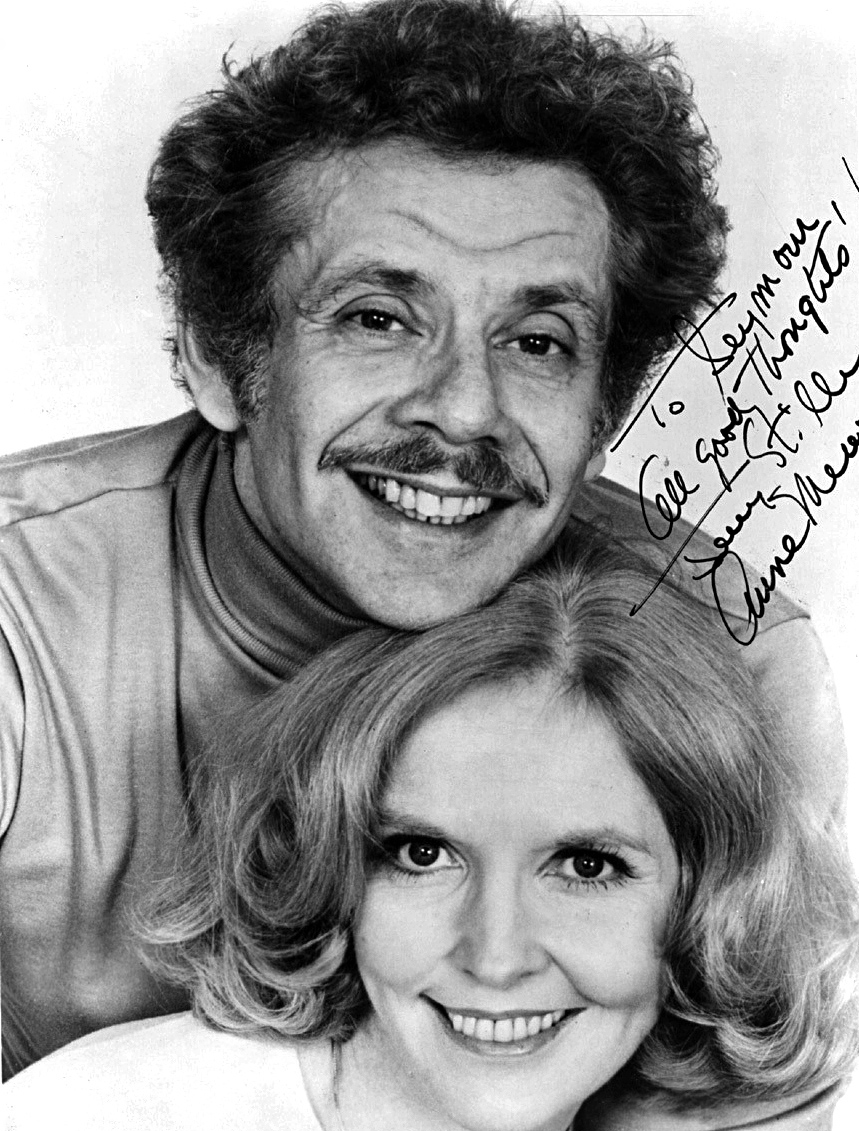
Stiller and Meara publicity photo with an autograph, 1965

The comedy team Stiller and Meara, composed of Stiller and his wife, Anne Meara, was successful throughout the 1960s, with numerous appearances on television variety programs, primarily on The Ed Sullivan Show. In 1970, they broke up the live act before it broke up their marriage. They subsequently forged a career in radio commercials, notably the campaign for Blue Nun wine. They also starred in their own syndicated five-minute sketch comedy show on radio, Take Five with Stiller and Meara, from 1977 to 1978.

From 1979 to 1982, Stiller and Meara hosted HBO Sneak Previews, a half-hour show produced monthly on which they described the movies and programs to be featured in the coming month. They also did some comedy sketches between show discussions. The duo had their own 1986 TV sitcom, The Stiller and Meara Show, in which Stiller played the deputy mayor of New York City and Meara portrayed his wife, a TV commercial actress.

== Career resurgence ==
=== Seinfeld ===
Late in his career, Stiller earned the part of the short-tempered Frank Costanza, father of George Costanza, on the sitcom Seinfeld. He played the role from 1993 until 1998. Stiller's character as initially envisioned was a "meek" and "Thurberesque" character that required him to wear a bald cap. After a couple of days of rehearsal, Stiller realized the character was not working and asked Seinfeld co-creator Larry David if he could perform the character in a different way, which was more in line with his final characterization on the show. For his portrayal of Frank, Stiller gained widespread critical and popular acclaim, including being nominated for an Emmy for Outstanding Guest Actor in a Comedy Series in 1997 and winning an American Comedy Award for Funniest Male Guest Appearance in a TV Series in 1998.

=== The King of Queens ===
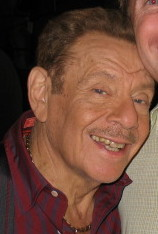
Stiller in 2006

After Seinfeld ended, Stiller had planned on retiring. However, Kevin James asked him to join the cast of The King of Queens. James, who played the leading role of Doug Heffernan, had told Stiller that he needed him to have a successful show. Stiller agreed and played the role of Arthur Spooner, the father of Carrie Heffernan, from 1998 until 2007. Stiller said that this role tested his acting ability more than any other had, and that, before being a part of The King of Queens, he only saw himself as a "decent actor".

=== Other appearances ===
Stiller played himself in filmed skits opening and closing Canadian rock band Rush's 30th Anniversary Tour concerts in 2004. These appearances are seen on the band's DVD R30: 30th Anniversary World Tour, released in 2005. Stiller later appeared in cameos for in-concert films for the band's 2007–08 Snakes & Arrows Tour. Stiller appeared on Dick Clark's $20,000 Pyramid show in the 1970s, and footage of the appearance was edited into an episode of The King of Queens to assist the storyline about his character being a contestant on the show, and, after losing, being bitter about the experience, as he never received his parting gift, a years supply of Rice-A-Roni. He also made several appearances on the game show Tattletales with his wife, Anne Meara.

In the late 1990s, Stiller appeared in a series of Nike television commercials as the ghost of deceased Green Bay Packers head coach Vince Lombardi. He also appeared in various motion pictures, most notably Hairspray (1988), Secret of the Andes (1999), Zoolander (2001) and Hairspray (2007). He appeared together with his son Ben Stiller in Zoolander, as well as films including Hot Pursuit (1987), Highway to Hell (1992), Heavyweights (1995), The Heartbreak Kid (2007), and Zoolander 2 (2016). He also performed voice work for films such as The Lion King 1½ and Planes: Fire and Rescue.

On February 9, 2007, Stiller and Meara were honored with a joint star on the Hollywood Walk of Fame. On October 28, 2010, the couple appeared on an episode of The Daily Show with Jon Stewart. Stiller voiced the announcer on the children's educational show Crashbox. Starting in October 2010, Stiller and Meara began starring in Stiller & Meara, a Yahoo web series from Red Hour Digital in which they discussed current topics. Each episode was about two minutes long. Stiller also worked as a spokesman for Xfinity.

== Author ==
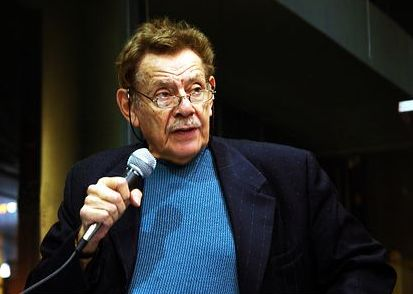
Stiller at a book reading for Festivus in New York City in 2005

Stiller wrote the foreword to the 2005 book Festivus: The Holiday for the Rest of Us (ISBN 0-446-69674-9) by Allen Salkin. The book discussed Festivus, the fictional holiday promulgated by Stiller's Seinfeld character Frank Costanza.

Stiller also authored a memoir titled Married to Laughter: A Love Story Featuring Anne Meara, which was published by Simon & Schuster (ISBN 0-684-86903-9).

== Personal life ==
Stiller was married to Anne Meara for over 60 years, from 1954 until her death on May 23, 2015. The two met in an agent's office. Meara was upset about an interaction with the casting agent, so Stiller took her out for coffee — all he could afford — and they remained together thereafter. Meara was Irish Catholic and converted to Judaism before the couple's children were born. They had two children: actress Amy Stiller (born 1961) and actor-comedian Ben Stiller (born 1965). He had two grandchildren through Ben.

== Death ==
On May 11, 2020, Stiller died from natural causes at his home on the Upper West Side of Manhattan at the age of 92. Many actors Stiller worked with paid tributes to him, including Seinfeld castmates Jerry Seinfeld, Julia Louis-Dreyfus, Jason Alexander, and Michael Richards and King of Queens castmates Kevin James and Leah Remini. He is buried in Nantucket, Massachusetts at the Nantucket Jewish Cemetery.

== Filmography ==
=== Film ===
Year	Film	Role	Notes	Ref(s)
1970	Lovers and Other Strangers	Jim	Uncredited	
1974	The Taking of Pelham One Two Three	Lt. Rico Patrone		
1974	Airport 1975	Sam		
1976	The Ritz	Carmine Vespucci		
1977	Nasty Habits	P.R. Priest		
1980	Those Lips, Those Eyes	Mr. Shoemaker		
1986	Seize the Day	Dr. Tamkin		
1987	Hot Pursuit	Victor Honeywell		
1987	Nadine	Raymond Escobar		
1988	Hairspray	Wilbur Turnblad		
1989	That's Adequate	Sid Lane		
1990	Little Vegas	Sam		
1992	Highway to Hell	The Desk Cop		
1992	Freefall	Emily's Father	Short	
1993	The Pickle	Phil Hirsch		
1995	Heavyweights	Harvey Bushkin		
1997	A Rat's Tale	Prof. Plumpingham		
1997	Camp Stories	Schlomo		
1997	Stag	Ted		
1997	The Deli	Petey Cheesecake		
1999	A Fish in the Bathtub	Sam Kaplan		
1999	Secret of the Andes	Dr. Golfisch		
1999	The Suburbans	Speedo Silverburg		
2000	The Independent	Monty Fineman		
2000	My 5 Wives	Don Giovani		
2000	Chump Change	The Colonel		
2001	Zoolander	Maury Ballstein		
2001	On the Line	Nathan		
2002	Serving Sara	Milton the Cop		
2004	Teacher's Pet	Pretty Boy	Voice	
2004	The Lion King 1½	Uncle Max	Voice; Direct-to-DVD	
2004	Anchorman: The Legend of Ron Burgundy	Man in Bar	Uncredited	
2005	R30: 30th Anniversary World Tour	Himself		
2007	Hairspray	Mr. Pinky		
2007	The Heartbreak Kid	Doc		
2008	Snakes & Arrows Live	Heidi		
2011	Swinging with the Finkels	Mr. Winters		
2012	Foodfight!	General X	Voice	
2012	Excuse Me for Living	Morty		
2014	Planes: Fire & Rescue	Harvey	Voice	
2014	Simpler Times	Harry	Short	
2016	Zoolander 2	Maury Ballstein	Cameo	

=== Television ===
Year	Show	Role	Notes	Ref(s)
1956–1957	Studio One in Hollywood	Sergeant Joe Capriotti / Hugh	2 episodes	
1957	The Big Story	Tyler	Episode: "The Hoax"	
1959	Armstrong Circle Theatre	Pfc. Elwood Johnson	Episode: "Thunder Over Berlin"	
1962	The Defenders	Sergeant Wysenski	Episode: "The Empty Chute"	
1962	General Electric Theater	Harold	Episode: "Acres and Pains"	
1964	Brenner	Chris Zelco	Episode: "The Plain Truth"	
1964–1965	Linus the Lionhearted		3 episodes	
1966–1978	The Mike Douglas Show	Himself	40 episodes	
1967–1973	The Tonight Show Starring Johnny Carson	Himself	14 episodes	
1969	That's Life	Himself	Episode: "Our First Fight"	
1971–1972	The Courtship of Eddie's Father	Mr. Landon / Paul Sterling	2 episodes	
1971–1973	Love, American Style	Leonard Ferguson / Harry	2 episodes	
1972	The Carol Burnett Show	Himself	Episode: "#6.8"	
1972–1973	The Paul Lynde Show	Barney Dickerson	4 episodes	
1975–1976	Joe and Sons	Gus Duzik	14 episodes	
1976	Phyllis	Burt Hillman	Episode: "Phyllis and the Jumper"	
1976	Rhoda	Lloyd Zimmer	Episode: "A Touch of Classy"	
1979	Time Express	Edward Chernoff	Episode: "Garbage Man/Doctor's Wife"	
1979–1983	The Love Boat	Harlan Weatherly / Tony Vitelli / Bud Hanrahan	3 episodes	
1980–1982	Archie Bunker's Place	Carmine	2 episodes	
1981	Madame X	Burt Orland	Television film	
1981	Hart to Hart	Myron Finkle	Episode: "Murder Takes a Bow"	
1981	Private Benjamin	Sgt. Muldoon	Episode: "So Long, Sergeant Ross"	
1982	Simon & Simon	Harold Traxler	Episode: "The Uncivil Servant"	
1982	Alice	Gordy	Episode: "Do You Take This Waitress"	
1983	Reading Rainbow	Dinosaur Comic	Episode: "Digging Up Dinosaurs"	
1983	Amanda's	Sal	Episode: "You Were Meant for Me"	
1983	The Other Woman	Mel Binns	Television film	
1984	Trapper John, M.D.	Artie Merrow	Episode: "Where There's a Will"	
1985	The Equalizer	Brahms	Episode: "The Equalizer" (Pilot)	
1985	Tales from the Darkside	Luther Mandrake	Episode: "The Devil's Advocate"	
1986	Screen Two	Marty de Reske	Episode: "The McGuffin"	
1987	Saturday Night Live	Stu	Episode: "Charlton Heston/Wynton Marsalis"	
1988–1989	Tattingers	Sid Wilbur	14 episodes	
1989	Murder, She Wrote	SFPD Lt. Birnbaum	Episode: "When the Fat Lady Sings"	
1990	Monsters	Victor	Episode: "One Wolf's Family"	
1990	Sweet 15	Waterman	Television film	
1991	American Playhouse	Sam / Seymour Shapir	2 episodes	
1991	Women & Men 2	Irving	Television film	
1992–1996	Law & Order	Michael Tobis / Sam Pokras	2 episodes	
1993–1998	Seinfeld	Frank Costanza	26 episodes	
1993	L.A. Law	Nat Pincus	Episode: "Rhyme and Punishment"	
1994	In the Heat of the Night	Rabbi Feldman	Episode: "The Rabbi"	
1995	Homicide: Life on the Street	McGonnigal	Episode: "In Search of Crimes Past"	
1996	Deadly Games	Phil Cullen	Episode: "Dr. Kramer"	
1997	Subway Stories	Old Man	Television film	
1998	Touched by an Angel	Maury Salt	Episode: "Cry and You Cry Alone"	
1998	The Larry Sanders Show	Himself	Episode: "I Buried Sid"	
1998	Hercules	Eagle	Voice; Episode: "Hercules and the Promethus Affair"	
1998–2007	The King of Queens	Arthur Spooner	195 episodes	
2000–2002	Teacher's Pet	Pretty Boy	Voice; 11 episodes	
2003	Odd Job Jack	Jim McDonald	Episode: "A Candidacy of Dunces"	
2003	Sex and the City	Mr. Brady	Episode: "One"	
2009	Wonder Pets!	Bernie	Voice; Episode: Save the Old White Mouse	
2009	Mercy	Joe Thalberg	Episode: "The Last Thing I Said Was"	
2010	Ice Dreams	Skipper	Television film	
2010–2011	Fish Hooks	Principal Stickler	Voice; 21 episodes	
2011	The Good Wife	Judge Felix Afterman	Episode: "Silver Bullet"	
2014	How Murray Saved Christmas	Murray Weiner	Voice; Television film	
2016	Zoolander: Super Model	Maury Ballstein	Voice; Television film (final film role)	

=== Stage ===
Year	Title	Role	Theatre	Ref(s)
1954	The Golden Apple	Mayor Juniper	Alvin Theatre	
1955	The Carefree Tree	The Propertyman	Phoenix Theatre, Broadway	
1956	Diary of a Scoundrel	Styopka	Phoenix Theatre, Broadway	
1956	The Good Woman of Setzuan	Policeman	Phoenix Theatre, Broadway	
1957	Measure for Measure	Barnadine	Phoenix Theatre, Broadway	
1957	The Taming of the Shrew	Biondello	Phoenix Theatre, Broadway	
1958	The Power and the Glory	Mestizo	Phoenix Theatre, Broadway	
1975	The Ritz	Carmen Vespucci	Longacre Theatre, Broadway	
1977	The Unexpected Guest	Harry Mullin	Little Theatre, Broadway	
1980	Passione	Berto	Morosco Theatre, Broadway	
1984	Hurlyburly	Artie	Ethel Barrymore Theatre, Broadway	
1993	Three Men on a Horse	Charlie	Lyceum Theatre, Broadway	
1994	What's Wrong with This Picture?	Sid	Brooks Atkinson Theatre, Broadway	
1997	The Three Sisters	Chebutykin	Criterion Center Stage Right, Broadway	

== Books ==
- Stiller, Jerry (2000). Married to Laughter: A Love Story Featuring Anne Meara. Simon & Schuster. ISBN 978-0-6848-6903-2.
- Salkin, Allen (2005). Festivus: The Holiday for the Rest of Us. Grand Central Publishing. ISBN 978-0-4466-9674-6. (forward)

== Accolades ==
=== Awards and nominations ===
Year	Award	Category	Nominees	Result
1997	Primetime Emmy Awards	Outstanding Guest Actor in a Comedy Series	Seinfeld	Nominated
2001	Grammy Awards	Best Spoken Word Album	Married to Laughter: A Love Story	Nominated
2007	Screen Actors Guild Awards	Outstanding Cast in a Motion Picture	Hairspray	Nominated

=== Other ===
- In 2007, Stiller and his wife Anne Meara received a star on the Hollywood Walk of Fame.
