= Kevin James =

American comedian and actor (born 1965)

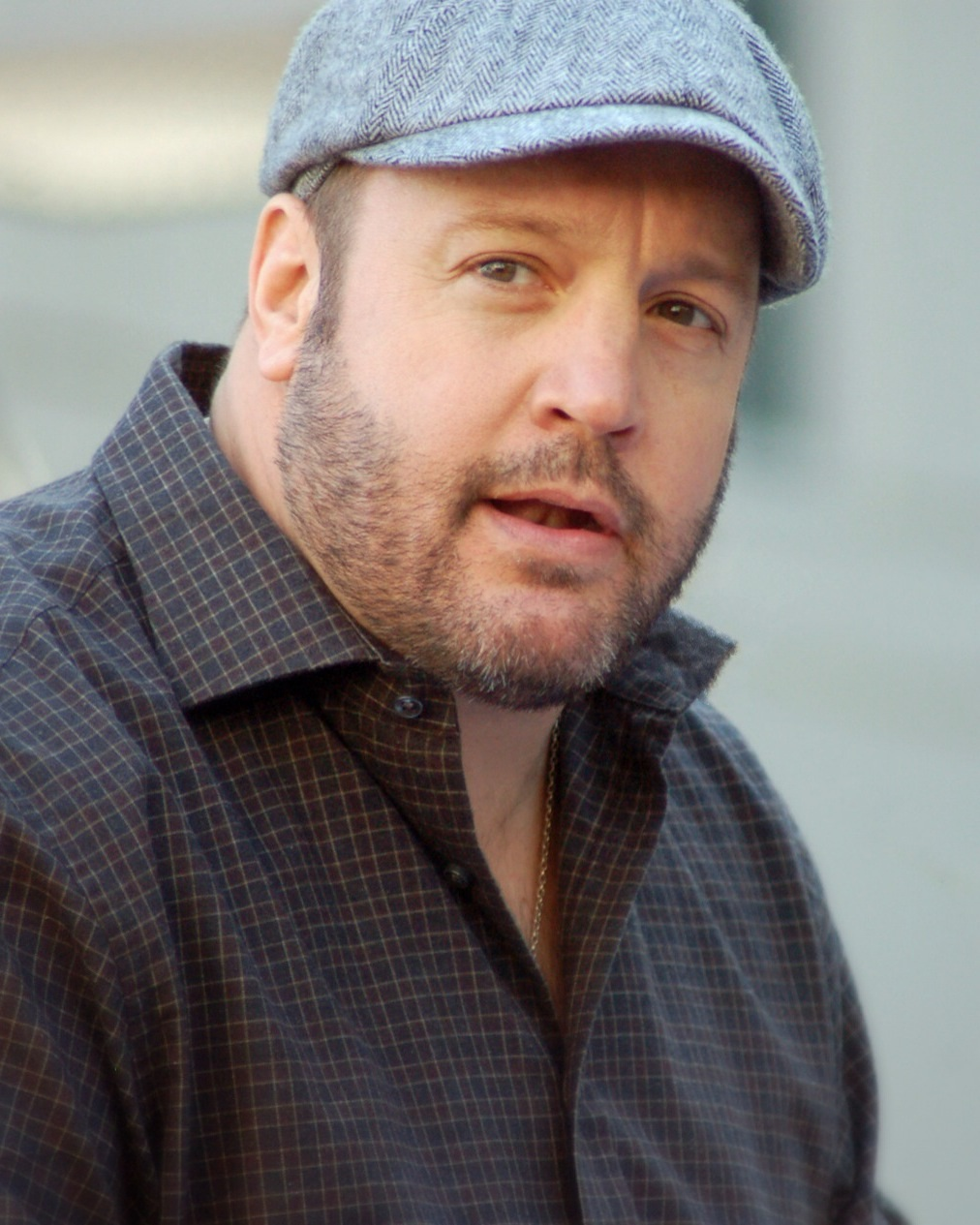
- James in Los Angeles in 2011
- Born: Kevin George Knipfing; April 26, 1965 (age 61); Mineola, New York, U.S.
- Occupations: Actor; comedian; writer; producer
- Years active: 1989–present
- Spouse: Steffiana de la Cruz (m. 2004)
- Children: 4
- Website: www.kevinjames.com

Kevin George Knipfing (born April 26, 1965) known professionally as Kevin James, is an American actor, comedian, writer and producer. James began his career as a stand-up comedian on Long Island in the late 1980s before rising to prominence for playing Doug Heffernan on the CBS sitcom The King of Queens (1998–2007), for which he received a nomination for Primetime Emmy Award for Outstanding Lead Actor in a Comedy Series in 2006.

In 2004, James made his first film appearance in 50 First Dates, and the following year co-starred in Hitch. He went on to star in I Now Pronounce You Chuck & Larry (2007), Paul Blart: Mall Cop (2009), Grown Ups (2010), Zookeeper (2011), Here Comes the Boom (2012), and Pixels (2015). He also voiced characters in the animated films Monster House, Barnyard (both 2006), and Hotel Transylvania (2012). He also was nominated for a People's Choice Award in 2017 for his role on the CBS sitcom Kevin Can Wait (2016–2018). James also appeared in several dramatic roles, including The Dilemma (2011), Little Boy (2015), and Becky (2020). In 2026, he starred in the romantic comedy Solo Mio.

== Early life ==
Kevin George Knipfing was born in Mineola, New York, on April 26, 1965, to office worker Janet Klein and insurance agency owner Joseph Valentine Knipfing Jr. His father is of German ancestry, and his mother is Jewish. He grew up in Stony Brook, New York, with a sister named Leslie and an older brother named Gary, who also became a comedian and actor, adopting the stage name Gary Valentine. They were raised Catholic.

James graduated from Ward Melville High School in 1983, where he reached the top position on the wrestling team, one spot above his friend and future professional wrestler Mick Foley. Both wrestled in the Heavyweight weight class. When James suffered a season-ending back injury, Foley took over the first string position. Both men went on to study at the State University of New York at Cortland, where James played halfback on the varsity football team until another back injury permanently ended his sporting ambitions.

== Career ==
=== Stand-up ===
James began doing stand-up comedy in 1989, making his debut at Richie Minervini's East Side Comedy Club on Long Island. He also started performing comedy with a troupe at the club, during which time he adopted "James" as his stage surname in honor of his favorite school teacher. He gained popularity through numerous appearances on various talk shows, including The Tonight Show with Jay Leno, Late Show with David Letterman, Late Night with Conan O'Brien, Dennis Miller Live, The Late Late Show, The Rosie O'Donnell Show, The Ellen DeGeneres Show, and Live with Regis and Kathie Lee. James was listed at No. 76 on Comedy Central's list of the 100 Greatest Stand-Up Comedians. James has also done his stand-up routine on Just for Laughs, an annual comedy festival in Montreal, Quebec. Later he was on commercials for Mazzio's Italian Eatery. In 2001, James did his own stand-up special called Kevin James: Sweat the Small Stuff. He has also appeared as a musical guest on Just for Laughs. In 2018, James released another stand-up special on Netflix called Kevin James: Never Don't Give Up. In 2024, James released his third special on Amazon Prime Video called Kevin James: Irregardless.

=== Television ===
James' first television job was in 1991 on The New Candid Camera, where he used his comedy timing and improvisation skills playing the actor that pulled practical jokes on unsuspecting people. He appeared in A&E's An Evening at the Improv in 1994. James appeared on television as the announcer for the MTV sports game show SandBlast from 1994 to 1996.

James later moved to Los Angeles and befriended Ray Romano, and he guest-starred on a few episodes of Romano's hit CBS sitcom, Everybody Loves Raymond. These appearances led to the development of his own sitcom, The King of Queens, which ran on CBS from September 21, 1998, to May 14, 2007, James played working class parcel delivery man Doug Heffernan who works for a company known as IPS. He is married to Carrie (Leah Remini), a sharp-tongued, ambitious secretary at a Manhattan law firm who is far less content with working-class life in Queens. Her obsessive, vindictive father, Arthur (Jerry Stiller), who is prone toward bizarre conduct, lives with them. For his work on the eighth season, James was nominated for a Primetime Emmy Award for Outstanding Lead Actor in a Comedy Series in 2006.

James hosted the 2010 Nickelodeon Kids' Choice Awards on March 27, 2010. He was nominated to be the inaugural member of the "Arm Fart Hall of Fame" in the following year's show, with host Jack Black calling him Kevin "Not-Quite-As-Good-As-Me" James. He and fellow nominee Kaley Cuoco lost in fan voting to Josh Duhamel.

James starred in the sitcom Kevin Can Wait, which premiered on September 19, 2016. The series was renewed for a second season, before being canceled at the season's end.

In 2021, James released a new show on Netflix called The Crew. It was canceled after one season.

In 2024, Deadline reported that James is set to portray John Daly, in an upcoming series.

=== Film ===
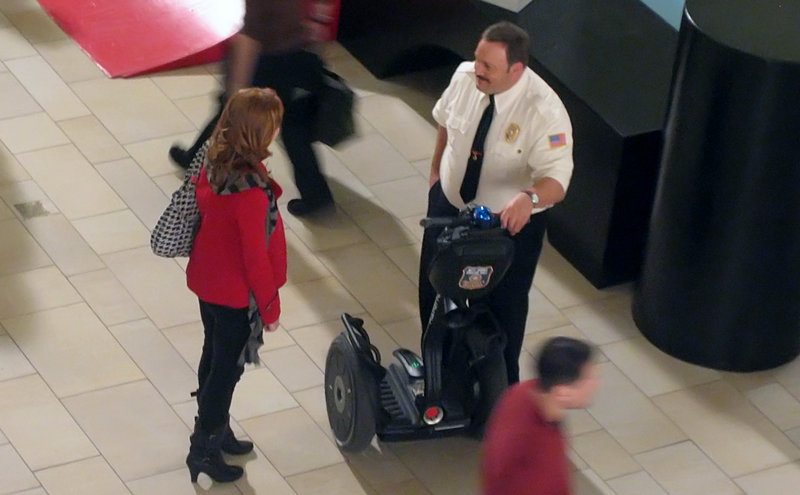
James on the set of Paul Blart: Mall Cop in 2008

After a cameo in 50 First Dates in 2004, James made his starring film debut in the 2005 romantic comedy Hitch, alongside Will Smith and Eva Mendes. In 2006, he co-starred with his Everybody Loves Raymond colleague Ray Romano in the straight-to-video comedy Grilled, and provided voice work in the animated films Monster House and Barnyard, released on July 21 and August 4, respectively, of that year. James co-starred with Adam Sandler in the comedies I Now Pronounce You Chuck & Larry (2007) and You Don't Mess with the Zohan (2008), and starred in the Sandler-produced comedy Paul Blart: Mall Cop (2009). The latter film opened as the No. 1 film in North America with a weekend gross of $39 million, despite overwhelmingly negative reviews, and eventually grossed $219 million from ticket and home video sales. James also appeared in Grown Ups (2010), which co-starred numerous Saturday Night Live alumni and was even more universally panned, yet was highly successful at the box office and led to two sequels in 2013 and 2027.

In 2011, he had a lead role with Vince Vaughn in the comedy-drama The Dilemma and then with Rosario Dawson in Zookeeper, which he wrote and produced. James also had the lead role in the 2012 mixed martial arts comedy film Here Comes the Boom. He again provided voice work in the first three films of the Hotel Transylvania franchise (2012–2018). He starred as well in the movies Little Boy and Pixels (both 2015), and the following year in True Memoirs of an International Assassin, directed by Jeff Wadlow and released by Netflix on November 11, 2016. In 2017, James co-starred with Adam Sandler in another Netflix film, Sandy Wexler.

James had a lead dramatic role in the 2020 thriller film Becky. He starred as NFL head coach Sean Payton in the 2022 biographical film Home Team. Since 2024, James has mostly appeared in comedy films, including Guns Up, Playdate and Solo Mio.

=== Other work ===
In 2007, he was the grand marshal for the Pepsi 400 promoting I Now Pronounce You Chuck & Larry and saying "I just got three things to say: God bless our troops, God bless America and gentlemen, start your engines". He did it again in June 2010 with friend and fellow actor Adam Sandler to promote Grown Ups, in 2012 at the fall Talladega race to promote Here Comes the Boom, and in July 2013 at the Coke-Zero 400 with co-stars Sandler and Shaquille O'Neal to promote Grown Ups 2. Both the 2007 Pepsi 400 command and June 2010 command at Michigan with Sandler have since been voted as two of the best and most memorable NASCAR commands in history by fans.

A web series titled Dusty Peacock produced by James and starring his brother Gary Valentine began streaming on Crackle in July 2009.

In February 2020, James revived his YouTube channel which he had launched back on November 27, 2017, featuring short films "based on thin premises, like James eagerly waiting for a green light, misreading a hand wave, or spending birthdays by himself, but many carry a sense of melancholy and restraint." By June 2020, he had over 535,000 subscribers and 28 million total views.

== Personal life ==
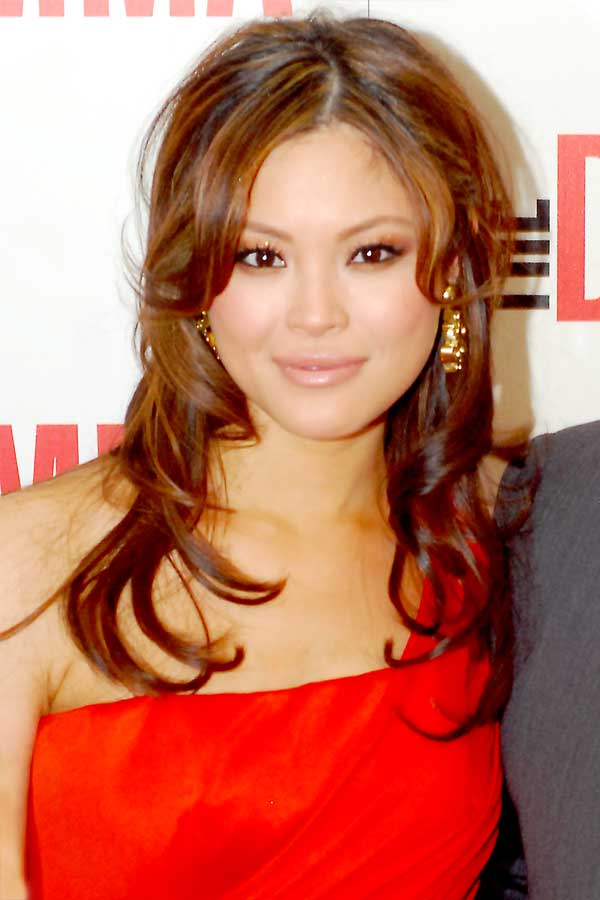
James's wife Steffiana de la Cruz in 2011

James met Filipina-American model and actress Steffiana de la Cruz as part of a blind date, and they were married on June 19, 2004. They have four children together and reside in California.

Raised in a Catholic home, James stated in 2012 that he remains a devout Catholic. In 2019, he hosted a Catholic retreat featuring priest Chad Ripperger and theologian Scott Hahn. In a 2024 interview on The Joe Rogan Experience, he revealed that he fasted for 41.5 consecutive days, only subsisting on water containing salt all throughout, losing over 60 pounds. He did this out of religious devotion when one of his daughters was diagnosed with a neurobehavioral disorder.

James is a fan of the New York Mets baseball team and threw out the first pitch at a game in August 2024.

== Filmography ==
Key
†	Denotes films that have not yet been released

=== Film ===
Year	Title	Role	Notes
2002	Pinocchio	Mangiafuoco	English voice
2004	50 First Dates	Factory Worker	
2005	Hitch	Albert	
2006	Grilled	Dave	Direct-to-video
2006	Monster House	Officer Landers	Voice and motion capture
2006	Barnyard	Otis	Voice
2007	I Now Pronounce You Chuck & Larry	Firefighter Larry Valentine	
2008	You Don't Mess with the Zohan	Himself	Uncredited cameo
2009	Paul Blart: Mall Cop	Paul Blart	Also writer and producer
2010	Grown Ups	Eric Lamonsoff	
2011	The Dilemma	Nick	
2011	Zookeeper	Griffin Keyes	Also writer and producer
2012	Here Comes the Boom	Scott Voss	Also writer and producer
2012	Hotel Transylvania	Frankenstein	Voice
2013	Grown Ups 2	Eric Lamonsoff	
2015	Paul Blart: Mall Cop 2	Paul Blart	Also writer and producer
2015	Little Boy	Dr. Fox	
2015	Pixels	President William Cooper	
2015	Hotel Transylvania 2	Frankenstein	Voice
2016	True Memoirs of an International Assassin	Sam Larson	
2017	Sandy Wexler	Ted	
2018	Hotel Transylvania 3: Summer Vacation	Frankenstein	Voice
2020	Becky	Dom	
2020	Hubie Halloween	Steve Downey	
2022	Home Team	Sean Payton	Also producer
2024	Monster Summer	Edgar Palmer	
2025	Guns Up	Ray Hayes	
2025	Playdate	Brian Jennings	
2026	Solo Mio	Matt Taylor	also writer
TBA	Grown Ups 3	Eric Lamonsoff	Filming

=== Television ===
Year	Title	Role	Notes
1994–1997	A&E's An Evening at the Improv	Himself	7 episodes
1996, 1998–1999	Everybody Loves Raymond	Kevin Daniels / Doug Heffernan	8 episodes
1998–2007	The King of Queens	Doug Heffernan	Lead role (207 episodes)
1998	Cosby	Doug Heffernan	Episode: "Judgment Day"
1999	Becker	Doug Heffernan	Episode: "Drive, They Said"
1999	Martial Law	Kevin Hampton	Episode: "Nitro Man"
2001	Arli$$	Kevin	Episode: "Like No Business I Know"
2007	Elmo's Christmas Countdown	Santa Claus / Kevin	TV special
2015	Liv and Maddie	Mr. Kevin Clodfelter	Episode: "Cook-a-Rooney"
2016–2018	Kevin Can Wait	Kevin Gable	Lead role (48 episodes)
2021	The Crew	Kevin Gibson	Lead role (10 episodes)
2026	Untitled John Daly limited series †	John Daly	Lead role

=== Stand-up specials ===
Year	Title	Notes
2001	Sweat the Small Stuff	
2018	Never Don't Give Up	
2024	Irregardless	

=== Music Videos ===
Year	Title	Artist	Role	Notes
2025	"Nobody Likes Your Girlfriend"	Nate Smith & Hardy	Best Friend	

== Accolades ==
=== Teen Choice Awards ===
Year	Nominated work	Category	Result	Ref.
2005	Hitch	Choice Movie: Dance Scene^{[A]}	Nominated	
2005	Hitch	Choice Movie: Liplock^{[A]}	Nominated	
2015	Paul Blart: Mall Cop 2	Choice Movie Actor: Comedy	Nominated	

=== Primetime Emmy Awards ===
Year	Nominated work	Category	Result	Ref.
2006	The King of Queens; episode: "Pole Lox"	Outstanding Lead Actor in a Comedy Series	Nominated	

=== Golden Raspberry Awards ===
Year	Nominated work	Category	Result	Ref.
2008	I Now Pronounce You Chuck & Larry	Worst Supporting Actor	Nominated	
2008	I Now Pronounce You Chuck & Larry	Worst Screen Couple^{[B]}	Nominated	
2014	Grown Ups 2	Worst Screen Combo^{[C]}	Nominated	
2016	Paul Blart: Mall Cop 2	Worst Actor	Nominated	
2016	Paul Blart: Mall Cop 2	Worst Picture	Nominated	
2016	Paul Blart: Mall Cop 2	Worst Screenplay	Nominated	
2016	Pixels	Worst Supporting Actor	Nominated	

=== People's Choice Awards ===
Year	Nominated work	Category	Result	Ref.
2017	Kevin Can Wait	Favorite Actor in a New TV Series	Nominated	

== Notes ==
A Shared with Will Smith
B Shared with Adam Sandler and Jessica Biel
C Shared with the entire cast
