= Larry Romano =

American actor (born 1963)

- Born: Lawrence John Romano; July 31, 1963 (age 62); Mount Vernon, New York, U.S.
- Occupation: Actor
- Years active: 1987–present
- Relatives: Carmine Giovinazzo (cousin)

Lawrence John Romano (born July 31, 1963) is an American film and television actor. Born in Mount Vernon, New York, he was a regular on NYPD Blue and the sitcom The King of Queens, on which he played Richie Iannucci. He played First Base in the motion picture Lock Up. He had a lead role in the NBC sitcom Kristin as Aldo Bonnadonna; the short-lived sitcom aired only six episodes before being canceled.

Romano made a minor appearance in Out for Justice. In 1996, he played Tino Zapatti in the film City Hall and played a minor role in the film Sleepers. In 1997, he had a brief role playing opposite Al Pacino in the role of Benjamin "Lefty" Ruggerio's son in Donnie Brasco, and appeared in the 1998 Terrence Malick film The Thin Red Line. He also appeared in the 2010 film The Ascent, as well as in the 2015 film Laugh Killer Laugh.

== Early life and education ==
Romano was born Lawrence John Romano on July 31, 1963, in Mount Vernon, New York. He is of Italian-American descent. Romano studied acting at the Lee Strasberg Theatre and Film Institute (originally the Lee Strasberg Theatre Institute), HB Studios and Method and Miesner. He studied screenwriting and playwright work with Ron Peterson, Stuart Brown, and Richard Walter.

Romano began his acting career appearing in local New York Off Broadway plays. He received his Screen Actors Guild (SAG) card on Ridley Scott's Black Rain. Romano played the minor role of Joe Zeppi. Romano portrayed Madonna's boyfriend in the music video "Oh Father." Larry is not related to Ray Romano of Everybody Loves Raymond fame.

== Music career ==
In the early 1990s, Romano formed the Rock Band "DEFICIT" with friends from the Bronx. He wrote and recorded the song "Rock in the Bronx" which was aired by the local TV station Madison Square Garden Network. The introduction to both videos is by New York Yankee broadcaster, Mel Allen. "Rock in the Bronx" was the No. 1 most requested song on NYC Radio Station Z-100 in 1993.

== Filmography ==
Year	Title	Role	Notes
1987	On Time	FedEx Driver	Short
1989	She's Back	Howling Punk	
1989	Lock Up	'First Base' Pena	
1991	Out for Justice	Sales Clerk	
1992	Civil Wars	Unknown	Episode: "Mob Psychology"
1993	L.A. Law	Bobby Falcone	Episode: "F.O.B."
1993	New York Cop	Emilio	
1993–1994	NYPD Blue	Richie Catena / Marino's Underling	5 episodes
1995	Mad About You	Vinnie	Episode: "My Boyfriend's Back!"
1996	Public Morals	Richie Biondi	13 episodes
1996	City Hall	Tino Zapatti	
1996	Love Is All There Is	Waiter #1	
1996	Vibrations	Tough Guy #1	Video
1996	Sleepers	Man #2	
1996	No Way Home	Carter	
1996	Bullet	Frankie	
1997	Donnie Brasco	Tommy Ruggiero	
1998	The Thin Red Line	Private Mazzi	
1998–2001	The King of Queens	Richie Iannucci	43 episodes
2001	Kristin	Aldo Bonnadonna	13 episodes
2001	18 Shades of Dust	Jimmy 'The Pope'	
2002	Turnaround	Danny Russo	
2002	What I Like About You	Leo	Episode: "Thanksgiving"
2003	Spanish Fly	John	
2003	Fish Without a Bicycle	Antonio	
2006	CSI: NY	Louie Messer	Episode: "Run Silent, Run Deep"
2006	The War at Home	Maintenance Guy	Episode: "Super Dave"
2008	Bald	Mr. Herman	
2008	Baggage	Unknown	Video short
2010	The Ascent	Terry	
2014	Karma	Billy DiLeonardo	Short
2015	Laugh Killer Laugh	Vinny	
2016	Oiled Up	Detective Paul	Short
2019	The Irishman	Phil Testa	
2019	Bad Education	Cousin Larry	

Key
†	Denotes films that have not yet been released
