= Ted Cooper =

American TV scenic designer (1920–1999)

- Born: November 11, 1920
- Died: December 5, 1999 (aged 79); Sherman Oaks, California, U.S.
- Occupations: Production Designer and Creative Consultant
- Years active: 1949–1999
- Known for: television game shows

Edward Theodore Cooper (November 11, 1920 – December 5, 1999) was a long-time United States television scenic designer and creative consultant. Cooper is best known as the production designer and creative consultant for Mark Goodson-Bill Todman Productions, the leading producer of American TV game shows. He joined the firm in 1960 and was associated with it until his death at age 79.

Cooper was hired as a TV art director for NBC in 1949 where he worked on various shows, including Your Show of Shows, The Martin and Lewis Show (until it moved to Los Angeles), The Paul Winchell and Jerry Mahoney Show, The Jimmy Durante show and the game shows Haggis Baggis and Charge Account, among others. Through his association with NBC he knew Fred Rogers of Mr. Rogers Neighborhood fame and contributed to the first version of that show. He was also responsible for the sets for the 1956 Orson Welles Broadway production of King Lear which lasted for only 21 performances.

Cooper's best-known achievements were in creating set designs and game displays for TV quiz shows. He is credited with being the motivating force behind taking game shows from a simple table set in front of a drape to a full set designed for the show. The Goodson-Todman shows for which Cooper served as art director or creative consultant after 1960 include The Price Is Right, The Match Game (including The Match Game-Hollywood Squares Hour), What's My Line?, I've Got a Secret, To Tell the Truth, He Said, She Said (and its successor Tattletales), Family Feud, Beat the Clock, Password (and its revivals Password Plus and Super Password), Say When!!, the Jack Narz and Alex Trebek revivals of Concentration, Double Dare, Card Sharks, Mindreaders, The Better Sex, Now You See It, Blockbusters, Child's Play, Body Language, and Trivia Trap, as well as assorted pilots. In addition to being the scenic designer of Say When!!, he was also the associate producer of that show. Cooper's design for "Say When" was among the first uses of alpha-numeric electronic readouts on TV and in the U.S., and helped the Split-flap display to become so popular for a time on TV and in other venues. Cooper's designs typically included technology not only for displaying numbers and letters, but also technology for controlling electromechanical devices such as lights and sound effects. Most of his designs were executed without the benefit of computer-generated special effects for which the industry is known today, but one of his shows, Classic Concentration, was one of the earliest shows to implement its game board on a fully computerized display. Many of his sets utilized rotating elements: Family Feud, Match Game, Card Sharks and The Price Is Right with its well-known turntable. Game show producer Dan Enright, whose shows competed with those of Goodson-Todman, once referred to Cooper as "Mark Goodson's secret weapon".

For the 1958 Barry and Enright game show Concentration, which aired on NBC for 15 years before moving into syndication, he created the display that showed the list of prizes as the contestants matched them. The display did not show a stagehand slipping in the name of the prize on the side, but rather had the prize name in place obscured by a sliding front cover which would then be pulled to the side to reveal the prize name. For the syndicated version of Concentration, Cooper devised the "Head Start" feature in which four prizes were revealed prior to the start of the game. The prizes revealed were "fee items" for which the producers received a fee for being plugged on the show. "Head Start" guaranteed that the copy for those fee items was read and the fee collected regardless of whether or not the prizes were won during the game. For the 1972 version of The Price Is Right Cooper created the pricing games Any Number and Range Game. The physical game devices and other set pieces used on that version of the show prior to 2000 were designed by Cooper himself or under his supervision.

Cooper designed the psychedelic set for the 1969 syndicated revival of To Tell the Truth. The brightly colored panels and elegant lettering he supervised for the show's set in the Ed Sullivan Theater in New York gave a modern, youthful feel to a show that had already been a success for 12 years on CBS.

Cooper was a gold card member of IATSE Local 829, the United Scenic Artists, and for several years until his retirement was the oldest working member of that union.

== Selected credits ==
=== Television ===
- All-Star Review (1953)
- The Children's Corner (1955-1956)
- The Jimmy Durante Show (1954-1957)
- The Colgate Comedy Hour (1950-1951)
- The Paul Winchell Show (1950-1956)
- Startime (1959)
- Sunday Showcase (1959)
- Your Show of Shows (1950-1954)

=== Game shows ===
- Beat the Clock (1969-1970, 1979-1980)
- The Better Sex (1977-1978)
- Blockbusters (1980-1982, 1987)
- Body Language (1984-1986)
- Card Sharks (1978-1981, 1986-1989)
- Child's Play (1982-1983)
- Classic Concentration (1987-1991)
- Concentration (1958-1960, 1973-1978)
- Double Dare (1976-1977)
- Dough Re Mi (1958-1960)
- Family Feud (1976-1985, 1988-1995)
- Haggis Baggis (1958-1959)
- He Said, She Said (1969-1970)
- High-Low (1957)
- I've Got a Secret (1972-1973, 1976)
- The Jan Murray Show (Charge Account) (1960)
- Laugh Line (1959)
- The Match Game (1962, 1973-1982)
- The Match Game-Hollywood Squares Hour (1983-1984)
- Mindreaders (1979-1980)
- Now You See It (1974-1975, 1989)
- Password (1961-1963, 1971-1975)
- Password Plus (1979-1982)
- The Price Is Right (1972-1999)
- Say When!! (1961-1965)
- Showoffs (1975)
- Split Personality (1959-1960)
- Super Password (1984-1989)
- Tattletales (1974-1978, 1982-1984)
- Tic Tac Dough (1956-1959)
- To Tell the Truth (1969-1978, 1980–1981, 1990-1991)
- Trivia Trap (1984-1985)
- What's My Line? (1968-1975)

=== Broadway ===
- Texas, Li'l Darlin' (1949-1950)
- A Story for a Sunday Evening (1950)
- King Lear (1956)
