= Mark Goodson Productions =

American television production company

- Formerly: Goodson-Todman Productions (1946-1982)
- Type: Subsidiary
- Industry: Television
- Founded: May 1946; 80 years ago
- Founders: Mark Goodson; Bill Todman
- Defunct: 1996 (as separate company); 2002 (logo used on most shows, as in-name only subsidiary); 2007 (logo used on The Price is Right)
- Fate: Folded into Pearson Television in 1998, name and logo continued to be used until 2002 for most legacy properties and 2007 for The Price is Right, became a full in-name only subsidiary
- Headquarters: New York City, New York; Hollywood, California
- Products: Game shows
- Services: Television production
- Parent: All American Communications (1996-1998); Pearson Television (1998-2001)

Mark Goodson Productions (formerly Goodson-Todman Productions, also known as on-screen as Mark Goodson-Bill Todman Productions until 1982) is a television production company that was originally formed in 1946 by veteran radio producers Mark Goodson and Bill Todman specifically producing originally radio, later television programming. Bill Todman, the company's co-founder died in 1979, prompting a rename to Mark Goodson Productions in 1982.

It was first based in New York City, then relocated its main base to Hollywood in 1971 following the success of the ABC revival of Password. The company was sold to All American Communications in 1995, and now considered part of today's Fremantle.

== Background ==
In 1941, while working on the local quiz show, The Battle of the Boroughs, Mark Goodson, who at a time, a local freelance announcer, met Bill Todman, a radio writer, director, and advertising copywriter. "I was impressed that he was rich enough to live on Park Avenue and own a Buick," Goodson says. The two found a mutual love for games and decided to partner. "Mark had an idea for a show called Winner Takes All" Todman said. "I changed it to Winner Take All. We auditioned the show for $15 including breakfast at Longchamps. And we went our way. In 1946 I called Mark. 'I got a sale,' I told him. Winner Take All was on for three 15-minute periods a week and $150." The pair's first quiz show, 'Winner Take All', premiered on CBS radio in 1946. They would go on to create four local radio quizzes: Hit the Jackpot, Spin to Win, Rate Your Mate, and Time's a Wastin'.

== History ==
=== Goodson-Todman Productions (1946-1982) ===
==== Origins in New York ====
In 1948, after the success of these radio game shows, Goodson-Todman was solidifed as a packager and producer of game shows. Winner Take All used a lockout buzzer system and was the first quiz show to pit two contestants against each other. It was also the first to have winners return each week until they were defeated, these firsts would later become the normal for nearly all game shows. Winner Take All also became the first Goodson-Todman television show, debuting on Thursday, July 8, 1948 on the CBS Television Network.

What's My Line? soon followed on the same network, debuting on February 1, 1950. "Live television was like flying without a net," said Goodson. "We never knew what would happen. I remember Eddie Fisher as a mystery guest saying, 'Any rumors you hear that Elizabeth and I are breaking up are lies.' Another mystery guest, Judy Garland, had the show's staff chewing its nails when she wobbled in just before she was supposed to go on, with her hair in a riot of curlers, and promptly repaired to her dressing room. I was about to take her place," he continues, "when she came over to me and asked, 'How much time do we have?' I said, 'Fifteen seconds, Miss Garland,' and she replied, 'So what's the rush?' and walked onstage."

Quiz shows had been popular on radio through the 1940's, and they were just as popular with TV executives, thanks to costing little to produce and merchandise prizes were furnished for free by manufacturers in return for plugs. A well-known and oft-repeated story had Goodson and Todman carrying prizes for Winner Take All from their office to the studio, when Todman slipped sending small appliances clattering to the sidewalk. Writer Goodman Ace witnessed the accident and yelled, "Hey, Todman, you dropped your script!"

During his time, Goodson teamed up with orchestra leader Harry Salter and Biow Advertising copywriter Howard Connell to sell the program Stop the Music to radio, and the rest is history. The company came to hire more employees, many of them defected from networks and production companies. The first of these was Louis M. Sturner, who was the former CBS program sales coordinator in 1949, followed by John Coburn Turner in 1950.

During the success of these shows, the company brought its success with another smash hit, Beat the Clock, with host Bud Collyer, which was a staple on CBS for years. The company made its oversaturation and growth, from long-term hits like I've Got a Secret, To Tell the Truth, Password, The Price is Right and Family Feud to a series of flops like Missing Links, Snap Judgment, The Better Sex and Mindreaders, increasing its strength as the premium leader of game shows.

The company eventually evolved and became the number one leading premier game show producer throughout the 1950s, surpassing the likes of other game show producers like Ralph Edwards and Louis G. Cowan. The company's success leaned because of Goodson's sharp eye for production and presentation, and their strict insistence on maintaining clean, honest contests, thus allowing their shows to survive the quiz-show scandals of the late 1950s. After those scandals wiped out most of their competition, including Barry & Enright Productions and Entertainment Productions, two largest competitors to Goodson-Todman, much of the newer game-show output of the 1960s and 1970s came from either Goodson-Todman or companies launched by their former employees: Merv Griffin, Bob Stewart, Monty Hall, and later Jay Wolpert. Goodson-Todman was involved with Jack Barry's comeback vehicle The Joker's Wild for its 1969 pilot, but ended involvement with the show before it debuted in 1972 (coincidentally, on the same lineup as Goodson and Todman's own daytime game show comeback vehicle, The Price Is Right).

While Todman oversaw the company's lucrative businesses outside of television, Goodson handled the creative aspects of producing game shows. The people who worked for the company and created most of the Goodson-Todman shows were pivotal to the success of those shows. Goodson-Todman executives Bob Stewart, Bob Bach, Gil Fates, Ira Skutch, Frank Wayne, Chester Feldman, Paul Alter, Howard Felsher, Ted Cooper, Mimi O'Brien, Jay Wolpert, and others were instrumental in making the shows successful.

Goodson-Todman twice sold two game shows to CBS, one in 1958 for What's My Line?, and one in 1960 with Garry Moore (as Telecast Enterprises) for I've Got a Secret, although both shows continue to employ Goodson-Todman's talent and production staff. Both shows eventually got bought back by Goodson-Todman around the 1970s, although I've Got a Secret was sold to The Carsey-Werner Company in 1992.

The company proved itself to be masterful at games, but was not as successful when it tried other fields of television programs, including the anthology dramas The Web and The Richard Boone Show, a talk-variety show for famed insult comic Don Rickles – and what was possibly the company's biggest failure, a sitcom titled One Happy Family. By 1957, Goodson-Todman set up a Hollywood office that was utilized for film production.

Goodson-Todman Productions was also involved with three Westerns: Jefferson Drum (1958–59), starring Jeff Richards as a newspaper editor in the Old West; The Rebel (1959–1961), starring Nick Adams as a former Confederate soldier who traveled to the West after the American Civil War (Johnny Cash sang the theme); and Branded, starring Chuck Connors as a soldier who had wrongly been given a dishonorable discharge from the Army. "They wanted to expand their horizons; nobody wants to be pigeonholed," says Andrew J. Fenady, who produced the westerns with them. Todman was an avid rider and a western fan, and where the shows were concerned, "You could talk to him any time," Fenady says "He was there if we needed something. And the Goodson-Todman accounting was impeccable. We never went over budget, and we made a lot of money from their honest bookkeeping. They were very, very fair-minded partners."

In 1962, Goodson and Todman met Australian game show producer Reg Grundy, gaining him the Australian rights to most of G-T programmes, starting with Say When!!, and then gave themselves the rights to most of its programs outside of USA and continental Europe in 1976, and then full exclusive rights to its programming and formats outside of USA and continental Europe in 1992 such as in Australia and others.

When CBS cancelled game shows in 1967, including the big series What's My Line?, To Tell the Truth, I've Got a Secret and Password, Goodson-Todman was left in a weaker state for five years, due to competition from rising game show producers, namely Ralph Andrews Productions, Heatter-Quigley Productions, Hatos-Hall Productions, Chuck Barris Productions and Bob Stewart Productions. During the company's weak years, the company revived most of these series for syndication, including Beat the Clock, which was originated in New York, but moved to Montreal in 1970 to save money.

==== Move to Hollywood ====
For many years, the company was headquartered in the Seagram Building at 375 Park Avenue in New York City. Most of the company's production moved to Hollywood in the early 1970s (as did many other production companies), starting with the ABC revival of Password in 1971. The Los Angeles offices were based at 6430 Sunset Boulevard, moving to 5750 Wilshire Boulevard. The company's last New York-based show was the 1980 version of To Tell the Truth, but the New York office remained open and was used for East Coast Child's Play auditions.

In 1972, the company hit their turning point, when CBS revived The Price is Right, which was still on the air today, as well as syndicated game show I've Got a Secret. The success of The Price is Right allowed to thrive and regain the producing top spot, surpassing the likes of its competitors Heatter-Quigley Productions, Hatos-Hall Productions, Chuck Barris Productions and Bob Stewart Productions. The company next followed it up in 1973 by Match Game, and in 1974 by Now You See It and Tattletales, regaining the dominance of Goodson-Todman. The company also produced a syndicated version of the hit game show Concentration, licensed from NBC, and it was hosted by Jack Narz.

In 1976, the company made another smash hit in the Hollywood office, by launching another hit series, Family Feud, for ABC. Besides the series, the company delieved other flops, namely Showoffs, Double Dare, The Better Sex and Mindreaders. By early 1978 Goodson-Todman was producing 10 shows on 3 different networks.

In 1978, in an attempt to bolster NBC's daytime lineup following the failures of low-rent product by Bob Stewart, Chuck Barris, Lin Bolen, Ralph Andrews, Ralph Edwards and Heatter-Quigley, and in an effort to boost and counter the success and viewership of NBC's other hit game show from Merv Griffin called Wheel of Fortune, Goodson-Todman decided to sell their series to NBC for the first time since the cancellation of The Match Game in 1969, called Card Sharks, which was hosted by Jim Perry and became a success on NBC. This partnership was followed up by another smash hit on NBC, called Password Plus, which was a revival and updated version of Password, which was initially hosted by Allen Ludden.

Also in 1978, the company struck a deal with Fremantle International to represent worldwide sales of the company's library in the European markets.

=== Mark Goodson Productions (1982-1998) ===
The Goodson-Todman partnership continued until Todman's death in 1979, after which Goodson acquired the Todman heirs' share of the company, and in 1982 the company was renamed Mark Goodson Productions. The last shows overseen by Todman before he died was Mindreaders on NBC and a revival of Beat the Clock on CBS.

The 1980s and 1990s saw a slow down in production and success for the first time since the company was started. The company initially started off a bit strong with Blockbusters, a minor hit show on NBC and gained a following in the UK, and also the final new production with the Goodson-Todman Productions name and branding. The company then followed it up with their first new production with the Mark Goodson Productions name, branding and logo, Child's Play, which aired on CBS and it flopped, although it had a following internationally. The company next made a ratings disaster for NBC, Match Game-Hollywood Squares Hour, which changed the rules of Hollywood Squares slightly at insistence of Mark Goodson.

The company attempted to break into the Canadian market after Beat the Clock concluded in 1974 by launching Claim to Fame on the CTV Television Network in 1982, but it didn't last long.

The company rebounded in 1984 with a revival of the ABC flop Showoffs on CBS, called Body Language, followed in 1984 by a revival of Password Plus under the new name Super Password, and the company's final new show based on an original IP, called Trivia Trap, which debuted on ABC in 1984 and it was also short-lived. The company next spent a few years developing unsold pilots, and revivals of old Goodson-Todman properties. TKO is the latest Goodson creation based on an original IP.

Mark Goodson died in 1992, and his son Jonathan Goodson took over the company. He decided to start a lottery division under Jonathan Goodson's watch, with the first being Illinois' Instant Riches, and roll out into other states. In 1993, the company partnered with Paramount Domestic Television to launch a nighttime version of The Price is Right, which flopped after one season in 1994.

In 1995, the company was sold to the Interpublic Group of Companies and All American Communications, with the exception of the lottery show properties, which was transferred to Jonathan Goodson Productions. Interpublic's stake was sold to All American in 1996. Robert Noah, formerly of Reg Grundy Productions, was hired to run the Goodson library and the company attempted to sell with Tribune Broadcasting revivals of most of the company's library. In 1997, All American was sold to Pearson Television, which Pearson accelerated the process of selling the Goodson library, and Noah later left the company.

Today, the company is now an in-name only unit of Fremantle. The traces of Goodson were removed in 2002 from most shows such as Family Feud, mainly after Richard Karn took over as host, followed five years later in 2007 by the removal of the Goodson logo from The Price is Right after Drew Carey took over as host.

== Programs ==
=== Radio shows ===
Title	Year	Network	Notes
Winner Take All	1946-1952	CBS	
Stop the Music	1948-1952; 1954-1955	ABC; CBS	co-production with Louis G. Cowan, Inc.
Hit the Jackpot	1948-1950	CBS	Originally known as Try 'n' Stop Me and Catch Me If You Can
Beat the Clock	1948-1949	CBS	Originally known as Time's a Wastin
Spin to Win	1949	CBS	
Rate Your Mate	1950-1951	CBS	
What's My Line?	1952-1953	NBC; CBS	
Two for the Money	1952-1956	NBC; CBS	

=== Television shows ===
Title	Year	Network	Notes
Winner Take All	1948-1952	CBS; NBC	
Stop the Music	1949-1952; 1954-1956	ABC	co-production with Louis G. Cowan, Inc.
The Web	1950-1954	CBS	
By Popular Demand	1950	CBS	
What's My Line?	1950-1975	CBS; Syndication	1958-1967 episodes co-produced by CBS Productions; Distributed by CBS Enterprises/Viacom (1968-1975)
Beat the Clock	1950-1961; 1969-1974; 1979-1980	CBS; ABC; Syndication	Copyrighted as Clock Productions (1969-1974) and The Clock Company (1979-1980); Distributed by 20th Century Fox Television (1969-1972) and Firestone Film Syndication (1972-1974)
It's News to Me	1951-1954	CBS	
The Name's the Same	1951-1955	ABC	
Two for the Money	1952-1957	NBC; CBS	
I've Got a Secret	1952-1967; 1972-1973; 1976	CBS; Syndication	1960-1967 episodes produced by Telecast Enterprises; Distributed by Firestone Film Syndication (1972-1973)
Judge for Yourself	1953-1954	NBC	
What's Going On	1954	ABC	
Make the Connection	1955	NBC	
Choose Up Sides	1956	NBC	
The Price is Right	1956-1965	NBC; ABC	copyrighted as Marbil Productions
To Tell the Truth	1956-1978; 1980-1981; 1990-1991; 2000-2002	CBS; Syndication; NBC	Copyrighted as The Truth Company (1980-1981) and The TTTT Co. (1990-1991); Distributed by Firestone Film Syndication (1969-1978), Viacom Enterprises (1980-1981) and Pearson Television (2000-2002); 1956-1981 iterations produced under Goodson-Todman name 1990 and 2000 iterations produced under Mark Goodson Productions name
The Web	1957	NBC	co-production with Screen Gems
Goodyear Theatre	1957-1960	NBC	
Play Your Hunch	1958-1963	CBS; ABC; NBC	
Jefferson Drum	1958	NBC	
The Rebel	1959-1961	ABC	
Split Personality	1959-1960	NBC	
Philip Marlowe	1959-1960	ABC	co-production with California National Productions
Number Please	1961	ABC	
One Happy Family	1961	NBC	
Say When!!	1961-1965	NBC	
Password/Password Plus/Super Password	1961-1967; 1971-1975; 1979-1982; 1984-1989	CBS; ABC; NBC	Copyrighted as Peak Productions (1961-1967, 1971-1975), The Password Company (1979-1982) and The Super Password Company (1984-1989); Password and Password Plus produced under Goodson-Todman name Super Password produced under Mark Goodson Productions name
Match Game	1962-1969; 1973-1982; 1990-1991; 1998-1999	NBC; CBS; Syndication; ABC	copyrighted as Sojurn Productions (1962-1969), Celebrity Productions (1973-1981), The Match Game Company (1981-1982) and The MG Company (1990-1991); 1962-1982 iterations produced under the Goodson-Todman name 1990-1991 and 1998-1999 iterations produced under the Mark Goodson Productions name Distributed by Jim Victory Television (1975-1982) and Pearson Television (1998-1999),
Missing Links	1963-1964	NBC; ABC	
The Richard Boone Show	1963-1964	NBC	
Get the Message	1964	ABC	
Call My Bluff	1965	NBC	
Branded	1965-1966	NBC	co-production with Sentinel Productions
Snap Judgment	1967-1969	NBC	
The Don Rickles Show	1968-1969	ABC	
He Said, She Said	1969-1970	Syndication	
The Price is Right	1972-present	CBS; Syndication	copyrighted as Price Productions (1972-1994) and The Price is Right Productions (2003-present); 1972-1984 iterations produced under the Goodson-Todman name 1984-2007 iterations produced under the Mark Goodson Productions name dropped the Goodson logo in 2007; Distributed by Viacom Enterprises (1972-1980), The Television Program Source (1985-1986) and Paramount Domestic Television (1994-1995)
Concentration/Classic Concentration	1973-1978; 1987-1991	Syndication; NBC	format licensed from NBC, who owns the rights since 1958 copyrighted as The Concentration Company (1987-1991) distributed by Victory Television
Tattletales	1974-1978; 1982-1984	CBS; Syndication	copyrighted as Panel Productions (1974-1978) and The Tattletales Company (1982-1984) revival of He Said, She Said distributed by Firestone Program Syndication Co. (1977-1978)
Now You See It	1974-1975; 1989	CBS	copyrighted as Suzanne Productions (1974-1975) and The Now You See It Company (1984-1985)
Showoffs	1975	ABC	
Family Feud	1976-1985; 1988-1995; 1999-present	ABC; CBS; Syndication	copyrighted as The Family Company (1976-1985), The New Family Company (1988-1995) and Feudin' Productions (1999-2010); Distributed by Viacom Enterprises (1977-1985), LBS Communications (1988-1992), All-American Television (1992-1995) and Pearson Television (1999-2002); 1976-1982 iterations produced under the Goodson-Todman name 1982-2002 iterations produced the Mark Goodson Productions name dropped the Goodson logo in 2002
Double Dare	1976-1977	CBS	copyrighted as Suzanne Productions
The Better Sex	1977-1978	ABC	copyrighted as Strong Productions
All-Star Family Feud Special	1978-1984	ABC	copyrighted as The Family Company
Card Sharks	1978-1991; 1986-1989; 2001-2002	NBC; CBS; Syndication	copyrighted as Suzanne Productions (1978-1979), MG Productions (1979-1981) and The Card Sharks Company (1986-1989); Distributed by The Television Program Source (1986-1987) and Pearson Television (2001-2002)
Mindreaders	1979-1980	NBC	copyrighted as The Mindreaders Company
That's My Line	1980-1981	CBS	copyrighted as T.M.L. Productions
Blockbusters	1980-1982; 1987	NBC	1980-1982 version is the last new one in the United States to use the Goodson-Todman Productions name copyrighted as The Blockbusters Company (1980-1982) and The B.B. Co (1987)
Claim to Fame	1982-1983	CTV	Last new production to use the Goodson-Todman Productions name co-production with Carleton Productions
Child's Play	1982-1983	CBS	First new production to use the Mark Goodson Productions name copyrighted as The Child's Play Company
Match Game/Hollywood Squares Hour	1983-1984	NBC	co-production with Orion Television copyrighted as The MG-HS Company
Body Language	1984-1986	CBS	a revival of Showoffs copyrighted as The Body Language Company
Trivia Trap	1984-1985	ABC	copyrighted as The Trivia Trap Company
Illinois Instant Riches	1994-1995	Syndication/WGN	continued by Jonathan Goodson Productions
Bonus Bonanza	1995	Syndication (Massachusetts only)	continued by Jonathan Goodson Productions
Flamingo Fortune	1995	Syndication (Florida only)	continued by Jonathan Goodson Productions

=== Unsold pilots ===
- Beat the Clock (1949 TV adaptation of the radio show)
- Rate Your Mate (1951 TV adaptation of the radio show)
- Choose Up Sides (1953)
- Take Your Choice (1954)
- Play for Keeps! (1955)
- The Great Challenge (1956)
- Nothing But the Truth (1956, the original version of To Tell the Truth)
- Number Please (1958)
- Las Vegas Beat (1961)
- Make Your Move (1964)
- It Had to Be You (1966, the original version of He Said She Said later Tattletales)
- Make the Scene (1969)
- It's Predictable (1970)
- Mindreaders (1975; completely unrelated to the 1979-80 format)
- Spell Binders (1978)
- Puzzlers (1980)
- Star Words (1983)
- Concentration (1985)
- Now You See It (1985)
- Oddball (1986)
- On a Roll (1986)
- TKO (1989)
- Body Talk {unsold remake of Showoffs & Body Language} (1990)
- Classic Concentration II (1992, never got past runthrough stage)
- Cash Tornado (1993)
- Card Sharks (1996)
- MG2 (The Match Game) (1996)

=== Feature films ===
Title	Release date	Distributor	Notes
Ride Beyond Vengeance	January 1966	Columbia Pictures	co-production with Andrew J. Fenady Productions and Sentinel Productions
Come Back to the 5 & Dime, Jimmy Dean, Jimmy Dean	November 12, 1982	Cinecom International Films	co-production with Sandcastle 5 Productions and Viacom Enterprises
