= Password Plus and Super Password =

American television game shows

Password Plus
- Genre: Game show
- Created by: Bob Stewart
- Developed by: Robert Sherman
- Directed by: George Choderker
- Presented by: Allen Ludden; Bill Cullen; Tom Kennedy
- Announcer: Gene Wood; Rich Jeffries; Johnny Olson; Bob Hilton; John Harlan
- Theme music composer: Score Productions
- Country of origin: United States
- No. of episodes: 801 (1 unaired)

Production
- Executive producer: Howard Felsher
- Producer: Robert Sherman
- Production locations: NBC Studios; Burbank, California
- Camera setup: Multi-camera
- Running time: 22 minutes
- Production company: Mark Goodson-Bill Todman Productions

Original release
- Network: NBC
- Release: January 8, 1979 – March 26, 1982

Related
- Password (1961–1967, 1971–1975); Super Password (1984–1989); Million Dollar Password (2008–2009)

Super Password
- Genre: Game show
- Created by: Bob Stewart
- Directed by: George Choderker
- Presented by: Bert Convy
- Announcer: Rich Jeffries; Gene Wood
- Theme music composer: Score Productions
- Country of origin: United States
- No. of episodes: 1,151

Production
- Executive producers: Chester Feldman; Robert Sherman; Howard Felsher
- Producers: Diane H. Janaver; Joe Neustein
- Production locations: NBC Studios; Burbank, California
- Camera setup: Multi-camera
- Running time: 22 minutes
- Production company: Mark Goodson Productions

Original release
- Network: NBC
- Release: September 24, 1984 – March 24, 1989

Related
- Password (1961–1967, 1971–1975); Password Plus (1979–1982); Million Dollar Password (2008–2009)

Password Plus and Super Password are American TV game shows that aired separately between 1979 and 1989. Both shows were revivals of Password, which originally ran from 1961 to 1975 in various incarnations. With only subtle differences between them, both Password Plus and Super Password retained the format of play as their predecessor, with two teams of two people each—a celebrity and a contestant—attempting to guess a mystery word using only one-word clues. New features included a series of five passwords as clues to an overarching puzzle for the teams to solve, as well as a bonus round requiring the winning team to guess ten passwords under a time limit to win a cash jackpot. Password Plus was originally hosted by Allen Ludden, who hosted all prior versions of Password; he departed from the show in 1980 and was replaced by Bill Cullen and then by Tom Kennedy. Bert Convy was the sole host of Super Password. Both shows had Gene Wood as the primary announcer.

Password Plus and Super Password aired on NBC, and were taped on Stage 3 at NBC Studios in Burbank, California. Password Plus was a Mark Goodson-Bill Todman Production and Super Password was a Mark Goodson Production. Password Plus aired from January 8, 1979, to March 26, 1982, for 801 episodes. The program also won a Daytime Emmy Award for Outstanding Game Show in 1982. Super Password aired for 1,151 episodes from September 24, 1984, to March 24, 1989.

== Cast ==
=== Hosts ===
Password Plus was hosted by original Password host Allen Ludden from its debut until April 1980, when he took a leave of absence after being diagnosed with stomach cancer. Bill Cullen, who at the time was hosting the show that preceded Password Plus on NBC, Chain Reaction, filled in until Ludden returned a month later. Ludden left the program again in late October 1980 due to further health problems and was replaced by Tom Kennedy. (By this time, Cullen was hosting Blockbusters, another Goodson-Todman production also airing on NBC.) Ludden made no further television appearances before his death on June 9, 1981, and Kennedy hosted the remainder of the series.

Bert Convy was the host for the entire run of Super Password.

=== Announcers ===
Gene Wood was the regular announcer on both Password Plus and Super Password. Johnny Olson, Bob Hilton, John Harlan, and Rich Jeffries substituted for Wood on different occasions on Password Plus.

Jeffries was the announcer for the first nine weeks of Super Password; he was replaced by Wood on November 26, 1984. Jeffries and Hilton occasionally substituted for Wood.

== Gameplay ==
=== Main game ===
The rules for Password Plus and Super Password are almost identical. As on the parent show Password, two teams, each composed of a celebrity and a contestant, attempt to convey a mystery word or "password" to each other by giving single-word clues. Invalid clues include hyphenated words, multiple words, made-up words, gestures, or saying any part of the password. Failure to guess the password passes control to the other team, and the process repeats until the password is guessed or both teams have failed to guess twice.

Each round of gameplay features a maximum of five passwords, which are common clues to a mystery person, place, thing, title, or idea, known as the "Password Puzzle". After a team correctly guesses a password, the clue receiver of that team is also allowed one guess at the solution to the Password Puzzle. Correctly identifying the solution awards a cash amount, and any remaining passwords are then revealed. The first team to reach a cash goal, which increased throughout the series' run, wins the game and proceeds to the bonus round. On Password Plus, the first and second rounds were originally valued at $100 each, with subsequent rounds valued at $200 until a team scores $300; this was changed in 1981 to add a third puzzle at $100 and a goal of $500, with players trading partners after the third puzzle. Puzzles on Super Password range from $100 to $400 in amounts of $100, still with a goal of $500, but after playing "Cashword" the players switched partners. If neither team correctly guesses the password, then neither team may guess the solution to the Password Puzzle and the next password is revealed.

=== Differences in rules ===
Starting on April 23, 1979, and lasting until the end of its run, Password Plus made two rule changes. The first disallowed the use of direct antonyms as clues, such as "loose" as a clue for the password of "tight". The other rule change dictated that, if one team failed to offer a guess to a password, then the opposing team's clue giver was allowed to give two clues on their turn. Failing to decide whether to pass or play, or give a clue in time, also enabled the opponents to give two clues.

From the premiere of Password Plus until June 1979, the teams were allowed three clues on each password.

If the cluegiver gives the password away or the receiver guesses the word on an invalid clue given by the cluegiver, the other team gets to guess the puzzle as a penalty.

On Password Plus, if the guessing contestant was unable to identify the subject of the puzzle after correctly guessing the last word, the cluegiver was given a chance to guess; if neither teammate did so, the subject was revealed and the puzzle thrown out. On Super Password, if neither member of the cluegiving team could solve the puzzle, the other team was given a chance before throwing out the puzzle.

Whichever team solves the second puzzle on Super Password plays an additional bonus called "Cashword" (stylized as "Ca$hword"). The Cashword is a significantly more difficult password that the celebrity partner has to describe to his/her contestant partner in three one-word clues (with five seconds allowed per clue). Failure to guess the Cashword in three attempts, or giving an illegal clue at any point, ends the Cashword round. A cash bonus is offered for correctly guessing the Cashword, starting at $1,000 and increasing by that amount for every episode in which it is unclaimed.

=== Bonus Round ===
The winning team plays for a cash prize in the bonus round, called "Alphabetics" on Password Plus and "Super Password" or "The End Game" on Super Password.

Both bonus rounds are played with nearly-identical rules. The celebrity partner of the winning team has sixty seconds to attempt conveying a series of ten passwords, each displayed on a game board and starting with consecutive letters of the alphabet. The celebrity may give more than one clue per word, or pass on a word and return to it if time remains. Correctly guessing all ten passwords awards a cash jackpot, while failing to do so awards $100 for each correctly guessed word. Password Plus initially offered $5,000, but changed in November 1981 to offering a cash jackpot which started at $5,000 and grew by that amount for every unsuccessful bonus round, a rule which also carried over to Super Password.

Giving an invalid clue in the bonus round initially deducted $1,000 on Password Plus, but upon the change to a building jackpot, the penalty for invalid clues changed to 20 percent of the jackpot's value. Mentioning all or part of the word removed the word from play. On Super Password, any invalid clues removed the word.

Contestants are allowed to keep playing until they are defeated or until they win seven games in a row on Password Plus, or five games on Super Password, whichever happens first.

== Merchandise ==
Three editions of the Password Plus board game were made by Milton Bradley in the early 1980s. Milton Bradley made an eight-track cartridge version of the game for its OMNI Entertainment System. In 1983, a version for the Atari 2600 and Intellivision was going to be made by The Great Game Company. However, both versions were scrapped later on due to the Video Game Crash at the time.

A Super Password video game was released for MS-DOS, Apple II, and Commodore 64 by Gametek in 1988. A version for the NES was also planned around that time, but never surfaced. In 2000, a Super Password hand-held game by Tiger Electronics was released.

== Program information ==
=== Broadcast history ===
==== Password Plus ====
Password Plus (which was known pre-production as Password '79) was first shown at 12:30 pm ET/11:30 am CT and PT, filling part of the time left when the talk/variety program America Alive! was cancelled. On March 5, 1979, two months after its debut, the series made its first time slot move to noon/11:00 am following the cancellation of NBC’s revival of Jeopardy!. It moved back to 12:30/11:30 on August 13, 1979, when the Goodson-Todman game Mindreaders premiered at noon/11:00. On June 20, 1980, three other NBC game shows were canceled to make room for David Letterman's morning talk show and when that programme was reduced to sixty minutes on August 4, 1980, Password Plus was moved on to 11:30/10:30, while soap opera The Doctors moved from 2:00/1:00 to 12:30/11:30 (this time facing the second half-hours of CBS' The Price Is Right and reruns of The Love Boat on ABC), with Card Sharks already taking the noon/11:00 slot on June 23, 1980, replacing Chain Reaction. The series returned to noon/11:00 on October 26, 1981 upon the cancellation of Card Sharks, and remained there for the rest of its run. The final episode aired on March 26, 1982, and through a scheduling shuffle with The Doctors, its place on NBC's schedule was replaced by Search for Tomorrow (which had moved to the network from CBS).

==== Super Password ====
The program returned in September 1984 as Super Password and aired in the noon Eastern time slot, facing, for its first two weeks, Family Feud, then Ryan's Hope on ABC. Despite some of NBC's affiliates preempting the 12:00 pm hour in favor of local newscasts or other syndicated programming, as it was also the case with Password Plus, Super Password remained in the top-of-the-hour time slot for its entire 4½-year run. Later in the decade, however, NBC affiliates began dropping most of the network's entire daytime programming, along with Super Password; the increasing number of stations carrying local newscasts at noon during that time caused the program to experience a decline in viewership. The show's final episode aired on March 24, 1989, the same day Sale of the Century aired its series finale. (Note: NBC returned the 12:00 pm timeslot to its affiliates after Super Password ended its run.)

=== Episode status and reruns ===
Both shows exist in their entirety, and can currently be seen on Buzzr. Both shows were previously aired on GSN. However, certain episodes were not shown due to celebrity clearance issues that were out of GSN's control.

Beginning on July 2, 2018, GameTV in Canada began airing the first 65 episodes of Super Password.

=== Kerry Ketchem ===
In January 1988, a man later discovered to be a previously convicted felon with active warrants for his arrest appeared on Super Password. Kerry Ketchem, who competed on the program under the name "Patrick Quinn", won a total of $58,600 in cash over four days on Super Password, which included a record-tying $55,000 jackpot win in the bonus round. However, his appearance on the show led to his apprehension on charges of fraud.

Ketchem's arrest came as the result of an investigation started when a bank manager in Anchorage, Alaska, called the United States Secret Service after having seen his episodes. He was discovered to have outstanding fraud warrants in Alaska and Indiana, and producer Robert Sherman was contacted by the Secret Service shortly thereafter. Around the same time, Ketchem—claiming that he was leaving the country on work-related business—called Mark Goodson Productions and asked if he could collect his winnings in person instead of having a check mailed to him, which is the usual standard procedure. Sherman said yes, with the knowledge of the Secret Service, and gave him a date and time. When Ketchem showed up to the Goodson offices he ran down eleven flights of stairs and was apprehended and taken into custody by local officials after being found in the restroom. The arrest came two days after his appearances finished airing. Booked on the outstanding Indiana warrant, Ketchem was found to have used his "Patrick Quinn" alias (which came from the name of one of Ketchem's college professors) to commit credit card fraud in Alaska; to defraud a used car dealer; and to collect illegally on an insurance policy on the life of his ex-wife. Ketchem, who had previously spent 18 months in prison on an unrelated felony charge, agreed to a plea deal in May 1988 on charges of mail fraud. He was sentenced to five years in prison and his winnings were rescinded as he was ruled to have violated contestant eligibility rules by using a false name.

== International versions ==
Country	Title	Broadcaster	Presenter	Premiere	Finale
Portugal	Palavra Puxa Palavra	RTP2	António Sala	September 30, 1990	March 28, 1993
Portugal	Palavra Puxa Palavra	RTP1	António Sala	July 8, 1993	June 11, 1994
Sweden	Femettan	SVT	Staffan Ling	February 7, 1983	January 12, 1994

== See also ==
- Password
- Million Dollar Password
