= Card Sharks =

American television game show

- Genre: Game show
- Created by: Chester Feldman
- Directed by: Paul Alter (1978–79, 1986); Marc Breslow (1979–89); R. Brian DiPirro (2001–02); Lenn Goodside (2019–21)
- Presented by: Jim Perry; Bob Eubanks; Bill Rafferty; Pat Bullard; Joel McHale
- Starring: Ann Pennington; Janice Baker; Lois Aurino; Kristin Bjorklund; Melinda Hunter; Markie Post; Lacey Pemberton; Suzanna Williams; Tami Roman; Jerry Wolf; Alexis Gaube
- Announcer: Gene Wood; Gary Kroeger; Donna Jay Fulks
- Theme music composer: Score Productions (1978–81); Edd Kalehoff (1978–89); Alan Ett, Scott Liggett, Gregory V. Sherman (2001–02); Tim Mosher & Stoker (2019–21)
- Country of origin: United States
- No. of episodes: 864 (NBC); 826 (CBS); 195 (1986–87 Syn.); 65 (2001–02 Syn.); 21 (ABC)

Production
- Executive producers: Chester Feldman (1978–89); Jonathan Goodson (1986–89); Scott St. John (2019–21); Jennifer Mullin (2019–21); Jack Martin (2019); Joel McHale (2019–21)
- Producers: Jonathan Goodson (1978–81); Mimi O'Brien (1986–89); Michael Malone (2001–02)
- Production locations: NBC Studios; Burbank, California (1978–81); CBS Television City; Hollywood, California (1986–89, 2019); Tribune Studios; Hollywood, California (2001–02); CBS Studio Center; Studio City, California (2020–21)
- Running time: 22–26 minutes (1978–2002); 42–46 minutes (2019–21)
- Production companies: Mark Goodson-Bill Todman Productions (1978–81); Suzanne Productions (1978–79); Mark Goodson Television Productions (1986–89); Pearson Television (2001–02); Fremantle (2019–21); Start Entertainment (2019–21)

Original release
- Network: NBC
- Release: April 24, 1978 – October 23, 1981
- Network: CBS
- Release: January 6, 1986 – March 31, 1989
- Network: Syndication
- Release: September 8, 1986 – June 5, 1987
- Release: September 17, 2001 – January 11, 2002
- Network: ABC
- Release: June 12, 2019 – July 7, 2021

Card Sharks is an American television game show. It was created by Chester Feldman for Mark Goodson-Bill Todman Productions. Contestants attempt to predict the outcome of survey questions to gain control of a row of oversized playing cards, then determine whether the next card drawn is higher or lower. The title Card Sharks is a play on the term "card shark", a person skilled at card games.

The concept has been made into a series four separate times since its debut in 1978, and it also appeared as part of CBS's Gameshow Marathon. The show originally ran on NBC from 1978 to 1981 with Jim Perry hosting. The show returned and ran from 1986 to 1989 on CBS with Bob Eubanks as host, accompanied by a syndication production with Bill Rafferty. Gene Wood was the announcer in both the 1970s and 1980s. Another syndicated production aired in 2001 with Pat Bullard as host and Gary Kroeger as announcer. A revival hosted by Joel McHale aired on ABC from June 2019 to July 2021. Each production has featured various assistants to handle the playing cards.

Reruns of the older versions currently air on Buzzr.

== Gameplay ==
Two contestants are assigned separate oversized decks of 52 playing cards, which the contestants themselves cut before each game (offscreen prior to 2019), and are dealt the first several cards for their row. The champion (or champion-designate if there were two new contestants) played the red cards on top, while the challenger played the blue cards on the bottom. Each contestant's row of cards had a bracket atop it with their name on it, which was used to mark their "base cards". The goal is to complete a row of cards by correctly predicting whether the next is higher or lower in value, similarly to acey deucey.

=== Main round ===
Contestants alternately respond to questions to gain control of the cards. In all versions from 1978 to 1989, the returning champion was usually selected to go first; if there were two new contestants, a backstage coin toss determined the player who sits in the champion's position. The 2019 revival instead has both contestants cut their decks onstage and show the resulting bottom card; the contestant with the higher card goes first.

Similarly to another Goodson-Todman game show, Family Feud, survey questions are posed to groups of 100 people, all of whom are typically in a common demographic group. (For example, "We asked 100 teachers, 'Has a student ever given you an apple?' How many said they have?"). Contestants are asked to predict how many of those 100 people responded in a specific manner. Their opponent is then asked whether they think the actual number is higher or lower than the previous contestant's response. The actual number is then revealed, and if the opponent is correct, they play their cards first; otherwise, the contestant to whom the question was posed plays first.

The contestant who wins the question is shown the first card in their row of seven (five from 1978 to 1989 and ten in the first season of the 2019 revival) and can either keep it or replace it with the next card off the top of their individual deck, which is then required to be played. The contestant then guesses whether the next card in the row is higher or lower and continues to do so as long as the guesses are correct. If the next card is the same rank as the previous, or if the contestant makes an incorrect guess, that contestant loses control, and whatever cards they have played are discarded and replaced. The opposing contestant then has a chance to play from ther base card, without the opportunity to exchange first. Either contestant can also elect to "freeze" their position if they are unsure of the next card. This prevents the opponent from playing and resets the contestant's base card to the frozen card, and whatever cards that were turned in that instance are not discarded.

If neither contestant has guessed all the cards in their row correctly, or if one has frozen their position, play continues with another toss-up question, with the opposing contestant providing the initial numerical guess. In all versions from 1978 to 1989, as well as the Gameshow Marathon episode, the first two games consisted of a maximum of four questions each, and the third tie-breaker game contained a maximum of three questions; since 2019, only one game is played per match, with a maximum of five survey questions. If the contestants still have not cleared their row of cards prior to the last question of the round, that question is played as "sudden death." The winner of the sudden death question can either play their cards—and change their base card if they desire—or pass to their opponent, who has to play without the option to change the base card. If either contestant guesses incorrectly, their opponent automatically wins the game.

In all versions from 1978 to 1989, as well as the Gameshow Marathon episode, matches were best two-out-of-three, with the third game being played with three cards per contestant and a maximum of three high-low questions. Each game win was worth $100. The 2019 revival removes the "best two-out-of-three" aspect, with only one game now being played per match; whoever wins the game now receives $10,000 to use as a starting stake in the Money Cards.

==== Rule changes ====
In the 1980–1981 season, a $500 bonus was awarded to any contestant who provided the exact number of people responding to a specific question, a rule that was modified in the 1986–89 version. In the final few months of 1981, if a contestant was able to complete their row of five cards successfully without freezing or guessing wrong once, he or she won a $500 bonus. These bonuses were guaranteed regardless of the outcome of the overall match, meaning a contestant keeps the cash bonus regardless of winning or losing.

The 1986–89 version added two new varieties of questions in addition to the traditional survey questions. The traditional surveys could also be conducted with a group of ten in the studio audience who shared a characteristic (e.g., ten single women, ten security guards, ten people over 80). Because the odds of being exact were much higher (1:10 compared to 1:100), the exact guess bonus for this type of question was reduced to $100, and the group of ten shared a $100 bonus. The same poll group was used for a week's worth of episodes. The other change was to add general knowledge trivia questions into the game beginning in October 1986. Known as "educated guess questions," the contestant in control gives a numerical answer to the question, similar to a survey, but often much higher numerals that had to be posted as a Chyron on the screen instead of being on the contestant's podium. The opponent, as usual, must guess higher or lower than the answer. Exact guesses won a $500 bonus for the contestant.

The 1986–87 syndicated version introduced prize cards that were shuffled into the deck. If a card was revealed, that contestant was credited with the prize and claimed it if he or she won the game. The next card from the top of the contestant's deck replaced the prize card, and the contestant continued playing. At this time, the maximum number of questions per game was changed to a 4–3–2 format. Shortly thereafter, game #1 was also changed to a three question maximum, moving to a 3–3–2 format. However, all games reverted to the 4–4–3 format by December 1986. Also, contestants only won the prizes claimed for winning the match, or $100 if no prize cards were found during gameplay.

In 1988, the tie-breaker round changed to a single sudden death question. The controlling contestant was shown both base cards before being given the option to play the cards (and change their base card if desired) or pass to the opponent (who had to play without changing). As before, if either contestant guessed incorrectly, their opponent automatically won the match.

The 2019 version added percentage questions in addition to the traditional survey questions; otherwise, gameplay remains the same. There are no cash bonuses offered for an exact guess.

=== Money Cards ===
The winner of the main game plays the Money Cards bonus game. The original board consisted of a series of eight cards dealt out on three levels; the 2001 revival changed this to seven cards. The champion is staked with a dollar amount before the round begins, and wagers money on each card prior to calling higher or lower. A correct call adds the wager to their bank, while a miss deducts it. Prior to 2001, the player was staked with $200 prior to the round.

After calling the first three cards, the last card in the row was moved to the first position in the second row, and the contestant received an additional $200 to wager with the next three cards. The last card in the third row was moved to the first position in the top row, and the contestant made a wager for the final card. The minimum bet for each card was $50 ($100 in the 2001 revival), except for the final card, the "Big Bet" (renamed "Major Wager" for the 2001 revival), where the contestant was required to wager at least half of the money earned thus far.

If a contestant lost all the money banked ("busted") on the first row, the last card called was moved to the first position on the second row, and the contestant received another $200 to wager with the final four cards. If the contestant busted after moving up to this level on either the original or 1986 series, the game ended.

If a contestant wagered their entire bank on each card and made a correct prediction each time, the maximum payout was stated to be $28,800 on the original 1970s series, $32,000 on both 1980s series, $51,800 on the 2001 series, and $640,000 on the 2019 series. As of 2021, the only contestant who has successfully achieved this feat is Norma Brown, who won $28,800 in 1978.

On the NBC version, a champion was allowed a maximum of seven wins. On the CBS series, champions were retired either by reaching five wins or surpassing the network’s winnings limit.

Starting in 2019, the player's winnings are represented in oversized $500, $1,000, $5,000, $10,000, and $25,000 chips. The board is now a single row of seven cards, with no additional money given halfway through. Players are given the chance to change any one card during the round. Players are required to physically place chips equal to their bet on a table in front of them on sections labeled "HIGHER" or "LOWER". Prior to the last card, players must bet at least $1,000 on each card. Players who reach the last card without busting are given the option to "cash out" and quit with their current winnings rather than play the final card. If they elect to play, they must gamble at least half their bank on the last card. The maximum possible payout is $640,000.

==== Rule changes ====
Duplicate cards were originally counted as incorrect guesses, in the same manner as the main game. Starting on October 20, 1980, a duplicate in the Money Cards rounds was regarded as a "push"; the contestant did not lose their wager, and moved to the next card. The "push" rule remained intact until late in the 2001 revival's run. In the first season of the 2019 revival, a duplicate card was once again treated as an incorrect guess; in the second season, it was once again treated as a push.

Initially, contestants could only change their base card on the bottom level of the board, at the start of the round. This was later altered to allow the contestant to change the base card on each new line of cards if they so desired.

During the 1986–89 version, three extra cards (known as "spare cards") were positioned to the left of the Money Cards board. These cards could be used initially any time to change an undesired card, even to change the same card multiple times, but during the run were later amended to allow only one change per line at any point in the line. The additional amount awarded for moving to the second line increased from $200 to $400. This changed the maximum potential payout to $32,000.

On the 2001 series, each winning contestant's score from the main game was divided by three; therefore, players started the round with $700 to wager with and that amount was added to their score once they reached both the second level and the Major Wager, which was a Card Sharks first.

Players can change exactly one card, anywhere on the line, in the 2019 version.

=== Car games ===
Beginning in the fall of 1986, champions were also given an opportunity to win a new car following the Money Cards round. The car round made its debut on the syndicated series shortly after its debut, with the daytime series adopting the round in October 1986.

From its inception until July 1988, the car game used jokers. The champion received one for winning the match to ensure a chance to win the car, and three additional jokers were shuffled into the Money Cards deck. Following the Money Cards, a row of seven new cards were shown to the champion with a number below each one. The champion would place a joker over one of the cards to select it, and the host would turn the card over to reveal what was on it. If the word "CAR" was on the back, the champion won it. The same car was available for all five shows in a given week. For shows featuring children, the car game was played for a grand prize trip to Hawaii.

On the daytime series, champions played until they either were defeated, played the car game five times, or reached CBS' winnings limit. The syndicated series carried the same five game limit, but also had rules concerning cars. At first, a car win retired a champion automatically; the show at the time was using high-end General Motors offerings such as Cadillacs and Corvettes. After a few weeks of this, GM began providing mid-priced options like the Chevrolet Camaro, Pontiac Firebird, and Pontiac Sunbird, and contestants were allowed to play until reaching five wins or the show's winnings limit. The rules changed one more time as 1987 began, when American Motors became the supplier for the car game; options included the Renault Alliance and Jeep Wrangler, and champions were retired after two car wins.

In July 1988, the bonus changed to feature an audience poll question similar to those used in the main game. The contestant was read the question and registered their guess on a board with a range from zero to ten. If the contestant made a correct prediction, they won the car. If their guess was off by one, the contestant won another $500.

== Broadcast history ==
=== 1978–1981 ===
The original Card Sharks aired on NBC from April 24, 1978 to October 23, 1981, hosted by Jim Perry; it was the first new Goodson-Todman game show to debut on NBC since the end of the original Match Game in September 1969. The show was the first to be greenlit by newly-hired NBC executive, formerly of ABC, Michael Brockman, after the poor reputation of many shows from producers like former NBC Daytime executive Lin Bolen, Merrill Heatter and Bob Quigley, Ralph Edwards and Ralph Andrews, and Brockman hired Goodson-Todman based on their experience. From its debut until June 20, 1980, Card Sharks aired at 10:00 am (ET)/9:00 am (CT/MT/PT). The series was one of the few respectably-rated programs (daytime or otherwise) on NBC under Fred Silverman's tenure as network president, which at the time was struggling to gain ratings in both daytime and prime-time.

After a scheduling shuffle necessitated by the debut of The David Letterman Show on June 23, 1980, Card Sharks moved to noon/11:00 am, a timeslot where it first faced The $20,000 Pyramid, which was in its last week of its run, and then from June 30 on, the top-rated game show in daytime, Family Feud on ABC; the first half of The Young and the Restless in certain markets on CBS; and preemptions on local affiliates due to many stations electing to air local newscasts, talk shows, or other syndicated programming in the noon hour. Card Sharks remained in the noon/11:00 slot until its final episode aired on October 23, 1981.

=== 1986–1989 ===
The CBS version of Card Sharks debuted at 10:30/9:30 am January 6, 1986, as a replacement for Body Language, and stayed in that timeslot for its entire run; Press Your Luck relocated to the latter show's old 4:00/3:00 pm slot to make room for Card Sharks. Until January 1987, Card Sharks faced off against its original host Jim Perry's game show Sale of the Century on NBC in the time slot; Sale of the Century was moved to 10:00 am that year. Blockbusters (with the then-host of the syndicated Card Sharks, Bill Rafferty) and then Alex Trebek's Classic Concentration followed as competition for Card Sharks. This version ended its run on March 31, 1989, and was replaced by a short-lived version of Now You See It. The new host of the CBS version was Bob Eubanks; the host of the British adaptation, Bruce Forsyth, was at one point being considered for the job as well, after having a short-lived game show in the US on ABC, Bruce Forsyth's Hot Streak (Forsyth would eventually host Play Your Cards Right, the British adaptation of the series). Patrick Wayne was also considered for the job.

The syndicated series debuted on September 8, 1986, replacing The Nighttime Price Is Right. Bill Rafferty was host of this version. For the first half of the season, this syndicated Card Sharks series had fairly decent clearances, but this changed due to the show's ratings struggles in an overcrowded syndicated game show market. At the midseason point, the syndicated Card Sharks disappeared from quite a few of its markets, while many stations that continued to air it moved it to very undesirable late-night and early morning timeslots. The series continued to air until June 5, 1987, in the markets that kept it, with re-runs airing until September 11 of that year. Plans were to replace Card Sharks with the return of the Match Game with original host Gene Rayburn, but these plans never came to fruition.

=== 2001 ===
The Pat Bullard-hosted 2001 series debuted on September 17, 2001 (though as it launched the week after the September 11 attacks, was subject to pre-emption by several stations for news coverage) and aired new episodes until December 14, 2001. Four weeks of re-runs aired following that, and the series was cancelled altogether on January 11, 2002. In most of its markets the 2001 Card Sharks was either paired with or aired on the same station as one or both of the Pearson Television-produced shows that were airing at the time, To Tell the Truth with John O'Hurley or Family Feud with Louie Anderson.

For this version, two best-of-three matches were played per episode, each with two new contestants. No questions were asked; instead, a random draw was held backstage to determine who had initial control, with the option to pass or play after seeing the first card. A single row of seven cards was used, and a mistake by one contestant gave control to the other. Both contestants were given two "Clip Chips" at the start of the match, which could be used to allow the one in control to change the last exposed card by correctly predicting the outcome of a pre-recorded video segment. Each game was worth $500 and could be won either by a correct guess on the last card, or by default if the opponent missed it. If the contestants tied at one game each, the deciding game was played using three cards.

The winners of the two matches competed against one another in one seven-card game referred to as the "Big Deal," and could use any Clip Chips they still had. The winner received an additional $1,100, bringing their total up to $2,100, and advanced to the Money Cards. Losing contestants in either the matches or the Big Deal kept any money they had won.

For the Money Cards round, six cards were dealt out in three rows: three on the bottom row, two in the middle, one on the top. The contestant's $2,100 was divided into three equal stakes of $700, one of which was added to their total upon starting each row. Only the initial card on each row could be changed. The minimum bet was $100 for every card except the one on the top row (the "Major Wager") which required the contestant to risk at least half their total. A contestant could win up to $51,800 in this round.

=== Pilot ===
On October 1, 2018, a pilot for the Bullard version from 2000 was uploaded by fellow veteran game show host Wink Martindale on YouTube as part of his ongoing webseries called "Wink's Vault". On February 3, 2025; the pilot was also aired on Buzzr as part of a marathon called the "Card Sharks 40th Anninversary Morning Marathon".

=== Gameshow Marathon (2006, CBS) ===
On June 15, 2006, Card Sharks was the fifth of seven classic game shows featured in CBS's month-long Gameshow Marathon hosted by Ricki Lake and announced by Rich Fields as it was one of the "semifinal rounds" in the tournament. The contestants were Brande Roderick and Paige Davis.

The set was modeled after the original 1978–81 production. In the Money Cards, the winner earned $1,000 for each row, for a possible $144,000. Roderick won $6,000 in the bonus round.

In the car game, unlike the 1986–89 version, the game was changed where 10 people were polled (cheerleaders in this episode) were called up for another poll question. This time, the rules were fixed and were made easier with the contestant simply having to say whether the number of people who did do what they were asked (e.g., "We asked these cheerleaders, 'Have you ever dated someone from a rival school?' How many of these 10 cheerleaders said they had dated someone from a rival school?") was a number higher or lower than 5. A card from the blue deck was shown lying face down and was brought out with the numerical value of the people who said "yes". The card was then revealed after the contestant's guess was made and if the value matched the contestant's guess, then the car was won. Roderick won $10,000 along with a BMW M Roadster (worth $40,445) for a grand total of $50,445 for the home viewer.

=== 2019–2021 ===
On March 13, 2019, Vulture reported that ABC was partnering with Fremantle to reboot the series, with pre-production on new hour-long episodes of Card Sharks and Press Your Luck being underway and taping slated to begin sometime in the spring. Scott St. John (a producer on Match Game) served as an executive producer. Airing on ABC makes Card Sharks one of only a handful of shows (joining To Tell the Truth, The Price Is Right, and Match Game) to have at one point or another aired on all three of the Big Three television networks.

On April 8, 2019, TVLine reported that actor Joel McHale would host the new revival series. The series premiered on June 12, 2019.

On November 20, 2019, the series was renewed for a second season. From March 13, 2020 to July 3, 2020, the show suspended production as a result of the COVID-19 pandemic in the United States. This resulted in the season two premiere being delayed to October 18, 2020. The series later resumed its second season on June 23, 2021. On April 1, 2022, it was reported that the series was cancelled.

The 2019 version featured similar rules as the 1978–81 and 1986–89 iterations, with two new players competing in the main game and no returning champions. A separate row of seven cards was dealt for each player, and a maximum of five questions were asked, with the fifth (if necessary) played under sudden-death rules. The winner was decided by a single victory instead of a best-of-three match. During the first season, the number of cards per row was ten.

The Money Cards round was played using a single line of seven cards. The player was staked with $10,000, presented as five chips worth $1,000 each and one worth $5,000, and the first card was turned over to start the game. One card was able to be changed before any turn in this round. The player's wager was added to his/her total for a correct guess, and subtracted for an incorrect one. In season one, the player lost the wager if a card of the same rank was turned up; in season two, this situation was counted as a "push," with no money won or lost. The player had to bet a multiple of $1,000 on every card except the last; at this point, he/she could either end the game and keep all winnings or bet at least half the total as a multiple of $500. For this final turn, the player was allowed to trade in a $1,000 chip for two $500 chips so that he/she could bet exactly half the total if desired. The round ended immediately if the player went broke. The maximum potential payout was $640,000.

== Production ==
=== Personnel ===
Gene Wood was the primary announcer on both the original and 1980s Card Sharks, with Charlie O'Donnell and Bob Hilton serving as occasional substitutes. Jack Narz, Jay Stewart, and Johnny Olson also served as substitutes for NBC, and Johnny Gilbert and Rod Roddy also served as substitutes for CBS. Gary Kroeger was the announcer in 2001, and Rich Fields was the announcer of the Gameshow Marathon episode. Donna Jay Fulks served as announcer during the 2019-2021 series.

The theme for the NBC version was previously used on the Goodson-Todman series Double Dare with host Alex Trebek that aired in 1976 on CBS. Edd Kalehoff wrote that theme through Score Productions, and the theme for the 1980s version of Card Sharks through his own production company. Alan Ett and Scott Liggett composed the 2001 series theme. A revived version of the original theme was used for the ABC revival.

Ann Pennington, Janice Baker, Lois Areno, Kristin Bjorklund, Melinda Hunter, and Markie Post all served as models on NBC. Lacey Pemberton and Suzanna Williams were the models on the concurrent CBS and syndication runs in the 1980s, and Tami Roman was the model in 2001. Jerry Wolf and Alexis Gaube were the dealers during the 2019-2021 series. Following that show's cancellation, Wolf departed Hollywood while Gaube became the newest model on The Price Is Right in 2022.

=== Episode status ===
All versions of Card Sharks are completely intact. It was one of the few NBC daytime game shows during this time frame to escape wiping, due to Goodson-Todman blocking the network from wiping their shows.

Reruns of the Jim Perry, Bob Eubanks, Bill Rafferty and Joel McHale versions have appeared on Game Show Network in the past. Buzzr now airs reruns from these versions of the program (except McHale).

The Pat Bullard version has never been reaired since being cancelled.

== International versions ==
The most significant difference in gameplay for foreign formats of Card Sharks was the use of married couples instead of individual contestants (except the U.S., Brazilian, Chilean, Greek, and Portuguese versions, which only featured individual contestants). All global versions of Card Sharks (except the U.S., Brazil, Chile, and Greece) were mostly produced by Reg Grundy.

Country	Local name	Host	Network	Year aired
Australia	Play Your Cards Right	Ugly Dave Gray	Seven Network	1984–1985
Belgium (Dutch)	Hoger, Lager	Walter Capiau	TV1	1983–1989
Brazil	Corrida de Fórmula B	Silvio Santos	Tupi	1979–1982
Brazil	Jogo do Mais ou Menos	Silvio Santos	SBT	1996; 2013
Chile	Las cosas claras con Doña Clara (segment on Sabado Gigante)	Don Francisco	Canal 13	1983
Georgia	?	?	GTV1	2000s
Germany	Bube, Dame, Hörig	Elmar Hörig	Sat.1	1996–1999
Greece	Πάνω ή κάτω Páno í káto	Alki Tallow	ANT1	1990
Hong Kong	大牌; Dai Pai	?	ATV	1982
Indonesia	Super Rejeki 1 Milyar	Dave Hendrik	antv	2006–2007
New Zealand	Play Your Cards Right	Kenny Cantor	TVNZ	1983
Peru	Mayor o Menor (segment on Sábados de Belmont)	Ricardo Belmont	América Televisión	1984–1985
Philippines	Hi-Lo Todo Panalo (segment on Eat Bulaga!)	Hosts of Eat Bulaga!	GMA Network	2002–2003
Philippines	Peraphy (segment on Eat Bulaga!)	Hosts of Eat Bulaga!	TV5	2023–present
Poland	Rekiny kart	Rudi Schuberth	Polsat	1997–1999
Portugal	Jogo de Cartas	Nicolau Breyner; Serenella Andrade	RTP1	1989–1990; 1991–1992
Sweden	Lagt kort ligger	Magnus Härenstam	SVT	1987–1990
Turkey	Aşaği Yukari	Meltem Cumbul	aTV	1994–1997
United Kingdom	Play Your Cards Right	Bruce Forsyth	ITV1	1980–1987; 1994–1999; 2002–2003
United Kingdom	Alan Carr's Epic Gameshow (as Play Your Cards Right)	Alan Carr	ITV1	2020–2022

== Merchandise ==
- The first Card Sharks video game was released by Sharedata and Softie in 1988 for the Apple II, Commodore 64 and IBM PC compatibles. It is based on the 1986–89 format, using the single sudden-death question tiebreaker in the main game. If a contestant gets an exact guess on a question in the main game, they win a $100 bonus, instead of the $500 bonus on the show. Also, unlike the show, the game does not use the educated guess or audience poll questions.
- Endless Games published a Card Sharks home game in 2002 to commemorate the 25th anniversary of the series at the time. It uses visual designs based on the 2001 production while the gameplay is based on the 1986 format of the series, prior to the car game being introduced. 18 years later, in 2020; they published another Card Sharks home game, based on the ABC version hosted by Joel McHale who is on the cover of the box. This version celebrates the 40 year old history of the show.
- Software for mobile phones was released on June 1, 2005 by Telescope Inc., which also uses the logo from 2001 to 2002. Its theme music is a remix of the 1978–81 version. The rules and gameplay are based from a variety of the 1970s and 1980s variants. More survey questions were also available for download.
- A single-player online game was released by the now defunct website uproar.com. The logo and set were similar to its 2001–02 counterpart while its gameplay (minus the poll questions) was very similar to the 1970s and 1980s counterparts. However, as of September 30, 2006, the website no longer offered any game show-based games of any kind.
- The now defunct website Gameshow24.com had an online version of Card Sharks in 2004. Its logo and set were based on the original 1978–81 format, and the main theme song had a unique mixture of both the 1978 and 2001 productions, and like its Uproar.com counterpart it had no poll questions either, but its gameplay was very similar to that of The Price Is Right where players have to guess grocery items that were 'higher' or 'lower' than the ones that precede them. The show was also similar to The Price Is Right in that it used various sound effects and theme music from The Price Is Right at various points, such as playing the infamous losing horn for a bust or for failing to win the car in the bonus round during the Eubanks and Rafferty eras.
- In 2021, a brand new online version of Card Sharks was released by the casual gaming website called Arkadium where it mostly plays like the Perry, Eubanks/Rafferty versions from the 70s & 80s (along with their theme songs from '86 & '78) respectively, but just like the McHale version on ABC from season 2, it had seven rows of playing cards for the champion (red) & challenger (blue) to play with instead of five.
