= Messmore & Damon =

American mechanical model company

- Company type: Private
- Industry: Mechanical models, display design, special effects
- Founded: 1914
- Founders: George Harold Messmore; Joseph Damon
- Fate: Defunct
- Headquarters: New York City, United States
- Area served: United States
- Key people: George Harold Messmore; Joseph Damon

Messmore & Damon was a twentieth-century company which specialized in the creation of mechanical models, used in fairs, advertising, television and theater.

== History ==
The company was founded in New York City in 1914 by George Harold Messmore and Joseph Damon. Messmore had experience with building animal automata for advertising use; Damon, an artist, built clay figures for their creations.

The firm's business included the manufacture of parade floats and department store displays. Their most famous work was their 1924 mechanical brontosaurus, the "Amphibious Dinosaurus Brontosaurus". Their display at the Chicago World's Fair included thirty-seven different mechanical creatures.

Starting with a Coney Island display in 1935, the company branched out into torture shows, inciting public criticism. In the 1950s, Messmore & Damon designed the game board for the game show Concentration.
