= Body Language (game show) =

American game show

- Created by: Robert Sherman
- Directed by: Paul Alter
- Presented by: Tom Kennedy
- Narrated by: Johnny Olson; Gene Wood; Bob Hilton
- Theme music composer: Paul Epstein for Score Productions
- Country of origin: United States
- No. of episodes: 396

Production
- Executive producers: Robert Sherman; Chester Feldman
- Producer: Mimi O'Brien
- Production locations: CBS Television City, Los Angeles, California
- Running time: 22 minutes
- Production company: Mark Goodson Productions

Original release
- Network: CBS
- Release: June 4, 1984 – January 3, 1986

Body Language is an American television game show produced by Mark Goodson Productions. The show aired on CBS from June 4, 1984, until January 3, 1986, and was hosted by Tom Kennedy. Johnny Olson was the announcer until his death, after which Gene Wood and Bob Hilton alternated in the role. The show pitted two teams against each other, each consisting of a contestant and a celebrity guest, by using charades to convey words in a word puzzle.

== Gameplay ==
=== Main Game ===
Two rounds were played, with each team receiving one turn per round. On a team's turn, one member stood behind a podium while the other was shown a series of five words or phrases, one at a time, and had to get their partner to guess as many of them as possible in 60 seconds. The clue-giver was not allowed to speak or use any props, including their own clothing, but had to use gestures to communicate the target words/phrases; any violation of this rule forfeited the rest of the team's time. The clue-giver could pass on a word and return to it after playing through all five if time allowed.

If the guesser said a form of the target word (e.g. "beat" for "beating"), the team was credited with solving it. However, a target phrase had to be solved word-for-word (e.g. "vacuum cleaner" could not be solved by only saying "vacuum"). Once the guesser had solved four words, an asterisk was displayed next to the fifth one in order to alert the clue-giver to this fact.

The team was then shown a puzzle containing seven blanks, two of which stood for words that were not shown to the clue-giver. Each correctly guessed word was placed into the puzzle and the guesser was given a chance to guess. A correct answer awarded money to the team.

If the guesser did not solve the puzzle, the guesser on the opposing team chose a blank to reveal and then offered a guess. The teams alternated in this manner until one guesser solved the puzzle. If neither of the guessers solved it after all seven blanks were filled, the clue-givers were then allowed one guess each. If neither of them could solve it, the solution was revealed and the money carried over to the next puzzle. If, after time ran out, the original clue-giver revealed a word that had not been guessed, the opposing team received the first chance at the puzzle.

In the first round, each puzzle was worth $100, and the celebrities gave clues while the contestants guessed. The team members traded roles for the second round, with the puzzle value increased to $250. The first team to reach $500 won the game. If neither team had reached $500 at the end of the second round, a $250 playoff puzzle was played with no clues acted out. The two contestants alternated revealing one blank at a time and offering a guess, with the champion deciding who would have the first turn, and the first one to solve it won the game.

Beginning with the sixth week of the series, parentheses were placed around the two words in each puzzle that were not available to be acted out. Starting on September 3, 1985, and continuing for the rest of the run, any contestant who got their celebrity partner to guess all five words during the second round won a $500 bonus, which did not affect the scores.

=== Bonus Round (The Sweepstakes) ===
In the first half of the bonus round, one team member had 60 seconds to act out up to 10 words or phrases. Originally, the celebrity gave the clues; starting on June 10, 1985, the champion decided whether to give or receive the clues. As in the main game, the clue-giver could pass on a word and return to it if time allowed. The champion received $100 for each correct word. An illegal clue eliminated only the current word instead of ending the round.

For the second half, the clue-giver had to act out three new words or phrases in 20 seconds. Guessing all three multiplied the first-half total by 10, for a maximum bonus of $10,000; a failure awarded the first-half total to the player. Any illegal clue ended this half of the bonus round immediately.

=== Champions/Returning players rule ===
Originally, defending champions remained on the show until they were defeated in the main game, had played the Sweepstakes five times, or reached the $25,000 winnings limit that was in force for CBS game shows at the time, whichever came first. On September 24, 1984, the rules were changed to allow champions to remain until they lost twice in the main game or had played the Sweepstakes six times. The winnings limit was increased to $50,000 on October 22 of that year.

=== Tournaments ===
In mid-1985, Body Language had a two-month-long "Teen Week". The teens played the standard game; any winnings up to $2,500 were awarded in cash, while anything over that amount went into a savings bond that matured on the player's 18th birthday. During the two-month-long Teen Week, getting all five words in the second round won the team a bonus prize. The prize/ticket cue for the show was reworked and later used as the Classic Concentration theme.

== Broadcast history ==
Body Language replaced the second version of Tattletales at 4:00 pm (Eastern)/3:00 pm (Central/Pacific)/2:00 pm (Mountain). Although its sole network competition on ABC, The Edge of Night, was nearing the end of a long run, the show struggled nonetheless because many CBS affiliates had for years preempted the network feed at that time in favor of syndicated programming, which likely brought in larger advertising revenues.

Although some stations tape-delayed the show for broadcast the next morning, Body Language still managed only a fraction of the audience that daytime games such as The Price Is Right and The $25,000 Pyramid did. As such, CBS cancelled the show in December 1985 and aired its last episode on January 3, 1986. Body Language was then replaced on January 6 by a revival of Goodson's Card Sharks, which occupied the 10:30 am timeslot, forcing a move of Press Your Luck to 4:00 pm at the same time; CBS would return the 4:00 pm timeslot to its affiliates after Press Your Luck aired its last episode on September 26, 1986.

== Episode status ==
Body Language was also seen in select markets on Fremantle's Buzzr station, beginning on June 1, 2015, and again on January 19, 2020. The show continued to air until September 24, 2021. The series returned to BUZZR’s daily lineup on April 15, 2024.

== In popular culture ==
Two clips of an episode featuring Betty White as a celebrity partner were shown on a third-season episode of Hot in Cleveland in 2012 titled "How Did You Guys Meet, Anyway?" The footage was digitally altered to include a nametag on White that read "Elka", to make it appear that White's character, Elka Ostrovsky, was appearing as a contestant.
