= Johnny Olson =

American television announcer (1910–1985)

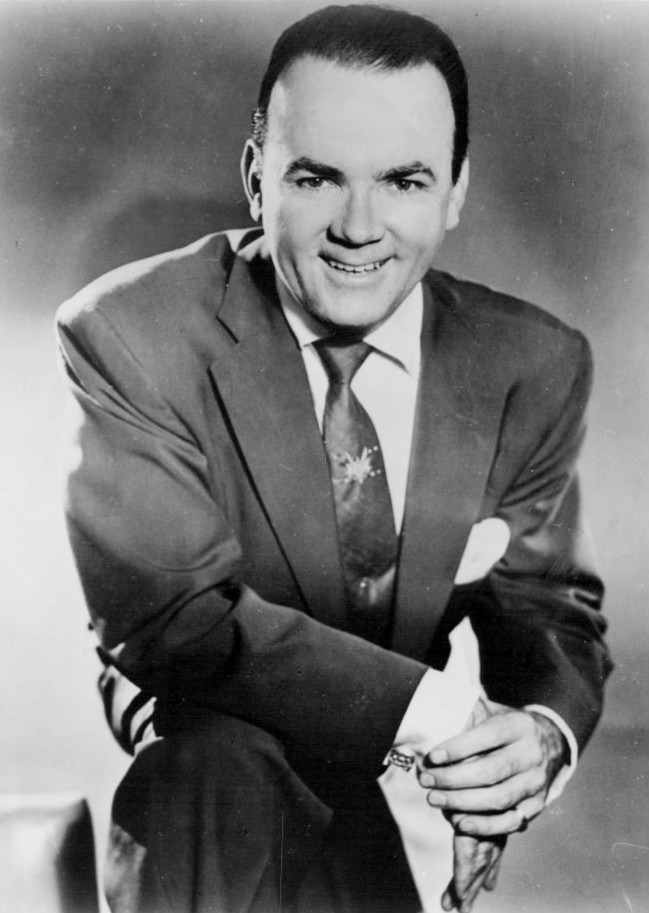
- Olson in 1956
- Born: John Leonard Olson; May 22, 1910; Windom, Minnesota, U.S.
- Died: October 12, 1985 (aged 75); Santa Monica, California, U.S.
- Occupations: Radio personality, television announcer
- Years active: 1944–1985
- Spouse: Penelope Kathleen Powers Olson (m. 1939)

John Leonard Olson (May 22, 1910 – October 12, 1985) was an American radio personality and television announcer. Olson is perhaps best known for his work as an announcer for game shows, particularly the work he did for Mark Goodson-Bill Todman Productions. Olson was the longtime announcer for the original To Tell the Truth and What's My Line? and spent more than a decade as announcer for both Match Game and The Price Is Right, working on the latter series at the time of his death.

== Early career ==
Some of Olson's earliest radio work occurred in the mid-1930s at WTMJ (AM) in Milwaukee, where he appeared on the variety show The Grenadiers. He soon was hosting Johnny Olson Rhythm Rascals, where callers would request songs for him to sing. His future wife Penny was a frequent caller to the show. Olson's first network job on radio was in New York City in 1944, hosting (with his wife) the audience-participation show Ladies Be Seated, a stunt game along the lines of Truth or Consequences, broadcast on ABC Radio. From 1950-1951 Olson was the host of Johnny Olson's Luncheon Club, which was the follow-up replacement for Ladies Be Seated. He had previously hosted several radio shows in Chicago, including the second iteration of Johnny Olson's Rumpus Room, a late-night variety show broadcast from 10:30 p.m. to midnight, which was also the name of a later daytime talk show he hosted on the DuMont Television Network.

== Work for DuMont Television Network ==
In 1945, Olson and his wife hosted a five-week run of a TV version of Ladies Be Seated. From May 1947 to July 1949, Olson hosted Doorway to Fame, an evening television talent show on the new DuMont Television Network. From January 1949 to July 1952, Olson hosted Johnny Olson's Rumpus Room, a daytime television talk show which was the first daytime show broadcast from DuMont's flagship station WABD over DuMont's small East Coast network. Olson also hosted the Saturday-morning children's show Kids and Company on DuMont from September 1951 to June 1952, with co-host Ham Fisher.

== Early announcing work ==
On television, Olson was an announcer on Break the Bank and was the announcer and sometimes the host on Fun for the Money on ABC-TV in 1949. Olson also was the announcer for Play Your Hunch.

Olson was host of Homemaker's Jamboree, an audience-participation game show that debuted on WJZ-TV on October 5, 1952.

Beginning in 1960, Olson announced the CBS prime-time panel game To Tell the Truth. The following year, he added duties on sister show What's My Line?, and in 1962 began announcing on the original Match Game in daytime on NBC until that series ended in 1969. Before going live, Olson did an audience warm-up by asking questions and getting the audience ready for the live telecast.

Twice, in 1965 and again in 1974, he appeared as the mystery guest on What's My Line?. The first time he managed to stump the panel; the second time, Arlene Francis guessed his identity.

Olson was also the announcer for The Jackie Gleason Show from 1962 until its cancellation in 1970.

Olson continued to announce What's My Line? and To Tell the Truth after both shows moved from CBS to syndication in the late 1960s. His involvement with those shows ended when he was designated announcer of the 1972 revivals of The Price Is Right and I've Got a Secret, both of which were taped in Hollywood, where he relocated.

He was the announcer for five of The Jerry Lewis MDA Labor Day Telethons from 1966 to 1970.

== The Price Is Right ==
Although Name That Tune, To Tell the Truth, What's My Line?, and Match Game put Olson in the elite class of television game-show announcers, the revival of The Price Is Right cemented Olson's fame. In addition to serving as host Bob Barker's sidekick, Olson was a beloved and valued member of the "cast". He warmed up the audiences prior to taping; during taping, he often received on-camera exposure (occasionally bantering with Barker) prior to calling out the contestants' names. He also frequently appeared in the showcases.

His exhortation for contestants to "Come on down!" became a catchphrase, and a The Price Is Right tradition observed by his successors Rod Roddy (1986–2003), Rich Fields (2004–2010) and George Gray (2011–present).

== Match Game and later career ==
Olson began announcing for the revived Match Game.

During the 1970s and early 1980s, during the peak of his announcing duties on The Price Is Right and Match Game, he worked on several other Goodson-Todman game shows. He announced:

- Now You See It (hosted by Jack Narz)
- Concentration (hosted by Jack Narz)
- Mindreaders (hosted by Dick Martin)
- Double Dare (hosted by Alex Trebek)
- Body Language (hosted by Tom Kennedy)
- the 1982–84 revival of Tattletales (hosted by Bert Convy)

He also filled in for:

- Jack Clark on the 1974 version of Tattletales
- Bob Hilton on Blockbusters
- Gene Wood on the NBC version of Card Sharks
- Password Plus
- The Match Game-Hollywood Squares Hour

== Death ==
On October 6, 1985, Olson suffered a stroke and was taken to St. John's Hospital and Health Center in Santa Monica, California, where he died on October 12, 1985, at age 75. Funeral services for Johnny Olson followed immediately. Shortly afterward, Bob Barker paid tribute to him at the end of the remaining episodes of The Price Is Right that had been taped with Olson as announcer before he died:

Since taping this program, we've lost our good friend Johnny Olson. You'll continue to see and hear Johnny on the many programs he's already taped. He was dearly loved by all of us, and he'll be sorely missed.

— Bob Barker

Following was a portrait of Olson and a message saying "In Memoriam 1910-1985".
