= Trivia Trap =

American game show

- Genre: Game show
- Created by: Mark Goodson
- Directed by: Marc Breslow
- Presented by: Bob Eubanks
- Announcer: Gene Wood; Charlie O'Donnell; Bob Hilton
- Composer: Edd Kalehoff
- Country of origin: United States
- No. of episodes: 128

Production
- Executive producer: Chester Feldman
- Producer: Jonathan Goodson
- Running time: approx. 22-26 Minutes
- Production company: Mark Goodson Productions

Original release
- Network: ABC
- Release: October 8, 1984 – April 5, 1985

Trivia Trap is an American television game show produced by Mark Goodson Productions. It originally ran from October 8, 1984 to April 5, 1985 on American Broadcasting Company (ABC). Two teams, each composed of three contestants, compete against each other in a variety of trivia-related formats to win a cash prize of $10,000. Bob Eubanks hosted the show, and Gene Wood, Charlie O'Donnell, and Bob Hilton alternated as announcers.

== Gameplay ==
Two teams, each composed of three contestants, compete to answer trivia questions to reach a goal of $1,000. The teams consist of the "juniors", or players under the age of 30, and the "seniors", over the age of the 30. In the original format, the first round of gameplay requires contestants to eliminate wrong answers to trivia questions while avoiding the correct answer, or the "trivia trap". A revision of the game format instead replaced the first portion of the game with two other rounds. Afterward, contestants compete in the $1,000 Trivia Race, with the higher-scoring team playing the bonus round, also known as the $10,000 Trivia Ladder.

=== First format ===
The team is shown eight TV monitors with two sets of four answers displayed on the two rows of four TV monitors. The team in control chooses one set (top or bottom) and is asked a question, and each member in turn attempts to eliminate a wrong answer while avoiding the correct answer. The turn ends when either all three wrong answers (indicated by targets displayed on the TV monitors) or the correct answer are chosen. The team receives $50 for eliminating one wrong answer, $100 for two, or $300 for all three. A new set of answers is then displayed to replace the ones that had been used, and the other team plays. Two rounds are played in this manner; each team has one turn per round, with the seniors always choosing first. This format remained in place until December 14, 1984 when it was reworked, after a focus group from American Film International indicated that eliminating wrong answers was a format flaw.

=== Second format ===
The reworked format is split into two separate rounds: Fact or Fiction? and the Trivia Trap Round. Fact or Fiction? consists of true-false trivia questions. The previous day's champions selects one of two question packets, and each team member is asked one question worth $25. After all three members answer, the challengers play the other packet. Two sets of questions were played, with the challengers given first choice for the second set. After this round is completed, the team in the lead (or the champions, in case of a tie) plays the Trivia Trap Round first, and has a choice of two categories. After the category is chosen, Eubanks asks a question and four answers are shown. One contestant answers, and each of the other two chooses to agree or disagree. The correct answer awards $200 if all three agreed, $100 if one contestant disagreed, or $50 if two disagreed. If the original answer is incorrect, any contestant who disagreed may then elect to choose the right answer for the same amounts. Two pairs of categories are played, one category per team in each pair.

=== $1,000 Trivia Race ===
Control of this round begins with the team in the lead (if the scores are tied then the champions or if there are two new teams the winner of a coin toss got to start). The team in control choose one of three categories, and each member has one chance to answer a question asked by the host. Correct answers award $100 (after 10 questions are asked, they become $200 each), and retain control of the race; if all three members of the same team get the question wrong, then control is passed to the opposing team. After a category is played, a new one is also drawn to replace it. When a team either answers a question correctly or gains control due to a miss by their opponents, the member after the one who had last given an answer chooses the next category and has the first opportunity to respond. The first team to accumulate $1,000 or more wins the game and advances to the final round.

=== $10,000 Trivia Ladder ===
The three members of the winning team are assigned to positions one, two, and three in descending order of their performance in the Trivia Race. A row of four TV monitors pops up and the first-positioned contestant is shown a set of four answers and has to decide whether to play or pass to the second-positioned contestant, who in turn can either play or pass; a second pass forces the third-positioned contestant to play by default. The host then asks a question, and the contestant in control chooses one answer. A correct response awards $1,000 to that individual contestant and allows them to take part in the final $10,000 question, while a miss eliminates them from the round. Three questions are played in this manner, with the second question initially offered to the higher-ranked contestant who had not answered the first one and the third question given to the last remaining contestant with no option to pass.

Any team members who answered the previous questions correctly are shown a fourth set of answers and asked one more question. If there are two or all three team members playing then they lifted up a cover on their podium which has four buttons and press the button they think is the correct answer or if one team member is playing then the contestant can just say the answer. Team members who answer correctly (the correct answer indicated by a $ sign on the TV monitor) win equal shares of the day's $10,000 grand prize (the entire amount if only contestant answers correctly). If no one answers their individual question correctly, the final question is not played. Any team that plays the Trivia Ladder five times retires undefeated.

== Broadcast history ==
Trivia Trap premiered on October 8, 1984 in ABC's 11:00 AM timeslot, taking over the time period for a house of reruns (like Benson, celebrity Family Feud specials, etc.). That time was home to popular game shows The Price Is Right on CBS and Wheel of Fortune on NBC and struggled as a result. ABC canceled Trivia Trap after six months and 128 episodes; the show's final episode aired on April 5, 1985. The following Monday, All-Star Blitz took over the show's timeslot. Game Show Network aired the show several times over the late 1990s into the late 2000s, while Buzzr aired the first two episodes as part of the "Lost and Found" marathon in September 2017, and the show continued to air on Buzzr until April 2018.

Trivia Trap was the final Mark Goodson-produced game show to have an original format. From then until the acquisition of Goodson's company by the predecessors of FremantleMedia, all of the shows produced by Mark Goodson Productions were revivals of previous series and Trivia Trap was also the last Mark Goodson-produced game show to premiere on ABC until a revival of Match Game premiered in July 1990.
