= Ira Skutch =

American television director, producer and author (1921–2010)

- Born: Ira Skutch Jr. September 12, 1921; New York City, U.S.
- Died: March 16, 2010 (aged 88); Silver Lake, California, U.S.
- Education: Dartmouth College
- Occupations: Director, producer
- Years active: 1942–2008
- Children: 2

Ira Skutch (September 12, 1921 – March 16, 2010) was an American television director, producer, and, in his later years, an author. In the early days of television he produced and directed episodes of Kraft Television Theatre and The Philco Television Playhouse. Skutch also worked as an executive for Goodson-Todman Productions and produced or directed the game shows Play Your Hunch, I've Got a Secret, Match Game, Concentration and many others.

== Early life and education ==
Ira Skutch Jr. was born on September 12, 1921, in New York City. Skutch was the oldest of three children born to parents Ira (1888–1945) and Ethel Skutch. He attended Dartmouth College where he graduated in 1941. Skutch had a younger brother, Robert Skutch, who also graduated from Dartmouth in 1946, and a younger sister Nancy.

== Career ==
=== Start in television ===
Skutch started as a page in New York for the National Broadcasting Company. After a few years at NBC, Skutch became the stage manager on some of NBC's and network television's first regularly scheduled programs beginning with Hour Glass in 1946. Hour Glass was the first regularly scheduled variety series shown on network television.

After the end of Hour Glass in 1947, Skutch went on to become the stage manager of The Philco Television Playhouse. Skutch also worked as stage manager for the NBC shows NBC Television Theater, You Are an Artist and Kraft Television Theatre. Skutch also directed, produced and wrote several episodes of The Philco Television Playhouse.

=== Goodson-Todman Productions ===
In 1957, producer Mark Goodson hired Skutch to be on staff for Goodson-Todman Productions. One of Skutch's earliest work for Mark Goodson and Bill Todman was as a producer on the game show I've Got a Secret. Skutch also was one of several directors on the original NBC version of Match Game from 1962 to 1969 and became most notably the producer and judge of the more memorable CBS version of Match Game from 1973 to 1979, as well as Match Game PM (1975–1981), and the daily syndicated version from 1979 to 1982.

While at Goodson-Todman, Skutch also worked on the set of the game shows Beat the Clock, What's My Line?, Password, Concentration, Tattletales and Blockbusters.

Skutch left Goodson-Todman in 1983, shortly after Mark Goodson formed his own production company, Mark Goodson Productions, after the death of his partner Bill Todman.

== Personal life and death ==
In his later years, Skutch was the author and co-author of several books published between 1990 and 2008 including I Remember Television, The Days of Live and The DuMont Television Network: What Happened? (co-written with Ted Bergmann).

Skutch died on March 16, 2010, after a several year battle with lymphoma at the age of 88. Skutch died at the home of his daughter Lindsay in the neighborhood of Silver Lake, California.

== Filmography ==
=== Director ===
Year	Title	Notes
1950	Beat the Clock	Game show
1951	The Philco Television Playhouse	1 episode
1957	I've Got a Secret	Game show
1957	Two for the Money	1 episode
1971-1975	Password	ABC version
1973-1978	Concentration	Syndicated version
1962-1964	What's My Line?	2 episodes
1963–1969	Match Game	974 episodes
1969-1970	He Said, She Said	All 265 episodes
1970	Beat the Clock	1 episode
1979	Mindreaders	1 episode
1980	Blockbusters	1 episode
1982	Child's Play	All 258 episodes

== Awards and nominations ==
Year	Award	Category	Work	Result
1976	Daytime Emmy Award	Outstanding Game/Audience Participation Show	Match Game	Nominated
1977	Daytime Emmy Award	Outstanding Game/Audience Participation Show	Tattletales	Nominated
1977	Daytime Emmy Award	Outstanding Game/Audience Participation Show	Match Game	Nominated

== Bibliography ==
- Ira Skutch and Delbert Mann (1990). I Remember Television. Scarecrow Press. ISBN 978-0-8108-2271-9.
- Joseph C. Youngerman, David Shepard and Ira Skutch (1996). My Seventy Years at Paramount Studios and the Directors Guild of America (First ed.). Hardcover. ISBN 978-1-8827-6602-4.
- Ira Skutch (1998). Five Directors: The Golden Years of Radio : Based on Interviews with Himan Brown, Axel Gruenberg, Fletcher Markle, Arch Oboler, Robert Lewis Shayon. Scarecrow Press. ISBN 978-0-8108-3483-5.
- Ira Skutch (editor) and Delbert Mann (1998). Looking Back . . . At Live Television & Other Matters. Directors Guild of America. ISBN 978-1-8827-6606-2.
- Ira Skutch (1998). The Days of Live. Scarecrow Press. ISBN 978-0-8108-3492-7.
- Ira Skutch (1999). Making It. Malvern Publishing Company. ISBN 978-0-9479-9384-9.
- Ira Skutch and Joe Harnell (2001). Counterpoint: The Journey of a Music Man. Xlibris Corporation. ISBN 978-0-7388-4989-8.
- Ted Bergmann and Ira Skutch (2002). The DuMont Television Network: What Happened?. Scarecrow Press. ISBN 0-8108-4270-X.
- Wormser, Richard Edward; Skutch, Ira, eds. (2006). How to Become a Complete Nonentity: A Memoir. iUniverse. ISBN 978-0-5953-8467-9.
