= Howard Felsher =

American game show producer (1927–2018)

- Born: October 18, 1927; Perth Amboy, New Jersey
- Died: July 23, 2018 (aged 90); Los Angeles, California
- Occupation: Television producer
- Years active: -1994
- Known for: Family Feud

Howard Felsher (October 18, 1927 – July 23, 2018) was an American game show producer. He produced shows such as Tic Tac Dough, Password, Password Plus, Super Password, He Said, She Said, Concentration, and most notably, Family Feud. Felsher was known as the "Game Show Doctor" in certain circles for his ability to come in and fix a show.

== Author ==
Felsher also wrote a book with Michael Rosen entitled The Press in the Jury Box which has since been retitled Justice, U.S.A. This book deals with the dangers of trying an accused in the press before a trial.

== Politics ==
In 1982, Felsher ran for the Republican nomination to be the congressman from the 26th district of California. He lost in the primary to Harold K. Phillips (who would lose to Howard Berman in the general election).

== Family Feud and Richard Dawson ==
Felsher was best known for his work on the original version of Family Feud.

When the show was rising in popularity in the late 1970s, Felsher noticed that host Richard Dawson's ego was becoming a major issue. Richard Dawson was known to yell and argue with Felsher (sometimes on camera) when Dawson disagreed with calls and judgements made by Felsher. On one occasion, when their friendship was more amicable, Dawson and Felsher switched positions during a question for fun. At one point in 1981, Dawson ordered Felsher to get off the set, which he did. Dawson ultimately had a falling out with Felsher, and in 1982 Family Feud packager Mark Goodson agreed to keep Felsher distant from Dawson by promoting him to executive producer, thereby relieving him of his studio duties, and promoting Cathy Hughart Dawson (Dawson's then daughter-in-law) to producer. Felsher recalled this in the 2002 E! True Hollywood Story on Family Feud.

On the final original Dawson-era episode of Family Feud in 1985, Dawson publicly apologized about any misgivings, disagreements, or brawls he may have had with producers, particularly Felsher. However, according to Felsher, Dawson regretted making the remarks the next day. Dawson ordered his daughter-in-law, the producer, to cut the speech from the show and it was not seen for 14 years until Game Show Network re-aired the episode on December 31, 1999, as part of their "Y2Play" marathon of game show finales.

Felsher is also best known for the only question that was thrown out in the history of Family Feud because someone said one of the answers. During the question "Besides Family Feud, name a Goodson-Todman show, past or present", Felsher said What's My Line when Richard Dawson wanted to know if To Tell the Truth was the longest-running game show ever at the time, which was one of the 4 remaining answers that wasn't answered already(It was the 4th most popular answer, with To Tell the Truth being 5th).

== Quiz show scandal ==
As producer of the TV game show Tic Tac Dough for Jack Barry - Dan Enright productions, Felsher was in charge of all aspects of production including choosing contestants. Sixteen-year-old Kirsten Falke auditioned as a folk singer, but became a contestant on the show. Felsher provided the young singer with answers and hints to win on the show and promised to showcase her singing talent. "I botched it up", reported Kirsten. She requested her categories in the wrong order and walked away with $800.

A grand jury subpoenaed Falke to testify and Felsher implored her to lie. Felsher admitted to congressmen that he urged roughly 30 former show contestants and all of his production staff to lie to the grand jury and that he had lied under oath himself. Felsher estimated that about 75% of Tic Tac Dough nighttime shows had been rigged. Felsher was fired by NBC.

== Personal life ==
Felsher has a son, Andrew Felsher, who has also directed a number of game shows, and currently is an executive at RTL Group, which is the successor company to the Goodson-Todman production company where his shows were produced.

Felsher died on July 23, 2018, at the age of 90.
