= The Better Sex =

- Created by: Mark Goodson; Bill Todman
- Directed by: Paul Alter
- Presented by: Bill Anderson; Sarah Purcell
- Announcer: Gene Wood
- Country of origin: United States
- No. of episodes: 136

Production
- Production locations: The Prospect Studios; Hollywood, California
- Running time: 30 minutes
- Production company: Mark Goodson-Bill Todman Productions

Original release
- Network: ABC
- Release: July 18, 1977 – January 13, 1978

The Better Sex is an American television game show. Two teams, one composed of men and one of women, competed to determine the outcomes of general-knowledge and survey questions. The Mark Goodson-Bill Todman production ran on ABC from July 18, 1977, to January 13, 1978. The show had two hosts, one male and one female; each acted as leader of a team of the appropriate sex. The male host was Bill Anderson and the female host was Sarah Purcell. Gene Wood was the announcer.

== Game play ==
The show pitted two teams of six men and six women in a battle-of-the-sexes elimination game. One member of the team in control was asked a question, either general-knowledge or survey. The contestant was then handed a card which contained the correct answer and a bluff answer. The player's job was to choose which answer to use to try to fool the opposing team/sex. After the contestant made his/her choice, up to three members of the other team decided to either agree or disagree on the answer. Only two could agree or disagree and once they did, the correct answer was then revealed. If the two players made an incorrect judgment, they were knocked out of the game. If they made a correct judgment, they stayed in the game and the player offering the answer was knocked out along with a teammate of the opposing team's choice; additionally, that team took control of the next question. When a team was down to two players and could not agree whether an answer was correct or a bluff, the first player was given the option to change his/her judgment, or stay with his/her original choice.

The first team to eliminate the other won the game, $1,000, and a chance to play for $5,000 in the bonus game.

=== Bonus game ===
In the bonus game, the winning team faced 30 members of the opposite sex in the studio audience. One at a time, each team member was asked a question, then was handed a card which showed the correct answer only. The contestant could use that answer or come up with a bluff of his or her own. After the player gave an answer, the audience members then voted to agree or disagree on the answer. Each audience member held a paddle-shaped electronic device which displayed their choice. The correct answer was then revealed, and any audience members who voted wrong (or failed to cast a vote in the allotted time) were eliminated and sat down.

Play continued until all six questions were played. If any audience members were left standing, the team lost and the audience survivors split $500. However, if all 30 audience members were knocked out in up to six questions, the winning team split $5,000.

Teams stayed on the show until they lost twice or accrued at least $20,000 in total winnings. By December 1977, it increased to $30,000.

== Music ==
The theme song is called "Hormonal Imbalance", composed by John F. Grimbsy for Score Productions.

== Broadcast history ==
The show aired at noon ET/11:00 am CT/MT/PT, replacing Second Chance. It aired opposite The Young and the Restless on CBS and initially two NBC game shows: Shoot for the Stars then To Say the Least. In January 1978, when both One Life to Live and General Hospital expanded from 45 minutes to an hour, the series was placed on hiatus; The $20,000 Pyramid took over the time slot. The show was ultimately canceled by ABC later that year. In 1998, Game Show Network used this show for an episode of their comedy series Faux Pause. On September 30, 2018, Buzzr aired two episodes as part of their annual "Lost & Found" series of specials. The status of this show is unknown. The pilot and finale exist among traders. Three general episodes have aired on GSN and on Buzzr.

== International versions ==
Country	Local name	Host	Co-host	Channel	Premiere	Finale
Australia	The Better Sex	Mike Preston	Ann Sidney	STW-9	1978	1978
France	Question de charme	Georges Beller	Daniela Lumbroso	Antenne 2	July 29, 1991	February 7, 1992
Italy	Il sesso forte	Enrica Bonaccorti	Michele Gammino	Rete 2	May 29, 1978	October 16, 1978
Italy	Adamo contro Eva	Gerry Scotti	No Co-host	Rete 4	October 2, 1995	November 3, 1995
Netherlands	De Betere Sexe	Ruud ter Weijden	Sandra Reemer	RTL 4	1990	1990
Scotland	The Better Sex	Jack McLaughlin	Lesley Blair	STV	February 17, 1978	May 12, 1978
United Kingdom	Who's Bluffing Who?	Ulrika Jonsson	Richard Cartridge	BBC1	May 20, 1991	May 31, 1991
Wales	Ni a Nhw	Kevin Davies	Mari Gwilym	S4C	September 15, 1986	December 8, 1986
Wales	Cafflo	Gareth Roberts	Gwyneth Hopkins	S4C	May 12, 1988	September 1, 1988
