= Tattletales =

American television game show

- Created by: Ira Skutch
- Directed by: Paul Alter
- Presented by: Bert Convy
- Announcer: Jack Clark; John Harlan; Gene Wood; Johnny Olson
- Composers: Edd Kalehoff; Jonathan Segal
- Country of origin: United States
- Original language: English
- No. of episodes: 1,036 (1974–78; CBS); 30 (1977–78; Weekly Syndication); 582 (1982–84; CBS)

Production
- Executive producers: Ira Skutch (1974–1978); Paul Alter (1983–1984)
- Producers: Paul Alter (1974–1978); Mimi O' Brien (1983–1984); Robert Sherman (1983–1984)
- Production location: Television City Studios
- Running time: approx. 22–26 minutes
- Production companies: Mark Goodson-Bill Todman Productions (1974–78, 1982–84); Mark Goodson Productions (1984); Panel Productions (1974–78); The Tattletale Company (1982–84)

Original release
- Network: CBS (1974–78, 1982–84); Syndicated (weekly, 1977–78)
- Release: February 18, 1974 – March 31, 1978
- Release: January 18, 1982 – June 1, 1984

Tattletales is an American game show produced by Goodson-Todman Productions. The program had two runs on the CBS daytime schedule between February 1974 and June 1984. It was hosted by Bert Convy, with several announcers including Jack Clark, Gene Wood, Johnny Olson and John Harlan providing the voiceover at various times. Clark was the first primary announcer for the first year, with Harlan and Olson filling in before Wood becoming the primary announcer in early 1975 during the show's first run, and Olson was announcing during the 1980s.

The show's premise involved questions asked about celebrity couples' personal lives and was based on He Said, She Said, a syndicated Goodson-Todman show hosted by Joe Garagiola that aired during the 1969–70 season, which in itself was based on an unsold 1966 pilot called It Had to Be You that was hosted by Ed McMahon, which featured four regular couples who were not celebrities.

== Host ==
Bert Convy was awarded a Daytime Emmy Award for hosting the show in 1977. Convy and his wife, Anne, occasionally played the game during the 1970s run, most often during weeks in which the panel was made up entirely of other game show hosts and their spouses. Among the hosts who filled in for Convy during these episodes were Gene Rayburn, Bob Barker, Bobby Van, Jack Narz and Richard Dawson. All five hosts also participated in playing the game along with other hosts such as Allen Ludden, Monty Hall, Bill Cullen and Chuck Woolery.

== Game play ==
The show changed its format after its first four months on the air. The second format remained for the rest of the show's run, including its later versions.

Production for Tattletales was set up at Hollywood's Television City in either Stages 31, 41, 43. In both formats, the show's set consisted of two parts. One was a desk behind which three players could sit. The other was a small seating area in the upstage right corner of the stage, which was used to keep the players not in the game isolated; a sliding wall covered the seating area during game play and each player had a set of headphones to block out any noise from the other side of the wall. Usually, the game began with the husbands isolated and the wives onstage. When needed, the offstage players would appear on monitors in front of their spouses.

The studio audience was divided into three color-coded sections: red, yellow (which Convy jokingly nicknamed the "banana section"), and blue, each section of 100 members rooting for one celebrity couple. Audience members in each section divided the money their respective couples won. The couple with the most money at the end of the show won the game, earning their section a $1,000 bonus. In the event of a tie, the winning sections divided the $1,000 bonus. A member of the winning section was also randomly drawn to win additional prizes. Audience members received their winnings in checks distributed as they left the studio.

=== Format No. 1 ===
In the first format, Convy asked the players onstage two questions, which usually started with "It happened at..." or "A story involving..." and then Convy completed the question. After each question was read, a player onstage buzzed-in to answer the question. That player then gave a one- or two-word clue that the spouse would recognize. Convy then repeated the question to the offstage players, appearing on the monitors in front of their spouses, followed by the clue. The offstage player who buzzed in first answered the question, and if the couple's answers matched, they won money for their rooting section.

A correct answer was worth $100 with a one-word clue, and $50 with a two-word clue. Convy then asked another question, usually multiple choice, called a "Tattletale Quickie," to each couple in-turn. On their turn, each onstage player answered the question, and the spouse appeared and answered the same question. If the answers matched, the team won $100. The players changed places in the second round.

=== Format No. 2 ===
In June 1974, the game dropped the first type of question, and questions in the "Tattletale Quickies" format were used for the entire show (though the "Quickies" name was dropped). The scoring format also changed. Each question had a pot of $150, split among all couples who matched ($50 if all three matched, $75 if two matched and $150 if only one couple matched). If no one matched, the amount of the pot was added to the next question. The husbands were first asked two questions, after which the players changed places prior to the second round. The wives were then asked two more questions, with the value of the final question doubled to $300. In addition to the same scoring format, on syndicated episodes one member of the winning rooting sections chosen at random received six different parting gifts.

During the 1982-84 run, sometimes the show would feature weeks with celebrities and their adult children; or co-stars of daytime dramas.

== Broadcast history ==
CBS placed Tattletales at 4:00 PM (Eastern Time Zone)/3:00 PM (Central Time Zone/Mountain Time Zone/Pacific Time Zone) when it premiered, replacing the long-running soap opera The Secret Storm. It formed the last third of an afternoon game show block that also included The Price Is Right and Match Game '74.

The show changed time slots three times in 1975. On June 16, CBS moved it to 11:00/10:00 AM. On August 11, after The Price Is Right returned to the morning, Tattletales moved to 3:30/2:30 PM. On December 1, it returned to its original time slot.

On December 12, 1977, CBS moved Tattletales to the 10:00/9:00 AM in a scheduling shuffle with The Price Is Right and Match Game '77. Tattletales gradually began to lose viewers and ran its 1,075th and final show of the original version on March 31, 1978. It was replaced by Pass the Buck. A weekly nighttime version, syndicated by Firestone aired during the 1977–78 season, but was not renewed.

In 1981, CBS asked Mark Goodson to bring Tattletales back, and it returned on January 18, 1982, replacing the low-rated news show Up to the Minute. It aired at 4:00/3:00 PM until June 1, 1984, when it was replaced by another Goodson show, Body Language.

On March 12, 2021, the streaming service HBO Max announced that it had ordered a reboot of Tattletales, which would be produced by Ayesha and Stephen "Steph" Curry, and feature celebrity couples playing for charity. Fremantle stated that the reboot would also feature physical challenges and viewer-submitted questions. However, on August 23, 2021, it was announced that the show would be retitled to About Last Night, with an initial premiere set for fall 2021. In January 2022, it was announced that it would premiere on February 10, 2022. In August 2022, the series was removed from HBO Max.

== Episode status ==
Both versions of Tattletales remain intact, but only a portion have been seen on Game Show Network: episodes of the CBS run from 1974 to 1978 and several months of the 1982–84 run. GSN never reran the nighttime syndicated version. Episodes of the 1974–1977 daytime version of Tattletales can currently be seen on Buzzr.

Two episodes of the nighttime syndicated version aired on Buzzr on February 9, 2020, as part of their "Love at First Sight" marathon.

== International versions ==
An Australian version of Tattletales aired on the Seven Network as Celebrity Tattle Tales, hosted by Ugly Dave Gray for a brief time in 1980, and was produced by Reg Grundy. The show was cancelled after being on the air for only three months. Each of the first five questions was worth $60 with one $120 question to follow.

A Brazilian version of Tattletales ran on Sistema Brasileiro de Televisão from 1975 to 1986 under the name Ela Disse, Ele Disse ("She said, He said") hosted by Silvio Santos.

Country	Name	Host	Network	Date premiered
Australia	Celebrity Tattle Tales	Ugly Dave Gray	Seven Network	1980
Brazil	Ela Disse, Ele Disse	Silvio Santos	SBT	1975–1986

== In popular culture ==
A spoof of the show aired on a 1977 episode of SCTV; called 'Celebrity TattleTales', the segment (a commercial for the show) featured Prince Philip (Joe Flaherty) and Queen Elizabeth (Catherine O'Hara) being asked a question by Bert Convy (played by Eugene Levy).
