= Mindreaders =

American television game show

- Mindreaders title logo.
- Created by: Mark Goodson; Bill Todman
- Directed by: Ira Skutch
- Presented by: Dick Martin
- Narrated by: Johnny Olson
- Theme music composer: Score Productions
- Country of origin: United States
- No. of episodes: 109

Production
- Producer: Mimi O'Brien
- Production locations: Studio 4, NBC Studios, Burbank, California
- Running time: 22 minutes

Original release
- Network: NBC
- Release: August 13, 1979 – January 11, 1980

Mindreaders is an American game show produced by Goodson-Todman Productions that aired on NBC from August 13, 1979, through January 11, 1980. Although NBC originally agreed to a 26-week run, the network canceled Mindreaders after 22 weeks. The host was Dick Martin and the announcer was Johnny Olson, with Jack Narz subbing. The program was taped at Studio 4 at NBC in Burbank, California.

Mindreaders was also the final new Goodson-Todman game to be developed under the supervision of co-producer Bill Todman, who died a few weeks before its premiere.

== Gameplay ==
Two teams of four members competed, each consisting of three contestants and a celebrity captain; one team consisted only of men, the other only of women. All questions used on the show were of the yes/no type.

=== Main game ===
The host read a question to the three contestants on one team, and each of them locked in an answer. The captain predicted how each of his/her teammates answered, one at a time. Each correct prediction kept the team in control, but a miss allowed the captain of the opposing team to predict the responses given by any remaining members of the controlling team. Each correct response awarded $50 to the team of the captain who gave it, while each miss gave the money to their opponents. Control alternated between teams on each new question. The first team to reach $300 won the game and advanced to the bonus round; both teams kept any money earned in the game.

=== Bonus round ===
The bonus round was played in two parts.

==== Judge the Jury ====
A "jury" of 10 randomly selected audience members participated in this round. Martin read a question, for which the jury members secretly locked in their answers, and one contestant on the winning team had to predict how many of them had given a specified response. The team won $500 for an exact guess, and $200 for being within two persons either way. Each contestant had one turn in this round; if none of them won any money on their turn, the bonus game ended immediately.

==== Celebrity Turnabout ====
Each of the three contestants separately predicted how their captain answered one last question. If at least two of them guessed correctly, the team's "Judge the Jury" winnings were multiplied by 10, for a potential maximum of $15,000.

=== Returning champions ===
Unlike most game shows of that time, Mindreaders did not use the typical "returning champions" carry-over; instead, the same two teams competed against each other for three consecutive games, after which all six contestants retired. Each team's total winnings were divided equally among its three contestants.

=== 1975 pilot ===
A pilot episode was recorded in 1975, with Jack Clark as host and Olson as announcer. Six celebrity panelists (three male and three female) took part in a contest between two civilian contestants, a returning champion and a challenger. On each turn, the host asked a yes/no question to the studio audience of 100 people, who secretly locked in their answers on keypads. Two panelists were chosen to guess the number of "yes" responses, and the contestant in control for that turn chose the number he/she thought was closer to the actual total. The other number was given to the opponent by default. The actual total was revealed, and the contestant with the closer guess won $100 and could score up to $300 more on a second question that had been previously asked to the panelists. Three of them were chosen, and the winner of the audience question tried to predict how they had responded, one at a time. Each correct guess awarded $100, but a miss awarded both the money and control of any remaining predictions to the opponent. Contestants alternated control for every new audience question, starting with the challenger.

The first to reach $500 won the game, kept the money, and advanced to the "Mindreaders Sweep" bonus round. One of the six panelists was secretly designated as the day's "Lucky Star." They were all asked one final question; once they had all locked in their responses, the champion tried to guess how they had answered, one at a time. Each correct prediction awarded $500, and doing so for the Lucky Star (revealed only after the round was over) awarded a further $5,000, for a potential total of $8,000.

=== Theme Song ===
The theme song provided by Score Productions was a re-arranged version of a commercial cue for Celebrity Charades hosted by Jay Johnson and his puppet partner Squeaky earlier in 1979, and the Mindreaders arrangement was later recycled for the unsold pilot Puzzlers hosted by future and former host of Wheel of Fortune Pat Sajak in 1980 and the short-lived, Canadian game show Claim to Fame, produced by Carleton Productions in association with Goodson-Todman Productions, hosted by Mike McManus, airing on CTV from 1981 until 1982.
