= Concentration (game show) =

American television game show

- Also known as: Classic Concentration
- Created by: Jack Barry; Dan Enright; Robert Noah; Buddy Piper
- Directed by: Van Fox; Ted Nathanson; Gertrude Rosenstein; Lynwood King; Bob Hultgren; Ira Skutch; Marc Breslow
- Presented by: Hugh Downs; Jack Barry; Bob Clayton; Ed McMahon; Jack Narz; Alex Trebek
- Starring: Paola Diva; Diana Taylor; Marjorie Goodson-Cutt
- Announcer: Bill McCord; Art James; Jim Lucas; Bob Clayton; Wayne Howell; Johnny Olson; Gene Wood
- Ending theme: "Concentration Theme" by Paul Taubman (1958–1967) "Fast-Break" by Edd Kalehoff for Score Productions (1973–1978) "Classic Concentration Theme" by Paul Epstein for Score Productions (1987–1991)
- Country of origin: United States
- No. of seasons: 15 (1958–1973); 5 (1973–1978); 4 (1987–1991)
- No. of episodes: 3,770 (1958–1973); 975 (1973–1978); 1,090 (1987–1991)

Production
- Executive producers: Norm Blumenthal; Chester Feldman; Howard Felsher
- Production locations: NBC Studios; New York City (1958–1973); Metromedia Square; Hollywood, California (1973–1978); NBC Studios; Burbank, California (1987–1991)
- Camera setup: Multi-camera
- Running time: 22–26 minutes
- Production companies: Jack Barry-Dan Enright Productions (1958); NBC (1958–1973); Mark Goodson-Bill Todman Productions (1973–1978); Mark Goodson Productions (1987–1991)

Original release
- Network: NBC
- Release: August 25, 1958 – March 23, 1973
- Network: Syndication
- Release: September 10, 1973 – September 8, 1978
- Network: NBC
- Release: May 4, 1987 – August 30, 1991

Concentration is an American television game show based on the children's memory game of the same name. It was created by Jack Barry and Dan Enright, with music composed by Milton Kaye. Contestants match the names of prizes hidden behind spaces on a game board, which then reveal portions of a rebus puzzle for the contestants to solve.

The show was broadcast on and off from 1958 to 1991, presented by various hosts, and has been made in several different versions. The original network daytime series, Concentration, appeared on NBC for 14 years, 7 months, and 3,770 telecasts (August 25, 1958 – March 23, 1973), the longest continuous run of any game show on that network. This series was hosted by Hugh Downs and later by Bob Clayton, but for a six-month period in 1969, Ed McMahon hosted the series. The series began at 11:30 am Eastern, then moved to 11:00 and finally to 10:30. Nearly all episodes of the NBC daytime version were produced at 30 Rockefeller Plaza, New York City.

A weekly nighttime version appeared in two separate broadcast runs: the first aired from October 30 to November 20, 1958, with Jack Barry as host, while the second ran from April 24 to September 18, 1961, with Downs as host. The second version of Concentration, the first to be made in Southern California, ran in syndication from September 10, 1973, to September 8, 1978, with Jack Narz as host. The last version of the show to air was Classic Concentration, which ran on NBC from May 4, 1987 to August 30, 1991. Alex Trebek was the host of this version, with Diana Taylor and Marjorie Goodson-Cutt as models.

== Gameplay ==
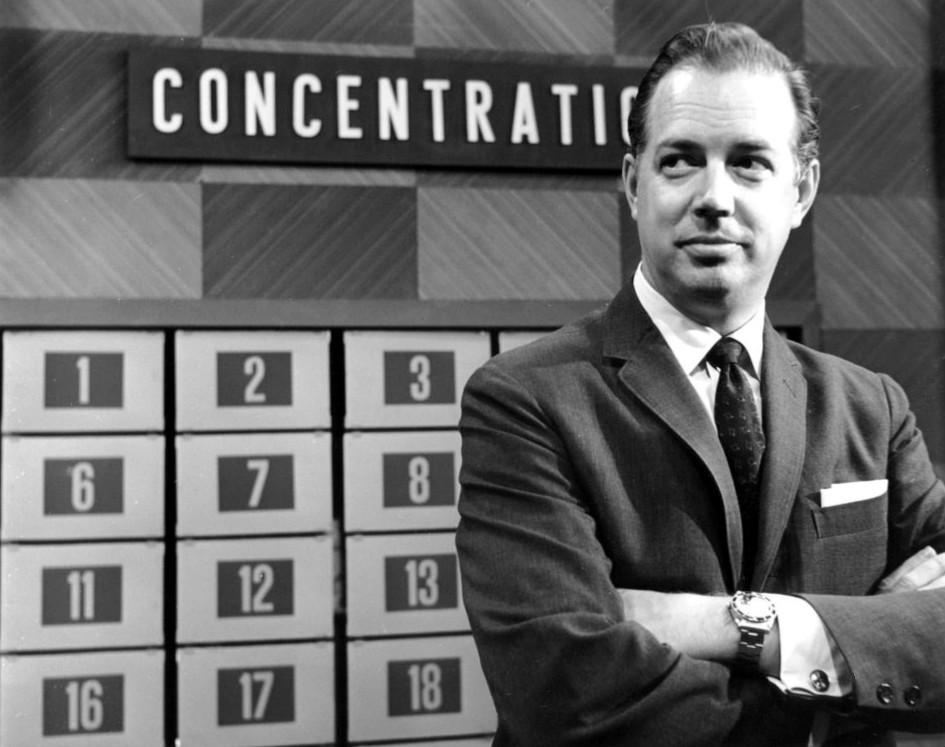
Hugh Downs at the game board in 1961

Two contestants compete to reveal portions of a rebus puzzle, which they then attempt to solve. The rebus uses a variety of pictures and letters to phonetically communicate a person, place, thing, title, or idea. Plus signs connect sounds within the same word. For example, "French dressing" would be represented by the letter F and an illustration of a wrench ("F + wrench"), followed by an illustration of a dress and a person singing ("dress + sing"). The original version of the show featured rebus designs by Norm Blumenthal, while Classic Concentration had its rebuses designed by Steve Ryan.

The rebus is concealed behind a game board consisting of 30 trilons. As in the card game of the same name, the spaces conceal matching pairs of items. Most pairs are the names of prizes, while some are special instructions that alter gameplay. A contestant begins the game by selecting any two squares on the board. If both squares contain the name of the same prize, the contestant claims that prize and those squares are turned over to reveal a portion of the underlying rebus. After making a match, a contestant may choose to pick two more squares or attempt to solve the rebus. Failing to match passes control to the opposing contestant.

In addition to prizes, the board contains two "wild card" spaces, which may be matched to any prize or award a cash bonus if both are revealed in the same turn. Also present are two "take one gift" and six "forfeit one gift" spaces; if these are matched, then the contestant must respectively take a prize from, or pass a prize to, the opponent. Correctly solving the rebus awards any prizes accumulated, or $100 cash if no prizes are accumulated before solving.

=== Differences with later series ===
==== 1973 syndicated series ====
The syndicated series had some variations on gameplay. One saw the addition of spaces marked "bonus number". If these were matched, the contestant that did so was allowed to call an extra number on the next turn if the first two selections did not match. Later in the show's run, some games were played where both contestants were allowed to call three numbers if the first two did not match, and even further still, some games also included spaces marked "free look", which automatically revealed the rebus piece hidden behind it and gave the contestant a chance to guess.

The winner of each game would play a new bonus round called Double Play. Contestants were given ten seconds to correctly solve two rebuses, with the first paying $100 and the second being played for a larger prize. For most of the syndicated series' run, the larger prize was a car. Beginning in 1977, contestants would be shown a nine-square board with four matching prizes, one of which was the car, and a wild card concealed behind them. The first prize matched was the one that the contestant would play for with the second puzzle, and with the wild card resulting in an automatic match it meant that the possibility existed for a contestant to win multiple prizes if more than one had not been matched when the wild card was found.

If time permitted on certain episodes, either one of two things would happen. Provided there was enough time to get it in, a third game would be played for cash. Various foreign currency amounts were placed on the board, and the contestant that solved the puzzle would receive the value of all the currencies matched converted to American dollars. Other times when the show needed to stretch for time, the two contestants got a chance to win $50 each by solving their own Double Play puzzle within the ten second time limit.

==== Classic Concentration ====
Classic Concentration was played on a 25-square, computer-generated board. The take and forfeit cards were removed from the board, and a total of three wild cards were placed on each board, with $500 cash awarded for matching them and an additional $500 awarded if the contestant found all three in one turn. In place of the take cards, two spaces marked "TAKE!" were placed on the board and, if they were matched, contestants would be given a token that enabled them to remove one prize from the opponent's board. There were originally one pair of these cards on the board, marked in green, with a pair marked in red added later; unlike the take cards in earlier series, the contestants were not required to use the tokens immediately.

Winning contestants played the bonus round in the "winner's circle" for one of eight cars displayed on the stage. The winner was presented with a fifteen-square board, on which seven of the eight cars had matching pairs, and was given 35 seconds to match all seven cars. If successful, the contestant won the last car matched. If not, five additional seconds were added to the clock for each subsequent bonus round that a contestant did not win a car.

Originally, contestants were retired immediately upon a loss. In July 1988, the format was changed so that the first contestant to solve two puzzles would win the match. One further change was made in June 1990, where contestants could stay until either winning the bonus round or losing twice in the main game. Coinciding with this change was a new rule in the bonus round; each new champion started with 35 seconds in the round regardless of whether or not the previous champion had won the round or not.

== NBC (1958–1973) ==
Concentration was originally slated to debut on NBC on July 28, 1958, but its debut ended up being delayed until August 25, 1958. Concentration was first hosted by Hugh Downs, who was also the announcer for Tonight Starring Jack Paar and working as one of the NBC Radio Monitor staff. Concentration was broadcast at the time that Truth or Consequences had been aired; NBC moved Truth or Consequences to its afternoon schedule.

Concentration remains the longest-running game show on NBC and held the record for longest continuous daytime run on network television until it was eclipsed in March 1987 by the CBS daytime version of The Price Is Right (beginning September 4, 1972). Concentration is currently the sixth longest-running daytime/syndicated game show behind The Price Is Right and the syndicated versions of Wheel of Fortune (1983–present), Jeopardy! (1984–present), Family Feud (1999–present), and Who Wants to Be a Millionaire (2002-2019).

Concentration was an NBC in-house production, apart from the earliest episodes. As a result of the 1950s quiz scandals, the network purchased the rights to Concentration and three other games (Twenty-One, Dough Re Mi and Tic-Tac-Dough) from producers Barry and Enright. NBC/Universal still holds exclusive rights to both the format and extant episodes of Concentration; however, due to Financial Interest and Syndication Rules, this version is owned by CBS Media Ventures.

The show was produced and broadcast live at 11:30 am Eastern on weekdays in black-and-white, and quickly became the most-watched daytime series in NBC's lineup. The announcer was Art James, who sometimes served as a substitute host and later became a game show host in his own right. The series was produced in NBC's Studio 3A which now houses NBC News and MSNBC.

In 1958 and 1961, the show had two brief runs in prime time: one hosted by Jack Barry, the other by Downs.

The series then moved to 11:00 am and slowly introduced color broadcasts. For a picture puzzle game whose rebuses were designed and painted in monochrome, this required some design changes: The colors of the numbered cards might otherwise interfere with the colors used on the rebus, a critical issue for contestants playing in the studio and for viewers who played along at home. During this period, the series was produced in NBC's Studio 6A. Hugh Downs, by this time also an anchor correspondent on NBC's Today Show, remained host, and the announcer became Jim Lucas, who also worked on NBC's local New York radio station, WNBC (AM). In September 1965, the show moved to 10:30 am where it would spend the remainder of its run on NBC. The show fully converted to color on November 7, 1966.

In January 1969, Downs stepped down to devote his entire attention to Today. Bob Clayton, who had succeeded Jim Lucas as announcer, took over the hosting duties; he was introduced as the new host at the program's 1968 Christmas episode, dressed as Santa Claus. NBC staffer Wayne Howell moved to the announcer's booth during Clayton's tenure as host. However, in March, advertiser pressure led NBC to set Clayton aside in favor of Ed McMahon; after viewer complaints and declining ratings, Clayton returned in September and remained host until the series ended on March 23, 1973. (On the Monday following Concentration's cancellation, Clayton became the announcer for The $10,000 Pyramid on CBS.)

=== Cancellation ===
For most of its run, Concentration faced sitcom reruns on CBS and local programming on ABC affiliates, easily dominating them in the ratings. However, in September 1972, CBS launched The New Price Is Right at 10:30/9:30 and drained off more than half of the Concentration audience. Rather than move the game, NBC concluded that it had reached the end of its life and cancelled it in March 1973.

While the first puzzle on the debut was "It Happened One Night", the last puzzle on the finale was "You've Been More Than Kind". After Clayton said a final goodbye, the credits rolled over a rendition of "Auld Lang Syne".

Baffle, a Merrill Heatter-Bob Quigley production hosted by Dick Enberg, replaced it at that time slot and ran until March 29, 1974.

== Syndication (1973–1978) ==
Five months after NBC canceled Concentration, the network called upon Mark Goodson-Bill Todman Productions to produce a new edition of the series for syndication. This marked the first time Goodson-Todman was asked to produce a format owned by another production company; each of their previous productions were conceived by people on their own staff.

The series was distributed by Jim Victory Television, led by Jim Victory, a former executive of NBC Films since 1971, who got the rights to the series, and took the property with them.

The new syndicated Concentration premiered on September 10, 1973, and ran for five years. Jack Narz was host, with Johnny Olson serving as announcer. This version of Concentration was produced at Metromedia Square in Hollywood, and aired primarily on NBC stations that had carried the original series. It was produced as a daily series but at the time, many game shows aired once per week in syndication and some stations airing Concentration aired it in this manner as well.

=== Buzzr ===
On March 6, 2020, Buzzr announced that reruns of the Narz version, starting with 1976 episodes, would air on their network starting on March 30.

== Classic Concentration (1987–1991) ==
The Classic Concentration logo

In 1985, Mark Goodson Productions sought permission from NBC to relaunch Concentration. The new series, which eventually became known as Classic Concentration, debuted on NBC on May 4, 1987. Production was now done at NBC Studios in Burbank, California. Alex Trebek (who concurrently was also hosting Jeopardy!) hosted, and Diana Taylor was the prize model. On July 22 of that year, Taylor was replaced with Mark Goodson's daughter, Marjorie Goodson-Cutt, who remained for the rest of the series. Gene Wood was the announcer, with Art James substituting for him on the July 9–31, 1991 episodes. The new Concentration ran once again at 10:30 am EST and remained in that slot for its entire run. Classic Concentration's final new episode aired on August 30, 1991, but reruns continued to air on NBC from October 28, 1991 until December 31, 1993, including a three-week period from September 2 to 20.

== Home games ==
The Milton Bradley Company introduced the first commercial version of Concentration in 1958 and subsequently released 24 editions of the game until 1982. Owing to common superstition, these releases were numbered 1–12 and 14–25, skipping 13. It was tied with Password as the most prolific of Milton Bradley's home versions of popular game shows, and was produced well after the Jack Narz era ended in 1978 (albeit without ever including elements from that version).

Pressman Games published two editions of the Classic Concentration home game in 1988. More recently, Endless Games has released two versions of Concentration since 1998. The Endless versions were modeled similar to Classic Concentration home game with the rebuses designed by Steve Ryan, who created puzzles for Classic Concentration.

Two computer versions of Classic Concentration were released by Softie for MS-DOS systems, as well as the Apple II and Commodore 64. A Nintendo Entertainment System version was also released by GameTek. Tiger Electronics also marketed a hand-held version of the game in 1999 using the Narz-era theme and the 1960s–1978 logo. The computer versions largely play similar to the Trebek-hosted show, but lack the "TAKE!" cards.

In 1991, the book Classic Concentration: The Game, The Show, The Puzzles, written by the show's puzzle designer Steve Ryan (and plugged on the air), was released. The book features 152 puzzles that were used on the show; the first 48 puzzles are exposed in their entirety, whereas the remaining 104 are first presented partially revealed on one page, then fully revealed on the next, with all puzzle solutions featured in the back of the book. The book also features a detailed history of Concentration and an introduction by executive producer Mark Goodson.

A video slot machine based on the 1958–1973 version was released for American casinos by Bally Gaming Systems.

In 2007, Reflexive Arcade released a downloadable version of Concentration based on the Classic Concentration format and bonus round with newer puzzles and prizes. In 2008, Glu Mobile released a mobile version of Concentration based on the PC downloadable version, with the look of the original 1958–1973 series.

== Episode status ==
Some kinescope recordings of the 1958–1973 version are held at the Library of Congress. Shokus Video (a service specializing primarily in public domain offerings) offers a Hugh Downs-hosted tournament episode from 1967. Meanwhile The Paley Center for Media has a handful of kinescope recordings as well as two color videotape episodes, one from January 13, 1971 and one from October 17, 1972. The first five minutes of the July 23, 1971, episode are available to watch on YouTube.

Buzzr currently airs episodes of Classic Concentration and the 1970s syndicated version of Concentration starting with episodes from 1976.

== International versions ==
Concentration is one of only three Barry & Enright game shows known to have foreign adaptations, the others being Tic-Tac-Dough and Twenty-One.

Complete table of foreign versions of Concentration
Country	Title(s)	Network(s)	Host(s)	Dates aired
Australia	Concentration	Nine Network	Philip Brady	1959–1967
Australia	Concentration	Seven Network	Lionel Williams	1970
Australia	Match Mates	Nine Network	David Waters	1981–1982
Australia	Concentration	Seven Network	Mike Hammond	1997
Colombia	Concéntrese	Primera Cadena/Cadena Uno; Cadena 2/Canal A	Julio E. Sánchez Vanegas	1967–1969; 1984–1986; 1996–2000
Germany	Gewusst-Wo...	ARD	Guido Baumann	1959–1960
Germany	Gewusst-Wo...	ARD 2	Karl-Heinz Bender	1961
Italy	Caccia al numero	Secondo Programma	Mike Bongiorno	1962
Italy	Bis	Canale 5	Mike Bongiorno	1981–1990
New Zealand	Concentration	TV2	Nick Adrian; Jim Jameson	1975–1976
United Kingdom	Concentration	ITV	Barry McQueen; Chris Howland; David Gell	1959–1960
United Kingdom	Concentration	ITV	Nick Jackson; Bob Carolgees	1988–1990
Vietnam	Trúc xanh			
Vietnam	Trúc xanh	HTV7	Đỗ Thụy	2003–2007
