= Chester Feldman =

American TV show producer

- Feldman appearing on I've Got a Secret in 1964
- Born: January 8, 1926; The Bronx, New York, U.S.
- Died: May 25, 1997 (aged 71); New York City, New York, U.S.
- Occupation: Television producer
- Years active: 1948–1995

Chester Feldman (January 8, 1926 – May 25, 1997) was an American producer of game shows born in The Bronx, New York, who was also associated with Mark Goodson Productions.

== Biography ==
Before beginning his career in television, Feldman served in the Navy during World War II. After the war, he attended the University of Missouri where he earned a degree in journalism. Feldman first began his career as a radio producer. He later moved to television where he produced I've Got a Secret, Card Sharks (in which he created and was a creative consultant for the British version, Play Your Cards Right for the first series) and many other game shows.

On May 25, 1997, Feldman died of complications following surgery at New York Hospital in New York City.
