= The Burbank Studios =

Television production facility in Burbank, California

Coordinates: 34°09′14″N 118°20′01″W

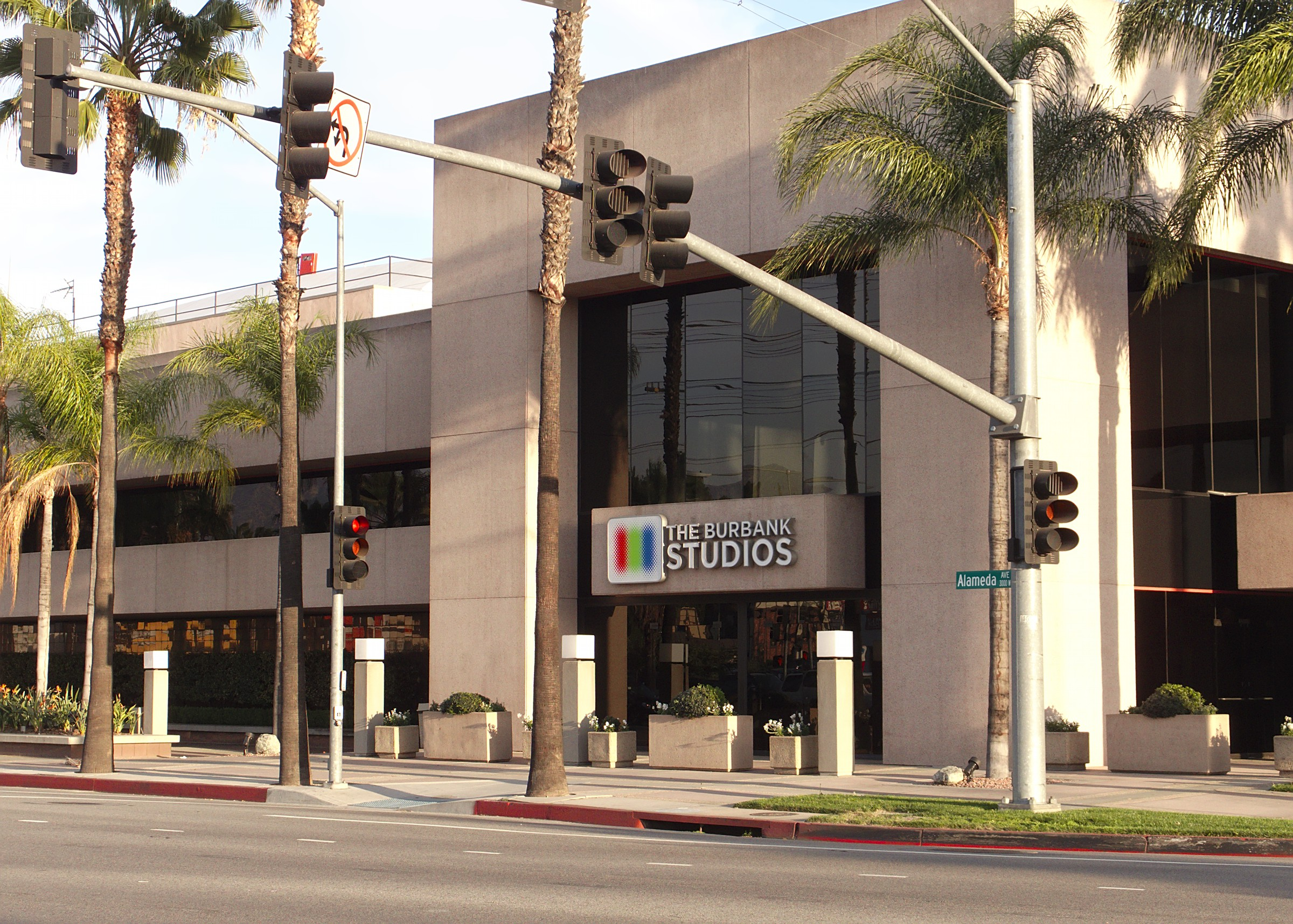
- Former names: NBC Studios (1952–2014)

General information
- Status: Completed
- Type: Television Studios Complex
- Location: 3000 West Alameda Avenue; Burbank, California; 91505
- Completed: 1952
- Owner: NBC (1952–2008); Worthe Real Estate Group (2008–2023); Warner Bros. Discovery (2023–2024); Worthe Real Estate Group, QuadReal Property Group, Stockbridge Capital Group (2024–present)

Technical details
- Floor count: 6

Design and construction
- Developer: Radio Corporation of America

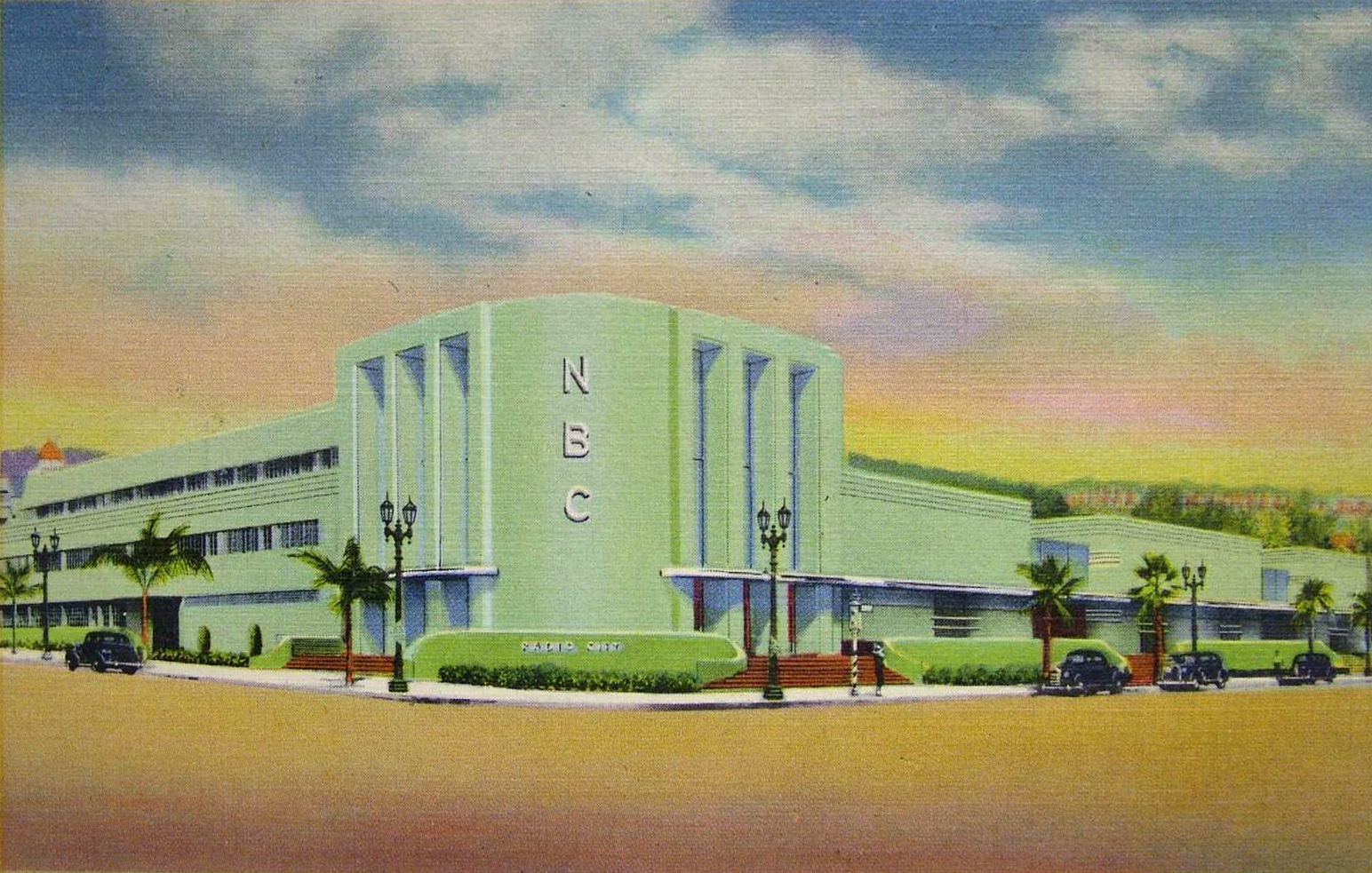
NBC Radio City Hollywood was located at Sunset Boulevard and Vine Street in Hollywood, 1937–1962; in 1968, it was replaced by Home Savings and Loan headquarters.

The Burbank Studios (formerly known as NBC Studios) is a television production facility located in Burbank, California, United States. The studio is home to Days of Our Lives, Extra, the IHeartRadio Theater, and was formerly home to Blizzard Arena (home of the Overwatch League).

== History ==
=== NBC Radio City Hollywood ===
NBC Radio City Hollywood, located at Sunset Boulevard and Vine Street in Hollywood, opened in 1938 and served as headquarters to the NBC Radio Networks' West Coast operations. It served as a replacement for NBC Radio City San Francisco, which had been in service since 1942. Since NBC never owned a radio station in Los Angeles, the network's West Coast programming originated from its San Francisco station (KPO, which later became KNBC, and is now KNBR). NBC radio network programming was carried on KFI in Los Angeles.

The architect for the distinctive Streamline Moderne building at Sunset and Vine was John C. Austin.

In January 1949, NBC launched its newest television station for Los Angeles, KNBH (Channel 4; now KNBC) from Radio City; the radio studios were later equipped for live television broadcasting in the transition phase from radio broadcasting. However, as television production was increasing for NBC, the network and its then-parent the Radio Corporation of America, decided to build a television studio, nicknamed NBC Color City, that would be exclusively equipped for color television broadcasting. For many of the same reasons why CBS eventually built Television City in the early 1950s to replace its Columbia Square, the television facilities at Radio City gradually became too small for NBC to produce its television broadcasts.

=== NBC Color City Studios Burbank ===
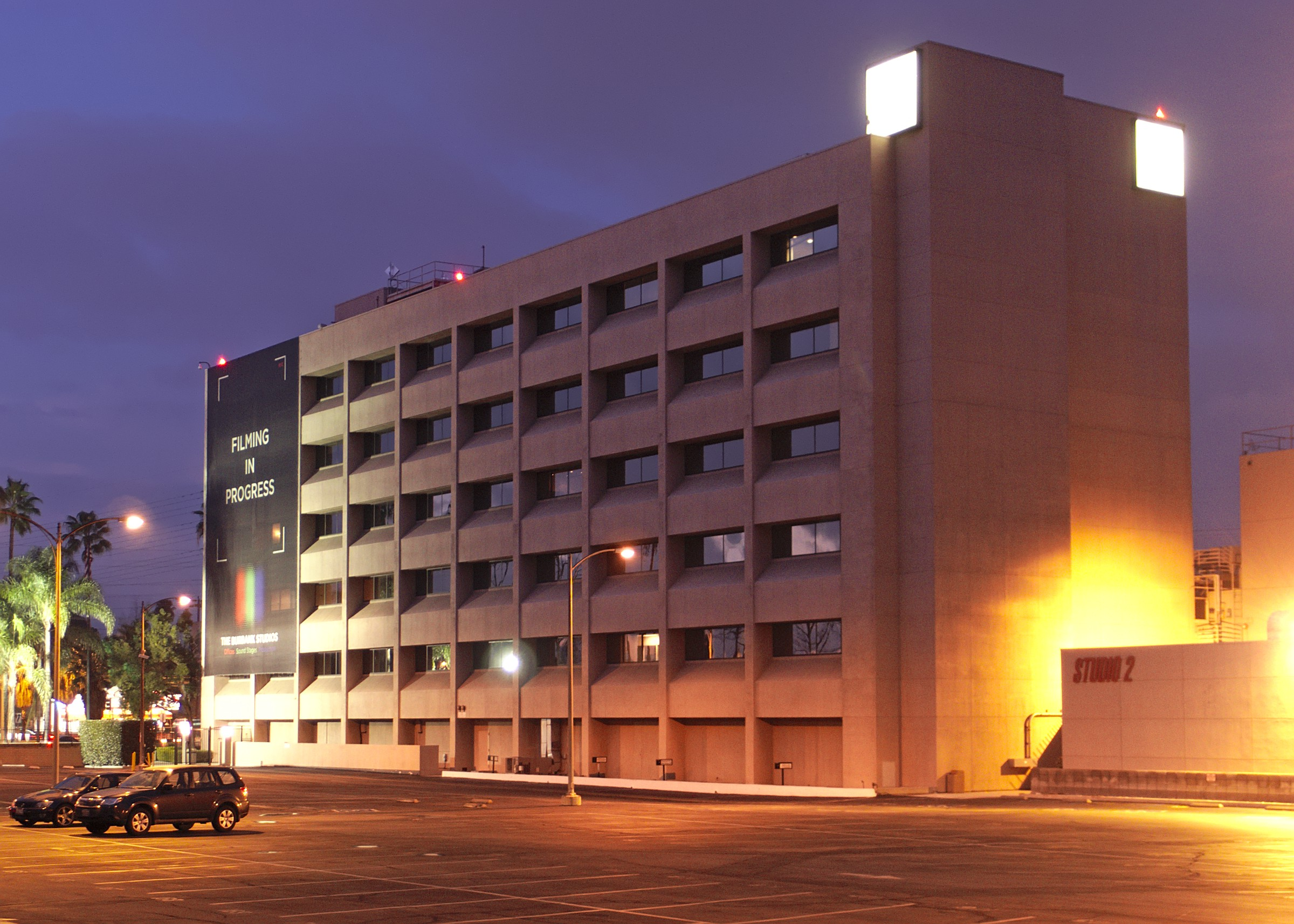
The Burbank Studios administrative building in 2015

RCA's decision to expand television studio facilities required moving to the real estate market in the San Fernando Valley-Burbank area, with land purchased from Jack Warner. The newly-renovated NBC Color City Studios opened in March 1955, as the first television studio designed specially for the origination of color television broadcasting, although their rivals, ABC and CBS would gradually add color broadcasting to their studio facilities in later years.

KNBC moved to a new building in 1962. In 1964, the Radio City Hollywood building was demolished, as NBC moved more of their West Coast television operations to the Burbank facility. The site is now occupied by a bank.

This studio hosted production of many of NBC's game and variety shows from the 1950s through the 1990s, including Hollywood Squares from 1966 to 1980, Wheel of Fortune from 1975 to 1989, Rowan and Martin's Laugh-in from 1968 to 1973, and The Tonight Show Starring Johnny Carson beginning in 1972. The latter two shows would frequently reference their home in "Beautiful Downtown Burbank" though Tonight would invariably begin each episode with the technically incorrect announcement, "From Hollywood..." During the late 1960s, Carson's Tonight Show would move for periods to Burbank, using studio 1. After the permanent move to Burbank in 1972, Bob Hope's shows taped in studio 1, with The Tonight Show taking a hiatus while Hope produced his specials. In 1971, President Richard Nixon announced Henry Kissinger's secret negotiations with Zhou Enlai and his impending visit to China from the studio.

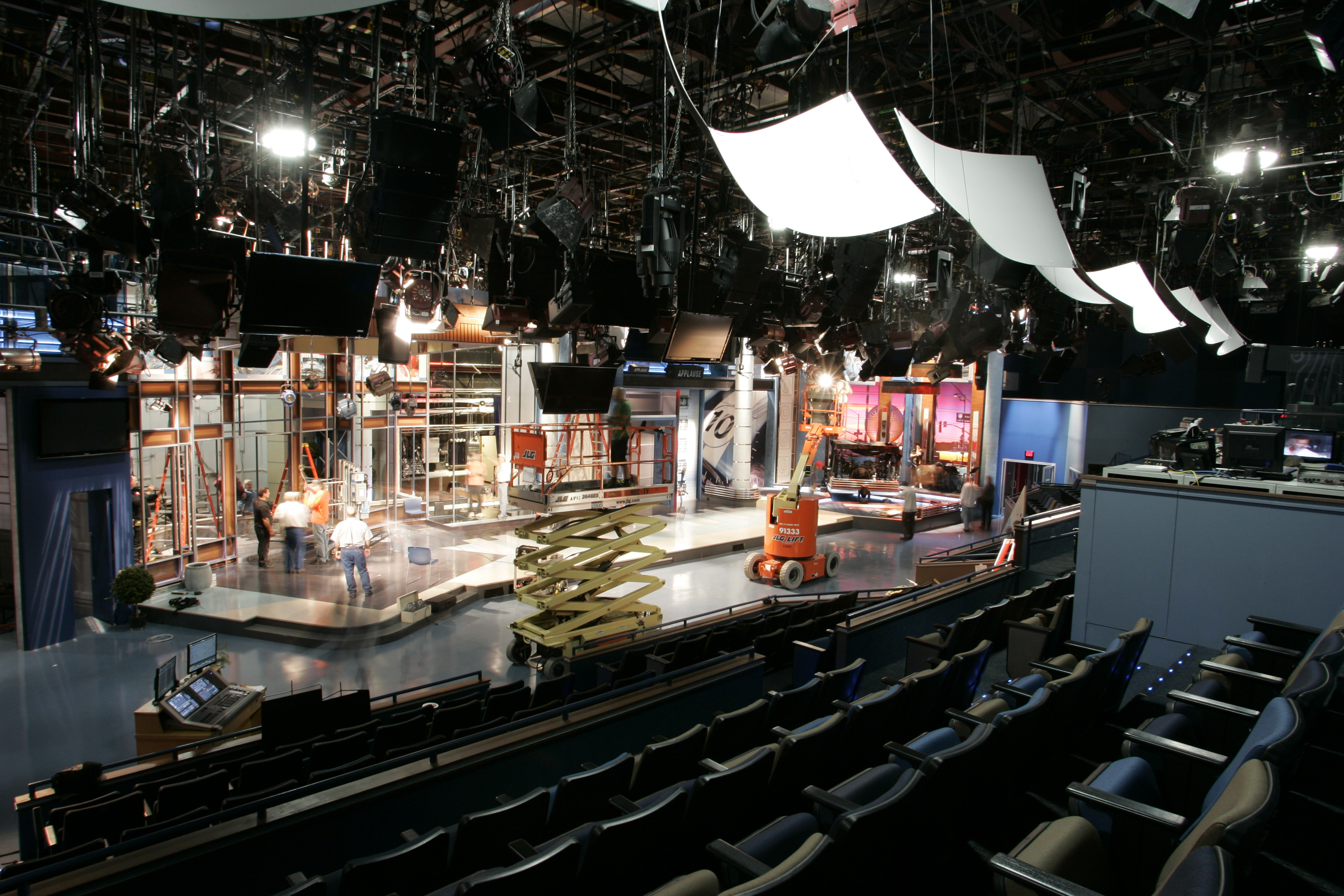
Studio 11, formerly the home of The Tonight Show with Jay Leno and The Jay Leno Show

The Tonight Show would stay in Burbank through Johnny Carson's retirement, during Jay Leno's tenure as host until the end of his first run in 2009, when it moved to an all-digital studio on the Universal lot in 2009 for the short-lived The Tonight Show with Conan O'Brien. The show moved back to the Burbank Studios when Leno returned as host of The Tonight Show on March 1, 2010. The show used studio 11 until Leno resigned as host on February 6, 2014. After that, The Tonight Show moved back to New York City's Rockefeller Center when Jimmy Fallon replaced Leno as host, marking the end of the 42-year era in which the show had recorded in Southern California.

=== NBC's move to Universal City ===
In October 2007, NBC announced plans to move most of its operations from Burbank to a new complex across the street from Universal Studios in Universal City. It would retain offices at the Burbank site until May 2013, though the studio complex was sold to Catalina/Worthe Real Estate Group in 2008, with NBCUniversal leasing space until 2013. The former Technicolor building on the Universal lot now serves as the home of NBC's West Coast operations. KNBC-TV and NBC News' Los Angeles bureau, along with Telemundo station KVEA, began broadcasting from Universal Studios on February 2, 2014.

The Burbank facility was one of the few television-specific studio facilities in Hollywood that offered tours to the general public until it ended on July 6, 2012.

On March 13, 2014, Lawrence O'Donnell announced that his MSNBC program would move to the NBC News Los Angeles bureau to Universal City and that it was the last nationally-televised program to be broadcast live from NBC's Burbank studio.

In 2014, the studio was renamed as The Burbank Studios, removing the NBC name entirely.

=== After NBC ===
On October 2, 2017, Studio 1 became the official home of Blizzard Arena Los Angeles and the Overwatch League, marking the Burbank Studios' first esports broadcast. The inaugural season began on January 10, 2018, in which over 437,000 viewers tuned in live on opening night via Twitch and MLG.tv streaming platforms. The final match was played on September 15, 2019, before the league moved to a traditional sports home-and-away format.

On April 15, 2019, WarnerMedia announced that it would purchase The Burbank Studios. The transaction was completed in late 2023.

On July 15, 2024, it was announced that Worthe Real Estate Group, QuadReal Property Group and Stockbridge Capital Group would reacquire The Burbank Studios as part of a years-long deal with Warner Bros. Discovery. The three companies paid $375 million for the 27-acre film studio campus in the Burbank Media District in Southern California, property records showed. Representatives announced the deal but did not disclose the value of the sale.

== Geography ==
The Burbank Studios is located on West Alameda Avenue, in Burbank, California. It lies across the street, on Bob Hope Drive, from Johnny Carson Park, the busiest park in Burbank.

== See also ==
- 30 Rockefeller Plaza
- NBC Tower
- NBC Radio City Studios
