= Paul Alter =

American television director (1922–2011)

- Born: March 11, 1922; Chicago, Illinois, U.S.
- Died: June 11, 2011 (aged 89); Los Angeles, California, U.S.
- Occupations: Television director, composer, producer

Paul Alter (March 11, 1922 – June 11, 2011) was an American television director, specializing in game shows for Mark Goodson Productions. Alter was best known as the original director of Family Feud from the show's origin in the mid-1970s until the early 1990s and the director of The Price Is Right from 1986 until 2000.

== Early life and career ==
Born in Chicago, Illinois, Alter studied piano with Teddy Wilson, from the Benny Goodman Quartet. Alter became a talented musician. Later on, Alter would put his talent to use composing the 1969 theme for To Tell the Truth.

== Television work ==
His first job as a game-show director was on the original CBS version of Beat the Clock in 1950. He then began a long association with Mark Goodson - Bill Todman Productions, where he worked on many of their shows including What's My Line?, I've Got a Secret and To Tell the Truth. Alter directed both versions of The Price Is Right, beginning with the original NBC version in New York starring Bill Cullen that ran from 1956 to 1965. In 1986 he became director of the CBS version, replacing Marc Breslow. Alter was relieved of his position as director of The Price Is Right in 2000 by Pearson Television due to an unfavorable deposition against host Bob Barker. Bart Eskander replaced Alter as director of The Price Is Right, though Alter briefly resumed his position as part of a special agreement with Pearson. Alter directed the original version of Family Feud which ran on ABC from 1976 to 1985. When Family Feud was revived in 1988, Alter directed that version as well until October 1990, when Alter left the show to direct To Tell the Truth.

He retired following his departure from The Price Is Right. On the E! True Hollywood Story episode on Family Feud, Alter gave some insight on popular game show hosts saying: "Dawson became more of the boss. That happens to any M.C. who becomes popular...he can call the shots."

In his career, Alter won two Emmy awards, first for Family Feud in 1982 and later for The Price is Right in 1996. He received 14 Emmy nominations during his career.

== Honey, I Blew Up the Kid lawsuit ==
In 1980, Alter submitted to the Walt Disney Company a story treatment about a kid who, due to a genetic accident, grew to an enormous size, which he based on his granddaughter's knocking over toys. By 1991, it became the movie Honey, I Blew Up the Kid. Alter sued Disney that year, claiming several similarities between that movie and his treatment. His case went to trial in 1993, which resulted in the jury awarding him $300,000.

== Death ==
Alter died of natural causes on June 11, 2011, in Los Angeles, California; he was 89.
