= List of programs broadcast by Buzzr =

The following is a list of programs currently or formerly broadcast on Buzzr. Some of these shows have aired on Game Show Network in the past.

== Current programming ==
=== Regularly airing ===
- Beat the Clock (Narz, Wood, and Hall)
- Body Language
- Card Sharks (Eubanks)
- Celebrity Name Game
- Classic Concentration
- Family Feud (Dawson)
- Family Feud Canada
- Family Feud Favorites
- Match Game (Rayburn)
  - Match Game-Hollywood Squares Hour
- Password Plus (Ludden, Kennedy, and Narz)
- Press Your Luck (Tomarken)
- The Price Is Right (Barker and Carey)
- Sale of the Century
- Super Password
- Supermarket Sweep (Ruprecht)
- Tattletales
- Temptation
- To Tell the Truth (Moore)
- Trivia Trap

=== Seasonal ===
- The Great Christmas Light Fight

=== Educational programming ===
- Dog Tales
- Science Nation

=== Religious programming ===
- Through the Bible with Les Feldick
- In Touch
- The Key of David
- Sunday Mass

== Former programming ==
- Beat the Clock (Collyer)
- The Better Sex
- Blockbusters (Cullen)
- Bzzz!
- Call My Bluff
- Card Sharks (Perry, Rafferty and Bullard)
- Chicken Soup for the Soul's Hidden Heroes
- Child's Play
- Choose Up Sides
- Concentration (Narz)
- Double Dare
- Family Feud (Combs, Anderson, Karn, and O'Hurley)
- Get the Message
- Going for Gold
- He Said, She Said
- It's News to Me (Daly)
- I've Got a Secret (Moore and Allen)
- Let’s Make a Deal (Hall and Brady)
- Make the Connection (Rayburn)
- Marty Stouffer's Wild America
- The Match Game (1964 "All-Star" episodes)
  - Match Game (Shafer and Baldwin)
  - Match Game PM
- Million Dollar Password
- Mindreaders
- Monster Garage
- Monster House
- The Name's the Same (Lewis)
- The Newlywed Game (Eubanks and Kroeger)
- Now You See It (Narz)
- Number Please
- Password (Ludden)
- Play Your Hunch
- The Price Is Right (Cullen)
- Richard Simmons' Dream Maker
- Say When!!
- Showoffs
- Small Talk
- Split Personality (1959 game show)
- Split Second (Hall)
- Strike It Rich
- Talk About
- To Tell the Truth (Collyer, Garagiola, Ward, Elliott, Swann, Trebek, O'Hurley, and Anderson)
- What's Going On?
- What's My Line? (Daly, Bruner and Blyden)
- Whew!
- Winner Take All (Cullen)
- Wordplay

=== Pilots ===
- Body Talk
- It Had to Be You
- Missing Links
- On a Roll
- Play for Keeps!
- Star Words
- TKO
- Take Your Choice

=== Specials ===
- TV's Funniest Game Show Moments
- TV's Funniest Game Show Moments #2
- The Price Is Right: A Tribute to Bob Barker
- What's My Line? at 25

=== Original ===
- Game Changers
