= Lee Vines =

Canadian-American television personality

- Born: April 11, 1919; Brantford, Ontario, Canada
- Died: July 9, 2011 (aged 92); North Hollywood, California, U.S.
- Occupations: Announcer, actor
- Years active: 1948–1990
- Spouse: Catherine

Lee Vines (April 11, 1919 – July 9, 2011) was a Canadian-born American radio and television announcer and actor. He was best known to television audiences in the 1950s as the announcer on the What's My Line? game show.

== Personal life ==
Lee Vines was born on April 11, 1919, in Brantford, Ontario, Canada, but emigrated to the United States. He was a veteran, having served in the U.S. Army from 1943 to 1945.

== Radio ==
Vines had been working in radio since the late 1930s, while attending high school in Camden, New Jersey. He became a staff announcer for station WIP in Philadelphia in 1939, replacing Louis Pierce who relocated to Texas, but resigned in September 1942 to accept a job with the CBS network. Vines's relief announcer Bill Manns replaced him. Vines also dabbled in songwriting, collaborating on a pop tune, "Slick as a Whistle". In September 1943, he enlisted in the Army and served in the European Theater.

After Vines's military service he returned to CBS, announcing for such shows as Bouquet for You, County Fair, Dr. Standish, Medical Examiner, The Janette Davis Show, Kings Row and Time for Love.

== Television ==
Lee Vines was closely associated with the ubiquitous TV personality Robert Q. Lewis during the 1950s. Vines was the announcer for Lewis's popular prime-time game show The Name's the Same and Lewis's daytime game show Make the Connection. He also announced Robert Q.'s Matinee and The Robert Q. Lewis Show, weekday-afternoon variety shows featuring light conversation and musical numbers. As part of the Lewis ensemble, "Lee Vines has been transformed from a straight announcer to a singer, dancer, comedian, and impersonator of Liberace."

During his tenure with Lewis, Vines took a flier in dramatic work, playing character roles on CBS Workshop and The Second Mrs. Burton.

Vines also was the announcer for other television shows including The Big Surprise, Celebrity Talent Scouts, Down You Go, Fractured Phrases, The Funny Side, Medic, Picture This Password and Hallmark Hall of Fame. His acting and voice-over roles included Hong Kong Phooey and The Mary Tyler Moore Show (as WJM announcer Lee).

== Death ==
Vines lived into his nineties but in failing health. He died from complications of pneumonia and a fall at a convalescent facility in North Hollywood, Los Angeles, on July 9, 2011, at the age of 92.
