= Call My Bluff (American game show) =

- Created by: Mark Goodson; Bill Todman
- Directed by: Mike Garguilo
- Presented by: Bill Leyden
- Announcer: Johnny Olson; Wayne Howell; Don Pardo
- Country of origin: United States
- No. of episodes: 125

Production
- Executive producers: Mark Goodson; Bill Todman; Robert Noah
- Producer: Jack Farren
- Production locations: NBC Studios; New York, New York
- Running time: 22 minutes
- Production company: Mark Goodson-Bill Todman Productions

Original release
- Network: NBC
- Release: March 29 – September 24, 1965

Call My Bluff is an American game show from Mark Goodson-Bill Todman Productions that aired on NBC daytime from March 29 to September 24, 1965. Bill Leyden was emcee, with Johnny Olson, Don Pardo and Wayne Howell as announcers.

Call My Bluff originated from Studio 6A at NBC Studios in Manhattan's Rockefeller Center.

== Game play ==
=== Main game ===
Two teams, each consisting of two contestants and one celebrity, competed. The object was for the teams to earn points by determining the correct definitions to obscure words.

Both teams were given a word. Each player on one team was provided a definition for that word, one of which was correct and the other two being "bluffs". The opposing team had to then determine which one was the correct definition. If the correct choice was made the team earned one point, if not, the bluffing team earned one point. Both teams alternated turns bluffing and determining definitions.

Whichever team scored two out of three points won the game and $100. Towards the end of the show's run, this was amended to three out of five points.

=== Bonus game ===
Both teams participated, with the winning team playing for a cash jackpot starting at $200 and the losing team playing to stay in the game. A guest with an unusual or interesting story was introduced, who then gave brief clues as to the identity of his/her story. The winning team was given three cards, one with the correct story and the other two with blank cards allowing those players to make up bluffs. The losing team then tried to determine the correct story by determining which winning player had the correct story.

If the correct choice was made, the losing team earned the right to play another game and $200 was added to the jackpot for the next bonus game. However, if one of the bluffs was chosen, the winning team won the cash jackpot and the losing team was defeated and replaced.

== Celebrities ==
Among the celebrities who appeared on Call My Bluff were Bill Cullen, Art James, Gene Rayburn, Betty White, Peggy Cass, Abe Burrows, and Lauren Bacall.

== Board game ==
Despite its short run, Milton Bradley issued a board game adaptation of Call My Bluff in 1965.

== Episode status ==
Recordings of Call My Bluff were believed to be destroyed due to network practices at the time. Two rehearsal shows are known to exist, one of which is held by the UCLA Film and Television Archive.

Buzzr featured Call My Bluff as a part of its 5th annual Lost and Found line-up on September 27, 2020.

== International versions ==
Country	Name	Host(s)	TV station	Premiere	Finale
Australia	Would You Believe?	Peter Lazar	Australian Broadcasting Company	1970	1974
Denmark	Fup eller Fakta	Otto Leisner; Erling Bundgaard; Zita Boye-Møller	Danmarks Radio	1966	1991
Denmark	Fup eller Fakta	Erling Bundgaard	Danmarks Radio	1966	1991
Denmark	Fup eller Fakta	Zita Boye-Møller	Danmarks Radio	1966	1991
Finland	Kuutamοlla	Santeri Kinnunen	MTV3	2001	2004
United Kingdom	Call My Bluff	Robin Ray	BBC2	October 17, 1965	April 16, 1994
United Kingdom	Call My Bluff	Joe Melia	BBC2	October 17, 1965	April 16, 1994
United Kingdom	Call My Bluff	Peter Wheeler	BBC2	October 17, 1965	April 16, 1994
United Kingdom	Call My Bluff	Robert Robinson	BBC2	October 17, 1965	April 16, 1994
United Kingdom	Call My Bluff	Bob Holness	BBC1	May 13, 1996	June 18, 2004
United Kingdom	Call My Bluff	Fiona Bruce	BBC1	May 13, 1996	June 18, 2004
