= List of programs broadcast by Retro TV =

The following is a list of programs airing on Retro TV.

== Current Programming ==
As of December 2025, based upon recent program guide.

- 21 Jump Street
- Animal Rescue (E/I)
- The Alien Files: UFO's Under Investigation
- The Beverly Hillbillies* (also airs on MeTV)
- Biz Kid$ (E/I)
- Daytime
- The Doctors
- Doctor Who
- Dog Tales (E/I)
- DragonflyTV (E/I)
- Heartland
- Hollywood Idols
- The Lucy Show*
- Mustard Pancakes (E/I)
- Off Beat Cinema
- The Ray Bradbury Theater
- Rowan and Martin's Laugh-In
- The Saint
- Think Big (E/I)
- Wiseguy

== Programming on the Web ==
- 21 Jump Street
- Animal Rescue (E/I)
- The Alien Files: UFO's Under Investigation
- The Beverly Hillbillies* (also airs on MeTV)
- Biz Kid$ (E/I)
- Daytime
- The Doctors
- Doctor Who
- Dog Tales (E/I)
- DragonflyTV (E/I)
- Heartland
- Hollywood Idols
- Life Outreach International
- The Lucy Show*
- Mustard Pancakes (E/I)
- The Ray Bradbury Theater
- Rowan and Martin's Laugh-In
- Sacred Name
- The Saint
- Shriners Hospital
- Think Big (E/I)
- Wiseguy

* Program is sourced from episodes in the public domain in the United States.

== Film presentations ==
- Dracula's Kung-Fu Theatre
- Drive In Movie Maniacs
- Horror Hotel (hosted sci-fi and horror)
- Off Beat Cinema
- Retro Drive-In
- Six-Gun Theater
- Who Dun It Theater

== Former programming ==
- 7th Street Theater
- Acorn TV
- Adam-12 (now on MeTV)
- The Adventures of Black Beauty
- The Adventures of Dudley the Dragon
- The Adventures of Ellery Queen
- The Adventures of Champion*
- The Adventures of Kit Carson*
- The Adventures of Ozzie and Harriet*
- The Adventures of Robin Hood
- Alias Smith and Jones
- Alfred Hitchcock Presents (now airs on MeTV)
- Airwolf
- Annie Oakley*
- Archie's Funhouse
- The Archie Show
- The A-Team (now on Heroes & Icons)
- Baa Baa Black Sheep
- Bachelor Father
- The Barbara Stanwyck Show
- The Barkleys*
- Battlestar Galactica
- The Bold Ones
- Bonanza*
- The Border
- The Brady Bunch (now on MeTV and Catchy Comedy)
- BraveStarr
- Buck Rogers*
- Buck Rogers in the 25th Century
- The Campbells
- Captain Isotope and the Enemy of Space*
- The Cisco Kid
- Cliffhangers
- Coffee with America
- Cold Squad
- The Colgate Comedy Hour
- The Collector
- The Comedy Shop
- Coop Dreams
- Crusade in Europe
- Danger Man: Secret Agent
- Dangerous Assignment*
- DaVinci's Inquest
- Decoy*
- Delvecchio
- The Dick Tracy Show
- Dione Lucas
- Disasters of the Century
- The Droogles
- Dragnet (1950s version)
- Dusty's Trail*
- Emergency! (now on MeTV)
- Escape from Jupiter / Return to Jupiter
- Fat Albert and the Cosby Kids
- Fishtronaut
- Flash Gordon*
- Follow That Man
- Four Star Playhouse*
- Fury
- The Genie from Down Under
- Get Smart (now on Catchy Comedy)
- Ghostbusters
- The Girl from Tomorrow
- The Green Archer*
- The Green Hornet*
- Groovie Goolies
- Gumby
- Gunsmoke (now on TV Land, INSP and MeTV)
- Happy Days (now on Catchy Comedy)
- The Hardy Boys/Nancy Drew Mysteries
- Harry and the Hendersons
- Harveytoons
- Have Gun – Will Travel (now on MeTV)
- Haven
- Hawkeye and the Last of the Mohicans
- Heart of Health
- He-Man and the Masters of the Universe
- Hip Hop Harry
- Highway to Heaven (now on CoziTV)
- Hiring America
- Hot Wheels*
- The Houndcats*
- I Married Joan*
- I Spy
- The Incredible Hulk
- The Indian Doctor
- Inspiration Ministries
- Intelligence
- Ironside
- It Takes a Thief
- The Jack Benny Program (now on Antenna TV)
- The Jerry Lewis Show
- The Joey Bishop Show (now on Antenna TV)
- Judge Roy Bean*
- Kate & Allie
- The Key of David
- Knight Rider
- Kojak
- Kraft Suspense Theatre
- Laredo (now on Get)
- Lassie
- The Lawless Years*
- Leave It to Beaver (now airs on MeTV)
- Legacy of the Silver Shadow
- Life with Elizabeth*
- Lock-Up*
- The Lone Ranger* (also airs on FETV and The Cowboy Channel)
- The Loretta Young Show
- Man with a Camera*
- Magnum, P.I. (now airs on Hallmark Movies & Mysteries and GET)
- Marcus Welby, M.D. (now on Get)
- McHale's Navy (now on Antenna TV)
- Medic*
- Meet Corliss Archer*
- Merv Griffin's Crosswords
- The Millionaire
- Mister Peepers
- The Mickey Rooney Show*
- Mickey Spillane's Mike Hammer
- The Misadventures of Sheriff Lobo
- The Mooh Brothers
- Mork & Mindy (now on Antenna TV and Rewind TV)
- Mr. and Mrs. North
- Mr. Magoo
- Movin' On
- The Munsters Today
- Murdoch Mysteries (now on ION Plus)
- My Bedbugs
- My Little Margie*
- Mystery Science Theater 3000 (now on IFC and Z Living)
- Naked City
- The Neighborhood
- The New Adventures of Pinocchio
- The New Zorro
- Night Gallery
- O'Hara, U.S. Treasury
- One Step Beyond*
- Perry Mason (now on MeTV)
- Peter Gunn (now airs on MeTV)
- Petticoat Junction*
- Police Surgeon
- The Public Defender
- Susie*
- Quincy, M.E. (now on GET)
- Racket Squad*
- Rawhide (now on MeTV)
- The Real McCoys
- The Red Skelton Show*
- Republic of Doyle
- The Rockford Files (now on Get)
- Rocket Robin Hood
- Route 66
- The Roy Rogers Show* (also airs on The Cowboy Channel)
- Run for Your Life
- Sabrina the Teenage Witch
- Sacred Name
- Sarge
- The Secret of Isis
- Shotgun Slade*
- Simon & Simon
- Sky Trackers
- Soupy Sales
- Spellbinder / Spellbinder: Land of the Dragon Lord
- Superman*
- Suspense*
- Tales of the Wizard of Oz
- Tales of Tomorrow*
- Tarzán
- That's Incredible!
- The Trouble with Father*
- The U.S. of Archie
- Victory at Sea*
- The Virginian
- Voyagers!
- Wagon Train (now on MeTV)
- Wild America
- The Wild Wild West (now airs on MeTV)
