= Mark Goodson =

American TV producer (1915–1992)

- Goodson in 1948
- Born: Mark Leo Goodson; January 14, 1915; Sacramento, California, U.S.
- Died: December 18, 1992 (aged 77); New York City, U.S.
- Education: University of California, Berkeley (B.S., Economics, 1937)
- Occupation: Television producer
- Years active: 1937–1992
- Known for: Early television game shows and Goodson-Todman Productions
- Spouses: Bluma Neveleff (m. 1941, divorced); Virginia McDavid (m. 1956, divorced); Suzanne Waddell (m. 1972; div. 1978)
- Children: 3, including Jonathan Goodson

Mark Leo Goodson (January 14, 1915 – December 18, 1992) was an American television producer who specialized in game shows, most frequently with his business partner Bill Todman, with whom he created Goodson-Todman Productions.

== Early life and early career ==
Goodson was born in Sacramento, California, on January 14, 1915. His Jewish parents, Abraham Ellis (1875–1954) and Fannie Goodson (1887–1986), emigrated from Russia in the early 1900s. As a child, Goodson acted in amateur theater with the Plaza Stock Company. The family later moved to Hayward, California. Goodson recalled that his childhood was impoverished, and that he developed an intense work ethic out of fear of returning to poverty. Originally intending to become a lawyer, Goodson attended the University of California, Berkeley. He financed his education through scholarships and by working at the Lincoln Fish Market. He graduated Phi Beta Kappa in 1937 with a degree in economics.

That year, he began his broadcasting career in San Francisco, working as a disc jockey at radio station KJBS (now KFAX). In 1939, he joined radio station KFRC, where he produced and hosted a radio quiz called Pop the Question in which contestants selected questions by throwing darts at multicolored balloons.

In 1941, while working on the local quiz show, The Battle of the Boroughs, he met Bill Todman, a radio writer, director, and advertising copywriter. This was soldiifed into the Goodson-Todman partnership to start the radio hit Winner Take All.

== Television production ==
Goodson and long-time partner Bill Todman produced some of the longest-running game shows in American television history, and their names were well known at least to the large audiences for these shows. Their first television show, Winner Take All, debuted on CBS television on July 1, 1948. The long list of Goodson-Todman productions includes The Price Is Right, Family Feud, Classic Concentration, Match Game, Password, Beat the Clock, To Tell the Truth (Goodson's personal favorite show), I've Got a Secret, What's My Line?, Card Sharks, and Tattletales. Goodson-Todman Productions/Mark Goodson Productions created content for American channels and other international channels. (including Talbot Television Ltd. and Fremantle UK Productions Ltd.). such as CBS, NBC, and ABC in the US, BBC1, ITV (Anglia, Central, Granada, LWT, TVS, Scottish Television, and Yorkshire Television), Channel 4, and Sky One, (also Challenge TV). It licensed many of its shows to the Reg Grundy Organisation to be adapted in Australia and Europe.

Goodson and Todman's shows endured through the decades, many over multiple runs, because of Goodson's sharp eye for production and presentation, and their strict insistence on maintaining clean, honest contests, thus allowing their shows to survive the quiz-show scandals of the late 1950s. After those scandals wiped out most of their competition, much of the newer game-show output of the 1960s and 1970s came from either Goodson-Todman or companies launched by their former employees: Merv Griffin, Bob Stewart, Monty Hall, and later Jay Wolpert. Goodson-Todman was involved with Jack Barry's comeback vehicle The Joker's Wild for its 1969 pilot, but ended involvement with the show before it debuted in 1972 (coincidentally, on the same lineup as Goodson and Todman's own daytime game show comeback vehicle, The Price Is Right).

While Todman oversaw the company's lucrative businesses outside of television, Goodson handled the creative aspects of producing game shows. The people who worked for the company and created most of the Goodson-Todman shows were pivotal to the success of those shows. Goodson-Todman executives Bob Stewart, Bob Bach, Gil Fates, Ira Skutch, Frank Wayne, Chester Feldman, Paul Alter, Howard Felsher, Ted Cooper, Mimi O'Brien, Jay Wolpert, and others were instrumental in making the shows successful.

Goodson-Todman twice sold two game shows to CBS, one in 1958 for What's My Line?, and one in 1960 with Garry Moore (as Telecast Enterprises) for I've Got a Secret, although both shows continue to employ Goodson-Todman's talent and production staff. Both shows eventually got bought back by Goodson-Todman around the 1970s, although I've Got a Secret was sold to The Carsey-Werner Company in 1992.

The company proved itself to be masterful at games, but was not as successful when it tried other fields of television programs, including the anthology dramas The Web and The Richard Boone Show, a talk-variety show for famed insult comic Don Rickles – and what was possibly the company's biggest failure, a sitcom titled One Happy Family. Goodson-Todman Productions was also involved with three Westerns: Jefferson Drum (1958–59), starring Jeff Richards as a newspaper editor in the Old West; The Rebel (1959–1961), starring Nick Adams as a former Confederate soldier who traveled to the West after the American Civil War (Johnny Cash sang the theme); and Branded, starring Chuck Connors as a soldier who had wrongly been given a dishonorable discharge from the Army.

Goodson received substantial criticism from within the television industry, particularly from the 1970s onward, for tolerating a broad, lowbrow style of entertainment for his game shows, such that David Susskind once attempted to talk him out of the business and into more reputable fare. He responded to Susskind: "What do you do that is so distinctive and so much better than what I do?" He also remarked to TV Guide in 1978 that he often spent years of development on each new series and that "we give game shows the same dedication—perhaps foolishly—that Hal Prince gives to the opening of a Broadway show." Regarding the lack of respect for his work, he stated: "I regret it and I resent it."

For many years, the company was headquartered in the Seagram Building at 375 Park Avenue in New York City. Most of the company's production moved to Hollywood in the early 1970s (as did many other production companies), starting with the ABC revival of Password in 1971. The Los Angeles offices were based at 6430 Sunset Boulevard, moving to 5750 Wilshire Boulevard. The company's last New York-based show was the 1980 version of To Tell the Truth, but the New York office remained open and was used for East Coast Child's Play auditions.

A few years after Bill Todman's death in 1979, Goodson acquired the Todman heirs' share of the company, and in 1982, the company was renamed Mark Goodson Productions. Goodson had already been the dominant partner in the business by the early 1970s after Todman's retirement. Traditionally, shows signed off with: "This is (announcer's name) speaking for (show name), A Mark Goodson-Bill Todman Production/A Mark Goodson Television Production." After Goodson's death, to pay off a massive inheritance tax, Goodson's family sold the rights (except for Concentration/Classic Concentration, which had been licensed from NBC) to All-American Television, which was subsequently taken over by Pearson PLC (an educational publisher and communications company based in the United Kingdom), and, in turn, was acquired by RTL Group (a division of Bertelsmann), to form Fremantle, which now owns the rights to the library from Mark Goodson Productions. The Mark Goodson Productions name, logo, and announcement continued to be used for some shows until 2007, when Bob Barker's last show of The Price Is Right aired. Afterward, at the close of each episode of The Price Is Right, the announcer credits the show as "a FremantleMedia Production" until 2018; it is now credited simply as "a Fremantle Production", reflecting the name change of the company. However, for decades week kicking off season 44 in 2015 the Mark Goodson-Bill Todman Productions announcement was brought back for the throwback 1970s episode and Mark Goodson Productions announcement was brought back for the 1980s and 1990s episodes albeit the Fremantlemedia logo in place.

Copyrights to many of the Goodson-Todman's game shows were assigned to its specially formed companies, named in The (program name) Company scheme, such as The Family Company, The Password Company etc. They are currently in-name-only units of Fremantle North America.

In 1990, Goodson received the Emmy Award "Lifetime Achievement Award for Daytime Television", which was presented to him by Betty White. Two years later, in 1992, Goodson earned induction into the Television Hall of Fame.

=== Foreign versions ===
Many Goodson-Todman games were produced internationally, some under different titles, and were distributed by Reg Grundy Productions. Family Feud was known in the United Kingdom as Family Fortunes, and Card Sharks went under the title Play Your Cards Right. In Germany, Match Game was known as Schnickschnack (loosely translated, "something, anything" and used as a counterpart for the word "blank", for which German has no direct word). In the United Kingdom, it was known as Blankety Blank, while in Australia, it was known as Blankety Blanks (which, coincidentally, was the title of an unrelated American game show, created by former Goodson-Todman staffer Bob Stewart).

== Shows ==
Of the numerous shows Goodson produced in his lifetime, four are currently on the air: The Price Is Right, which has run continuously since 1972; Family Feud, which ran in two different iterations during 1976–1985 and 1988–1995, and was revived in its current form in 1999; Password, which was revived in 2022 after a lengthy stint off the air; and Match Game, which returned in 2025. All revivals since 1994 have been produced by successor companies including All-American Television from 1994 to 1998, Pearson Television from 1998 to 2002, FremantleMedia from 2002 to 2018, and Fremantle since 2018.

=== Mark Goodson–Bill Todman Productions (1948–1982) ===
- All-Star Family Feud Special (ABC 1978–1984)
- About Last Night (HBO Max 2022; a remake of Tattletales) produced by Sweet July Productions and Unanimous Media
- Beat the Clock (CBS, ABC 1950–1961, 1969–1974, CBS 1979–1980 copyrighted as The Clock Co., 2002–2003 copyrighted as Tick Tock Productions, Ltd., 2018–2019)
- The Better Sex (ABC 1977–1978) copyrighted as Strong Productions
- Blade Rider, Revenge of the Indian Nations (1966)
- Blockbusters (NBC 1980–1982, 1987) 1980-1982 copyrighted as The Blockbusters Company, 1987 copyrighted as The B.B. Co.; UK version produced from 1983 to 1995
- Branded (NBC 1965–1967)
- Broken Sabre (1965)
- By Popular Demand (CBS 1950)
- Call My Bluff (NBC 1965)
- Card Sharks (NBC 1978–1981, CBS/Syn 1986–1989, Syn 2001–2002, ABC 2019–2021) copyrighted as Suzanne Productions (later MG Productions), and The Card Sharks Company.
- Celebrity Family Feud (2008, 2015–present)
- Choose Up Sides (NBC 1956)
- Concentration and Classic Concentration (Syn 1973–1978, NBC 1987–1991) copyrighted as G-T Enterprises and The Concentration Company
- The Don Rickles Show (ABC 1968–1969)
- Double Dare (CBS 1976–1977) copyrighted by Suzanne Productions
- (The New) Family Feud (Challenge) (ABC 1976–1985, CBS 1988–1995, Syn 1999–present) copyrighted by The Family Company, The New Family Company, Feudin' Productions, and Wanderlust Productions
- Get the Message (ABC 1964)
- Goodyear Theatre (NBC 1957–1960)
- He Said, She Said (Syn 1969–1970)
- It's News to Me (CBS 1951–1953, 1954)
- I've Got a Secret (CBS 1952–1967, Syn 1972–1973, 1976, 2000–2001, GSN 2006) produced/copyrighted as Telecast Enterprises from 1960 to 1967; produced by Oxygen Media LLC in the 2000–01 version and Burt DuBrow Productions in association with Get Real Entertainment in the 2006 version
- Jefferson Drum (1958–1959)
- Judge for Yourself (NBC 1953–1954)
- Las Vegas Beat (1961)
- Make the Connection (1955)
- Match Game (NBC 1962–1969, CBS 1973–1982, ABC 1990–1991, Syn 1998–1999, ABC 2016–2021, 2025-present) copyrighted as Sojourn Productions, Celebrity Productions, The Match Game Company, and others.
- Million Dollar Password (2008–09)
- Mindreaders (NBC 1979–80, unrelated to the 1975 pilot) copyrighted as The Mindreaders Company
- Missing Links (NBC, ABC 1963–1964)
- The Name's the Same (ABC 1951–1954, 1954–1955)
- Now You See It (CBS 1974–1975, 1989) copyrighted as Suzanne Productions and The Now You See It Company
- Number Please (ABC 1961)
- One Happy Family (1961)
- Password (CBS 1961–1967, ABC 1971–1975, NBC 2022–present) copyrighted as Peak Productions.
- Password Plus and Super Password (NBC 1979–1982, NBC 1984–1989) copyrighted as The Password Company and The Super Password Company.
- Philip Marlowe (1959–60)
- Play Your Hunch (CBS, ABC, NBC 1958–1963)
- The Price Is Right (NBC, ABC 1956–1965, Syn 1972–1980, 1985–86, 1994–95, CBS 1972–present) copyrighted as Marbil Productions, Price Productions and The Price Is Right Productions.
- The Rebel (1959–1961)
- The Richard Boone Show (1963–1964)
- Ride Beyond Vengeance (1966)
- Say When!! (NBC 1961–1965)
- Showoffs (ABC 1975)
- Snap Judgment (NBC 1967–1969)
- Split Personality (NBC 1959–60)
- Stop the Music (ABC 1948–1952, ABC 1954–1956) produced in association with Louis Cowan Productions
- Tattletales (CBS, Syn 1974–1978, CBS 1982–1984) copyrighted as Panel Productions and The Tattletales Company.
- That's My Line (CBS 1980–1981) copyrighted as T.M.L. Productions
- To Tell the Truth (CBS 1956–1968, Syn 1969–1978, Syn 1980–81, NBC 1990–91, Syn 2000–2002, ABC 2016–2022) copyrighted as The Truth Company (1980-1981) and The TTTT Co. (1990-1991)
- Two for the Money (CBS 1952–1956, NBC 1957)
- What's Going On? (ABC 1954)
- What's My Line? (CBS 1950–1967, Syn 1968–1975)
- What's My Line? at 25 (ABC 1975)
- The Web (CBS 1950–1954)
- The Web (NBC 1957)
- Winner Take All (CBS, NBC 1948–1950, 1951, 1952)

=== Mark Goodson Productions (1982–1996) ===
- Body Language (CBS 1984–86) copyrighted as The Body Language Company
- Bonus Bonanza (1995)
- Child's Play (CBS 1982–83) copyrighted as The Child's Play Company
- Classic Concentration (NBC 1987–91) copyrighted as The Concentration Company, a subsidiary of NBC.
- Come Back to the 5 and Dime, Jimmy Dean, Jimmy Dean (1982)
- Flamingo Fortune (1995)
- TV's Funniest Game Show Moments (1984)
- TV's Funniest Game Show Moments #2 (1985)
- Illinois Instant Riches (1994–96)
- The Match Game-Hollywood Squares Hour (NBC 1983–1984) copyrighted as The MG-HS Company
- Trivia Trap (ABC 1984–1985) copyrighted as The Trivia Trap Company

=== Other shows based on Mark Goodson formats ===
- 100 Latinos Dijeron (MundoFox/MundoMax 2013–2015, Estrella TV 2019–present - 2nd Spanish version of Family Feud)
- ¿Qué Dice la Gente? (Telefutura 2006–2008 - 1st Spanish version of Family Feud)
- Dame la Pista (Telefutura 2008 – Spanish version of Child's Play)
- ¿Qué Dicen los Famosos? (Telemundo 2022–2023 - Spanish version of Celebrity Family Feud {2015 version})
- You Lie Like a Dog (Animal Planet 2000 – Animal themed version of To Tell the Truth)
- Philly Pheud (WPHL-TV 2013–present - local Philadelphia version of Family Feud)

=== Claim to Fame ===
From 1981 until 1982, the CTV Television Network in Canada aired the short-lived Carleton Productions (in association with Goodson-Todman) creation Claim to Fame hosted by Mike McManus, the show invited a celebrity panel to interview guests and discover what had made them famous in their field. The panelists varied from Lois Maxwell, Valerie Pringle, Don Dickerson, Brian Linehan, Deborah Burgess and Harvey Atkin. The series started the 1982–83 season on Tuesdays at 9:30pm but had gone from the schedule very early in 1983. Gil Fates supervised the production in the studio of CTV affiliate station CJOH-TV Ottawa. Some say the show played very similar to the unsold Bob Stewart pilot creation called Strictly Confidential hosted by Dick Clark in 1980. Its theme song (produced by Score Productions) was borrowed from Mindreaders hosted by Dick Martin airing on NBC from August 13, 1979 until January 11, 1980 which would latter be carried over and used as a re-arranged commercial cue for Celebrity Charades hosted by Jay Johnson and Squeaky in syndication from January to September 1979 would later carry over to the unsold pilot Puzzlers hosted by future and former host of Wheel of Fortune, Pat Sajak produced on March 14, 1980.

== Personal life and death ==
In 1941, Goodson married Bluma Neveleff and moved to New York City, where he teamed up with partner Bill Todman. Todman died from a heart condition on July 29, 1979, two days before his 63rd birthday. In 1982, the Goodsons acquired the Todman heirs' portion of the company.

Goodson and Neveleff had two children, Jill (1942) and Jonathan (1945). They divorced and he married Virginia McDavid, a former Miss Alabama. In 1962, Goodson and McDavid had a daughter, Marjorie, who was a prize model on Classic Concentration from July 1987 until its finale in September 1991. In 1972, he married Suzanne Waddell, who had once been a guest on What's My Line? They divorced in 1978.

Goodson died of pancreatic cancer on December 18, 1992, in New York City at the age of 77. He is interred at Hillside Memorial Park in Culver City, California, along with his parents Fannie Goodson and A.E. Goodson. After his death, Bob Barker gave him a small tribute that aired after an episode of The Price Is Right, as an attached segment that followed the end credits:

This is a very sad time for The Price Is Right family. We've lost Mr. Mark Goodson, the creator of our show. Mr. Goodson, a legendary figure in television, was respected throughout the industry and we shall miss his guidance in the years to come.

— Bob Barker

Following was a portrait of Goodson and a message saying, "Mark Goodson 1915–1992".

== Legacy ==
Reruns of Goodson's shows have continued to dominate both the schedules of Game Show Network/GSN and Buzzr because his company saved most of the episodes of the shows, while other companies wiped theirs to reuse the tapes. The practice of wiping was stopped by the start of the 1980s.

=== Biography ===
On June 3, 2000, an episode of Biography called Mark Goodson: Will the Real Mark Goodson Please Stand Up? aired on A&E hosted by Harry Smith and narrated by Russell Buchanan, where it profiled his life and career. This features many interviews of the hosts, panelists, and co-workers such as Betty White, Bob Barker, Gene Rayburn, Kitty Carlisle, Marjorie Goodson, and Suzanne Goodson.

=== 2009 Game Show Awards ===
On June 6, 2009, an awards special that aired on GSN called 2009 Game Show Awards presented by Howie Mandel, featured a brief tribute to Goodson presented by Alex Trebek as his daughter Marjorie held the Innovator Award herself.

=== Game Show Marathon ===
The series was based on the British format called Ant & Dec's/Vernon Kay's Gameshow Marathon and ran on CBS from May 31 until June 29, 2006, hosted by former actress/talk show host Ricki Lake, announced by Rich Fields (who formerly announced for The Price is Right from 2004 until 2010, who is now succeeded by George Gray), and Todd Newton (who himself host a live stage version of Price called The Price is Right Live! and did a host audition of the show itself in 2007) as the prize deliverer in which six celebrities (Lance Bass, Paige Davis, Tim Meadows, Kathy Najimy, Leslie Nielsen, and Brande Roderick) played seven classic game shows for their favorite charities and the home viewer featured five formats based on Goodson-Todman/Goodson shows along with the recreation of their original sets such as The Price is Right (1972 version), Beat the Clock, Card Sharks, Match Game and Family Feud.

=== Buzzr (YouTube) ===
From 2014 until 2016, the Buzzr brand was first used by its parent company FremantleMedia (now Fremantle) for its YouTube channel created by its digital-content studio Tiny Riot. The online channel features mostly classic clips along with its short-form reboots of its classic game show properties using various internet celebrities as contestants. Four of the Goodson-Todman/Goodson shows that were rebooted were Family Feud, Password, Beat the Clock, and Body Language.

=== The Mega-Brands That Built America ===
On August 9, 2026, an episode of The Mega-Brands That Built Americacalled "The Game Makers" (Season 4, 'Episode 2) aired on The History Channel explores the intense rivalry and multi-decade competition between TV legends Mark Goodson and Merv Griffin as they reinvented the television game show into a cultural and financial empire.
