= Gene Rayburn =

American radio and television personality (1917–1999)

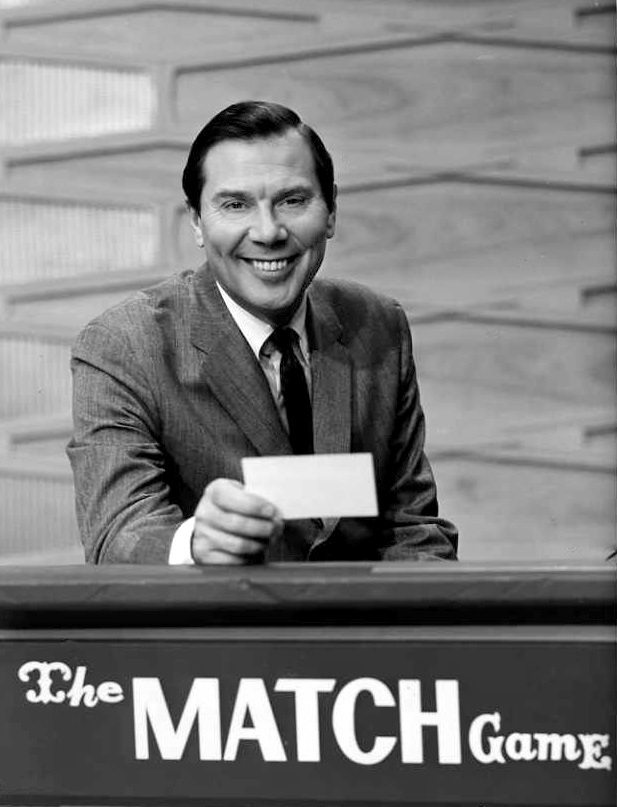
- Rayburn hosting the Match Game in 1964
- Born: Eugene Peter Jeljenic; December 22, 1917; Christopher, Illinois, US
- Died: November 29, 1999 (aged 81); Gloucester, Massachusetts, US
- Occupations: Game show host, announcer, actor
- Years active: 1937–1999
- Known for: Match Game
- Spouse: Helen Ticknor (m. 1940; died 1996)
- Children: 1
- Awards: Lifetime Achievement Award from the Academy of Television Arts & Sciences
- Military career
- Allegiance: United States
- Branch: United States Army Air Forces
- Service years: 1942–1945
- Rank: Second Lieutenant
- Conflicts: World War II

Gene Rayburn (born Eugene Peter Jeljenic; December 22, 1917 – November 29, 1999) was an American radio and television personality. He is best known as the host of various editions of the American television game show Match Game for over two decades.

== Early life ==
Rayburn was born in Christopher, Illinois, the younger of two children of Croatian immigrants Marija "Mary" Hikec and Petar "Pero" Jeljenić. In an episode of Match Game ‘74, Rayburn spoke Croatian with a contestant and mentioned that his parents were born in what was then Yugoslavia. His father died when Rayburn was an infant. Mary moved her family to Chicago; it was there she met Milan Rubessa. She married Rubessa on November 10, 1919, and gave her son the name Eugene Rubessa (/ruːˈbeɪʃə/). He had an elder brother, Alfred, who was killed when Rayburn was a child and a younger half-brother, Milan Rubessa Jr.

Rayburn graduated from Lindblom Technical High School and attended Knox College. He was senior class president at Lindblom and acted in the plays Robert of Sicily and Mrs. Wiggs of the Cabbage Patch.

An aspiring actor and opera singer, Rayburn moved to New York City but was unable to find stage work. He found a job as a page and tour guide at NBC studios at 30 Rockefeller Plaza instead. After three years in that position, Rayburn began announcing at various radio stations, eventually landing back in New York at WNEW. He enlisted in the United States Army Air Forces and served in World War II. Gene chose the stage name "Rayburn" by randomly sticking his finger in the phone book.

== Career ==
=== Radio career ===
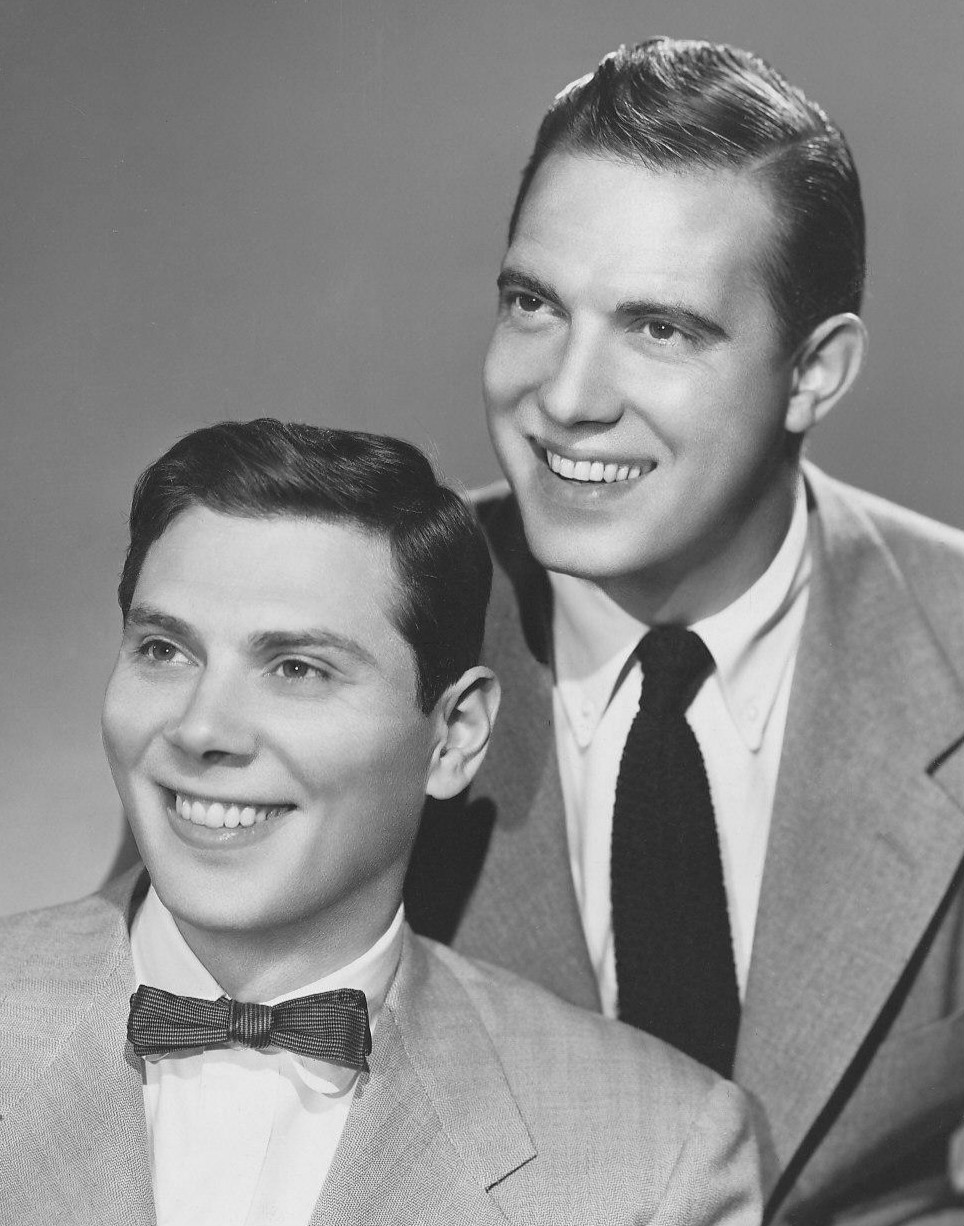
Rayburn and Finch, 1951

Before appearing in television, Rayburn was an actor and radio performer. He had a morning drive time radio show in New York City, first with Jack Lescoulie (Anything Goes) and later with Dee Finch (Rayburn & Finch) on WNEW. Rayburn's pairings with Lescoulie and Finch helped to popularize the now-familiar morning drive radio format. At WNEW, he lobbied for playing of certain songs, resulting in chart popularity (e.g. "Music! Music! Music!" (recorded by Teresa Brewer)) and co-authored the lyrics of the song "Hop-Scotch Polka" with Carl Sigman (both 1949). When Rayburn left WNEW, Dee Finch continued the format with Gene Klavan.

From 1961 through 1973, Rayburn served as the longest-tenured "communicator" (host) of NBC Radio's "Monitor (radio program)" weekend broadcast. He relinquished the position after resuming his "Match Game" hosting duties on CBS' version of the show in 1973. The new show was taped at CBS Television City in Los Angeles on alternate weekends, proving to be an insurmountable conflict with "Monitor", which originated at NBC's headquarters at 30 Rockefeller Plaza in New York.

=== Stage career ===
Rayburn took the lead role in the Broadway musical Bye Bye Birdie when Dick Van Dyke left the production to star in The Dick Van Dyke Show. At one point in his stage career, Rayburn's stand-in was future Match Game panelist Charles Nelson Reilly.

=== Television career ===
Breaking into television as the original announcer on Steve Allen's Tonight, Rayburn began a long association with game show producers Mark Goodson and Bill Todman in 1953. He first appeared on Robert Q. Lewis's The Name's the Same; Rayburn frequently sat in for regular panelist Carl Reiner. In 1955, he took over as host of the summer replacement game show Make the Connection from original host Jim McKay (and appearing with his WNEW morning show successor Gene Klavan). From there he hosted shows such as Choose Up Sides, Dough Re Mi, Play Your Hunch, and the daytime version of Tic Tac Dough. On radio, Rayburn became one of the many hosts of the NBC program Monitor in 1961 and remained with the show until 1973.

In an uncredited role (he reportedly did not want his name to appear), Rayburn played a TV interviewer in the movie It Happened to Jane (1959) starring Doris Day. Rayburn was also a frequent panelist in the 1960s and 1970s on What's My Line? and To Tell the Truth.

=== Match Game ===
Rayburn on the set of Match Game 76

From 1962 to 1969, Rayburn hosted The Match Game. In the original version, which aired from New York on NBC, Rayburn read questions to two panels, each consisting of a celebrity and two audience members. The questions in the original game were ordinary, like "Name a kind of muffin," or "John loves his ____________." Rayburn usually played it straight, though he would make jokes as the situation warranted. Very few episodes have been preserved; only four are known to exist. The show was canceled in 1969 to make room for the topical, short-lived game show Letters to Laugh-In.

Goodson-Todman revived Match Game in 1973 for CBS, this time as a California-based game show. Rayburn returned as host and introduced a new format in which two contestants tried to match the responses of six celebrities. Writer Dick DeBartolo, a veteran of the original show, created funnier and often risqué questions ("The big bad wolf said: I just came from a house where this old lady had the biggest ____________s I ever saw.")("After it was run over by a steamroller, Norman was able to slide his ____________ under the door.") Rayburn reveled in this freewheeling new approach and often indulged in funny voices, banter with the celebrities, and mock arguments with the technical crew. It soon became the highest-rated show on daytime television.

From 1973 to 1977, Match Game was number one among all daytime network game shows—three of those years it was the highest rated of all daytime shows. The daytime revival of Match Game, which featured regular panelists Richard Dawson, Brett Somers, and Charles Nelson Reilly, ran until 1979 on CBS and another three years in first-run syndication. A concurrent nighttime version, Match Game PM, aired in syndication from 1975 to 1981. Rayburn was nominated three times for the Daytime Emmy Award for Outstanding Game Show Host.

During the years when Match Game was taped in Los Angeles (1973–1982), Rayburn lived in Osterville, Massachusetts, on Cape Cod. He commuted to California every two weeks to tape 12 shows over the course of a weekend (five daytime shows and one nighttime show per taping day).

In 1983, a year after the syndicated Match Game ended, the show was revived as part of the Match Game-Hollywood Squares Hour. Rayburn hosted the Match Game and "Super Match" segments and sat on the panel for the Hollywood Squares segment, which was hosted by Jon Bauman. This show lasted nine months on NBC. Rayburn, by most accounts, was disappointed with how the show turned out.

=== Other game shows and television appearances ===
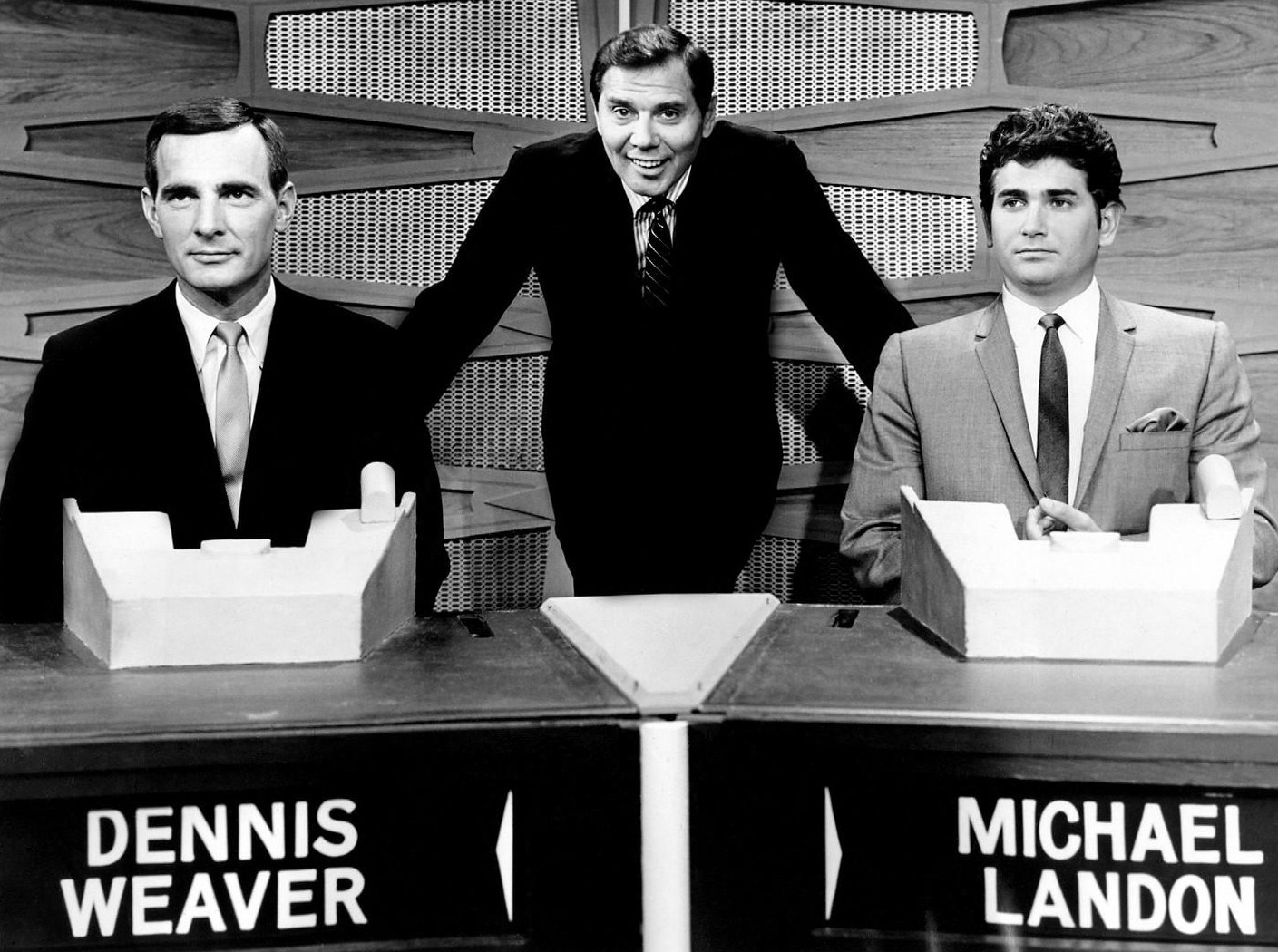
With Dennis Weaver and Michael Landon during a 1964 Match Game episode

During and between his Match Game years, Rayburn served as guest panelist on two other Goodson-Todman shows: What's My Line? and To Tell the Truth. Also during the run of the 1970s Match Game, Rayburn and his wife Helen appeared on the game show Tattletales, hosted by Bert Convy. Rayburn also hosted some episodes of Tattletales. Three years after the original Match Game was canceled, Rayburn hosted the short-lived Heatter-Quigley Productions show The Amateur's Guide to Love. In 1983, he hosted a pilot for Reg Grundy Productions titled Party Line, which later became Bruce Forsyth's Hot Streak.

In 1980, Rayburn was a guest star on the television show The Love Boat. Rayburn appeared as a contestant during a tournament of game show hosts on the original version of Card Sharks in 1980 and was a celebrity guest on Password Plus several times between 1980 and 1982. He appeared on Fantasy Island as a game show host—he and another host, played by Jan Murray, were game show rivals who vied to win the woman they both loved by creating the ultimate game show, with life-or-death consequences. He once hosted a local New York City show on WNEW-TV, Helluva Town, and between game show stints in 1982–1983, he returned to WNEW-TV as host of a weekly talk and lifestyles show titled Saturday Morning Live. He ended his brief tenure to return as co-host of Match Game-Hollywood Squares Hour.

Rayburn's last game show hosting duties were on 1985's Break the Bank (he was replaced by Joe Farago after 13 weeks), and The Movie Masters, an AMC game show that ran from 1989 to 1990. Just before production was to begin on a new Rayburn-emceed Match Game revival in 1987, an Entertainment Tonight reporter publicly disclosed that Rayburn was 69 years old, much older than many believed. Rayburn had trouble finding jobs after that, blaming the reporter for revealing his age and subjecting him to age discrimination. His daughter Lynne blamed this and the subsequent lack of work he received for sending him into a downward spiral.

Rayburn portrayed himself on a Saturday Night Live sketch in 1990, which featured Susan Lucci (as her character from All My Children, Erica Kane). He returned as one of Kane's many previous husbands, to stop another marriage (officiated by his old Choose Up Sides co-star Don Pardo) with the host of a game show portrayed by Phil Hartman. He also continued to make appearances on talk shows throughout the late 1980s and 1990s, usually to discuss classic game shows, including appearances on Vicki! and The Maury Povich Show and The Late Show with Ross Shafer (Shafer hosted the 1990 Match Game revival). In 1992, Rayburn also made an appearance on New York shock jock Howard Stern's late-night TV variety show as one of the stars of his Hollywood Squares parody, Homeless Howiewood Squares, in which homeless people were supposedly the contestants.

Rayburn co-hosted—with his wife and Peter Emmons—the Drum Corps International finals of the DCI Championship for two years, which were telecast on PBS from Philadelphia's Franklin Field in 1976 and Denver's original Mile High Stadium in 1977.

== Personal life and death ==
Rayburn was married to Helen Ticknor from 1940 until her death in October 1996. They had one child, daughter Lynne.

One of Rayburn's last TV appearances was a 1998 interview with Access Hollywood that was intended to coincide with the 25th anniversary of Match Game '73. Portions of the interview have been rebroadcast on Game Show Network which, in 2001, showed portions of another previously unaired interview during the first airing of its Match Game Blankathon.

Rayburn identified as a liberal politically and was a supporter of Planned Parenthood. Rayburn was also concerned that human overpopulation would become a problem in the 21st century and that it would become more difficult to supply resources, such as food, if the population grew too large. He expressed these concerns when he appeared on Game Show Hosts week on Card Sharks in 1980, where he played for Planned Parenthood as his favorite charity.

Rayburn enjoyed needlepoint and did it regularly on his many flights to and from California. He took it up when he knitted socks as a gag on Rayburn and Finch. Mark Goodson presented him with a needlepoint kit on the air as a gift when Match Game became the number one show on daytime television.

Though in poor health and suffering from dementia, Rayburn appeared in person to accept a Lifetime Achievement Award from the Academy of Television Arts & Sciences. A month later, on November 29, 1999, he died of heart failure at his daughter's home in Gloucester, Massachusetts, at age 81. He was cremated and his ashes spread in the garden of his daughter's home.

Rayburn's final TV appearance was in an interview for the A&E Biography episode profiling the life of his longtime boss Mark Goodson. Though taped in late 1999, the episode did not air until June 4, 2000, over six months after Rayburn had died.

== Filmography ==
Year	Title	Role	Notes
1959	It Happened to Jane	Himself – WTIC-TV Reporter	Uncredited
1979–1982	The Love Boat	Mason Randolph/Lyle/George Finley	3 episodes

== Awards and nominations ==
Year	Award	Category	Work	Result	Ref
1967	Primetime Emmy	Program and Individual Achievements in Daytime Programming	Individuals	Nominated	
1975	Daytime Emmy	Outstanding Host in a Game Show or Audience Participation Show	Match Game	Nominated	
1977	Daytime Emmy	Outstanding Host in a Game Show or Audience Participation Show	Match Game	Nominated	
1978	Daytime Emmy	Outstanding Host in a Game Show or Audience Participation Show	Match Game	Nominated	
1995	Broadcasting & Cable	Hall of Fame	Himself	Inducted	
1999	Academy of Television Arts & Sciences	Lifetime Achievement	Himself	Won	
