= Robert Q. Lewis =

American actor and broadcaster (1921–1991)

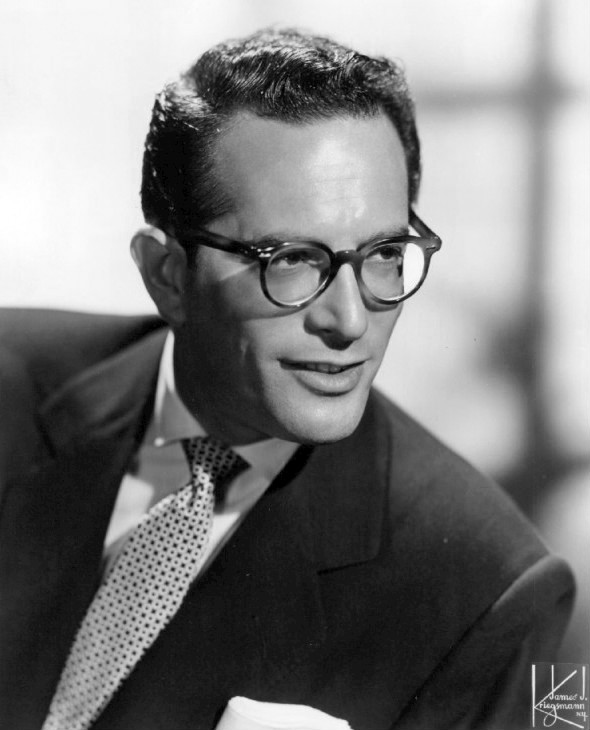
- Lewis in 1956
- Born: Robert Goldberg; April 25, 1921; New York City, U.S.
- Died: December 11, 1991 (aged 70); Los Angeles, California, U.S.
- Education: University of Michigan
- Occupations: Broadcaster; actor; television personality
- Years active: 1947–1986

Robert Q. Lewis (born Robert Goldberg; April 25, 1921 – December 11, 1991) was an American radio and television entertainer, comedian, game show host and actor. Although born with the Goldberg name, he grew up as Lewis, his father's professional name.

Lewis is perhaps best known for his game show participation, having been the first host of The Name's the Same, and regularly appearing on other Goodson-Todman panel shows. He also hosted and appeared on a multitude of TV shows from the 1940s through the 1970s.

His most distinguishing feature was his horn-rimmed glasses, to the point that the title card for his second Robert Q. Lewis Show used a drawing of such glasses as a logo. They were also mentioned in the title of his lecture. As a frequent guest panelist on What's My Line?, Lewis's blindfold featured a sketched pair of glasses.

== Biography ==
=== Early life ===
Lewis's parents were Jewish immigrants from Imperial Russia. His father, known professionally as Samuel I. Lewis, was a New York attorney.

"I was born on New York's west side and came from a simple and humble home, and went to P.S. 87 over on Amsterdam Avenue, where one gets a pretty good idea of true democracy," Lewis remarked in 1954. "After school all of us kids went to each other's houses and thought nothing of race, color, religion, or anything else. There just wasn't any difference. I didn't know there was a Jewish problem until I had graduated from high school and was in college," where fraternities discriminated against him.

=== Radio ===
In 1931, a 10-year-old Lewis made his debut on the local radio show "Dr. Posner's Kiddie Hour." This started his fascination with radio. That same year he set up a microphone and record player at home and became the family's disc jockey.

He enrolled in the University of Michigan in 1938, where he was a member of Phi Sigma Delta (later merged into Zeta Beta Tau), and graduated in 1941. He then became a staff announcer for WTRY, a radio station in Troy, New York—and on December 7, 1941, he was the only announcer in the building when news of the Pearl Harbor attack reached the station. In 1942, still at WTRY, he added the middle initial "Q" to his name accidentally while on the air. He was thinking of radio comedian F. Chase Taylor's character Colonel Lemuel Q. Stoopnagle, and "when I signed off, I declared 'This is Robert Q. Lewis.' I don't know why but that got lots of good reaction." He decided to retain the initial: "The luckiest ad lib in the world! It helped people remember me. Everyone wanted to know what the Q stood for." His own answer varied, "his favorite being Quackpot."

Lewis was drafted into the U.S. Army in 1942. He was sent to the Air Force's Radio Operating and Mechanic School in Sioux Falls, South Dakota, to build radio sets. "I always liked radio," Lewis recalled, "but who wants to put them together?" He joined the Special Services unit to put on camp shows, but after two bouts with pneumonia he was discharged from the service.

He then worked at three New York radio stations before joining CBS Radio. In 1947 staff announcer and disc jockey Robert Q. Lewis filled in for radio superstar Arthur Godfrey on Godfrey's popular morning show on the national network. Lewis did so well that Godfrey insisted that Lewis must always be the alternate host, a tremendous break for Lewis and a stepping stone for bigger things. Lewis got his own late-afternoon network show, but continued to substitute for Godfrey until at least 1959.

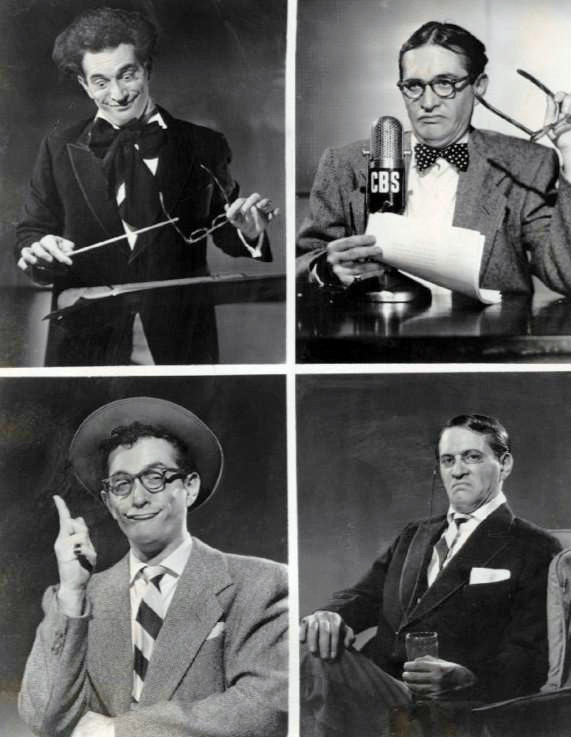
Publicity photo from Lewis's 1949 radio show.

Among those who served as writers on Lewis's radio programs were playwright Neil Simon, author and dramatist Paddy Chayefsky, and radio comedy writer Goodman Ace. Simon, Chayefsky, and Ace headed a CBS team of comedy writers that acted largely as "script doctors" for existing shows in need of fixing. Ace was frustrated over a CBS revamp of the show he assembled for Lewis, The Little Show: "I give them a good, tight, 15-minute comedy show," Ace told Time, "and what do they do? Expand it to half an hour and throw in an orchestra and an audience. Who the hell said a comedy show had to be half an hour, Marconi? Ida Cantor?"

In 1949, Lewis had a 30-minute sustaining (unsponsored) program broadcast on CBS Monday - Friday at 4:30 p.m. ET featuring the Howard Smith Orchestra. The Ames Brothers and Eugenie Baird were regular performers. In addition to Lewis's comedy, the show included audience participation, as several people in the studio answered a question posed by Lewis. A review in the trade publication Variety called Lewis "a bright spot on the afternoon spectrum." Future talk-show host and producer Merv Griffin often sang on Lewis's network radio show; Griffin later married Lewis's secretary, Julann Wright.

Besides Lewis's many guest appearances on variety programs and game shows in the early years of TV, his favorite medium as host continued with radio, first for CBS and later as a disc jockey in Los Angeles. One of his radio series, Robert Q.'s Waxworks, was devoted to playing old records, setting a pattern that later radio personalities such as Dr. Demento would follow. Lewis's interview-based program was heard locally on KFI, Los Angeles, in 1972.

=== Television ===
Lewis was an early arrival on network TV, presiding over more than one series at a time. The Robert Q. Lewis Show had a six-month run on CBS's Sunday night lineup from July 16, 1950 to January 7, 1951. He hosted CBS's talent-search variety show, The Show Goes On from January 19, 1950, to February 16, 1952. He also had two CBS daytime variety shows. The first, Robert Q's Matinee, was a 45-minute daily show which ran from October 16, 1950 to January 19, 1951.

The second, more successful The Robert Q. Lewis Show ran on CBS on weekday afternoons from January 11, 1954 to May 25, 1956. Similar to the concurrent Arthur Godfrey show, the Lewis program featured a company of regulars: singers Earl Wrightson, Lois Hunt, Jaye P. Morgan, and Jan Arden; dancer Don Liberto; announcer Lee Vines, and bandleader Ray Bloch. The key to the program's success was its informality, as columnist Ed Meyerson observed: "The woman of the house doesn't want actors in her living room, she wants company—and when it comes to seeing them every afternoon, there's to be no standing on ceremony. Every member of the cast is seen as a person as well as a performer."

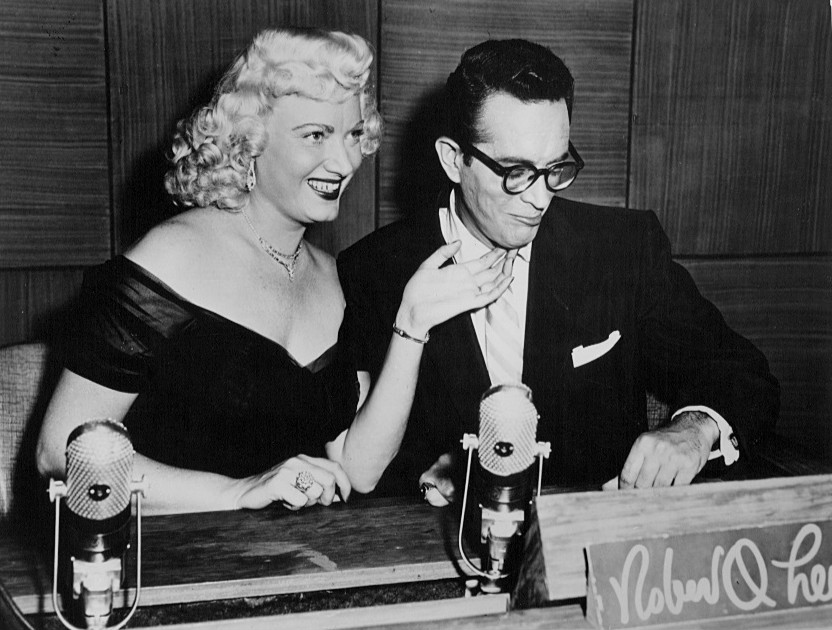
Lewis, as the host of the show, with the celebrity guest Dagmar in The Name's the Same, 1952.

In addition to his daytime-TV duties, Lewis became a fixture on TV quiz shows in the 1950s and 1960s. In 1952, he settled into his most enduring game-show role as host of ABC's The Name's the Same. The show featured a celebrity panel trying to guess the identities of contestants who had famous names: Napoleon Bonaparte, Marilyn Monroe, Virginia Beach, etc. On a few occasions, contestants appeared on the show bearing the name Robert Q. Lewis.

At the end of the August 31, 1954 broadcast, Lewis frankly told his viewers that the show would not be back the following week, and he didn't know if it would be returning. As it developed, the show was canceled as TV's fall season began, and the longtime sponsor (Swanson canned and frozen poultry) followed Lewis to CBS and sponsored his variety show. ABC brought The Name's the Same back on November 29, 1954 with new host Dennis James, new sponsor Ralston-Purina, and new theme music ("Meet Me in St. Louis"), in reference to the sponsor's location).

Lewis remained a busy performer, appearing as a nightclub headliner in the United States and Canada, Beginning in 1958, Lewis was forced to change careers. "My kind of show -- the informal, anything-goes daytime thing -- is in disrepute since filmed syndication took over [i.e., local stations filling afternoon hours with their own libraries of movies and TV episodes] and it's affected all of us -- [Arthur] Godfrey, [Garry] Moore." He became less known as an entertainer and more familiar as a personality on TV game shows. He hosted the short-lived original version of Make Me Laugh. In 1962, he substituted for and ultimately replaced Merv Griffin as host of Play Your Hunch. In 1964, he hosted the short-lived game show Get the Message on ABC.

He was a frequent participant on What's My Line?, making 40 appearances in all. He first appeared as a panelist in 1951, about a year into the show's run. His most regular run was alternating weeks with comedian Fred Allen following the departure of regular panelist Steve Allen, beginning in 1954 through early 1955; Fred Allen ultimately took the spot on a regular basis for approximately a year until his death. Lewis made regular guest appearances up to the show's final year in 1967. He also made one appearance as the show's "Mystery Guest" in 1955. He was a guest panelist/player on a number of other Goodson-Todman shows also.

Lewis was often recruited to fill in for performers who were ill or otherwise unable to perform. Arthur Godfrey had first call on his services. Jackie Gleason invited "Robert Q. Lewis and His Gang" to take over his American Scene Magazine time slot while he was away. In April 1962 Lewis took over the game show Number Please for two weeks. In January 1965 he was the substitute host of To Tell the Truth for four weeks, while moderator Bud Collyer was convalescing from a heart attack. These emergency replacements became part of Lewis's comic monologue; he'd tell how he called his mother asking her to watch him on CBS, only to hear her say, "Oh? Who's sick?"

=== Records ===
Lewis performed vintage music, including Tin Pan Alley songs, on his radio and televisions program and in nightclub performances. From the 1940s, he recorded for Columbia Records, MGM Records, and Coral Records. His 1951 song "Where's-a Your House? was an answer record to Rosemary Clooney's "Come On-a My House". In 1967, he recorded "I'm Just Wild About Vaudeville" for Atco, a collection of songs from around 1930 in which he imitated various signing styles of the period.

=== Movies and TV ===
Lewis's fondness for show-business nostalgia was well known within the industry, and in 1949 he was hired to narrate the "lighter side" segment of the feature-length March of Time documentary film The Golden Twenties. He was too busy to pursue a movie career at the time because of his hectic radio, television, and nightclub schedule. He did confess to one screen ambition—starring in remakes of old Harold Lloyd comedies like The Milky Way and The Freshman—but he was unable to obtain remake rights, which were still controlled by Lloyd.

Later in his career, Lewis acted in a few movies, notably An Affair to Remember (1957), Good Neighbor Sam (1964), Ski Party (1965), How to Succeed in Business Without Really Trying (1967), Everything You Always Wanted to Know About Sex* (*But Were Afraid to Ask) (1972), and the TV movie The Law (1974), in which he played a dinner speaker at a lawyers' convention. He also appeared on a number of television series, including Room for One More; The Hathaways; Branded; The Patty Duke Show; Ichabod and Me; Bewitched; Love, American Style; and Emergency!, among others.

=== Rise and fall ===
Lewis was at once the envy of his show-business peers and a victim of his own success. He made himself available to so many programs when television was new that he dominated the airwaves. A 1954 report syndicated by United Press International commented on his busy schedule that included recording sessions, nightclub dates, and telethons: "Now with 12 radio and TV shows a week, Lewis will no longer have time to be Godfrey's stand-in." (He found the time, and remained with Godfrey for five more years.)

Lewis was so well established that networks and sponsors often chose him over other performers, who resented his omnipresence. Comedian Orson Bean told entertainment historian Kliph Nesteroff an "inside show biz" joke that made the rounds: "There's the story about the guy who falls off a building, hits an awning as he's coming down, slides off the awning as a hay truck is driving by, and lands right in the hay. Someone says, 'God, you have got to be the luckiest guy in the world!' The guy says 'No. Robert Q. Lewis.'"

Lewis had become a media standard by the end of the 1950s, which led network executives to conclude that he'd had too much exposure. They now hired him far less often, forcing him to take whatever jobs came his way. "I don't think audiences had gotten tired of seeing me around, but I do think I was overexposed to advertising agencies and network executives. Anyway, nobody would hire me." Lewis wryly commented on his underemployment in a press release for one of his records: "With this recording Robert Q. Lewis adds a glorious new chapter to his long career as disc jockey, comedian, panel moderator, replacement, actor, and bartender. At this particular moment, he is available for bookings of any kind. Contact Martin Baum, GAC, Hollywood. Thanks very much."

=== Theater ===
Beginning in 1961, when his television work dried up temporarily, Lewis became a familiar face on the live-theater circuit. "Most people think that stock companies today consist of summer stock in summer theaters. That's nonsense. There's fall stock, winter stock, and spring stock, all around the country. And if you've had television exposure, you can make good money playing in every contemporary American comedy written in the last 20 years and playing in them all over the country." Lewis starred in road-company versions of Broadway hits, including The Tunnel of Love, The Seven Year Itch, Bells Are Ringing, Cabaret, and The Odd Couple. He continued to make sporadic acting appearances until a few years before his death.

Lewis commented on his work as a character actor in 1966: "These glasses have always been my trademark. That's why it's so much fun to work without them. Look, I become an entirely different person -- even to me -- without my glasses. With them on, I just feel like a sweet, average guy, but when I take them off I'm no longer Robert Q. Lewis. I become, well, sort of a Jewish Victor Jory."

=== Personal life and death ===
Robert Q. Lewis was a lifelong collector of paintings and sculptures, ranging from fine artworks to circus posters. He began his collection as a child, when an uncle took him along on a visit to Pablo Picasso in Paris. Picasso liked the boy and inscribed a drawing personally to Lewis. A columnist visiting his New York apartment noted that "a Picasso print on one wall and a Gauguin on another hold their own against three bathing beauties of the early 1900s on a third wall. These last are framed postcards from Bob's collection of souvenir postcards. He's a demon collector."

Lewis never married, although he did have three serious relationships. His first girlfriend was a childhood sweetheart named Eileen, and they stayed together through high school. Just before he entered college he broached the subject of marriage, only to meet with disapproval from her father. Robert Q. told the story to a magazine columnist, who wrote, "Were Robert a shoe salesman, a bookkeeper, or even, at least by inference, a race track tout, Papa would have no objections. But his daughter marry a radio actor? To Robert's dismay, Eileen backed Papa up. She wanted, she said, a 'normal' life."

Lewis was engaged twice, "once to a very nice girl. I was detained at a business conference and showed up late for a bridge game. She decided she didn't want to have her life disrupted." The report concluded, "His other fiancée was in show business. Gallantly, Bob doesn't explain what broke that one up, but he takes the blame." According to a 1954 profile, "he is one of the most sought-after bachelors of all time, averaging some 150 proposals a week."

Lewis was a heavy smoker and died of emphysema in Century City Hospital on December 11, 1991. He had no survivors.

A collection of Lewis's personal papers, notes, and scripts, covering roughly the years 1940–1960, were formerly housed at the Thousand Oaks Library in Thousand Oaks, California, and are now located at the University of California, Santa Barbara Library.

== Filmography ==
Film
Year	Title	Role	Notes
1949	The Golden Twenties	Himself - Narrator	
1957	An Affair to Remember	Himself - Announcer	
1964	Good Neighbor Sam	Earl	
1965	Ski Party	Mr. Pevney	
1966	Ride Beyond Vengeance	The Hotel Clerk	
1967	How to Succeed in Business Without Really Trying	Tackaberry	
1972	Everything You Always Wanted to Know About Sex* (*But Were Afraid to Ask)	Himself	
1979	C.H.O.M.P.S.	Merkle	
1983	I'm Going to Be Famous	Himself	
1986	My Chauffeur	Businessman	(final film role)
