= The Name's the Same =

American TV game show series (1951–1955)

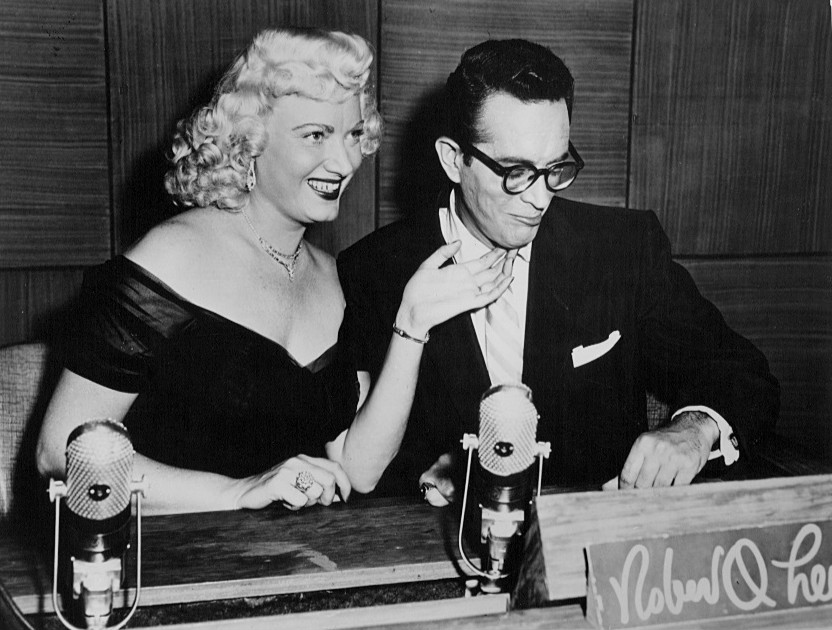
- Host Robert Q. Lewis with celebrity guest Dagmar, 1952
- Directed by: Jerome Schnur; Herbert Hirschman
- Presented by: Robert Q. Lewis; Dennis James; Bob Elliott & Ray Goulding; Clifton Fadiman
- Announcer: Lee Vines
- Country of origin: United States
- No. of seasons: 4

Production
- Producers: Mark Goodson; Bill Todman
- Running time: 22 minutes

Original release
- Network: ABC
- Release: December 5, 1951 – October 7, 1955

The Name's the Same is an American game show produced by Goodson-Todman for the ABC television network from December 5, 1951 to August 31, 1954, followed by a run from October 25, 1954 to October 7, 1955. The premise was for contestants to guess the names of persons whose actual name corresponded to a famous person, celebrity, a place, common object or action.

It was originally sponsored by Bendix home appliances (a division of Avco), then on alternate weeks for the next two years by Swanson canned and frozen poultry, and by Johnson Wax. After a brief hiatus in late 1954, the series returned under the new sponsorship of Ralston Purina; Clorets and Chicken of the Sea tuna also signed on as sponsors.

== Moderators ==
Robert Q. Lewis was the original host and moderator from December 5, 1951 to August 31, 1954. When Lewis was vacationing, Conrad Nagel, Brian Aherne, and Clifton Fadiman substituted for him. After Lewis' final show, where he implied the show's future was in doubt, The Name's the Same went on hiatus, giving Lewis more time to devote to his daytime variety shows on CBS. Swanson followed Lewis, abandoning The Name's the Same. (Announcer Lee Vines continued with Lewis on CBS.)

The Name's the Same returned on October 25, 1954 with a new set, and Ralston Purina joined as the sponsor. During this 39-week run the moderators changed: Dennis James hosted for 18 weeks, through April 4, 1955; Bob and Ray shared the moderators' duties for 10 weeks, from April 11, 1955 to June 21, 1955. Clifton Fadiman returned to the emcee's chair on June 28, 1955, hosting for 11 weeks through the final episode on October 7, 1955.

== Panelists ==
The only panelist to remain for the show's entire run was New York-based actress and socialite Joan Alexander in the second chair. The original two co-panelists with Alexander were author and comedian Abe Burrows in the first chair, and TV personality Bill Cullen in the third chair. After six weeks Cullen, who became increasingly busy with his own programs, was replaced by composer Meredith Willson. Burrows left the show in November 1952, a victim of the Red Scare. Comedian Jerry Lester took over the first chair on December 23, 1952, followed by comedian Carl Reiner on April 14, 1953. Willson stayed on until July 1953, and his place on the panel was taken by ABC sportscaster Bill Stern. On September 15, 1953, Reiner left and Alexander and Stern were joined by New York radio personality Gene Rayburn.

On February 9, 1954, the panel's makeup was adjusted and Bess Myerson, Miss America 1945, was added to the panel to replace Bill Stern and a fourth panelist was added to the game. That fourth panelist was originally Sherlock Holmes portrayer Basil Rathbone, but he left on April 6, 1954 and was replaced by Texaco Star Theater regular Arnold Stang. Stang then left on May 18, 1954 and was replaced by humorist Roger Price, who stayed on until the final episode.

In January 1955, Rayburn and Myerson left the panel and were replaced by The Jackie Gleason Show's Audrey Meadows and New York Herald Tribune columnist and future To Tell the Truth regular Hy Gardner. Gardner was replaced by actor Walter Slezak in March 1955, who in turn left in July due to a time slot switch. Mike Wallace, then a fledgling journalist, took over as the last permanent panelist.

Many celebrities of the era were guest panelists: Morey Amsterdam, Garry Moore, Hal Block, Cliff Norton, Jackie Cooper, Peter Donald, Dane Clark, Hans Conried, Russell Crouse, John Henry Faulk, John Forsythe, Laraine Day, Marc Connelly, Denise Lor, and Hildy Parks.

== Game play ==
Each standard round featured a contestant who had a "famous name": the contestant's full name was the same as either an actual person ("Jane Russell," "Abraham Lincoln," "Napoleon Bonaparte"), a place ("Virginia Beach," "Monte Carlo"), a thing ("A. Lap," "A. Table," "Ruby Lips," “A. Mattress”), or an action ("I. Draw", "Will Kiss").

It was always made clear that the names used on the show were authentic. The show's legal experts would check birth certificates, hospital records and other forms of verification to affirm the names' authenticity.

The contestant was introduced and referred to throughout the game as "Mr. X" (or "Mrs./Miss/Master X"). A small curtain was opened to the audience, showing a placard with the contestant's name, along with a drawing depicting the namesake, famous people were often caricatured.

The panelists were allocated 10 questions each, with the number remaining denoted in running tally on the wall behind them. The questions had to be "yes or no" questions, and were posed to the contestant as if they were the person, place, or thing their name represented, with the contestant answering as their namesake.

The panel could pass to save some of their questions for later on in the game. Any member of the panel who failed to identify the contestant's name wrote the contestant a check for $25, meaning each contestant won either $50 if their name was guessed by a panelist, or $75 if it was not. When a fourth panelist was added in early 1954, the check amounts were decreased to $20 per panelist, making the prizes $60 for a correct guess and $80 if the panel was stumped.

Many of the contestants' names lent themselves to comedy. Robert Q. Lewis would always call on Carl Reiner first when the mystery name was a thing: Reiner's innocent questions always took on funny meanings, followed by Joan Alexander straying even farther away, to the delight of the studio audience. For "A. Harem," Reiner asked, "Is this thing used for recreational purposes?" and Alexander pursued this: "Do fat men use this to reduce their weight?" Lewis would enjoy these detours as much as the audience. It was then left to Bill Stern, a veteran reporter, to zero in on the actual name with serious, shrewd questioning.

Sometimes a contestant's celebrity namesake was brought out at the end of the round to surprise the contestant, other times, a celebrity was the guest without pretext. The celebrity then played a special round called "I'd Like To Be..." in which the panel tried to guess, in the same fashion as with civilians, who the celebrity would like to be if they could be anyone else. In late 1953, "I'd Like To Be..." was replaced with "Secret Wish," in which the panel attempted to guess something that the guest would secretly like to do or have happen (for example, Kirk Douglas wished to coach the Vassar lacrosse team, and Van Johnson wanted Marilyn Monroe to sit on his lap). The celebrity's winnings ($50/$75, later $60/$80) went to his or her favorite charity.

A few times near the end of the run, host Clifton Fadiman would welcome the panel, then reveal the episode's guest to the studio and home audience. The curtain would pull back with the guest standing behind it in place of the usual caricature.

A typical episode contained four rounds - two standard rounds, the celebrity round, and then a final standard round, some episodes would feature one less or one more standard round. At the end of each episode, each panelist would tell how much money they "lost" followed by a good-night.

== Theme ==
For most of the show's run, the theme for The Name's the Same was a busy string arrangement called "Shooting Star" by Sidney Torch. This was used until the program's last 11 episodes, when an instrumental version of "Meet Me in St. Louis, Louis" by Kerry Mills was used (Ralston Purina of St. Louis was the show's sponsor).

== Foreign versions ==
A UK version was made for radio (BBC Home Service) and TV (BBC Television) with British namesakes of famous people, buildings and things. It ran on TV from 1954 to 1955 with Bernard Braden as the original host, later replaced by Peter Martyn.

A one-off revival edition was produced for BBC Four in 2005 as part of a season of programs detailing the "lost decade."

== Episode status ==
At least some episodes with all four regular hosts were saved as kinescope films. Most recently, the show aired in reruns on GSN at 3:30 a.m. ET every morning following What's My Line? in GSN's "Black & White Overnight" block. The latest run began on July 14, 2008, with an episode from August 6, 1952, and ended on December 2, 2008 with the series finale. Episodes hosted by Lewis were added to the Buzzr schedule in January 2018, then removed from the schedule in January 2019.

Several episodes rerun by GSN are available in their original, uncut form (e.g., with commercials and uncrunched credits) in the collectors' trading circuit, as well as from "public-domain" dealers like Shokus Video. One of these is from April 25, 1955, in which famous clown Emmett Kelly fulfills his "Secret Wish," painting co-host Ray Goulding's face like that of a clown.
