= Match Game-Hollywood Squares Hour =

Hybrid game show

- Created by: Mark Goodson, Bill Todman, Merrill Heatter and Bob Quigley
- Based on: Match Game; Hollywood Squares
- Directed by: Marc Breslow
- Presented by: Gene Rayburn (Match Game segments); Jon Bauman (Hollywood Squares segment)
- Announcer: Gene Wood; Johnny Olson; Rich Jeffries
- Composer: Edd Kalehoff
- Country of origin: United States
- No. of episodes: 191

Production
- Producer: Robert Sherman
- Production locations: NBC Studios; Burbank, California
- Running time: approx. 44 Minutes
- Production companies: Mark Goodson Productions; Orion Television

Original release
- Network: NBC
- Release: October 31, 1983 – July 27, 1984

Match Game-Hollywood Squares Hour is an American television panel game show that combined two panel games of the 1960s and 1970s – Match Game and Hollywood Squares – into an hour-long format.

The series ran from October 31, 1983, to July 27, 1984 on NBC. Gene Rayburn reprised his role as host of the Match Game and Super Match segments, while Jon Bauman hosted the Hollywood Squares segment. Gene Wood was the show's regular announcer with Johnny Olson and Rich Jeffries substituting during the run.

The series was credited as a Mark Goodson Television Production. Orion Television, then-owners of the Hollywood Squares format rights, licensed the format to Goodson.

== Rules ==
=== Match Game ===
Each day began with two new contestants playing Match Game, hosted by Rayburn and with Bauman sitting in the bottom left seat of a six-celebrity panel.

Three rounds were played, with one question per contestant in each round. A coin toss determined who played first in round one, and the high scorer at the end of each round played first in the next one. In the event of a tie, the contestant who had not played first in that round did so in the next one.

Rayburn read a humorous fill-in-the-blank question, and each celebrity wrote down a response. The contestant provided a verbal response after they had all finished; the celebrities then revealed their answers one at a time, and each match scored a point. Only the celebrities who had not yet matched a contestant played on subsequent turns by that person. The leader after the third round advanced to face the returning champion in the second half of the hour on Hollywood Squares. Any contestant who reached the maximum score of six in either the first or second round sat out the rest of the game.

If the game ended in a tie, one Super Match-style question was posed to the contestants (e.g., "_____, New Jersey"). Instead of writing down an answer, the contestants were shown a board with four numbered responses pre-selected by the writers (e.g., "Atlantic City", "Hoboken", "Newark", "Trenton") and kept out of sight of the panel. A backstage draw conducted before the game determined which contestant chose first, and each contestant chose a response by calling out its number. After both contestants made their choices, Rayburn polled the panel one at a time for their own responses. The first contestant to match any celebrity became the winner.

=== Hollywood Squares ===
In the Hollywood Squares half of the show, hosted by Bauman, pitted the Match Game winner against the previous day's champion.

For Hollywood Squares, three more celebrities joined the panel along with Rayburn, who sat in the bottom left square and replaced Bauman. A third tier of the panel set swung into place to accommodate the new panelists, and the celebrity who was already sitting in the top center seat for Match Game became the center square. As on the original Hollywood Squares, contestants took turns attempting to claim squares on a tic-tac-toe board. The contestant in control chose a celebrity, who answered a question. A contestant claimed a celebrity's square by correctly agreeing or disagreeing with the answer. A miss awarded it to the opponent. The first contestant to get three of his/her own symbol in a row (horizontal, vertical, or diagonal) or capture five squares won the game.

There were several differences in game play compared to the original Hollywood Squares. The champion always played "X" and the opponent played "O". This has been the only version of Hollywood Squares not to use the traditional exclusive roles for male as "Mr. X" and females as "Ms. O". Each individual square earned was worth $25. The first game was worth $100, and the value increased by $100 for each subsequent game. No "Secret Square" was played in this version. Most questions asked were of the true/false or multiple choice variety.

The most significant rule change involved winning a game. On all versions of Hollywood Squares before and since, if a contestant missed a question on a square that the opponent needed for a win, control simply passed back to the opponent and they had to earn the square on their own. This version of Hollywood Squares eliminated that rule, enabling a contestant to win a game due to an opponent's incorrect response.

The contestants played as many games as time allowed, with the champion starting the first game and the loser of each game starting the next one. When the final bell rang, the contestant in the lead became the day's champion and joined Rayburn on stage to play the Super Match bonus round. Both contestants kept any money they earned in this segment. In the event of a tie, the board was cleared and the contestant who did not play last chose one star. The contestant won an additional $25 and the match by correctly agreeing or disagreeing with the star's answer. If the contestant failed, the opponent won.

=== Super Match ===
The champion played for a grand prize of up to $30,000 in the Super Match, again hosted by Rayburn and with Bauman sitting at bottom left. The round began with the Audience Match, in which the champion tried to match one of the three most popular responses given by a previous studio audience to a short phrase. (e.g., "Trading ______ .") The champion called on any three celebrities for help, and could either use one of their responses or offer one of his/her own. The three most-popular responses awarded $1,000, $500, and $250 in descending order. The champion won $100 for failing to match one of the three most-popular responses.

For the Head-to-Head Match, the champion attempted to match with one celebrity of his/her choice. Each celebrity had a card with a hidden number. Four celebrities had a 10, four had a 20, and one had a 30. Once chosen, the celebrity revealed the number and it was multiplied by the amount of the Audience Match to determine the jackpot.

Rayburn read the phrase to the celebrity, who wrote an answer to fill in the blank. The champion was then asked to provide one of his/her own. If both answers matched, the champion won the Super Match and the jackpot. The celebrity and champion had to match exactly.

Regardless of the result of the Super Match, the champion returned on the next episode to play Hollywood Squares against the next day's Match Game winner. Champions remained on the show until they either lost to a challenger or played the Super Match five times. If a champion retired, a contestant was chosen at random to fill the "X" position on the next day's Hollywood Squares segment.

== Broadcast history ==
The Match Game-Hollywood Squares Hour debuted on October 31, 1983, at 3:00 PM in the Eastern time zone (2:00 PM in the Central and Pacific time zones and 1:00 PM in the Mountain time zone) on NBC. Both Match Game and Hollywood Squares had been aired on NBC, with (The) Match Game (albeit with different rules) airing from 1962 to 1969 and (The) Hollywood Squares airing from 1966 to 1980.

The program's only regular panelists were its co-hosts. Bauman — who appeared as himself and not as his Sha Na Na character Bowzer — sat on the panel during Match Game and the Super Match, while Rayburn took his place during Hollywood Squares. The most frequent semi-regular was actress Nedra Volz, who appeared for nine weeks. Mr. Smith star Leonard Frey and returning Match Game regular Charles Nelson Reilly each appeared for seven weeks. Other panelists who were previous Match Game regulars or semi-regulars included Fannie Flagg (who appeared for four weeks), McLean Stevenson, Dick Martin, Jimmie Walker, Marcia Wallace, Fred Travalena, Soupy Sales (who had appeared more frequently on the original 1960s version of The Match Game) and Bill Daily. Bauman himself, as Bowzer, had also previously appeared on Match Game. George Gobel and Abby Dalton, who each appeared for two weeks, were the only former Hollywood Squares regulars to return.

Following the practice of both parent shows, the same group of eight celebrity guests appeared on an entire week of episodes. Five were introduced at the start of the episode to play Match Game. At the end of that segment, the remaining three emerged onstage for Hollywood Squares. Aside from Rayburn and Bauman, the panelists rotated so that different groups of three played only Hollywood Squares from one day to the next.

Cast members of other NBC series often appeared on the show. It was also a starting point for new, unknown and up-and-coming stars who went on to greater fame, such as future late-night talk show hosts Jay Leno and Arsenio Hall. Game show hosts also appeared on the show, including Bill Cullen, Bob Eubanks, Pat Sajak, Bill Rafferty, and Chuck Woolery (who promoted Scrabble during the week before it premiered). David Ruprecht, then the host of Real People, also appeared as a panelist in early 1984, and would go on to host Supermarket Sweep. The cast of Leave It to Beaver reunited for one week of shows at the end of 1983, while a week in May 1984 featured NBC soap opera stars. Other special weeks in 1984 featured the casts of Too Close for Comfort and St. Elsewhere, as well as a salute to the 1950s with film and television stars from that decade.

NBC scheduled the series opposite the highly-rated soap operas General Hospital and Guiding Light. Near the end of its run, network executives announced plans to begin production of the Dobson Productions-created soap opera Santa Barbara, which resulted in the show's cancellation. Its final episode aired on July 27, 1984.

== Aftermath ==
The original Hollywood Squares host Peter Marshall, in his autobiography, states that he expected to be asked to host the Hollywood Squares portion once he heard that they had secured Rayburn's participation, but he was never approached. He also admitted having some schadenfreude at the show's cancellation, saying: "I kind of hate to admit that I was happy when it didn't even last one season." In a 2022 interview, Marshall said that he was not upset that he was replaced as host and was pleased with later hosts of the series, while explicitly excluding Bauman.

This version of Hollywood Squares was the most recent to air on a broadcast network until 2025. In 1986, a syndicated revival aired for three years with John Davidson as host. A further revival, hosted by Tom Bergeron, aired in syndication from 1998 to 2004. A hip hop-themed series based on the format, Hip Hop Squares, aired on MTV2 in 2012, and was revived for VH1 in 2017. A fourth spinoff, this one focusing primarily on country music, Nashville Squares, debuted on CMT in 2019. Four years later, in 2023, a Black culture-themed version called Celebrity Squares, hosted by D.C. Young Fly, premiered on VH1. This was in addition to several parodies and one-offs of varying degrees of official endorsement. Howard Stern's version, Homeless Howiewood Squares, included Rayburn reprising his role as a regular panelist. A new version of Hollywood Squares with Nate Burleson as host premiered in prime time on CBS in January 2025, the first version to air on broadcast television since Match Game-Hollywood Squares Hour was canceled.

Match Game did not return until a revival on ABC in 1990, with Ross Shafer as host. Match Game was again revived in 1998, hosted by Michael Burger. Each lasted one season. Match Game was used as one of the semifinal games in CBS' Summer 2006 airing of Gameshow Marathon hosted by Ricki Lake. A version of the show produced in Canada aired for two seasons beginning in 2012, and a prime time version on ABC debuted in 2016 with Alec Baldwin as host from 2016 to 2021 and in 2025 with Martin Short.

Rayburn went on to host two more game shows: Break the Bank (from which he was fired after 13 weeks) and the short-lived game The Movie Masters for AMC from 1989 to 1990. Bauman, whose only other hosting credit was the concurrent The Pop 'N Rocker Game, has not hosted another game show since.

The show's main theme, composed by Edd Kalehoff, and its variants were eventually used as car and prize cues on The Price Is Right and was also used on Card Sharks from the fall of 1986 until the CBS run ended in March 1989 when new cars were announced.

== Reruns ==
Prior to 2019, the program had never been re-broadcast due to cross-ownership issues between MGM (Orion’s successor and copyright owner for Hollywood Squares episodes produced until 1989), Fremantle (Goodson/Todman’s successor), the CBS Media Ventures division of Paramount Global (successor to King World Productions and current rightsholder to the show's format since 1991 and episodes produced since 1998) and the distribution agents originally responsible for the original NBC run until Fremantle's digital multicast network, Buzzr, aired four episodes (the Tuesday-Friday shows of premiere week) on February 17, 2019. Buzzr also mentioned that they will be working on digitizing and cleaning up the original master tapes in order to get the show on their regular schedule later in the year. Fremantle noted that the addition was being done for two reasons: to increase the number of Match Game episodes available for the network to rerun, and to add some form of Hollywood Squares (which the network does not own) onto the channel's lineup. Former host Bauman wrote on Twitter, "Understand that this was the only completely honest version of Hwd Squares ever where no Squares were sitting there with the punch lines of the jokes in front of them."

On September 30, 2019, Buzzr began airing reruns of the program.
