= ¿Qué dicen los famosos? =

- Genre: Game show
- Based on: Family Feud by Mark Goodson
- Presented by: Rodrigo Vidal
- Country of origin: United States
- Original language: Spanish
- No. of seasons: 1
- No. of episodes: 27

Production
- Executive producers: Macarena Moreno; Pancho Calvo
- Production company: Fremantle

Original release
- Network: Telemundo
- Release: October 2, 2022 – December 31, 2023

¿Qué dicen los famosos? (English: What Do The Celebrities Say?) is an American Spanish-language version of the game show Celebrity Family Feud. The show premiered on Telemundo on October 2, 2022. The series is hosted by Rodrigo Vidal. Each episode features teams of celebrities playing as a family for charity.

== Format ==
Two teams of celebrities, each represented by four members, compete to determine the answers to survey questions. Each round begins with a "face-off" question to see which team will gain control of that particular question. The team with the highest number of points after five rounds of play wins the game. At the end of the main game, the winning team selects two celebrities to play the bonus round, known as "Fast Money".

== Episodes ==
This list follows the order on Telemundo's website, which feature the episodes in the original production order, ignoring the order of broadcast.

No.	Title	Original release date	U.S. viewers (millions)
1	"La casa de los famosos vs. Top Chef VIP"	October 2, 2022	0.65
2	"Garibaldi vs. Gente de Zona"	October 9, 2022	0.62
3	"Mariana Seoane vs. Cristián de la Fuente"	October 16, 2022	0.58
4	"Banda Carnaval vs. Calibre 50"	October 23, 2022	0.50
5	"Mauricio Garza vs. Litzy Domínguez"	December 11, 2022	0.70
6	"Magneto vs. KBH"	October 30, 2022	0.59
7	"Exatlón: Contendientes vs. Famosos"	November 20, 2022	0.66
8	"CNCO vs. Gerardo Ortíz"	November 6, 2022	0.58
9	"Plutarco Haza vs. Carmen Aub"	November 12, 2023	N/A
10	"Roberto Palazuelos vs. Adamari López"	December 4, 2022	0.62
11	"Sonora Dinamita vs. El Recodo"	November 13, 2022	0.63
12	"Elyfer Torres vs. Polo Monárrez"	December 31, 2023	N/A
13	"Los Pichichis vs. Los Meros Meros"	December 25, 2022	0.80
14	"La casa de los famosos 1 vs. La casa de los famosos 2"	January 8, 2023	0.85
15	"Sergio Mayer vs. Erika Buenfil"	September 17, 2023	0.38
16	"Los Recoditos vs. Los Beltrán"	November 11, 2023	N/A
17	"Sara Maldonado vs. Itatí Cantoral"	September 24, 2023	0.45
18	"Charytín vs. Sergio Goyri"	November 26, 2023	N/A
19	"Armando Araiza vs. Geraldine Bazán"	December 9, 2023	N/A
20	"Laura Flores vs. Sergio Sendel"	November 19, 2023	N/A
21	"Maripily vs. Vanessa Guzmán"	November 11, 2023	N/A
22	"Marlene Favela vs. Arturo Carmona"	October 22, 2023	0.43
23	"Sylvia Pasquel vs. Laura Zapata"	October 1, 2023	0.44
24	"Kika Edgar vs. Luis Ernesto Franco"	November 18, 2023	N/A
25	"Adictiva vs. Inesperadas"	November 27, 2022	0.82
26	"Gaby Spanic vs. Jimena Gállego"	December 2, 2023	N/A
27	"Paty Navidad vs. Jorge Aravena"	December 3, 2023	N/A

== Reception ==
=== Ratings ===
Viewership and ratings per season of ¿Qué dicen los famosos?
Season	Episodes	First aired		Last aired		Avg. viewers (millions)
Season	Episodes	Date	Viewers (millions)	Date	Viewers (millions)	Avg. viewers (millions)
1	17	October 2, 2022	0.65	December 31, 2023	TBD	0.61

=== Awards and nominations ===
Year	Award	Category	Nominated	Result	Ref
2023	Produ Awards	Best Competition Series	¿Qué dicen los famosos?	Nominated	
2023	Produ Awards	Best Content Under Sustainable Production	¿Qué dicen los famosos?	Nominated	
