= He Said, She Said (game show) =

- Created by: Mark Goodson & Bill Todman
- Directed by: Ira Skutch; Paul Alter (1969)
- Presented by: Joe Garagiola; Bill Cullen (fill-in)
- Announcer: Johnny Olson; Bill Wendell
- Country of origin: United States
- No. of episodes: 265

Production
- Producers: Howard Felsher; Ira Skutch
- Production locations: NBC Studios; New York, New York
- Running time: 30 minutes (with commercials)
- Production company: Mark Goodson-Bill Todman Productions

Original release
- Network: Syndicated (daily)
- Release: September 15, 1969 – August 21, 1970

Related
- Tattletales (1974-1978, 1982-1984)

He Said, She Said is an American game show hosted by Joe Garagiola, with Bill Cullen occasionally filling in when Garagiola was covering baseball games. The show, which asked couples questions about their personal lives, aired in syndication during the 1969–1970 season, and was taped at NBC Studios in New York City.

The show was produced by Goodson-Todman Productions for primary sponsor Holiday Inn (American Home Products, the makers of over-the-counter drugs such as Dristan and Anacin, also sponsored). Johnny Olson and Bill Wendell announced.

The show had two formats during its run; one in which four celebrity couples (one or both of the members being a celebrity) competed, and one which had a single celebrity couple and three civilian couples.

The format was modified and brought back on CBS in 1974 as Tattletales, with Bert Convy as host.

== Game play ==
Each team was given 100 points to begin the game (later they began with nothing). One member of each team (the men for the first half of the show, the women during the second half) were asked the questions, while the other member was taken to an off-stage room. Each could be seen and heard via a fake monitor that sat before each player using an electronic chroma key process; Garagiola communicated with them via an on-stage speaker phone.

Garagiola read a statement (e.g., "How he shows affection"), and each contestant would have to raise his hand. The first three to raise their hands would say a one- or two-word answer, which Garagiola would ask them to explain. The answers would then be read one at a time over the phone, and the off-stage partner would have to ring in if she thought her partner had said it. If the first person to ring in was correct, the couple won 25 points. If she was wrong, the couple lost 10 points, as did the team which originally gave the answer. Each of the three answers would be read in random order.

Typical contestant podia, with celebrities (left to right) Dick Clark, film producer Bob Zampino (then-husband of actress E. J. Peaker), Hal Holbrook, and Bert Convy, who would later host Tattletales.

During the all-celebrity format, the off-stage partner would have to not only ring in for the correct answer, but also relate the same explanation or story about the answer as the on-stage partner to get the points; otherwise they lost 10 points.

Each game consisted of four questions with the men and women switching positions halfway through the game. For the last question, only two people were allowed to raise their hands to answer.

At the end of the game, the team(s) with the most points won $250 and a full week's stay at any Holiday Inn. The remaining couples would each win a $100 gift certificate redeemable at any Holiday Inn. The celebrity couple played for a designated couple in the audience which was revealed at the end of the show. In the all-celebrity format, each celebrity couple played for a different couple in the audience.

== Pilots ==
=== 1966 ===
The original pilot, taped on November 7, 1966, titled It Had to Be You (not to be confused with the song by Frank Sinatra of the same name), was originally produced for NBC with Ed McMahon as host and had all-civilian couples; it also had a mixture of both genders instead of the same. This pilot was seen on YouTube on its channel The W/O/C Archive on April 26, 2021. Six months later, another pilot aired on Buzzr as part of their 6th Annual Lost & Found marathon on September 25, 2021.

=== 1969 ===
Among the episodes aired by GSN is the pilot for the 1969 series. The format features only one celebrity couple (Gene Rayburn and his wife Helen) playing against three civilian couples. The pilot exists as a black-and-white kinescope, although virtually all American television production had fully converted to color by this point.

=== 1971 ===
The 1971 pilot of the same name used a similar format. Round 1 was the same as what made it to air, only using dollars instead of points and buzzers instead of raising their hands. The remaining teams were given $400, $200, and $100 depending on where they finished.

In Round 2, three questions were asked to each couple in the same manner as Tattletales – $50 each if all three matched, $100 if two matched, and $150 if only one matched.

The two highest scorers moved on to Round 3, in which each member of the team was out on stage. Each of the four players got half the bank to bid on a question. Host Garagiola presented a question to one member of each team of the same gender. They wrote their answer on a card and then their partner gave a bid and an answer. If they were correct, they won their bid; if wrong, they lost it. The two players switched roles and repeated the process.

The top scorer played the Big Match, a single question where each player wrote their answer on a card. If they matched, they drew from a hopper of balls with dollar amounts from $250 to $1,500 in $250 increments with two of each amount, for a possible total of $3,000.

== Proposal ==
The show was planned to be revived in Syndication for the Fall 2016 season, but no distribution plans were made.

== About Last Night ==
On March 12, 2021, the streaming service HBO Max announced that it had ordered a reboot of the show which will be produced by Ayesha and Stephen Curry and like He Said, She Said and Tattletales before it will feature celebrity couples playing for charity. Fremantle stated that this version would also feature physical challenges and viewer-submitted questions. On August 23, 2021; it was announced that the show would be retitled as About Last Night, with an initial premiere set for Fall 2021. However, on January 19, 2022 it was announced that it will premiere on February 10.

== Episode status ==
The show's status is unknown. Relatively few episodes of the series have been aired by GSN, mostly featuring more well-known guests (including Sally Field). This includes the pilot which has survived only as a black-and-white 16mm film that was originally videotaped in color.

On Valentine's Day 2016, Buzzr aired six episodes of the series as part of a marathon. The network also aired two episodes as part of the "Buzzr's 3rd Annual Lost and Found" on September 30, 2018.
