= Make the Connection =

American TV quiz series (1955)

- Created by: Mark Goodson; Bill Todman
- Presented by: Jim McKay; Gene Rayburn
- Country of origin: United States
- No. of episodes: 13

Production
- Running time: 30 Minutes

Original release
- Network: NBC
- Release: July 7 – September 29, 1955

Make the Connection is an American game show, sponsored by Borden, that ran on Thursday nights from July 7 to September 29, 1955, on NBC from 8:30 to 9 p.m. Eastern Time.

Original host Jim McKay was replaced after the first four episodes by Gene Rayburn, who debuted as a game show host on August 4, 1955.

The series was a Mark Goodson-Bill Todman Production, and as such it had many things in common with the other panel shows developed by the company. Like What's My Line? and I've Got a Secret, there were four celebrity panelists who were each given a timed period in which to ask questions. Each panelist that was stumped earned the contestants money.

Betty White made one of her earliest game show appearances as a panelist on the series (her first on national television was a few weeks earlier on What's My Line?). The regular panelists were White, Gene Klavan, Gloria DeHaven, and Eddie Bracken.

== Rules ==
The object of the game was for the four celebrity panelists to guess what the connection was between two or more people. Each time a panelist failed to make the connection within 30 seconds, the contestant earned $25. The game ended after a panelist guessed the connection or the guest earned $150.

It also featured celebrity guests as panelists.

== Episode status ==
Only a handful of the thirteen episodes exist, including at least one McKay episode and a Rayburn-hosted edition which featured an overly animated J. Fred Muggs, the Today Show chimpanzee sidekick. GSN has occasionally shown an episode (mostly those hosted by Rayburn) in its "black and white" programming blocks. On September 11, 2017, Buzzr aired a Gene Rayburn episode as part of its "Lost and Found" event. Another Rayburn episode, specifically the one featuring Muggs, aired on September 25, 2021, as part of the network's 6th annual "Lost and Found" marathon. Two episodes with Rayburn as host and Betty White as a panelist aired as part of that network's tribute to White on what would have been her 100th birthday (January 17, 2022); one featured Buster Keaton, who gave a pie-throwing demonstration, and the other had golfer Sam Snead, who played the trumpet, and Gisele MacKenzie, who sang her current hit "Hard to Get". At the end of the latter. White noted that she already had three dogs but was willing to take a Cocker Spaniel that had gone unawarded. Buzzr aired an episode on Christmas morning as part of their "A Betty White Christmas" marathon.
