= Time for Love (radio program) =

1953-1954 old-time radio adventure drama

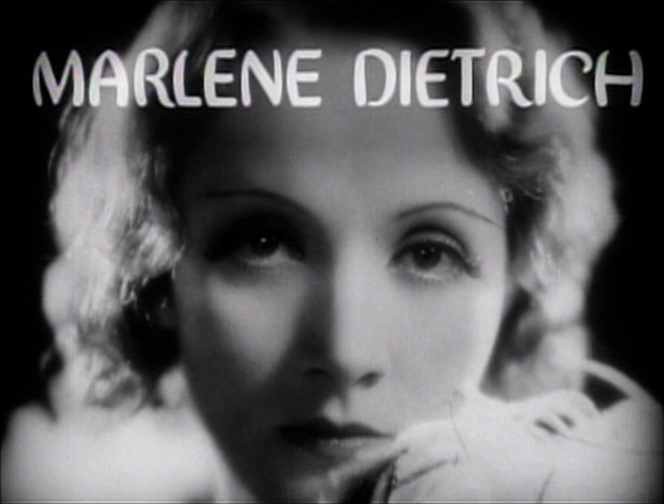
- Marlene Dietrich
- Country of origin: United States
- Language(s): English
- Syndicates: CBS
- Starring: Marlene Dietrich; Robert Readick
- Announcer: Lee Vines
- Directed by: Murray Burnett; Ernest Ricca
- Produced by: Marlene Dietrich
- Original release: January 15, 1953 – May 27, 1954
- Opening theme: Time for Love
- Sponsored by: Jergens hand cream

Time for Love is an old-time radio adventure drama in the United States. It was broadcast on CBS January 15, 1953 - May 27, 1954.

== Relationship to Cafe Istanbul ==
Time for Love can be considered a sequel to — or a spinoff of — Cafe Istanbul, although the setting and the main character's name differed from those of the earlier program. Radio historian John Dunning, in his reference book On the Air: The Encyclopedia of Old-Time Radio, wrote, "In 1953, Dietrich took the show [Cafe Istanbul] to CBS, changed the setting, and emerged with a sound-alike series called Time for Love. Robert C. Reinehr and Jon D. Swartz wrote in The A to Z of Old Time Radio, "The program [Cafe Istanbul] moved to a different network and was renamed Time for Love. Jim Cox, in Radio Crime Fighters: More Than 300 Programs from the Golden Age, noted, "Some reviewers suggested that this drama [Time for Love] was an outgrowth of Marlene Dietrich's previous radio adventure feature, Cafe Istanbul.

== Format ==
Cox described the main character, Dianne La Volte, as "a mythical, globally famous vocal performer ... [who] crusaded avocationally for law and order across the continents. She worked to protect innocent people and bring criminals to justice. Although La Volte lived in San Francisco, episodes of the program took her to Rome, Venice, Casablanca, Singapore, Vienna, and other far-flung places.

In the book Dietrich Icon, Gerd Gemünden and Mary R. Desjardins described a typical episode in which "La Volta confronts German gunrunners while on safari in Kenya during the Mau-Mau uprising. Her globe-trotting journalist-boyfriend Michael saves her from a lion while telling her that she is the most dangerous animal in the jungle."

== Personnel ==
Marlene Dietrich starred as Dianne La Volte. The only other character who appeared regularly was Michael Victor, an American journalist, who was portrayed by Robert Readick. Victor was La Volte's love interest, and he also "had the uncanny ability, with law authorities in tow, to arrive just in the nick of time to rescue La Volte from some menacing fate." Lee Vines was the announcer. Joe DeSantis, Guy Repp, and Luis Van Rooten were often heard in supporting roles.

Dietrich was the program's producer. Murray Burnett and Ernest Ricca were the directors. The program's theme was the song Time for Love, which Dietrich recorded with Percy Faith and his orchestra in 1953.
