= Dr. Standish, Medical Examiner =

American radio mystery series (1948)

Dr. Standish, Medical Examiner is an American radio mystery series that was broadcast on CBS From July 1, 1948, until August 19, 1948. It was a sustaining summer replacement program for The FBI in Peace and War, broadcast on Thursdays from 8 to 8:30 p.m. Eastern Time. The title character, created by George Harmon Coxe, had appeared in mystery stories in national magazines.

== Premise ==
By using his medical knowledge, Standish worked with police on difficult criminal cases. As he conducted autopsies, he examined crime victims' corpses to find clues that might help police solve "murders that had absolutely stumped them". His female assistant was "both nurse and Watson to Dr. Standish." Their relationship was strictly professional, but the program implied that she hoped for more — at least to the extent that Standish might call her by her first name. She had "a hefty heart for the doc," but he "seemed too busy with cops and cadavers to pay her the attention which was her due."

Episodes included "The Surprized Corpse" on July 8, 1948.

== Personnel ==
=== Cast ===
- Dr. Paul Standish - Gary Merrill
- Mary Benson (Standish's assistant) - Audrey Christie
- Lieutenant Ballard - Eric Dressler

=== Others ===
- Announcer - Lee Vines
- Director - Albert Ward
- Writers - Coxe, Charles S. Monroe, Charles Gussman, and Felix Holt

== Critical response ==
A review in the trade publication Billboard called Dr. Standish, Medical Examiner "an improbable-type show" and said that the result of the adaptation of the Standish character from print to radio "is open to considerable question." The review complimented Christie's portrayal of Benson but described the direction as "routine". It ended by saying that the reviewed episode would have been better if it had been condensed "to 15 minutes, which would have made a satisfactory soap opera episode ... But for a night-time dramatic opus, Dr. Standish needs a shot of plasma."

The trade publication Variety said that the premiere episode was "breezily written and airily played by a good cast". The review said that although the series "is no gem of originality", the episode contained "an average amount of suspense", and "its production and general makeup should afford it a fair share of attention from mystery fans."
