= What's Going On (game show) =

- Genre: Game show
- Created by: Allan Sherman
- Presented by: Lee Bowman
- Country of origin: United States
- Original language: English
- No. of seasons: 1
- No. of episodes: 5

Production
- Producers: Mark Goodson; Bill Todman
- Camera setup: Multi-camera
- Running time: 25 mins.
- Production company: Mark Goodson-Bill Todman Productions

Original release
- Network: ABC
- Release: November 28 – December 26, 1954

What's Going On is an American game show that aired for five weeks beginning on November 28, 1954, and ending on December 26, 1954. The show aired on ABC and was a Mark Goodson-Bill Todman production. It was sponsored by Revlon, and originated live from New York City.

Lee Bowman served as host of the show. There were six celebrities involved in the game: Hy Gardner, Audrey Meadows, Gene Raymond, Kitty Carlisle, Cliff Norton, and Susan Oakland. Jayne Meadows was a substitute panelist when her sister Audrey was doing a stage play.

== Format ==
Each week, three of the celebrities would be sent to either record film of an activity or to participate in a live remote broadcast documenting or doing an activity. Examples include washing windows at the Empire State Building, eating dinner at a Chinese restaurant, or destroying money no longer suitable for circulation at the Chicago Federal Reserve Bank. The remaining three celebrities would form the panel which would attempt to guess the activity. Each round, one activity would be introduced to the audience with part of the film or live remote, which would be shown behind the panel (they could only see it if they turned around). The activity was silently displayed (usually via written cards they would hold up in the film or remote) for the audience.

The panel would then take turns asking questions to determine the activity, limited by timer in a manner similar to I've Got a Secret. Depending on the presumed difficulty in guessing the activity, the panel could be given anywhere from three to ten "chimes" (guessing turns) between them, which would be revealed in advance. In some of the segments, an audience member would be recruited to engage in the activity with a panelist. In those cases, a relative of the audience member joined the panel attempting to guess the activity. Correctly guessing the activity resulted in a $100 prize. In the segments played exclusively by the panelists, there were no prizes.

== Episode status ==
The first four episodes are known to be intact, and were aired by GSN in 2005 as part of its late-night Black & White Overnight programming block. One of the four episodes was rerun on August 28, 2006, and April 30, 2007. The fifth and final episode's status is unknown.

One episode was aired on September 27, 2020, as part of Buzzr's 5th annual Lost and Found marathon.
