= The Movie Masters =

- Created by: Alan Goodman; Albie Hecht
- Presented by: Gene Rayburn
- Narrated by: Peter Pratt
- Country of origin: United States
- No. of seasons: 1

Production
- Executive producers: Fred Seibert; Alan Goodman; Albie Hecht
- Running time: 30 minutes
- Production company: Chauncey Street Productions

Original release
- Network: AMC
- Release: August 2, 1989 – January 19, 1990

The Movie Masters is an American television panel game show that ran from August 2, 1989, to January 19, 1990. It was the last game show hosted by Gene Rayburn and aired on the American Movie Classics (AMC) cable network.

The regular panel of the show consisted of veteran New York Times movie and theatre critic Clive Barnes and longtime To Tell the Truth panelists Kitty Carlisle and Peggy Cass.

== Game play ==
At the start of each episode, the announcer would introduce Cass, who in turn introduced Barnes, on through to Carlisle and Rayburn, the last of whom was escorted out by the hostess.

The goal of the game was to identify a famous movie scene hidden behind a 3-by-3 puzzle board. Each puzzle piece included a movie-related question, identified by a category; the question often involved "fill-in-the-blank" movie quotes similar to Rayburn's previous game show Match Game. Correctly answering a question revealed that piece of the puzzle; two incorrect answers in a category eliminated that piece from being chosen again and kept it permanently hidden (as the show only prepared two questions for each category). Winning the game earned a prize package for a home viewer, the size of which depended on how many questions the winning panelist had answered correctly.

Each panelist was addressed in sequence in lieu of a buzzer system; the panelist would be given the opportunity to answer each question before either of the other panelists were called upon.

== Production ==
The Movie Masters was one of American Movie Classics’ first jump into the pool of original series production. Chauncey Street Productions parent Fred/Alan, Inc. had worked with Josh Sapan for several years at Showtime before he oversaw American Movie Classics at Rainbow Media. Based on their past work together, he thought Chauncey Street might have some thoughts for an AMC series.

Chauncey Street majordomo Albie Hecht loved game shows (CSP went on to produce Turn It Up! for MTV, Kids' Court and GUTS for Nickelodeon, and Albie oversaw many more as president of Nickelodeon production). He and Fred/Alan principal Alan Goodman developed the idea for The Movie Masters, with the notion that it would recreate the salad days of broadcast network quiz shows. There were dozens of casting calls where the production spoke to luminaries like Betty Comden and Margaret Whiting, before coming to the conclusion they would replicate a classic quiz show lineup. They landed on Match Game’s Gene Rayburn as host, and actress and veteran quiz panelist Peggy Cass, New York Times theater critic Clive Barnes, and A Night at the Opera actress and To Tell the Truth stalwart Kitty Carlisle as panelists.

== Sources ==
- Brian Donlon, Vintage movies woo a bored audience, August 1, 1989, USA Today
- THERE'S SOMETHING FUNNY ABOUT CABLE'S PLANS FOR FALL, July 18, 1989, Buffalo News
