= Gene Klavan =

American radio host and author

Eugene Kantor Klavan (May 4, 1924 – April 8, 2004) was an American disc-jockey, columnist and author.

== Early years ==
Klavan was born in Baltimore, Maryland and attended Baltimore City College (high school). His radio career began with brief stints at Baltimore's WITH and WCBM, followed by WTOP in Washington, D.C., where he would remain until moving to WNEW New York in 1952. While in Washington, DC, Klavan also hosted, for a short time, a local television show which featured him doing silly things on camera while he played recorded music.

== 1130 WNEW New York ==
Klavan is most known for his time as half of the morning program "Klavan and Finch." The program ran from 1952 to 1968 on WNEW 1130; prior to 1952, Dee Finch had co-hosted the show with Gene Rayburn. Co-host Finch departed and Klavan continued solo until 1977. He wrote a biography in 1964, We Die at Dawn, that largely focused on the morning show. He followed it up in 1972 with Turn That Damned Thing Off, a book about the news media industry. In 1977 he moved from WNEW to 710 WOR and left radio in 1980. He later became a commentator at WCBS-TV, a host for American Movie Classics, and a columnist for Newsday.

== Personal life and death ==
Klavan and his wife Phyllis had 4 sons, including Andrew Klavan and Laurence Klavan, who are best-selling authors and screenwriters. On April 8, 2004, Klavan died due to complications of multiple myeloma at the age of 79.
