= Winner Take All (game show) =

- Created by: Mark Goodson; Bill Todman
- Presented by: Ward Wilson; Bill Cullen; Bud Collyer; Barry Gray; Sonny Fox
- Announcer: Bill Cullen; Bern Bennett; Harry Kramer; Don Pardo
- Country of origin: United States
- No. of episodes: 1951 (TV): ~50; 1952 (pre-Matinee): ~45; 1952 (Matinee): ~65

Original release
- Network: CBS (Radio; 1946–1952); CBS (Television; 1948–1951); NBC (1952)
- Release: June 3, 1946 – September 5, 1952

Winner Take All is an American radio-television game show that ran from June 3, 1946, to 1952 on CBS and NBC. It was the first game show produced by the Mark Goodson-Bill Todman partnership. The series was originally hosted by Ward Wilson, but is best known for being the first game hosted by Bill Cullen.

The origins were devised in 1942, but CBS rejected it, and finally accepted it in 1946 after the breakout of World War II.

Contestants were selected from the audience to compete for prizes. Although the game format was very simple, Winner Take All served as the genesis for many future game-show formats. It was the first game to use lockout devices, and the first to use returning champions.

The program was broadcast at 3 p.m. Eastern Time.

In July 1952, CBS launched a Saturday night version of the show, in addition to the regular Monday-Friday daytime broadcasts.

== Critical response ==
A review in the trade publication Billboard described the July 1, 1948, televised version of the program as being "loud as radio and twice as lurid". The review pointed out the "banality" of MC Bud Collyer's performance but added that little could be criticized about the technical aspects of the episode.
