= Play Your Hunch =

American television game show (1958–1963)

- Created by: Mark Goodson and Bill Todman
- Directed by: Mike Gargiulo
- Presented by: Merv Griffin; Gene Rayburn; Robert Q. Lewis
- Announcer: Johnny Olson; Wayne Howell (substitute); Roger Tuttle (substitute)
- Country of origin: United States
- No. of episodes: 1370

Production
- Producer: Ira Skutch
- Running time: 30 Minutes

Original release
- Network: CBS
- Release: June 30, 1958 – January 2, 1959
- Network: ABC
- Release: January 5 – May 8, 1959
- Network: NBC
- Release: December 7, 1959 – September 27, 1963

Play Your Hunch is an American game show first hosted by Merv Griffin from 1958 to 1962 and then hosted by Gene Rayburn and finally by Robert Q. Lewis until 1963. The announcers for the show were, respectively, Johnny Olson, Wayne Howell and Roger Tuttle. In 2001, Play Your Hunch was ranked #43 on TV Guide's "50 Greatest Game Shows of All Time".

Play Your Hunch was a Mark Goodson–Bill Todman production. It featured one of Robert Redford's first professional acting roles, with Ted Koppel also making an early career appearance.

== Broadcast history ==
The show first aired on CBS from 1958 to 1959. ABC began carrying it on January 5, 1959, and then NBC aired it for the rest of its run, concluding in 1963. During the NBC run, two different prime time versions aired - one in 1960, and one in 1962.

== Hosts and announcers ==
The series was originally hosted by Merv Griffin. He left on September 28, 1962, to begin his talk show. Gene Rayburn briefly took over from October 15 to November 16, 1962, before being reassigned to The Match Game. Robert Q. Lewis then took over for the rest of the run.

Announcer Johnny Olson substituted for Griffin on December 29, 1961 and March 6, 1962. This was Olson's first regular announcing job with longtime employer Mark Goodson.

== Game play ==
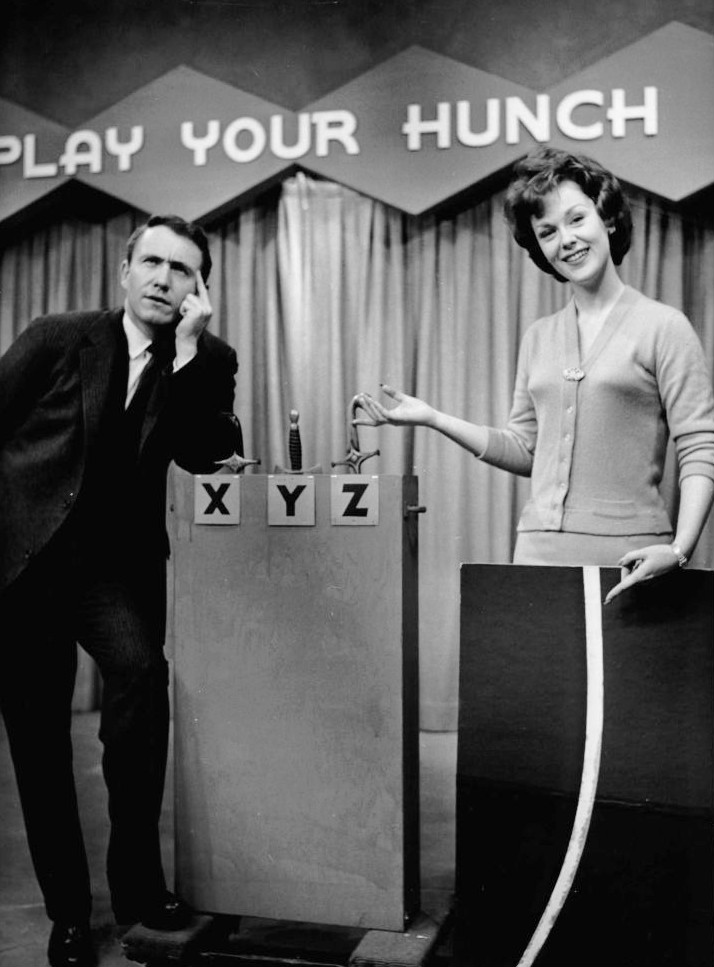
Merv Griffin and Liz Gardner in 1960.

Two couples (or occasionally pairs with other relationships) competed. The game revolved around "problems" which involved a choice between three visible possibilities (often three people) which were always labeled X, Y, and Z. Some questions would have an element of observation; for example, one couple was asked which of three labeled musicians amongst the show's band was not playing his instrument and was merely pretending. Other problems depended mainly on luck in guessing correctly.

The teams were alternatively presented with problems and had the choice to play or pass after the choices were unveiled but before the problem was described. The couple who played the problem discussed the answer amongst themselves until a chime rang and the couple had to answer. If the couple was wrong, the opponents had the choice between the remaining two answers. If either couple got the right answer, they earned a point, with three points winning the game. In addition, each team earned $50 a point ($100 a point on NBC's primetime edition). At least once every show, the couples would also have to solve a "come-closer" problem, which involved coming up with a numerical answer to a problem by writing their answer on a slate (example: how many coffee beans in a displayed container); the teams would then reveal their slates, and the team who guessed closer to the actual answer would score a point.

Couples remained on the show as champions until they were defeated, with the first question of each game going to the challengers.

On the CBS version, the winning couple played an endgame known as "The Last Straw" for a car. The couple would be shown 7 straws, without knowing which 5 were long and which 2 were short. If the couple picked all 5 long straws, they won a car. If they picked a short straw, they earned $100 for each long straw they picked up to that point. A later bonus round would be played for a prize, like a trip, an appliance, a car, etc. Either the show's assistant Liz Gardner, or announcer Johnny Olson himself would hide behind one of three "doors" onstage; the couple would simply have to guess which "door" either of them was hiding behind. No bonus games were played on the NBC run.

== Foreign versions ==
A British version of the show was produced by the BBC in the early 1960s, hosted at one stage by Alan Freeman. An Australian version aired on QTQ Channel 9 in Brisbane from 1968 to 1973 hosted by Don Secombe. A different Australian version aired 1962–1964 on TCN-9 in Sydney, hosted by George Foster.

== Episode status ==
Some episodes exist. GSN aired a handful of episodes with Griffin as host. One public domain episode of the Griffin version is available on classic game show DVD collections. The year is unknown.

== Critical response ==
A review in the trade publication Variety called Griffin "an affable emcee" and complimented his maintaining continuity despite the number of commercials. Overall the review summarized the show as "typical daytime audience participation fare that some housewives find entertaining."
