= Choose Up Sides =

1956 children's television series

- Genre: Game show
- Presented by: Gene Rayburn
- Narrated by: Don Pardo
- Country of origin: United States
- No. of episodes: 13

Production
- Running time: 30 minutes
- Production company: Goodson-Todman Productions

Original release
- Network: NBC
- Release: January 7 – March 31, 1956

Choose Up Sides is a children's television game show that aired on NBC from January 7 to March 31, 1956. It was hosted by Gene Rayburn, announced by Don Pardo and produced by Goodson-Todman Productions.

== Background ==
Choose Up Sides began as a local program in New York in 1953. Dean Miller was the host. NBC decided to try the program in 1956 "to capture the fancy of the children who are home from school on Saturday".

== Format ==
The show had two teams of children compete for points with the winning team earning a prize. Each side was represented by four children, usually three boys and one girl. The boys competed against each other and the girls competed against each other.

The teams were named "Space Pilots" and "Bronco Busters". Each team had an adult assistant (Roger Peterson and Tommy Tompkins, respectively) who dressed as a space commander or cowboy, respectively. The assistants introduced each contestant to Rayburn. Each player selected a postcard from a pool that had been sent in by children from all over the country. The team that won also won a prize for the child whose postcard they had drawn.

The children competed against each other doing stunts. The stunts were the type one might have seen on Beat the Clock (another Goodson-Todman Production). The winning team for each stunt scored 100 points. The losing team was allowed to do something else to earn 25 or 50 points. Their consolation stunt was dictated to them by a character called "Mr. Mischief", a wall-puppet that was operated and voiced by Pardo. The time limit for the stunt was a whistle that could go off at any time. This was later changed to a balloon in Mr. Mischief's mouth which would inflate until it burst. When it was time for the losing team's child to go meet Mr. Mischief, Gene accompanied the child while doing a "silly walk" - perhaps a precursor to the Monty Python Silly Walk episode.

At some point in the show was a contest called the Super Duper Doo stunt. Each week a child was chosen to compete in an additional stunt for the possibility of winning a grand prize at the end of a four-week period by getting the most items. The first stunt involved tossing 15 playing cards at a ball covered with sticky tape that was suspended from the ceiling, while standing in a box (the prize promised was a boat rig). The second stunt involved blowing 10 sheets of paper off a podium, trying to get them to land in a wastebasket that was set in front of them (the prize promised was a television set). It is unknown what the third stunt involved.

If there was extra time at the end of the show, there would be team stunts to allow a team to catch up on points.

The four children on the winning team won grand prizes of bicycles for the studio contestants and cameras for the home partners. The other team received a sportsmanship award of ice skates for both the studio contestants and home partners.

== Pilot ==
On April 23, 2005 and November 27, 2007, GSN aired the 1953 pilot produced for CBS with Bob Kennedy as host. The teams were called the "Space Rangers" and the "Cowboys", with each team having a large bleacher of children on its side.

A child from each team competed in stunts, and then gained points on a ring-toss board with each peg marked with a number of points. The child who won the stunt would throw two rings for their team and the child who lost would throw one. The show had three "magic numbers" each show, which if the team's point total match would win them 10 extra points, and a special prize for the child who tossed the ring. The process repeated with different children from each team until the show ran out of time.

All children on both teams received a "sportsmanship prize", such as a camera, and the members of the winning team, along with several home viewers chosen from a pool of write-ins, won a grand prize, such as a watch.

== Stunts ==
The stunts used throughout the run were devised by Bob Howard and Frank Wayne; the same two men also did the stunts for Beat the Clock, which was still on the air at the time.

== Episode status ==
The series may or may not be destroyed; this is uncertain because, although Goodson-Todman usually kept its shows, NBC would usually destroy anything it didn't think was worth keeping. Children's shows were no exception, unless companies dictated otherwise.

GSN aired the pilot and the first five episodes in the past. On September 11, 2017, Buzzr aired the first episode as part of their "Lost and Found" event. It eventually aired the pilot, on January 16, 2023.

== Production ==
Lloyd Gross was the director, and Frank Wayne and Bob Howard were the writers. Choose Up Sides initially was broadcast on Saturdays from noon to 12:30 p.m. Eastern Time. From March 3, 1956, until it ended it was seen from 12:30 to 1 p.m. E. T. Its competition included Big Top on CBS. NBC canceled the program at the end of March 1956 after it was unable to attract a sponsor. The time slot reverted to local stations.
