= Dog Tales =

American documentary television series

Dog Tales is a weekly half-hour syndicated documentary television series. Produced intermittently from 2007 to 2016, it featured stories and news about all types of dogs and dog lovers. It was produced by Alex Paen, and distributed by Storrs Media/Telco Productions, Inc.
