= Buzzr =

American digital multicast television network

- Type: Digital broadcast television network (classic game shows)
- Country: United States

Programming
- Language: English
- Picture format: 1080i (HDTV); 480i (SDTV)

Ownership
- Owner: RTL Group
- Parent: Fremantle

History
- Founded: January 20, 2015; 11 years ago
- Launched: June 1, 2015; 11 years ago
- Founder: Thom Beers

Links
- Webcast: Watch live
- Website: www.buzzrtv.com

Availability

Terrestrial
- See list of affiliates

Streaming media
- Service(s): Google TV, LG Channels, Philo, Pluto TV, Prime Video Live TV, Samsung TV Plus, Sling Freestream, Stirr, The Roku Channel, Tubi, Vizio Watch Free+, Xumo

Buzzr (stylized as BUZZR) is an American digital broadcast television network owned by Fremantle North America, a unit of the Fremantle subsidiary of RTL Group. The network serves as an outlet for the extensive library of classic game shows owned by Fremantle. Buzzr marks Fremantle's entry into North American television broadcasting; parent company RTL currently operates numerous TV channels in Europe.

Buzzr's digital subchannel is seen in 62 U.S. television markets, cable television and is available as a channel on streaming services Pluto TV, Stirr, Amazon Freevee (formerly IMDB TV), and Sling TV. The network is also available nationwide on free-to-air C-band satellite via Galaxy 19 in the DVB-S2 format.

The brand is named after the game show buzzer, which contestants use on certain game shows to signal their readiness to give an answer.

== History ==
The Buzzr brand was first used by Fremantle for a YouTube channel created and produced by its digital content studio Tiny Riot, which debuted in late 2014. The Buzzr YouTube channel features classic clips, and short-form adaptations of its game show properties (such as Family Feud and Password), with internet celebrities as contestants, primarily aimed towards millennials.

On January 20, 2015, FremantleMedia (as it was known then) announced that it would launch Buzzr, a digital multicast network that would serve as an extension of the brand; the network, with the Fox Television Stations as its charter station group. Buzzr features classic game shows from the company's programming library. Thom Beers, former CEO of FremantleMedia North America, stated his interest in launching a network centered on its game show content after he joined the company in 2012, calling such a project a "top priority" for Fremantle as a way to help monetize the value of its library. The company intended to focus Buzzr toward older adults, with Beers citing that the "old-format game shows are really, really hard [for the younger viewership that the Buzzr YouTube channel targets] to watch."

The Buzzr television network debuted on June 1, 2015, with the launch preceded by a preview reel outlining its initial programming that aired in an eight-hour continuous loop, starting at 12:00 p.m. Eastern Time Zone. The network formally launched that evening at 8:00 p.m. Eastern Time with the 1963 pilot episode of Let's Make a Deal as the first show to be broadcast.

In 2016, to celebrate the upcoming 75th year of the genre, the network created a story arc of the game show with new episodes of favorable classics, along with additional promotions and special marathons all year long. Additionally, that fall, FremantleMedia began leasing select episodes of Card Sharks with Bill Rafferty and Family Feud with Louie Anderson for weekend airings on their affiliates' main channels, though this practice ended after a single season.

In October 2016, FremantleMedia and Canadian video game company Ludia teamed up to create a slot machine app based on Buzzr's programming. The name of the app is called the "Buzzr Casino" based on their former prime-time programming block.

On March 27, 2017, Buzzr began airing paid and religious programming from 6:00 a.m. to 8:00 a.m. on weekdays, and from 6:00 a.m. to 10:00 a.m. on weekends. On January 1, 2018, paid and religious programming was also added to the 5:00 a.m. hour for both weekdays and weekends. However, Buzzr went back to airing game shows in the 5:00 a.m. hour on June 26, 2018.

In June 2018, Buzzr launched a live stream hosted on their website, which mirrors the network broadcast.

On November 15, 2021, Buzzr began airing and promoting The Newlywed Game for over the air and cable broadcast only; this was possibly due to licensing issues with Sony Pictures Television, the owners of The Newlywed Game and the rest of the Chuck Barris library, that prohibited Buzzr from streaming it. The online stream instead broadcast Family Feud with Richard Dawson in its place. This arrangement continued until January 9, 2022, when The Newlywed Game was finally made available for all Buzzr viewers over the air, cable, and streaming.

On January 24, 2022, Mark Deetjen, executive producer of global channels at Fremantle and the general manager of Buzzr, died at the age of 50.

== Programming ==
Fremantle's library of game shows spanned 154 series and an estimated 40,000 episodes overall at the time of its launch, from which Buzzr draws its programming. The network's regular lineup – with series produced from the 1950s to 2000 – includes such programs as To Tell the Truth, Password, Family Feud (encompassing episodes beginning with Richard Dawson as host and dating up to John O'Hurley's tenure), What's My Line?, I've Got a Secret, Beat the Clock, Card Sharks, Body Language, Match Game (including, beginning in 2019, the Match Game-Hollywood Squares Hour, which, up until then, had never been shown in reruns) and the original 1950s & 1960s version of The Price Is Right hosted by Bill Cullen. Episodes from the Bob Barker era of The Price Is Right were made available in May 2024 after several years of negotiation, beginning with the season 13 premiere. In addition to the Mark Goodson-Bill Todman programs mentioned above, Buzzr's library includes Al Howard Productions (Supermarket Sweep), Bill Carruthers (Press Your Luck), Reg Grundy (Sale of the Century) and Stefan Hatos-Monty Hall (Let's Make a Deal, and Split Second, which would get revived by main competitor Game Show Network in April 2023) back catalogs. It occasionally licenses games from other sources, including a syndication deal with Burt Sugarman to carry Whew! beginning in September 2021.

As of 2018, almost all of Buzzr's lineup consists of game shows that originally had aired between 1973 and 1993 (Match Game, Password, Family Feud and Supermarket Sweep, in particular, air multiple episodes each day), with select blocks of 1950s and 1960s panel shows also being featured. Celebrity Name Game and Temptation are the only recent game shows the network has aired. More obscure programs occasionally air as special program blocks, including the anthology series Lost and Found, featuring rare episodes, unsold pilots, and forgotten shows. On October 20, 2017, Buzzr debuted its first original program Game Changers. This documentary reviewed the history of the game show genre and featured interviews with game show personalities such as Alex Trebek, Wink Martindale and Drew Carey.

Buzzr airs a half hour of educational children's programming (cut from three hours shortly after the FCC eliminated rules requiring digital subchannels to carry such programs in late 2019), leading out of its weekend morning infomercial blocks to minimize interruption; Science Nation and Dog Tales air one episode each week. The channel carries two hours of infomercials each morning, a block that includes the televangelism series Through the Bible with Les Feldick (some of the online simulcasts of Buzzr do not carry the infomercials or Through the Bible due to restrictions on paid programming on those platforms). Other than these, the only non-game show related programming on Buzzr thus far was between September 14, 2017, and October 6, 2017, when episodes of Richard Simmons Dream Maker briefly appeared on the schedule, and a marathon of The Great Christmas Light Fight in November 2018 and on November 28, 2019.

== Streaming ==
In 2017, Buzzr began streaming its programming to Amazon Prime Video and Twitch; the Prime Video offering provides video on demand, while Twitch offered a linear feed separate from the over-the-air telecast. The Twitch stream would be discontinued on April 22, 2019. Buzzr also provided some game show programming to Nosey, a site offering video-on-demand of daytime television in the United States reruns. The local Buzzr affiliate sub-channel is carried in some areas on the streaming services LocalBTV, Locast and iGoCast (the streaming platform of KCKS-LD) as well.

In 2018, as part of their third birthday celebration, Buzzr launched a livestream of the over-the-air telecast on their website. Later that year, Buzzr was added to Pluto TV.

In 2019, Stirr, a free over-the-top service launched by Sinclair Broadcast Group, included Buzzr among its offerings. In a preliminary assessment released July 2019, Stirr stated that Buzzr was the most-watched national channel on the service and the second-most-watched overall (second only to the combined viewership of its Stirr City local channels).

On March 18, 2020, Sling TV added Buzzr to their service and made available to all its subscribers.

=== Dedicated series streaming channels ===
On December 1, 2020, Buzzr launched a spin-off channel, The Price Is Right: The Barker Era, a 24/7 channel on Pluto TV that exclusively carries episodes of The Price Is Right from Bob Barker's hosting tenure. The episodes started with Season 11 in 1982, the first year where animal-based products (such as fur coats) were no longer offered on the show at Barker's request. In a statement on Buzzr's FAQ page, the company stated that this was the only way to distribute the reruns because of an exclusivity agreement with CBS (since renegotiated) that prohibited any network or outlet not owned by CBS or parent company Paramount (of which Pluto TV is a subsidiary) from airing episodes of The Price Is Right from 1972 onward, meaning Buzzr could not carry the show over-the-air at the time. However, Bill Cullen-era episodes of Price were exempt from this limitation, as those episodes originally aired on NBC/ABC, and thus were allowed to air on Buzzr. As of January 2023, episodes airing on The Price Is Right: The Barker Era range from September 13, 1982 (season 11) through October 11, 1985 (season 14, the last episode before Johnny Olson's death). On February 8, 2022, The Price Is Right: The Barker Era was added to The Roku Channel; on the same day, a dedicated spin-off channel devoted to Supermarket Sweep was launched on the same platform. On November 27, 2023, three months after Barker's death, 60 episodes from the first season (1972–73) of The Price Is Right, which hasn't been shown on TV in two decades, were added to the channel's rotation, with the episodes curated from those in which no fur coats were offered as prizes, or whose videotape prints are deemed satisfactory enough to air. 100 episodes from Rod Roddy's announcing run, including Barker unveiling his gray hair, were added in late September 2025, with these episodes remastered in high definition.

A second Pluto spin-off channel featuring Wayne Brady's era of Let's Make a Deal was launched in July 2022, with episodes from the Monty Hall era continuing to air on Buzzr.

To tie in with Buzzr's 8th anniversary as well as National Game Show Day, Buzzr launched two new spin-off channels on Pluto TV on June 1, 2023, with one dedicated to episodes of The Price Is Right from Drew Carey's era, beginning with Season 38 and another, entitled Family Feud Classic, showcasing episodes of Family Feud from the Richard Dawson and Ray Combs era.

They are also a part of the live stream section of the Amazon Freevee and The Roku Channel apps.

Streaming channels devoted to the current versions of To Tell the Truth and Press Your Luck were distributed via the online platforms of ABC, which carries the first-run episodes. These were eliminated with the closure of ABC's mobile and smart-television apps in September 2023. DirecTV Stream added Buzzr, the extra TPIR channels, and Let's Make a Deal to its lineup.

== Affiliates ==
As of February 2016, Buzzr has current subchannel affiliation agreements with television stations in 53 media markets encompassing 26 states and the District of Columbia, covering over 60% of media markets in the United States.

Fox Television Stations was announced as the network's initial affiliate group, airing Buzzr on 12 Fox owned-and-operated stations and five MyNetworkTV owned-and-operated stations. Buzzr has affiliates in all 10 of the largest and 15 of the 20 largest U.S. television markets (including New York City, Los Angeles, Chicago, Philadelphia, San Francisco, Boston-Manchester, New Hampshire and Dallas–Fort Worth, Texas), with an initial reach of 37% of U.S. television homes. In four of the network's launch markets (New York City, Los Angeles, Dallas–Fort Worth, and Phoenix, Arizona), Buzzr is affiliated with stations whose subchannels the network occupies were previously affiliated with Bounce TV; as a result of a March 2014 agreement with Univision Communications, Bounce TV moved its affiliations in those markets to Univision-owned stations in late May 2015, shortly before Buzzr launched.

Debmar-Mercury (which serves as the distribution partner for the current syndicated run of the Fremantle-produced Family Feud) was hired by Fremantle to handle responsibility for the recruitment of affiliates through agreements with other broadcasting companies. The network hopes to expand its charter affiliate footprint to reach markets covering 50 million U.S. households with at least one television set.

In September 2016, Yes TV, a small Canadian television system with stations in Ontario and Alberta, began airing a Buzzr-branded block programming of classic game shows called "Buzzr After Hours" overnight Tuesday to Saturday from 1 to 3:30 a.m. (formerly 1-4 a.m.) local time.

In May 2017, Dish Network began carrying Buzzr on channel 245.

List of current Buzzr affiliates
Media market	State/District	Station	Channel
Birmingham	Alabama	WUOA-LD	46.2
Huntsville	Alabama	W34EY-D	38.4
Montgomery	Alabama	WDSF-LD	19.2
Phoenix	Arizona	KUTP	45.3
Yuma	Arizona	KBFY-LD	41.6
Fayetteville	Arkansas	KAJL-LD	16.4
Bakersfield	California	KCBT-LD	34.8
Fresno	California	KVBC-LD	13.7
Los Angeles	California	KCOP-TV	13.2
Monterey	California	KMBY-LD	27.4
Sacramento	California	KBTV-CD	8.1
San Francisco–Oakland–San Jose	California	KTVU	2.4
San Diego	California	KSKT-CD	43.4
Santa Barbara	California	KVMM-CD	41.4
Yuba City	California	KKPM-CD	28.7
Denver	Colorado	KETD	53.5
Grand Junction	Colorado	KLML	20.12
Hartford–New Haven	Connecticut	WRNT-LD	32.6
Washington	District of Columbia	WTTG	5.2
Fort Myers	Florida	WRXY-TV	49.4
Gainesville	Florida	WNFT-LD	8.6
Jacksonville	Florida	WKBJ-LD	20.1
Miami	Florida	W16CC-D	16.1
Orlando	Florida	WOFL	35.2
Tampa–St. Petersburg	Florida	WTVT	13.3
West Palm Beach	Florida	WXOD-LD	24.1
Atlanta	Georgia	WAGA-TV	5.3
Augusta	Georgia	WIEF-LD	47.5
Macon	Georgia	W28EU-D	42.3
Boise	Idaho	KKJB	39.4
Twin Falls	Idaho	KYTL-LD	17.3
Champaign-Urbana	Illinois	WBXC-CD	18.4
Chicago	Illinois	WFLD	32.3
Marion	Illinois	WTCT	27.8
Evansville	Indiana	WEIN-LD	40.1
Fort Wayne	Indiana	WCUH-LD	16.3
Indianapolis	Indiana	WUDZ-LD	28.1
Cedar Falls	Iowa	KFKZ-LD	35.3
Des Moines	Iowa	KAJR-LD	36.5
Dodge City	Kansas	KDDC-LD	23.2
Garden City	Kansas	KGCE-LD	23.2
Kansas City	Kansas	KCKS-LD	25.1
Liberal	Kansas	KSWE-LD	23.2
Louisburg	Kansas	KMJC-LD	25.1
Sublette	Kansas	KDGL-LD	23.2
Ulysses	Kansas	KDGU-LD	23.2
Topeka	Kansas	WROB-LD	25.1
Wichita	Kansas	KAGW-CD	26.9
Bowling Green	Kentucky	WCZU-LD	39.2
Louisville	Kentucky	WBNA	21.10
Richmond	Kentucky	WBON-LD	9.1
Alexandria	Louisiana	K29NX-LD	29.1
Lafayette	Louisiana	KDCG-CD	22.3
Monroe	Louisiana	KMLU	11.7
New Orleans	Louisiana	WQDT-LD	33.1
Shreveport	Louisiana	KTSH-CD	19.4
Baltimore	Maryland	WQAW-LD	69.8
Salisbury	Maryland	WOWZ-LD	33.2
Boston	Massachusetts	WLVI	56.2
Detroit	Michigan	WJBK	2.3
Flint–Saginaw	Michigan	WFFC-LD	17.5
Lake City–Cadillac	Michigan	WMNN-LD	26.7
Duluth	Minnesota	KMYN-LD	32.6
Minneapolis–Saint Paul	Minnesota	KMSP-TV	9.4
Joplin	Missouri	KPJO-LD	49.4
Kansas City	Missouri	KMJC-LD	25.1
Kansas City	Missouri	KCKS-LD	25.1
Springfield	Missouri	KRFT-LD	8.9
St. Louis	Missouri	KBGU-LD	33.1
Kalispell	Montana	KMJD-LD	34.6
Lincoln	Nebraska	KAJS-LD	33.1
Las Vegas	Nevada	KGNG-LD	26.4
Reno	Nevada	KGLR-LD	35.9
Albuquerque	New Mexico	KRTN-LD	39.2
Albany–Schenectady–Troy	New York	WYBN-LD	14.1
Jamestown–Buffalo	New York	WNYB	26.6
New York City	New York	WWOR-TV	9.3
Syracuse	New York	WMJQ-CD	40.2
Asheville	North Carolina	WDKT-LD	31.7
Charlotte	North Carolina	WHEH-LD	41.4
Raleigh–Durham–Fayetteville	North Carolina	WNCB-LD	16.2
Cleveland	Ohio	WBNX-TV	55.2
Columbus	Ohio	WGCT-LD	39.2
Portsmouth	Ohio	WTZP-LD	50.3
Oklahoma City	Oklahoma	KBZC-LD	42.3
Tulsa	Oklahoma	KGEB	53.3
Portland	Oregon	KOXI-CD	20.3
Philadelphia	Pennsylvania	WTXF-TV	29.4
Pittsburgh	Pennsylvania	WOSC-CD	61.3
Scranton	Pennsylvania	WRLD-LD	30.2
State College–Johnstown	Pennsylvania	WHVL-LP	29.2
Knoxville	Tennessee	WEZK-LD	28.5
Memphis	Tennessee	KPMF-LD	26.4
Nashville	Tennessee	WCTZ-LD	35.1
Amarillo	Texas	KLKW-LD	22.4
Austin	Texas	KTBC	7.3
College Station	Texas	KZCZ-LD	34.5
Dallas–Fort Worth	Texas	KDFI	27.3
Houston	Texas	KTXH	20.4
Lubbock	Texas	KNKC-LD	29.7
San Antonio	Texas	KOBS-LD	19.2
Tyler	Texas	KPKN-LD	33.1
Ogden–Salt Lake City	Utah	KPNZ	24.5
Richmond	Virginia	WUDW-LD	53.1
Norfolk–Virginia Beach–Chesapeake	Virginia	WSKY-TV	4.4
Aberdeen	Washington	K25CG-D	13.4
Seattle–Tacoma	Washington	KCPQ	13.4
Spokane	Washington	KDYS-LD	32.4
Yakima	Washington	KYPK-LD	32.3
Clarksburg	West Virginia	W24ER-D	21.7
Moorefield	West Virginia	W24ES-D	5.2
La Crosse	Wisconsin	WZEO-LD	26.1
Madison	Wisconsin	W23BW-D	23.2
Milwaukee	Wisconsin	WTSJ-LD	38.2
Wausau	Wisconsin	WRJT-LD	34.6

== See also ==
- Game Show Network
- Nickelodeon Games and Sports
- GameTV
- Challenge (TV channel)
