= Password (disambiguation) =

A password is a word, phrase or string of characters used to gain access to a resource, such as an object, area or information.

Password may also refer to:

== Film ==
- Password (2019 Bangladeshi film), starring Shakib Khan
- Password (2019 Indian film), starring Dev
- Password (2019 Nepali film), starring Anoop Bikram Shahi

== Music ==
- Passwords (band), a Canadian rock band
- Password (record producer), Nigerian record producer
- Passwords (album), a 2018 album by American folk rock band Dawes
- Password, a 2000 album by Geoff Muldaur
- "Password", a song by DRAM from his 2016 album Big Baby DRAM
- "Password", a song by Kylie Minogue from her 2001 CD single Your Disco Needs You
- "Password", a 1964 song by Kitty Wells

== Television ==
- Password (American game show), an American television game show
- Password (British game show), a British panel game show based on the US version, 1963–1983

== Other uses ==
- Password (game), a home version of the television game show Password
- Password (video gaming), a video game saving method
- Passwords (2000), a book by French philosopher Jean Baudrillard, published in French as Mots de passe
- European Strategic Program on Research in Information Technology (ESPRIT), a project researching X.509 technology, called "Password"
- "The Password" is the nickname of Jhostynxon Garcia, a Venezuelan baseball player

== See also ==
- Password manager, software or hardware used to generate complex computer passwords
- The Password Game, an online puzzle game
- Code word (disambiguation)
