= Oscar Cargill =

Oscar Cargill (19 March 1898, Livermore Falls, Maine – 18 April 1972, Montclair, New Jersey) was a writer, editor, and professor of English.

He graduated in 1922 from Wesleyan University and became an English instructor at Marietta College and then Michigan State University. He enrolled as a graduate student at Columbia University, studied in 1927–1928 at Stanford University on a Cutting fellowship from Columbia, and received his doctorate from Columbia in 1930. Cargill became a professor at New York University, served for some years as the chair of the English department, and from 1948 to 1966 was the director of N.Y.U.'s American civilization program.

A consulting editor on English texts to the Macmillan Company, he also edited more than 35 titles for the Gotham Library series of the N.Y.U. Press. He edited works of Whitman, Thoreau, Henry James, Frank Norris and O'Neill. ... Dr. Cargill was a guiding force in building the English Department at N.Y.U. Distinguished scholars during his tenure included Gay Wilson Allen, Leon Edel, M. L. Rosenthal and David H. Greene.

Most of Cargill's publications dealt with the works of nineteenth- and twentieth-century American authors. Upon his death he was survived by his widow, two daughters, and six grandchildren.

== Selected publications ==
- Drama and liturgy. New York: Columbia University Press. 1930.
- as editor: Social revolt; American literature from 1888 to 1914. New York: Macmillan. 1933.
- Intellectual America; ideas on the march. New York: Macmillan. 1941.
  - América intelectual, ideas en marcha, versión castellana y notas de Julio E. Payro. Buenos Aires: Editoria Guillermo Kraft. 1948.
- as editor: Henry D. Thoreau: Selected writings on nature and liberty. New York: Liberal Arts Press. 1952.
- with Thomas Clark Pollock: Thomas Wolfe add Washington Square. New York University Press. 1954.
- as editor with Thomas Clark Pollock: The correspondence of Thomas Wolfe and Homer Andrew Watt. New York University Press. 1954.
- Novels of Henry James. New York: Macmillan. 1961.
- as editor with N. Bryllion Fagin and William J. Fisher: O'Neill and his plays, four decades of criticism. New York: New York University Press. 1961.
- Toward a pluralistic criticism. With a preface by Harry T. Moore. Carbondale: Southern Illinois University Press. 1965.
