= America Alive! =

U.S. daytime television talk show (1978–1979)

- Genre: talk show
- Created by: Woody Frazer
- Directed by: Don Roy King
- Presented by: Jack Linkletter; Caitlyn Jenner (Note: Credited as Bruce Jenner); Pat Mitchell; Janet Langhart
- Country of origin: United States
- Original language: English
- No. of seasons: 1

Production
- Producer: Ken Greengrass
- Production locations: 30 Rockefeller Plaza, New York City; NBC Studios, Burbank, California
- Camera setup: Multi-camera
- Running time: 60 minutes (including commercials)

Original release
- Network: NBC
- Release: July 24, 1978 – January 4, 1979

America Alive! is an American television talk-variety program created by Woody Fraser. The show had a brief run on NBC, which aired it as part of its weekday daytime programming schedule from July 24, 1978, until January 4, 1979.

== Overview ==
After helping to develop Good Morning America for ABC, producer Woody Fraser was recruited by then-NBC entertainment president Fred Silverman to create America Alive!. The show was developed to be an alternative for female viewers who wanted a reprieve from the standard daytime fare presented by the three broadcast networks and local stations—usually soap operas, game shows, lifestyle shows aimed at homemakers, and news programs. NBC made a hefty financial investment in the show, which contained live in-studio and satellite remote segments, and was produced in front of a live audience at NBC's New York City studios at 30 Rockefeller Plaza.

Jack Linkletter was the show's primary host, based in New York. Janet Langhart (hired away from her co-hosting position on Good Day! on WCVB-TV in Boston) and Caitlyn Jenner (two years removed from her gold medal-winning performance at the 1976 Summer Olympics) were added as co-hosts and presented remote segments, with Langhart reporting from various Eastern locations and Jenner from Los Angeles. The trio were joined by regular contributors including roving correspondent Pat Mitchell; newspaper columnist Sheilah Graham, who presented a celebrity gossip segment; Los Angeles entertainment critic David Sheehan; consumer reporter David Horowitz; and comedians Dick Orkin and Bert Berdis. A regular segment on women's health, featuring research from Masters and Johnson, was also included.

=== Scheduling ===
America Alive! aired live at 12 Noon Eastern/11:00 am Central (tape-delayed in the Mountain and Pacific time zones, where it was scheduled at 11:00 am), replacing Sanford and Son reruns and The Gong Show in NBC's daytime schedule. This placement caused problems as many NBC affiliates on the East Coast aired local newscasts at Noon, thus resulting in some stations pre-empting all or part of the program. NBC stations of note which did not carry America Alive! included WSB-TV in Atlanta; WBZ-TV in Boston; WCIV in Charleston, South Carolina; WTLV in Jacksonville; WAVE-TV in Louisville; WCKT in Miami; WSYR-TV in Syracuse, New York; WFLA-TV in Tampa; and WPTV in West Palm Beach. Additionally, three NBC affiliates in Ohio–WLWT in Cincinnati, WCMH-TV in Columbus, and WDTN in Dayton–declined to clear America Alive! and opted to continue with The Bob Braun Show, a long-running, regionally-distributed program which originated from Cincinnati. Other NBC affiliates, such as WBAL-TV in Baltimore; WIS-TV in Columbia, South Carolina; WSM-TV in Nashville; KYW-TV in Philadelphia; WAVY-TV in Portsmouth, Virginia; WJAR-TV in Providence, Rhode Island; and KSD-TV in St. Louis, aired only a half-hour of the show.

Several months into the program's run, in November 1978, Jack Linkletter discussed the high cost of producing America Alive! because of the travel budget necessary for its roving reporters, and discussed the ratings, which were "bordering on dismal". The show particularly had trouble against two popular soap operas on CBS, The Young and the Restless and Search for Tomorrow, along with the added competition from ABC's The $20,000 Pyramid and Ryan's Hope, all of which were more successful than the NBC offering. Critical reception to the program was mostly skewed towards the negative end of the spectrum.

=== Cancellation ===
The combination of poor reviews and pre-emptions doomed America Alive! perhaps from the start, as the program suffered from anemic ratings from the outset. After a last-ditch effort to revamp the show with the addition of a weekly celebrity co-host (a device used by other variety talk shows of the era, such as The Mike Douglas Show, The Merv Griffin Show and Dinah!) failed, NBC made the decision in December 1978 to cancel America Alive!; the program aired its final episode on January 4, 1979, with a scheduled NBC News special featuring Betty Ford being shown in its slot the following day.

NBC filled the hour with two game shows beginning on January 8, 1979; The All-New Jeopardy! was relocated to the noon timeslot from the morning and paired with a new version of Password, Password Plus. The other thirty minutes allotted to America Alive! were given to another game show, All-Star Secrets, which also premiered on January 8 and took over the 10:30 AM timeslot that Jeopardy! had occupied. Of these three shows, Jeopardy! would be cancelled and end on March 2. All-Star Secrets was also cancelled, with the final episode airing on August 10. Password Plus was the longest running of the three, continuing until March 26, 1982.
