= Code word =

A code word or codeword may refer to:

- Code word (figure of speech), designed to convey a predetermined meaning to a receptive audience, while remaining inconspicuous to others
  - Procedure word, in voice communication
  - Code name, a clandestine name or cryptonym used to identify sensitive information
- Code word, an element of a cryptographic codebook designed so that the meaning of the code word is opaque without the code book
- Code word, a string of output symbols selected to represent an input symbol in a prefix code for data compression
- password, passcode, codeword, countersign; a word that is a special code for access, to pass a challenge of a sentry
- Code Words, an online coding and programming publication

== See also ==
- Brevity code
  - Ten-code, brevity codes in voice communication, particularly by law enforcement and in Citizens Band
- Cipher crossword, a puzzle
- Password (disambiguation)
- Safeword (disambiguation)
