= Take the Hint =

- Genre: Game show
- Based on: Password by Bob Stewart
- Presented by: Frank Wilson
- Country of origin: Australia
- Original language: English

Production
- Running time: 30 minutes

Original release
- Network: National Television Network
- Release: 23 July 1962 – 1966

Take the Hint is an Australian television game show which aired 1962-1966 on the National Television Network (now known as the Nine Network). Although popular enough to run for four years, not much information about the series is available on the Internet. It appears to have been based on American series Password.

Produced in Sydney, it was a 30-minute series hosted by Frank Wilson.

At one point during the run of the series in Sydney, it was preceded on the schedule by It Could Be You and followed by Keynotes and this was also the case during the same period in Melbourne.

== Game play ==
Two teams, each consisting of a contestant and guest personality, play a word game, in which the guest has to convey a word to their partner without saying the word.

== Episode status ==
Archive status is unknown. A brief 17-second clip appeared on YouTube but has since been removed, suggesting that an episode or episodes have existed more recently.
