= Ken Greengrass =

American music and television producer

- Born: Irwin Greengrass; June 22, 1926; Bronx, New York, United States
- Died: April 10, 2014 (aged 87) New York City, United States
- Occupations: Music producer, Television Producer, talent manager
- Instrument: Trumpet
- Years active: 1947–2014

Ken Greengrass (born Irwin Greengrass; June 22, 1926 – April 10, 2014) was an American music and television producer, perhaps best known as a manager of such musical performers as Eydie Gormé and Steve Lawrence, Art Garfunkel and Florence Henderson.

== Early life ==
Born in the Bronx, son of Abraham (Abe) and Anne Greengrass, he had one brother, Floyd. He graduated high school from the Manhattan School of Music.

== Career ==
Greengrass began his career in the entertainment industry as a professional trumpet player, and his knowledge of music led to a career managing artists and producing many of their albums, garnering dozens of gold records. Greengrass started in the music industry by playing trumpet in a band in which Eydie Gorme was the lead singer and Steve. Shortly thereafter, he became her Manager and helped direct her career and scores of others including Steve Lawrence, Diahann Carroll, Vlad De Briansky, Florence Henderson, John Pizzarelli, Townes Van Zandt, The Highwaymen (folk band) and Bob McGrath (of Sesame Street).

In the 1970s, Greengrass became an executive producer of television shows for all three major television networks. Greengrass was nominated for several Emmy Awards and won for NBC's “How the Beatles Changed the World.” Other award-winning programs included “A Piece of Cake,” “C’mon Saturday” and primetime special “My Father the Circus King,” which marked the first time an outside producer was permitted to film the Ringling Brothers circus family at work. In 2001, Greengrass produced a two-hour special for the Travel Channel, “The Secrets of San Simeon,” starring Patti Hearst.

Greengrass executive produced the ABC special “C’est la vie,” starring Diahann Carroll and Maurice Chevalier, and the ABC Afterschool Specials “The Unforgivable Secret” and “Sometimes I Don’t Love My Mother.” Greengrass packaged and produced America Alive! a live, one-hour weekly strip on NBC that was a forerunner of the current magazine format television shows.

Greengrass was executive producer of the Easter Seals and the Cerebral Palsy Foundation Telethons for many years, helping to raise millions of dollars for those charities. He was a member of the New York Friars Club for more than 55 years and served on its board of directors. He was chairman-producer of the New York Friars Club Celebrity “Roast” and in early 1998 conceived the idea of broadcasting the Friars Roast as a television special.

== Personal life ==
He married his wife, Gerry Olin Greengrass, on December 10, 1961. Greengrass had two children Adam and Jonathan, and two grandchildren Benjamin and Aden.

== Death ==
Greengrass died of a brief illness on April 10, 2014, in New York City surrounded by his family. He was 87.
