= A Word in Your Ear =

- Genre: Game show
- Created by: Gordon Burns; Geoff Kershaw
- Presented by: Gordon Burns
- Country of origin: United Kingdom
- Original language: English
- No. of series: 5

Production
- Production location: Television House
- Running time: 30 minutes
- Production companies: Stag and Kershaw Production Associates

Original release
- Network: Tyne Tees Television (1990–1991); BBC1 (1993–1994); The Family Channel (1995)
- Release: 8 August 1990 – 1995

A Word in Your Ear is a game show that originally aired on Tyne Tees Television from 8 August 1990 to 20 December 1991, then on BBC1 from 19 April 1993 to 14 October 1994 and finally on The Family Channel from 1995. It is hosted by Gordon Burns.

== Transmissions ==
Series	Start date	End date	Episodes
1	8 August 1990	10 October 1990	10
2	18 October 1991	20 December 1991	10
3	19 April 1993	28 May 1993	17
4	23 July 1994	14 October 1994	23
5	1995	1995	??
