= Crazy Cottage =

Children's game show

- Genre: Children's Game show
- Created by: Paul Zenon
- Presented by: Rick Adams (1996); Jez Edwards (1997-98)
- Voices of: Steve Nallon (Vera the Cuckoo)
- Country of origin: United Kingdom
- Original language: English
- No. of series: 3
- No. of episodes: 33

Production
- Production location: Carlton Studios
- Running time: 25 minutes
- Production companies: Action Time and Carlton

Original release
- Network: ITV
- Release: 4 April 1996 – 29 May 1998

Crazy Cottage is a children's game show that aired on ITV from 4 April 1996 to 29 May 1998. It was hosted by Rick Adams for the first series until he was replaced by Jez Edwards for the next two series. A puppet cuckoo called Vera was voiced by Steve Nallon. The gimmick of the show was that most things had to be performed backwards.

The show started with the presenter saying "goodbye", and then starting the games at Round 5. One of the rounds involved a series of actions that had to be performed in a certain order so that when it was played back in reverse, it matched what they were asked to do. Another round was a kitchen set up on a slope, but appeared to the viewers as a normal room.

At the end of the programme, the winning team (who had the fewest points) won a prize, such as a trip to Alton Towers. The losing team (with the most points) would win a backward invention, for example, a black lightbulb.

== Transmissions ==
Series	Start date	End date	Episodes
1	4 April 1996	4 July 1996	13
2	4 April 1997	6 June 1997	10
3	20 March 1998	29 May 1998	10
