= Password (game) =

Password is a board game based on the television game show Password developed by Goodson-Todman Productions.

== Gameplay ==
Password is a vocal team game in which all players play at the same time. One member from each team gets the same word. The players with the "password" from each team take turns giving clues to their partners, who try to guess the "password". A correct guess wins that round and scores points for the team, and the total points awarded decreases based on how many guesses it took to get the correct word. The game can be played until one team reaches a certain point total, or until players go through all the words on one pair of cards.

== Publication history ==
Milton Bradley published the board game version of Password in 1962. The game was republished in 1979 under the title Password Plus, and in 1984 using the title Super Password. The Silver anniversary edition was solid by Hasbro starting with the 25th anniversary of the show in 1986. More than two million copies were sold by 2000, with more than 25 different editions after the success of the first edition.

The home version was released by the Milton Bradley Company in 1962, the year after the series premiered on CBS. 24 editions of the original home game (numbered 1-12 and 14-25) were produced from 1962 through 1986. Milton Bradley also released several editions of a Password Plus home game.

A newer version of the game is currently in its seventh edition by Endless Games. Endless Games has also released a home version of 2008's Million Dollar Password.

== Reception ==
The book Games: American Boxed Games and Their Makers, 1822–1992 notes that Password was one of the most successful board games based on quiz shows, along with Family Feud, Hollywood Squares, Jeopardy, The Match Game, and Wheel of Fortune. Password and Jeopardy were the only games based on board games as of 1992 that continued to sell well while the TV programs were no longer on the air (1968–70 for "Password" and 1975–77 for "Jeopardy").

Jim Gladstone in the 2004 book Gladstone's Games to Go: Verbal Volleys, Coin Contests, Dot Duels, and Other Games for Boredom-Free Days said that "One of the all-time greatest party games. Password requires an ingenious blend of logical thinking and creativity."

== In popular culture ==
- In the 1996 movie The Cable Guy, the protagonists play a game of Password but only using obscene words.
