= Gas Street Studios =

Television studios in Birmingham, England

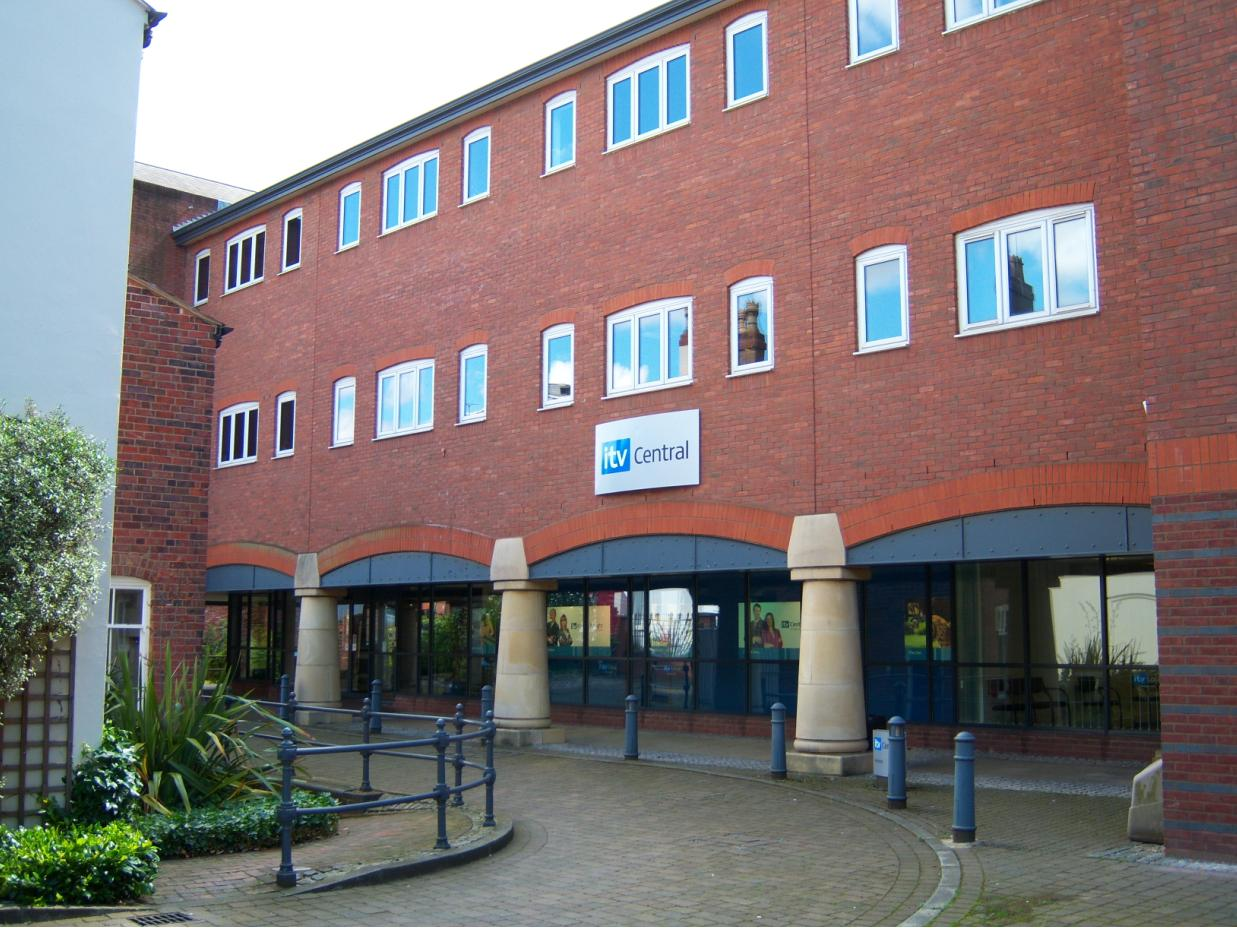
- Gas Street Studios as it appears today (with 2006 ITV Central logo).

- Location within West Midlands county
- Former names: Carlton Court (1994-1995), Central Court (1995-2009), Carlton Television Birmingham (1999-2003)

General information
- Type: Television studios
- Location: Birmingham, Central Court; Gas Street, England
- Coordinates: 52.476765°N 1.910269°W
- Current tenants: ITV Central
- Construction started: August 1995
- Completed: June 1997
- Inaugurated: 1995
- Client: ITV Central
- Landlord: Cube Real Estate

Design and construction
- Architecture firm: Peter Hing & Jones (Birmingham)

Gas Street Studios is a studio complex operated by ITV plc in Birmingham, England. The complex is currently only used by ITV Central for the broadcast of ITV News Central and much of the complex has been sold off for other uses. The complex had also previously been used for other broadcasts including the former home of CITV. Today only 45 ITV Central staff work at the Gas Street Studios, significantly less than in June 1997 when the studios opened and there were over 400 staff working for Central Independent Television at the site.

== History ==
In 1993, a company called Gas Street Developments Ltd. (GSDL) acquired land bounded by Gas Street and Berkley Street and adjacent Berkley Street Gas Works. The original plan, as approved, was to develop the site as mixed use office space and a multistorey car park of five storeys. In 1994, Central Broadcasting (and latterly Carlton) approached GSDL with an interest in the site and bought the freehold.

The initial plan was for two 3 storey buildings, one housing transmission and playout, and the other housing post production, television news and CITV (with a smaller studio contained within it for each). However the plans were revised in June 1995, with much of the building being as constructed, as a three storey office block with a studio in the middle (Studio A) - it was noted within the planning application that if the studio site was to be vacated by Central Television, the studio itself could become an atrium (and the roof constructed to be easily removed).

== Branding ==
The studios were designed to have the Central Television logo constructed in key locations about the building (notably inside circular brick features on the gable ends, however these were never built into the brickwork due to changes in branding). Until 2003, a Central logo was paved into the block paving directly outside the then reception area. The signage installed upon completion was the Carlton-style logo which had replaced Central's own logotype in 1998. This was itself replaced with the Carlton name from 1999 until 2004. When Carlton merged with Granada, it featured ITV Central branding which was updated in 2006 when the new ITV logo came into use.

== Studios ==
=== Studio A ===
Studio A was the main studio when the complex opened. Located in the centre of the building, surrounded by offices and technical space, on the ground level it had a floor space of 59 ft x 59 ft, and a ceiling height of 22 ft It was occupied by Central News with a permanently struck set and a space left free for other current affairs based programming, or studio production to use. The studio itself was a conventional studio with a full height lighting grid.

In 2000, CITV moved into Studio A to make use of the larger floor plan and grid height and Central News (West) moved to the former CITV studio.

In 2004, with the removal of in-vision continuity for CITV's programme strand and transmission and playout of the service moving to Granada Television, ITV announced its plan to leave its studio site at Lenton Lane in Nottingham, and also move the studio and presentation of Central News (East) to Birmingham. Between September 2004 and January 2005, Studio A was decommissioned and split in two to house both programmes.

==== Studio W (West) and Studio E (East) ====
The newly split studios were named Studio E and Studio W indicating which programme came from which studio - though both programmes could swap studios or share one as and when required. Studio W had a slightly larger floor plan of 32 ft x 59 ft than Studio E, which was 27 ft x59ft. These also became the first studios to be fitted with the standardised ITV News Group sets after London.

Network productions occasionally came from both Studio W and E, with Nightwatch with Steve Scott having its links filmed in Studio W, and the People's Millions with Katie Derham using Studio E.

In 2009, as part of a cost-cutting exercise, ITV plc announced that Central's two regional programmes would merge, with a short opt-out at the start of the programme devoted to news to each specific sub-region. One of these would be recorded 15 minutes before transmission using the presentation team from Central News (West). Consequently, Studio E became surplus to requirements and was closed.

In 2010, as a result of ITV selling the building, Studio E became a rentable space and is now a Carl Zeiss AG showroom.

=== Studio P ===
Studio P was a smaller television studio, built for in-vision continuity for CITV and regional weather forecasts for Central TV. This was normal office space of minimal floor space, but was equipped with soundproofing and a low lighting grid in place of the suspended ceiling. CITV moved to Studio A and Central News (West) moved to Studio P in 2000, before eventually both services shared studio A's floor space from 2001 until 2004.

== Uses ==
=== Former uses ===
The complex was used for the in-vision continuity links for CITV until this was moved to Granada Studios in Manchester in September 2004. From its opening until 2005 it was where ITV Central continuity was handled - the last to stop being produced locally after ITV switched to national continuity in 2002, which was broadcast from London. Central's transmission was also handled here until October 2004, when ITV plc closed the department and moved transmission to the Northern Transmission Centre in Leeds.

All networked programming for the ITV network from Gas Street ceased in 2005 leaving only the Central Tonight production from the studios. Central News East was moved to the studios on 5 February 2005 following the closure of Carlton Studios in Nottingham. The East Midlands version of Central News was then presented from Studio E until 23 February 2009 when both regions started using the same studio.

=== Current uses ===
The only programme currently broadcast from the studios is ITV Central news programme ITV News Central.

The national ITV plc feedback service (ITV Viewer Services) is also based at the complex.

== Non-broadcast uses ==
ITV have since also sold the Gas Street office building to Cube Real Estate, a commercial property developer, which has refurbished the interior of the building. While Central maintains office space and a single ground floor studio, the other studio and floors are available to rent as office space. The property is marketed as 22 Gas Street.
