= Pat Mitchell =

American journalist (born 1943)

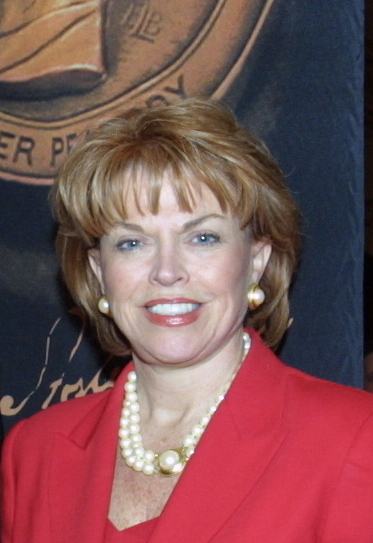
- Mitchell in 2002
- Born: January 20, 1943 (age 83); Swainsboro, Georgia, U.S.
- Education: University of Georgia BA, MA
- Occupation: Global media businesswoman
- Spouse: Scott Seydel
- Children: 6
- Website: www.patmitchellmedia.com

Pat Mitchell (born January 20, 1943) is a media executive. She was the first woman president and CEO of PBS. She is editorial director of TEDWomen.

== Early life and education ==
Pat Mitchell graduated from the University of Georgia with bachelor's and master's degrees in English literature. She received a drama scholarship to attend college.

== Career ==
Pat Mitchell started her career as an English instructor at the University of Georgia and Virginia Commonwealth University. During this time, a freelance article she wrote about student movements came to the attention of an editor at Look, starting her career in journalism. Nine months later, in 1971, Look published its final issue, and Mitchell was advised to "try television." After several auditions, Mitchell was hired at WBZ in Boston as a full-time television reporter.

Over the next three decades, she worked as a news reporter and news anchor, national talk show host, and White House correspondent. She also created and produced documentaries and series, many of which focused on women. She was a co-host on the daily NBC daytime talk show America Alive! in 1978. Around the same time, she was a co-host on the CBS primetime series based on the People magazine.

In the mid-80s, she left a position at NBC to establish an independent production company to create, produce and host the daytime series Woman to Woman, which was the first national program produced and hosted by a woman. Woman to Woman also became the first television series to be added to the Schlesinger Library on the History of Women at Radcliffe College.

In 1992, Mitchell approached media entrepreneur Ted Turner about producing a documentary series on the history of women in America. The 6-hour series, A Century of Women, was broadcast in 1994 on Turner cable networks and received three Emmy award nominations.

In 2000, Pat Mitchell left Turner Broadcasting when she was appointed the first woman president and CEO of PBS. Mitchell left PBS in 2006. After departing PBS, Mitchell was appointed the president and CEO of the Paley Center for Media, an American cultural institution in New York.

In 2010, Mitchell launched TEDWomen, an annual three-day conference under the umbrella of TED Talks. Mitchell became its editorial director, curator and host. The conference, described as being "about the power of women and girls to be creators and change-makers", had speakers including former presidential candidate Hillary Clinton, ex-Facebook COO Sheryl Sandberg and former House Speaker Nancy Pelosi.

In 2022, Mitchell was one of the producers of the documentary Refuge, which followed a Syrian Kurd, a former Klansman, and a town of refugees in Clarkston, Georgia. As of 2021, she was chair of the Sundance Institute and the Women's Media Center, and a trustee of the VDAY movement, the Skoll Foundation and the Acumen Fund.

== Awards and honors ==
Documentaries produced under Mitchell's direction have won more than 100 major awards, including 41 Emmy Awards, seven Peabody Awards and 35 CableACEs. She personally received a Prime-Time Emmy Award in 1996 for Survivors of the Holocaust on TBS, and was personally nominated for four other Prime-Time Emmys.

In 2008, Mitchell was inducted into the Broadcasting and Cable Hall of Fame. She was also named one of the "Most Powerful Women in Hollywood" by The Hollywood Reporter and featured in Fast Company’s special report, "The League of Extraordinary Women: 60 Influencers Who Are Changing the World".

In 2012, The Women's Media Center honored Mitchell with their first annual Lifetime Achievement Award. Mitchell has also been recognized with the Sandra Day O'Connor Award for Leadership, and was honored by the Center for the Advancement of Women for her accomplishments and contributions in the world of communications in creating a more equitable society for women. She is also one of 12 Americans awarded the Bodley Medal from the Oxford University. Mitchell was appointed by House Minority Leader Nancy Pelosi as one of nine commissioners to develop a plan to build a National Women's History Museum in Washington, D.C. The commission delivered its report to Congress in the fall of 2016.

== Personal life ==
Mitchell and her husband, Scott Seydel, have six children and 13 grandchildren and reside in New York City and Atlanta, Georgia.

== Bibliography ==
- Becoming a Dangerous Woman: Embracing Risk to Change the World, Seal Press
