= Password (American game show) =

American television game show

- Also known as: Password All-Stars (1974–1975)
- Genre: Game show
- Created by: Bob Stewart
- Directed by: Lou Tedesco (1961–1967); Mike Gargiulo (1961–1967); Stuart W. Phelps (1971–1975); Ira Skutch (1971–1975); Tony McCuin (2022–present)
- Presented by: Allen Ludden; Keke Palmer
- Announcer: Jack Clark; Lee Vines; Bern Bennett; John Harlan; A. D. Miles
- Theme music composer: Kurt Rehfeld (1961–1963); Bob Cobert (1963–1967); Score Productions (1971–1975); James Poyser (2022–present)
- Country of origin: United States
- Original language: English
- No. of seasons: 6 (CBS); 5 (ABC); 3 (NBC)
- No. of episodes: 1,555 (CBS Daytime); 201 (CBS Primetime); 1,099 (ABC); 42 (NBC)

Production
- Executive producers: Frank Wayne (1961–1975); Jimmy Fallon (2022–present); John Quinn (2022–present); Jim Juvonen (2022–present)
- Producer: Howard Felsher (1971–1975)
- Production locations: CBS Studio 52; New York, New York (1961–1966); CBS Television City; Los Angeles, California (1962–1967); CBS Studio 50; New York, New York (1966–1967); ABC Television Center; Los Angeles, California (1971–1975); Vine Street Theatre; Los Angeles, California (1971–1975); Universal Studios Lot; Universal City, California (2022–2025); Palisade Stages; Kearny, New Jersey (2025-present)
- Running time: 22–23 minutes (1961–1975); 25–26 minutes (1962–1967; primetime); 43 minutes (2022–present)
- Production companies: Mark Goodson-Bill Todman Productions (1961–1975); Universal Television Alternative Studio (2022–present); Electric Hot Dog (2022–present); Fremantle (2022–present)

Original release
- Network: CBS
- Release: October 2, 1961 – September 15, 1967
- Network: ABC
- Release: April 5, 1971 – June 27, 1975
- Network: NBC
- Release: August 9, 2022 – present

Related
- Password Plus; Super Password; Million Dollar Password

Password is an American television game show. Two teams, each composed of a celebrity and contestant, attempt to convey mystery words to each other using single-word clues, in order to win cash prizes. There have been various incarnations of the show have aired on television since the 1960s.

The show was created by Bob Stewart and originally produced by Mark Goodson-Bill Todman Productions. It aired on CBS from 1961 to 1967, and ABC from 1971 to 1975. Versions of the show in the 1970s added a number of gameplay variations, among them a switch to a format with celebrities playing for charity. Allen Ludden was the host of every version aired between 1961 and 1975. Two revivals later aired on NBC: Password Plus from 1979 to 1982, and Super Password from 1984 to 1989. CBS aired a primetime version, Million Dollar Password, from 2008 to 2009. All three of these versions introduced new variations in gameplay. In 2022, NBC premiered another primetime revival of Password hosted by Keke Palmer, with Jimmy Fallon serving as one of the celebrity partners as well as executive producer.

== Gameplay ==
Two teams, each primarily consisting of one celebrity player and one civilian contestant, compete. A mystery word, known as a "password", is given to one player on each team and shown onscreen to viewers; on most incarnations, the announcer also whispers the password to the audience. Gameplay alternates between the two teams. On each team, the player who is given the password must attempt to convey it to their partner using a singular word clue. Invalid clues include using the word or any part of it; using hand gestures; using more than one word or a hyphenated word; using a made-up word; or failing to give a clue. Proper nouns and non-English words may be used as clues, and words that have already been given as clues may be repeated. If the teammate fails to guess the correct password, it is then passed to the opposing team unless the password or part of it was given as a clue, at which point the password is discarded and a new one is selected. Guessing the password on the first attempt awards the most possible points, with each successive attempt being worth one point less than the one before it. Gameplay continues until the password is correctly guessed and points awarded, or all possible turns have been exhausted, and a new password is selected.

Originally, the maximum value of a password was 10 points, with a cash prize awarded to the first team to reach 25 points. With the 2022 version, the standard maximum value of the first guess is just 6 points, with a goal of 15 points. On the 2022 version, once per game, a team may also choose to "shoot the moon" or play the password for eight points if it is guessed on the first attempt. Games are played to a best of three format, with the celebrities switching teams after the first round, and the winning team proceeding to the bonus round.

=== Bonus round ===
The original version of the show featured one of the first bonus rounds for a television game show, known as the "Lightning Round". The celebrity of the winning team was given five passwords, and attempted to convey each one to his or her teammate within 60 seconds. Each correctly guessed word was worth $50.

On the 2022 version, the bonus round is played with 10 passwords, each starting with consecutive letters of the alphabet. The winning contestant is given a combined 60 seconds to attempt conveying all ten passwords to the celebrities. During the first 30 seconds, the contestant plays with one of the two celebrity partners, after which point the other celebrity takes over, and the round continues from the remaining letters including any that were passed earlier by the contestant. If an illegal clue is given with the first celebrity guesser, that password is discarded and replaced with another one beginning with the same letter. If an illegal clue is given with the second celebrity guesser, the player is forfeited from winning the grand prize but still get money for how many of the remaining unpenalized passwords guessed correctly. Each correctly guessed password is worth $1,000, with a grand prize of $25,000 if they all are correctly guessed.

If the contestant fails to get all 10, they are given a final password and will convey a clue to the two celebrities. The celebrities deliberate and give the host what they think is the answer. A correct answer doubles the money earned by the contestant.

=== Contestants ===
On the CBS daytime version, contestants played two matches, win or lose, with each game awarding $100 to the winner. For most of the CBS nighttime version's first year, the same two players stayed for the entire show, playing as many matches as time allowed with each player guaranteed at least $100. However, after three contestants managed to break the $1,000 mark, this practice was changed in November 1962 to having two new contestants play each game (generally, three pairs of contestants competed in the course of each show), with winning contestants receiving $250 and losers receiving a consolation prize (usually $50).

Early on in the ABC version the contestants played a single-elimination game with the winning contestants could stay until they were either defeated or won a maximum of 10 games, thus retiring them as undefeated champions. Later on, the limit was dropped, and champions stayed on the show until defeated. From 1973 onward, games are played to a best of three format.

=== Format changes ===
From November 18, 1974, to February 21, 1975, Password became Password All-Stars, where teams of celebrities played for charity in a tournament-style format. At the end of each week, the highest scorer would win $5,000 and advance to the Grandmasters' Championship, which would award the winner another $25,000. This version included a number of gameplay changes, with some being retained by the format throughout the 1970s even after the show reverted to standard contestants playing with celebrities. Among these was an elimination round in which four contestants (two new players and the two players from the previous game) competed with the help of the two celebrities in the first round. In the qualifying round, one of the two celebrities used a one-word clue to a password (with both celebrities alternating turns on giving clues), and the four contestants would ring in with the password. If no contestant identified the password after four clues, the word would be discarded. A correct response earned that contestant one point, with three points needed to qualify for the regular game. An incorrect response locked that player out of the word in play. The first two contestants to reach three points went on to play the regular game.

In the regular game, an addition to the rules was the "double" option, in which the first clue giver could ask to increase the word value to 20 points by giving only one clue; if that word was missed, the other team could score the 20 points with a second clue. The first team to reach 50 points or more could win thousands of dollars in the Big Money Lightning Round, using a three-step structure in which the winning team attempted to guess three passwords within 30 seconds per step:

- Part One: Each password paid $25. Guessing all three passwords in 30 seconds further netted $5 for each second left on the clock. The round ended if the contestant was unable to guess at least one of the three passwords.
- Part Two: The money earned in part one would be multiplied by the number of passwords guessed here. (e.g.: If a contestant guessed all three words in part one and there was 7 seconds left, each word would be worth $110) Naming all three passwords this time added $10 for each second left. If the receiver failed to identify at least one of the passwords here, the round ended and the contestant still kept all part-one winnings; he or she then returned to the elimination panel to compete for the right to play the main game again.
- Part Three: Naming all three passwords in 30 seconds multiplied the contestant's part-two winnings tenfold (meaning if a player accumulated $500 after two parts, guessing all three passwords in this part would earn $5,000).

Champions were retired upon reaching or exceeding ABC's winnings limit of $20,000.

=== Personnel ===
Each version of Password airing from 1961 until 1975 was hosted by Allen Ludden. A number of announcers alternated, including Jack Clark, Lee Vines, Bern Bennett, and John Harlan. In each episode from 1961 to 1975, Ludden would caution the players about unacceptable clues by informing the players and the viewing audience of the show's judge or "word authority", who would determine the validity of each clue. Word authorities on the CBS version included New York University professor David H. Greene and World Book Encyclopedia Dictionary editor Dr. Reason A. Goodwin. Robert Stockwell from UCLA and Carolyn Duncan served as word authorities during the ABC version.

== Broadcast history ==
=== CBS: 1961–1967 ===
Former logo, used in 1967.

Password originally aired on CBS in the 2:00 PM (1:00 Central) time slot, replacing the courtroom-themed game Face the Facts. A concurrent prime-time version debuted in January 1962.

Over the next year, The Newlywed Game and Days of Our Lives got higher ratings than Password. CBS daytime head Fred Silverman canceled Password in early 1967. Silverman wanted the show permanently moved to CBS Television City, where it was moved for part of the 1966–1967 season for taping in color because CBS's New York studios had not made the full switch to color. Mark Goodson, however, opposed permanently moving the show to Hollywood.

Password was most often taped in New York at CBS-TV Studio 52 (later converted to the Studio 54 discothèque) and CBS-TV Studio 50 (the Ed Sullivan Theater) until the end of the daytime run in 1967. The original CBS version made annual trips to CBS Television City during the 1960s, including once when the CBS New York studios were upgraded for color TV. During its run, Password was taped in all four of the studios at different times (31, 33, 41 and 43).

=== ABC: 1971–1975 ===
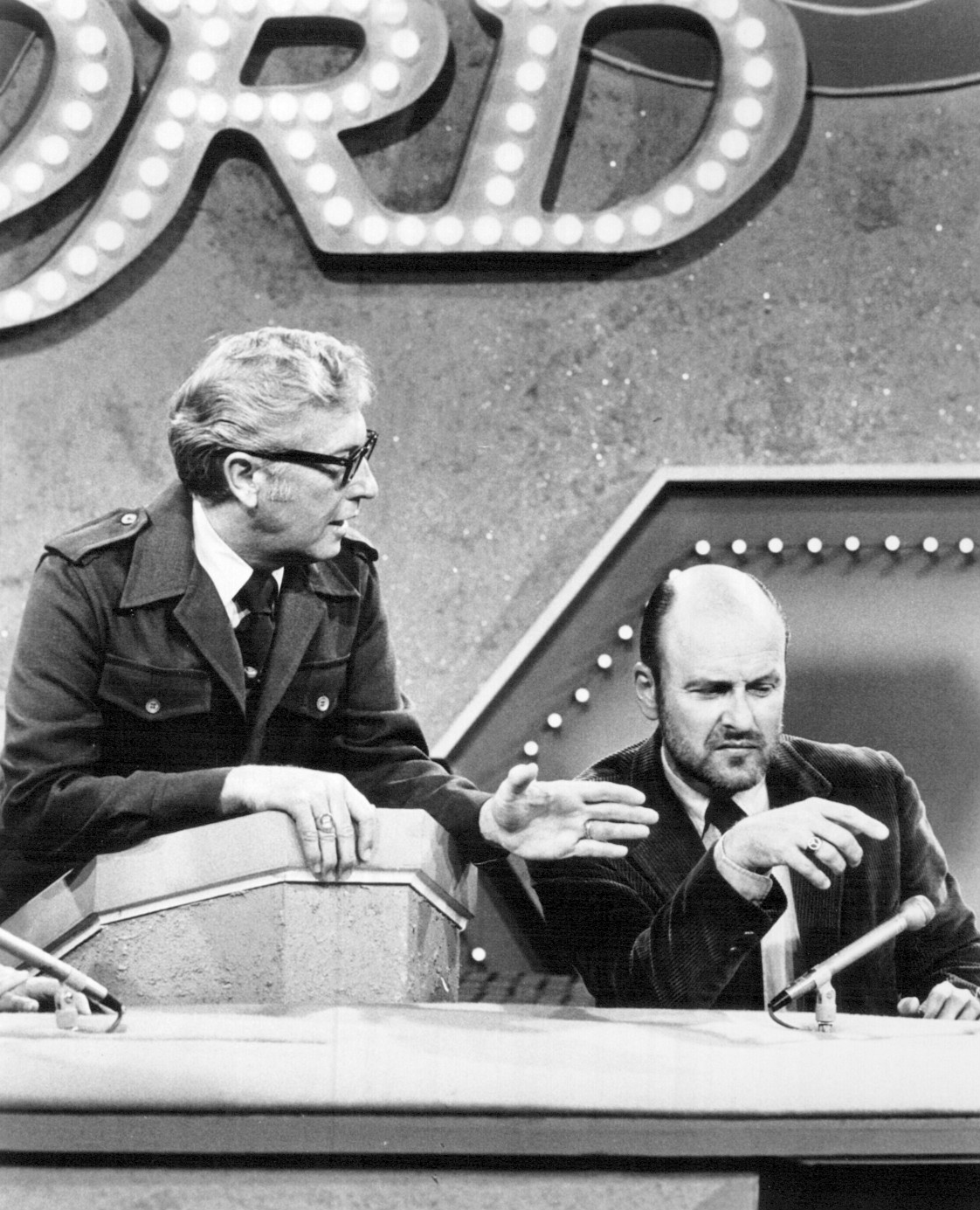
Ludden with Werner Klemperer on Password in 1971

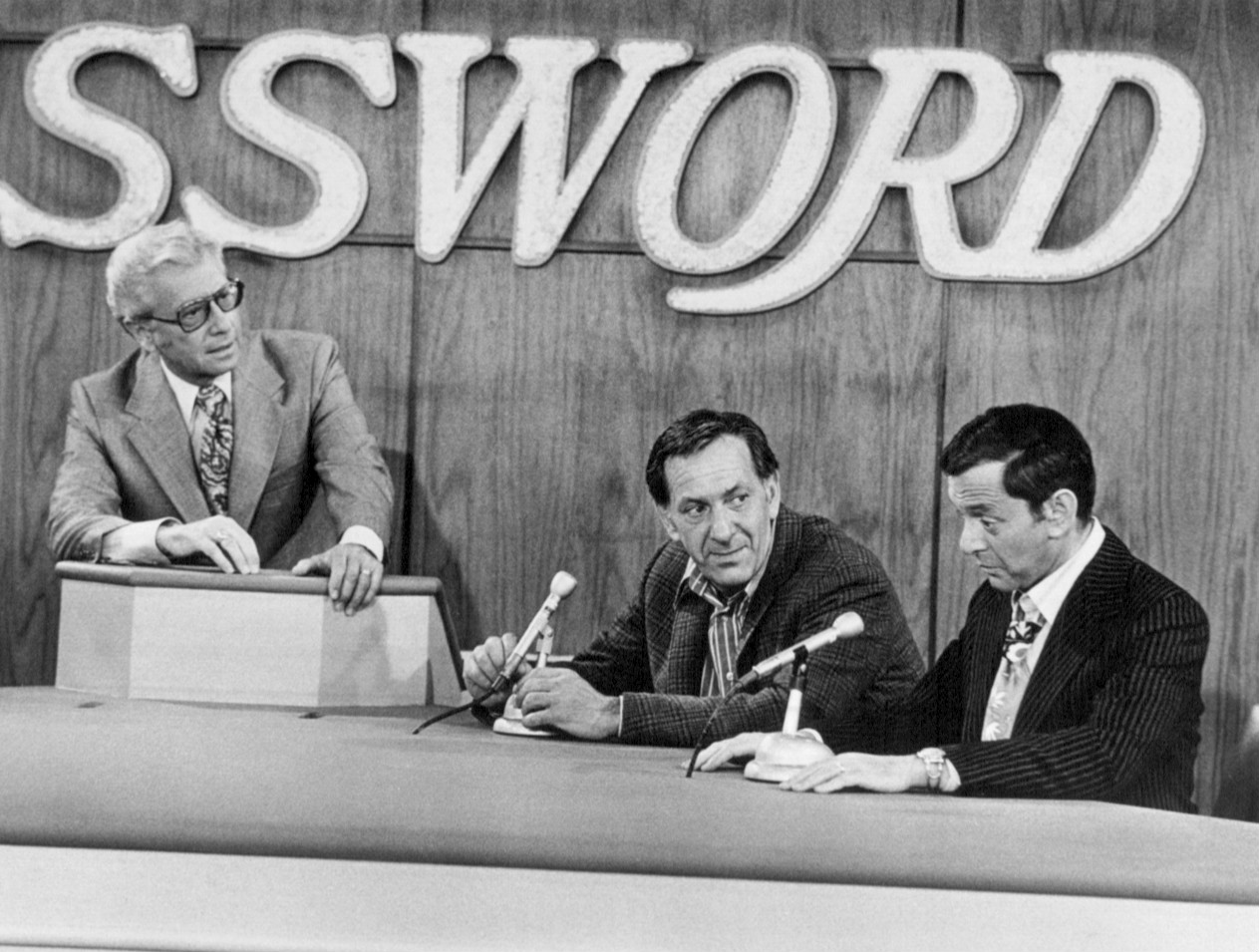
The show was featured in a 1972 episode of The Odd Couple series, in which Oscar and Felix were contestants

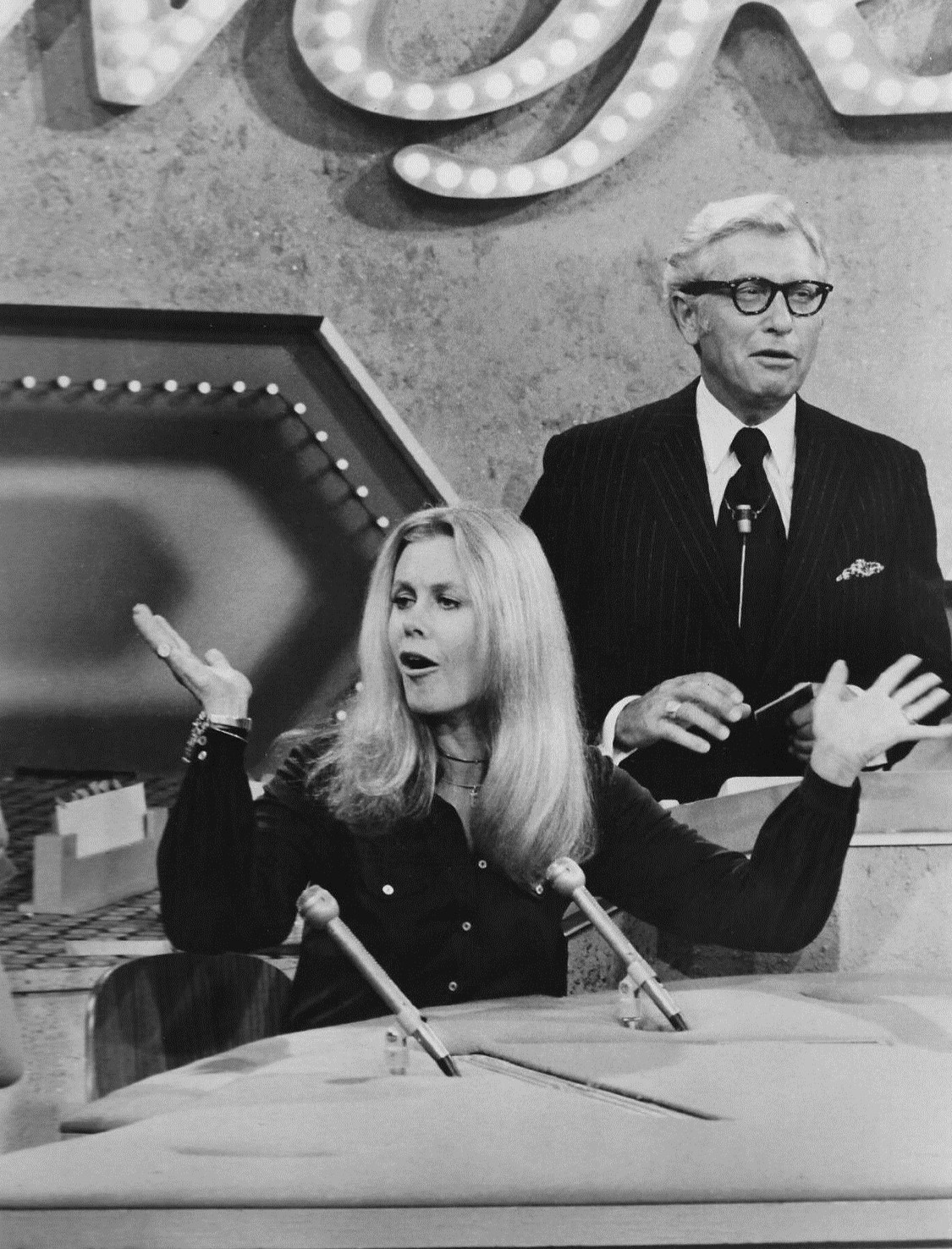
Ludden with Elizabeth Montgomery on Password in 1972

Goodson-Todman sold reruns of the CBS version to local stations via syndication in the late 1960s, and in some markets, they performed quite well in mid-morning or late-afternoon slots. This prompted ABC to contact Mark Goodson about reviving the game; this time around, Goodson agreed to have the show tape in Hollywood per ABC's wishes. Password would become Goodson-Todman's first show to be staged in Los Angeles full-time rather than New York City. The company eventually moved almost all production to southern California during the 1970s. The show was taped at ABC Studio TV-10, "The Vine Street Theater," in Hollywood and the ABC Television Center.

The network slated Password to replace soap opera Dark Shadows at 4:00 PM (3:00 Central) on April 5, 1971. It managed strong results against NBC's Somerset and reruns of Gomer Pyle – USMC on CBS.

ABC promoted the show to 12:30 PM (11:30 AM Central) on September 6, swapping timeslot with reruns of Love, American Style, where it faced stronger challenges in the form of CBS' Search for Tomorrow and NBC's The Who, What, or Where Game. Password held up well there for six months until the network moved it up a half-hour to 12:00 PM (11:00 AM Central) on March 20, 1972, for the new Hatos-Hall game Split Second. Password came in a solid second to NBC's Jeopardy! and out-performed the CBS soap Where the Heart Is. CBS replaced Heart on March 26, 1973, with the youth-oriented The Young and the Restless, causing Password to hit ratings trouble over the next couple of years.

Even though NBC moved Jeopardy! on January 7, 1974, from 12:00 PM to 10:30 AM (9:30 Central) in favor of Jackpot!, the ABC Password was sliding into third place. In May, the show won the first-ever Daytime Emmy Award for Outstanding Game Show. A large Emmy statue then became part of the set's backdrop until the overhaul in November.

Beginning on July 15, 1974, a number of changes ensued. Monty Hall guest-hosted a number of weeks so that Ludden could play the game, and multiple other variations featured celebrity panels playing for charity. On November 18, 1974, the show switched to an all-celebrity format called Password All-Stars. This was reverted to the usual format on February 24, 1975, until the show's cancellation on June 27, when it was replaced by another Goodson-Todman game show, Showoffs.

=== 1979–1989: Password Plus and Super Password ===
Between 1979 and 1989, two revivals of Password aired on NBC. First was Password Plus, which debuted on January 8, 1979, with Ludden returning as host. This version added a number of changes to the main game, most notably a structure wherein each round consists of five passwords that have a common theme, and points are scored by correctly identifying what each password has in common. Ludden hosted until 1980, owing to complications of stomach cancer. Bill Cullen and Tom Kennedy both filled in for him, with the latter becoming the permanent host after Ludden's death. Gene Wood and Johnny Olson alternated as primary announcers on this format.

On September 24, 1984, the show was revived for NBC under the title Super Password, with largely identical gameplay to that of Password Plus. This version was hosted by Bert Convy, with Rich Jeffries serving as the original announcer before Wood replaced him. Super Password ran until March 24, 1989.

=== Million Dollar Password ===
CBS picked up a new version of the show entitled Million Dollar Password, hosted by Regis Philbin, which premiered on June 1, 2008, and ran for 12 episodes over two seasons. The series was taped in New York. The first season was taped at the Kaufman Astoria Studios in New York City, and the second season was taped at the CBS Studio Center in Los Angeles.

=== Buzzr (YouTube) ===
From March 4, 2015, until June 18, 2016, the Buzzr YouTube channel had a very short-lived online reboot of Password hosted by Steve Zaragoza where various internet celebrities were teamed up as contestants instead of a celebrity and civilian being paired up. The pilot aired previously from January 6 until February 17, 2015. In the same year, the online website Game Show Garbagegave it "The Patrick Wayne Award" in the "Internet Category" voted by fans naming it as "The Worst Internet Game Show of 2014-2015".

=== NBC: 2022 ===
NBC announced a new version of Password from Fremantle with Jimmy Fallon as executive producer, on May 17, 2021, during NBCUniversal's upfronts presentation. On January 24, 2022, a casting notice was put out. In April 2022, it was reported that Keke Palmer would serve as host, and that the show would premiere in the summer, later specified as August 9. The first episode was dedicated to Betty White. Each hour-long episode consists of two half-hour matches, each with different pairs of contestants. On May 12, 2023, the series was renewed for a second season; however, production was delayed to November 2023 due to Fallon's support of the 2023 Writers Guild of America strike. After a holiday special on December 18, 2023, it was announced on January 29, 2024 that the second season would premiere on March 12, 2024. On August 27, 2025, the series was renewed for a third season, which premiered on June 2, 2026. This edition features Fallon as a regular celebrity player and is characterized by an exaggerated excitement level among players and the audience not demonstrated with earlier versions of the game.

== Reception ==
In 2013, TV Guide ranked it number eight in its list of the 60 greatest game shows ever.

== Home media ==
On December 2, 2008, BCI Entertainment Company LLC (under license from FremantleMedia Enterprises) released a DVD box set "The Best of Password, starring Allen Ludden: The CBS Years - 1962–1967". The set predominantly features the nighttime show, with most of the final disc containing daytime episodes from 1967; notably, despite their existence, neither the nighttime nor daytime finales are present. This 3-disc set contains 30 episodes of Password (1961 daytime episodes and 1962-1967 primetime episodes), uncut and unedited, and also digitally transferred, remastered, and restored from the original B&W kinescopes and original 2-inch color videotapes.

Although Password began in 1961, the DVD set consistently states "The CBS Years: 1962–1967". This misleading title may be due to the earliest episode on the set being the nighttime premiere, which aired in early 1962. A rerelease by Mill Creek, which acquired the rights to the Fremantle game-show DVD sets following BCI's collapse, corrected this error.

An early mock-up of the packaging showed host Ludden on the later CBS set, with the original ABC logo on the front of the desk (as well as on the spine), while a slew of celebrities was listed on the bottom of the cover. Further, the press release stated that the set would range "from the early 1960s all the way up to the mid 1970s", indicating that ABC episodes would be included. A later update to the box art removed the celebrity list and clarified that the set would only cover the CBS era, although the ABC logo was still present (the front cover now had it in place of the CBS logo above Ludden). The ABC logo was omitted altogether when the DVD set was released, with the CBS logo behind Ludden in the original picture being enlarged.

== Episode status ==
Almost the entirety of the CBS primetime version of Password exists and has aired at various times on Game Show Network. A good chunk of the CBS daytime version, particularly the episodes taped at CBS Television City in Los Angeles, also survived wiping, likely due to Goodson-Todman selling these episodes to syndication, and have also aired on GSN in the past. The daytime edition currently airs on Buzzr and the primetime episodes have previously been featured.

The ABC daytime version has largely been wiped, with only a handful of surviving episodes. This was one of the last Goodson-Todman shows to be a victim of wiping practices before the production company blocked the practice moving forward, so they could sell the reruns to syndication.

NBC's Password Plus and Super Password are fully intact and have aired on GSN in the past. Currently both air on Buzzr.

Reruns of Million Dollar Password have aired on GSN.

== International versions ==
Country	Title	Broadcaster	Presenter	Premiere	Finale
Australia	Take the Hint	Nine Network	Frank Wilson	July 23, 1962	1966
Australia	Password	Unknown		1972	1973
Brazil	Passe A Palavra	SBT	Silvio Santos	1995	1995
France	Mot de passe : le duel	France 2	Laurence Boccolini; Camille Cerf	January 20, 2025	October 2, 2026
France	Mot de passe	France 3	Damien Thévenot	October 26, 2026	present
Germany	Passwort	SDR/SWF	Wolf Mittler	1964	1966
Hungary	Password – A jelszó	TV2	Ramóna Lékai-Kiss	December 31, 2024	April 17, 2025
Israel	Password פאסוורד	Channel 13	Maya Wertheimer	September 5, 2023	February 28, 2025
Italy	Password (part of Amici di Maria De Filippi)	Canale 5	Alessandro Cattelan	March 21, 2026	May 17, 2026
Lithuania	Slaptažodis	LNK	Justinas Jankevičius	September 1, 2026	present
Mexico	Password: La Palabra Secreta	TV Azteca	Lolita Cortés	May 20, 2023	January 31, 2025
New Zealand	Password	Unknown		2006	2006
Slovakia	Heslo	TV JOJ	Milan Zimnýkoval	July 6, 2017	June 5, 2018
Slovakia	Heslo	TV JOJ	Jasmina Alagič	January 8, 2024	January 29, 2024
Spain	Password	Antena 3	Cristina Pedroche	July 28, 2023	December 30, 2023
United Kingdom	Password	ITV	Shaw Taylor	March 12, 1963	September 10, 1963
United Kingdom	Password	BBC2	Brian Redhead	March 24, 1973	April 28, 1973
United Kingdom	Password	BBC1	Eleanor Summerfield	January 7, 1974	January 3, 1976
United Kingdom	Password	BBC1	Esther Rantzen	January 7, 1974	January 3, 1976
United Kingdom	Password	Channel 4	Tom O'Connor	November 6, 1982	May 14, 1983
United Kingdom	Password	Ulster	Brian Munn	September 2, 1985	July 29, 1988
United Kingdom	Password	Ulster	Gordon Burns	September 2, 1985	July 29, 1988
United Kingdom	Password	ITV	Gordon Burns	September 2, 1985	July 29, 1988
United Kingdom	Password	ITV	Stephen Mangan	August 31, 2024	present
Turkey	Password	Kanal D	Şebnem Bozoklu and Enis Arıkan	July 19, 2024	July 23, 2025
Vietnam	Ngạc nhiên chưa?	HTV	Đại Nghĩa	October 7, 2015	January 2, 2024

== Home games ==
The Milton Bradley Company introduced the first home version of Password in 1962 and subsequently released 24 editions of the game until 1986. Owing to common superstition, these releases were numbered 1–12 and 14–25, skipping 13. It was tied with Concentration as the most prolific of Milton Bradley's home versions of popular game shows and was produced well into the Super Password era of the television show. Milton Bradley also published three editions of a Password Plus home game between 1979 and 1981, but never did a version for Super Password.

Since 1997, Endless Games has released seven editions of Password, including a children's edition (with gameplay closer to the various incarnations of Pyramid), a special "50th Anniversary Edition" in 2011 and a DVD edition featuring the voice of Todd Newton (notably, the latter uses the original ABC logo on its packaging). In addition, Endless released a home version of Million-Dollar Password in 2008.

A computer version of Super Password was released by GameTek for MS-DOS systems, as well as the Apple II and Commodore 64, shortly before the series was canceled. A Nintendo Entertainment System version was also planned but never released. Tiger Electronics released an electronic hand-held "Super Password" game in the late 1990s. More recently, Irwin Toy released a new hand-held electronic version featuring a touch screen with a stylus to enter words.

An online version of Password was once available on its now-defunct website Uproar.com where instead of just one partner every time, you were allowed to play along with lots of other people in a party atmosphere. However, as of September 30, 2006, the website no longer offers any game show-based online games of any kind.

Interactive online versions of Password Plus and Super Password were once available from Game Show Network where you would play along while watching the show.

As with several other Goodson-Todman/Goodson game shows, Password has been adapted into a slot machine by WMS Gaming. A simulated Allen Ludden emcees the proceedings, with the voices and caricatures of Rose Marie, Dawn Wells, Adam West, and Marty Allen. One bonus round offers the player free spins; the other involves choosing from four envelopes offered by the celebrities. Finding the "Password" envelope advances the player to a new level with four more envelopes, worth more prize money.

== See also ==
- Subconscious Password, a comedic 2013 3D animated short inspired by the original Password.

Preceded by First winner	Daytime Emmy Award for Outstanding Game/Audience Participation Show; 1974	Succeeded by Hollywood Squares
Preceded by Face the Facts	2:00 p.m. EST, CBS; 10/2/61 – 9/15/67	Succeeded by Love Is a Many Splendored Thing
Preceded by Dark Shadows	4:00 p.m. EST, ABC; 4/5/71 – 8/27/71	Succeeded by Love, American Style
Preceded by Love, American Style	12:30 p.m. EST, ABC; 8/30/71 – 3/17/72	Succeeded by Split Second
Preceded by That Girl	12:00 p.m. EST, ABC; 3/20/72 – 6/27/75	Succeeded by Showoffs
