= Bern Bennett =

American radio and television announcer (1921–2014)

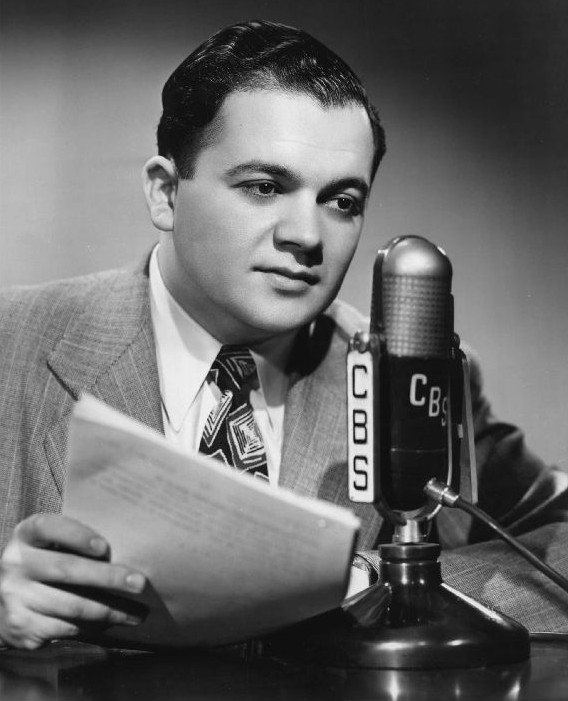
- Bennett in 1946.
- Born: October 19, 1921
- Died: May 29, 2014 (aged 92); San Pedro, California
- Occupation: Radio/television announcer
- Years active: 1944–2003

Bern Bennett (October 19, 1921 – May 29, 2014) was an American radio and television announcer.

== Career ==
For nearly sixty years, beginning in 1944, Bennett was a staff announcer at CBS Radio and television. In the 1940s and 1950s, he was closely associated with Bud Collyer, as announcer on three Collyer-hosted game shows, Winner Take All, Beat the Clock, and To Tell the Truth, all produced by Mark Goodson and Bill Todman.

Other radio programs for which Bennett was the announcer included This Is Broadway, School of the Air and Breakfast With Burrows. In 1960, he was host of Upbeat Saturday Night, a 30-minute program featuring live jazz music on CBS radio.

Other television programs for which Bennett was the announcer included By Popular Demand, The Jonathan Winters Show, Password, The Phil Silvers Show, and Your Surprise Store.

In 1957, Bennett was the subject of a contest on Beat the Clock in which viewers were asked to "Draw the Masked Announcer" (meaning draw what they thought Bennett looked like). Bennett, who was never seen on-camera, made an appearance with the winner, Edward Darnell of Columbus, Indiana, who had been flown to New York to be a contestant on Clock. Collyer often kidded Bennett about the tendency for his voice to break when introducing "America's number-one clock watcher... BUD COLLYER", and his voice breaking on the word "Collyer." Bennett was announcer on Clock until it moved from CBS to ABC in 1958. Bennett served as fill-in announcer on such shows as The Ed Sullivan Show (1948–1971) and What's My Line? (1950–1967).

In 1960, the network transferred Bennett to Los Angeles, where he was heard as announcer on such shows as The Danny Kaye Show, Your Surprise Package, the Tournament of Roses Parade, and, most notably, the soap operas The Young and the Restless and The Bold and the Beautiful. He also announced for the short-lived soap opera The Clear Horizon. In 1975, he subbed for a week on Match Game for its regular announcer Johnny Olson. He appeared on other networks: as the voice of a television announcer in an episode of The Flintstones (ABC) titled "Fred Flintstone: Before and After"; on The Facts of Life (NBC) in an on-camera appearance; and as a central character on the 1990 NBC version of To Tell the Truth.

Bennett died on May 29, 2014, at the age of 92 in San Pedro, Los Angeles. His death was not announced in the media until October.

== Sources ==
- Schwartz, David; Ryan, Steve; Wostbrock, Fred (1995). The Encyclopedia of TV Game Shows (2 ed.). Facts on File. ISBN 978-0-8160-3094-1.
