= King's Meadow Campus =

Former television production complex

Coordinates: 52°56′16.8″N 1°10′23.2″W

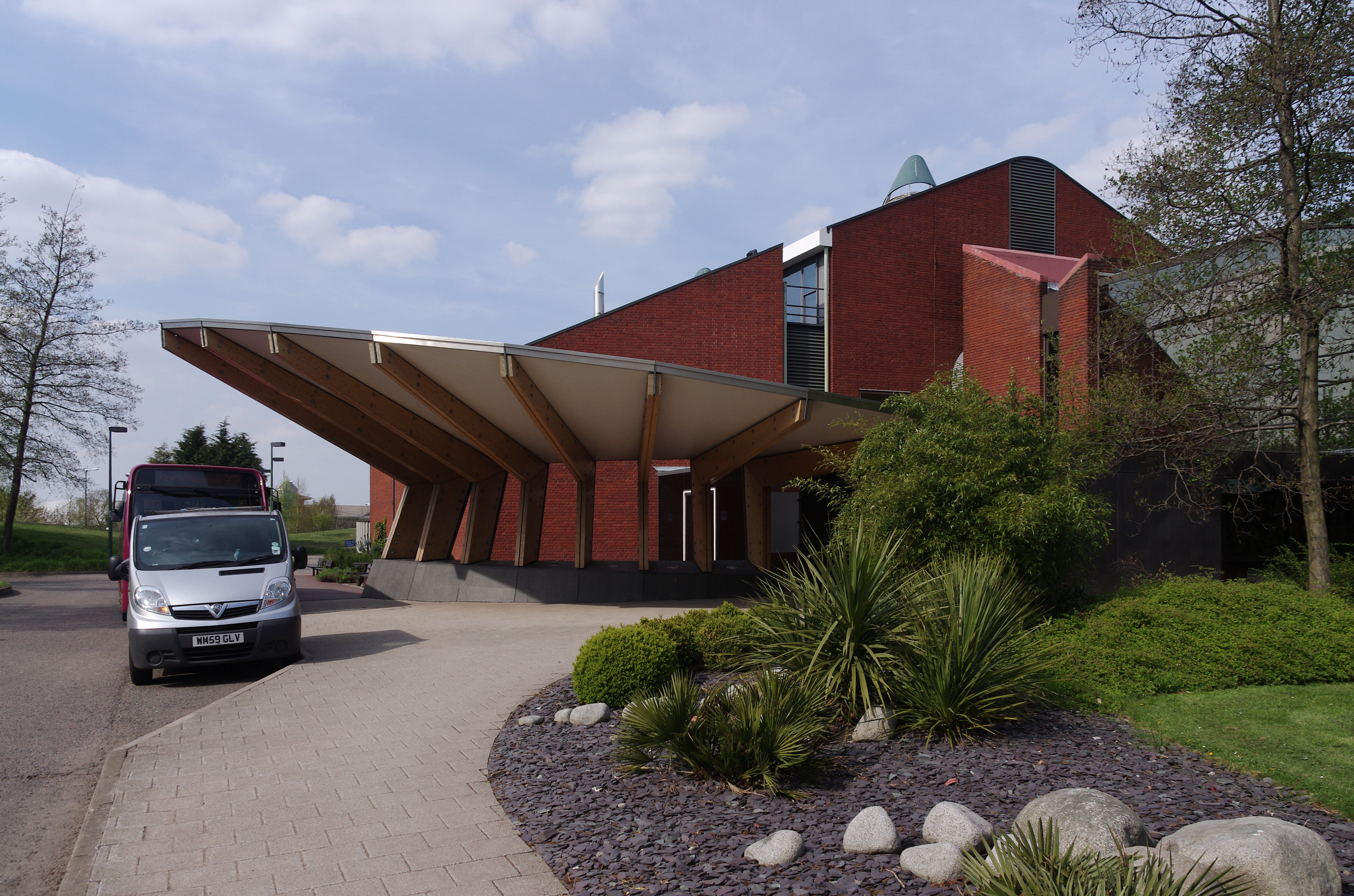
- Interactive map of the King's Meadow Campus area
- Former names: Lenton Lane Studios; East Midlands Television Centre; The Television House; Carlton Studios

General information
- Location: Lenton Lane, Nottingham, NG7 2NR, England
- Construction started: 1981
- Completed: September 1983
- Inaugurated: March 1984
- Renovated: 2005
- Owner: University of Nottingham

King's Meadow Campus is a university campus, which is part of the University of Nottingham, and is in Nottingham. From 1983 until 2005, the complex was an ITV studio complex called East Midlands Television Centre and later The Television House and Carlton Studios.

== History ==
As part of the agreement of the 1982 franchise being awarded to the broadcaster, Associated Television (ATV) agreed to restructure itself as Central Independent Television and provide separate television studios and news programme for the East Midlands region, a 17-acre site was bought in March 1981. While the complex was under construction, a temporary studio was set up in Giltbrook although this was never used because of industrial action at the time. The cost of the build (called the East Midland Television Centre) was £21 million. The foundation stone was laid by Lord Thomson, the chair of the Independent Broadcasting Authority (IBA), on 23 February 1982.

Central Independent Television began operation in the complex in September 1983, but was officially opened by the Duke of Edinburgh, Prince Philip in March 1984. It was designed to be spacious and provide the facility to extend if so required – and provide adequate floor-space for the major production work that was once carried out at Elstree Centre, as well as provide additional small presentation studios, plus a new permanent base for Central News East.

Originally there were three studios. The first one to be completed was first used on 4 November 1983. The other two were completed by 1 January 1984, just over two months before the official opening by Prince Philip, Duke of Edinburgh on 2 March 1984. Although the site covered 17 acres, the actual studio buildings only covered five acres. At its peak, the studio employed 600 staff.

It was decided to maintain continuity with its operations in Birmingham, (Studio 1–4 were in Broad Street) which resulted in the Nottingham Studios being numbered 5–10.

- Studio Five, used for local news bulletins (not the main programme) and in-vision continuity when that still existed.
- Studio Six was a medium-sized studio with an audience capacity of 100.
- Studios Seven and Eight were the two biggest studios. They each had an audience capacity of 500. These two studios covered 10,000 square feet each.
- Studio Nine, was used for Central News
- Studio Ten (added in the 1990s)

The studio complex featured a music recording studio, a small continuity announcement studio, and four electronic-news-gathering suites. A post-production area that was the first in the country to contain computer-based video editing suites. A sound department with 24-track recording and multiple cartridge machine. In 1994, Central Independent Television, along with the studios were taken over by Carlton Television.

From 1996, a section of the prop store was converted to make way for the programme library, which had recently moved over from Birmingham. This area eventually took up a total of three floors – one section dedicated to News material and the two remaining spaces allocated to network programme material.

By 2000, yet more alterations at the Studios were made to accommodate what was to be the final major ITV production from the studios: the revived version of Crossroads, which went on air in March 2001 and ran until May 2003. The show used the exterior of the Carlton Studios, by having a purpose-built canopy constructed, a pond and also extra landscaping which doubled as motel exteriors. Inside, the music studio was the first to go, along with a small portion of the props store – that in the end was converted into extra studio space for additional bedrooms and suites for the show.

By 2003, all production work at the studios was dwindling as ITV was undergoing major changes. Some floor space was hired out to the BBC on odd occasions. But ITV had decided to wind down operations and sell the complex, which created controversy amongst the 200 strong workforce at the studio, the Journalists Union the NUJ, and 27 local MPs who signed a petition to keep the studios open.

The idea was to relocate the Central News – East operation to a new purpose-built office and studio in Chilwell, on the outskirts of Nottingham. This new office opened in February 2005 – named Terry Lloyd House after the ATV/Central/ITN Reporter who was killed while covering events in Iraq in 2003. This is only a regional office and Central News – East is broadcast from Birmingham.

In February 2004, ITV plc announced plans to close and sell the Lenton Lane production centre in Nottingham with over 350 jobs being axed in the process. Following the closure of the studios, a new news-gathering centre was established in the city, but production and transmission of Central News East moved to the Birmingham studio in spring 2005. It still maintains one studio (Studio 7), and this is rented out to television and film companies, generating income for the University.

Production and broadcasting of the East Midlands edition of Central News was moved to Gas Street Studios in Birmingham.

The complex was renamed "King's Meadow Campus" in 2005, and now houses the University of Nottingham's Manuscripts and Special Collections, which the university has been collecting since the early 1930s. The original staff canteen and most of the floor-space in the studios has been converted to office and lecture space. In 2007, the campus opened a fitness centre called "King's Meadow Campus Fitness Centre".

In June 2018, Heart Church began using Studio 7 for their Sunday services.

The university announced plans to sell the campus in February 2025.

== Productions ==
- A Word in Your Ear (1993–1995)
- Barbara (1995–2003)
- Beat the Nation (2004)
- Blockbusters (1984–1989, 1990–1995)
- Bob's Your Uncle (1991–1992)
- Body Heat (1994–1996)
- Bullseye (1990–1995)
- Bunny and the Bull (2009)
- Catchphrase (1994–2002)
- Celebrity Squares (1993–1995)
- Control (2007)
- Crazy Cottage (1996–1998)
- Crossroads (2001–2003)
- Doctors and Nurses (2004)
- Family Fortunes (1990–2002)
- Freddie Starr (1993–1994)
- Goal III: Taking on the World (2009)
- Harry's Mad (1993–1996)
- Jeopardy! (1995–1996)
- Kiss Me Kate (1998–2000)
- Mad for It (1998–2000)
- Midas Touch (1995–1996)
- Married for Life (1996)
- Outside Edge (1994–1996)
- Pot of Gold (1993–1995)
- The Price Is Right (1984–1988)
- Q-Asia (1996–1999)
- Spitting Image (1985–1996)
- Supermarket Sweep (1993–2001)
- Turner Round the World (1997)
- The Upper Hand (1990–1996)
- Wise Up (1995–2000)

== See also ==
- Campuses of the University of Nottingham
