= The Krypton Factor =

British TV game show (1977–1995, 2009–2010)

- The Krypton Factor logo from 2009 until 2010
- Genre: Game show
- Created by: Jeremy Fox
- Presented by: Gordon Burns; Penny Smith; Ross King (Young Krypton); Ben Shephard
- Announcer: Charles Foster
- Country of origin: United Kingdom
- Original language: English
- No. of series: 18 (Original); 2 (Revival); 2 (Young Krypton)
- No. of episodes: 254 (inc. 21 specials) (Original); 20 (Revival); 21 (Young Krypton)

Production
- Production locations: Granada Studios (1977–1995, 2009); The London Studios (2010)
- Running time: 30 minutes (inc. adverts)
- Production company: ITV Studios

Original release
- Network: ITV
- Release: 7 September 1977 – 25 November 1995
- Release: 1 January 2009 – 9 March 2010

Related
- Britain's Best Brain; Britain's Brightest Family

The Krypton Factor is a British game show produced by Granada Television for broadcast on ITV. The show originally ran from 7 September 1977 to 20 November 1995 and was hosted by Gordon Burns.

Contestants across the United Kingdom and Ireland competed in rounds that tested their physical stamina and mental attributes. The show's title refers to Superman's home planet, Krypton, the title perceiving that the contestants had strong superhuman "powers" for participating in the challenges they were set. From 1986 onwards, the contestants all had their corresponding colours: red, green, yellow, or blue. The points contestants earned through the game were referred to as their "Krypton Factor", e.g. "The winner, with a Krypton Factor of 46, is the technical specialist from Birmingham, Caroline White". The 1987 series won the prestigious Premios Ondas – Spanish Television Award for Entertainment.

The show was revived for two series aired in 2009 and 2010, presented by Ben Shephard.

== History ==
=== Original series ===
The show's first series was shown on Wednesdays, presented by Gordon Burns and ran for eleven weeks, consisting of eight heats, two semi-finals and the final. It was then on Fridays for two years before arriving on Mondays in 1980, where it would be a staple of Monday evening schedules until its 18th and final series in 1995. In the first few series, there were no groups and eight heats, the winner of each advancing to a semi-final. The top two of each semi-final qualified for the Grand Final.

From 1981 to 1985, each series had twelve heats, from which each winner, along with the top four runners-up, progressed to the four semi-finals, the winners of which competed in the Grand Final. In 1986 and 1987, the series was divided into four groups (A, B, C, and D). Each group consisted of three heats, with the winner of each heat and the highest-scoring runner-up of the heats within a group making it to the group final. The winner of each group final would qualify for the grand final. From 1988 to 1995, the series had 13 episodes and only three groups (A, B, and C). The highest-scoring runner-up from the group finals would then go to the Grand Final.

In 2009 and 2010, each series had seven heats and the winners of which, in addition to the highest runner-up of the heats, would qualify for the two semi-finals, the winners of which, in addition to the top two overall runners-up, advanced to the Grand Final. The overall winner of the Grand Final would receive a bronze trophy and would traditionally be titled Superperson of the Year. Unusually and possibly uniquely for the time, until 1993, the series had no advert break in the middle even though it was on ITV in a primetime 7.00 pm slot. This explains why some of the elements (most notably, the time for the quiz) were shortened in later series.

In the 1991 series, for two weeks in a row, contestants Tony Hetherington and Paul Evans won all of the first five rounds in their heats, scoring 50 points; in addition, Hetherington set a record of 62 points. They later met in the same Group Final, where Evans won, and Hetherington qualified as the Best-Scoring Runner-up and went on to win the Grand Final.

In 1995, the show was heavily revamped, including the addition of co-host Penny Smith. In that series, the intelligence round was dropped, the first round being physical ability, with the rules in each round changing dramatically, except for general knowledge. The show's second half was a "super round", which included a 3D maze, code cracking and a race up Mount Krypton, with accumulated points being exchanged for equipment to assist the contestants with the challenge. While some viewers liked the changes, others felt that scrapping the Intelligence round was a sign of dumbing down and that dramatically changing the format was a mistake.

=== Revival ===
Since its cancellation in 1995, there were persistent rumours of a revival on the BBC. In April 2005, it was widely reported that the BBC would advance with a revival. However, the source of this story turned out to be a misinterpretation of comments by Wayne Garvie, head of BBC's Entertainment Group (and previously the last producer on The Krypton Factor), naming it as the next "TV gem" that "should" (rather than would) be revived.

On 24 September 2008, Broadcast reported that ITV was expected to commission a new series within weeks. As part of their wider Business Brains campaign, The Sage Group funded the show's return, and in November, it was confirmed that Ben Shephard would host it. The first episode was shown on Thursday, 1 January 2009, at 7.30 pm and ran for ten consecutive weeks. The new series is based on the original five-round format of the show, with every round being "brought bang up-to-date" and featuring "state-of-the-art" technology. However, The Guardian described the rounds as having "irritating bleeping noises and confusing graphics". The series was recorded at Granada Studios in Manchester from 7–10 December 2008. It was filmed in London for the 2010 series, which used a four-round format, as the Intelligence round was dropped again.

Critical reception to the revival was poor, with UKGameshows stating, "It's hard to think of anything they've done differently this time where the change is an improvement" The Guardian ultimately describes it as "like getting back together with an ex (drunkenly, on New Year's Eve). And then sobering up quickly and realising why you split up in the first place." The launch episode of the revival was watched by only half as many viewers as a repeat of Wallace and Gromit: A Matter of Loaf and Death.

== Rounds ==
The rounds were usually in the same order as below during the original series, except for the 1995 series. However, there were only five rounds in the earlier series, as Response had yet to be introduced; this round was also dropped for the 2009 revival.

In all rounds except the final round, 10 points were awarded to the winner, then 6 (8 in early series), 4 and 2 to the remaining contestants. Up to and including 1990, in the event of a tie in certain rounds, all tied players would receive the score for the higher place – in an extreme case, if three contestants tied with the highest score, they would all receive 10 points, with just 2 points for the unlucky fourth contestant. From 1991, in the Mental Agility and Observation rounds, tied players were ranked on the speed in which they answered; the faster player(s) being awarded the higher amount of points. On rare occasions, an observation round would have the players answer a five-part question, such as "Name the five continuity errors in the film clip," players would receive 2 points for each correct answer.

From 1986 to 1991, each round was introduced by the distinctive K logo, which would morph into a symbol for the round. A similar version of this was used in the 2009 revival.

=== Personality (1977) ===
This round only occurred in the first series, where it was third. In it, the contestants were sequestered, where they had to write a 30-second script on a subject given to them, like a destination brochure, a letter of complaint, etc., which they had one chance to perform. The performances were filmed, and a focus group in twenty cities and towns across Great Britain voted on the best effort.

=== Mental agility (1978–1995, 2009–2010) ===
First played in the second series, this often took the form of a memory test (though other versions would require mental computation of time and date differences or to add up a sequence of numbers and return the number which, when added to that sum, gave a pre-determined answer). The contestants frequently had to memorise a sequence and then answer progressively more complicated questions. For instance, if the sequence to be memorised was a series of coloured blocks, the questions might start as "What is the colour of the third block from the left?" and progress to "What is the colour of the block two to the left of the block to the right of the green block?". Other forms of memory tests might require contestants to remember a phrase or proverb and answer a series of questions about it (e.g. "What was the fifth letter of the fourth word?" or "Spell the last word backwards").

Initially, the round consisted of a "knock-out" format, where contestants were asked increasingly difficult questions and eliminated for wrong answers. If two or more players were eliminated on the same turn, ties were broken based on who had answered most of their questions correctly. Later, the contestants were shown 9 images along with a statement read to them by Charles Foster, and the contestants had to pick which 4 images were correct; they scored 2 points for each correctly identified image, with a maximum of 10 points for all four. In the semi-finals and final, this would change to showing two sequences in turn and asking each player a 3-point question about each sequence. A third sequence was then shown to all players at once, and one toss-up question, worth four points, was open to all players on the buzzer. If a player jumped in with the incorrect answer, that player was not penalized, and any other player could jump in. In 1985, in the heats each player was asked three questions worth 3, 3 and 4 points respectively. Then, until 1987, the Mental Agility round alternated between the knock-out format (without tiebreaks) and a 45 or 50-second "speed test" where each player had to come up with as many correct answers as possible before time expired and could pass on any of them. Only if they answered incorrectly would they be informed of it, possibly to discourage guesswork.

From 1988 onwards, the Mental Agility round consisted entirely of 40-second speed tests, and from 1991 to 1993, ties were broken by the time each player took to achieve their score. In the 1995 series, a set of four images (such as numbers, letters, or dates) were shown to the players, who were all read a statement about one or two of the images, and the contestants had to touch the correct image(s) on their screen. The monitors were placed on a rotating turntable to increase the difficulty of being the first to answer. This round lasted two minutes, with the images changing every eight questions. Only the first player to provide a correct answer would score for that answer, with answering time used to break ties.

This round was conducted initially with all contestants wearing headphones to prevent the other participants from hearing their competitors' answers. However, in the 1991 series, each contestant came on individually to perform their test in front of the audience before sitting down in their respective places behind them; no headphones were worn. By the end of the round, all 4 contestants would be seated. In the 2009 revival, the Mental Agility round followed the 1988 format, only using the tiebreaker rules when there was a tie for first place. Contestants individually completed this round in an isolation booth referred to as "The Kube", and their heart rates were also measured while they took the test. Each contestant's time was increased from 40 to 45 seconds for the 2010 version, and the tiebreak rule from 1991 returned.

=== Response (1986–1995) ===
New producer Geoff Moore introduced the Response round for the 1986 and 1987 series. In 1987, the Response round in the initial heats was a combination of a race between the contestants using double-odometer bicycles and a video wall which would display random numbers of coloured blocks; the contestants were required to press one of four coloured buttons corresponding to the highest number of blocks of any one colour being displayed. This alternated with a test in which the contestants had to walk a balance beam to the first challenge - placing coloured wooden blocks into frames on either side of them, swinging from side to side (this was known as the Fleischmann Flexibility Tests). They then had to run across a balance beam linked to the Minnesota Manual Dexterity Test, where they had to take a shape and place it into a corresponding space. After a final balance beam, they jump onto their respective mat to finish the race. The 1986 series consisted of the contestants competing in twos to perform first the Minnesota Manual Dexterity test (moving differently coloured cylinders from one side to the other), then running over to perform the Fleischmann Flexibility Test and then the final test, which involved hitting the relevant button whenever a colour flashed up on the screen (only one colour at a time in this case).

The Group and Grand Finals in the 1986 and 1987 series consisted of each player taking turns on a flight simulator and being marked by an actual flight instructor. From 1988 onwards, the Response round consisted entirely of flight simulator tests. In 1988, the contestants had to land a BAe 146 in the heats, a Harrier jump jet in the Group Finals and a Sea King on an aircraft carrier in the Grand Final (recorded at Culdrose Navy base in Helston, Cornwall). In 1989, the heats used three different simulators. The first heat in each group required the contestants to land Concorde, the second required the contestants to land a Red Arrow, and the third required them to land a Boeing 737. The group finals required the contestants to land the Sea King on an aircraft carrier. The Grand Final of the 1989 series saw the contestants use a Space Shuttle simulator in California.

In 1990, the contestants landed Concorde in the heats, the Sea King on an aircraft carrier in the group final, and in the Grand Final, the contestants were in the Sea King again, but this time they used the simulator in a rescue mission. They started from an oil rig (carrying an injured passenger) and had to take off from the oil rig and land on the aircraft carrier. From 1991 to 1993, the heats and group finals were the same; Boeing 737 was in the heats, and the Sea King was in the group finals. The 1991 Grand Final involved the contestants using a Nimrod simulator in a refuelling mission involving a Hercules aircraft. The 1992 and 1993 grand finals required the contestants to land a real plane. In 1995, all tests involved the Red Arrows flight simulator, and the simulator scored each player automatically, with losses based on their overall flight time before either crashing or losing contact with the lead plane for too long. The 2009 revival of the show did not include this round.

=== Observation (1977–1995, 2009–2010) ===
This round often involved watching a specially made clip being broadcast then, with an edited-together clip from a feature film or a television programme that was out in that particular year. In the earliest series, contestants were each asked three two-point questions (the first was an either-or question, the second was visual, and the third pertained to dialogue) on the clip in turn, followed by an identity parade where they were shown nine similar-looking actors, one of whom appeared in the clip. Each player who identified the correct actor earned four points. This was later changed so that each contestant was asked two two-point questions in turn, followed by four one-point toss-up questions open to all players with no penalty for a wrong answer, and the identity parade was worth two points.

From 1986 to 1988, contestants were shown a clip twice and asked to spot five differences between two similar clips (six differences in 1988), and in 1986 and 1987, each player earned two points for each correctly identified difference. Many of the sequences recorded for the 1988 series were written by and featured Andrew O'Connor and his Copy Cats castmate Jessica Martin. From the 1989 and 1990 series, contestants were invited to spot six deliberate continuity errors (five in the 1990 series) contained in one clip. In some of his earliest television appearances, Steve Coogan starred in many of the sequences featured in the 1989 series. From 1991 to 1993, contestants answered six multiple-choice questions (five in the 1993 series) relating to the clip (e.g. "What did he say when he entered the room?" or "What was on the table?"), and the time used to provide the correct answers was used to break ties.

Sometimes, original serials specially produced for the show were used, such as 1990's Sam Smith: Private Detective (starring Gwyneth Strong), which saw the female detective investigating rather silly cases (which often featured her young chubby nephew, Wallace). Some guests in then Sam Smith stories included Derek Griffiths, Matthew Kelly and Keith Chegwin, who all appeared in the series' final instalment. The 1991 series featured the saga Where is Don Day? Starring Tony Robinson and Michelle Collins, it is about a bank manager whose dull life is suddenly changed when he accidentally becomes involved in a robbery from his bank. 1992 saw Dead Ringer, starring Tony Slattery, a thriller about a man suffering from amnesia trying to discover who he is whilst being hunted down by a hitman named Preston, played by Roger Lloyd-Pack. In 1993, the round featured Roy Barraclough and Annabel Giles in a collection of investigative police stories, with Barraclough playing a retired police detective.

In 1995, short computer-animated segments commissioned from Bournemouth University's Department of Media Production were used for the test, and only five questions were asked. As with the Mental Agility round, answers were provided via touch screen monitors and placed on a rotating turntable, with Penny walking around the turntable and asking the questions.

In the 2009 revival, a classic clip from a TV programme is shown, after which each contestant was asked one individual question, and then four further questions were asked on the buzzer. If a player answers incorrectly, one more player can buzz in, but there are no penalties for a wrong answer. Contestants are ranked on how many correct answers, and if two or more players are tied, they each receive the same number of points. The exception is when there is a tie for the most correct answers. In this case, an extra question is asked to break the tie. In the 2010 version, each player is asked two questions in turn, and the contestants are awarded two points for a correct answer; however, like General Knowledge, one point is deducted for a wrong answer, and the next player jumps in and has a chance to steal. The point totals for this round are then used to rank each player.

=== Physical ability (1977–1995, 2009–2010) ===
In the original series, this pre-recorded segment involved the contestants racing to complete an army assault course at Holcombe Moor in Bury. This round typically included 20 obstacles, including vertical and flat cargo nets, rope swings, water jumps, Burma rope bridges, and a slide into the water. Gordon Burns stated in some episodes that the contestants trained for the assault course in the physical ability round for up to five weeks in advance. In the first series, the assault course was done as an athletics track type, with all of the contestants starting at the same time from different starting points, handicapped by age and sex. The second series featured the more recognised assault course but didn't feature the aerial slide until the early 1980s; instead, the contestants would jump from a high platform onto a mat below to end their run of the course.

In this round, female contestants were allowed a head start over their male competitors, and in the early series, contestants were given staggered starts to the assault course; following practice sessions with army personnel, the contestant of the weakest physical ability would set off first. The physical ability criteria were established from a simple formula derived from the age and gender of the contestant. In 1980, this typically meant two seconds per year of age difference and a 40-second advantage for female competitors. In the 1980 semi-final, the youngest competitor, Ted Stockton (a taxi driver, aged 25), started 56 seconds after the only female semi-finalist, who was 33. The age-based calculation was abolished in 1988. In 1995, the Physical Ability round was moved to the start of the show as the first round, and all contestants started simultaneously and were ranked according to how far ahead each had come of an individual "par time" based on age and sex.

The 1990 series saw many of the metal obstacles on the course replaced by wooden substitutes, including a wooden S-bend frame contestants had to descend. In the first episode of the 1978 series, one female contestant (Diane Lindsay) injured her arm while practising for the long drop at the end of the course, but later ran and completed the course and was found to have broken her arm in the practice run. Another female contestant (Judith Stafford) in 1989 broke her ankle after landing badly on one of the obstacles (near the end of the course) but managed to complete the rest of the course and finish in third place. Another female contestant (this time in 1987), Sue Dandy, completed the course despite having torn ligaments in her leg while coming out of a narrow, upward-sloping tunnel. (In 1982, a male contestant cut his forehead on this obstacle.) A male contestant (Paul Evans) in 1991 who fell from the top of the A-frame net managed to not only complete the course but win the round despite suffering from shock due to his fall. Another male contestant (Jackie Harte), this time in 1992, broke the safety rules when he went down the aerial slide without placing his feet in the water. Another male contestant (Jon Johnson), this time in 1993, fell off the Burma rope bridge towards the end of the course, but luckily, he landed in the net below and was able to finish in second place. For at least some series (around 1986–88), the fastest man and fastest woman on the assault course received a special trophy. Winners include Barbara Murray and Stuart Worthington (1986), Marian Chanter and Ted Daszkiewicz (1987), and Elizabeth Hayward and Alan Robbie (1988).

The 2009 revival used a new assault course, which only had room for two contestants at a time. The time it took each contestant to complete the course was recorded and revealed when the central part of the show was recorded. Female contestants had 45 seconds deducted from their time. The assault course was again changed for the 2010 version, with all four contestants competing simultaneously.

=== Intelligence (1977–1993, 2009) ===
A two or three-dimensional puzzle where shapes had to be put together to fill a rectangular grid or make a bigger shape was the basis for this round. Dr Gerry Wickham of the University of Manchester's School of Mathematics devised most of these. As the contestants performed the task, presenter Gordon Burns provided commentary to viewers at home on the contestants' progress and advice on how to solve the puzzle. The contestants do not see beforehand what the completed puzzle should look like. In the first series, this round was first, and tests varied, often taking the form of what would later be Mental Agility tests.

If a contestant is injured and unable to participate physically in this round (as happened to Diane Lindsay in the first episode of the 1978 series), an assistant may be brought in to complete the task under the contestant's instructions. However, the assistant may refrain from speaking back or interfering with the task.

It is reputed that some of the intelligence tests featured took contestants hours to solve, with edited highlights of their performance in the round shown on the programme. At least one contestant was moved to tears by the difficulty of the puzzles. In 1990, Burns told contestants that over the years, some of the tests had taken 15 or 20 minutes to complete, but that in one programme in the 1980 series, when the competitors' tables had been placed too close together for this round, two competitors accidentally picked up pieces from each other's table, making it impossible to complete the puzzle. Nearly an hour had passed as they vainly attempted to finish before the problem was realised. This round was eliminated from the 1995 series.

In the early series, as well as the 2009 revival, a time limit was placed for completion, and after the time ran out, the contestants who still needed to finish were ranked according to the progress they had made on the puzzle. This round was removed (again) in the 2010 series.

=== General knowledge (1977–1995, 2009–2010) ===
A quick-fire question round with a varied time limit (which depended on the year), and only one player could answer each question. For most of the run, this final round was conducted in darkness using a side shot of the four contestants lit in profile – when a contestant buzzed in, the remaining three players' spotlights would go out. A feature of this round was that, as each question was answered, the next question contained either the answer to the last question, a word from the last answer, or a word that sounded like it. Initially, players were asked as many toss-up questions as time allowed, with two points added for a correct answer and two points deducted for an incorrect response or none at all (+/- 1 in the first series).

Later, the round was in two stages: the first stage had the contestants answering three general knowledge questions, each from the same set of categories with 2 points for each correct answer, then it was on to stage 2, which was the quick-fire stage, which lasted 90 seconds, with each question worth +/- 1. Starting in 1986, the round consisted solely of a quick-fire round. Until 1987, the round lasted 100 seconds, each question worth +/- 1. In 1988, the values changed to +/- 2 points, and the time was reduced to 90 seconds (100 in 1989 and 75 in 1993 and 1995). In 2009, the round lasted 70 seconds, and a correct answer was worth two points, while an incorrect answer cost one point. In the 2010 series, time was increased from 70 seconds to 90 seconds. The player with the highest Krypton Factor won the game, and in the event of a tie, the tied players were asked further questions until the tie was broken.

=== Super Round (1995) ===
In 1995, the game was decided by a "Super Round," a race encompassing all previous rounds' abilities. At the start of the round, players were shown five coloured circles, each with a letter or number, and the players had to memorize the sequence before taking a zip line down 50 feet to the floor. They then entered the Kryptic Rings, a three-dimensional maze of interlocking rings with numbered and lettered junctions. Following and correctly interpreting the sequence (following the circles clockwise, starting with the circle of their colour) would lead each player to their correct exit. Each exit was marked with a letter, which they would memorize on their way to the next part of the race, the Laser Matrix, preceded by a computer where each player had to log in by hitting the letter critically matching their exit. Each player then had to type in four words with a common thread. However, each key corresponds to a different letter according to a code (such as each key giving the preceding letter).

After cracking the code and typing in the four words, each player had to cross a corridor of shifting laser beams, where breaking each beam resulted in a seven-second penalty. Once out, the players entered the Response Revolve, a rotating cylinder where each had to collect six batons of their colour from their holds; however, each baton could only be removed when a light by the baton flashed, and all lights flashed according to a sequence. Once all six batons were out and placed in the player's pedestal, each player had to run to the Krypton Mountain, where they first had to build a four-piece ladder, which they ascended before making a vertical climb up the Krypton Mountain, completing the race by grabbing a letter K of their colour at the top of the Krypton Mountain.

The players started at the same time and place and used their points from the first five rounds to buy advantages, such as directional arrows in the Rings, completed words at the computer (in Heat 2 of Group C, an easier path through the Laser Matrix), batons already removed from the Response Revolve, or ladder pieces already built. The value of each advantage varied with the heats, group finals, and finals. The player who won the Super Round won the game, and completion time was used to determine who held the wild card spot.

The Super Round was also notable for a few incidents regarding cheating; in Group B, two contestants (both wearing yellow) were disqualified for unknowingly breaking the rules of the Super Round. Heat 1 contestant Simon Evans was disqualified as he had prematurely proceeded from the Laser Matrix computer having mistakenly thought he completed all four words when he hadn't (he produced a "j" instead of an "h" in the third word; Penny told him about his disqualification at the top of the Krypton Mountain) where he replied he felt 'As sick as a parrot' and in Heat 2 the following week, contestant Alison Riley was disqualified as she had forcibly pulled out batons from the Response Revolve when their adjacent lights weren't flashing and unlike Evans, she was edited out of the remainder of the round after she had begun her ascent on the ladder and a replay was shown of her illegal move. As a result of their actions, Simon Evans and Alison Riley were the only contestants in Krypton Factor history to be disqualified.

== Young Krypton ==
A spin-off series, Young Krypton, was produced for children and was presented by Ross King. The series was based on a similar structure to the adult version but with simpler intelligence tasks and a shorter obstacle course (located at The American Adventure Theme Park near Nottingham, owned by the Granada Group at the time) in place of the Physical Ability round.

The 1988 series, which had only five rounds (Mental Agility, Response, Observation, Physical Ability and General Knowledge, with Intelligence in place of Response in the Group and Grand Finals), followed the tournament format of the regular series, while the 1989 series, which only ran 8 episodes, consisted of five heats, two semi-finals, and the Grand Final. The five heat winners plus the three highest runners-up advanced to the semis, the winners of which qualified for the Grand Final, along with the top two runners-up from both matches.

At the end of both series, Gordon Burns appeared to present the trophy to the winner. Also, in the 1988 Grand Final, Ross King presented a special trophy to Phillip Westwick, who completed the adventure course in the fastest time.

== Special episodes ==
The Krypton Factor had several Champion of Champions episodes; the first edition aired on 22 December 1980, featuring the winners of the first four series, which was won by Philip Bradley (1980) and Ian Botham presented the trophy. This was followed by another Champion of Champions edition of the show on 22 July 1985, featuring the winners from the previous four years: John McAllister (1981), John Webley (1982), Chris Topham (1983) and Paul Smith (1984), with McAllister winning the game and trophy. The next Champion of Champions episode aired on 27 March 1989, featuring four-star contestants: Marian Chanter and Alison Heath (1987), David Lee (1988) and Andrew Gillam (1985). Alison Heath won this match.

In 1978, an Explorers Special was broadcast in the United Kingdom. This featured Chris Bonington, Robin Knox-Johnston, Ranulph Fiennes and Don Cameron. This show is where Chris Bonnington and Robin Knox-Johnston first met. The episode was won by Chris Bonington, but he recounts coming third behind Sir Ranulph Fiennes and Robin Knox-Johnston in the assault course round.

On 28 March 1988, an International special was broadcast in the United Kingdom, Australia and New Zealand as part of Australia's bi-centennial celebrations. Made in the UK and presented by Gordon Burns, the episode featured Marian Chanter and Alison Heath, winner and runner-up respectively of the UK Krypton Factor Grand Final 1987 and John Cargill and Christopher Connolly, winner and runner-up respectively of the Australia & New Zealand Krypton Factor 1987 final. Alison Heath won the International title, and Fatima Whitbread presented the trophy.

== Theme tune ==
Four theme tunes for the programme were used during the original series of The Krypton Factor. The first two theme tunes (the first from 1977 to 1982, and the second from 1983 to 1985) were written by Mike Moran. British electronica band, The Art of Noise, performed the theme tune between 1986 and 1993 and is perhaps the programme's best-known theme. It was written by band members Anne Dudley and J. J. Jeczalik. The exact version of this theme tune varied in some episodes/series. For example, the drum beats in the music in some episodes/series were more emphasised, as was the synthesizer melody, but generally, it remained the same. Mistakenly referred to as "Beat Box", the track which appeared on their debut album Who's Afraid of the Art of Noise? it is, in fact, an original composition and was reworked as "Crusoe" in 1987. A version of the Art of Noise theme, first heard in 1986, was released on the compilation album Influence in 2010. For the 1995 series, the theme tune was a reworked version of the 1986–93 theme tune but was performed by Dudley.

The music used during the scoring at the end of the Response round in 1988 was "Forgotten Town" by The Christians. In the 1989 series, "Left to My Own Devices" by the Pet Shop Boys was used.

Generally, during the opening title sequence, the contestants were introduced by former Granada Television continuity announcer Charles Foster.

The music to the 2009 revival was created by Paul Farrer. In their review, UKGameshows asked "can anyone actually remember the new theme "tune"?".

== Merchandise and commercial representations ==
The Krypton Factor had a number of clothing merchandise, including a pair of black trainers bearing the Krypton K on the sides and the tongue. A Krypton Factor sports bag, mug and tea towel were also produced. Although not mentioned on the air, all the contestants were given a Sports bag and some clothing with the Krypton Factor logo as gifts for appearing on the programme.

A computer game version of The Krypton Factor was published by TV Games and released in 1987 for the home computers of the era. A Krypton Factor Quizbook was published in 1989.

ITV released The Krypton Factor interactive DVD board game via their website in 2010, and then again in 2011. The DVD game is hosted by Ben Shephard.

Adrenalin in North Yorkshire markets itself as the home of the obstacle course from the TV series, which offers paying public a chance to take on the Assault course.

Demon Wheelers have developed a team-building event based around the rounds from The Krypton Factor TV series and incorporating an inflatable assault course.

There have also been several Krypton Factor tie-in books published.

== Other versions ==
The Krypton Factor was later exported to the United States. Two short-lived United States versions of The Krypton Factor aired. In 1981, Dick Clark hosted a 5-week summer series on ABC. In 1990, Willie Aames hosted a syndicated version for children. In 2000, a version hosted by Pat O'Brien and produced by Fox TV was never shown to the public. In 2015, another version in production for Syfy was also never shown to the public.

The New Zealand version of The Krypton Factor ran from 1987 to 1991 on TVNZ and TV2 and was hosted by veteran presenter Dougal Stevenson. There was no Response round in the New Zealand version, and the video clips used for the Observation test were taken from the United Kingdom version. The Physical Ability test was done at Burnham Military Camp, just south of Christchurch. The first season in 1987 consisted of a challenge between Australian and New Zealand contestants, with all of the series hosted in New Zealand and aired on ABC in Australia during that time. The winners of the 1987 series competed against the winners of the 1987 series in the United Kingdom. Reruns of The Krypton Factor were screened on TVNZ 6.

A German version of the show called Krypton Faktor, presented by Jörg Draeger aired in 1991, with 13 episodes shown on Sat.1 before the show was cancelled.

== Transmissions ==
=== Original ===
==== Series ====
| Series | Start date | End date | Episodes |
|---|---|---|---|
| 1 | 7 September 1977 | 16 November 1977 | 11 |
| 2 | 14 July 1978 | 29 September 1978 | 11 |
| 3 | 8 June 1979 | 11 November 1979 (Note: The second semi-final and grand final of the third series were originally scheduled to air on 10 and 17 August 1979, but they were rescheduled to 4 and 11 November 1979 due to the technicians' strike of 1979.) | 11 |
| 4 | 16 June 1980 | 25 August 1980 | 11 |
| 5 | 1 June 1981 | 21 September 1981 | 17 |
| 6 | 31 May 1982 | 27 September 1982 | 17 |
| 7 | 27 June 1983 | 17 October 1983 | 17 |
| 8 | 9 July 1984 | 29 October 1984 | 17 |
| 9 | 29 July 1985 | 18 November 1985 | 17 |
| 10 | 1 September 1986 | 22 December 1986 | 17 |
| 11 | 7 September 1987 | 28 December 1987 | 17 |
| 12 | 3 October 1988 | 26 December 1988 | 13 |
| 13 | 4 September 1989 | 27 November 1989 | 13 |
| 14 | 3 September 1990 | 26 November 1990 | 13 |
| 15 | 2 September 1991 | 25 November 1991 | 13 |
| 16 | 7 September 1992 | 30 November 1992 | 13 |
| 17 | 6 September 1993 | 29 November 1993 | 13 |
| 18 | 28 August 1995 | 20 November 1995 | 13 |

==== Specials ====
| Date | Entitle |
|---|---|
| 29 December 1978 | Christmas Special |
| 22 December 1980 | Champion of Champions |
| 29 December 1980 | World Champions Special |
| 22 December 1981 | Celebrity Special |
| 30 December 1981 | International Special (UK vs. USA) |
| 30 December 1982 | Celebrity Special |
| 3 January 1983 | International Special |
| 12 December 1983 | International Special |
| 19 December 1983 | Great Britons Special |
| 27 December 1984 | Olympic Special |
| 31 December 1984 | International Special |
| 22 July 1985 | Champion of Champions |
| 26 December 1985 | Christmas Special |
| 28 March 1988 | International Special (UK vs. Australasia) |
| 2 May 1988 | Celebrity Challenge |
| 19 September 1988 | Olympic Special (Part 1) |
| 26 September 1988 | Olympic Special (Part 2) |
| 2 January 1989 | Celebrity Challenge |
| 27 March 1989 | Champion of Champions |
| 1 January 1990 | Celebrity Special |
| 16 April 1990 | Celebrity Special |
| 26 December 1990 | Celebrity Special |

=== Revival ===
| Series | Start date | End date | Episodes |
|---|---|---|---|
| 1 | 1 January 2009 | 5 March 2009 | 10 |
| 2 | 5 January 2010 | 9 March 2010 | 10 |

=== Young Krypton ===
| Series | Start date | End date | Episodes |
|---|---|---|---|
| 1 | 6 June 1988 | 29 August 1988 | 13 |
| 2 | 23 May 1989 | 11 July 1989 | 8 |

== United Kingdom Superperson of the Year ==
This is a complete list of all winners (include one female and 19 male contestants) from 20 series of the show:

| Series | Year | Name |
|---|---|---|
| 1 | 1977 | Harry Evans |
| 2 | 1978 | Ken Wilmshurst |
| 3 | 1979 | Peter Richardson |
| 4 | 1980 | Philip Bradley |
| 5 | 1981 | John McAllister |
| 6 | 1982 | John Webley |
| 7 | 1983 | Chris Topham |
| 8 | 1984 | Paul Smith |
| 9 | 1985 | Andrew Gillam |
| 10 | 1986 | David Kemp |
| 11 | 1987 | Marian Chanter |
| 12 | 1988 | David Lee |
| 13 | 1989 | Mike Berry |
| 14 | 1990 | Duncan Heryett |
| 15 | 1991 | Tony Hetherington |
| 16 | 1992 | Andrew Craig |
| 17 | 1993 | Tim Richardson |
| 18 | 1995 | Andy Wilbur |
| 19 | 2009 | Aaron Bell |
| 20 | 2010 | Pete Thompson |
