= Gordon Burns =

Northern Irish journalist and broadcaster

- Born: Gordon Henry Burns; Belfast, Northern Ireland United Kingdom
- Education: Dulwich College
- Occupations: Broadcaster, journalist
- Years active: 1973–2013
- Notable credit(s): The Krypton Factor (1977–1995); North West Tonight (1997–2011)
- Spouse: Sheelagh Burns
- Children: 2
- Relatives: Ed Sheeran (second cousin)

Gordon Henry Burns is a Northern Irish retired journalist and broadcaster. He was the host of The Krypton Factor for its original 18-year run (1977–1995) and was the chief anchorman for the BBC regional news programme North West Tonight from January 1997 to October 2011. In November 2011, he moved back to Belfast where he was born.

Due to Burns' work commitments with Granada Television on programmes such as World in Action and Granada Reports and later BBC Manchester for North West Tonight, he resided in Manchester for over thirty years. He most recently hosted a Sunday morning radio show for BBC Radio Manchester and BBC Radio Lancashire.

== Early life ==
Burns was born in Wellington Park, in Belfast. When he was a child his family moved to Kent, where he attended the local primary school and then went to Dulwich College in London. The family then returned to live at Belfast's Belmont Road, where Burns attended Campbell College.

== Career ==
He began his journalism career working on the Belfast Telegraph and worked on BBC radio's long-running Sports Report before joining Ulster Television as a sports editor and programme producer in 1967. Two years later, Burns began presenting the nightly news programme UTV Reports, first as a stand-in for regular frontman David Mahlowe and later as a chief anchor, during the early stages of The Troubles. In 1973, Burns joined Granada Television to anchor their nightly news programme Granada Reports and to work on the station's current affairs output, including World in Action.

In September 1976 he presented an edition of Granada's Friday night football preview programme Kick Off, in which he was covering for the regular presenter Gerald Sinstadt.

Burns's national profile began with his association of ITV's game show The Krypton Factor which he presented for eighteen years from 1977 to 1995. He was the presenter of Password for Ulster Television, one of that company's few programmes to be shown throughout the ITV network and also hosted a Searchline segment in several series of LWT's Surprise Surprise. During the 1980s Burns also reported from the political party conferences for the ITV network, and presented the Channel 4 current affairs series Irish Angle. In the early 1990s he presented two parlour game shows for the BBC: A Word in Your Ear and Relatively Speaking.

From 1997 to 2011, Burns presented North West Tonight, alongside its shorter lunchtime version, North West Today. In 2007, Ranvir Singh joined as co-anchor of the previously single-headed main evening programme. Burns announced in April 2011 that he would be retiring from the role but would move on to present a Sunday morning show on BBC Radio Manchester and BBC Radio Lancashire in September 2011, with his last TV bulletin broadcast on 30 September.

He was the voice of "The Chain" feature and other features on the Radcliffe & Maconie show on BBC Radio 6 Music. He appeared as a guest on the show when The Chain reaches a significant milestone, for example, for the 5,000th (musically based) item on 3 March 2015 which was the single "Dancing Queen" by ABBA.

In 2013, Burns retired after stepping down from his radio show.

== Personal life ==
Burns is married to Sheelagh and has a daughter and a stepson from his wife's first marriage. He lives in Hale, Greater Manchester. He is the second cousin of English singer/songwriter Ed Sheeran.
