= David H. Greene =

American academic (1913–2008)

David Herbert Greene
- Born: 4 November 1913; Cambridge, Massachusetts, United States of America
- Died: 9 July 2008 (aged 94); Boynton Beach, Florida
- Occupations: Author, Teacher
- Spouse: Catherine Healy (m. 1939–2008)
- Writing career
- Genres: Irish Literature, Irish History
- Subject: Literature
- Notable works: J.M. Synge 1871-1909; 1000 Years of Irish Prose

David Herbert Greene (November 4, 1913 – July 9, 2008) was an author and professor at Harvard University, Boston University, The College of New Rochelle, the U.S. Naval Academy and New York University, where he was chairman of the English Department. He was the official biographer of the Irish playwright J.M. Synge and worked on the original version of the game show Password as a 'word authority'.

He was born in Cambridge, Massachusetts to Herbert Greene and Annie Roche. He graduated from Harvard University in 1936. He studied in Ireland on a Harvard Fellowship.

He married Catherine Healy in 1939. During World War II, David served as an officer with the United States Navy.

He died in Boynton Beach, Florida of pneumonia.
