= Password (British game show) =

British TV game show (since 1963)

- Genre: Panel game
- Created by: Bob Stewart
- Presented by: Shaw Taylor; Brian Redhead; Eleanor Summerfield; Esther Rantzen; Tom O'Connor; Brian Munn; Gordon Burns; Stephen Mangan
- Announcer: Simon Greenall (2024)
- Country of origin: United Kingdom
- Original language: English
- No. of series: 1 (ATV); 3 (BBC); 1 (Channel 4); 3 (UTV); 1 (revival)
- No. of episodes: 27 (ATV); 39 (BBC); 26 (Channel 4); 70 (UTV); 7 (revival)

Production
- Running time: 30 mins (1963–88); 45 minutes (2024)
- Production companies: ATV (1963); Thames in association with Talbot Television and Goodson-Todman Productions (1982–83); Ulster Television (1985–88); Talkback (2024–present)

Original release
- Network: ITV
- Release: 12 March – 10 September 1963
- Network: BBC2 (1973); BBC1 (1974–76)
- Release: 24 March 1973 – 3 January 1976
- Network: Channel 4
- Release: 6 November 1982 – 14 May 1983
- Network: Ulster (1985–87); ITV (1988)
- Release: 2 September 1985 – 29 July 1988
- Network: ITV1
- Release: 31 August 2024 – present

Related
- Password

Password is a British panel game show based on the U.S. version of the same name. It originally aired on ITV from 12 March to 10 September 1963 and was hosted by Shaw Taylor. Through its various revivals over the decades, Password achieved a rare broadcasting milestone by airing on all four of the UK's original terrestrial television networks.

== History ==
It was revived by BBC2 from 24 March to 28 April 1973, hosted by Brian Redhead, before moving to BBC1 from 7 January 1974 to 3 January 1976, first hosted by Eleanor Summerfield in 1974 and then hosted by Esther Rantzen from 1975 to 1976.

After another break from television, Channel 4 revived the format as a daytime programme from its launch on 6 November 1982 to 14 May 1983, hosted by Tom O'Connor; the series then moved to Ulster Television and was a broadcast regionally from 2 September 1985 to 13 March 1987, first hosted by Brian Munn in 1985, and then hosted by Gordon Burns from 1986 to 1987. It later transferred back to the national ITV network for a short run, from 20 June to 29 July 1988, also hosted by Burns.

In 2023, it was announced that ITV would be reviving the show with Stephen Mangan as host. The regular team captains were Alan Carr and Daisy May Cooper. In 2025, a second series was commissioned. After its first series aired late at night, following The Voice UK, in the autumn of 2024, ITV decided to retool the format so it would fit into a weekday pre-watershed timeslot and was expected to start airing in early 2026 but has subsequently been delayed until 2027. Carr and Cooper will not return for the second series due to scheduling conflicts and have been replaced by a rotating lineup of guest celebrities. This new half-hour slot opened up as part of ITV's major scheduling reshuffle.

== Gameplay ==
The gameplay is identical to the US version. Two celebrity-civilian teams compete, and after being given the password, the team in control has to decide whether to pass or play. Naming the password was worth 10 points minus one point for each additional clue. By the 1980s, teams only got three guesses each so that each password scored a minimum of five points. The first side to earn 25 points won the game, and celebrities switched partners after each game. On Channel 4, the first player to win two games continued as champion. In later series, teams played best-of-five matches.

On the Ulster series, after a team accumulated 25 points or more, the points were turned into cash, at £1 per point. The winning team then played the lightning round, where teams had to guess 5 passwords in 60 seconds. Each word earned the contestant an extra £5 per word or £50 if the team guessed all 5.

On the Channel 4 series, each player earned £2 per point and the first contestant to play two lightning rounds continued as champion. Winners of £500 retired until the semi-finals.

On the 2024 series, the first game would be played to 25 points. The second round featured a Super Password puzzle. The tiebreaker featured a puzzle on the buzzer. The first team to win two rounds played Alphabeticals for up to £10,000 won by identifying ten alphabetically arranged passwords within one minute. Otherwise, each password earned £500 which doubled if the player could guess one more password after only one clue word.

== Transmissions ==
=== ATV era ===
Series	Start date	End date	Episodes
1	12 March 1963	10 September 1963	27

=== BBC era ===
Series	Start date	End date	Episodes
1	24 March 1973	28 April 1973	6
2	7 January 1974	27 August 1974	27
3	29 December 1975	3 January 1976	6

=== Channel 4 era ===
Series	Start date	End date	Episodes
1	6 November 1982	14 May 1983	26

=== UTV era ===
Series	Start date	End date	Episodes
1	2 September 1985	15 November 1985	20
2	5 January 1987	13 March 1987	20
3	20 June 1988	29 July 1988	30

=== ITV era ===
Series	Start date	End date	Episodes
1	31 August 2024	12 October 2024	7
2	TBA 2027	TBA 2027	TBA
