= Safeword (disambiguation) =

A safeword is a code word or signal used to communicate personal states or limits regarding physical, emotional, or moral boundaries.

Safeword may also refer to:

- Safeword (game show), a British television comedy game
- "Safeword" (song), by Halsey, 2025
- "Safeword", a song from the album Who Really Cares by TV Girl
- "Safe Word" (song), by Brooke Candy
