= Million Dollar Password =

American television game show

- Genre: Game show
- Based on: Password by Bob Stewart
- Written by: Shawn Kennedy
- Directed by: Mark Gentile
- Presented by: Regis Philbin
- Theme music composer: Lewis Flinn
- Composer: Lewis Flinn
- Country of origin: United States
- Original language: English
- No. of seasons: 2
- No. of episodes: 12

Production
- Executive producers: Cecile Frot-Coutaz; Vin Rubino
- Producers: Chris Ahearn; Graham Shaw
- Production locations: Kaufman Astoria Studios (Season 1); Radford Studio Center (Season 2)
- Editors: Jason Williams; Eric Singer; Roger Ellinger; Jason Goldberg
- Camera setup: Multi-camera
- Running time: 41–43 minutes
- Production company: Fremantle

Original release
- Network: CBS
- Release: June 1, 2008 – June 14, 2009

Related
- Password; Password Plus; Super Password

Million Dollar Password is an updated version of the game show Password on CBS, which was hosted by Regis Philbin and ran from June 1, 2008, to June 14, 2009. FremantleMedia produced the program.

== Production and broadcast history ==
Million Dollar Password premiered June 1, 2008, at 8:00 p.m. Eastern. The initial order of the series consisted of six hour-long episodes, each comprising two games. These six episodes were taped in New York City's Kaufman Astoria Studios in March 2008. Repeats of the first season aired on Thursdays beginning June 26, 2008, moved to Sundays on August 3, 2008 and finished on August 24, 2008.

Season two, another six episodes, began on December 18, 2008, with a special Thursday broadcast. The show moved to its regular Sunday time slot three nights later. These games were taped on August 2–4, 2008, at CBS Radford studios in Los Angeles. On January 7, 2009, despite good ratings, CBS removed the last two episodes (one featuring Norm Macdonald and Jamie Kennedy scheduled for January 11, 2009 and another with Chelsea Handler and Jeff Garlin scheduled for January 25, 2009), along with a Season 1 repeat scheduled for January 18, 2009, from its schedule. The program returned to the schedule on May 24, 2009. Excluding June 7, 2009 for the broadcast of the 63rd Tony Awards, the network ran a mixture of unseen episodes and repeats of Season 1 and 2 episodes on Sundays until the beginning of July. The first four episodes, airing during the official 2008–09 television season, had an average viewership that made the show finish as the 42nd most-viewed program of that season.

Betty White became the first celebrity to play in all American television versions of Password with her appearance on the June 12, 2008, episode. The widow of Allen Ludden, who was the host of the original Password in its various incarnations from 1961 to 1980, she also appeared on December 28, 2008, and was the only celebrity to appear more than once during the show's run. Sande Stewart, the son of Password creator Bob Stewart, was a consultant for the show. Noted cruciverbalist Trip Payne acted as the show's "word expert".

On August 3, 2009, during the 2009 Television Critics Association Summer Press Tour, CBS Entertainment President Nina Tassler officially announced that there were no plans to renew the series; despite strong overall ratings, the show was most popular among a very old demographic that was not popular with advertisers.

GSN originally aired repeats of the series on Sunday nights in mid-2010, later putting the show additionally on weeknights for a few weeks more, until removing the show from the schedule completely. It was then re-added in a Saturday afternoon slot in January 2011. In June 2013, GSN removed the series from the schedule again.

In 2021, episodes of the series then aired on Buzzr.

The director of the show was Mark Gentile; he served as the director for the primetime version of Who Wants to Be a Millionaire? for its entire network run (between 1999 and 2002, which Philbin had also hosted) and was the consulting producer for the syndicated version's first two seasons before becoming the director of Duel (which aired between December 2007 and July 2008).

== Gameplay ==
This format of Password departs somewhat from its predecessors in terms of gameplay. The first half of the game is an elimination game featuring two contestants and two celebrity guests. The contestants alternate playing 30-second rounds in which they attempt to correctly identify as many as five given words with a celebrity partner using the traditional one-word clue method, like the Lightning Round. There is no limit on the number of clues for each word. Words can be passed on and returned to later if time permits.

The contestants are each paired with one of the celebrity partners for the first two rounds, and then switch partners for the next two rounds. The rounds alternate between the contestant giving and receiving clues, such that they give and receive once to each celebrity. After four rounds, the contestant who has correctly identified the most words moves on to the Million Dollar Password game. For the final round, the contestant who is trailing in score plays first. Their opponent does not need to play the final round if they are still leading after that, and otherwise has their round cut short as soon as they have passed his opponent's score. If the contestants are tied after four rounds, a tie-breaking word is given to both teams, starting with the winner of a coin-toss. The teams alternate giving clues and responses until one contestant gets the word and wins the game.

=== Million Dollar Password ===
Solved words to complete	Value if 5 words are solved
5 out of 10	$10,000
5 out of 9	$25,000 (guaranteed sum)
5 out of 8	$50,000
5 out of 7	$100,000
5 out of 6	$250,000 (guaranteed sum, season 2)
5 out of 5	$1,000,000 (jackpot prize)

The Million Dollar Password round had a six-step prize ladder with a top prize of $1,000,000. The contestant's partner in this round was the celebrity with whom the contestant earned more points in the elimination game, if the contestant earned the same number with both celebrities, their partner is the last celebrity the contestant played with. The contestant may choose to give or receive the clues for the entire round. For each step of the ladder, the clue giver must get their partner to say five given passwords within 90 seconds. For each word, the clue giver may give a maximum of three clues (similar to Cashword from Super Password). The giver may pass, but cannot return to a word, like the original "Lightning Round" of the classic Password.

Successful contestants may take their winnings and leave, or may attempt the next prize level. At each subsequent level the gameplay remains the same, but the number of available passwords is reduced by one. Failure to complete a level ends the game. A contestant who fails on the first two levels earns nothing. Failure on the $50,000, $100,000, or $250,000 levels means the contestant leaves with $25,000. Should a contestant clear the first five levels, s/he wins a guaranteed $250,000 and gets a free shot at the $1,000,000 top prize. (In season one, $250,000 was not a safety level).

If a contestant giving the clues clears the $100,000 level, they are shown the six (the first five in season one) passwords for the $250,000 level (and in season one, the five passwords at the $1,000,000 level) before making a decision.

=== Legal clues ===
Throughout the game, the giver must wait for a response before giving a new clue, and only one response may be given at a time. Breaking either rule forfeits the word. (The guesser may suggest the giver pass, but only the clue giver may officially do so). Antonyms are acceptable clues, but hyphenated clues and acronyms are not. Using more than one word, a "coined", foreign or otherwise unrecognized clue will also forfeit the word. As before, givers may use multiple words to form sentences and phrases, but must pause in (and wait for a response) between each word.

== International versions ==
=== France ===
An adaptation of the Million Dollar Password format was aired from January 10, 2009 to July 30, 2016 on France 2, where it is called 'Mot de passe' (French for "password"). The show is rebroadcast in Canada on TV5.

=== Indonesia ===
A version of Million Dollar Password called Password Jutawan ("Password Millionaire") aired originally on Global TV with Muhammad Farhan as host from 2008 to 2009.

=== Mexico ===
A version called Password: La palabra secreta ("Password: The secret word") produced by TV Azteca, airs Saturdays on Azteca 13.

=== Spain ===
A version based on the Million Dollar Password format has been adapted for their audience. The program, entitled Password, premiered on July 7, 2008. Hosted by Luján Argüelles, it is nearly identical to the 2008 Philbin version. The biggest differences include the top prize of €25,000 and changing the program to a forty-five-minute (with commercials) weekday broadcast.

Country	Local name	Host	Network	Prize	Premiere
Brazil	Mega Senha; Mega Senha Power	Marcelo de Carvalho; Luciana Gimenez (2010–2011)	RedeTV!	R$1,000,000	April 29, 2010 – October 18, 2016; September 15, 2018 – August 10, 2024
France	Mot de passe	Patrick Sabatier; Laurence Boccolini	France 2	€100,000 €50,000 €20,000	January 10, 2009 – July 30, 2016; August 31, 2020 – June 25, 2021
Greece	Password	Giorgos Tsalikis	Alpha TV	€100,000	2008
Indonesia	Password Jutawan	Muhammad Farhan	Global TV	Rp.200,000,000	August 23, 2008 – March 21, 2009
Mexico	Password: La palabra secreta	Rodrigo Murray (2010–2011); Rafael Araneda (2013)	TV Azteca	MX$250,000	May 8, 2010 – 2011; 2013
Slovakia	Heslo za milión	Tůma Filip	Markiza	Sk10,000,000	2008
Spain	Password	Luján Argüelles (2008–2010); Ana Milán (2010)	Cuatro	€25,000 (season one) €30,000 + accumulating jackpot (season two)	July 7, 2008 – June 10, 2010
Turkey	Kelimenin Gücü	Kenan Işık	aTV	500,000TL	May 17, 2010 – 2011
United Kingdom	Password	Ronnie Corbett	Channel 4	£10,000	2009 (Non-broadcast pilot)

== Licensed merchandise ==
Endless Games began distributing a home box version of Million Dollar Password in November 2008 and a second edition was released in June 2010. iToys distributed a handheld electronic version of the program in 2008. In November 2008, RealArcade published an iPhone OS game based on the show entitled Million Dollar Password 2009 Edition. In December 2008, the game was released on some mobile phone platforms and, in March 2009, RealArcade released a version of the game for PCs and Macs. Million Dollar Password 2009 Edition was released on CD-ROM in July 2009, distributed by Encore USA. Andrews McMeel published a 2010 day-to-day calendar based upon the program in July 2009.

== Ratings ==
=== U.S. standard ratings ===
In the following summary, "rating" is the percentage of all households with televisions that tuned to the show, and "share" is the percentage of all televisions in use at that time that are tuned in. "18–49" is the percentage of all adults aged 18–49 tuned into the show. "Viewers" is the number of viewers, in millions, watching at the time. "Rank" is how well the show did compared to other TV shows aired that week.

=== Season 1 (2008) ===
#	Airdate	Celebrities	Rating	Share	18–49	Viewers (millions)	Weekly rank
1	Sunday, June 1, 2008	Neil Patrick Harris, Rachael Ray	6.8	12	2.2/7	10.69	#3
2	Sunday, June 8, 2008	Tony Hawk, Rosie O'Donnell	6.3	11	2.1/6	9.64	#5
3	Thursday, June 12, 2008	Susie Essman, Betty White	6.4	12	2.0/7	9.52	#7
4	Sunday, June 22, 2008	Shanna Moakler, Steven Weber	5.5	10	1.5/5	8.29	#12
5	Sunday, June 29, 2008	Sara Evans, Steve Schirripa	5.6	10	1.7/5	8.55	#7
6	Sunday, July 6, 2008	Monique Coleman, Damien Fahey	5.0	9	1.3/5	7.53	#3

=== Season 2 (2008–2009) ===
#	Airdate	Celebrities	Rating	Share	18–49	Viewers (millions)	Weekly rank
7	Thursday, December 18, 2008	William Shatner, Aisha Tyler	5.3	9	1.6/5	8.27	#24
8	Sunday, December 21, 2008	Julie Chen Moonves, Phil Keoghan	6.0	10	1.8/5	9.52	#19
9	Sunday, December 28, 2008	Adam Carolla, Betty White	6.3	10	2.0/5	9.84	#7
10	Sunday, January 4, 2009	Craig Ferguson, Serena Williams	6.8	10	1.9/5	10.43	#14
11	Sunday, May 31, 2009	Jamie Kennedy, Norm Macdonald	4.5	8	1.2/4	6.88	#20
12	Sunday, June 14, 2009	Jeff Garlin, Chelsea Handler	4.4	8	1.0/3	6.69	#22
