= Passwords (band) =

Canadian rock band

- Credit: Jose Enrique Montes Hernandez

Background information
- Origin: Montreal, Quebec, Canada
- Genres: Indie rock Psychedelic; Post-rock
- Years active: 2009–present
- Labels: Mercy
- Members: Thomas L'Allier; Emmanuel Ethier; Philippe L'Allier; Carmel Scurti-Belley; Maxime Castellon
- Website: psswrds.com

Passwords are a Canadian rock band formed in 2009 in Montreal, fronted by Thomas L'Allier and Emmanuel Ethier.

== History ==
Passwords was created by vocalist and guitarist Thomas L'Allier and long-time musical partner Emmanuel Ethier. They both started working on songs together back in their teenage years. "We all met in high school, back when I was part of a blues rock band. I eventually got bored of 3 chord riffs, and started to write songs with Emmanuel, who was studying classical violin at the time," says L'Allier. "We sort of combined sounds and influences, to create something more challenging and substantial."

They later recruited Carmel Scurti-Belley and Maxime Castellon, becoming an official band and starting work on their first full-length album.

"I guess the way the album came along is pretty unique. Emmanuel came up with all the drum parts, which is odd considering he's not a drummer. It gave the whole thing a very "guitary" approach. We then recorded with a 'real' drummer to make everything work. Also, we tend to go all-out with arrangements, no-holds-barred. Finally, I'd say the fact that we fully commit to our folk/rock influences, but without sticking to the standard forms and structures of those genres, makes everything stand out" says L'Allier.

Recognized for their pastoral pop sound, dwelling between psychedelic rock and lovelorn folk, the band began gathering a lot of interest in their local independent music scene. Noticed during a breakthrough performance at the Pop Music Festival in Montreal, the band was signed to a record deal.

After more than two years in the making, their self-titled debut album was released April 26, 2011 through Mercy in Canada.

In 2011, the band appeared at the NXNE music festival in Toronto. Additionally, the band played the 2011 Osheaga Festival in Montreal, as well as many other local shows throughout Canada.

== Members ==
- Thomas L'Allier – vocals, guitar
- Emmanuel Ethier – guitar, vocals, synthesizers
- Philippe L'Allier – piano, synthesizers, vocals
- Carmel Scurti-Belley – synthesizers, vocals
- Maxime Castellon – bass guitar

== Discography ==
=== Studio albums ===
- Passwords CD & LP (Mercy, 2011)

=== Singles ===
- "The Fire We've Made" (April, 2011)
