= Vic Roby =

American actor

Victor Mills Roby, Jr. (November 9, 1917 – September 22, 2011 ) was an American radio and television announcer, voice-over artist and public affairs show host, and served for years as a staff announcer with NBC.

== Early life and career ==
Born in Tylertown, Mississippi, Roby was an alumnus of Millsaps College ('38) where he had been an Alpha Iota brother. He entered the broadcasting business in 1943, working as a newsreader and announcer at KOA (AM) in Denver, Colorado. After a brief stint with the Mutual Broadcasting System where he announced on the 1950 version of The Rudy Vallee Show, Roby joined the announcing staff of NBC in New York City in 1950.

== Network announcer ==
Roby handled announcing for numerous radio and television programs during his career, including Monitor and working as sub-announcer on Concentration and The Price Is Right in the early 1960s. But his chief claim to fame was announcing on network promos, bumpers and program introductions, most notably a variation of the shortened 1968 version of the "Laramie Peacock" bumper on which he intoned, "The following program is brought to you in living color on NBC," which ran on television specials aired on the network through 1975. In addition, he handled local announcing duties for WNBC-TV, including public service announcements, station identifications, live tags and occasional Emergency Broadcast System tests. He was one of a core group of well-known voices for the NBC network which also included Don Pardo, Howard Reig, Mel Brandt, Bill Wendell, Roger Tuttle, Bill McCord, Arthur Gary, Bill Hanrahan, Wayne Howell and Jerry Damon (whose voice bore some similarities to Roby's, leading to some confusion between the two).

== Commercial voice-over ==
Over the years, Roby did many commercials for various products and services on both radio and television; he was part of a group of New York announcers (also including his NBC colleague Howard Reig and WOR-TV's Phil Tonken) who did so. Roby made headlines in 1969 when he put an advertisement in Variety indicating that he would no longer be available for cigarette commercials, citing "evidence . . . that smoking could lead to cancer, heart attacks, strokes, emphysema and fires." He was one of a growing number of media personalities to do so, nearly two years before cigarette advertising on television was banned.

== Public affairs host ==
Roby also served as host, narrator or interviewer on numerous public affairs shows that ran on NBC's New York radio and TV outlets. On WNBC-TV, he was a moderator of the discussion/call-in show Direct Line for much of its 1959–73 run, and after its cancellation he was one of the narrators of the long-running weekly documentary series, New York Illustrated. On WNBC (AM), he hosted another call-in series, In Contact.

== Retirement and death ==
Roby, who lived for years in Scarsdale, New York, retired from NBC in 1983. In 2008, he and his wife, Josephine, moved to Framingham, Massachusetts.

Roby died in Natick, Massachusetts after a brief illness on September 22, 2011 at age 93.
