= Arthur Gary =

American actor

Arthur John Gary (January 28, 1914 in New York City – October 31, 2005 in New York) was an American radio and television announcer.

A graduate of New York University, Gary's announcing career spanned from 1936 to 1984. From the 1940s until his retirement, he was part of a core group of East Coast announcers for NBC which included Don Pardo, Bill Wendell, Vic Roby, Mel Brandt, Jerry Damon, Dick Dudley, Howard Reig, and Wayne Howell.

Gary was a newscaster and one of the main announcers for the long-running radio program, The Eternal Light. His other radio announcing credits included Dimension X, The Bill Stern Colgate Sports Newsreel, and Author Meets the Critics. He also announced for various NBC television programs over the years, and handled program introductions and closes, station identifications, promos, bumpers, teasers, taglines, public service announcements, sign-ons and sign-offs for both the network and its New York owned-and-operated station, WNBC-TV.

Gary died of leukemia at age 91.
