= Bill McCord =

American broadcaster

William J. McCord
- Born: December 18, 1916; Colville, Washington, U.S.
- Died: January 17, 2004 (aged 87); San Diego, California, U.S.
- Occupations: Radio; television announcer

William J. McCord (December 18, 1916 – January 17, 2004) was an American radio and television announcer.

Born in Colville, Washington, McCord moved to Spokane in the 1930s, where he began his broadcasting career. During World War II, he served as a pilot in the United States Army Air Forces, stationed in Riverside, California, and rose to the rank of First Lieutenant. For several years starting in the 1940s, he was based out of WLW in Cincinnati, Ohio, and announced on a few programs that aired on NBC, including The Circle Arrow Show.

McCord joined the announcing staff of NBC in New York in the early 1950s. His radio announcing credits for the network included Easy Money, Monitor, and a 1956 episode of X Minus One.

On television, McCord was one of several announcers, including Don Pardo, Bill Wendell, Roger Tuttle, Vic Roby and Wayne Howell, whose voice was heard on several NBC game shows. His most notable credits in that realm, in the 1950s, included Twenty One, Concentration, and Tic-Tac-Dough. In his later years with the network, up to his retirement in 1980, McCord's announcing work largely consisted of sub-announcing on NBC Nightly News and the one-minute NBC News Updates (as a frequent fill-in for regular announcer Bill Hanrahan), as well as occasional booth announcing duties for the local flagship station, WNBC-TV. McCord hosted shows like 30 Minutes in New York until he moved to California.

Following his retirement, McCord moved to San Diego, California. He died there of complications from pneumonia at age 87.

His son is rock musician Billy Vera.

== References and sources ==
- Obituary on Clan MacCord USA website (Reprinted from The San Diego Union-Tribune, January 24, 2004)

Media offices
Preceded by none	Voice, Concentration; 1958	Succeeded by Art James (1958-69)
