= Jerry Damon =

American staff announcer and actor (1927–1979)

Horace Jerome D'Amato (August 24, 1927 – January 24, 1979), known professionally as Jerry Damon, was an American radio and television announcer and actor.

== Biography ==
Damon was a staff announcer for NBC in New York from 1954 until his death. He was part of a core group that, during his years with the network, also included voice-over artists Bill Wendell, Don Pardo, Mel Brandt, Wayne Howell, Vic Roby and Howard Reig. He handled network program introductions and closes, bumpers, promos, and teasers. He also handled occasional sign-offs and live tags, for the network's New York flagship station WNBC-TV and its radio sister stations (WNBC (AM), which became WFAN and WNBC-FM/WNWS/WYNY, later WQHT).

Damon's radio announcing credits include Monitor, the original version of X Minus One, and The Eternal Light. His main television credits were the 1964-65 American version of That Was the Week That Was, plus other shows for which he announced, G.E. College Bowl, Haggis Baggis and The Jan Murray Show. He also was a spokesman for coverage of political conventions, and from 1975 to 1977, he was food editor for NBC's ill-fated News and Information Service radio network.

Outside of the announcing booth, Damon owned a dairy farm in Milford, New York. In addition, in the early 1960s, he was part of a group that made a bid to purchase Ellis Island.

Damon died of cancer at Beth Israel Medical Center in Newark, New Jersey at age 51.
