= The Colgate Sports Newsreel =

1939-1956 radio program focusing on sports

- Running time: 15 minutes
- Country of origin: United States
- Language: English
- Syndicates: NBC; ABC
- Starring: Bill Stern
- Announcer: Arthur Gary
- Written by: Bill Davidson; Mac Davis; Barney Nagler
- Directed by: Chuck Kebbe; Maurice Robinson; Joseph Mansfield
- Original release: October 8, 1939 – June 1956

The Colgate Sports Newsreel was a radio program focusing on sports. It has been called "one of the most successful and most listened-to shows in radio history" and "one of radio broadcasting's most entertaining and engaging programs." However, much of the information reported as fact was actually fiction.

The program was first broadcast in October 1939, on NBC Blue. Although Colgate dropped its sponsorship in June 1951, the show continued on NBC as Bill Stern's Sports Newsreel through September 1953. It then switched to ABC, where it ran until June 1956. During World War II, the Newsreel was among the programs that NBC rebroadcast by transcription to members of the United States armed forces stationed abroad.

Bill Stern, the star, made the program memorable with his enthusiastic, dramatized delivery. He was already both the narrator of MGM's News of the Day newsreels, and a sports announcer. Thus, the format of this program came naturally.

For most of its run, the show was sponsored by Colgate brushless shave cream. The opening theme "was sung in barbershop quartet style to the tune of Mademoiselle from Armentieres" and mentioned the sponsoring product prominently. Although the singing group was not named in the program, a news brief announcing the show's launch in 1939 identified it as the Armchair Quartette. The theme's lyrics varied a bit over the years, but the basic form was as follows:

Bill Stern the Colgate shave-cream man is on the air.
Bill Stern the Colgate shave-cream man with stories rare.
Take his advice and you'll look keen.
You'll get a shave that's smooth and clean.
You'll be a Colgate brushless fan.

From September 14, 1953, through December 10, 1954, Budweiser sponsored the program. Its final sponsor was Allstate, from December 13, 1954 through June 22, 1956.

== Format ==
Stern dramatized sporting events from the past. His standard introduction indicated his dramatic approach to storytelling:

Good evening, ladies and gentlemen. This is Bill Stern bringing you the ____th edition of the Colgate shave cream Sports Newsreel ... featuring strange and fantastic stories ... some legend, some hearsay ... but all so interesting we'd like to pass them along to you!

The program treated sports people and their accomplishments almost mythologically. Tony Silvia wrote: "[Stern] delighted in telling stories about the players that cast them as heroes beyond the reach of mere mortals. Rather than humanizing his subjects, Stern embellished their prowess -- on and off the field -- to the point where listeners were spellbound by the story behind the story of any specific team or game." Use of sound effects, organ music and dramatization augmented this approach. Stern's page on the National Radio Hall of Fame's website cited his dramatic technique by saying, "Although some of his reports stretched the limits of credibility, no one doubted that Stern was a master storyteller who used emphasis, repetition, and pauses to perfection." Similarly, his Hall of Fame inductee page on the American Sportscasters Association's website notes the style of his broadcasts as follows: "Stern had a special flare [sic] for the dramatic, and employed organ music, full dramatizations, and sound effects in his broadcasts. His voice and broadcasting style reflected his enthusiasm for the sports he covered."

The program's appeal was frequently enhanced by inclusion of big-name guests. Radio Historian John Dunning wrote: "[O]ften he persuaded top stars -- Orson Welles, Jack Benny, Frank Sinatra and skater Sonja Henie were just a few -- to do guest spots. Each star had a personal tale that related in some way, however small, to sports." The program often originated from wherever Stern was preparing to broadcast a sporting event. Therefore, he often included a coach or player from the history of one of the teams in the current contest.

== Facts or Fabrications? ==
The "stories rare" mentioned in the show's opening theme may have resulted from the fact that much of what Stern reported in the Newsreel never actually happened. Bill Davidson, one of Stern's writers, said as much in a TV Guide article that was reprinted in New York magazine:

Every week, another writer and I -- on Stern's direction -- would unabashedly make up so-called "true sports stories," mostly about historical characters who were dead and could not protest. One of my classics was about Abraham Lincoln, who, having been assassinated at Ford's Theater in Washington, regained consciousness just long enough to say to Secretary of War Stanton, "Tell General Abner Doubleday not to let baseball die." After that whopper, NBC ordered Stern to label his dramatizations "sports legends" ...

Referring to Stern's lack of veracity on the Newsreel, Dunning wrote: "On his Colgate Sports Newsreel, [Stern] was known to tell the same story twice, a year or so apart, using conflicting facts and passing both versions as truth. Stern covered his tracks, reminding listeners that his stories were 'some true, some hearsay, but all so interesting we'd like to pass them along to you.'"

Not all criticism of Stern's cavalier attitude toward the facts came in retrospect. In 1949, radio critic John Crosby wrote: "Even the word 'hearsay' is a rather generous description, implying ... that Stern's stories have reached stature of legend ... This is misleading. Many of the most lurid of Stern's "legends" originated in the teeming brains of his writers and started their way to legend only after Stern put them on the air to his devoted audience..." Crosby went on to cite one example of Stern's "legends": according to the Newsreel, Thomas Edison's "deafness was the result of a pitched ball that hit him in the head when he was a semi-pro ballplayer which he never was ... The pitcher who threw that ball, according to Stern, was Jesse James."

Jack French's 2008 article in Radio Recall pointed out several false "legends" on the Stern show, in addition to those cited above:

- Pitcher Christy Mathewson inspired George Gershwin to write "Rhapsody in Blue."
- Sportswriter Grantland Rice advised Frank Sinatra to give up boxing and concentrate on singing.
- A boy whose arms and legs were amputated after he spent a night in the snow in below-zero temperatures went on to win a swimming championship the following year.

== Broadcast History ==
Start date	End date	Network	Day(s)	Starting Time	Sponsor	Length
October 8, 1939	September 28, 1941	NBC Blue	Sunday	9:45 p.m.	Colgate	15 minutes
October 4, 1941	May 22, 1943	NBC Red	Saturday	10 p.m.	Colgate	15 minutes
May 28, 1943	June 29, 1951	NBC	Friday	10:30 p.m.	Colgate	15 minutes
November 30, 1951	April 1953	NBC	Friday	6:15 p.m.	NA	15 minutes
April 20, 1953	August 14, 1953	NBC	Monday-Friday	6:15 p.m.	NA	15 minutes
September 14, 1953	December 10, 1954	ABC	Monday-Friday	6:30 p.m.	Budweiser	15 minutes
December 13, 1954	June 22, 1956	ABC	Monday-Friday	NA	Allstate	15 minutes

Note: "NA"—information was not listed on the cited page.
