= Wayne Howell =

American actor

- Born: Wayne Howell Chappelle; February 16, 1921; Lexington, Kentucky, U.S.
- Died: July 8, 1993 (aged 72); Pompano Beach, Florida, U.S.
- Occupation: Announcer
- Years active: 1947–1986
- Spouse: Thelma

Wayne Howell Chappelle (February 16, 1921 – July 8, 1993) was a voice-over announcer for the NBC television and radio networks from 1947 through 1986. He was born in Lexington, Kentucky, and became one member of a core group of New York-based announcers including Don Pardo, Bill Wendell, Jerry Damon, Arthur Gary, Vic Roby, Mel Brandt, Gene Hamilton, and Howard Reig who handled not only introducing and closing programs, but also teasers and promotions for the network's shows.

Howell's radio announcing credits included The Martin and Lewis Show, a 1950s version of The Chamber Music Society of Lower Basin Street, The NBC Radio Theatre, and Monitor. Among the television programs he announced on were Broadway Open House, Music Bingo, Dotto, Say When!!, Match Game, Concentration, Missing Links and Jackpot!. From 1966 to 1985, he was announcer for the Miss America Pageant. Howell presumably provided voice-overs for numerous other NBC programs during his tenure, often as a substitute for the show's regular announcer. From 1980-1982 he introduced NBC's regional college basketball opening: "NBC Sports in association with TVS presents the best college basketball... on the [various conference] game of the week."

Among his many assignments for NBC, Howell also appeared regularly as a personality on NBC's New York flagship radio station, WNBC (AM), from the 1940s through the mid-1960s. He also was the last voice on WNWS, an all-news station that ran on NBC's FM owned-and-operated station in 1976, before the station switched to an adult contemporary format.

Wayne Howell remained with NBC as a full-time staff announcer, at a time when the position was being phased out. The broadcasting networks wanted to have their announcers pre-record their remarks so the tapes could be used repeatedly, replacing the announcers in person. The move was resisted by the AFTRA union, and was finally resolved when the union consented to pre-recording but insisted that all incumbent staff announcers must be guaranteed lifetime jobs. Thus Wayne Howell retired from NBC at age 65.

From 1974 through 1982 Howell was married to Donna Marie Gillin, a New York City socialite. They lived in midtown Manhattan until 1982. They were divorced in 1983. He is the maternal step-grandfather of stuntman, comedian and actor Steve-O.

Following his retirement from NBC, Howell moved to Broward County, Florida. He died in Pompano Beach, at age 72.

Media offices
Preceded by Art James	Voice, Concentration; 1969-73	Succeeded by Johnny Olson
