= Haggis Baggis =

American television game show

- Created by: Joe Cates
- Presented by: Jack Linkletter (nighttime); Fred Robbins (daytime, 1958-1959); Dennis James (1959)
- Narrated by: Bill Wendell; Jerry Damon
- Country of origin: United States

Production
- Running time: 24 mins.

Original release
- Network: NBC
- Release: June 30, 1958 – June 19, 1959

Haggis Baggis is an American game show that aired on NBC from 1958 to 1959. Jack Linkletter hosted the primetime version while Fred Robbins and Dennis James did the daytime show. The announcer was Bill Wendell, with some editions announced by Jerry Damon.

The series was produced by Rainbow Productions, otherwise known as Joe Cates Productions, and created by William T. Naud.

== Game play ==
Two players, usually women, competed. The object was to identify an image of a celebrity's face, that was concealed behind a 5×5 grid, with the horizontal dimension showing letters and the vertical dimension showing categories. The host announced a category and one of the letters. Then the player in control had to come up with a word or phrase that fit the category. For each acceptable answer given, a piece of the picture connected to the category and letter was revealed. When a signal was sounded after four combinations were played (two per player), the game continued with the player choosing a category, then a letter, and finally an answer that fit both criteria. The first player to solve the picture won the game and became champion. In the event that either contestant made a mistake on the picture, the game automatically went to the opponent. The winner of the game would receive a better role in the bonus round and earn the right to play the next game.

In the bonus game the winner would secretly choose one of two prizes titled "Haggis (luxury items)" or "Baggis (utilitarian items)". If the opponent chose the other package, each contestant won the prizes they chose; if not, then only the champion won whatever she selected.

Champions could stay on the program until defeated.

== Broadcast history ==
The series debuted on June 30, 1958 in both daytime and nighttime. The daytime series was hosted by Fred Robbins from the June 30 debut until he resigned February 6, 1959. The following Monday, Dennis James took over and hosted through the end of the daytime run; James noted on his first episode that he was given no warning that he was taking over the show, forcing him to learn the rules of the game on the fly.

The nighttime series ran from June 30 to September 29, 1958 with Linkletter as host. Linkletter refused to do the daytime version so as to not compete with his father Art Linkletter.

== Episode status ==
The series has not been rerun and is most likely wiped due to network policies at the time. For NBC in particular, this was quite common through 1980.

Two episodes are known to exist, both hosted by Jack Linkletter, which are held by the UCLA Film and Television Archive. James's first episode, likely from the personal library he maintained during his lifetime (now managed by his son Brad), also exists.
