= Ethel and Albert =

Radio and television comedy series

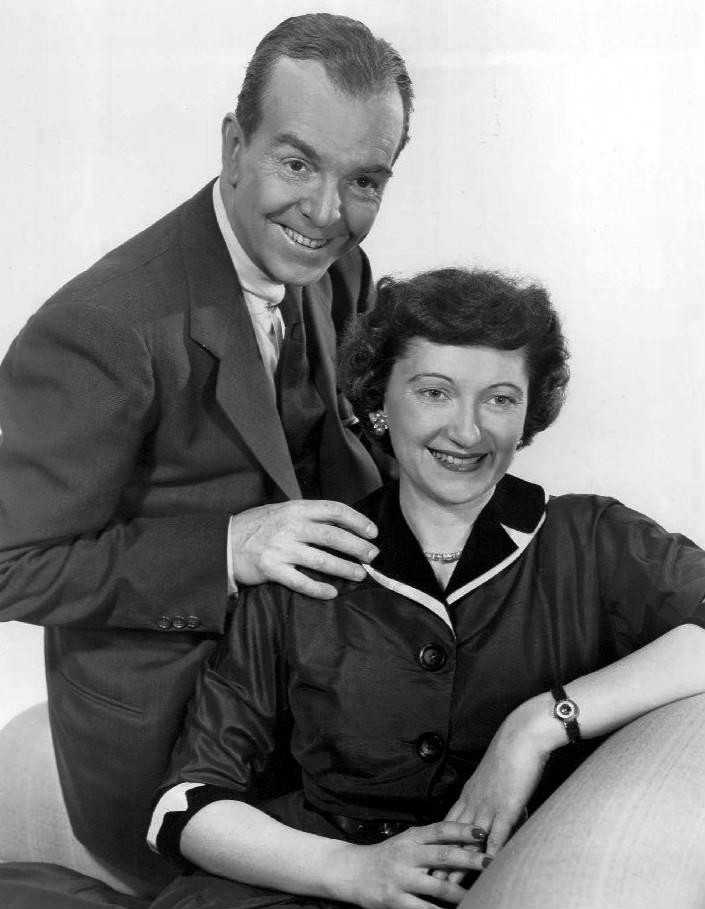
Peg Lynch and Alan Bunce, 1953.

Ethel and Albert (a.k.a. The Private Lives of Ethel and Albert) is a radio and television comedy series about a married couple, Ethel and Albert Arbuckle, living in the small town of Sandy Harbor. Created by Peg Lynch, who scripted and portrayed Ethel, the series first aired on local Minnesota radio in the early 1940s before a run on the NBC Blue Network and ABC from May 29, 1944, to August 28, 1950. It co-starred Alan Bunce as Albert.

Radio historian Gerald Nachman (in Raised on Radio) called the show "insightful and realistic... a real leap forward in domestic comedy—a lighthearted, clever, well-observed, daily 15-minute show about the amiable travails of a recognizable suburban couple" which combined "the domestic comedy of a vaudeville-based era with a keen modern sensibility. Lynch made her comic points without stooping to female stereotypes, insults, running gags, funny voices or goofy plots."

The show began as three-minute filler between a pair of Minnesota KATE station programs, then expanded to 15 minutes, and finally became a half-hour show during its last years on radio. Like Easy Aces, the humor on Ethel and Albert was low key; like Vic and Sade, it was constructed around such simple, often mundane household situations as efforts to open a pickle jar. Often Ethel or Albert attempted to prove the other wrong over some inconsequential matter. For example, one entire script centered on Ethel's disputing Albert's claim that he could see her using only his peripheral vision. "I realized that I didn't have to sit down and knock myself out every minute to try to think of something funny," Lynch told critic Leonard Maltin years later. "All I had to do was look around me."

Two film stars had a presence in the show. Richard Widmark, who portrayed Albert in 1944, left after six months and was replaced by Alan Bunce. Margaret Hamilton, famous as the Wicked Witch of the West in The Wizard of Oz, played Aunt Eva. Ethel and Albert's daughter Suzy (Madeleine Pierce, born in 1946) was the only other voice heard on the original series.

== Television ==
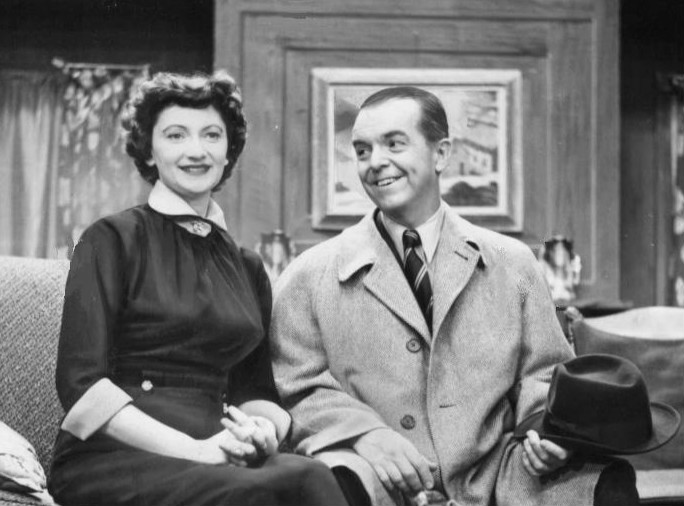
Peg Lynch and Alan Bunce in the television version of the show, 1954.

Peg Lynch brought her series to television as a continuing 15-minute segment on The Kate Smith Hour during the 1952–53 season. Lynch admitted years later that she wasn't happy with the move. "Ethel and Albert was a quiet show," she told Nachman, "and I was not a stage person who was accustomed to performing in front of an audience, as comedians are. And I always felt it spoiled my timing. I would have to hold up for the laugh."

The radio program about peripheral vision was only one of the radio scripts that Lynch rewrote for television. The Ethel and Albert television series was launched on NBC (April 25, 1953 – December 25, 1954). It moved to CBS (June 20, 1955 – September 26, 1955) as a summer replacement for December Bride and ended its television life on ABC (October 14, 1955 – July 6, 1956).

Scripts, kinescopes, financial documents and correspondence from the show are contained in the Peg Lynch Collection at the Knight Library at the University of Oregon. Several episodes of the television version also survive at the UCLA Film and Television Archive.

== The Couple Next Door ==
The Couple Next Door was a similar Peg Lynch radio series which aired on CBS Radio during the waning days of network radio, (December 30, 1957 – November 25, 1960) with Margaret "Peg" Lynch and Alan Bunce as the married couple. Essentially, it reprised Ethel and Albert, but the new name was necessitated because Lynch had lost the rights to the original title. The CBS iteration was named Best Daytime Radio Program for 1959 by The National Association for Better Radio and Television.

Lynch and Bunce brought the program to NBC's weekend programming block Monitor in 1963, performing three- to four-minute vignettes not unlike the original 15-minute shows. Their presence continued a Monitor tradition of offering new material from classic radio favorites (including James and Marian Jordan of Fibber McGee and Molly fame, until Marian Jordan's death). Lynch returned again in the 1970s. In 1973, she revived Ethel and Albert on National Public Radio's Earplay with a 16-episode run. Karl Schmidt, the creator of Earplay, played Albert in this incarnation. In 1976, she wrote and starred in a syndicated radio feature known as The Little Things in Life, again with Margaret Hamilton and with Robert Dryden as the husband. The Little Things in Life was part of a four-series block syndicated under the umbrella title Radio Playhouse.

Very few of the original Ethel and Albert radio programs are known to have survived, but almost all of the CBS Couple Next Door episodes exist. Lynch authorized a CD release of 12 Ethel and Albert vignettes from Monitor.

The theme music for The Couple Next Door is "Miss Melanie" by British composer Ronald Binge.

== Sources ==
- Wertheim, Arthur Frank. Radio Comedy. New York: Oxford University Press, 1979.

== Listen to ==
- Internet Archive: The Couple Next Door
