= Ted Husing =

American sportscaster (1901–1962)

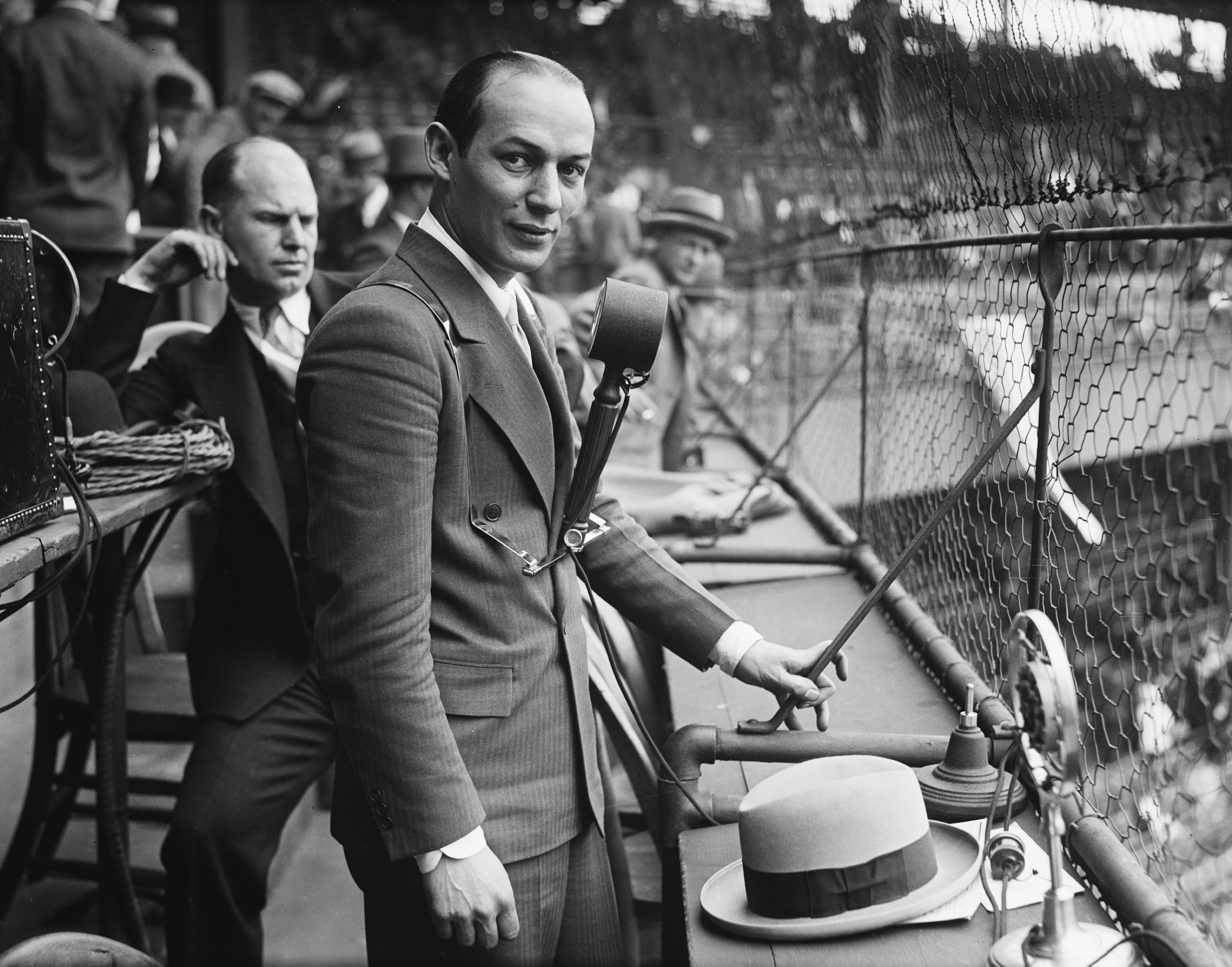
- Husing in April, 1930
- Born: Edward Britt Husing; November 27, 1901; The Bronx, New York City, New York
- Died: August 10, 1962 (aged 60); Pasadena, California
- Occupation: Sports commentator

Edward Britt Husing (November 27, 1901 – August 10, 1962) was an American sports commentator. He was among the first to lay the groundwork for the structure and pace of modern sports reporting on radio and television.

== Overview ==
=== Early life and career ===
Husing was born in The Bronx, New York, and given the name Edmund. (One source says Husing was born in Deming, New Mexico. Another says, "Husing was born in New Mexico, and while still in knee breeches was moved across to [sic] the United States to Gloversville, N.Y.")

The youngest of three children of German immigrant parents, he was the only one to survive childhood. His father, Henry, was a fan of middleweight boxing champ Jimmy Edward Britt. By his tenth birthday, the boy's name was changed to Edward Britt Husing. As a teenager, he took on the tag of "Ted" and the nickname stuck. He was active in four sports at Stuyvesant High School and was all-scholastic center in football.

At age 16, he joined the National Guard and in World War I was assigned to stand watch over New York's harbor. Following the war, he floated between jobs such as carnival barker and payroll clerk. After he won an audition over 500 other applicants for announcer at New York City radio station WHN, Husing found his life's calling. He was schooled under the tutelage of pioneer broadcaster J. Andrew White. There he covered breaking news stories and political conventions and assisted White during football commentaries.

By 1926, Husing was working at WJZ, which made him "its specialist in announcing dance programs." A newspaper article reported that Husing was selected for the job "out of 610 applications for the position of announcer at station WJZ."

As an announcer, Husing's rapid manner of speech earned him the nickname Mile a Minute Husing. His use of descriptive language combined with a commanding voice made his broadcasts must-listen events. By 1927, he was voted seventh most popular announcer in a national poll. Following a pay dispute, he moved to Boston, where he broadcast Boston Braves (now Atlanta Braves) baseball games.

Later in 1927, he returned to New York and helped his mentor, J. Andrew White, start the new CBS chain. After cigar mogul William S. Paley bought the cash-strapped network in 1928, Ted Husing rose to new heights of glory and fame.

=== CBS ===
At CBS, Husing took on a wide variety of events. In 1929, he was named studio director of WABC (the CBS flagship station) in addition to continuing his work as an announcer for the network.

He was the original voice of the March of Time program and an announcer for shows such as George Burns and Gracie Allen. Above everything, his work on sports gave Husing the greatest prominence. He covered events as diverse as boxing, horse racing, track and field, regattas, seven World Series, tennis, golf, four Olympic Games, Indianapolis 500 motor racing, and especially college football.

In addition to his sports preeminence, Husing did news and special events coverage for the CBS Radio Network. In the 1930s, he gave early tutelage to a budding CBS Radio announcer, Mel Allen, who, like Husing, would become a sportscaster. (And, like Husing, Allen would also understudy in news, with Robert Trout.) In 1933–1934, he was host of the Oldsmobile Program, providing sports news to complement music from other participants on the program.

In both sports and special events areas, Husing developed a bitter rivalry with rising NBC announcer Bill Stern. When the two became the sports stars of their rival networks (and eventually their networks' sports directors), they would battle fiercely not only for events but also for broadcast position.

Husing could be arrogant, coarse, and opinionated. He was the first to bring a candid, editorial style to sports play-by-play. He was barred for two years by Harvard University from covering its home football games after he called All-American quarterback Barry Wood's performance "putrid". After criticizing World Series umpires in 1934, Husing was banned from doing play-by-play of the Fall Classic by Commissioner Kenesaw Mountain Landis.

=== Move from CBS to WHN ===
In 1946, Husing moved from CBS to WHN (later WMGM) to pursue a career as a disk jockey. (He was succeeded as CBS Radio's sports director by Red Barber.) Husing's popular music show the Ted Husing Bandstand ran from 1946 to 1954. He continued to busy himself with sports assignments, including boxing on CBS and DuMont television, one year (1950) as the radio voice of New York Giants football, and as host of DuMont's Boxing From Eastern Parkway from May 1952 to March 1953. Perhaps he was best known as the voice of Army football from 1947 to 1953. By that time, Husing's yearly salary was close to half a million dollars.

The trade publication Variety reported that Husing's dismissal from the DuMont boxing broadcasts "set a precedent which is being labelled as a discredit to the industry." Husing's departure was initially said to be for economic reasons, but later reports indicated that he was let go because of criticism by people in the boxing business. Husing had been employed by packager Emil Lence — not DuMont — so the decision was beyond the network's control.

=== Forced retirement and death ===
In the spring of 1954, an operation to treat a malignant brain tumor left him blind and forced him to retire. He appeared on the television show This Is Your Life, broadcasters held a fundraiser for him in January 1957, and talk of a comeback followed. However, his condition worsened and the plans were stifled. After moving to Pasadena, California, under the care of his mother, Bertha, and daughter Peggemae, he died in 1962. He was interred at Mountain View Cemetery and Mausoleum in Pasadena.

=== Awards ===
In 1963, Husing became the second inductee of the National Sportscasters and Sportswriters Association Hall of Fame.

In 1984, Husing was part of the American Sportscasters Association Hall of Fame’s inaugural class which included sportscasting legends Red Barber, Don Dunphy, Graham McNamee and Bill Stern.

=== Books ===
Husing wrote a memoir, Ten Years Before the Mike, published by Farrar & Rinehart in 1935. It was also printed in serial form in Cosmopolitan magazine. He also wrote, with the "as told to" assistance of Cy Rice, a book about his blindness: My Eyes Are in My Heart. It was published in 1959 by Hillman Books.

== Legacy ==
As a college football commentator for CBS, he laid down much of the structure of football play-by-play that is still used today. He devised some of the earliest spotting boards to identify the players on the field. Husing also interviewed coaches and players before games and attended strategy sessions.

In 1936, Husing narrated Catching Trouble, a Paramount non-sports newsreel documentary about herpetologist Ross Allen that would gain later prominence as a short subject on Mystery Science Theater 3000, during which the characters parodied Husing's distinctive delivery.

Husing has a star in the Radio section of the Hollywood Walk of Fame at 6821 Hollywood Boulevard.

His "on air" voice was heard (as himself) over a radio in the 1936 Broadway stage production of Double Dummy, written by Doty Hobart and Tom McKnight and staged by Edith Meisner.
