= Catbird seat =

Phrase meaning an enviable position

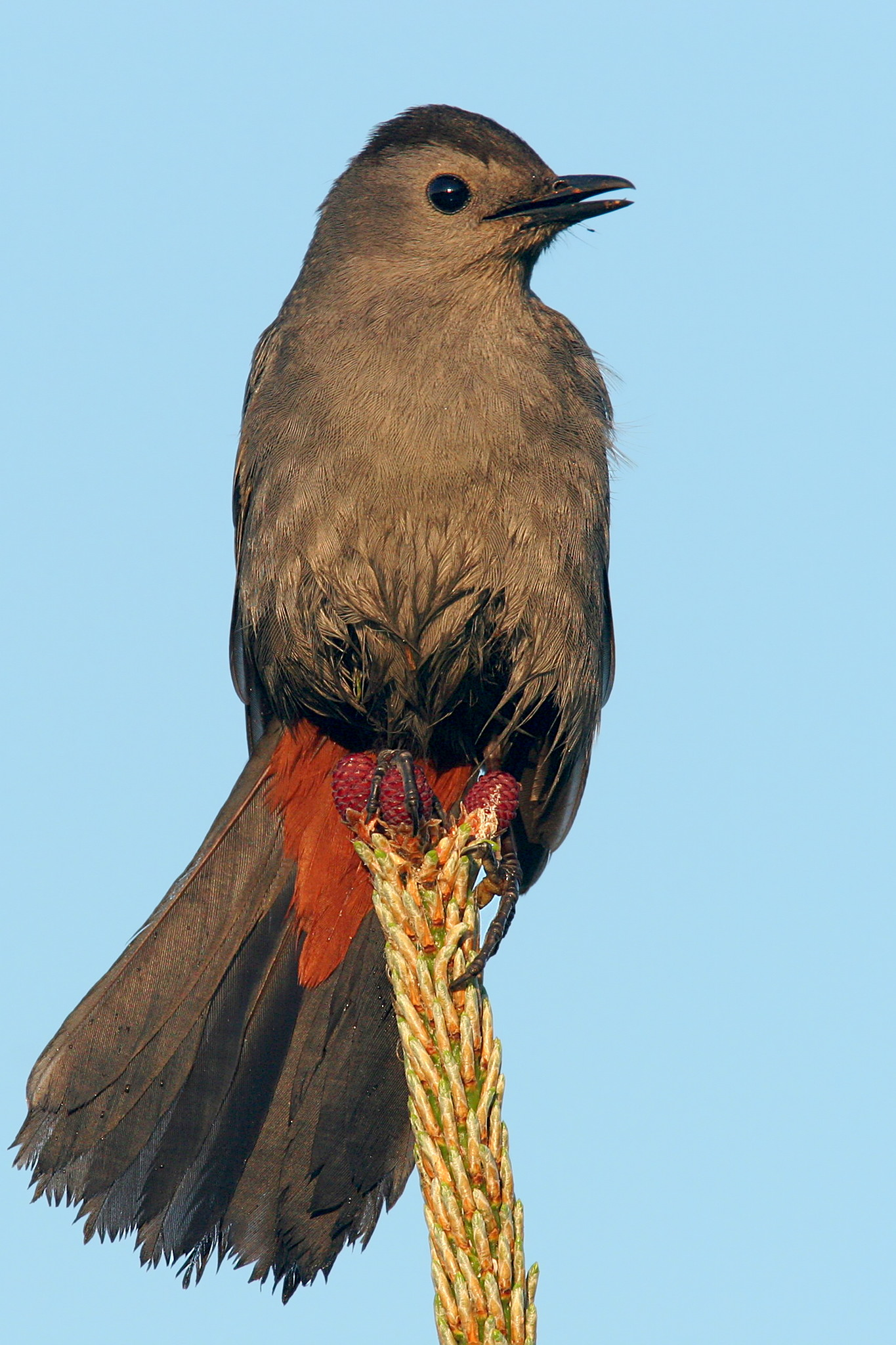
The gray catbird, Dumetella carolinensis, atop a fir tree

"The catbird seat" is an idiomatic phrase used to describe an enviable position, such as having the upper hand or greater advantage in any type of dealing among parties. It derives from the secluded perch on which the gray catbird makes mocking calls.

== Source ==
According to Douglas Harper's Online Etymological Dictionary, the phrase refers to the gray catbird and was used in the 20th century in the American South.

An early use of the term can be found in the Columbia Daily Tribune in the April 21, 1900 edition.

According to the Oxford English Dictionary, the first documented use occurred in a 1942 humorous short story by James Thurber titled "The Catbird Seat", which features a character, Mrs. Barrows, who likes to use the phrase. Another character, Joey Hart, explains that Mrs. Barrows must have picked up the expression from the baseball broadcaster Red Barber, and that "sitting in the catbird seat" meant "'sitting pretty', like a batter with three balls and no strikes on him."

According to "Colonel" Bob Edwards's book Fridays with Red, Barber claimed that Thurber got this and many other expressions from him, and that Barber had first heard the term used by Frank Koch during a poker game in Cincinnati, during the Great Depression. Barber also put forth this version of events in his 1968 autobiography, Rhubarb in the Catbird Seat.

== Use in popular entertainment ==
- 1948: Season 1, Episode 5 of the Actors Studio was titled "The Catbird Seat"
- 1958: P. G. Wodehouse's 1958 novel Cocktail Time used the phrase: "I get you. If we swing it, we'll be sitting pretty, ‘in the catbird seat’."
- 1978: The original television series Dallas featured J.R. Ewing using this phrase quite often.
- 1987: Raising Arizona included John Goodman saying "you and I'll be sittin' in the fabled catbird seat."
- 1988: William L. Marbury Jr. called his memoirs In the Catbird Seat
- 1997: In the Simpsons episode Homer vs. the Eighteenth Amendment the narrator says "With rum-running hoodlums in the catbird seat..."
- 2003: On the 14th episode of the sixth season of Survivor: The Amazon, host Jeff Probst asks "How does it feel to be in the catbird seat?" to immunity winner, Jenna Morasca.
- 2006: Series 3, Episode 11 of the HBO western drama, Deadwood was titled "The Catbird Seat."
- 2009: Steve Forbert digitally released an album, Loose Change, that included a song he wrote called "The Catbird Seat"
- 2010: Darlingside released EP 1, which features a song called "The Catbird Seat."
- 2010: On season 2 of the Starz TV series Party Down, the fictional writer A.F. Gordon Theodore is seen sitting between two beautiful women when he says, “I am in the seat named for the proverbial catbird.”
- 2014: In the TV series Manhattan, the phrase was used in multiple episodes as an American idiom
- 2018: In the TV series Barry Season 1 Episode 4, Fuches uses the phrase "So, now we are in the catbird seat."
- 2018–present: Shannon Sharpe uses this phrase on Skip and Shannon: Undisputed while debating with Skip Bayless, Sharpe uses the phrase often to explain who has the upper hand in the sport example "Patrick Mahomeboy is in the catbird seat for MVP".
- 2019-Present: Used in the "Warlords of New York" expansion for the video game, Tom Clancy's Division 2. Used by an ally of the main character about a rogue enemy agent.
- 2021: In the HBO TV series Succession Season 3 Episode 7, the phrase is used by Shiv Roy to describe Roman and Logan Roy’s close relationship while holding an advantaged strategic position in a contract negotiation.
- 2022: In the online short form show Corrections by Seth Meyers, Meyers used the phrase "pretty catbird seat to me" to describe the timing of his soup delivery to late night host Jimmy Kimmel, who had just fallen ill with COVID-19 a second time.
- 2025: In Taylor Sheridan & Hugh Dillon TV Series, Mayors of Kingstown made for Paramount Plus. Season 4 Episode 1 (7 minutes 40 seconds) character Lt Ian Ferguson (Played by Co- creator Hugh Dillon) says to character Michael "Mike" Mcluskey (Played by Actor Jeremy Renner) ..."I mean he's in the Catbird seat, there is no need for this F-ing overkill." About a group of murders attributed to a local gang leader called Deverin "Bunny" Washington (played by Actor Tobi Bamtefa).
