= Don Dunphy =

American sports broadcast announcer (1908–1998)

- Dunphy in 1955
- Born: July 5, 1908; New York City, U.S.
- Died: July 22, 1998 (aged 90)
- Burial place: Cemetery of the Holy Rood, New York
- Occupations: Sports & Television announcer
- Children: 2

Don Dunphy (July 5, 1908 – July 22, 1998) was an American television and radio sports announcer specializing in boxing broadcasts. Dunphy was noted for his fast-paced delivery and enthusiasm for the sport. It is estimated that he did "blow-by-blow" action for over 2,000 fights, including historic bouts like the 1971 Fight of the Century between Muhammad Ali and Joe Frazier. The Friday Night Fights were broadcast every Friday evening from (radio and television (1939–1981) 9 P.M. to 10:45 P.M on ABC.

== Biography ==
He was born in New York City, and was a graduate of Manhattan College. At the beginning of his career, he was a sportswriter for the New York World and the newspaper PM. While Dunphy was best known as a boxing expert, he also broadcast the evening sports report on WINS in New York, and in mid-July 1943, he was chosen by the BBC to give a summary of the All-Star game that was relayed to American troops stationed in England and North Africa. Dunphy's broadcast was well-received, and the BBC then asked him to broadcast summaries of the 1943 World Series. In 1944, Dunphy was selected to do the New York Yankees play-by-play over WINS, assisted by Al Schacht. However, Schacht, best known as a comic, acknowledged that he was not comfortable doing play-by-play, and he was soon replaced by Bill Slater, a former announcer on WOR Radio. Dunphy and Slater shared play-by-play duties throughout the 1944 baseball season.

In 1984, Dunphy was part of the American Sportscasters Association Hall of Fame's inaugural class which included sportscasting legends Red Barber, Ted Husing, Graham McNamee and Bill Stern. He was also a member of the organization's board of directors. He was elected in 1986 to the National Sportscasters and Sportswriters Association Hall of Fame.

Dunphy was inducted into the National Radio Hall of Fame in 1988 and had a cameo appearance in the 1971 Woody Allen movie Bananas. He appears as the commentator in the 1977 biopic of Muhammad Ali, "The Greatest". He also called all of the fights in the 1980 film Raging Bull. In 1982, he won the Sam Taub Award for Excellence in Broadcasting Journalism in boxing. He is a member of the International Boxing Hall of Fame.

Dunphy was a star track athlete and went on to graduate from Manhattan College in 1930. In 1984, he was inducted into the Manhattan College Athletic Hall of Fame.

His son, Don Dunphy Jr., was an executive producer of Eyewitness News on WABC-TV in New York City in its early years, and later became vice president of news services at ABC. His other son, Bob Dunphy, has been a director of Showtime Championship Boxing since 1989. In 2015 he directed the Mayweather-Pacquiao fight, the highest-grossing pay-per-view event in history.

He is buried in the Cemetery of the Holy Rood in Westbury, New York.

== Selected filmography ==
- Joe Frazier vs. Manuel Ramos (1968) – Himself – Ringside Commentator
- Mac Foster vs. Jerry Quarry (1970) – Himself – Ringside Commentator
- Dick Tiger vs. Emile Griffith (1970) – Himself – Ring Announcer
- Bananas (1971) – Don Dunphy
- Floyd Patterson vs. Oscar Bonavena (1972) – Himself – Ring Announcer
- Muhammad Ali vs. Joe Frazier III (1975) – Himself – Ringside Commentator
- The Greatest (1977) – Commentator
- Matilda (1978) – Ringside announcer
- Thomas Hearns vs. Pipino Cuevas (1980) – Himself – Ringside Commentator
- Raging Bull (1980) – Himself – Radio Announcer for Dauthuille Fight
- The Last Fight (1983) – Radio Fight Announcer
- The Fighter (2010) – Fight Announcer (final film role)
