= Bill Hanrahan =

American broadcaster (1918–1996)

William A. Hanrahan (September 14, 1918 – August 7, 1996) was an American radio and television announcer, perhaps best known as the "Voice of NBC News".

Hanrahan's broadcasting career dated back to the 1940s, when he worked at WELI radio in New Haven, Connecticut, and later went to WNHC radio (now WYBC) where he was a newscaster. By 1950, he had joined the announcing staff of NBC in New York. His radio announcing credits included Inheritance, The Eternal Light, Monitor, and a 1976 special called The First Fabulous Fifty which was a companion to the network's 50th anniversary television special, The First Fifty Years.

Hanrahan's early television credits include The Nat King Cole Show, for which he was one of the announcers during its short-lived 1956–57 run. He also did a few other entertainment-based shows over the years, including two December episodes of Saturday Night Live in 1981 (the December 5 episode with host Tim Curry and musical guest Meat Loaf and the December 12 episode with host Bill Murray and musical guests The Spinners and The Yale Whiffenpoofs) on which he substituted for Mel Brandt (who was hired to be an announcer for that season following the brief departure of Don Pardo).

His greatest notability came as announcer for numerous NBC News programs, including the Huntley-Brinkley Report and its successor, NBC Nightly News, until his retirement in 1983. He handled announcing duties for the network's coverage of political conventions, space launches, assassinations, and other major stories during his tenure. His voice became as familiar to a generation of viewers as those of fellow staff announcers Don Pardo, Bill Wendell, Wayne Howell, and Hanrahan's eventual successor as Nightly News announcer, Howard Reig.

Hanrahan died on August 7, 1996, in Fairfield, Connecticut, at the age of 77.
