= Big Wilson =

American radio personality (1924–1989)

- Born: Malcolm John Wilson Jr. October 3, 1924; Mariaville Lake, New York, U.S.
- Died: October 5, 1989 (aged 65); Selma, North Carolina, U.S.
- Other name: Big John Wilson
- Education: Ithaca College
- Occupations: Disc jockey, announcer, late-night movie host
- Known for: Announcer for Jack Horkheimer: Star Hustler
- Spouse: Jody
- Children: 1

Big Wilson (born Malcolm John Wilson Jr.; October 3, 1924 – October 5, 1989) was an American radio personality. He worked as a disc jockey at WNBC AM in New York City from the early 1960s until 1974 and moved to Miami in 1975 where he worked for WIOD and WCIX-TV.

Prior to moving to NYC, Wilson and his wife Jody lived in a riverfront home in Rocky River, Ohio. He commuted to KYW (AM) Radio Cleveland where he was the leading radio personality for some years, interviewing Tim Conway and other well-known persons at their homes.

Wilson was one of the last two hosts of the NBC network radio program Monitor.

Big Wilson also served as the announcer for the weekly television program, Jack Horkheimer: Star Hustler. Wilson's voice was heard reading the following poem during the program's opening sequence:

Some people hustle pool,

Some people hustle cars, But have you ever heard about

The man who hustles stars?

After Big Wilson's death in 1989, Star Hustler continued to use Wilson's pre-recorded voice in the television program's introduction as a "living memorial" to the man. This ended in 1997 when the show was renamed Jack Horkheimer: Star Gazer.

Wilson, who was 6 ft 6 in (1.98 m) tall, and weighed more than 300 pounds (140 kg), died from a heart attack, two days after his 65th birthday at a hotel in Selma, North Carolina. He was sometimes referred to in advertisements as "Mrs. Wilson's little boy 'Big'".

Big Wilson was known in south Florida for his TV hosting show, Night Owl Movies. On the show, Big Wilson would share his vast knowledge of classic films and television shows as well as music. He shared just enough snippets of information about the film that he was showing while sitting behind his piano, playing a few chords next to an owl plush perched on his piano. Wilson would have trivia questions about films or actors in the film that he was showing and would give out Night Owl t-shirts to the caller with the correct answer. The show aired from the late 1970's to the early 1990's and was a staple TV show for late sleepers or night owls.
