= Bill Stern =

American actor and sportscaster (1907–1971)

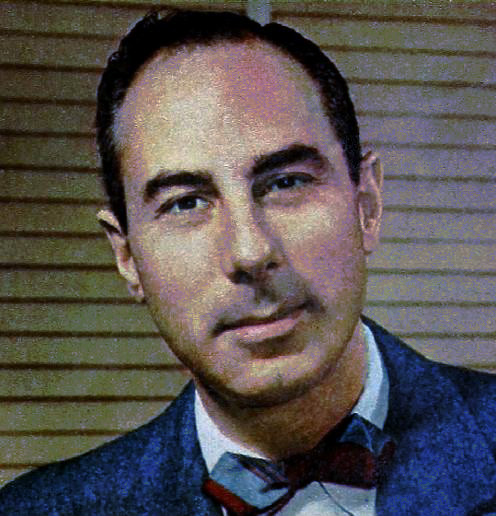
- Stern in 1949
- Born: July 1, 1907; Rochester, New York, U.S.
- Died: November 19, 1971 (aged 64); Rye, New York, U.S.
- Resting place: Mount Pleasant Cemetery, Hawthorne, New York
- Education: Pennsylvania Military College
- Occupations: Broadcaster, actor
- Spouse: Harriet May Sterne (d. 2006)

Signature
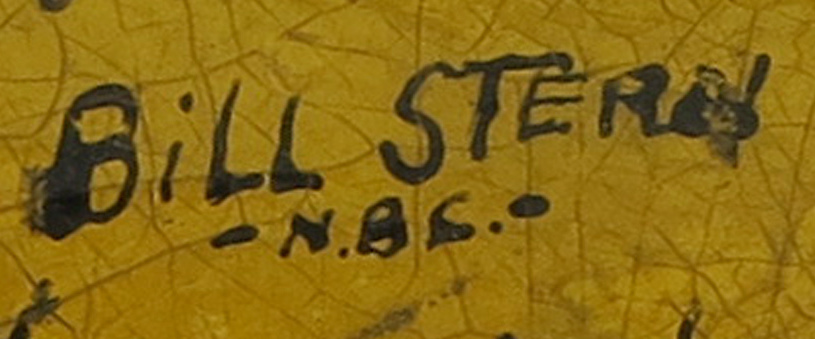

William Stern (July 1, 1907 – November 19, 1971) was an American actor and sportscaster who announced the nation's first remote sports broadcast and the first telecast of a baseball game. In 1984, Stern was part of the American Sportscasters Association Hall of Fame's inaugural class which included sportscasting legends Red Barber, Don Dunphy, Ted Husing and Graham McNamee. He was inducted into the National Radio Hall of Fame (1988) and has a star in the Hollywood Walk of Fame.

== Career ==
Born in Rochester, New York, Stern began doing radio play-by-play commentary in 1925, when he was hired by a local station, WHAM, to cover football games. Shortly after that, he enrolled at Pennsylvania Military College, graduating in 1930.

NBC hired him in 1937 to host The Colgate Sports Newsreel as well as Friday night boxing on radio. Stern was also one of the first televised boxing commentators.

He broadcast the first televised sporting event, the second game of a baseball doubleheader between Princeton and Columbia at Columbia's Baker Field on May 17, 1939. On September 30, he called the first televised football game.

During his most successful years, Stern engaged in a fierce rivalry with Ted Husing of the CBS Radio Network. They competed not only for broadcast position during sports and news events, but also for the rights to cover the events themselves. They both served for many years as their networks' sports directors as well as being on-air stars.

According to the book Sports on New York Radio by sportscaster and Westwood One executive David J. Halberstam, Stern's remarkable career flourished despite a physical handicap. In 1935, on his way home from a football game in Texas, the car Stern was in got into an accident, injuring him severely enough that his left leg had to be amputated just above the knee.

Some observers consider Stern's style a blueprint in the 1940s for the style of Paul Harvey, ABC Entertainment Network social commentator, who adapted both Stern's newscasting (transforming his Reel One to Page One) and his stories about the famous and odd (to Rest Of The Story), although Stern made no effort to authenticate his stories and, in later years, introduced that segment of his show by saying that they "might be actual, may be mythical, but definitely interesting." Harvey, on the other hand, said he told only stories he had authenticated in some way.

== Motion pictures ==
Stern occasionally appeared in feature films as himself. Two of his more familiar credits are The Pride of the Yankees, starring Gary Cooper, and Here Come the Co-Eds, starring Abbott and Costello. He also narrated a long-running series of 10-minute short subjects for Columbia Pictures, "Bill Stern's World of Sports." He also served as sports commentator for News of the Day newsreels, as he acknowledged in his signoff message on his Colgate Shave Cream Sports Newsreel of the Air over NBC Radio ("Until then, I'll be seeing you in the News of the Day newsreel at your favorite Loews or Associated theaters!"). The character "Bill Kern" in Woody Allen's "Radio Days" was a take on Stern's storytelling.

== Controversies ==
He caused a controversy on September 15, 1944, when he reported that a Chicago newspaper had broken word of some sort of arrangement for the St. Louis Browns of baseball's American League to lose their only World Series that year. He later expressed regret about writing the article; the Browns did lose the World Series that year, 4 games to 2, to their hometown rivals on their home field, Sportman's Park, which the Browns owned, but shared with the St. Louis Cardinals.

One day, while doing radio play-by-play for a football game, as a player broke away towards a long run for a touchdown, Stern misidentified the runner several times as he ran toward the goal. Noticing the error just before he crossed the goal line, Stern "corrected" himself by saying that the misidentified runner had lateraled the ball to the player who actually made the run and scored. Some time later, Clem McCarthy, that era's most prominent horse-racing announcer, described the wrong horse as having won a race. When the verbose and egotistical Stern chided him for this error, McCarthy replied, "You can't lateral a horse, Bill."

In 1949, Stern waded into "The Great Curveball Debate" about who invented the curveball in the 19th century, Candy Cummings or Fred Goldsmith. In his book of that year, Bill Stern's Favorite Baseball Stories, he came down solidly in Goldsmith's corner.

== Later years ==
After many years with NBC, he switched to ABC in 1953, where he lasted until 1956. While at ABC, Stern was a regular panelist on the game show The Name's the Same. Most of the program was played for laughs but Stern, with his reporter training, could always be counted on to ask shrewd, probing questions stressing the factual aspects of the show.

According to the Halberstam book, Stern's tenures at both networks were cut short due to health problems caused by his addiction to painkillers, which dated back to the period after his leg had been amputated.

After retiring from television broadcasting, Stern did radio sports reports and commentaries for the Mutual Broadcasting System in the late 1950s and 1960s. He lived the last 15 years of his life in Rye, New York.

== In popular culture ==
An overheard Bill Stern radio broadcast has brief significance in the 1951, Nero Wolfe detective novel, Murder by the Book, by Rex Stout.
