= Peg Lynch =

American actress

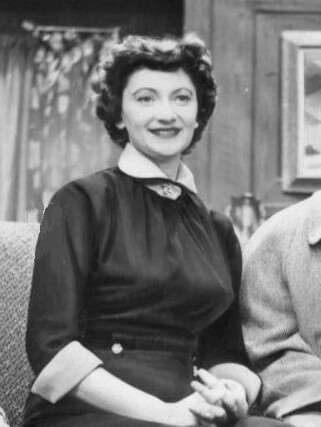
- Lynch in Ethel and Albert, 1954
- Born: Margaret Frances Lynch; November 25, 1916; Lincoln, Nebraska, U.S.
- Died: July 24, 2015 (aged 98); Becket, Massachusetts, U.S.
- Occupations: Actress, writer
- Website: www.peglynch.com

Margaret Frances "Peg" Lynch (November 25, 1916 – July 24, 2015) was an American writer, actress, and sitcom creator. The BBC dubbed her, “the woman who invented sitcom”.

Lynch created the radio and television sitcoms Ethel and Albert, The Couple Next Door, and The Little Things in Life.

She created, wrote, starred in, and owned her own sitcom and she retained that ownership throughout her life. She wrote over 11,000 scripts for radio and television.

== Early life ==
Lynch was born in Lincoln, Nebraska. Her father died of the Spanish flu when she was two years old, after which she and her mother moved back to Kasson, Minnesota, where her mother resumed her job as an orthopedic nurse at the Mayo Clinic. When she was ten years old she won a writing competition in a local newspaper.

Lynch graduated from the University of Minnesota in 1937, majoring in English with an emphasis on writing and dramatics.

== Radio ==
Lynch's start in radio began at age 15 when working part-time as a receptionist at the Mayo Clinic. She agreed to help out at KROC in Rochester, a radio station belonging to a classmate's father. At KROC she helped with writing copy and interviewing celebrities who were in town (usually to visit the Clinic) including Lou Gehrig, Jeanette MacDonald, Knute Rockne and Ernest Hemingway. Soon after she graduated from college, she landed a job at KATE in Albert Lea, Minnesota, about 40 miles southwest of Rochester. She earned $65 per month as a copywriter. She wrote commercials, a daily half-hour woman's show, a weekly half-hour theater show, a weekly farm news program, and three 10-minute plays and two five-minute sketches per week.

== Ethel and Albert ==
It was at KATE Radio that Lynch first introduced the husband and wife characters of Ethel and Albert, born as a three-minute "filler" sketch in her woman's show. The sketch was successful and adapted to sell products on the show. Lynch played Ethel and a station announcer played Albert.

After four months at KATE, Lynch moved to WCHV in Charlottesville, Virginia, and then on to WTBO in Cumberland, Maryland, in 1941, continuing to develop Ethel and Albert as she went, expanding it at WTBO into a five-times-per-week, 15-minute evening feature. Willis Conover played Albert.

In February 1944, Lynch moved to New York City. Within a month, she received an offer from NBC radio to air her show. Lynch refused because it would require her to give up the ownership rights of Ethel and Albert. Shortly after, she received an offer for a spot on Blue Network. On April 17, 1944, Ethel and Albert was reborn as a five-day-a-week, 15-minute show on national radio. Lynch was asked to play Ethel, which she initially refused to do; however, after several actresses were auditioned and none found suitable, Lynch was signed to play the role. Richard Widmark played the role of Albert for six months, followed by Alan Bunce. Bunce co-starred with Lynch for the next twenty years in both Ethel and Albert, and as their radio counterparts in The Couple Next Door. The partnership lasted until Bunce died in 1965.

Ethel and Albert continued as a fifteen-minute show until 1949, when it expanded to a half-hour.

The show moved into commercial television in 1950 as a ten-minute segment on The Kate Smith Hour, and in April 1953 became a half-hour program on the NBC network. The show was well received by both the public and the critics. Margaret Hamilton was a friend of Lynch's and appeared regularly on the show, playing Albert's aunt. Kay Gardella of the New York Daily News wrote that Ethel and Albert was "generally regarded as the top domestic comedy on TV. The warm, realistic portrayals and situations of this stanza reflect the personality of its creator. Peg is completely down to earth, and so are her scripts". Jack Gould of The New York Times, has given credit to the show and its creator-writer when he wrote, "the author of Ethel and Albert, of course, is Miss Lynch herself. She has lost none of her uncanny knack for catching the small situation in married life and developing it into a gem of quiet humor. The charm of Ethel and Albert is that they could be man and wife off the screen."

NBC cancelled Ethel and Albert in December 1954. The show was picked up by CBS as the 1955 summer replacement for the Spring Byington vehicle December Bride, and it was so popular that Lynch was offered her half-hour prime-time slot (sponsored by Maxwell House). Ethel and Albert gained a devoted following across America, and in the fall of 1955, the show again switched networks, this time to ABC, sponsored by Ralston Purina. It remained there until May 1956. Lynch owned the rights to her program, and it was not limited to a single network. Ethel and Albert aired for the final time on television on May 25, 1956. However, the show continued on CBS radio, starting in 1957, with The Couple Next Door as its new title. Lynch and Bunce continued in the title roles, and Lynch remained as the show's sole writer. The Couple Next Door had a three-year run in a 15-minute five-day-a-week format, ending in 1960. AT&T brought the couple back in a 1961 instructional semi-animated video called Mr. Digit and the Battle of Bubbling Brook that focused on all-numeric dialing. Ethel and Albert enjoyed revivals in 1963–64 on NBC Radio's Monitor with Bunce as Albert and in National Public Radio's Earplay in 1973.

In 1975–76 Lynch wrote and starred in The Little Things in Life for Radio Playhouse with Bob Dryden in the role of Albert. Six episodes of Ethel and Albert were adapted by Granada Television in Manchester, England, in 1979, titled Chintz and with a British cast.

Lynch continued to perform her comedy shows at Old Time Radio Conventions around the US up to 2013.

== Private life ==
Lynch married Odd Knut Ronning (1918–2014), a Norwegian pulp and paper engineer in Manhattan on August 12, 1948. The couple had a daughter, Astrid Ronning King, who is also a writer https://astridronningking.substack.com and is married to composer Denis King. Lynch lived in Becket, Massachusetts, and continued to write, revisiting the characters of Ethel and Albert as a couple in their nineties. She died on July 24, 2015, in Becket at the age of 98, following a sudden decline in health.
