= Monitor (radio program) =

American NBC network weekend broadcast (1955–1975)

- Monitor host Dave Garroway
- Running time: 40 hours per weekend (1955); 32 hours per weekend (1955–1957); 32 hours per weekend plus 2 live hours per Friday (1957–1959); 32 hours per weekend plus 2 live hours daily (1959–1961); 16 hours per weekend (1961–1974); 12 hours per weekend (1974–1975)
- Country of origin: United States
- Home station: NBC Radio, weekends (1955–1975); NBC Radio, Fridays (1957–1961); NBC Radio, daily (1959–1961)
- Hosted by: Various (see below)
- Created by: Sylvester L. Weaver
- Original release: June 12, 1955 – January 26, 1975
- No. of series: 20
- No. of episodes: ~20,000+ live hours of programming

Monitor was an American weekend radio program broadcast live and nationwide on the NBC Radio Network from June 12, 1955, until January 26, 1975. It began originally on Saturday morning at 8am and continued through the weekend until 12 midnight on Sunday. After the first few months, the full weekend broadcast was shortened when the midnight-to-dawn hours were dropped since few NBC stations carried it.

The program offered a magazine-of-the-air mix of news, sports, comedy, variety, music, celebrity interviews and other short segments (along with records, usually of popular middle-of-the-road songs, especially in its later years). Its length and eclectic format were radical departures from the traditional radio programming structure of 30- and 60-minute programs and represented an ambitious attempt to respond to the rise of television as America's major home-entertainment medium.

The show was the brainchild of Sylvester (Pat) Weaver, whose career bridged classic radio and television's infancy and who sought to keep radio alive in a television age. Believing that broadcasting could and should educate as well as entertain, Weaver fashioned a series to do both with some of the best-remembered and best-regarded names in broadcasting, entertainment, journalism, and literature taking part. Monitor and the Sunday-afternoon TV documentary series Wide Wide World were Weaver's last two major contributions to NBC, as he left the network within a year of Monitor's premiere.

== Monitor Beacon ==
The enduring audio signature of the show was the "Monitor Beacon" - a mix of audio-manipulated telephone tones and the sound of an oscillator emitting the Morse code signal for the letter "M", for "Monitor". It was described by one source as "a tape loop made from a sequence of 1950s AT&T telephone line switching tones generated by analog oscillators".

The Beacon introduced the show and was used in transitions, for example, to station breaks, accompanied by the tag line: "You're on the Monitor beacon."

== Anchors and hosts ==
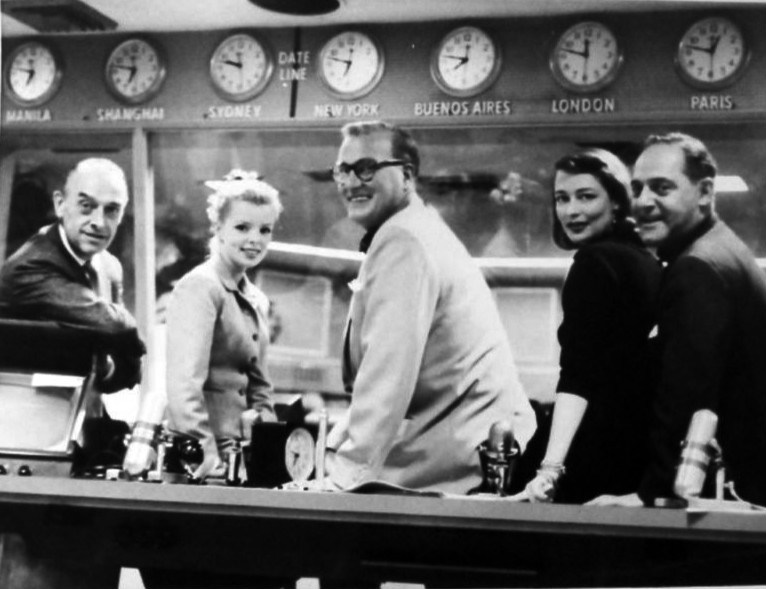
Monitor Sunday afternoon and evening staff in Radio Central, 1957. From left: Frank Gallop, Lorna Lynn (Monitor Medley Girl), Dave Garroway, Tedi Thurman (Miss Monitor), and Ben Grauer.

When Monitor began on June 12, 1955, at 4pm, the first hour of the program was simulcast on NBC-TV. That initial June 12 broadcast lasted eight hours, from 4pm through 12 midnight. Following the Monitor beacon, Morgan Beatty was the first voice ever heard on Monitor. After an introduction by Pat Weaver, news headlines by Dave Garroway and a routine by Bob and Ray, Garroway cued Monitor's opening music remote: live jazz by Howard Rumsey and the Lighthouse All-Stars at the Lighthouse Café in Hermosa Beach, California. It was the first of many jazz remotes in the weeks to come.

On the following Saturday, June 18, Monitor began broadcasting 40 consecutive hours each weekend, from 8am on Saturday to midnight on Sunday. Monitor aired from a mammoth NBC studio called Radio Central, created especially for the program, on the fifth floor of the RCA Building in midtown Manhattan (the same space which is now home to MSNBC). NBC unveiled Radio Central to the national television audience during a segment in the October 16, 1955 premiere of Wide Wide World, including a Monitor interview with Alfred Hitchcock (seen through glass in an adjacent studio and minus audio) and a Monitor newscast (with audio). Built at a cost of $150,000 the glass-enclosed studios of Radio Central were described by Pat Weaver as "a listening post of the world".

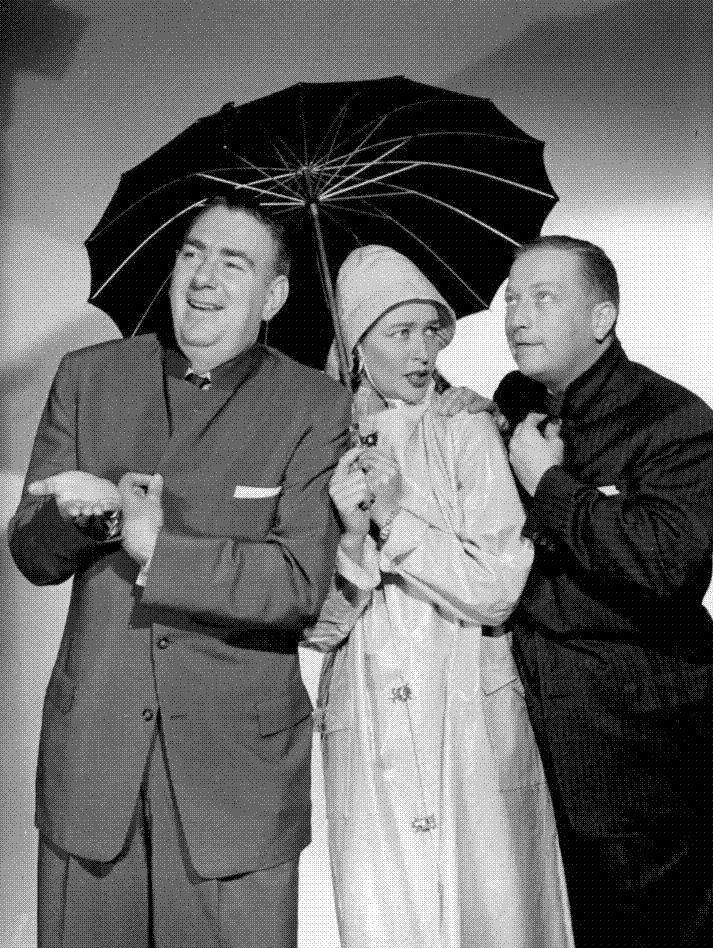
Monitor publicity shot of Tedi Thurman as Miss Monitor with Bob Elliott (right) and Ray Goulding.

From Radio Central, anchors and hosts, initially dubbed "communicators", presided over three or four-hour segments of the show. As well-known entertainment and broadcasting figures, they gave Monitor an impressive marquee. Cindy Adams, Johnny Andrews, Jim Backus, Red Barber, Frank Blair, Bruce Bradley, David Brinkley, Ed Bryce, Art Buchwald, Al "Jazzbo" Collins, Brad Crandall, Bill Cullen, James Daly, Jerry Damon, Dan Daniel, Hugh Downs, Frank Gallop, Dave Garroway, Peter Hackes, Bill Hanrahan, Bill Hayes, Bob Haymes, Candy Jones, Durward Kirby, Jim Lowe, Frank McGee, Barry Nelson, Leon Pearson, Tony Randall, Peter Roberts, Ted Steele, John Cameron Swayze, Tony Taylor and David Wayne were all communicators during the 20-year run.

Many hosts and announcers of game shows were also communicators, including Mel Allen, Ted Brown, Bill Cullen, Hugh Downs, Clifton Fadiman, Art Fleming, Art Ford, Allen Funt, Joe Garagiola, Ben Grauer, Monty Hall, Wayne Howell, Walter Kiernan, Hal March, Ed McMahon, Garry Moore, Henry Morgan, Bert Parks, Gene Rayburn, Don Russell and John Bartholomew Tucker.

In later years Don Imus, Murray the K, Robert W. Morgan and Wolfman Jack helmed the Saturday evening segment until it was eliminated. The last hosts of Monitor in 1975 were Big Wilson and John Bartholomew Tucker. Behind the scenes, Monitor's executive producers included Jim Fleming, Frank Papp, Al Capstaff and Bob Maurer.

== Features and personalities ==
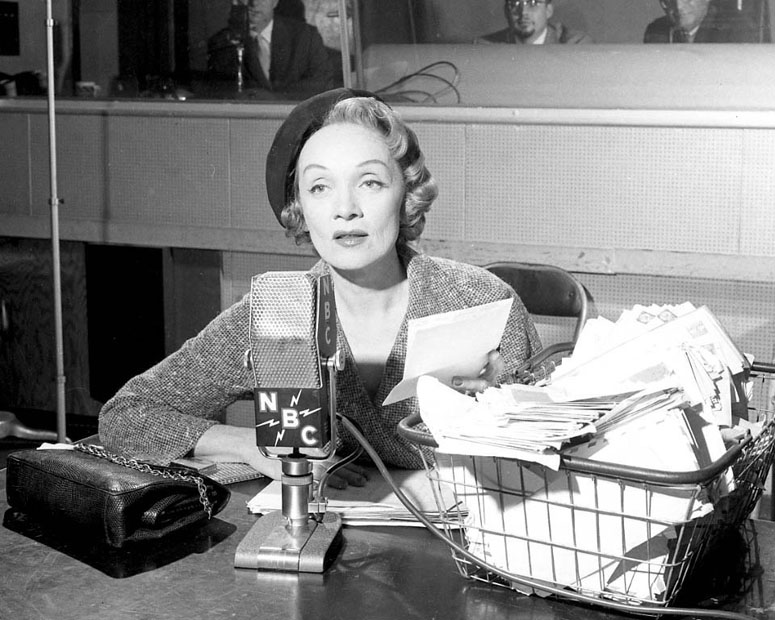
Marlene Dietrich was a regular Monitor advisor on emotional problems.

Remote segments originating from locations around the country were a regular part of Monitor, setting it apart from studio-bound broadcasts and taking advantage of network radio's reach. A weekend might include reports from a festival in Tucson, a golf championship in North Carolina, NBC's correspondent in Moscow, or on preparations for the Olympic Games in Melbourne, Australia.

Regular segments included "Celebrity Chef", "Ring Around the World", and "On the Line with Bob Considine". On-the-spot live remote broadcasts from New York City jazz clubs on Saturday evenings included both jazz groups and vocalists, such as Al Hibbler.

In the show's early years, weather reports were delivered in a breathy, sexy voice by actress Tedi Thurman in the role of Miss Monitor. Various broadcasting personalities were heard delivering reports and segments included Jerry Baker (the Master Gardener), Morgan Beatty, Joyce Brothers, Al Capp, Paul Christman, Marlene Dietrich, Len Dillon, Chris Economaki, Arlene Francis, Betty Furness, Curt Gowdy, Skitch Henderson, Chet Huntley, Graham Kerr (the Galloping Gourmet), Joe Kirkwood, Jr., Fran Koltun; Sandy Koufax, Bill Mazer, Lindsey Nelson, Kyle Rote, Gene Shalit, Jim Simpson, Barbara Walters, Tony Zappone and many NBC News correspondents.

== Comedy ==
Many comedy talents appeared through the years including Woody Allen, Bill Cosby, Selma Diamond, Phyllis Diller, Bob Hope, Ernie Kovacs, Bob Newhart, Jean Shepherd and Jonathan Winters. The comedy team of Mike Nichols and Elaine May appeared on Monitor, as did Jerry Stiller and Anne Meara. Bob and Ray, who won a 1957 Peabody Award for their Monitor comedy routines, often remained at NBC during the weekend to step in if technical problems developed with remote segments.

Peg Lynch wrote and performed Ethel and Albert for Monitor from 1963 to 1965.

In addition to Bob and Ray, several Monitor regulars in its early years helped the show bridge the classic and modern radio eras. Henry Morgan had been a controversial radio comedian in the 1940s. Clifton Fadiman was the legendary host of Information Please, the highbrow quiz show. Mel Allen and Red Barber were familiar baseball voices (respectively, the New York Yankees and the Brooklyn Dodgers) since the 1940s. Garry Moore rose to fame as Jimmy Durante's radio sidekick. Bert Parks was host of the radio hits Stop the Music and Break the Bank.

Several radio comedy shows were revived in the form of regular five-minute Monitor segments, including Duffy's Tavern. Jim and Marian Jordan, better known as old-time radio favorites Fibber McGee and Molly, held down a regular Monitor segment and were said to be negotiating a new, long-term commitment to the show when Marian died of cancer in 1961. Peg Lynch and Alan Bunce, vintage radio's Ethel and Albert, also performed five-minute Monitor vignettes from 1963 to 1965. Lynch made several of the vignettes available on compact disc for OTR collectors.

In the mid-1950s, Monitor began broadcasting reruns of the British the Goon Show with Spike Milligan, Harry Secombe, Peter Sellers, and Michael Bentine. The American comedy troupe the Firesign Theatre cited these broadcasts as a major influence on their style of comedy.^{:4,5,61}

== Later years ==
The innovative approach of Monitor made it a profitable success for NBC Radio over many years, helping to sustain the network in an era when network radio was collapsing. Its strong start and high popularity led the show to air on Friday nights from 8pm to 10pm in 1957, followed by an expansion to weeknights in 1959, all in addition to its 32 weekend hours (reduced from 40 in late 1955).

By 1961, the weeknight Monitor was gone and the weekend schedule cut in half - from 32 to 16 hours each weekend. This was not quite as drastic a cut as it seems, as some programming that had been counted as part of Monitor's 32 hours—such as Sunday morning religious broadcasts and the radio version of Meet the Press—continued to air on NBC outside of the Monitor schedule. This was further shortened in 1974 to only 12 live weekend hours (plus nine repeated hours).

Radio stations, especially in large markets, had increasingly adopted personality-driven formats featuring local disc jockeys and sought to establish a clear-cut musical or talk identity for themselves. Because of this, Monitor's "something-for-everyone" programming often did not fit in with schedules and viewpoints of stations, and fewer affiliates carried the program in major markets. Due to this, many of the show's sponsors also pulled away, requiring a shortening of the schedule to keep costs low.

NBC refused to get rid of its biggest money-making show without a fight. The network introduced new music formats and changed hosts. It hired Don Imus, Wolfman Jack and Robert W. Morgan to alternate on Saturday-night segments in an attempt to make the format faster-paced. NBC also created a "custom package" to allow stations to carry certain portions as they saw fit.

Despite NBC's efforts, it appeared that Monitor's time had come and gone. The network finally gave up fighting the trend by Fall 1974 and simply continued planning and programming the show's six-hour blocks for each Saturday and Sunday, now reduced between 6 p.m. and midnight on Saturdays and noon and 6 p.m. on Sundays.

=== The final weekend ===
On January 25 and 26, 1975, Monitor spent its last 12 hours looking back on its 20-year history of more than 20,000-plus hours with hosts Big Wilson and John Bartholomew Tucker. Many clips were played, including Dave Garroway's interview with Marilyn Monroe on the show's first day, Frank McGee's talk with Martin Luther King Jr. in the early 1960s, Bob and Ray spoofing "Miss Monitor," and reporter Helen Hall riding on a roller-coaster.

On January 26, Wilson hosted from noon to 3pm while Tucker hosted from 3 to 6pm. The program's last guest was Hugh Downs, who talked about his earlier days on Monitor with Tucker. During the show's final minutes Sammy Cahn sang about the show's history ("Monitor: It's Been a Long, Long Time"), followed by Tucker thanking the listeners and staff, after which he said his last farewell. The final sound heard on Monitor was of the "Beacon", followed by the NBC chimes at 5:58:50pm.

About 125 stations still carried the program on its last day, with few in major markets.

In 1983, NBC revived the title for a television news program, Monitor, hosted by Lloyd Dobyns. The show was renamed First Camera before being canceled in 1984.

== Listen to ==
- Monitor clips, including the Beacon
- NPR: Liane Hansen talks with Dennis Hart on the 50th anniversary of Monitor (6/12/05)
- Miss Monitor (Tedi Thurman) (RealPlayer)
- Monitor (June 6, 1959, 11am to noon ET, Saturday) with Bob and Ray, Ernie Kovacs, Miss Monitor, Bob Wilson, Monty Hall, Herb Kaplow, Longines Chorus and Orchestra, segment on airline ticketing via "electronic brain" in Copenhagen (MP3 format)
- "Miss Janitor", the Joy Boys' parody of Miss Monitor (February 10, 1961) (MP3 format)
- Monitor: Nichols and May (September 1964) (MP3 format)

== See also ==
- Radio in the United States

== Notes ==
- Hart, Dennis. Monitor (Take 2): The Revised, Expanded Inside Story of Network Radio's Greatest Program. 297 pages. New York: iUniverse, 2003. ISBN 0-595-28177-X
