= Wacky Jacks =

1994 video game

- Developer: Zenda Studio
- Publisher: StarCore
- Platforms: Windows; Macintosh
- Release: 1994

Wacky Jacks is a 1994 video game from Zenda Studio. The game features the voice of Don Pardo and is for ages 7 and up.

== Gameplay ==
Wacky Jacks is a whimsical, game-show-inspired CD-ROM game that blends lighthearted competition with educational flair. Players are greeted by the booming voice of an announcer as they dive into four distinct mini-games: Slap Happy, a timed matching challenge; Zingers, which fuses true-or-false trivia with tic-tac-toe mechanics; Blankety Blank, a playful spin on Hangman; and Scramblers, a visual puzzle that requires reconstructing jumbled images. Beyond the games, the Album section offers a gallery of quirky pictures and factoids. Each cartoon contestant operates at one of three difficulty levels—Rookie, Trooper, or Master—allowing both children and adults to find an appropriate challenge. The gameplay encourages memory development and fact retention, making it as much a learning tool as a source of entertainment.

== Development ==
The game was announced in November 1993 by StarCore along with six other titles for Macintosh. A Windows version was released in May 1994.

== Reception ==
Reception

Review score
Publication	Score
CD-ROM Today	4/5

Chris McGowan from Billboard magazine said "Wacky Jacks" will lure many children away from their hunt-and-kill video games and provide hours of entertainment"

CD-ROM Today said "Entertaining and educational, Wacky Jacks is a great way for families to spend some quality time together"

The game was given a silver medal at the NewMedia Invision Multimedia Awards.
