= Alan Bunce =

American actor (1900–1965)

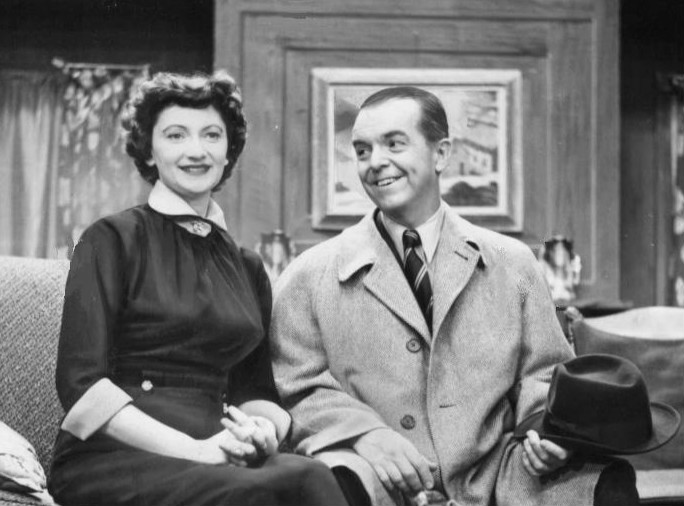
- Bunce with Peg Lynch as Ethel and Albert, 1954.
- Born: Alan Coe Bunce; June 28, 1900; Westfield, New Jersey, U.S.
- Died: April 27, 1965 (aged 64); New York City, U.S.
- Occupation: Actor
- Years active: 1930–1963
- Spouse: Ruth Elizabeth Nugent (m. 1924)
- Children: 3

Alan Coe Bunce (June 28, 1900 – April 27, 1965) was an American radio and television actor.

Bunce was best remembered for playing the role of Albert Arbuckle alongside Peg Lynch on the sitcom Ethel and Albert from 1944 to 1950 on radio and from 1953 to 1956 on television. Bunce was also remembered as the first actor to portray physician Jerry Malone on radio's Young Doctor Malone in the early 1940s.

== Early life ==
Alan Coe Bunce was born on June 28, 1900, in Westfield, New Jersey. His year of birth had been the subject of dispute, with varying sources citing 1902, 1903, and 1908. However, according to the Bunce family papers which were published publicly in 2008 by Bunce's grandson Andrew Bunce, the Bunce family has found evidence and have accepted Bunce's birth date to be June 28, 1900.

Bunce's year of birth is given as 1900 on his U.S. World War I Draft Registration Card (1917–18) Bunce's age is given as 39 in the United States Census of 1940 (enumerated on April 27, 1940).

Bunce the youngest of three children born to Theodore Dwight Bunce, an inventor, and Alice Edwards Bunce. His mother died when Bunce was a young boy. He graduated from a high school in Melrose, Massachusetts, in 1918.

== Career ==
Bunce's career began in the early 1930s with small roles in several films and guest appearances on several radio programs. Bunce did not get household recognition until 1939 when he began playing the role of Dr. Jerry Malone, the young physician who dispensed prescriptions and advice to the folks of Three Oaks on the medical drama Young Doctor Malone. He left the program in 1944.

The same year Bunce left Young Doctor Malone, he replaced film star Richard Widmark in the role of working-class man Albert Arbuckle, the male lead on Peg Lynch's Ethel and Albert. Lynch played the female lead and Albert's wife Ethel Arbuckle. Bunce remained with the radio show for its entire six year run.

Bunce played New York State Governor Al Smith in "Sunrise at Campobello" about President Franklin Delano Roosevelt's early battle with polio and return to public life during the 1924 Democratic convention where Roosevelt walked ten steps to the podium and stood for 45 minutes to nominate the Governor for president.

Bunce broke into television in 1950 with a guest star appearance of the ABC anthology series The Clock. Bunce's "Albert Arbuckle" character also moved to television starting with appearances on The Kate Smith Hour beginning in 1952. This led to the premiere of the televised version of Ethel and Albert on NBC April 25, 1953. The show stayed on NBC until Christmas Day, 1954. It moved to CBS on June 20, 1955, and stayed there until September 26, 1955, serving as a summer replacement for December Bride and ended its television life on ABC where it aired from October 14, 1955 – July 6, 1956.

Bunce was a ranking officer in the American Federation of Radio Artists, formed in 1937, and in 1952 was elected the first president of the newly formed, American Federation of Radio and Television Artists, after merging that same year with the Television Authority, until 1954.

In his later career, Bunce appeared on episodes of Perry Mason, The United States Steel Hour, The Patty Duke Show and The Nurses. His last appearance on television was on a 1965 episode of The Defenders.

== Family ==
Bunce married Ruth Elizabeth Nugent, an actress, in 1924. Nugent was born in Ohio and was the daughter of John Charles "J.C." Nugent and Grace Mary (née Fertig). J.C. Nugent was the father of actor Elliott Nugent. Her father was an actor, as well as a playwright and commentator for Variety.

== Death ==
Bunce died at Columbia-Presbyterian Medical Center on April 27, 1965, from an undisclosed cause at age 64. He is interred in Long Ridge Union Cemetery, Stamford, Connecticut.

== Filmography ==
Year	Title	Role	Notes
1930	She's My Weakness	Bernard Norton	
1959	The Last Mile	Warden Stone	
1960	Sunrise at Campobello	Gov. Alfred E. Smith	
1961	Homicidal	Doctor Jonas	
