= Red Barber =

American radio broadcaster, television broadcaster, sportscaster (1908–1992)

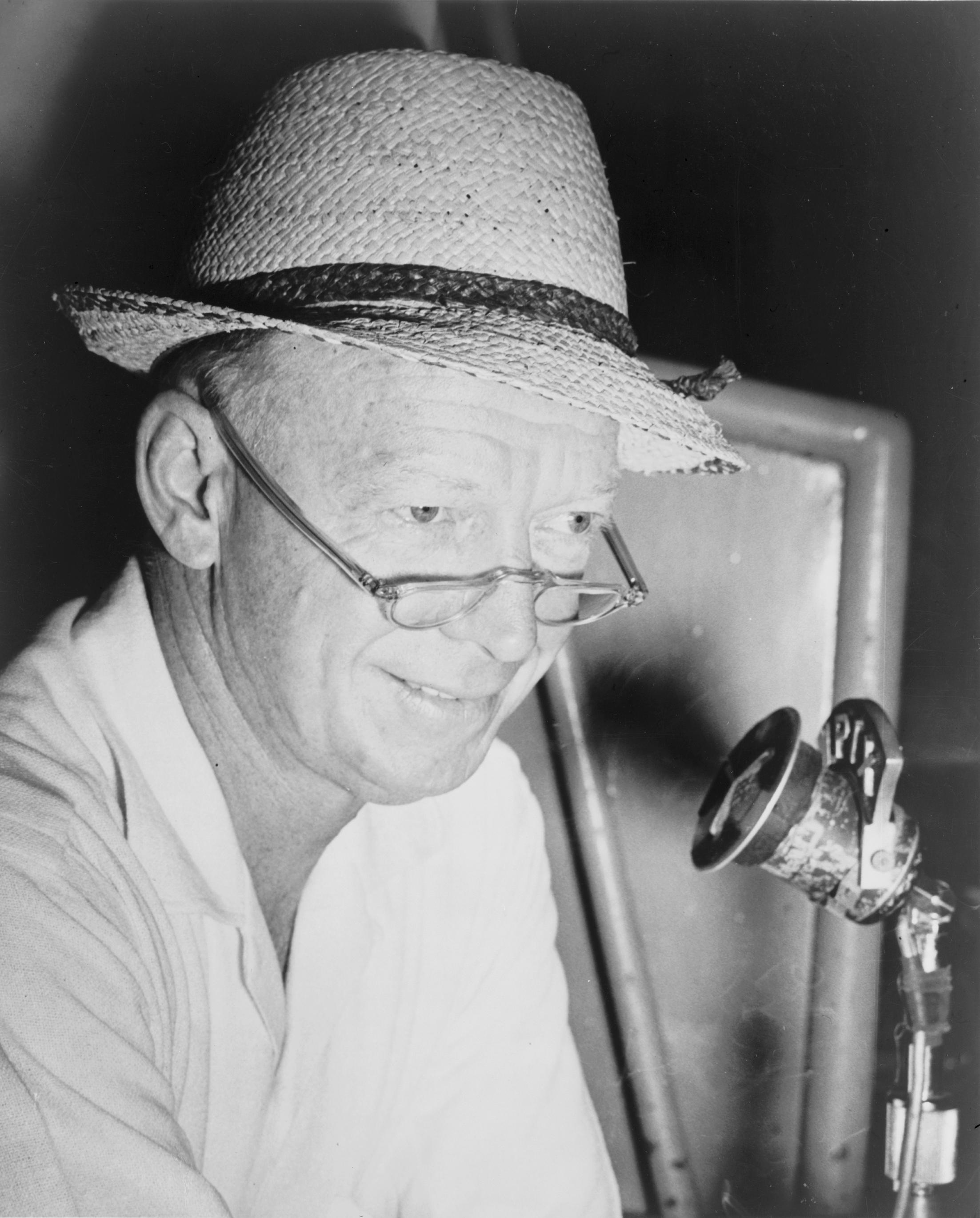
- Barber in 1955
- Born: Walter Lanier Barber; February 17, 1908; Columbus, Mississippi, U.S.
- Died: October 22, 1992 (aged 84); Tallahassee, Florida, U.S.
- Other name: The Ol' Redhead
- Education: University of Florida
- Occupation: Sports announcer
- Spouse: Lylah Scarborough (m. 1931)
- Children: 1
- Awards: Ford C. Frick Award (1978)
- Sports commentary career
- Teams: Cincinnati Reds (1934–38); Brooklyn Dodgers (1939–53); New York Yankees (1954–66)
- Genre: Play-by-play
- Sport: Major League Baseball

Walter Lanier "Red" Barber (February 17, 1908 – October 22, 1992) was an American sports announcer and author. Nicknamed "The Ol' Redhead", he was primarily identified with broadcasts of Major League Baseball, calling play-by-play across four decades with the Cincinnati Reds (1934–1938), Brooklyn Dodgers (1939–1953), and New York Yankees (1954–1966). Like his fellow sportscasting pioneer Mel Allen, Barber also developed a niche calling college and professional American football in his primary market of New York City.

== Biography ==
=== Early years ===
Barber was born in Columbus, Mississippi. He was a distant relative of poet Sidney Lanier and writer Thomas Lanier Williams. The family moved to Sanford, Florida in 1918, and at the age of 21, he hitchhiked to Gainesville and enrolled at the University of Florida, majoring in education. During Barber's first year, he worked at various jobs including part-time janitor at the University Club. It was there in January 1930 that Barber got his start in broadcasting.

An agriculture professor had been scheduled to appear on WRUF, the university radio station, to read a scholarly paper over the air. When the professor's absence was discovered minutes before the broadcast was to begin, janitor Barber was called in as a substitute. It was thus that the future sportscaster's first gig was reading "Certain Aspects of Bovine Obstetrics". After those few minutes in front of a microphone, Barber decided to switch careers. He became WRUF's director and chief announcer and covered Florida Gators football games that autumn. Then he dropped out of school to focus on his radio work. After four more years at WRUF, he landed a job broadcasting the Cincinnati Reds on WLW and WSAI when Powel Crosley Jr. purchased the team in 1934.

On Opening Day 1934 (April 17), Barber attended his first major league game and broadcast its play-by-play, as the Reds lost to the Chicago Cubs, 6–0. He called games from the stands of Cincinnati's renamed Crosley Field for the next five seasons.

=== Brooklyn Dodgers ===
Barber had been hired by Larry MacPhail, then president of the Reds. MacPhail became president of the Dodgers in 1938, and in 1939, he brought the play-by-play man to the Dodgers. In Brooklyn, Barber became an institution, widely admired for his folksy style. He was also appreciated by people concerned about Brooklyn's reputation as a land of "dees" and "dems".

Barber became famous for his signature catchphrases, including these:

- "They're tearin' up the pea patch" – used for a team on a winning streak.
- "The bases are F.O.B. (full of Brooklyns)" – indicating the Dodgers had loaded the bases.
- "Can of corn" – describing a softly hit, easily caught fly ball.
- "Rhubarb" – any kind of heated on-field dispute or altercation.
- "Sittin' in the catbird seat" – used when a player or team was performing exceptionally well.
- "Walkin' in the tall cotton" – also used to describe success.
- "Slicker than boiled okra" – describing a ball that a fielder was unable to get a grip on.
- "Easy as a bank of fog" – describing the graceful movement of a fielder.
- "Tighter than a new pair of shoes on a rainy day" – describing a closely contested game.
- "Tied up in a croker sack" – describing a one-sided game where the outcome was all but decided.

To further his image as a Southern gentleman, Barber would often identify players as "Mister", "big fella", or "old" (regardless of the player's age):

- "Now, Mister Reiser steps to the plate, batting at .344."
- "Big fella Hatten pitches, it's in there for strike one."
- "Old number 13, Ralph Branca, coming in to pitch."

A number of play-by-play announcers including Chris Berman have adopted his use of "back, back, back" to describe a long fly ball with potential to be a home run. Those other announcers are describing the flight of the ball but Barber was describing the outfielder in this famous call from Game 6 of the 1947 World Series. Joe DiMaggio was the batter:

- "Here's the pitch, swung on, belted ... it's a long one ... back goes Gionfriddo, back, back, back, back, back, back ... heeee makes a one-handed catch against the bullpen! Oh, Doctor!"

The phrase "Oh, Doctor" was also picked up by some later sportscasters, most notably Jerry Coleman, who was a New York Yankee infielder during the 1940s and 1950s and later worked alongside Barber in the Yankees' radio and TV booths.

In Game 4 of that same 1947 Series, Barber memorably described Cookie Lavagetto's ninth-inning hit to break up Bill Bevens' no-hitter and win the game at once:

- "Wait a minute ... Stanky is being called back from the plate and Lavagetto goes up to hit ... Gionfriddo walks off second ... Miksis off first ... They're both ready to go on anything ... Two men out, last of the ninth ... the pitch ... swung on, there's a drive hit out toward the right field corner. Henrich is going back. He can't get it! It's off the wall for a base hit! Here comes the tying run, and here comes the winning run! ... Friends, they're killin' Lavagetto... his own teammates... they're beatin' him to pieces and it's taking a police escort to get Lavagetto away from the Dodgers! ... Well, I'll be a suck-egg mule!"

In 1939, Barber broadcast the first major-league game on television, on experimental NBC station W2XBS. In 1946, he added to his Brooklyn duties a job as sports director of the CBS Radio Network, succeeding Ted Husing and continuing through 1955. There, his greatest contribution was to conceive and host the CBS Football Roundup, which switched listeners back and forth between broadcasts of different regional college games each week.

Barber called Dodgers broadcasts over New York radio station WHN (later WMGM) at 1050 on the AM dial, teaming with Al Helfer from 1939 to 1941, followed by Alan Hale in 1942 and Connie Desmond beginning in 1943. When he developed a severe bleeding ulcer in 1948 and had to take a leave of absence from broadcasting for several weeks, Dodgers president Branch Rickey arranged for Ernie Harwell, the announcer for the minor-league Atlanta Crackers, to be sent to Brooklyn as Barber's substitute; in exchange, Cliff Dapper, the catcher for the Dodgers' farm team in Montreal, was permitted to go to Atlanta to serve as the Crackers' new player-manager, thereby effecting the first player-for-announcer "trade" in major league history. Harwell would remain as a third man in the Dodgers' booth with Barber and Desmond through the 1949 season.

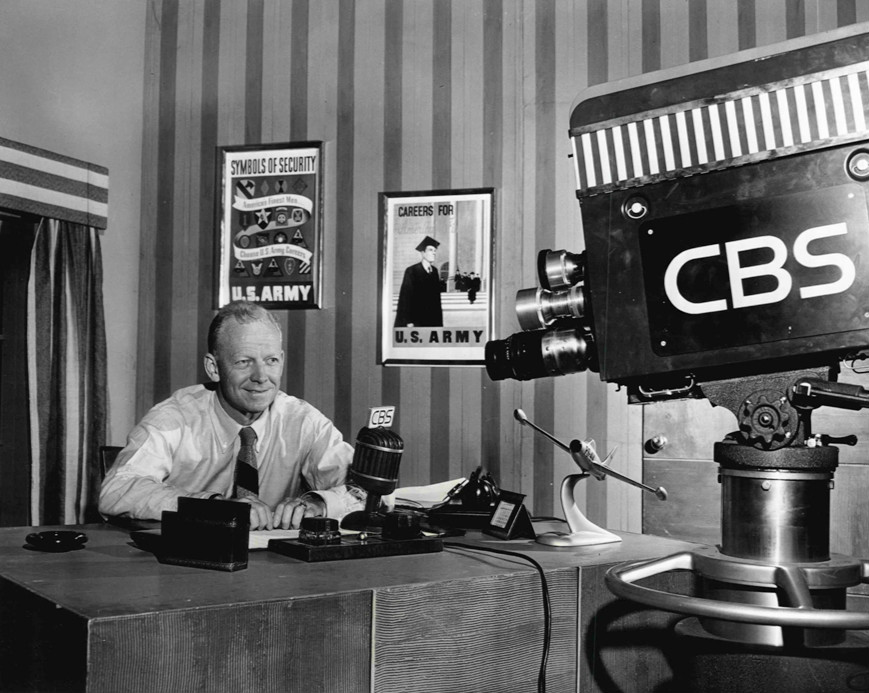
As head of CBS Sports and host of his television program, Red Barber's Club House, 1949.

While running CBS Sports, Barber became the mentor of another redheaded announcer. He recruited the Fordham University graduate Vin Scully for CBS football coverage, and eventually invited him into the Dodgers' broadcast booth to succeed Harwell in 1950 after the latter's departure for the crosstown New York Giants. That same year, the Dodgers began airing regular television broadcasts over WOR-TV, Channel 9 in New York, with the trio of Barber, Desmond, and Scully now alternating play-by-play for the team's games on both radio and TV.

Barber was the first person outside the team's board of directors to be told by Branch Rickey that the Dodgers had begun the process of racial desegregation in baseball, which led to signing Jackie Robinson as the first black player in the major leagues after the 1880s. As a Southerner, having lived with racial segregation as a fact of life written into law, Barber told Rickey that he was not sure he could broadcast the games. As was related in a biography of Branch Rickey by Jimmy Breslin, Barber left the meeting with Rickey and walked for hours trying to decide his future. Having been raised in the racially segregated South, and having attended the University of Florida, which, at the time of his attendance was limited to white male students, he had in his words, "been carefully taught", and the thought of broadcasting games played by a Negro player was simply too much for him to agree to. He arrived home and informed his wife of his decision to quit that very night. She, also being from the Deep South, had become accustomed to a much better life in a toney neighborhood of Westchester County. She convinced him that there was no need to quit then, and a few martinis into the evening, he said he would try. After observing Robinson's skill on the field and the way Robinson held up to the vicious abuse from opposing fans, Barber became an ardent supporter of him and the black players who followed, including Dodger stars Roy Campanella and Don Newcombe. (This story is told in Barber's 1982 book, 1947: When All Hell Broke Loose in Baseball.)

During this period, Barber also broadcast numerous World Series for Mutual radio and in 1948 and 1952 for NBC television, frequently teaming with Yankees announcer Mel Allen. He also called New York Giants football from 1942 to 1946, as well as several professional and college football games on network radio and TV, including the NFL Championship Game, Army–Navy Game and Orange Bowl.

=== New York Yankees ===
Prior to the 1953 World Series, Barber was selected by Gillette, which sponsored the Series broadcasts, to call the games on NBC along with Mel Allen. Barber wanted a larger fee than was offered by Gillette, however, and when Dodgers owner Walter O'Malley refused to back him, Barber declined to work the Series and Vin Scully partnered with Allen on the telecasts instead. As Barber later related in his 1968 autobiography, Rhubarb in the Catbird Seat, he was rankled by O'Malley's lack of support, and this – along with a dispute over the renewal of Barber's $50,000 a year contract – led to his departure from the Dodgers' booth later that October.

Soon afterward the crosstown Yankees hired Barber. Just before the start of the 1954 season, surgery resulted in permanent deafness in one ear. In 1955, he took his long-running television program Red Barber's Corner from CBS to NBC. It ran from 1949 until 1958.

With the Yankees, Barber strove to adopt a strictly neutral, dispassionately reportorial broadcast style, avoiding not only partisanship but also any emotional surges that would match the excitement of the fans. He'd already had a reputation as a "fair" announcer while with the Dodgers, as opposed to a "homer" who openly rooted for his team from the booth. Some fans and critics found this later, more restrained Barber to be dull, especially in contrast with Mel Allen's dramatic, emotive style.

Barber described the ways they covered long fly balls as one of the central differences between Allen and himself. Allen would watch the ball. Thus his signature call, "That ball is going, going, it is GONE!", sometimes turned into, "It is going ... to be caught!" or "It is going ... foul!" Barber would watch the outfielder, his movements and his eyes, and would thus be a better judge whether the ball would be caught. This is evident in his famous call of Gionfriddo's catch (quoted above). Many announcers say "back, back, back" describing the ball's flight. On the Gionfriddo call Barber is describing the action of the outfielder, not the ball.

Curt Smith, in his book Voices of Summer, summarized the difference between Barber and Allen: "Barber was white wine, crepes suzette, and bluegrass music. Allen was hot dogs, beer, and the U.S. Marine Corps Band. Like Millay, Barber was a poet. Like Sinatra, Allen was a balladeer. Detached, Red reported. Involved, Mel roared."

Under the ownership of CBS in 1966, the Yankees finished tenth and last, their first time at the bottom of the standings since 1912 and after more than 40 years of dominating the American League. On September 22, a paid attendance of 413 was announced at the 65,000-seat Yankee Stadium. Barber asked the TV cameras to pan the empty stands as he commented on the low attendance. WPIX refused to do so, on orders from the Yankees' head of media relations. Undeterred, Barber said, "I don't know what the paid attendance is today, but whatever it is, it is the smallest crowd in the history of Yankee Stadium, and this crowd is the story, not the game." In a case of exceptionally bad timing, that game was the first for CBS executive Mike Burke as team president. A week later, Barber was invited to breakfast with Burke, who told him that his contract would not be renewed at the end of the season.

=== Later life ===
After his dismissal by the Yankees in 1966, Barber retired from regular baseball broadcasting. He authored a number of books, including his autobiography, Rhubarb in the Catbird Seat; contributed to occasional sports documentary programs on radio and television, including Ken Burns' documentary Baseball; and from 1981 until his death made weekly contributions to National Public Radio's Morning Edition program. Each Friday Barber, speaking from his home in Tallahassee, Florida, would talk with host Bob Edwards, usually about sports but frequently about other topics, including the flora around his home. Barber would address Edwards as "Colonel Bob", referring to the Kentucky Colonel honorific given to Edwards by his native state.

Red Barber died on October 22, 1992 at Tallahassee Memorial Regional Medical Center in Tallahassee, Florida. Edwards' book Fridays with Red: A Radio Friendship based on his Morning Edition segments with Barber, was published in 1993.

== Honors ==
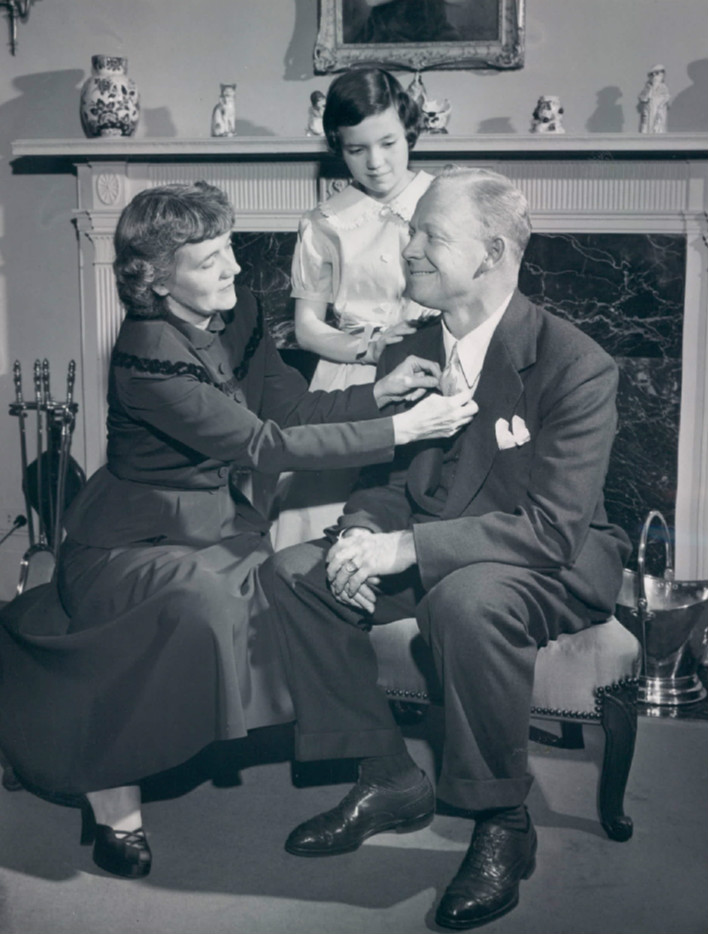
Barber with wife Lylah and daughter Sarah, 1950.

The National Sportscasters and Sportswriters Association inducted Barber into its Hall of Fame in 1973. In 1978, Barber joined former colleague Mel Allen to become the first broadcasters to receive the Ford C. Frick Award from the National Baseball Hall of Fame and Museum. In 1979, he was recognized with a Distinguished Alumni Award from the University of Florida, given a Gold Award by the Florida Association of Broadcasters, and inducted into the Florida Sports Hall of Fame. In 1984, Barber was part of the American Sportscasters Association Hall of Fame's inaugural class which included sportscasting legends Don Dunphy, Ted Husing, Bill Stern and Graham McNamee. Barber was given a George Polk Award in 1985 and a Peabody Award in 1990 for his NPR broadcasts, and in 1995 he was posthumously inducted into the National Radio Hall of Fame.

In 1993, TV Guide named Barber the best sportscaster of the 1950s.

In 1994, two years after his death, Barber was seen several times throughout the Ken Burns series Baseball as he recounted memorable episodes of baseball history, especially of the Brooklyn Dodgers.

The Red Barber Radio Scholarship is awarded each year by the University of Florida's College of Journalism and Communications to a student studying sports broadcasting.

A WRUF microphone used by Barber during the 1930s is part of the National Baseball Hall of Fame and Museum's collection. It has been displayed in the museum's "Scribes and Mikemen" exhibit, and from 2002 to 2006 it was featured as part of the "Baseball as America" traveling exhibition.

== In popular culture ==
Barber is mentioned in "The Catbird Seat", a 1942 short story by James Thurber. A female character in the story likes to use the titular expression as well as such phrases as "tearing up the pea patch" and "hollering down the rain barrel", prompting another character to suggest that she picked them up from listening to Barber's Dodger radio broadcasts. (Ironically enough, according to Barber's daughter, her father did not begin using the "catbird seat" phrase until after he had read the story.)

In 1957, Barber appeared as himself in "Hillbilly Whiz", a third-season episode of The Phil Silvers Show.

In the 2013 film 42, which dramatizes Jackie Robinson breaking the major leagues' color barrier with the Dodgers, Barber is played by John C. McGinley.

In the 2015 television series Manhattan (Series 1, Episode 11), a character asks another if they have "been watching Red Barber" after the latter's foreign accent has improved to sound more American, suggesting that is where she learned to improve it.

== Books by Red Barber ==
- Barber, Red (1954). The Rhubarb Patch: The Story of the Modern Brooklyn Dodgers. New York: Simon & Schuster.
- Barber, Red; Creamer, Robert (1968). Rhubarb in the Catbird Seat. Garden City, NY: Doubleday.
- Barber, Red (1969). Walk in the Spirit: Inspiring Men, Moments and Credos from a Lifetime of Sports Reporting. New York: Dial Press.
- Barber, Red (1970). The Broadcasters. New York: Dial Press. ISBN 0-306-80260-0.
- Barber, Red (1971). Show Me the Way to Go Home. Philadelphia: Westminster John Knox. ISBN 0-664-20901-7.
- Barber, Red (1982). 1947: When All Hell Broke Loose in Baseball. Garden City, NY: Doubleday. ISBN 0-385-17762-3.

== See also ==
- List of University of Florida honorary degree recipients
