= American Sportscasters Association =

The American Sportscasters Association (ASA) was founded in 1979 by broadcaster Dick London (Hanna) and associate attorney Harold Foner as a non-profit association to represent sportscasters by promoting and supporting the needs and interests of the professional sports broadcaster.

== History ==
In 1980, Louis O. Schwartz was asked to revitalize the association by founders Dick London (award-winning broadcast journalist) and (Attorney) Harold Foner and was named executive director. In 1983, a board of directors was established consisting of Jack Brickhouse, Don Dunphy, Dick Enberg, Curt Gowdy and Schwartz. Enberg was elected as chairman and Schwartz as president.

In 1974, Baseball Commissioner Bowie Kuhn's office asked founder, Dick London, to form the Baseball Broadcasters Association of America. This was accomplished with the help of Joe Rickler and Monti Irvin from the Commissioner's Office. A few years later he formed the American Sportscasters Association, the umbrella organization for all sportscasters. After his retirement in 2000, Dick continued to perform on radio and TV. For two years he co-hosted a Sunday pre-game sports show covering all NFL games on KDUS Radio, Phoenix, the voice of the Arizona Cardinals, as well as weekly news and commentary. He also moderated the panel show "Air It Out With The Bad Boys" until the spring of 2008. Since 2008, Dick has been off the mic writing books, including "A Peaceful War," a modern historical novel, and others about his life experiences.

Dick London's career as a print, radio and television broadcast journalist spanned 46 years. In the military, he was the public relations representative for President Eisenhower's Committee for Hungarian Refugee Relief. He received the First Army Award for humanitarian and outstanding service. He was a regular guest on NBC-Monitor, ABC, CBS, BBC and Radio Free Europe. He also produced a military Christmas show with singer Steve Lawrence on WNDT-TV in New York City. After the military, he was the TV News Anchor for a CBS-TV affiliate in Pennsylvania. That was followed by news anchor positions on WWRL/WRFM in New York City, where he became News and Sports Director before WRFM was sold to Bonneville. WWRL was the nation's number one R&B station. Under his leadership, the news team won several civic and national journalism awards including the prestigious Peabody. In 1976, one of the world's top survey organizations, The Lou Harris Company, said Dick's leadership position in New York State made his opinion particularly important to us. Other credits include his nightly half-hour world news round-up on WNYW, the CBS international affiliate, and his news anchor position at WNBC. Dick wrote many articles on social issues for religious organizations, including The National Catholic Register, The American Baptist Educational Ministries and the National Council of Churches. Dick has post Graduate Degrees in Broadcast Journalism and Media from CUNY, and NYU (Gallatin Division).

== Halls of fame ==
In 1984, Schwartz established the ASA Hall of Fame to honor those who have achieved excellence in the field of sports broadcasting. Inductees include:

- 1984 – Red Barber
- 1984 – Don Dunphy
- 1985 – Curt Gowdy
- 1984 – Ted Husing
- 1984 – Graham McNamee
- 1984 – Bill Stern
- 1985 – Mel Allen
- 1985 – Jack Brickhouse
- 1986 – Lindsey Nelson
- 1987 – Clem McCarthy
- 1987 – Jim McKay
- 1989 – Harry Caray
- 1990 – Jack Buck
- 1991 – Ernie Harwell
- 1992 – Vin Scully
- 1993 – Howard Cosell
- 1993 – Marty Glickman
- 1994 – Keith Jackson
- 1995 – Chick Hearn
- 1996 – Chris Schenkel
- 1997 – Pat Summerall
- 1997 – Jack Whitaker
- 1998 – Ray Scott

In 1987, the association established an International Hall of Fame. Its first inductee was Masao Hazama, one of Japan's first television sports broadcasters. Other inductees include BBC Sport boxing correspondent Harry Carpenter (1989) and Song Shixiong, sports commentator for China Central Television (CCTV) for over 30 years (1995).

== Recognizing sportcasters and notable individuals ==
A "Sportscaster of the Year" award has also been given to top sportscasters, including Marv Albert, Chris Berman, Bob Costas, John Madden and Al Michaels.

The association has also recognized sports greats and other notable individuals who have influenced society and the world of sports, including Muhammad Ali, Arthur Ashe, Joe DiMaggio, Larry King, Henry Kissinger, LeRoy Neiman, and U.S. President Ronald Reagan

== Events ==
It has had fourteen Hall of Fame dinners with over 500 attendees at each one.

== Board of directors ==
As of 2016, its board of directors included Enberg, Jon Miller, Jim Nantz, Schwartz and Bill Walton.

== See also ==
- National Sports Media Association
