= Bill Wendell =

American television announcer (1924–1999)

- Bill Wendell's last appearance on the Late Show with David Letterman (August 18, 1995).
- Born: William Joseph Wenzel Jr. March 22, 1924; New York City, U.S.
- Died: April 14, 1999 (aged 75); Boca Raton, Florida, U.S.
- Occupation: Announcer
- Years active: 1947–1995

William Joseph Wenzel Jr. (March 22, 1924 – April 14, 1999), known as Bill Wendell, was an NBC television staff announcer for almost his entire professional career.

== Life and career ==
Born William Joseph Wenzel Jr. on March 22, 1924, in New York City, Wendell served in the United States Army Air Corps during World War II and graduated from Fordham University with a degree in speech. He began his radio career in summer of 1947 at WHAM in Rochester, New York. He moved to WWJ in Detroit, where he worked in both radio and TV. Wendell returned to Manhattan in 1952 when he landed a job on the DuMont Television Network emceeing several shows before jumping to NBC in 1955.

He was a regular on The Ernie Kovacs Show and on Kovacs's version of the Tonight Show which aired Monday and Tuesday nights from 1956 to 1957 with Wendell serving as the show's announcer, as well as a participant in sketches such as "Mr. Question Man" (a parody of The Answer Man). He also worked with Steve Allen, Jack Paar, Dave Garroway, and other NBC personalities. After Jack Barry was implicated in the quiz show scandals, Wendell succeeded him as emcee of Tic Tac Dough on October 13, 1958, until the show was finally canceled in October 1959. By December, Wendell had resumed his staff announcing position at NBC. His colleagues were Don Pardo, Wayne Howell, Gene Hamilton, Ben Grauer, Fred Facey, Bill McCord, Roger Tuttle, and Howard Reig.

Wendell served as an announcer on NBC's Tomorrow with Tom Snyder during the 1970s.

He was David Letterman's announcer, beginning partway through the short-lived morning program The David Letterman Show in 1980. He continued with Letterman as the regular announcer for NBC's Late Night with David Letterman from 1982 to 1993, the entirety of the show's NBC run. In addition to his duties as announcer, Wendell occasionally participated in sketches, usually playing himself. He moved with Letterman to CBS in 1993, staying as announcer on the Late Show with David Letterman.

Wendell retired in mid-1995, with his last episode airing on August 18. Following a two-week hiatus, Alan Kalter succeeded him as announcer on September 4. Kalter had previously replaced Wendell as announcer for the final season of To Tell the Truth in 1977–78. Before he announced for David Letterman's Late Night, Wendell was announcer on Tom Snyder's Tomorrow Show when Snyder moved production from Burbank, California to New York. Snyder's time slot was later given to Letterman, who kept Wendell as announcer.

According to Robert Morton, producer of The Late Show, Bill "had a little flatulence problem" and would often fart openly in front of the production crew and audience.

It was reported at the time that Wendell's departure from The Late Show was on less-than friendly terms, with Letterman refusing comment, and Wendell pointedly saying "I’m retiring from this show", as well indicating that he hadn't talked to Letterman himself in months and that the producers "haven’t said a thing to me, either." Regarding a counteroffer he had received from NBC at the time he moved to CBS along with Letterman, Wendell said, "There were friends I had at NBC, they’re still there. I felt very badly that I didn’t go with them, and stay at NBC.”

On the June 14, 2018, episode of The Carson Podcast, Morton claimed that "I fired Wendell because he was stealing water [bottled water intended for the staff]. One day I see Wendell walking out with a case of water. When we caught him doing it a second time, we all said, 'We can't tolerate this.' He was a wonderful announcer and a good guy, but he was petty."

Wendell continued to work after his retirement from Letterman's show; his last major job was as the original voiceover announcer in Old Navy's "fashion show" commercial campaign.

Wendell also appeared as a TV announcer in the movie Mr. Saturday Night, which starred Billy Crystal.

== Death ==
Wendell died of complications from cancer on April 14, 1999, in Boca Raton, Florida.

Media offices
Preceded by none	The Late Show announcer August 30, 1993 – August 18, 1995	Succeeded by Alan Kalter

== Obituaries ==
- Obituary in The New York Times, April 15, 1999.
- Obituary in Variety, May 25, 1999.
