= Mel Brandt =

American actor (1919–2008)

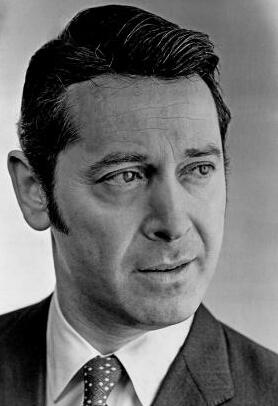
- Born: June 18, 1919; Brooklyn, New York City, U.S.
- Died: March 14, 2008 (aged 88); Florida, U.S.
- Occupations: Actor; announcer
- Years active: 1946–2008
- Political party: Republican
- Military career
- Allegiance: United States
- Branch: United States Army
- Rank: Private
- Conflicts: World War II

Melville Brandt (June 18, 1919 – March 14, 2008) was an actor and NBC staff announcer.

== Early life ==
Mel Brandt was born in Brooklyn, New York in 1919. He attended Brooklyn College majoring in speech, and Columbia University majoring in business administration. While in college, Brandt worked for WNYC-FM. After leaving college, he worked for WOR. On February 17, 1941, Brandt enlisted in the United States Army in New York City. His official army records say he served in the Medical Department, but a 1958 newspaper profile said he served with the Office of War Information for Voice of America from Reykjavik, Iceland, and later with the Third Infantry Division.

After returning from the war, Brandt worked as a freelance announcer for each of the major networks at the time. In September 1945 Brandt auditioned for NBC radio’s Welcome Home, a program started in 1944 as a way to help World War II veterans obtain work in radio. Encouraged by his "A plus" audition rating he auditioned for numerous radio series, and was hired to work in a commercial on a daytime radio serial on another network.

== Announcing and acting career ==
Brandt joined NBC around 1948. His radio announcing credits included The Adventures of Frank Merriwell, Author Meets the Critics, and The Eternal Light. In 1975, he announced for a syndicated radio program called Faces of Love.

He was one of the stars of the first television soap opera, Faraway Hill, broadcast in 1946 on the DuMont Television Network. He announced the opening of the television soap opera, The Doctors. His introduction was "The Doctors: The Emmy Award winning program, dedicated to the brotherhood of healing."

Brandt was the series announcer for other NBC-TV programs including The Bell Telephone Hour from 1959 through 1968, and GE College Bowl on NBC from 1963–70, in which his introduction was "Match wits with the champions in America's favorite question and answer game, live from New York, the General Electric College Bowl,", and after a brief plug for General Electric would introduce "the man with the questions, Robert Earle."

From 1962 to 1975 Brandt was the NBC announcer who stated "The following program is brought to you in living color on NBC" when the second animated version of the NBC Peacock played at the start of certain shows.

Brandt replaced Don Pardo as the announcer on Saturday Night Live during the 1981-82 season – except for two episodes from that season in which Brandt was replaced by Bill Hanrahan, better known then as the voice of NBC Nightly News.

== AFTRA president ==
Mel Brandt was elected president of the American Federation of Television and Radio Artists (AFTRA) on July 15, 1967. He had previously served as president of the New York chapter of the organization and as the organization's vice president. He was especially interested in the international aspects of performers' rights, and in 1972 he received the George Heller Memorial Gold Card (a gold-plated membership card) for his efforts to improve union and members' rights. That was AFTRA's highest honor. Brandt served from 1967 to 1970.

== Personal life ==
Near the end of his term as AFTRA president, Brandt considered running for political office. A 1970 newspaper article described him as a liberal Republican, and said he supported New Jersey Governor William T. Cahill and New York City mayor John Lindsay.

For many years, Brandt lived in Montclair, New Jersey. He had a wife, Doris, and three children. He later moved to Florida, and is buried at the Florida National Cemetery.
