= Howard Reig =

American radio and television personality (1921–2008)

Howard Reig (May 31, 1921 – November 10, 2008) was an American radio and television announcer. His last name was pronounced "reeg."

== Personal life ==
Reig was born on May 31, 1921, in New York City. He was a staff announcer for General Electric's Schenectady, New York, stations WGY (AM), WGFM (now WRVE) and WRGB starting in 1943, and the National Broadcasting Company (NBC) from 1952 to 2005. He is most well known for being the voice of NBC Nightly News. Until the late 1970s, he also handled announcing duties for the local newscasts of the network's New York City flagship station, WNBC-TV.

Although he retired from NBC on March 25, 2005, he was still heard on Nightly News until December 14, 2007, when anchor Brian Williams announced a new voice "that you all know" will debut as the new announcer beginning December 17, 2007. The new voice was that of actor Michael Douglas.

He earned a B.A. and M.F.A. from SUNY Albany.

== Death ==
Howard Reig died on November 10, 2008, aged 87, in Venice, Florida.

Preceded by Bill Hanrahan	Announcer on NBC Nightly News; 1983 – December 14, 2007	Succeeded by Michael Douglas
