= Don Pardo =

American announcer (1918–2014)

- Pardo announcing Saturday Night Live in 1992
- Born: Dominick George Pardo Jr. February 22, 1918; Westfield, Massachusetts, U.S.
- Died: August 18, 2014 (aged 96); Tucson, Arizona, U.S.
- Other name: Dom Pardo
- Education: Emerson College
- Occupations: Voice actor, announcer
- Years active: 1938–2014
- Known for: Announcer for Saturday Night Live
- Spouse: Catherine Lyons (m. 1938; died 1995)
- Children: 5
- Awards: Television Hall of Fame (member since 2010)

Signature
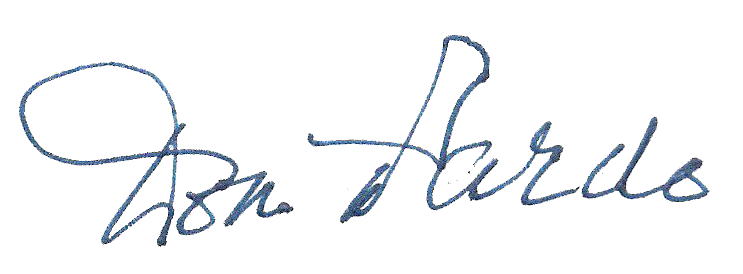

Dominick George "Don" Pardo Jr. (February 22, 1918 – August 18, 2014) was an American radio and television announcer whose career spanned more than seven decades.

A member of the Television Hall of Fame, Pardo was noted for his 70-year tenure with NBC, working as the announcer for early incarnations of such notable shows as The Price Is Right, Jackpot, Jeopardy!, Three on a Match, Winning Streak and NBC Nightly News. His longest and best-known announcing job was for NBC's Saturday Night Live, a job he held for 38 seasons. His tenure stretched from the show's debut in 1975 until the end of the 6th season in 1981, and again from the season 8 premiere in 1982 until his death in 2014.

== Early and personal life ==
Pardo was born in Westfield, Massachusetts, to Dominick George Pardo Sr. and Valeria "Viola" Rominak-Pardo, who were Polish immigrants who owned a bakery. He spent his childhood in Norwich, Connecticut, and Providence, Rhode Island, and graduated from Emerson College in 1942. Pardo was married to Catherine Lyons from 1938 until her death in 1995 and had five children: Donna, Karen, Paula, David and Michael.

== Career ==
=== Radio ===
Pardo was hired for his first radio position at NBC affiliate WJAR in Providence in 1938.

He joined NBC full-time as an in-house announcer in 1944, remaining on the network staff for 60 years. The radio programs on which he worked as an announcer include Barrie Craig, Confidential Investigator, the sci-fi shows X Minus One and Dimension X.

During World War II, Pardo worked as a war reporter for NBC Radio.

For most of 30 years, Pardo's recorded voice was one of the announcer introduction inserts for "Ten at Ten", the KFOG San Francisco radio show appearing at 10 a.m., and in syndication with Dave Morey on KFOG HD Radio, although a few years featured Monty Hall and Larry "Bud" Melman.

=== Television ===
In the early 1950s, he served as announcer for many of RCA's and NBC's closed-circuit color television demonstrations.

Pardo made his mark on game shows for NBC in 1952 as the announcer on Winner Take All, and as the voice of the original The Price Is Right from 1956 until it moved to ABC in 1963. Pardo's next show was Jeopardy!, which he announced from 1964 until the original version of the series ended in 1975. Pardo also announced New York-based NBC game shows such as Three on a Match, Winning Streak, and Jackpot!, all three of which were Bob Stewart productions.

Pardo squeezed in many other assignments at NBC, including the Macy's Thanksgiving Day Parade (until 1999), WNBC-TV's Live at Five and NBC Nightly News.

Pardo was the on-duty live booth announcer for WNBC-TV in New York and the NBC network on November 22, 1963, and he was the first to announce to NBC viewers that President John F. Kennedy had been shot in Dallas, Texas.

His best-known announcing work was for the television series Saturday Night Live. His was the fourth voice heard on the show's premiere episode in 1975, after the first cold open sketch featuring Michael O'Donoghue, John Belushi and Chevy Chase. Pardo remained the program's announcer except for one season (1981–1982), when it was announced by Mel Brandt or Bill Hanrahan. After "Live from New York, it's Saturday Night!", which is cried out at the end of the cold open, Pardo announces the show's title, then names the cast members and musical guests in a voice-over during the opening montage. According to Pardo, his Saturday Night Live announcing booth during his tenure at Studio 8H was almost exactly where Arturo Toscanini stood when conducting the NBC Symphony Orchestra in Rockefeller Center from 1937 to 1950.

In December 1976, Pardo participated in a musical performance by Frank Zappa, reciting a verse of the song "I'm the Slime". Pardo reprised this role on the live-recorded version of the song for the Zappa in New York album (it was not featured on the first release in 1978, but it appears on the 1991 CD re-release). He also provided narration for the songs "The Illinois Enema Bandit" and "Punky's Whips". A business dispute between Zappa and his record company of the time led to "Punky's Whips" being removed from the 1978 album, but the song was reinstated on the 1991 CD.

Pardo appeared in the "Weird Al" Yankovic song "I Lost on Jeopardy", from his second album, "Weird Al" Yankovic in 3-D, a parody of "Jeopardy" by The Greg Kihn Band, and its refrain "Our love's in jeopardy." The song became the fourth music video released by Yankovic, and featured a number of cameo appearances including Kihn, original Jeopardy! host Art Fleming, Yankovic's mentor Dr. Demento, Pardo, and Yankovic's parents.

In 2009, he appeared in an episode of 30 Rock ("Cutbacks") as Sid, TGS's announcer.

=== Video games ===
Pardo was a voice actor in the video game Wacky Jacks.

== Last years ==
Pardo nominally retired from NBC in 2004. However, he continued to announce for Saturday Night Live at the behest of executive producer Lorne Michaels, initially under the assumption that a permanent replacement would be found quickly. After relocating to Tucson, Arizona in 2005, he began pre-recording his announcements from his home studio one year later. That arrangement lasted only a few episodes before producers insisted that they needed him in Studio 8H, and he resumed weekly flights to New York. On Saturday, February 23, 2008, Pardo appeared at the closing of Saturday Night Live to blow out the candles on his 90th birthday cake. During this period, Pardo missed about five episodes due to illness; cast member Darrell Hammond (who would succeed Pardo after his death) filled in for him but was uncredited.

Upon his induction into the Rhode Island Radio Hall of Fame on May 14, 2009, Pardo suggested that the May 16, 2009, episode of Saturday Night Live would be his last. However, he subsequently returned for the show's 35th season. Starting with the 36th season, Pardo once again began pre-recording his parts from his home in Arizona instead of performing live in New York City.

In 2010, Pardo was inducted into the Television Hall of Fame.

Pardo died in his sleep in his Tucson home on August 18, 2014 at the age of 96.
