= List of awards and nominations received by Severance =

Severance awards and nominations
Awards and nominations
Award	Wins	Nominations
AACTA International Awards	0	1
American Film Institute Awards	1	1
Art Directors Guild Awards	1	1
Artios Awards	0	1
Astra Awards	1	13
Cinema Audio Society Awards	0	1
Critics' Choice Super Awards	3	6
Critics' Choice Television Awards	1	6
Directors Guild of America Awards	0	2
Dorian Awards	2	8
Golden Globe Awards	0	3
Golden Reel Awards	0	2
Golden Trailer Awards	5	6
Gotham Independent Film Awards	0	2
Hollywood Critics Association TV Awards	5	12
Hollywood Music in Media Awards	0	1
Hugo Awards	0	1
Irish Film & Television Awards	0	1
Independent Spirit Awards	0	3
Peabody Awards	1	1
People's Choice Awards	0	1
Primetime Emmy Awards	2	17
Primetime Creative Arts Emmy Awards	8	24
Producers Guild of America Awards	0	1
Satellite Awards	0	6
Saturn Awards	0	9
Screen Actors Guild Awards	0	2
Seoul International Drama Awards	2	4
Set Decorators Society of America Awards	1	2
Society of Composers & Lyricists Awards	0	1
Television Critics Association Awards	0	9
Venice TV Awards	0	1
Visual Effects Society Awards	0	2
Webby Awards	1	1
Writers Guild of America Awards	2	3

Totals (Note: Certain award groups do not simply award one winner. They acknowledge several different recipients, have runners-up, and have third place. Since this is a specific recognition and is different from losing an award, runner-up mentions are considered wins in this award tally. For simplification and to avoid errors, each award in this list has been presumed to have had a prior nomination.)
- Wins: 35
- Nominations: 151

Severance is an American science fiction psychological thriller television series created by Dan Erickson and executive produced by Ben Stiller for Apple TV+. The series follows employees of the fictional biotech corporation Lumon Industries – which uses a "severance" program in which their work and personal memories are separated – and stars an ensemble cast including Adam Scott, Zach Cherry, Britt Lower, Tramell Tillman, Jen Tullock, Dichen Lachman, Michael Chernus, John Turturro, Christopher Walken, and Patricia Arquette. The first season premiered on February 18, 2022, running for nine episodes, with a following season of ten episodes debuting on January 16, 2025.

Both seasons have received critical acclaim, (Note: Season-by-season critical response: Season 1 holds a 97% approval rating based on 117 reviews on Rotten Tomatoes and a score of 83 based on 36 reviews on Metacritic, indicating "universal acclaim".; Season 2 holds a 94% approval rating based on 225 reviews on Rotten Tomatoes and a score of 87 based on 45 reviews on Metacritic, also indicating "universal acclaim".) with particular focus on the cinematography, setting, soundtrack, direction, and performances. Severance has been the recipient of numerous accolades; between the 74th and 77th Primetime Emmy Awards the show received 41 nominations and 10 wins – including Outstanding Supporting Actor in a Drama Series for Tillman as Seth Milchick and Outstanding Lead Actress in a Drama Series for Lower's performance as Helly R.. Severance also won consecutive submissions for Outstanding Music Composition for a Series and Outstanding Main Title Design. Scott's performance as Mark Scout earned him two nominations for the Primetime Emmy Award for Outstanding Lead Actor in a Drama Series, two Television Critics Association Award nominations, and one Golden Globe Award nomination.

== Awards and nominations ==
Accolades received by Severance
Award	Year	Category	Recipient(s)	Result	Ref.
AACTA International Awards	2023	Best Drama Series	Severance	Nominated	
American Film Institute Awards	2022	Top 10 Programs of the Year	Severance	Won	
American Film Institute Awards	2025	Top 10 Programs of the Year	Severance	Won	
Art Directors Guild Awards	2023	Excellence in Production Design for a One-Hour Contemporary Single-Camera Series	Jeremy Hindle (for "Good News About Hell")	Won	
Artios Awards	2023	Outstanding Achievement in Casting – Television Pilot and First Season Drama Series	Rachel Tenner, Bess Fifer, and Rick Messina	Nominated	
Astra Awards	2025	Best Drama Series	Severance	Won	
Astra Awards	2025	Best Actor in a Drama Series	Adam Scott	Nominated	
Astra Awards	2025	Best Actress in a Drama Series	Britt Lower	Nominated	
Astra Awards	2025	Best Supporting Actor in a Drama Series	Tramell Tillman	Nominated	
Astra Awards	2025	Best Supporting Actor in a Drama Series	John Turturro	Nominated	
Astra Awards	2025	Best Supporting Actress in a Drama Series	Dichen Lachman	Nominated	
Astra Awards	2025	Best Guest Actor in a Drama Series	John Noble	Nominated	
Astra Awards	2025	Best Guest Actress in a Drama Series	Gwendoline Christie	Nominated	
Astra Awards	2025	Best Guest Actress in a Drama Series	Merritt Wever	Nominated	
Astra Awards	2025	Best Cast Ensemble in a Streaming Drama Series	Severance	Nominated	
Astra Awards	2025	Best Directing in a Drama Series	Jessica Lee Gagné (for "Chikhai Bardo")	Nominated	
Astra Awards	2025	Best Directing in a Drama Series	Ben Stiller (for "Cold Harbor")	Nominated	
Astra Awards	2025	Best Writing in a Drama Series	Dan Erickson (for "Cold Harbor")	Nominated	
British Academy Television Craft Awards	2026	Best Photography and Lighting: Fiction	Suzie Lavelle	Nominated	
British Academy Television Craft Awards	2026	Best Director: Fiction	Sam Donovan	Nominated	
British Academy Television Awards	2026	Best International Programme	Severance	Nominated	
Cinema Audio Society Awards	2023	Outstanding Achievement in Sound Mixing for Television Series – One Hour	Bryan Dembinski, Bob Chefalas, Chris Fogel, and George A. Lara (for "The We We Are")	Nominated	
Critics' Choice Super Awards	2023	Best Actor in a Science Fiction/Fantasy Series, Limited Series or Made-for-TV Movie	Adam Scott	Won	
Critics' Choice Super Awards	2023	Best Actress in a Science Fiction/Fantasy Series, Limited Series or Made-for-TV Movie	Patricia Arquette	Won	
Critics' Choice Super Awards	2025	Best Science Fiction/Fantasy Series, Limited Series or Made-for-TV Movie	Severance	Nominated	
Critics' Choice Super Awards	2025	Best Actor in a Science Fiction/Fantasy Series, Limited Series or Made-for-TV Movie	Adam Scott	Nominated	
Critics' Choice Super Awards	2025	Best Actor in a Science Fiction/Fantasy Series, Limited Series or Made-for-TV Movie	Tramell Tillman	Nominated	
Critics' Choice Super Awards	2025	Best Actress in a Science Fiction/Fantasy Series, Limited Series or Made-for-TV Movie	Britt Lower	Won	
Critics' Choice Television Awards	2023	Best Drama Series	Severance	Nominated	
Critics' Choice Television Awards	2023	Best Actor in a Drama Series	Adam Scott	Nominated	
Critics' Choice Television Awards	2026	Best Drama Series	Severance	Nominated	
Critics' Choice Television Awards	2026	Best Actor in a Drama Series	Adam Scott	Nominated	
Critics' Choice Television Awards	2026	Best Actress in a Drama Series	Britt Lower	Nominated	
Critics' Choice Television Awards	2026	Best Supporting Actor in a Drama Series	Tramell Tillman	Won	
Directors Guild of America Awards	2023	Outstanding Directorial Achievement in Dramatic Series	Aoife McArdle (for "Hide and Seek")	Nominated	
Directors Guild of America Awards	2023	Outstanding Directorial Achievement in Dramatic Series	Ben Stiller (for "The We We Are")	Nominated	
Dorian Awards	2022	Best TV Drama	Severance	Nominated	
Dorian Awards	2022	Most Visually Striking Show	Severance	Nominated	
Dorian Awards	2025	Best TV Drama	Severance	Nominated	
Dorian Awards	2025	Best Written TV Show	Severance	Nominated	
Dorian Awards	2025	Best TV Performance — Drama	Adam Scott	Nominated	
Dorian Awards	2025	Best Supporting TV Performance — Drama	Tramell Tillman	Won	
Dorian Awards	2025	Best Genre TV Show	Severance	Nominated	
Dorian Awards	2025	Most Visually Striking TV Show	Severance	Won	
Golden Globe Awards	2023	Best Television Series – Drama	Severance	Nominated	
Golden Globe Awards	2023	Best Actor in a Television Series – Drama	Adam Scott	Nominated	
Golden Globe Awards	2023	Best Supporting Actor in a Television Series – Comedy/Musical or Drama	John Turturro	Nominated	
Golden Globe Awards	2026	Best Television Series – Drama	Severance	Nominated	
Golden Globe Awards	2026	Best Actor in a Television Series – Drama	Adam Scott	Nominated	
Golden Globe Awards	2026	Best Actress in a Television Series – Drama	Britt Lower	Nominated	
Golden Globe Awards	2026	Best Supporting Actor on Television	Tramell Tillman	Nominated	
Golden Reel Awards	2023	Outstanding Achievement in Sound Editing – Broadcast Long Form Dialogue and ADR	Jacob Ribicoff, David Briggs, and Gregg Swiatlowski (for "The We We Are")	Nominated	
Golden Reel Awards	2023	Outstanding Achievement in Music Editing – Broadcast Long Form	Missy Cohen, Sam Zeines, and Felipe Pacheco (for "The We We Are")	Nominated	
Golden Trailer Awards	2025	Best Drama (Trailer/Teaser) for a TV/Streaming Series	Apple TV+ / Transit (for "Season 2 RTO Teaser")	Won	
Golden Trailer Awards	2025	Best Music (Trailer/Teaser) for a TV/Streaming Series	Apple TV+ / Transit (for "Season 2 RTO Teaser")	Won	
Golden Trailer Awards	2025	Most Original (Trailer/Teaser) for a TV/Streaming Series	Apple TV+ / Transit (for "Season 2 RTO Teaser")	Won	
Golden Trailer Awards	2025	Best Horror/Thriller (Trailer/Teaser) for a TV/Streaming Series	Apple TV+ / Wild Card Creative Group (for "Welcome Back")	Won	
Golden Trailer Awards	2025	Best Horror/Thriller (TV Spot) for a TV/Streaming Series	Apple TV+ / Wild Card Creative Group (for "Return")	Nominated	
Golden Trailer Awards	2025	Best Digital – Horror/Thriller	Apple TV+ / Leroy & Rose (for "Season 2 Digital Campaign")	Won	
Gotham Independent Film Awards	2022	Breakthrough Series – Long Form	Severance	Nominated	
Gotham Independent Film Awards	2022	Outstanding Performance in a New Series	Britt Lower	Nominated	
Hollywood Critics Association TV Awards	2022	Best Streaming Series, Drama	Severance	Won	
Hollywood Critics Association TV Awards	2022	Best Actor in a Streaming Series, Drama	Adam Scott	Nominated	
Hollywood Critics Association TV Awards	2022	Best Actress in a Streaming Series, Drama	Britt Lower	Won (Note: Tied with Laura Linney for Ozark.)	
Hollywood Critics Association TV Awards	2022	Best Supporting Actor in a Streaming Series, Drama	Zach Cherry	Nominated	
Hollywood Critics Association TV Awards	2022	Best Supporting Actor in a Streaming Series, Drama	Tramell Tillman	Nominated	
Hollywood Critics Association TV Awards	2022	Best Supporting Actor in a Streaming Series, Drama	John Turturro	Won	
Hollywood Critics Association TV Awards	2022	Best Supporting Actor in a Streaming Series, Drama	Christopher Walken	Nominated	
Hollywood Critics Association TV Awards	2022	Best Supporting Actress in a Streaming Series, Drama	Patricia Arquette	Nominated	
Hollywood Critics Association TV Awards	2022	Best Supporting Actress in a Streaming Series, Drama	Dichen Lachman	Nominated	
Hollywood Critics Association TV Awards	2022	Best Directing in a Streaming Series, Drama	Aoife McArdle (for "The You You Are")	Nominated	
Hollywood Critics Association TV Awards	2022	Best Directing in a Streaming Series, Drama	Ben Stiller (for "The We We Are")	Won	
Hollywood Critics Association TV Awards	2022	Best Writing in a Streaming Series, Drama	Dan Erickson (for "The We We Are")	Won	
Hollywood Music in Media Awards	2022	Original Score – TV Show/Limited Series	Theodore Shapiro	Nominated	
Hollywood Music in Media Awards	2025	Original Score – TV Show/Limited Series	Theodore Shapiro	Won	
Hollywood Music in Media Awards	2025	Music Supervision – Television	George Drakoulias	Nominated	
Hugo Awards	2023	Best Dramatic Presentation, Long Form	Dan Erickson, Ben Stiller, Aoife McArdle, and writing staff	Nominated	
Independent Spirit Awards	2023	Best New Scripted Series	Severance	Nominated	
Independent Spirit Awards	2023	Best Lead Performance in a New Scripted Series	Adam Scott	Nominated	
Independent Spirit Awards	2023	Best Supporting Performance in a New Scripted Series	Tramell Tillman	Nominated	
Irish Film & Television Awards	2023	Director – Television Drama	Aoife McArdle	Nominated	
Peabody Awards	2022	Entertainment	Severance	Won	
People's Choice Awards	2022	The Bingeworthy Show of 2022	Severance	Nominated	
Primetime Emmy Awards	2022	Outstanding Drama Series	Ben Stiller, Nicholas Weinstock, Jackie Cohn, Mark Friedman, Dan Erickson, Andrew Colville, Chris Black, John Cameron, Jill Footlick, Kari Drake, Adam Scott, Patricia Arquette, Aoife McArdle, Amanda Overton, and Gerry Robert Bryne	Nominated	
Primetime Emmy Awards	2022	Outstanding Lead Actor in a Drama Series	Adam Scott (for "Good News About Hell")	Nominated	
Primetime Emmy Awards	2022	Outstanding Supporting Actor in a Drama Series	John Turturro (for "Defiant Jazz")	Nominated	
Primetime Emmy Awards	2022	Outstanding Supporting Actor in a Drama Series	Christopher Walken (for "The Grim Barbarity of Optics and Design")	Nominated	
Primetime Emmy Awards	2022	Outstanding Supporting Actress in a Drama Series	Patricia Arquette (for "What's for Dinner?")	Nominated	
Primetime Emmy Awards	2022	Outstanding Directing for a Drama Series	Ben Stiller (for "The We We Are")	Nominated	
Primetime Emmy Awards	2022	Outstanding Writing for a Drama Series	Dan Erickson (for "The We We Are")	Nominated	
Primetime Emmy Awards	2025	Outstanding Drama Series	Ben Stiller, Jackie Cohn, John Lesher, Richard Schwartz, Nicholas Weinstock, Mark Friedman, Dan Erickson, Beau Willimon, Jordan Tappis, Sam Donovan, Caroline Baron, Adam Scott, Patricia Arquette, Mohamad El Masri, Adam Countee, Anna Ouyang Moench, Jessica Lee Gagné, Wei-Ning Yu, Sean Fogel, Erin Wagoner, and K.C. Perry	Nominated	
Primetime Emmy Awards	2025	Outstanding Lead Actor in a Drama Series	Adam Scott (for "Cold Harbor")	Nominated	
Primetime Emmy Awards	2025	Outstanding Lead Actress in a Drama Series	Britt Lower (for "Attila")	Won	
Primetime Emmy Awards	2025	Outstanding Supporting Actor in a Drama Series	Zach Cherry (for "The After Hours")	Nominated	
Primetime Emmy Awards	2025	Outstanding Supporting Actor in a Drama Series	Tramell Tillman (for "The After Hours")	Won	
Primetime Emmy Awards	2025	Outstanding Supporting Actor in a Drama Series	John Turturro (for "Woe's Hollow")	Nominated	
Primetime Emmy Awards	2025	Outstanding Supporting Actress in a Drama Series	Patricia Arquette (for "Sweet Vitriol")	Nominated	
Primetime Emmy Awards	2025	Outstanding Directing for a Drama Series	Jessica Lee Gagné (for "Chikhai Bardo")	Nominated	
Primetime Emmy Awards	2025	Outstanding Directing for a Drama Series	Ben Stiller (for "Cold Harbor")	Nominated	
Primetime Emmy Awards	2025	Outstanding Writing for a Drama Series	Dan Erickson (for "Cold Harbor")	Nominated	
Primetime Creative Arts Emmy Awards	2022	Outstanding Casting for a Drama Series	Rachel Tenner and Bess Fifer	Nominated	
Primetime Creative Arts Emmy Awards	2022	Outstanding Main Title Design	Oliver Latta and Teddy Blanks	Won	
Primetime Creative Arts Emmy Awards	2022	Outstanding Music Composition for a Series (Original Dramatic Score)	Theodore Shapiro (for "The We We Are")	Won	
Primetime Creative Arts Emmy Awards	2022	Outstanding Original Main Title Theme Music	Theodore Shapiro	Nominated	
Primetime Creative Arts Emmy Awards	2022	Outstanding Production Design for a Narrative Contemporary Program (One Hour or More)	Jeremy Hindle, Nick Francone, Angelica Borrero-Fortier, and Andrew Baseman (for "Good News About Hell")	Nominated	
Primetime Creative Arts Emmy Awards	2022	Outstanding Single-Camera Picture Editing for a Drama Series	Erica Freed Marker and Geoffrey Richman (for "In Perpetuity")	Nominated	
Primetime Creative Arts Emmy Awards	2022	Outstanding Single-Camera Picture Editing for a Drama Series	Geoffrey Richman (for "The We We Are")	Nominated	
Primetime Creative Arts Emmy Awards	2025	Outstanding Guest Actress in a Drama Series	Jane Alexander (for "Sweet Vitriol")	Nominated	
Primetime Creative Arts Emmy Awards	2025	Outstanding Guest Actress in a Drama Series	Gwendoline Christie (for "Cold Harbor")	Nominated	
Primetime Creative Arts Emmy Awards	2025	Outstanding Guest Actress in a Drama Series	Merritt Wever (for "Who Is Alive?")	Won	
Primetime Creative Arts Emmy Awards	2025	Outstanding Casting for a Drama Series	Rachel Tenner and Bess Fifer	Nominated	
Primetime Creative Arts Emmy Awards	2025	Outstanding Choreography for Scripted Programming	Andrew Turteltaub (for "Choreography & Merriment" / "The Battle of Ambrose and Gunnel")	Nominated	
Primetime Creative Arts Emmy Awards	2025	Outstanding Cinematography for a Series (One Hour)	Jessica Lee Gagné (for "Hello, Ms. Cobel")	Won	
Primetime Creative Arts Emmy Awards	2025	Outstanding Title Design	Oliver Latta and Teddy Blanks	Won	
Primetime Creative Arts Emmy Awards	2025	Outstanding Music Composition for a Series (Original Dramatic Score)	Theodore Shapiro (for "Cold Harbor")	Won	
Primetime Creative Arts Emmy Awards	2025	Outstanding Music Supervision	George Drakoulias (for "Cold Harbor")	Nominated	
Primetime Creative Arts Emmy Awards	2025	Outstanding Picture Editing for a Drama Series	Keith Fraase (for "Chikhai Bardo")	Nominated	
Primetime Creative Arts Emmy Awards	2025	Outstanding Picture Editing for a Drama Series	Joseph Landauer (for "Attila")	Nominated	
Primetime Creative Arts Emmy Awards	2025	Outstanding Picture Editing for a Drama Series	Geoffrey Richman (for "Cold Harbor")	Nominated	
Primetime Creative Arts Emmy Awards	2025	Outstanding Production Design for a Narrative Contemporary Program (One Hour or More)	Jeremy Hindle, Chris Shriver, Ann Bartek, and David Schlesinger (for "Chikhai Bardo")	Won	
Primetime Creative Arts Emmy Awards	2025	Outstanding Sound Editing for a Comedy or Drama Series (One Hour)	Jacob Ribicoff, Gregg Swiatlowski, Eric Strausser, Sam Zeines, Felipe Pacheco, Marko Costanzo, and Alex Wang (for "Chikhai Bardo")	Nominated	
Primetime Creative Arts Emmy Awards	2025	Outstanding Sound Mixing for a Comedy or Drama Series (One Hour)	Bob Chefalas, Jacob Ribicoff, David Schwartz, and George Lara (for "Cold Harbor")	Won	
Primetime Creative Arts Emmy Awards	2025	Outstanding Special Visual Effects in a Single Episode	Eric Leven, Sean Findley, Shawn Hillier, Radost Ridlen, Martin Kolejak, Brian Holligan, Alex Lemke, Michael Huber, and Djuna Wahlrab (for "Hello, Ms. Cobel")	Nominated	
Primetime Creative Arts Emmy Awards	2025	Outstanding Stunt Performance	Justice Hedenberg, Katie Rowe, and Erik Martin (for "Cold Harbor")	Nominated	
Producers Guild of America Awards	2023	Outstanding Producer of Episodic Television, Drama	Ben Stiller, Nicholas Weinstock, Jackie Cohn, Mark Friedman, Dan Erickson, Andrew Colville, Chris Black, John Cameron, Jill Footlick, Kari Drake, Adam Scott, Patricia Arquette, Aoife McArdle, Amanda Overton, and Gerry Robert Byrne	Nominated	
Satellite Awards	2023	Best Drama Series	Severance	Nominated	
Satellite Awards	2023	Best Actor in a Drama / Genre Series	Adam Scott	Nominated	
Satellite Awards	2026	Best Drama Series	Severance	Nominated	
Satellite Awards	2026	Best Actor in a Drama / Genre Series	Adam Scott	Nominated	
Satellite Awards	2026	Best Actress in a Drama or Genre Series	Britt Lower	Nominated	
Satellite Awards	2026	Best Actor in a Supporting Role in a Series, Miniseries & Limited Series, or Motion Picture Made for Television	Tramell Tillman	Nominated	
Saturn Awards	2022	Best Streaming Horror/Thriller Television Series	Severance	Nominated	
Saturn Awards	2022	Best Actor in a Streaming Television Series	Adam Scott	Nominated	
Saturn Awards	2022	Best Actress in a Streaming Television Series	Britt Lower	Nominated	
Saturn Awards	2022	Best Supporting Actor in a Streaming Television Series	Zach Cherry	Nominated	
Saturn Awards	2022	Best Supporting Actor in a Streaming Television Series	John Turturro	Nominated	
Saturn Awards	2022	Best Supporting Actress in a Streaming Television Series	Patricia Arquette	Nominated	
Saturn Awards	2026	Best Science Fiction Television Series	Severance	Nominated	
Saturn Awards	2026	Best Actor in a Television Series	Adam Scott	Nominated	
Saturn Awards	2026	Best Actress in a Television Series	Britt Lower	Nominated	
Screen Actors Guild Awards	2023	Outstanding Performance by a Male Actor in a Drama Series	Adam Scott	Nominated	
Screen Actors Guild Awards	2023	Outstanding Performance by an Ensemble in a Drama Series	Patricia Arquette, Michael Chernus, Zach Cherry, Michael Cumpsty, Dichen Lachman, Britt Lower, Adam Scott, Tramell Tillman, Jen Tullock, John Turturro, and Christopher Walken	Nominated	
Screen Actors Guild Awards	2025	Outstanding Performance by a Female Actor in a Drama Series	Britt Lower	Nominated	
Screen Actors Guild Awards	2025	Outstanding Performance by an Ensemble in a Drama Series	Patricia Arquette, Sarah Bock, Michael Chernus, Zach Cherry, Dichen Lachman, Britt Lower, Darri Ólafsson, Adam Scott, Tramell Tillman, Jen Tullock, John Turturro, and Christopher Walken	Nominated	
Seoul International Drama Awards	2025	Golden Bird Prize	Ben Stiller	Won	
Seoul International Drama Awards	2025	Best Director	Ben Stiller	Nominated	
Seoul International Drama Awards	2025	Best Screen Writer	Dan Erickson	Won	
Seoul International Drama Awards	2025	Best Actor	Adam Scott	Nominated	
Set Decorators Society of America Awards	2022	Best Achievement in Décor/Design of a One Hour Contemporary Series	Andrew Baseman and Jeremy Hindle	Nominated	
Set Decorators Society of America Awards	2025	Best Achievement in Décor/Design of a One Hour Contemporary Series	David Schlesinger and Jeremy Hindle	Won	
Society of Composers & Lyricists Awards	2023	Outstanding Score for Television	Theodore Shapiro	Nominated	
Television Critics Association Awards	2022	Program of the Year	Severance	Nominated	
Television Critics Association Awards	2022	Outstanding Achievement in Drama	Severance	Nominated	
Television Critics Association Awards	2022	Outstanding New Program	Severance	Nominated	
Television Critics Association Awards	2022	Individual Achievement in Drama	Adam Scott	Nominated	
Television Critics Association Awards	2025	Program of the Year	Severance	Nominated	
Television Critics Association Awards	2025	Outstanding Achievement in Drama	Severance	Nominated	
Television Critics Association Awards	2025	Individual Achievement in Drama	Britt Lower	Nominated	
Television Critics Association Awards	2025	Individual Achievement in Drama	Adam Scott	Nominated	
Television Critics Association Awards	2025	Individual Achievement in Drama	Tramell Tillman	Nominated	
Venice TV Awards	2023	Best TV Series	Severance	Nominated	
Visual Effects Society Awards	2023	Outstanding Supporting Visual Effects in a Photoreal Episode	Vadim Turchin, Nicole Melius, David Piombino, and David Rouxel (for "Pilot")	Nominated	
Visual Effects Society Awards	2026	Outstanding Supporting Visual Effects in a Photoreal Episode	Eric Leven, Sean Findley, Brian Holligan, Radost Ridlen (for "Hello, Ms. Cobel")	Nominated	
Webby Awards	2022	Best Actor	Adam Scott	Won	
Writers Guild of America Awards	2023	Drama Series	Chris Black, Andrew Colville, Kari Drake, Dan Erickson, Mark Friedman, Helen Leigh, Anna Moench, and Amanda Overton	Won	
Writers Guild of America Awards	2023	New Series	Chris Black, Andrew Colville, Kari Drake, Dan Erickson, Mark Friedman, Helen Leigh, Anna Moench, and Amanda Overton	Won	
Writers Guild of America Awards	2023	Episodic Drama	Dan Erickson (for "The We We Are")	Nominated	
