= Gemma Scout =

Severance character

- Severance character
- Gemma in the home she shared with husband Mark
- First appearance: "Half Loop" (2022)
- Created by: Dan Erickson
- Portrayed by: Dichen Lachman

In-universe information
- Alias: Ms. Casey
- Family: Devon Scout-Hale (sister-in-law); Ricken Hale (brother-in-law); Eleanor Scout-Hale (niece)
- Spouse: Mark Scout
- Origin: Ganz, PE

Gemma Scout and Ms. Casey are fictional characters on the Apple TV+ series Severance created by Dan Erickson. They are portrayed by Dichen Lachman.

Gemma is first mentioned as the late wife of protagonist Mark Scout, but is later revealed to work at Lumon Industries as wellness counselor Casey. Both she and Mark had undergone a procedure known as severance to divide their memories and personalities in two, allowing their work selves to interact without either being aware of their previous relationship.

== Overview ==
=== Prior to Lumon ===
Gemma was a Russian literature professor employed at Ganz College. She married fellow university professor Mark Scout (Adam Scott), whom she met at a Lumon blood drive. The couple was close to Mark's sister Devon (Jen Tullock) and her husband Ricken Hale (Michael Chernus), who wanted to name their daughter after her, though Mark declined.

After Gemma suffered a miscarriage, she and Mark visited the Butzemann Fertility Center run by Lumon, where she signed up for IVF treatments that ultimately proved unsuccessful. Sometime later, Lumon faked Gemma's death by staging a car accident on a night that she was out alone visiting friends for a game of charades. Though the exact circumstances of her kidnapping is unknown, Gemma's involvement includes turning her into a test subject for Lumon's experiments with the severance technology. Unable to bear the grief of Gemma's loss, Mark took to drinking and was subsequently fired from his teaching job, resulting in him taking a severed job at Lumon.

=== At Lumon ===
Gemma is revealed to be a subject on the testing floor of the Lumon headquarters in the season two episode "Chikhai Bardo", where she has been held captive for over two years. She retains her memories and is sent each day to different rooms (whose names correspond to Macro Data Refinement [MDR] files), each of which creates a different innie made to endure unpleasant experiences such as a dental appointment or airplane turbulence. Her sessions in these rooms are overseen by the lecherous Dr. Mauer (Robby Benson), who acts out different roles in each of the rooms and interviews Gemma afterwards to assess whether she has retained any memories from the experiences. Meanwhile, Gemma's inpatient care is handled by her nurse, Cecily (Sandra Bernhard), and her ward contains a music player and copies of her favorite Russian literature. Gemma often plays the song "I'll Be Seeing You", which is implied to evoke memories of her relationship with Mark.

Gemma is occasionally sent up to the severed floor where she becomes a part-time innie known as Ms. Casey, who serves as Lumon's wellness counselor for other severed employees. During these sessions, she is instructed to read a list of outie facts, while the employee being treated is told to enjoy each fact equally. The sessions are monitored remotely by Harmony Cobel (Patricia Arquette), who observes the employee's reaction to the treatment through a hidden camera. She interacts on several occasions with her husband Mark, though neither recognizes the other, as both are severed.

During the season 1 episode "The You You Are", Ms. Casey is instructed to light a candle that was stolen from a box labeled 'Gemma's Crafts' during a wellness session with innie Mark, and he is given a ball of clay to sculpt how he feels. He sculpts a tree that is presumed to be the site of Gemma's supposed crash while Ms. Casey observes him. In "The Grim Barbarity of Optics and Design", she is instructed by Cobel to observe Helly R. in MDR for "signs of sadness, and to verbally encourage her to avoid further suicide attempts." However, she is sent to the break room in "Hide and Seek" as a punishment after Helly leaves to wander around the severed floor. Upon finding out, Mark retaliates by rebelling and getting sent to the break room in her place. In the episode "What's for Dinner?", Ms. Casey later confesses to Mark that the eight hours she spent in his department was "her favorite time" as it was "the longest [she's] ever been awake." At the end of season 1, she is removed from her position as a wellness counselor and sent back down to the testing floor indefinitely.

During the use of the overtime contingency in the season 1 finale, Mark's innie learns that Ms. Casey is his wife after finding a photo from his outie's wedding to Gemma in Devon's home. The season ends with innie Mark holding the wedding photo and informing Devon that "she's alive". When he returns to the severed floor in the season 2 episode "Hello Ms. Cobel", he resolves to find and rescue her, but finds that the wellness room has been decommissioned. Upon receiving his innie's message, outie Mark initially struggles to believe that Gemma is still alive. However, his doubts are later assuaged by Asal Reghabi (Karen Aldridge), a former Lumon employee. In the episode "Who is Alive?", Mark agrees to the reintegration procedure in hopes of seeing Gemma again.

Over the course of the second season, Mark works on refining the numbers in latest MDR file called 'Cold Harbor', whose corresponding room on the testing floor is the one room Gemma has not yet visited. Gemma asks Dr. Mauer whether she will be allowed to see Mark again after visiting all the rooms, but he does not provide a clear answer. He later lies to Gemma that Mark has remarried and fathered a daughter, and suggests that she too may have "moved on" in one of the testing rooms. Gemma knocks Dr. Mauer unconscious with a chair and steals his keycard in an attempt to escape via the elevator, but upon arriving on the severed floor, she turns into Ms. Casey, whom Milchick (Tramell Tillman) simply ushers back into the elevator, keeping Gemma trapped on the testing floor.

In the season 2 finale, Mark and his innie learn from Cobel that the numbers MDR refines are actually being used to create new innies for Gemma. Mark realizes that completing the 25th file, 'Cold Harbor', will unlock a new innie for Gemma that Lumon plans to test, and kill Gemma once the test has been completed. After Mark's innie completes the 'Cold Harbor' file, he rushes to save Gemma. On the testing floor, Gemma is instructed by Cecily to put on the same clothes she wore the day she was kidnapped. She is then led to the 'Cold Harbor' room, where she severs into an innie who is tasked by Dr. Mauer to dismantle a baby crib while "I'll Be Seeing You" is piped through the speakers. She is observed remotely by Dr. Mauer and Jame Eagan (Michael Siberry), who are satisfied that she "feels nothing" while dismantling the crib.

Mark's innie uses security guard Mr. Drummond (Ólafur Darri Ólafsson) to get down to the testing floor, accidentally killing Drummond with a Captive bolt pistol when he turns into his outie. Mark's outie then uses Drummond's body to hold open the elevator doors, and Drummond's blood to enter the 'Cold Harbor' room. There, he sees Gemma's innie, who he rescues by leading her out of the room. Once out of the room, Gemma recognizes Mark and they reunite, embracing for a moment before rushing to the elevator. The two share a kiss in the elevator before severing into innie Mark and Ms. Casey when they reach the severed floor. Mark's innie leads Ms. Casey to the exit stairwell, where she steps through the exit door and reverts back to Gemma. Gemma begs innie Mark to leave with her, but he chooses to stay on the severed floor with Helly, leaving Gemma distraught.

== Characterization ==
=== Ms. Casey ===
Ms. Casey appears in season one as a mysterious wellness counselor for Lumon and conducts wellness sessions with severed Lumon employees.

Dichen Lachman said that she "imagined [Ms. Casey] like a child, or like a doe, like an animal being born into the world and just learning to walk and absorbing everything around them. To some degree she has to do what she's told. She's very literal." At San Diego Comic Con 2022, Lachman said that there was "a lot of tinkering" involved in the crafting of Ms. Casey, and the scripts took her around "3 months to memorize" due to their specificity. Executive producer Ben Stiller referenced a scene in season 1 episode "What's for Dinner?" where Milchick sends Ms. Casey down the hallway of the exports hall, saying that this was the "first hint that we really are feeling that there's something inside Ms. Casey, this sadness."

Ms. Casey is revealed to be Gemma at the end of the episode "Defiant Jazz", when Mark pieces back together a photo of her he had ripped apart. Creator Dan Erickson said that "the reveal that Ms. Casey is Gemma landed the way that it did, not just because it was surprising and shocking, but all of a sudden it was because this question of, "What do we do here?" is tied inextricably to the loss and the marriage. Because whatever it is that we're doing here, that is what caused [Mark's] happy, domestic life to be ripped away from [him], and the love of [his] life to be ripped away from [him]."

=== Gemma Scout ===
Though she is revealed to be Mark's wife in the first season, Gemma is only shown during brief flashes on screen until the season 2 episode "Chikhai Bardo", where her backstory and subsequent time in Lumon is explored.

Going into the second season, Erickson listed Gemma's escape as one of the main goals of the season, saying, "I really wanted to get Gemma out, because I thought of myself as a viewer and how I would feel if two seasons in, she was still stuck down there. I could just see myself getting antsy or getting annoyed." He also explained balancing the mystery of the show and character work with regards to waiting until the second half of the season to reveal what was happening to Gemma on the testing floor. Earlier versions of the season included "checking in" with her throughout, with the first scene of the season initially being Gemma on the testing floor and "unveiling what was going on with her". The idea was later shelved in favor of a standalone episode. Erickson explained, "The fact she has been living this painfully solitary existence for years—giving her her own episode independent of everybody else felt like the best way to convey that feeling."

Director Jessica Lee Gagné described Gemma as "this very nuanced woman who was strong, funny, and had all these beautiful qualities, and was also a really sensitive person." Gagné worked closely with Lachman to craft her character, stating, "Dichen and I talked about what it's like to be a prisoner, like for a lifelong prisoner. You go through different phases, and it basically depends where you are in this cycle in terms of what you're feeling. There are moments of hope, and then there's moments of despair, and there's moments of anger, and you move through those emotions." She also recounted the pressure of introducing Gemma, saying, "She could have just been a prisoner. There was a lot of looking at each scene, speaking with Dichen, and saying, 'Okay, what's really going on here?'" Stiller was also concerned about the reasons why Gemma would not abandon hope after being held captive for over two years, which Gagné explained as "trying to get in a moment for her where she would have been hopeful—or had a spark that she could have been on the edge of Am I going to try something?".

On expanding Gemma's character in season 2, Erickson stated:

We've seen her in such a diminished capacity at Lumon, where we've gotten to know her as Ms. Casey. And I've always thought of Ms. Casey as a corporate automaton with a human being somewhere deep down inside her that is trying to get out, and that's why she asked questions. She's curious, she's compassionate, she worries about the people around her — like in Season 1, when Mark and Helly go off to see the goats, she says, "I was scared." All of these traits are in there, they're just very muted. With all the characters, when you see their Outie, the question is always, to what degree are their Innies different? But also, to what degree are they essentially the same? So Ms. Casey's traits of being intellectually curious and kind and compassionate and worrying about others were a basis to start on for finding out who Gemma is.

For the different innies Gemma severs into on the testing floor, Gagné collaborated with writer Mark Friedman "to try and find the core essence of each scene, how we could bring out the humanity in each piece". Both Gagné and Friedman were acutely aware of needing "people to love" Gemma, noting they tried "to still make some of it light and pleasant and lively, because there's so much weight to it as well, so it was tricky to balance out. In terms of her within these rooms, we got to create all new characters." Costume designer Sarah Edwards recounted that Gemma was "dressed appropriately for the test [Lumon was] doing on her" and described her costumes as "weirdly retro, but it isn't a specific period. And that is always the challenge with Severance. It isn't '50s, it isn't '60s, it isn't '70s, but it has a feeling of all of those periods."

== Relationships ==
=== Mark Scout ===
Gemma's marriage to Mark is a major focal point of her character, and their relationship is hinted to be the reason for the success of the refinement process. Her supposed death is the main motivator for Mark to undergo the severance procedure, and he spends much of the first season grieving her. On Mark's journey in season one, Adam Scott said, "When we start the show, Mark has decided that he's not going to move on from this grief. He just doesn't want to feel it all day; he's going to leave for 10 hours a day or whatever so he doesn't have to deal with it. It's almost like the grief is all he has left of his wife, so he doesn't want to let go of it. He wants to wallow in it as long as he can."

Gemma's death is said to have been caused by a car accident near a tree, which Mark visits in the season 1 episode "The You You Are". Later, innie Mark sculpts a tree out of clay in a wellness session, implying that certain memories are able to leak through the severance barriers. On threading the needle of their relationship, Stiller says, "There’s a scene that I added that I really wanted to have, where he gets sent to the break room and she’s leaving it, and they pass each other in the narrow hallway. That was as close as I wanted to get to seeing a connection between these people. It’s funny: even the smallest look, I was nervous that was going to give too much away."

Mark and Gemma's relationship is referred to throughout the show, but is mainly explored through flashback sequences in the episode "Chikhai Bardo". Erickson emphasized the importance of the flashbacks "to see on Mark's side that this is the version of him that he was before his loss. That involves joy, and that involves humor, and that involves warmth. We wanted those to be traits that they shared with each other. We wanted to be sure that they as a couple felt lived-in. They had jokes that were theirs and they could mess with each other, but at the end of the day, they were a very loving couple."

On crafting Mark and Gemma's relationship, Scott explained that they needed "to build everything as specific and big and complete as possible" in order to "do these little flashes and get what felt like a complete picture." In an interview with AwardsWatch, Scott said, "For those last moments of the season to work, Dichen had this episode to show who Gemma is, and what she did was incredible. She, in a very small plot of real estate, was able to create this full person, and everybody just fell in love with Gemma. She is this vivacious, interesting person, and you see now why Outie Mark is such a shell, because he needed Gemma to complete him and to show him how to be a person in a sense, like she made him whole out there. So it made a lot of things click into place."

Gagné emphasised the importance of making their relationship feel grounded and real, saying, "It would've been easier for [Mark] to grieve something that was perfect. The fact that they leave each other on a note where things are unresolved gives more guilt and more weight in his journey." Certain heavier sequences were also tweaked during rehearsals for the episode, with Gagné explaining that "there was this realness and lightness that also served the flashbacks so well because there’s a lot of really heavy themes, but then we needed these moments of bounce between light and dark." She also wanted the scenes between Gemma and Mark to "evoke nostalgia", deciding to shoot on film to "make this feel like the most home-video-esque thing. It's transitioning with crazy things, but at the same time, when we land in this world, it's so simple and it's an album of life. It's a kaleidoscope of images of beauty and love and seasons." One of the main challenges of directing the episode for Gagné was showing the evolution of Mark and Gemma's relationship over the course of five years. As such, she enlisted Stiller to shoot found footage-like sequences with Lachman and Scott in between camera set-ups for a montage in the episode.

Throughout "Chikhai Bardo", the flashbacks of Mark and Gemma are juxtaposed with Gemma's captivity on the testing floor. Erickson stated:

I really liked this as an idea, conceptually, that in this episode, both Mark and Gemma are trying to get to each other. We see Gemma is literally trying to get to him, to break out of the testing floor, only to make it up to the Severed Floor where she turns back into Ms. Casey and turns around of her own accord. I found that one moment really heartbreaking. Then Mark is unconscious, but in his mind, he's trying to find his wife and sifting through these different memories and trying to figure out what's real. The memory that Mark has of their marriage, which he had sort of presented as this perfect thing, shows that it might not have been. He may be remembering it the way that he needs to, as opposed to the way it actually happened. Memory can be imperfect, but at the same time, the story that gets patch-worked together through your memories ends up creating your identity, or at least the way that you think about yourself.

In the season two finale, the MDR numbers that Mark has been refining are revealed by Cobel to be Gemma's tempers. On the implications of the reveal, Erickson explains, "I loved the idea that this whole time that Mark has been sitting there looking at this mysterious sea of data, that he was actually staring into the mind of the woman that he’s mourning on the outside. That was the emotional seed that was important to me. He’s finding her tempers, and he’s able to recognize them because, on a deep level, that transcends severance. He knows her, he understands her, and he can see the pieces of her soul and identify them. He’s able to use them to build these new versions of her, and the reason that it works is because he loves her so much."

=== Devon Scout-Hale and Ricken Hale ===
Gemma is said to have shared a close relationship with Mark's sister Devon and her husband Ricken before her supposed death. Along with Mark, the quartet often hung out and went on hiking trips together. Tullock explained that "[Gemma’s] absence really fractured them so that it created distance between Ricken and Mark. It created distance between Ricken and Devon.” The relationship between Gemma, Mark, Devon, and Ricken was also explored in "Chikhai Bardo", which Chernus referred to as a "more buoyant time" in the characters' lives. Tullock said shooting the flashback sequences “felt like such a breath of fresh air to be able to talk to each other and touch each other because it had only ever been alluded to."

After Gemma's death, both Devon and Ricken wanted to name their daughter after Gemma as a tribute, but Mark refused. Ricken's book, The You You Are, is dedicated to Gemma.

== Development ==
=== Creation ===
Series creator Dan Erickson described Gemma as "the hardest character to write," saying "We tried a lot of different things with her. The writing and the crafting of her character continued well into after we had hired Dichen, because we knew that this character was going to turn out to be Mark's wife. At one point it was like, well maybe it's Helly. But that felt, it's like too obvious. Like someone will guess that. And so we wanted this character that we could really hide in plain sight, where she would make sense as just an interesting kind of strange part of, piece of the Lumon furniture. And she would be somebody where we're not looking for what's the twist with her, because she sort of feels self-contained on her own."

According to Erickson, the writers tried out a variety of character ideas for Mark's wife on the severed floor; for a long time they developed her as a traveling vendor who sold office supplies to the different departments, similar to an old west peddler in the style of a prospector. This idea was discarded as it was "too weird."

=== Name ===
Gemma's name on the severed floor went through a number of variations before Erickson landed on Ms. Casey, which he said was "the melding of a first name and a last name." As severed characters are generally referred to by their first names and unsevered characters by their last names, her name was supposed to "invoke this idea that she's of both worlds."

=== Casting ===
Dichen Lachman was cast as Ms. Casey in December 2020. Casting director Rachel Tenner recounted that the role of Ms. Casey "was our hardest role, because it's the most mysterious role." She explained:

We were trying so hard to find someone, not only acting-wise, but also who brought a sense of mystery and is so physically enigmatic. When we finally found her, you’re at the end of such a long journey of trying to find it, and then you see it, and you’re like, “Oh my God.” It’s just this great feeling. We had her do a little scene Dan wrote just for the process, where it showed her as Mark’s wife, because everything she was doing was so stylized for Ms. Casey. We just needed to see something else to know for sure she could go wherever we needed her to go. That was a hard one.

Ben Stiller said that it was "hard for [him] to remember other people who read for the role because when [he] saw what [Dichen was] doing, it's like, okay, that's the person for this role." Scott noted that Lachman's tape was "very different than what everyone else had done", adding that her portrayal of Ms. Casey was "elegant".

== Reception ==
Reviewers noted how Ms. Casey's behavior on the severed floor appeared mechanical and strange. Dhruv Sharma of Screen Rant described her personality as "robotic" and "one dimensional." Erin Qualey of Vulture wrote that the character "evoke[s] a very strange yet warm presence" and "she seems like she was pulled right off the assembly line at Westworld." Qualey described the reveal of Mark's wife Gemma being present on the severed floor as Ms. Casey as an "emotional gut punch." Reviewer Mary Littlejohn of TV Fanatic wrote, "It undermines the whole throughline of Mark's grief — or, maybe in some way, makes it more tragic. Innie Mark has access to Gemma, but he doesn't recognize her — he doesn't even know he was ever married."

Lachman's portrayal of Gemma in season two received positive responses from television critics, with many deeming her one of the highlights of the season. Jean Henegan of Pop Culture Maniacs praised Lachman's performance, calling her work "nothing short of extraordinary." Henegan added, "Taking on all of those different characters, showing us with her measured delivery Gemma’s anger, frustration, suffering without once raising her voice, and then showing us the layers of just who Gemma was in the past – the professor, the wife, the friend (that sequence with her and Devon did so much to underscore that her “death” was, in fact, devastating to people other than Mark), the woman longing for a child but dealing with infertility issues, is hard over the course of a season of television. But pulling all of that off in a single episode? I’m plain in awe of Lachman’s work."

Randy Allain of The Pop Break lauded Gemma as "the heart of the series", writing that "Lachman makes an absolute feast of this showcase episode and transforms Gemma/Ms. Casey from a quirky, abstract mystery machine to a beloved character who must be saved, no matter the cost." Brady Langmann of Esquire recounted that "as soon as the episode dropped, multiple friends texted me varying versions of ... Wow. And I really can't remember the last time so many people messaged me about something they watched. It's a beautiful thing."

Saloni Gajjar of the A.V. Club wrote, "At long last, Severance also gives Lachman the spotlight. The actor secures her Emmy spot with a visceral, moving performance. Lachman’s expressive eyes are a window to her character’s soul here. It’s not a shocker that Gagné ends the episode with the camera lingering on Gemma’s twinkling eyes—one of many, many unforgettable shots in her directorial debut. What a final note to wrap up on to ensure we’ll think about “Chikhai Bardo” long after the credits roll." Gajjar also praised Lachman's chemistry with Scott, writing that "We know it’s short-lived domestic bliss, but Scott and Lachman give it their all to make Mark and Gemma’s bond feel lived-in with sweet, sexy vibes." Alan Sepinwall from Rolling Stone also praised their chemistry, stating that "Gemma feels like an actual person, rather than a Reghabi-style MacGuffin." Carlos Diaz of That Shelf wrote that "Their chemistry is undeniable, their bond real and deeply felt, which makes the tragedy of their loss—suggested to be a miscarriage—all the more heartbreaking. Seeking hope, they turn to a fertility clinic—which may or may not be connected to Lumon—only for fate to once again twist their story in ways neither could have imagined."

In May 2025, Gold House honored Lachman as the winner of the Outstanding Supporting Performance of the Gold List for Television 2025.
