= The Grim Barbarity of Optics and Design =

- Severance episode
- Irving and Burt in O&D
- Episode no.: Season 1 Episode 5
- Directed by: Aoife McArdle
- Written by: Anna Ouyang Moench
- Cinematography by: Jessica Lee Gagné
- Editing by: Gershon Hinkson; Geoffrey Richman
- Original release date: March 11, 2022
- Running time: 43 minutes

Guest appearances
- Michael Cumpsty as Doug Graner; Nikki M. James as Alexa; Nora Dale as Gabby Arteta

Episode chronology
← Previous "The You You Are"	Next → "Hide and Seek"

"The Grim Barbarity of Optics and Design" is the fifth episode of the first season of the American science fiction psychological thriller television series Severance. The episode was written by Anna Ouyang Moench, and directed by producer Aoife McArdle. It was released on Apple TV+ on March 11, 2022.

The series follows employees of Lumon Industries, a biotechnology corporation that uses a medical procedure called "severance" to separate the memories of their employees: at work, Lumon employees, called "innies", can't remember anything outside of work. Outside work, Lumon employees, called "outies", can't remember anything about work. As a result, innies and outies experience two different lives, with distinct personalities and agendas. In the episode, Helly survives her suicide attempt, while Irving tries to find more about Optics and Design.

The episode received highly positive reviews from critics, who praised the writing, character development and tone. For the episode, Christopher Walken received a nomination for Outstanding Supporting Actor in a Drama Series at the 74th Primetime Emmy Awards.

== Plot ==
Mark (Adam Scott) goes to leave for the day, but is shocked to find Helly (Britt Lower) hanging in the elevator. As he holds her, Graner (Michael Cumpsty) arrives to cut the extension cord and forces Mark to get into the elevator to leave. A shaken Mark soon shifts into his outie personality.

The following day, Mark finds Cobel (Patricia Arquette) and Milchick (Tramell Tillman) waiting for him. Cobel informs him that Helly has been hospitalized, and that she will return in a few days since her outie refused to quit in the wake of the suicide attempt. Cobel blames Mark for the incident, telling him it happened under his watch. However, she neglects to tell Lumon's board about the suicide attempt. Graner, who Cobel assigned to investigate Petey's chip, confirms that Petey's memory was reintegrated. Mark continues secretly reading Ricken's self-help book in the office, finding that it encourages the reader to challenge authority.

After his shift is over, Mark goes to a birthing lodge where Devon (Jen Tullock) has gone after beginning labor. Devon goes for a walk and meets a fellow expectant mother named Gabby (Nora Dale) in the cabin next to hers. When Ricken (Michael Chernus) asks why Mark has not yet thanked him for his book, Mark reveals that he never received the book and posits that someone stole it from his doorstep. Early the next morning, Mark waits outside while Devon gives birth to a girl.

Helly returns to Lumon, and Mark helps her innie transition back into the office. Per Cobel's instructions, Ms. Casey (Dichen Lachman) is assigned to observe Helly. While using the printer, Irving (John Turturro) discovers a disturbing painting depicting O&D workers slaughtering MDR workers, consistent with rumors of a violent coup by O&D years ago. Milchick arrives and apologizes, claiming he sent the painting to the wrong printer by accident and that it was intended as a joke for Cobel, but he is soon revealed to have intentionally shown Irving the painting to discourage him from spending time with Burt. Irving, however, decides to visit O&D for answers.

Mark intentionally spills coffee, forcing Ms. Casey to leave the room to find new notepads. While she is gone, Mark takes Helly on a walk through Lumon's hallways, where he shows her that he has tried to reassemble Petey's map and asks for her help, but she refuses. As he tries to convince her, they find a room where a man is feeding baby goats, claiming "they are not ready." Cobel watches them on the cameras; Graner admonishes her for letting the innies discover other departments, but she replies that "the best way to tame a prisoner is to convince them that they are free."

Irving finds Burt (Christopher Walken) in the conference room, having been tipped off by Ms. Casey. Before they can talk, Dylan (Zach Cherry) locks Burt in the room, confronting him over lying about the number of employees at O&D. Burt admits they do not trust MDR due to rumors circulating around their office. Irving releases Burt, who in turn takes them to O&D. There, they find a painting nearly identical to the one Irving found, except it instead depicts MDR slaughtering the O&D workers. Meanwhile, Mark tells Helly he is happy to have her on his team and apologizes for not being able to do more to help her; Helly agrees to help Mark complete Petey's drawing, just as Ms. Casey returns to continue the observation. Burt takes Irving and Dylan to O&D's back room and introduces them as friends to the rest of his team.

== Development ==
=== Production ===
The episode was written by Anna Ouyang Moench, and directed by producer Aoife McArdle. This marked Moench's first writing credit, and McArdle's second directing credit.

== Critical reception ==
"The Grim Barbarity of Optics and Design" received highly positive reviews from critics. Matt Schimkowitz of The A.V. Club gave the episode an "A–" and wrote, "To make up for lost time, Burt takes Irving and Dylan to introduce them to his whole team. The proverbial walls are coming down, and Severance is about to kick into high gear."

Erin Qualey of Vulture gave the episode a perfect 5 star rating out of 5 and wrote, "It's not hyperbole to say that Severance is the most visually arresting show on TV today. Along with the gorgeous costuming, deft art direction, meticulous production design, and spot-on cinematography, the entire credit sequence is a glorious work of clay-like animation designed to compliment [sic] the series' artistic sensibilities. I can't stop watching it. And the setting – Eero Saarinen's stunning Bell Labs – is a real-world piece of mid-century modern art that serves as a crucial centerpiece for the narrative."

Oliver VanDervoort of Game Rant wrote, "One of the reasons Severance is so good is that the simple truth is that those answers don't have to be spelled out. The show relies on keeping people off balance and for the most part, it works incredibly well. Some shows could go out of their way to be weird to the point where it's annoying, but Ben Stiller's show continues to handle it almost perfectly." Breeze Riley of Telltale TV gave the episode a 4 star rating out of 5 and wrote, "If you thought a show about people being severed into two different conscious[ness]es couldn't get weirder, I'm happy to report that you're wrong. Severance Season 1 Episode 5, 'The Grim Barbarity Of Optics and Design', makes its predecessors look mundane in comparison."

Mary Littlejohn of TV Fanatic gave the episode a 4 star rating out of 5 and wrote, "Will Severance give us the tools to break free of the system we see ourselves trapped in, or will watching the Macrodata team do it be enough to satiate us?" Caemeron Crain of TV Obsessive wrote, "Perhaps the whole purpose of Lumon centers on the manipulation of emotion itself, with O&D not just putting up paintings but tracking the responses to them and doing some kind of data entry that then gets kicked over to MDR for refinement. But the overall vision and Ms. Casey's role in it remains something I don't even have a good speculative guess about."

=== Awards and accolades ===
Christopher Walken submitted the episode to support his nomination for Outstanding Supporting Actor in a Drama Series at the 74th Primetime Emmy Awards. He would lose to Matthew Macfadyen for Succession.
