= The You You Are =

- Severance episode
- Mr. Milchick with The You You Are.
- Episode no.: Season 1 Episode 4
- Directed by: Aoife McArdle
- Written by: Kari Drake
- Cinematography by: Jessica Lee Gagné; Jeremy Hindle
- Editing by: Erica Freed Marker; Geoffrey Richman
- Original release date: March 4, 2022
- Running time: 46 minutes

Guest appearances
- Yul Vazquez as Peter "Petey" Kilmer; Joanne Kelly as Nina; Michael Cumpsty as Doug Graner

Episode chronology
← Previous "In Perpetuity"	Next → "The Grim Barbarity of Optics and Design"

"The You You Are" is the fourth episode of the first season of the American science fiction psychological thriller television series Severance. The episode was written by co-executive producer Kari Drake, and directed by producer Aoife McArdle. It was released on Apple TV+ on March 4, 2022.

The series follows employees of Lumon Industries, a biotechnology corporation that uses a medical procedure called "severance" to separate the memories of their employees: at work, Lumon employees, called "innies", can't remember anything outside of work. Outside work, Lumon employees, called "outies", can't remember anything about work. As a result, innies and outies experience two different lives, with distinct personalities and agendas. In the episode, Helly reaches her breaking point in getting her resignation request, while Mark receives an update on Petey's status.

The episode received highly positive reviews from critics, who praised the writing, performances, directing, and ending.

== Plot ==
In the break room, Helly (Britt Lower) reads the apology statement 259 times, but Milchick (Tramell Tillman) is still not satisfied. The following day, Helly is once again forced to read the statement; it takes her 1,072 attempts to finally pass.

Mark (Adam Scott) misses the call on Petey's phone and stashes it, noticing several missed calls from the same blocked number. At the office, Burt (Christopher Walken) visits MDR to invite the staff to visit O&D, but only Irving (John Turturro) accepts the offer. Burt shows him his artwork, and they grow close, although Irving chooses to leave when Burt touches his hand. On his way back, Irving finds Ricken's book left behind by Milchick. Helly finds that Mark kept Petey's map of Lumon's hallways, with Dylan (Zach Cherry) warning that he must report it to management. Helly castigates Mark for not caring about Petey; Mark shreds the drawing in response.

Irving shows Mark and Dylan the book; they find a personal note from Ricken to Mark on the first page, unaware of what it means. Mark wants to report it, but Dylan states that he could get involved as the book was given to him. Mark hides the book in his desk, and Dylan secretly begins reading it while Mark is gone. Helly grabs a paper cutter and threatens Cobel (Patricia Arquette) with self-mutilation unless she is granted a recorded resignation request. Cobel allows it, and Helly leaves the floor with the recording. However, she returns to discover that her outie has denied her request. In a recorded statement, Helly's outie coldly asserts that she is a person whereas her innie is not, and that she will make her innie's life miserable if she ever harms herself.

That night, Mark receives a news notification reporting that Petey died from an "unknown ailment." Mark attends his funeral, even though he claims to not know much about Petey. Cobel also attends by posing as Mrs. Selvig, and secretly extracts the severance chip from Petey's corpse during the service. Affected by the funeral, Mark visits the tree where his late wife suffered her fatal car crash. The following day, Cobel has Ms. Casey perform a "special" wellness check on Mark, which she watches remotely. Ms. Casey assigns Mark to sculpt his feelings with clay, and the resulting sculpture resembles the tree he visited. While leaving Burt's office, Irving discovers that O&D actually has at least seven employees, working in a massive unlabeled back room. Helly leaves the office with an extension cord and uses it to hang herself in the elevator.

== Development ==
=== Production ===
The episode was written by co-executive producer Kari Drake, and directed by producer Aoife McArdle. This marked Drake's first writing credit, and McArdle's first directing credit.

== Critical reception ==
"The You You Are" received highly positive reviews from critics. Matt Schimkowitz of The A.V. Club gave the episode an "A–" and wrote, "Shoutout to Aoife McArdle, who took over directing duties for Ben Stiller in this episode. She does a terrific job, especially in the scene of Helly leaving after filming her resignation video, confident she won't be back, only to return in different clothes in the blink of an eye."

Erin Qualey of Vulture gave the episode a perfect 5 star rating out of 5 and wrote, "This is the second week in a row that Severance has left us on a death cliffhanger, and while Petey is dead, I'm not so sure about Helly. We literally just met her aggro outie, so there seems to be a lot more to her story."

Oliver VanDervoort of Game Rant wrote, "While most of the other episodes of Severance have been equal parts humor and the absurdity of the work environment, there wasn't much to laugh at in this particular episode. The show probably needed an episode like this, because when push comes to shove, it's important to note that there really isn't anything funny about what's been going on with a company that sends people to some sort of weird torture chamber if they try and pass a note to themselves." Breeze Riley of Telltale TV gave the episode a 3.5 star rating out of 5 and wrote, "Sadly with love comes the opportunity for betrayal, which is how Irving feels upon discovering that Burt is lying about optics and design's real work. Once again Severance introduces a question without an answer, leaving viewers hanging until the next time."

Mary Littlejohn of TV Fanatic gave the episode a 3.5 star rating out of 5 and wrote, "On a meta level, Severance proves that the experience of watching the show is much like the characters' experience living in the show – it's what you make of it. Finding those little moments of humor and joy make it feel worth going through." Caemeron Crain of TV Obsessive wrote, "The you that she is turns out to be a cold-hearted bitch. Of course, she's just as spiteful, or at least that's how I read this final act – it's not that Helly wants to end her own existence because working at Lumon is so terrible, it's that she wants to kill that version of herself who said on the video she wasn't a person. Such an act of will clearly proves that she is, and I wonder what the fallout will be."
