= Chikhai Bardo =

- Severance episode
- Gemma before her dentist appointment.
- Episode no.: Season 2 Episode 7
- Directed by: Jessica Lee Gagné
- Written by: Dan Erickson; Mark Friedman
- Cinematography by: Jessica Lee Gagné
- Editing by: Keith Fraase
- Original release date: February 27, 2025 (Note: The episode was promoted with the global release date of February 28, but released in American time zones on the preceding evening.)
- Running time: 50 minutes

Guest appearances
- Ólafur Darri Ólafsson as Mr. Drummond; Robby Benson as Dr. Mauer; Karen Aldridge as Asal Reghabi; Sandra Bernhard as Nurse Cecily

Episode chronology
← Previous "Attila"	Next → "Sweet Vitriol"

"Chikhai Bardo" is the seventh episode of the second season of the American science fiction psychological thriller television series Severance. It is the 16th overall episode of the series and was written by series creator Dan Erickson and executive producer Mark Friedman, and directed by cinematographer Jessica Lee Gagné in her directorial debut. It was released on Apple TV+ on February 27, 2025.

The series follows employees of Lumon Industries, a biotechnology corporation that uses a medical procedure called "severance" to separate the memories of their employees: at work, Lumon employees, called "innies", can't remember anything outside of work. Outside work, Lumon employees, called "outies", can't remember anything about work. As a result, innies and outies experience two different lives, with distinct personalities and agendas. In the episode, Gemma Scout's relationship with Mark and role within Lumon is recounted. Meanwhile, Devon and Reghabi deal with the aftermath of Mark's seizure.

The episode received acclaim, with many critics praising Gagné's direction and Dichen Lachman's performance, and noting the episode as a standout of the series. The episode borrows its title from the moment of death in Tibetan Buddhism. It was nominated for four Primetime Emmy Awards, winning for Outstanding Production Design.

== Plot ==
=== In the past ===
Gemma and Mark, both professors at Ganz College, meet at a blood drive run by Lumon and quickly hit it off. Their relationship evolves into a loving marriage. Gemma eventually becomes pregnant, which she subtly reveals during lunch with Devon and Ricken, but later suffers a miscarriage.

Sometime afterwards, Gemma and Mark sign up for fertility treatment at a Lumon clinic, but her three rounds of in vitro fertilisation (IVF) all prove unsuccessful. After visiting the clinic, Gemma begins receiving ideographic cards in the mail, including one depicting chikhai bardo. (Note: As seen in "Hide and Seek".) The couple's failure to conceive progressively puts a strain on their marriage, and they ultimately decide to stop trying for the time being. Mark subsequently immerses himself in his work and one night declines an invitation from Gemma to join some friends for an outing. Later that night, the police arrive at his door to tell him Gemma has died in a car accident.

=== At Lumon ===
Gemma lives as a patient on Lumon's testing floor, which consists of various rooms whose names correspond to Macrodata Refinement (MDR) files. Each room awakens a separate innie made to endure an unpleasant experience, such as a dental appointment or airplane turbulence, usually engineered by Dr. Mauer, who acts out different roles in each of the rooms and is himself infatuated with Gemma. (Note: Mauer is also briefly seen at the fertility clinic Mark and Gemma visit.) Gemma visits a handful of these rooms each day, donning a different outfit for each; afterwards, Mauer interviews her about any memories or emotions that linger from the rooms. Gemma is guided between the rooms by her nurse, Cecily, who also manages her inpatient care.

Meanwhile, MDR's activities are revealed to be monitored by another team working in a control room directly below them, overseen by Mr. Drummond, to whom Mauer reports. Mauer confirms to Drummond that Gemma's severance barriers are holding between the rooms; Drummond tells Mauer he will have to bid goodbye to Gemma after Mark completes the Cold Harbor MDR file, which is currently stuck at 96% due to Mark's nosebleed. (Note: As seen in "Attila".) Gemma, who has not yet visited the room labeled Cold Harbor, asks Mauer during an interview what will happen after she has been in all the rooms and whether she will see Mark again, but Mauer answers cryptically.

One day, Mauer enters Gemma's ward to tell her Mark has remarried and fathered a daughter. Gemma is incredulous; when Mauer suggests that she too may have "moved on" while in one of the testing rooms, Gemma knocks him unconscious with a chair, steals his key card and rushes through the hallways until she finds an elevator. Upon ascending to the exports hall, Gemma turns into Ms. Casey, her oblivious innie on the severed floor, whom Milchick simply ushers back into the elevator. Gemma breaks down in tears upon finding herself back on the testing floor with Cecily awaiting her.

=== In the present ===
Mark remains unconscious following his seizure. Reghabi reveals to a distressed Devon that Gemma is indeed alive and that Mark chose to undergo reintegration in order to find her. Devon recalls the birthing retreat where she gave birth to her daughter has an "innie cabin", where severed people become their innie, (Note: As seen in "The Grim Barbarity of Optics and Design".) and wonders if it is possible to reawaken Mark there. She suggests calling Cobel for help on how to access the cabin, but Reghabi urges her not to, warning that Cobel will immediately hand them over to Lumon. She abruptly leaves when Devon appears not to listen to her. Later, Mark finally reawakens, still recalling memories of Gemma.

== Production ==
=== Development ===
The episode was written by series creator Dan Erickson and executive producer Mark Friedman, and directed by Jessica Lee Gagné, the series' director of photography. This marked Erickson's fifth writing credit, Friedman's first writing credit, and Gagné's first directing credit.

Gagné explained that after working on the first season, she hesitated about returning for the second season. Executive producer Ben Stiller proposed that she could direct an episode, and Gagné heavily considered it. She settled on the seventh episode as "I felt a huge connection with it, and I was like, 'Oh, I feel like I'm supposed to do this episode.' And then there was the realization: 'There will never be a safer place for me to make anything than this. I know everyone. I know the cast, the writers, Ben.' Everyone who was around me believed in me and supported me, and that's what really allowed me to do it."

=== Writing ===
Dichen Lachman said that it was essential to show Mark's and Gemma's struggle after a miscarriage, "I thought it was a really important story to tell, because it's such a common thing that women go through. A lot of women feel very isolated when that happens to them, so it was nice to be able to represent that story even when it's not the most important part of the show. I appreciated that, and because two men [Dan Erickson and Mark Friedman] were writing the scripts, they were open to input from Jessica and myself in terms of delicately playing with the balance of that." Adam Scott was very interested in exploring a phase prior to the series, "It was really interesting and completely separate from the rest of the show, as far as how we made it, what it was about. Just the timeline and the material itself was just lifting us up and dropping us into a different world entirely, so it was super fun."

Dan Erickson wanted to explore Gemma's traits, "With all the characters, when you see their Outie, the question is always, to what degree are their Innies different? But also, to what degree are they essentially the same? So Ms. Casey's traits of being intellectually curious and kind and compassionate and worrying about others were a basis to start on for finding out who Gemma is." Erickson noted that while writing the episode, he found similarities to the series Dollhouse, which also had Lachman as a main cast member, commenting "we knew that Dichen was going to be able to do that very well."

=== Filming ===
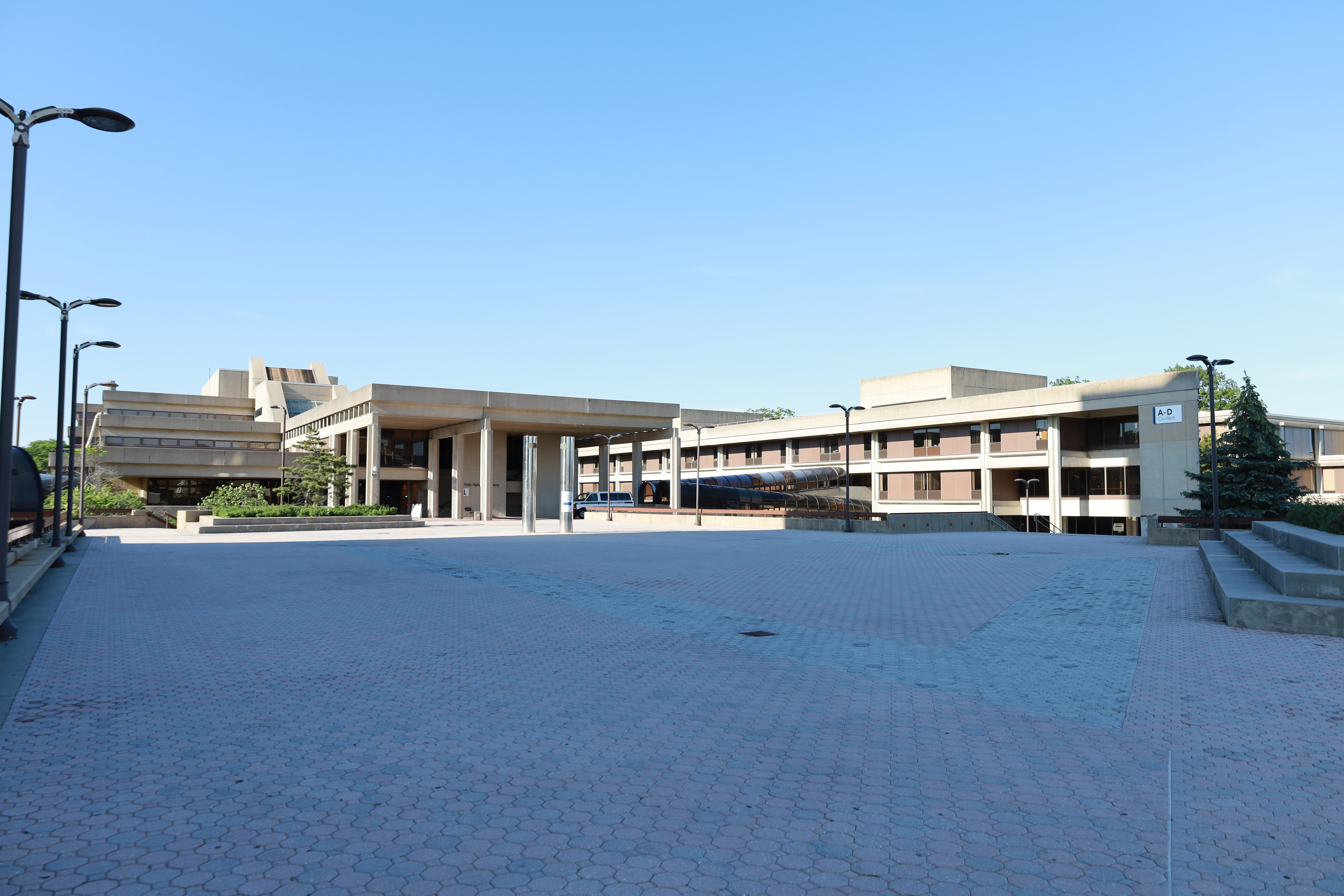
Nassau Community College, where the Ganz College scenes were filmed

The scenes at Ganz College were filmed at Nassau Community College in Garden City, New York. Mark and Gemma's home in the flashback scenes were shot on 16mm film and filmed at Gagné's rented home. Gagné said that the decision to shoot in 16mm film was made to evoke the past: "The idea was: what will give you the most immediate natural feeling of nostalgia? What will evoke that warm emotion within people of memories? There is no better medium than that. So it was an obvious choice, but it's not a simple thing to deal with. But I think it's what made it easy to shoot memories without having to slap on an aesthetic."

Regarding the final scene, Gagné said, "Mark has to experience all the moments he's ever had with Gemma, then realize that she's not there. It's like this bittersweet moment that he's had, where he was able to be with her again. Adam, I could see him get really focused. I was like, Oh, something's gonna happen. And he went in the zone. We did that take. It was so beautiful — just that moment of him getting up in silence. He crushed on that shot. It was my second day of directing, and I wasn't confident enough to say, 'We got it. We can move on.' I was like, 'Let's do a safety?' Like a total idiot. But I'm like, That's the shot. I just didn't have the balls yet."

== Critical reception ==
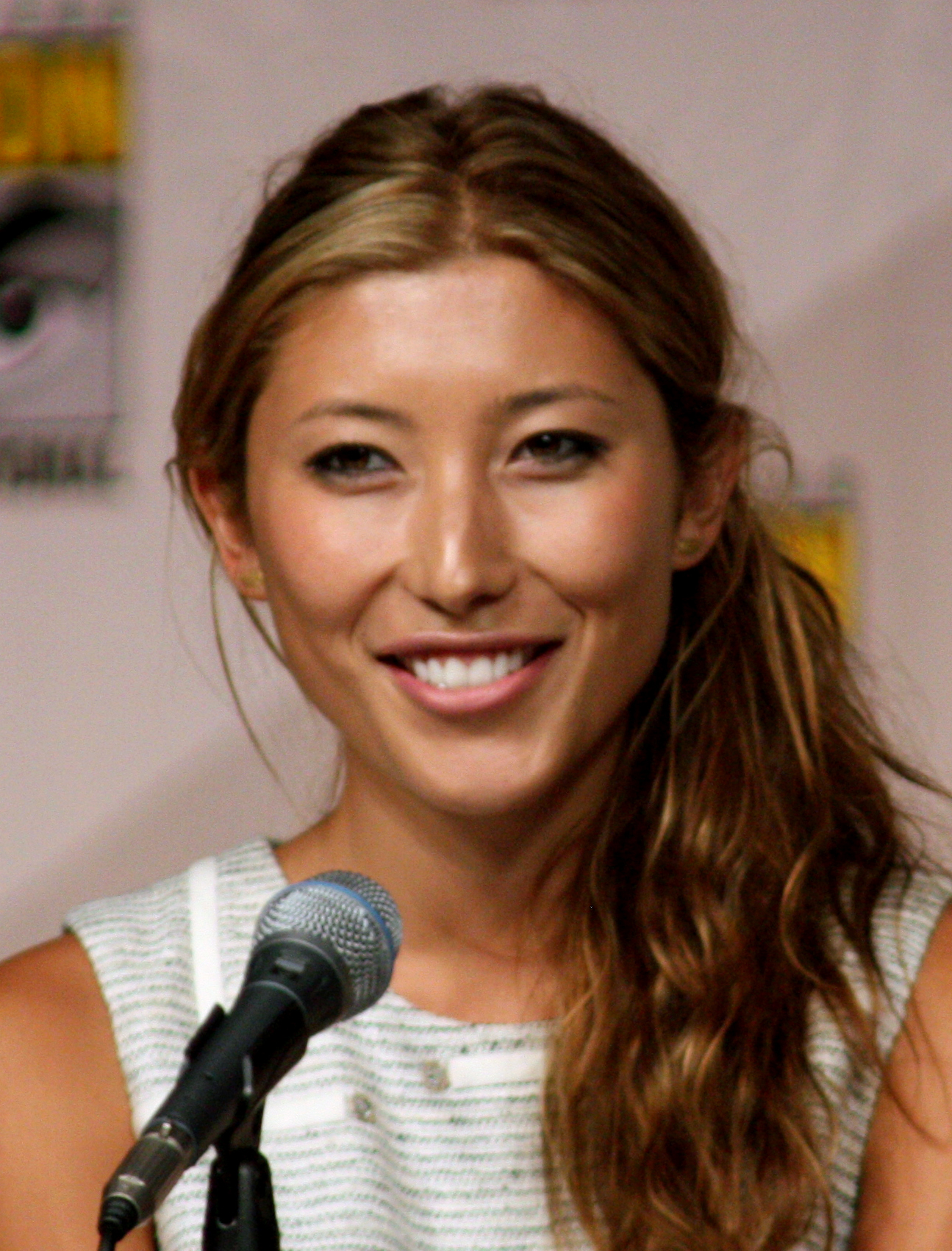
Dichen Lachman received critical acclaim for her performance in the episode.

"Chikhai Bardo" received widespread critical acclaim. Saloni Gajjar of The A.V. Club gave the episode an "A" and wrote, "Written by Erickson and Mark Friedman, episode seven pulls back the curtain on Mark and Gemma's life and unravels just how cruelly Lumon has been treating her for two years. It's what everyone's been waiting for. We don't have all the answers yet, but 'Chikhai Bardo' is a rewarding journey because of Severance's commitment to being character-driven."

Alan Sepinwall of Rolling Stone said, "was 'Chikhai Bardo' one of the great moments in the history of Severance? Not really, but only because episodes like 'Woe's Hollow' and the Season One finale set a very high bar. But it had a big, complicated job to tackle, and it did it in fascinating, unconventional fashion." He also praised Dichen Lachman's performance and her chemistry with Adam Scott. Ben Travers of IndieWire gave the episode a "B+" and wrote, "Practically speaking, I'm not sure what that would mean for Mark's Innie and Outie and their respective relationships. But for as much as ['Chikhai Bardo'] serves to remind us of Mark and Gemma's intimate, enduring connection, it also reminds us that they can't simply go back to what they had before. They have to move forward. Whether they can go there together, well, that's the million-dollar question."

Erin Qualey of Vulture hailed Jessica Lee Gagné's direction, writing that "Her ability to converse with the audience by using evocative lighting cues and clever framing is master-level". She praised Gagné for "delivering an arresting portrait of Mark meeting the cops at the door, the top half of his face completely obscured by shadow." Sean T. Collins of Decider wrote, "Believe it or not, but as best I can tell, this swirling, tumbling, brilliantly filmed and assembled episode marks the veteran cinematographer's directorial debut. From the flips and fades and segues and other weird tricks that mark scene transitions to the high-stakes performance she coaxes out of the actors, it's hard to imagine a more auspicious debut."

Brady Langman of Esquire wrote, "This is an exploration of memory, how we perceive time, and what lurks within the deepest corners of our psyche. More so than its quirky and unsettling rumination on this great cubicled life, Severance is a study of how we experience — and more often than not, repress — our darkest trauma, only to find joy again through sheer will. I'll say it: 'Chikhai Bardo' is a masterpiece." Erik Kain of Forbes wrote, "This was yet another deeply powerful episode, and perhaps the hardest one to watch so far. The cruelty inflicted upon Gemma is simply devastating. The tragedy of her and Mark's marriage is heartbreaking. I've watched the episode twice and each time I came away not just unsettled, but deeply moved and saddened."

Jeff Ewing of Collider wrote, "'Chikhai Bardo' is a stunner of an episode that provides our best look yet at Gemma, her relationship with pre-tragedy Mark, and what exactly is going on with her in Lumon's halls." Breeze Riley of Telltale TV gave the episode a 4.5 star rating out of 5 and wrote, "For as beautiful and affecting the episode is, it does raise some questions about what show Severance wants to be. It seems to have mostly abandoned Season 1's interest in being a commentary on capitalism and the workplace and fully adopted its identity as a character-driven sci-fi mystery."

=== Accolades ===
TVLine named Dichen Lachman as an honorable mention for the "Performer of the Week" for the week of March 1, 2025, for her performance in the episode. The website wrote: "We've been waiting to find out what's happening with Mark's wife Gemma on Severance, and this week's episode delivered, with a powerhouse performance from Dichen Lachman as Gemma."

Award	Year	Category	Recipient(s)	Result	Ref.
ACE Eddie Awards	2026	Best Edited Drama Series	Keith Fraase	Nominated	
Art Directors Guild Awards	2026	One-Hour Contemporary Single-Camera Series	Jeremy Hindle	Won	
Astra TV Awards	2025	Best Directing in a Drama Series	Jessica Lee Gagné	Nominated	
Creative Arts Emmy Awards	2025	Outstanding Picture Editing for a Drama Series	Keith Fraase	Nominated	
Creative Arts Emmy Awards	2025	Outstanding Production Design for a Narrative Contemporary Program (One Hour or More)	Jeremy Hindle, Chris Shriver, Ann Bartek, and David Schlesinger	Won	
Creative Arts Emmy Awards	2025	Outstanding Sound Editing for a Comedy or Drama Series (One Hour)	Jacob Ribicoff, Gregg Swiatlowski, Eric Strausser, Sam Zeines, Felipe Pacheco, Marko Costanzo, and Alex Wang	Nominated	
Primetime Emmy Awards	2025	Outstanding Directing for a Drama Series	Jessica Lee Gagné	Nominated	
