= Cold Harbor (Severance) =

- Severance episode
- The final shot of the episode, depicting Mark and Helly running through the Lumon halls.
- Episode no.: Season 2 Episode 10
- Directed by: Ben Stiller
- Written by: Dan Erickson
- Cinematography by: Jessica Lee Gagné
- Editing by: Geoffrey Richman
- Original release date: March 20, 2025 (Note: The episode was promoted with the global release date of March 21, but released in American time zones on the preceding evening.)
- Running time: 76 minutes

Guest appearances
- Merritt Wever as Gretchen George; Gwendoline Christie as Lorne; Sandra Bernhard as Nurse Cecily; Robby Benson as Dr. Mauer; Ólafur Darri Ólafsson as Mr. Drummond; Michael Siberry as Jame Eagan

Episode chronology
← Previous "The After Hours"	Next → —

"Cold Harbor" is the tenth episode and season finale of the second season of the American science fiction psychological thriller television series Severance. It is the 19th overall episode of the series, and was written by series creator Dan Erickson and directed by executive producer Ben Stiller. It was released on Apple TV+ on March 20, 2025.

The series follows employees of Lumon Industries, a biotechnology corporation that uses a medical procedure called "severance" to separate the memories of their employees: at work, Lumon employees, called "innies", can't remember anything outside of work. Outside work, Lumon employees, called "outies", can't remember anything about work. As a result, innies and outies experience two different lives, with distinct personalities and agendas. In the episode, Mark's outie and innie move forward with their plan to rescue his wife Gemma from Lumon.

Upon its release, "Cold Harbor" received acclaim for the performances (especially Adam Scott), direction, twists, tension, emotional weight, and closure to the season. The episode is considered as one of the best episodes of the series. (Note: Attributed to multiple references:) At the 77th Primetime Emmy Awards, Erickson and Stiller received a nomination for Outstanding Writing for a Drama Series and Outstanding Directing for a Drama Series, respectively, while Scott submitted the episode to support his nomination for Outstanding Lead Actor in a Drama Series.

== Plot ==
In the birthing cabin, Mark's outie and innie communicate with each other by recording messages with a camcorder and having Mark walk in and out of the severed room to respond.

Mark's outie, Devon, and Cobel explain the plan to rescue Gemma from the testing floor and use the evidence of her kidnapping to take down Lumon. Mark's innie argues that reintegration will result in him losing his identity and autonomy; he grows agitated when he realizes that since Helena would never reintegrate with her innie Helly, taking down Lumon would effectively mean ending Helly's life. Cobel reveals to Mark's innie that every MDR file he completes creates a new innie for Gemma, and that Cold Harbor is the last, after which Lumon will extract Gemma's chip from her brain, killing her in the process. When she insists that Mark is merely being used by the Eagans and has no future with Helly, Mark storms off, demanding to reawaken on the severed floor.

The next day, Dylan returns to find that his outie has deferred a decision on his resignation request to him, saying his existence makes him feel happy. Mark arrives on the severed floor and completes the Cold Harbor file with Helly by his side. Milchick and an animatronic statue of Kier Eagan congratulate Mark. During the congratulatory ovation to Mark S, Kier Egan's Animatronic starts to demoralize Milchick, going as far as calling him "Seth". Milchick performs with a marching band from the Choreography & Merriment department. Helly distracts Milchick and traps him in the bathroom while Mark searches for the elevator to the testing floor. Dylan arrives at MDR and helps Helly hold off Milchick by barricading the bathroom door with a vending machine.

Gemma enters the Cold Harbor room, where her new innie is tasked with disassembling the crib Mark had built for their baby. To the delight of Dr. Mauer and Jame Eagan, this does not trigger any emotions in her innie. Meanwhile, Lorne brings a goat to a secret room across from the exports hall, where Mr. Drummond is waiting; the goat, chosen for how well it embodies Kier's core principles, is a sacrifice that will be buried alongside Gemma. Drummond provides Lorne with a cattle stunner to kill the goat but is distracted by the sound of Mark attempting to break into the exports hall. Drummond tries to strangle Mark but is stopped by Lorne, who threatens him with the cattle stunner. They fight until Lorne subdues Drummond.

Holding Drummond hostage with the cattle stunner, Mark takes him to the elevator down to the testing floor; during the transition to his outie, Mark accidentally activates the cattle stunner, killing Drummond. Mark's outie locates the Cold Harbor room, uses his tie soaked in Drummond's blood to enter the room via biometric authentication and frees Gemma. Upon exiting the room, Gemma reverts to her outie and tearfully reunites with Mark. They escape back up to the severed floor, transitioning again to their severed identities. Mark's innie guides Ms. Casey to the exit stairwell where she transitions back to Gemma, but he decides not to join her, instead returning to Helly. Gemma cries for Mark as he and Helly run off into the hallways, holding hands.

== Production ==
=== Development ===
The episode was written by series creator Dan Erickson and directed by executive producer Ben Stiller. This marked Erickson's seventh writing credit and Stiller's 11th directing credit.

=== Writing ===
Erickson said that in an earlier version of the script that they would expand more about the content behind the "Cold Harbor" file. However, they decided to keep it unknown as the answer to its content will lead "into a bigger question of the company's ultimate agenda and that will remain unknown". Erickson also mentioned, "We talked about whether it was too early to reveal [it]. But I really felt that was [part] of such an intricate, bigger mystery that it felt like it was time [...] Let's give people an answer to this, because it then opens us up to these other bigger questions."

Stiller considered ending the final scene earlier, before Mark chose to run to Helly. Stiller stated that they chose not to end on a cliffhanger, explaining, "After having [a] cliffhanger ending in Season 1, I didn't want to do that to the audience. It always felt this was the natural way that Mark's innie would go." Britt Lower offered her interpretation of the ending, saying, "It's the cocktail of emotions. They've made this decision [...] It felt like we were a couple of wild horses who were just let loose."

Erickson explained Mark's decision to stay and leave Gemma, stating, "It's a painful realization for him in that moment [...] the only person that he [loves] is standing behind him and so that's ultimately the direction that he goes. It's a choice between two loves, but it's also a choice between two identities [...] It's him saying [he] is [as] valid and is as important as [his outie]." Adam Scott added, "It just seemed like the logical place to go [...] But as far as ending the season before he makes a choice, I'm so glad we didn't end up doing that. I think that the season ends in the exact right place."

=== Music ===
Stiller said that for the final scene he was "looking for the juxtaposition of the craziness of that with a hopeful song". The crew considered using "I Got You Babe" by Sonny & Cher or "As Tears Go By" by Nancy Sinatra, but they considered the former "too cute" and the latter "didn't make as much thematic sense". They eventually chose "The Windmills of Your Mind" by Mel Tormé, with Stiller arguing "is weird both with its lyrics and sound. It's like a crazy drug trip. That's what this whole show is about." Stiller also felt that using "Work Song" by Bobby Darin for the credits was a strange choice, but concluded that they "fit together".

== Critical reception ==
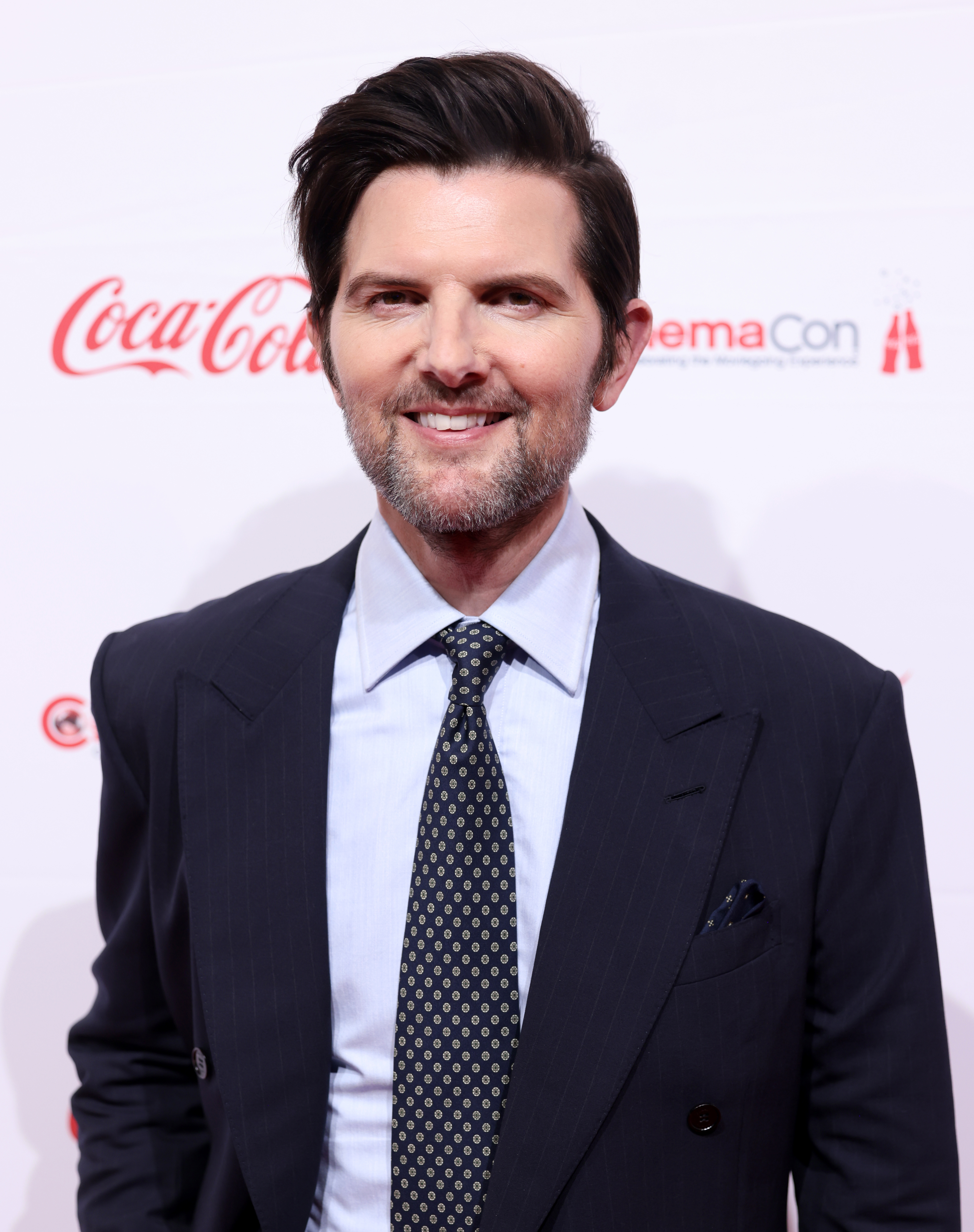
Adam Scott's performance garnered critical acclaim, earning an Emmy nomination for Outstanding Lead Actor in a Drama Series.

"Cold Harbor" received widespread critical acclaim. On the review aggregator website Rotten Tomatoes, the episode received an approval rating of 100%, based on 15 reviews, with an average rating of 9.7/10.

Saloni Gajjar of The A.V. Club gave the episode an "A–" and wrote, "The broader suspense has suffered [and] this might leave viewers understandably conflicted and lacking in patience about the show's pace, especially with how everything culminates in 'Cold Harbor'. If you see the season finale as a character study, though, it's a potent, absurd, and stunning one."

Alan Sepinwall of Rolling Stone wrote, "Season Two didn't always help itself [by] devoting entire installments to 'Cold Harbor' and to the origin of the severance process itself. But it ended in a place that leans into the best and most important parts of the series, and that reckons with its core ideas in exciting, surprising, funny, and moving ways." Ben Travers of IndieWire gave the episode an "A" and wrote, "People don't typically respond to reason in the same way they respond to feelings, and 'Cold Harbor' evokes a bevy of conflicting feelings."

Erin Qualey of Vulture gave the episode a perfect 5 star rating out of 5 and wrote, "'Cold Harbor' is a captivating hour-plus of television that serves up several palpable gut punches, some cryptic Lumon lore, and a handful of the most visually stunning sequences the show has ever put onscreen." Sean T. Collins of Decider wrote, "Whether you watched for the plot or the emotions or the themes or the performances or the visuals or the overall tone, you got something good. Good is good!"

Brady Langman of Esquire wrote, "I don't think any of us expected Severance to deliver a cliffhanger on the level of its season 1 finale. But here we are. This is the story of what it means to become whole again. And what life looks like when you confront the worst parts of yourself and choose to follow what—and who—you love, even if it means spending another day in hell." Erik Kain of Forbes wrote, "This was a powerful, shocking, perfectly crafted episode of television, though I still think the Season 1 finale, however less bombastic and wild, hit me a little bit harder. Of course, it's almost impossible to top such a pivotal episode, but Stiller and his team have come close."

Jeff Ewing of Collider gave the episode a perfect 10 out of 10 and wrote, "We still don't know what Cobel's ultimate intentions are [and] Mark and Helly aren't safe [at] Lumon. For now, [they] get a happy ending, and Gemma's free—even if she's really, really unhappy about it." Breeze Riley of Tell-Tale TV gave the episode a 4.5 star rating out of 5 and, regarding its climax, wrote, "You can't say the show made the boring choice. [Its] conflict was never just against Lumon but also these independent beings they created when they signed themselves up for severance."

=== Accolades ===
TVLine named Adam Scott as "Performer of the Week" for the week of March 22, 2025, for his performance in the episode, writing, "The episode's final moments served as one last flourish for Scott, with him silently conveying innie Mark's confusion and ultimate commitment to Helly. He dove deep into genuine emotion and helped make the Severance finale one we'll be talking about and debating for years to come."

Award	Category	Recipient(s)	Result	Ref.
ACE Eddie Awards	Best Edited Drama Series	Geoffrey Richman	Nominated	
Astra TV Awards	Best Directing in a Drama Series	Ben Stiller	Nominated	
Astra TV Awards	Best Writing in a Drama Series	Dan Erickson	Nominated	
Cinema Audio Society Awards	Outstanding Achievement in Sound Mixing for a Television Series – One Hour	David Schwartz, Bob Chefalas, Jacob Ribicoff, Chris Fogel, Kris Chevannes, and George Lara	Nominated	
Directors Guild of America Awards	Outstanding Directorial Achievement in Dramatic Series	Ben Stiller	Nominated	
Golden Reel Awards	Outstanding Achievement in Music Editing – Broadcast Long Form	Lena Glikson and Scott Hanau	Nominated	
Golden Reel Awards	Outstanding Achievement in Sound Editing – Broadcast Long Form Dialogue / ADR	Jacob Ribicoff and Gregg Swiatlowski	Nominated	
Hugo Awards	Best Dramatic Presentation – Short Form	Dan Erickson and Ben Stiller	Nominated	
Primetime Emmy Awards	Outstanding Directing for a Drama Series	Ben Stiller	Nominated	
Primetime Emmy Awards	Outstanding Writing for a Drama Series	Dan Erickson	Nominated	
Primetime Creative Arts Emmy Awards	Outstanding Guest Actress in a Drama Series	Gwendoline Christie	Nominated	
Primetime Creative Arts Emmy Awards	Outstanding Music Composition for a Series (Original Dramatic Score)	Theodore Shapiro	Won	
Primetime Creative Arts Emmy Awards	Outstanding Music Supervision	George Drakoulias	Nominated	
Primetime Creative Arts Emmy Awards	Outstanding Picture Editing for a Drama Series	Geoffrey Richman	Nominated	
Primetime Creative Arts Emmy Awards	Outstanding Sound Mixing for a Comedy or Drama Series (One Hour)	Bob Chefalas, Jacob Ribicoff, David Schwartz, and George Lara	Won	
Primetime Creative Arts Emmy Awards	Outstanding Stunt Performance	Justice Hedenberg, Katie Rowe, and Erik Martin	Nominated	
