= The We We Are =

- Severance episode
- Helly just before making her speech.
- Episode no.: Season 1 Episode 9
- Directed by: Ben Stiller
- Written by: Dan Erickson
- Cinematography by: Jessica Lee Gagné
- Editing by: Geoffrey Richman
- Original release date: April 8, 2022
- Running time: 40 minutes

Guest appearances
- Sydney Cole Alexander as Natalie; Nora Dale as Gabby Arteta; Michael Siberry as Jame Eagan; Dan Erickson as party guest (uncredited)

Episode chronology
← Previous "What's for Dinner?"	Next → "Hello, Ms. Cobel"

"The We We Are" is the ninth episode and first season finale of the American science fiction psychological thriller television series Severance. The episode was written by series creator Dan Erickson, and directed by executive producer Ben Stiller. It was released on Apple TV+ on April 8, 2022.

The series follows employees of Lumon Industries, a biotechnology corporation that uses a medical procedure called "severance" to separate the memories of their employees: at work, Lumon employees, called "innies", can't remember anything outside of work. Outside work, Lumon employees, called "outies", can't remember anything about work. As a result, innies and outies experience two different lives, with distinct personalities and agendas. In the episode, Dylan activates the overtime contingency, allowing Mark, Irving and Helly to wake up in the outside world as their innies.

The episode received universal acclaim for its writing, performances, directing, score, tension, reveals and the cliffhanger ending. Stiller and Erickson received nominations for Outstanding Directing for a Drama Series and Outstanding Writing for a Drama Series at the 74th Primetime Emmy Awards.

== Plot ==
The innies wake up in the outside world. Mark (Adam Scott) wakes up while hugging Cobel (Patricia Arquette) at Ricken's book-reading party. He soon learns that he has a sister present. Irving (John Turturro) awakens to find himself painting alone at his apartment. Helly (Britt Lower) finds herself at a gala, meeting Natalie (Sydney Cole Alexander) and Gabby Arteta (Nora Dale). She is horrified to learn that her outie is in fact Helena Eagan, heir of Lumon's founding family. Back inside the severed floor's security room, Dylan (Zach Cherry) contorts himself to hold down the two switches enabling the overtime contingency.

Mark meets Devon (Jen Tullock) for the first time and attempts to hold a private conversation with her to divulge his situation, but they experience several interruptions. Mark is stunned to learn that Ricken (Michael Chernus) is his brother-in-law, and that he is hosting a reading of the very book Mark has been secretly reading at work. During a break, Mark learns from Ricken that he underwent the severance process after losing his wife Gemma (Dichen Lachman). Mark tells Ricken the book changed his life. A suspicious Cobel presses Mark on the major life change his outie told her about; Mark excuses himself from the conversation but addresses her as "Ms. Cobel," alerting her that the overtime contingency has been activated. Elsewhere, Irving finds a chest with effects from his father's time in the Navy. Hidden in a secret compartment, he discovers that his outie has been gathering information on a long list of severed Lumon employees, including Burt (Christopher Walken), whose house is marked on a map. Irving drives to Burt's house.

At the gala, Helly finds that her outie underwent the severance procedure as a PR stunt to help build public support for legalizing it. She finds a large photo display full of seemingly happy moments between her and the MDR team—captured on camera by Milchick—and learns that she is scheduled to be the keynote speaker at the gala. She comports herself in the bathroom, only to be met by her father Jame (Michael Siberry), Lumon's current CEO, who thanks her for agreeing to become severed. Jame reveals that Lumon intends to sever the entire human population.

Mark is finally able to talk with Devon privately, explaining that he is in his innie form. He asks why his outie would take part in the severance program, and she reiterates it was Gemma's death. Mark wants her to contact the authorities to stop Lumon, but Devon warns that Lumon likely controls the police, and that they should go to a journalist instead. Mark reveals to her that "Mrs. Selvig" is his boss; a horrified Devon realizes she left her baby with her, and that Cobel has left the party.

Cobel races to Lumon, calling Milchick (Tramell Tillman) to inform him that the overtime contingency has been activated. Milchick rushes to the security room but finds Dylan has tied the door shut from the inside with his belt, and Milchick begins to cut through it. Irving locates Burt in his house but is heartbroken to find that he is with another man; still, he leaves his car to bang on the front door, yelling Burt's name. Cobel arrives at the Lumon gala just before Helly is to speak and threatens her, but she is unable to stop Helly from going on stage. Before the gala, Helly reveals herself to the crowd as her innie, decrying the severance process as a torturous experience before she is tackled by Natalie. After a frantic search, Devon's baby is located unharmed; Mark, meanwhile, discovers a picture of his wedding day, recognizing Gemma as Ms. Casey, and rushes to Devon shouting, "She's alive!" Milchick finally breaks into the security room and tackles Dylan, immediately stopping the overtime contingency.

== Development ==
=== Production ===
The episode was written by series creator Dan Erickson, and directed by executive producer Ben Stiller. This marked Erickson's third writing credit, and Stiller's sixth directing credit.

=== Writing ===
On Helly's character arc, Britt Lower said, "For me it was a real pleasure to envision Helly's arc. I'm a visual artist, so I drew out all of the action sequences that Helly goes through and put them on my wall, and it almost looks like a graphic novel. I mean, Helly is so dynamic. She's constantly moving, so being able to look at that wall and pinpoint where we were in the filming process was super helpful." Regarding her speech on stage, Lower explained, "For me, it was a moment of her reckoning with herself and taking responsibility. I think that's the moment when she realizes she's connected, whether she likes it or not, to the behaviors of herself on the outside. She takes matters into her own hands. If it's effective, I don't know, we'll have to see. Helly is not one to not move forward when she's made a decision."

Erickson and Stiller considered different ways to end the episode, with Stiller suggesting that the end of the overtime contingency should be the last scene. While Erickson felt viewers would be upset, he deemed it "by far the most effective point where we could have ended this part of the story, storytelling-wise and for the characters." Stiller added, "Originally, we were going to go further and answer more questions, but I felt really strongly that there's something about the mystery of the show that you want to live in. It is that balance of answering enough questions, but not too many. We settled on this because, in a way, it was the most emotionally resonant idea."

=== Filming ===
Stiller considered filming the episode in one shot, but scrapped the idea because the structure would prove impossible to achieve it. He said, "I knew from the very first shot of the episode on Mark that we wanted to keep it as continuous as possible. It almost felt like the camera was attached to the front of [the actor's] face."

== Critical reception ==
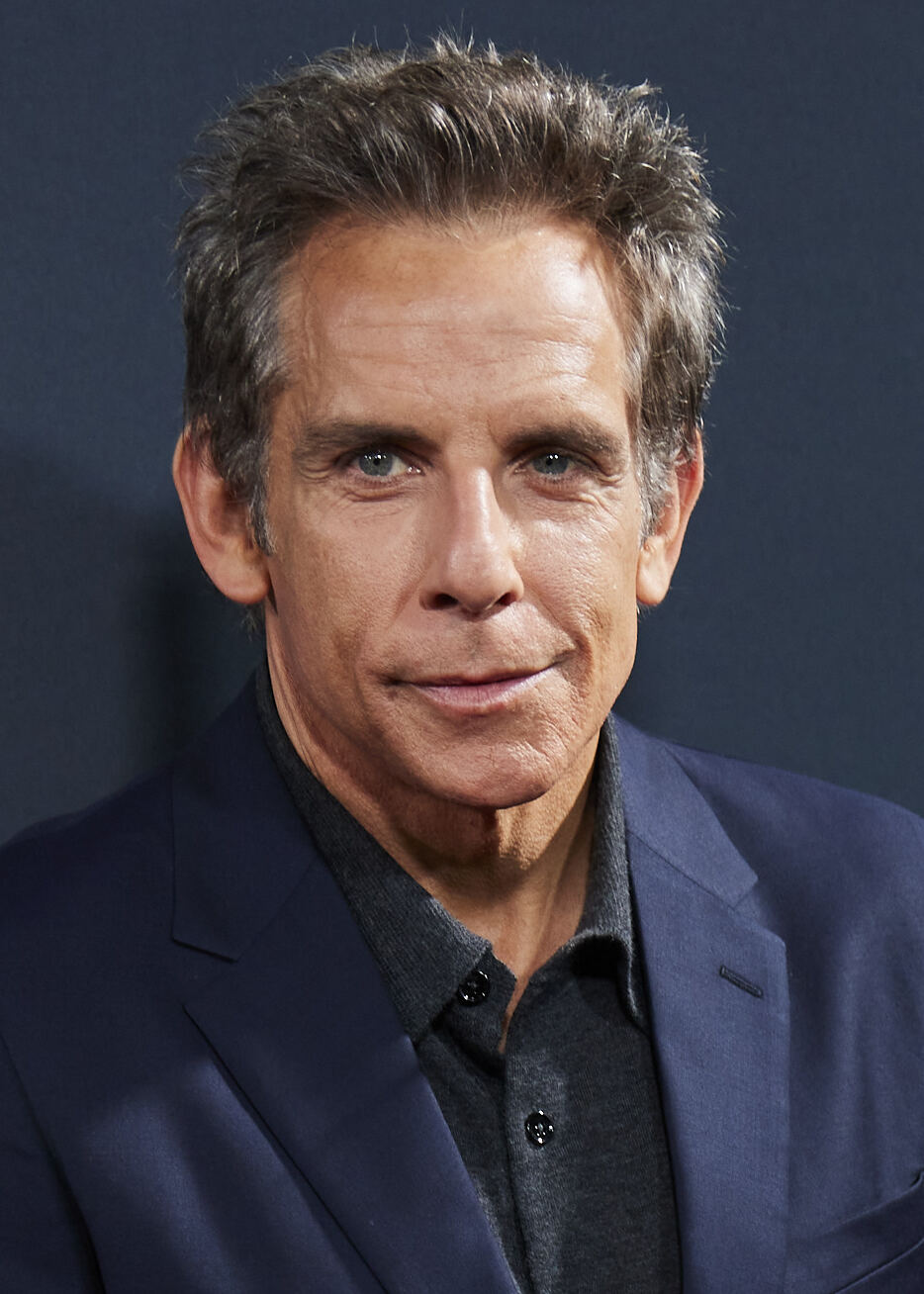
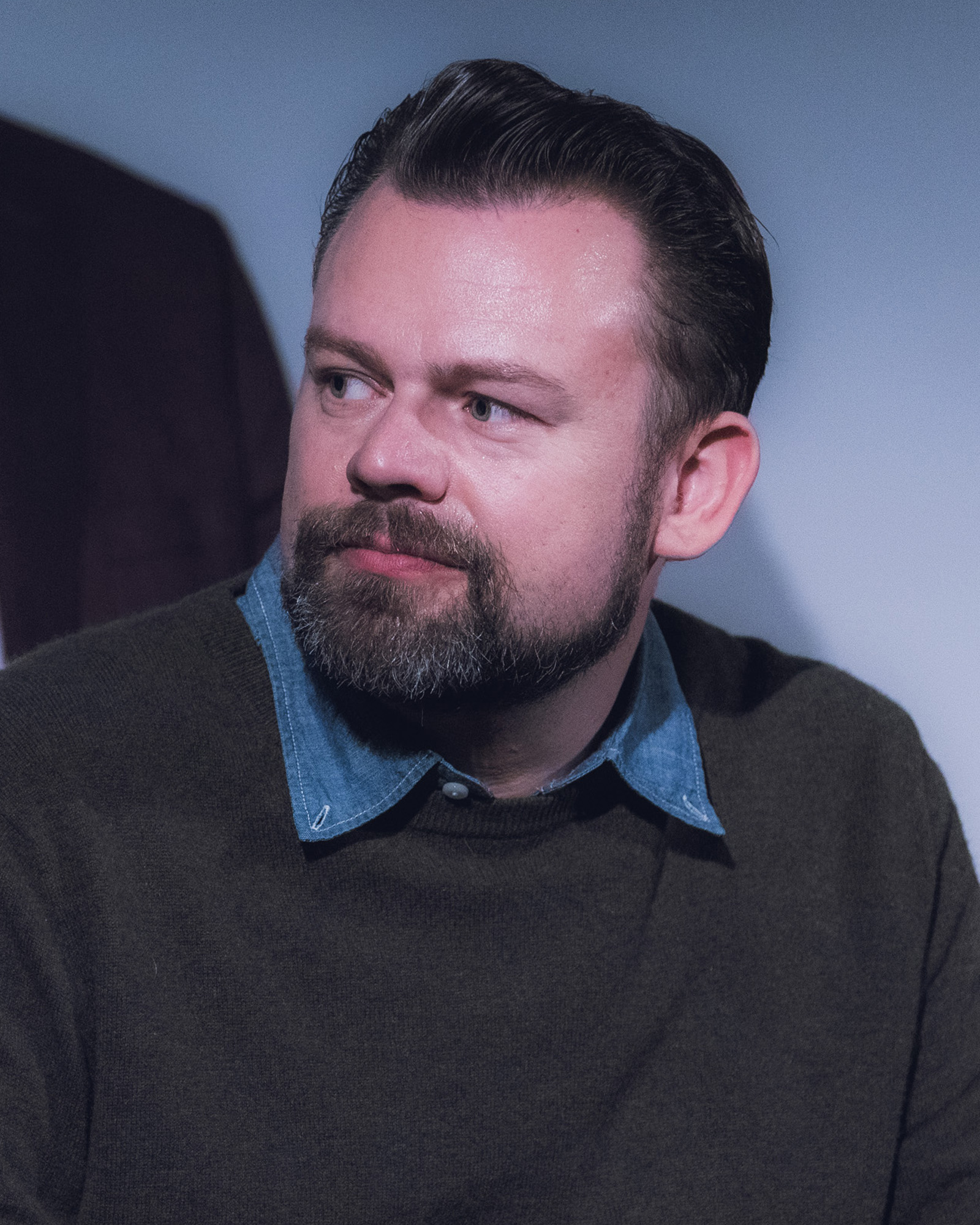
For the episode, Ben Stiller and Dan Erickson received nominations at the 74th Primetime Emmy Awards.

"The We We Are" received universal acclaim, with reviewers praising Stiller's direction, Erickson's script, and the episode's performances, tension, and cliffhanger ending. Saloni Gajjar of The A.V. Club gave the episode an "A" and wrote, "'The We We Are' is a rush of pure adrenaline interspersed with moments of angst and dark humor. Dan Erickson and Ben Stiller's writer-director combination works wonders here. This is a satisfying finale because it sprinkles answers throughout at a digestible pace. And then bam: Those last 10 minutes don't hold back."

Erin Qualey of Vulture gave the episode five out of five, and wrote, "I understand if there's viewer frustration over the lack of answers in this finale episode. Personally? I'm going to love thinking about this show for months to come. For me, the best shows are the ones that tease my brain with possibility. Given how stellar the first season was, I fully trust the Severance creative team will capably steer this ship, and I will follow wherever they lead." Oliver VanDervoort of Game Rant wrote, "In what is a master class in how to really dial ratchet up the drama in the final moments of the season finale, the episode ends with all three Innies trying one desperate act as they appear to feel their time is almost up. However, Severance also handles this well because it's not a plot hole that they seem to know things are coming to an end, it's much more about getting the information out there they know is important. Now it's going to be a long wait until Season 2."

Myles McNutt of Episodic Medium wrote, "Skeptical as I am of the 7-hour pilot, though, I left the first season of Severance feeling like this is the best possible execution of it, and the limitations placed on 'The We We Are' nonetheless create something that lifts the stories that came before it." Breeze Riley of Telltale TV gave the episode five out of five, and wrote, "Despite these loose ends, there is still satisfaction in seeing the innies' breakthrough. It diminishes the frustration you might usually feel about a cliffhanger ending."

Mary Littlejohn of TV Fanatic gave the episode four and a half out of five, and wrote, "Though it may not feel like it, Severance Season 1 Episode 9 was the most satisfying episode so far." Caemeron Crain of TV Obsessive wrote, "Severance Season 2 is reportedly in production, so hopefully we won't have to wait too terribly long for this story to continue. In the meantime, I suggest contemplating Lumon's nine core values and studying the Eagan family line."

=== Awards and accolades ===
TVLine named Britt Lower as an honorable mention for the "Performer of the Week" for the week of April 9, 2022, for her performance in the episode. The site wrote, "Apple TV+'s dystopian workplace thriller Severance just blew our minds with a roller coaster of a season finale, and it wouldn't have worked without Britt Lower's fiery, complex work as Helly. Always the most rebellious of the Lumon employees, Helly discovered that in the outside world, she's actually the CEO's daughter and the heir to Lumon's family legacy. Lower played the stunning reveal with remarkable precision, with Helly slowly putting together the pieces while not betraying the truth to her corporate peers. When Helly uncorked the truth about Lumon's severance procedure in a torrent of rage, Lower finally let a season's worth of frustration and despair come spilling out to the surface. We can't wait to see what Season 2 has in store for us, especially with Lower uncovering new layers to Helly like this."

Ben Stiller and Dan Erickson received nominations for Outstanding Directing for a Drama Series and Outstanding Writing for a Drama Series at the 74th Primetime Emmy Awards, respectively. Stiller would lose to Hwang Dong-hyuk for the episode "Red Light, Green Light" in Squid Game, while Erickson would lose to Jesse Armstrong for the episode "All the Bells Say" in Succession.
