= 75th Directors Guild of America Awards =

- Date: February 18, 2023
- Location: The Beverly Hilton, Beverly Hills, California
- Country: United States
- Presented by: Directors Guild of America
- Hosted by: Judd Apatow

Highlights
- Best Director Feature Film: Everything Everywhere All at Once – Daniel Kwan and Daniel Scheinert
- Best Director Documentary: Fire of Love – Sara Dosa
- Best Director First-Time Feature Film: Aftersun – Charlotte Wells

The 75th Directors Guild of America Awards, honoring the outstanding directorial achievement in feature films, documentary, television and commercials of 2022, were presented on February 18, 2023, at the Beverly Hilton in Beverly Hills, California. The ceremony was hosted by Judd Apatow, who previously hosted the ceremonies in 2018, 2020 and 2022. The nominations for the television and documentary categories were announced on January 10, 2023, while the nominations for the feature film categories were announced on January 11, 2023.

== Winners and nominees ==
=== Film ===
Feature Film

Daniel Kwan and Daniel Scheinert – Everything Everywhere All at Once

- Todd Field – Tár
- Joseph Kosinski – Top Gun: Maverick
- Martin McDonagh – The Banshees of Inisherin
- Steven Spielberg – The Fabelmans
Documentaries

Sara Dosa – Fire of Love

- Matthew Heineman – Retrograde
- Laura Poitras – All the Beauty and the Bloodshed
- Daniel Roher – Navalny
- Shaunak Sen – All That Breathes
First-Time Feature Film

Charlotte Wells – Aftersun

- Alice Diop – Saint Omer
- Audrey Diwan – Happening
- John Patton Ford – Emily the Criminal
- Antoneta Alamat Kusijanović – Murina

=== Television ===
Drama Series

Sam Levinson – Euphoria for "Stand Still Like the Hummingbird" (HBO)

- Jason Bateman – Ozark for "A Hard Way To Go" (Netflix)
- Vince Gilligan – Better Call Saul for "Waterworks" (AMC)
- Aoife McArdle – Severance for "Hide and Seek" (Apple TV+)
- Ben Stiller – Severance for "The We We Are" (Apple TV+)
Comedy Series

Bill Hader – Barry for "710N" (HBO)

- Tim Burton – Wednesday for "Wednesday's Child is Full of Woe" (Netflix)
- Amy Sherman-Palladino – The Marvelous Mrs. Maisel for "How Do You Get to Carnegie Hall?" (Prime Video)
- Christopher Storer – The Bear for "Review" (FX on Hulu)
- Mike White – The White Lotus for "Arrivederci" (HBO)
Movies for Television and Limited Series

Helen Shaver – Station Eleven for "Who's There?" (HBO Max)

- Eric Appel – Weird: The Al Yankovic Story (The Roku Channel)
- Deborah Chow – Obi-Wan Kenobi (Disney+)
- Jeremy Podeswa – Station Eleven for "Unbroken Circle" (HBO Max)
- Tom Verica – Inventing Anna for "The Devil Wore Anna" (Netflix)
Variety/Talk/News/Sports – Regularly Scheduled Programming

Liz Patrick – Saturday Night Live for "Jack Harlow" (NBC)

- Paul G. Casey – Real Time with Bill Maher for "#2010" (HBO)
- Jim Hoskinson – The Late Show with Stephen Colbert for "#1333" (CBS)
- David Paul Meyer – The Daily Show with Trevor Noah for "Brandi Carlile Discusses Her New Deluxe Album and Performs 'You and Me on the Rock'" (Comedy Central)
- Paul Pennolino – Last Week Tonight with John Oliver for "Afghanistan" (HBO)
Variety/Talk/News/Sports – Specials

Glenn Weiss – The 75th Annual Tony Awards (CBS)

- Ian Berger – The Daily Show with Trevor Noah Presents "Jordan Klepper Fingers the Pulse – Hungary for Democracy" (Comedy Central)
- Hamish Hamilton – Super Bowl LVI halftime show (NBC)
- James Merryman – Norman Lear: 100 Years of Music and Laughter (ABC)
- Marcus Raboy – Mark Twain Prize 2022: Celebrating Jon Stewart (PBS)
Reality Programs

Ben Simms – Running Wild with Bear Grylls for "Florence Pugh in the Volcanic Rainforests of Costa Rica" (Nat Geo)

- Joseph Guidry – The Big Brunch for "Carb Loading Brunch" (HBO Max)
- Carrie Havel – The Go-Big Show for "Only One Can Win" (TBS)
- Rich Kim – Lego Masters for "Jurass-brick World" (Fox)
- Michael Shea – FBOY Island for "Do You Like Cats?" (HBO Max)
Children's Programs

Anne Renton – Best Foot Forward for "Halloween" (Apple TV+)

- Tim Federle – Better Nate Than Ever (Disney+)
- Bonnie Hunt – Amber Brown for "I, Amber Brown" (Apple TV+)
- Dean Israelite – Are You Afraid of the Dark? for "The Tale of Room 13" (Nickelodeon)
- Michael Lembeck – Snow Day (Nickelodeon)

=== Commercials ===
Commercials

Kim Gehrig – Apple's "Accessibility" and "Run Baby Run"

- Juan Cabral – John Lewis & Partners' "For All Life's Moments" and Apple's "Share the Joy"
- Craig Gillespie – Apple's "Hard Knocks", Jimmy John's' "Problem", and Nissan's "Thrill Driver"
- David Shane – Apple's "Detectives", ITVX's "Smile", and Procter & Gamble's "Traffic Stop"
- Ivan Zachariáš – Apple's "Data Auction" and Upwork's "This Is How We Work Now"

=== Lifetime Achievement in Television ===
- Robert A. Fishman

=== Frank Capra Achievement Award ===
- Mark Hansson

=== Franklin J. Schaffner Achievement Award ===
- Valdez Flagg
