= Harmony Cobel =

Severance character

- Severance character
- First appearance: "Good News About Hell" (2022)
- Created by: Dan Erickson
- Portrayed by: Patricia Arquette

In-universe information
- Alias: Mrs. Selvig
- Occupation: Floor manager
- Affiliation: Lumon Industries
- Relatives: Charlotte Cobel (mother); Celestine Cobel (aunt)
- Origin: Salt's Neck, PE, United States
- Nationality: American
- Home: Kier, PE, United States

Harmony Cobel is a fictional character portrayed by Patricia Arquette in the Apple TV+ series Severance. Severance follows employees at the biotechnology corporation Lumon Industries that have undergone "severance"—a medical procedure that ensures they retain no memories of the outside world while at work and have no recollection of their job once they leave the company premises. This results in two distinct personalities for each employee: the "innie", who exists solely within Lumon, and the "outie", who lives their personal life outside of work.

Harmony Cobel is one of the series' major antagonists. Introduced as manager of the severed floor, Cobel is depicted as a strict Lumon loyalist who maintains a second identity outside of work to observe her employees' "outies", particularly Mark Scout, whom she neighbors. During the events of season one, she is fired from her position though apparently remains loyal to the company. Toward the end of season two, Cobel returns and allies with Mark following revelations about her history with Lumon.

Patricia Arquette's portrayal of Cobel has attracted widespread praise, and has earned her two Emmy Award nominations for Outstanding Supporting Actress in a Drama Series.

== Overview ==
Harmony Cobel grew up in Salt's Neck, a small town north of Kier, the city where the series is set. She worked as a child laborer in Lumon's ether factory there, before attending a boarding school and earning a scholarship with Lumon. (Note: As depicted in "Sweet Vitriol".) During this time, she invented the "severance" procedure, though credit was taken by the company's CEO, Jame Eagan.

As the series begins, she has worked her way up to become manager of the "severed floor", which hosts several teams of people working on mysterious tasks. She is cold and direct with her employees, including her second-in-command, Seth Milchick. Cobel maintained a secondary identity outside of Lumon, "Mrs. Selvig", with which she posed as a lactation consultant and nanny. She used this identity to observe Mark's "outie", particularly interested in his long-term mental state. When Helly R. attempts to kill herself, (Note: As depicted in "The You You Are".) Cobel is summarily dismissed from her position, and responds by destroying her shrine to Lumon founder Kier Eagan. She remains apparently loyal to the company, later attempting to prevent Helly from revealing the truth of the "innies" treatment by Lumon. (Note: As depicted in "The We We Are".)

In "Sweet Vitriol", after Cobel's role in inventing the severance procedure is revealed, she allies with Mark and helps him to reunite with his wife, Gemma Scout, who is being held by Lumon.

== Development ==
Harmony Cobel was conceived as a figure whose professional authority at Lumon contrasts with her identity as Mrs. Selvig, the neighbor of Mark Scout. Early interviews explained that the role was intended to highlight the show's themes of surveillance and blurred boundaries between work and personal life. Commentators noted that the character's commitment to Lumon is depicted as ideological, with the "Selvig" persona used to monitor and influence Mark outside the office environment.

In the second season, the episode "Sweet Vitriol" depicts Cobel's return to her hometown and expands on her association with Lumon. Critics wrote that the episode provided new context for the character's past and explained elements of her interest in other figures in the series.

Patricia Arquette was approached by Ben Stiller for the role, with whom she co-starred in Flirting with Disaster and later worked with on 2018 miniseries Escape at Dannemora. Arquette said she had "so many questions" about Cobel's motives and approach when first reading the scripts, and worked with creator Dan Erickson and director Ben Stiller to establish a consistent performance between Cobel's position at Lumon and her interactions as the neighbor Mrs. Selvig. In interviews, Arquette described Cobel as a character whose ties to Lumon were rooted in her "family and religion", which informed the contrast between her professional role and the behavior she adopts as Selvig. To prepare, Arquette researched what she called "cults and armies and different structures where they give you a little, and then take away a bunch."

== Reception ==
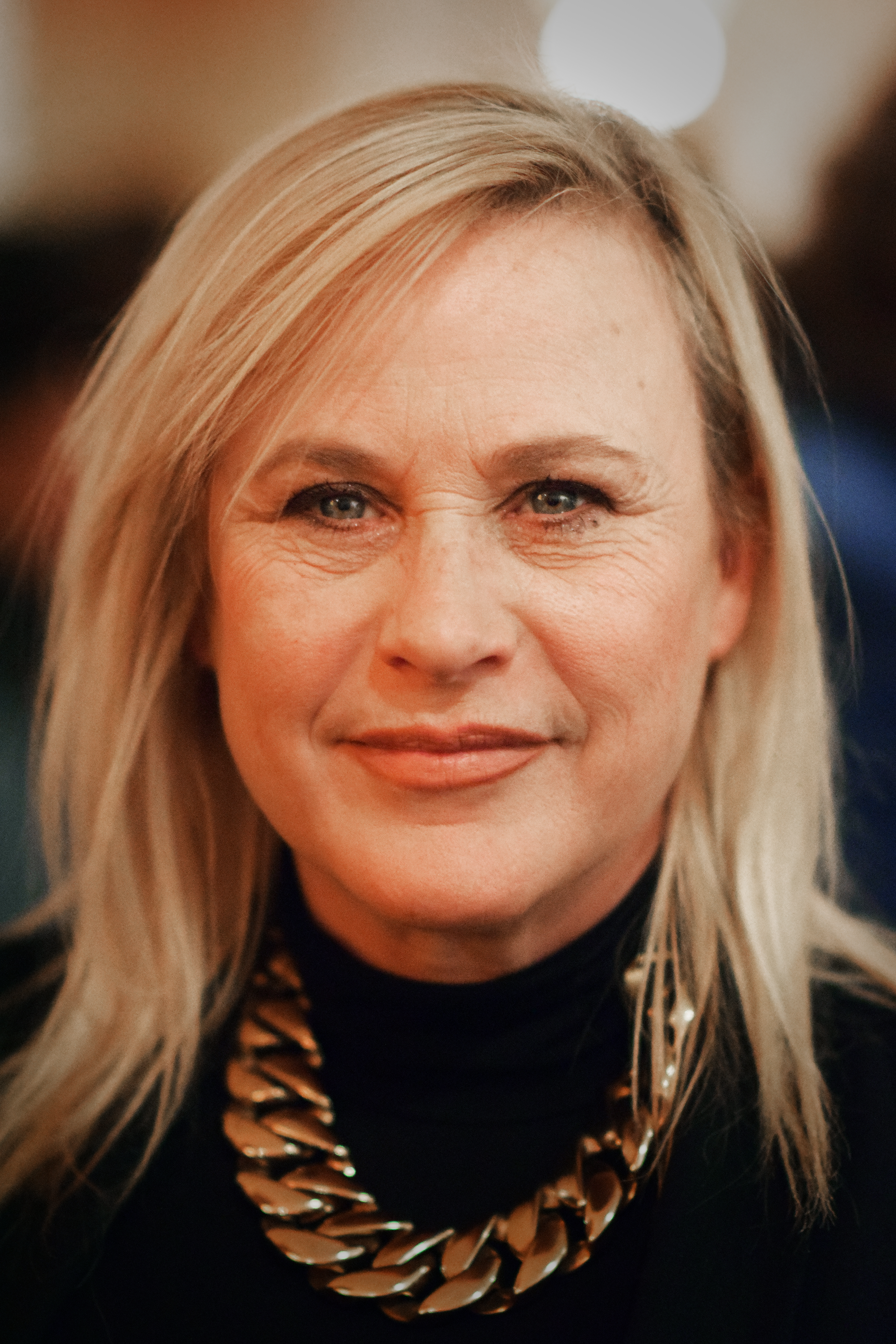
Patricia Arquette received acclaim for her portrayal of Cobel.

Writing for Vogue, Radhika Seth called Cobel "the most intensely terrifying presence in [Severance]." Kendall Myers of Collider wrote that, "there was always the mysterious Board and the Eagans, who ranked higher than her, but those were faceless enemies, and Cobel was right there, running the severed floor and enforcing the oppressive rules." Commentary on the series has emphasized Cobel's dual role as both a Lumon supervisor and an outside observer of Mark Scout, presenting her as an extension of the show's themes of surveillance and control.

Reviews of "Sweet Vitriol" highlighted the additional detail about Cobel's history and motives, though some critics disliked the episode. The A.V. Club's Saloni Gajjar wrote that "to abruptly halt the action for a Harmony backstory now is jarring and, frankly, a little boring."

Arquette's portrayal of Cobel has been a frequent subject in coverage of Severance. In discussing the second season, she stated that Cobel experiences a "dawning... about the dangerousness of Lumon," which some outlets identified as a significant development in the character's trajectory. Following the second season finale, Business Insider wrote that Cobel's connections to Mark and Gemma could become a further focus in the announced third season.

For her portrayal of Cobel, Arquette was nominated for the 2022 and 2025 Emmy Award for Outstanding Supporting Actress in a Drama Series. She won the Critics' Choice Super Award for Best Actress in a Science Fiction/Fantasy Series in 2023.
