= Aoife McArdle =

Irish writer, director, and cinematographer

Aoife McArdle (/ˈiːfə/ EE-fə) is an Irish writer and director working across film, television drama, music videos and commercials.

== Early life ==
Aoife McArdle grew up in Omagh, Northern Ireland.

She studied English Literature at Trinity College, Dublin where, alongside creative writing, she developed an interest in photography and cinematography, shooting and editing films on Super 8 and Mini DV. She went on to complete a master's degree in Film & TV production at Bournemouth film school. She began her film and music video career upon moving to London in 2005.

== Career ==
McArdle began her career directing short films and music videos, working with artists including Bloc Party, Jon Hopkins, Bryan Ferry, Coldplay, Bicep, U2 and Anna Calvi.

Her debut feature-length film, Kissing Candice, premiered at the Toronto International Film Festival in September 2017 and later screened at Berlin International Film Festival.

From 2020 to 2022, she was a director and producer on the Apple TV + series Severance which received multiple major awards and nominations including a Peabody Award.

In 2021, she directed All of This Unreal Time, a short film and immersive installation that premiered at the Manchester International Festival.

McArdle has also directed advertising campaigns for brands including Nike, Audi, Toyota, Squarespace and Apple. Her work in advertising has promoted social equality.

She has received an IFTA Rising Star Award, a WFTV Best Director Award as well as Directors Guild of America and Primetime Emmy nominations for her work.

== Filmography ==
=== Feature films ===
- Kissing Candice - Irish Film Board - 2018
- Foxfinder - TBA

=== Television ===
- Severance - Apple - 2022
- Brave New World - Peacock - 2020

=== Short films (selected) ===
- All of this Unreal Time - Manchester International Festival - 2021
- Italy, Texas - Vice/55DSL - 2013

=== Music videos ===
- "Water" (ft. Clara La San) - Bicep - 2022
- "Trouble in Town" - Coldplay - 2020
- "Every Breaking Wave" - U2 - 2015
- "Loop De Li" - Bryan Ferry - 2014
- "Half-Light" - Wilkinson - 2014
- "Open Eye Signal" - Jon Hopkins - 2013
- "Red Dust" - James Vincent McMorrow - 2013
- "Glacier" - James Vincent McMorrow - 2013
- "Cavalier" - James Vincent McMorrow - 2013
- "Lesson Number Seven" - Clock Opera - 2012
- "Seraphim" - Simian Mobile Disco - 2012
- "Desire" - Anna Calvi - 2011
- "Isles" - Little Comets - 2011
- "K Hole" - Ali Love - 2006
- "Martell" - The Cribs - 2005
- "What's your Damage" - Test Icicles - 2005
- "Circle, square, triangle" - Test Icicles - 2005
- "Helicopter" (US) - Bloc Party - 2005
- "Pioneers" - Bloc Party - 2005

=== Commercials (selected) ===
- Capture - Apple - 2024
- The Singularity - Squarespace - 2023 (Super Bowl LVII)
- Live the Game - PlayStation - 2019
- Dream with Us - Nike - 2019
- Good Odds - Toyota - 2018 (Super Bowl LII)
- Equal Love - Absolut - 2017
- Daughter - Audi - 2017 (Super Bowl LI)
- Ignition - Honda - 2015
- Feel More - Samsung - 2015

== Awards and nominations (selected) ==
- 2023 Nominated for Hugo award for Best Dramatic Presentation Long Form for 'Severance'
- 2023 Winner of BBC Studios Director Award WFTV
- 2023 Winner of Rising Star award IFTA
- 2023 Nominated for Outstanding Directorial Achievement in Drama Series by DGA for 'Severance'
- 2022 Directed the Peabody Award winning show Severance
- 2022 Primetime Emmy Nominated for Outstanding Drama Series for 'Severance'
- 2022 Nominated for Best Directing in a Streaming Series, Drama by the Hollywood Critics Association for 'Severance'
- 2022 Nominated for Best Narrative Short at Tribeca Film Festival for 'All of This Unreal Time'
- 2014 Nominated for Best Director at UK Music Video Awards
