= Dan Erickson =

American screenwriter

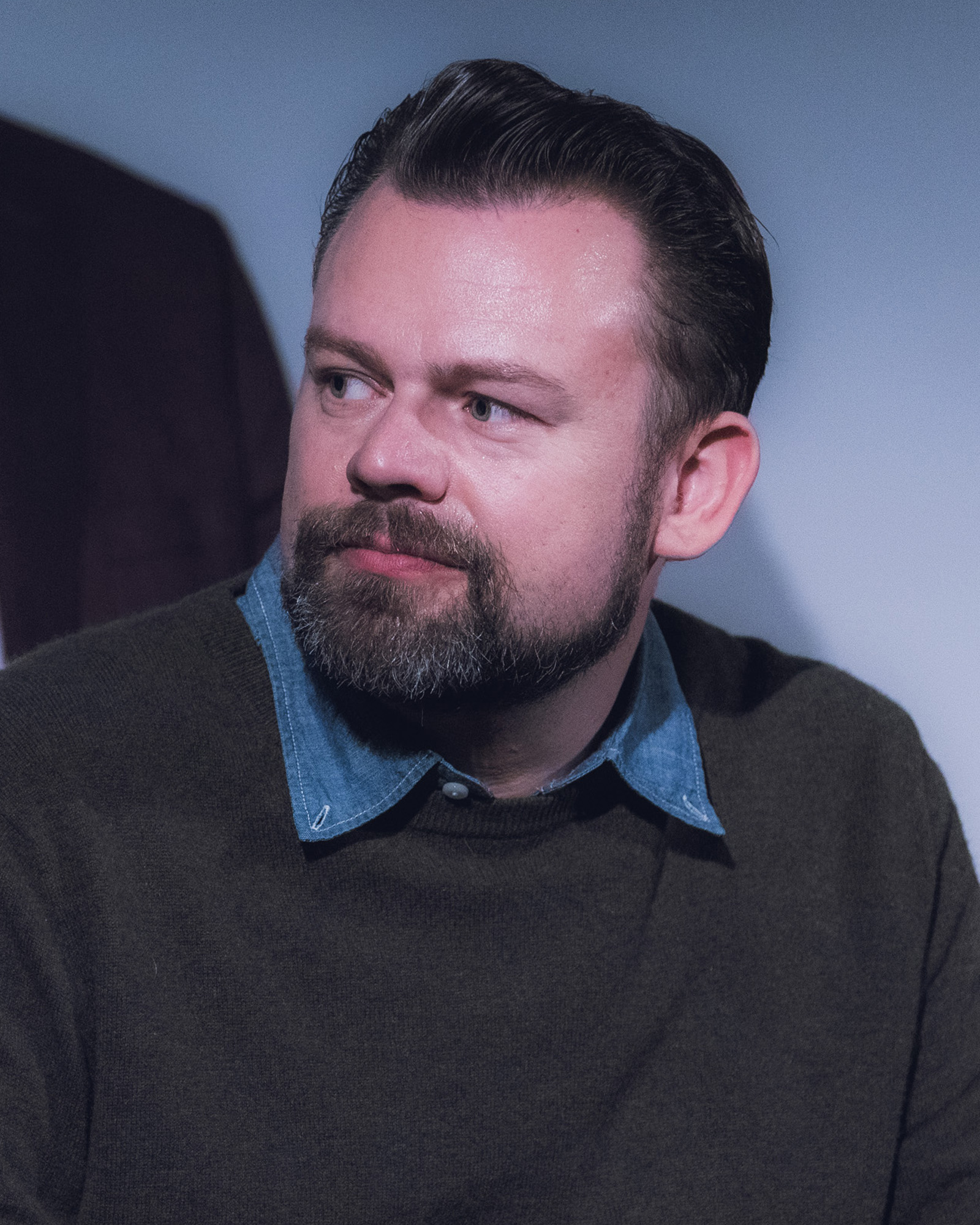
- Erickson in 2025
- Born: Daniel Earling Erickson; January 26, 1984 (age 42); Olympia, Washington, U.S.
- Education: Western Washington University (BA) NYU Tisch School of the Arts (MFA)
- Occupations: Television screenwriter; producer; showrunner
- Years active: 2004-present

Daniel Earling Erickson (born January 26, 1984) is an American television screenwriter, showrunner, and producer. He is best known for creating the psychological thriller television series Severance, which premiered on the Apple TV+ streaming service in February 2022.

== Life and career ==
Erickson is from Olympia, Washington. His parents are Mark and Lynn Erickson, a lawyer and a teacher, respectively. He is a middle child, with an older brother named Matt and a younger sister named Hayley. Erickson has stated that he is very close with both siblings, and that they inspired characters on Severance, with Matt loosely representing the character of Petey, and Hayley serving as the primary inspiration and basis for the character of Devon .

Erickson attended Western Washington University, where he received a bachelor's degree in English, and subsequently graduated from New York University Tisch School of the Arts with a Master of Fine Arts degree in Dramatic Writing for Television.

He wrote for Spike TV's Lip Sync Battle Pre-Show and worked in series development for the now-defunct entertainment company Super Deluxe.

In 2016, Erickson's pilot script for Severance was recognized by the Blood List. He later submitted the script as a writing sample to Ben Stiller’s Red Hour Productions, and Stiller produced the project. In 2019, Apple TV+ picked up Severance for a straight-to-series order with Endeavor Content serving as co-financer and producer. Season 1 of Severance premiered on February 18, 2022, on Apple's streaming service to acclaim. Season 2 premiered on January 17, 2025. It also received acclaim, with an initial score of 100% on the review aggregate site Rotten Tomatoes based on 43 critic reviews.

In September 2022, Erickson was included in the Time 100 Next list, which features "100 emerging leaders from around the world who are shaping the future and defining the next generation of leadership". He and the writers of Severance won twice at the 2023 Writers Guild of America Awards, winning Best New Series and Best Drama Series.

Erickson was announced as the recipient of the 2026 Alumni Achievement Award at Western Washington University at 42 years old.

Erickson is currently single and does not have children of his own, though he is very close to his nieces. Per IMDB, one of his nieces is Evelyn Goelzer, who appeared on the Netflix series Penelope.

== Filmography ==
Year	Title	Writer	Producer	Notes
2011	League of Wonder	Yes	No	Short film
2016–2018	Lip Sync Battle Preshow	Yes	No	
2022–present	Severance	Yes	Yes	Creator, wrote 7 episodes, executive producer

== Awards and honors ==
=== The Astra Awards ===
Year	Category	Nominated work	Result	Ref.
2022	Best Writing in a Streaming Series	Severance (for "The We We Are")	Won	

=== Primetime Emmy Awards ===
Year	Category	Nominated work	Result	Ref.
2023	Outstanding Drama Series	Severance	Nominated	
2023	Outstanding Writing for a Drama Series	Severance (for "The We We Are")	Nominated	
2025	Outstanding Drama Series	Severance	Nominated	
2025	Outstanding Writing for a Drama Series	Severance (for "Cold Harbor")	Nominated	

=== Peabody Awards ===
Year	Category	Nominated work	Result	Ref.
2022	Entertainment	Severance	Won	

=== Writers Guild of America Awards ===
Year	Category	Nominated work	Result	Ref.
2022	Drama Series	Severance	Won	
2022	New Series	Severance	Won	

=== Seoul International Drama Awards ===
Year	Category	Nominated work	Result	Ref.
2025	Best Screenwriter	Severance	Won	
