= Jessica Lee Gagné =

Canadian cinematographer

- Born: 1988 (age 37–38); Quebec City, Quebec, Canada
- Education: François-Xavier-Garneau College; Concordia University
- Occupation: Cinematographer

Jessica Lee Gagné is a Canadian cinematographer and director. She is best known for her work on the films Despite the Night (Malgré la nuit) and Daddy as well as the TV shows Escape at Dannemora and Severance, the latter of which garnered her a Primetime Emmy Award for Outstanding Cinematography for a Series (One Hour).

== Early life ==
Jessica Lee Gagné was born in Quebec City, where her early exposure to cinema came from her father, who owned a video store. She grew up surrounded by VHS tapes, often watching films before and after school. Having an interest in foreign films, her mother familiarized her with European cinema. This environment helped develop and influence her early love for cinema.

Gagné began experimenting with photography at a young age on 35mm film, inheriting cameras from family members. She spent her high school years as the school's photographer and practiced a lot, developing technical skills. She later studied cinema at François-Xavier-Garneau College in Quebec City before pursuing a BFA in Film Production at the Mel Hoppenheim School of Cinema at Concordia University in Montreal from 2009 to 2011. Her time at Concordia as well as filmmakers like Gordon Willis and Canadian cinematographer Sara Mishara reinforced her interest in cinematography. Her education at Concordia also helped her build connections in the industry, which then helped launch her career after graduation.

== Career ==
Gagné began her career in cinematography by working on independent films, gaining early recognition for working on her friend Chloé Robichaud's film Sarah Prefers to Run (2013), which was selected for screening at Cannes Film Festival. After working on other films and short films, she transitioned to television with Escape at Dannemora (2018), directed by Ben Stiller, which served as an important moment in her career. Her collaboration with Stiller continued with the TV series Severance (2022), which earned her recognition for creating a unique visual style. She made her directing debut with the Severance Season 2 episode "Chikhai Bardo," which was partially filmed in the house in which she was living during filming.

As a female director of photography in a male-dominated industry, Gagné has openly discussed the challenges she has faced, especially when working outside of Montreal. She has emphasized that representation matters, particularly when younger women see her behind the camera. She believes it is important to break stereotypes about what roles women can play in the film industry, and her work as a director of photography has gained her respect in a field where women remain underrepresented.

In 2020 she was one of the creators of Anthologie 2020, a short documentary "chain letter" film about the COVID-19 pandemic in Quebec which was screened at the 2021 Festival du nouveau cinéma.

In 2025, for her work on Severance, she became the first woman to win a Primetime Emmy Award for Outstanding Cinematography for a Series (One Hour); her Emmy nominations that year made her the first woman to be nominated for Emmys in the categories of cinematography and directing for the same drama series in the same year.

== Filmography ==
=== Films ===
Year	Title	Director
2013	Sarah Prefers to Run (Sarah préfère la course)	Chloé Robichaud
2013	All That We Make (Fermières)	Annie St-Pierre
2014	Joy of Man's Desiring (Que ta joie demeure)	Denis Côté
2015	Despite the Night (Malgré la nuit)	Philippe Grandrieux
2015	Boris Without Béatrice (Boris sans Béatrice)	Denis Côté
2015	Noir	Yves Christian Fournier
2016	Boundaries (Pays)	Chloé Robichaud
2017	Sweet Virginia	Jamie M. Dagg
2017	Daddy	Ashim Ahluwalia
2018	La Version nouvelle	Michael Yaroshevsky
2020	All Day and a Night	Joe Robert Cole

=== Short films ===
Year	Title	Director
2012	Herd Leader (Chef de meute)	Chloé Robichaud
2015	Chelem	Charles Grenier
2016	Plain and Simple (Tout simplement)	Raphaël Ouellet
2016	Anime	Arnaud Brisebois
2018	From Its Mouth Came a River of High End Residential Appliances	Jon Wang

=== Television ===
Year	Title	Director
2018	Escape at Dannemora	Ben Stiller
2020	Mrs. America	Various
2022–present	Severance	Ben Stiller, Aoife McArdle, herself Directed "Chikhai Bardo"

== Awards ==
Award	Date of ceremony	Category	Film	Result	Ref.
Canadian Screen Awards	2015	Best Cinematography in a Documentary	All That We Make (Fermières) (with Marie Davignon, Geneviève Perron)	Nominated	
Filmfare Awards	2018	Best Cinematography	Daddy (with Pankaj Kumar)	Nominated	
Ostrava Kamera Oko	2016		Despite the Night (Malgré la nuit)	Nominated	
Primetime Emmy Award	2025	Outstanding Cinematography for a Series (One Hour)	Severance: "Hello, Ms. Cobel"	Won	
Primetime Emmy Award	2025	Outstanding Directing for a Drama Series	Severance: "Chikhai Bardo"	Nominated	
