= Tramell Tillman =

American actor (born 1985)

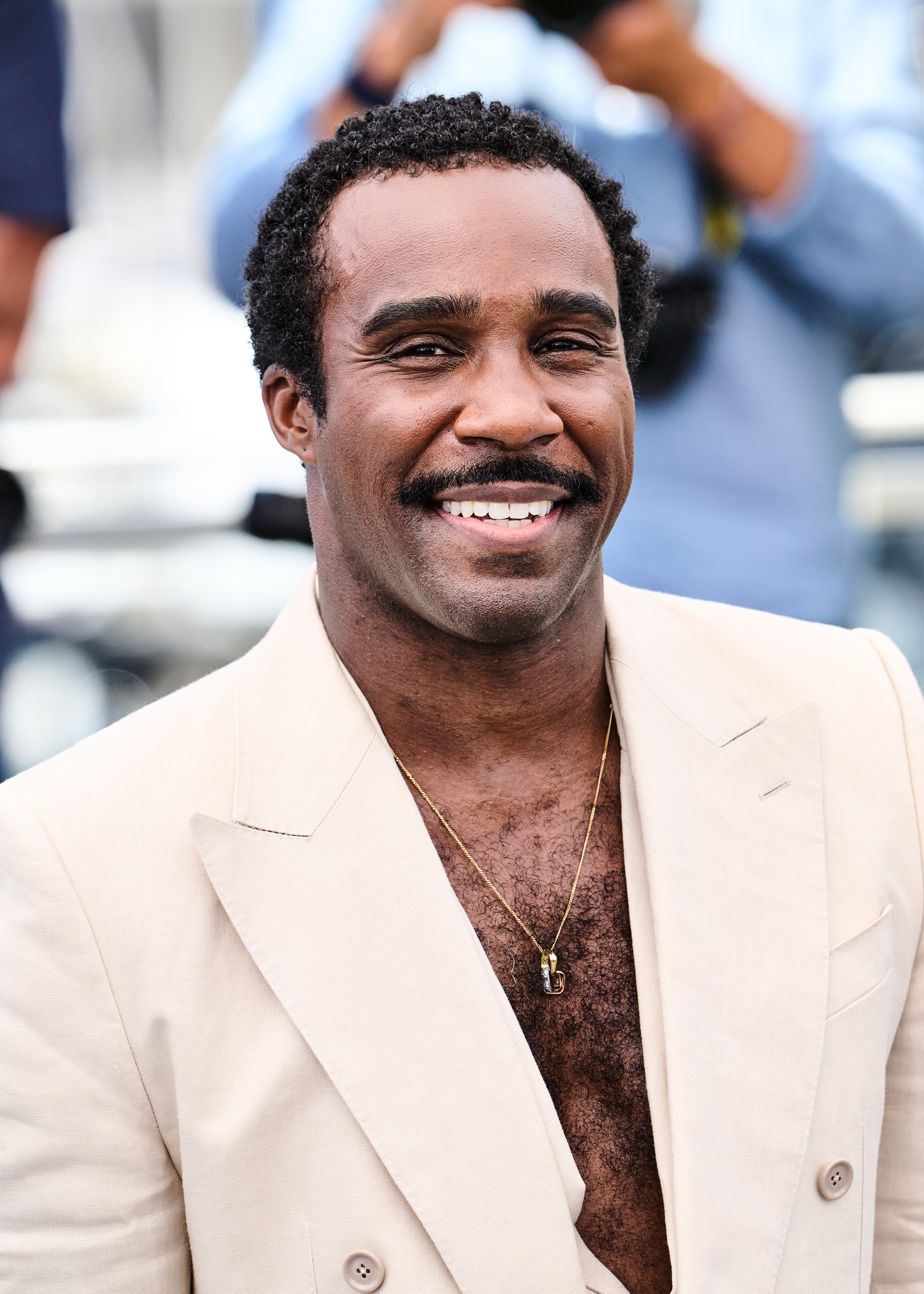
- Tillman at the 2025 Cannes Film Festival
- Born: June 17, 1985 (age 41); Washington, D.C., U.S.
- Education: Xavier University of Louisiana (attended); Jackson State University (BS); University of Tennessee (MFA)
- Occupation: Actor
- Years active: 2015–present
- Website: tramelltillman.com

Tramell Tillman (/trəˈmɛl/ trə-MEL; born June 17, 1985) is an American actor. He is best known for his role as Seth Milchick in the Apple TV+ series Severance (2022–present), for which he became the first Black person and the first openly gay person to win the Primetime Emmy Award for Outstanding Supporting Actor in a Drama Series. He also portrayed Bill Metzger in the Marvel Cinematic Universe film Spider-Man: Brand New Day (2026).

== Early life and education ==
Tillman was born in Washington, D.C., on June 17, 1985. His mother worked for the U.S. federal government, while his father worked for Amtrak. Tillman is the youngest with five older siblings, and was raised Baptist in Largo, Maryland.

Tillman attended Eleanor Roosevelt High School in Greenbelt, Maryland and graduated in 2003. He was then enrolled at Xavier University of Louisiana in New Orleans as a pre-med student with plans to become an orthopedic surgeon, but did not enjoy it. In 2005, after Hurricane Katrina hit New Orleans, Tillman's parents convinced him to transfer to Jackson State University, where he switched his major to mass communications. He graduated summa cum laude with a Bachelor of Science in 2008. In 2014, Tillman became the first African-American man to obtain a Master of Fine Arts in acting from the University of Tennessee.

== Career ==
Tillman has said that he has always admired acting as an art form. He has credited his mother with inspiring him to go into acting, after she encouraged him to participate in a Christmas play when he was a child.

Tillman worked in the nonprofit sector for over a decade before pursuing acting professionally, and drew on his own experiences in corporate America for his breakthrough role as Seth Milchick in the sci-fi thriller series Severance (2022–present). He referred to Milchick as "an amalgamation of colleagues, of former bosses, [and] of caricatures of people" who he worked with during that time. Tillman's performance, especially during the second season, received widespread critical acclaim. In September 2025, he won the Primetime Emmy Award for Outstanding Supporting Actor in a Drama Series, becoming the first Black person and the first openly gay person to win the award. He was the first openly gay Black person to be nominated for it.

In August 2025, Tillman joined the cast of the Marvel Cinematic Universe film Spider-Man: Brand New Day.

== Personal life ==
Tillman has lived in New York City since 2014. He is openly gay.

== Acting credits ==
Key
†	Denotes films that have not yet been released

=== Film ===
Year	Title	Role	Notes
2024	Barron's Cove	Felix	
2024	Sweethearts	Coach Reese	
2025	Mission: Impossible – The Final Reckoning	Capt. Jack Bledsoe	
2026	Spider-Man: Brand New Day	William "Bill" Metzger	
2026	Your Mother Your Mother Your Mother	Talib	
2026	Ebenezer	The Ghost of Christmas Present	
2026	Good Sex †		Post-production
2027	Octet †	Marvin	Post-production

=== Television ===
Year	Title	Role	Notes
2015	Difficult People	Good Samaritan	Episode: "Devil's Three-Way"
2018	Dietland	Steven	10 episodes
2019	Elementary	Detective Ocasio	Episode: "Miss Understood"
2019	Godfather of Harlem	Bobby Robinson	6 episodes
2020	Hunters	Detective Sommers	2 episodes
2022–present	Severance	Seth Milchick	19 episodes
2024	Hit-Monkey	Double-Tap	Voice; 7 episodes

=== Theater ===
Year	Title	Role	Venue	Notes
2015	'Tis Pity She's A Whore	Grimaldi	Red Bull Theatre	New York City
2015	Sweat	Chris	Oregon Shakespeare Festival	Regional/Equity
2016	Hamlet	Laertes	Oregon Shakespeare Festival	Regional/Equity
2017	All The Roads Home	Michael / Phoenix / Trace	Cincinnati Playhouse in the Park	Regional/Equity
2018	Carmen Jones	Sergeant Brown	Classic Stage Company	Off-Broadway
2019	The Great Society	Bob Moses / various characters	Lincoln Center Theatre	Broadway
2022	Good Night, Oscar	Alvin Finney	Goodman Theatre	Chicago
2024	Shit. Meet. Fan.	Logan	MCC Theater	Off-Broadway

== Accolades ==
Year	Award	Category	Nominated work	Result	Ref.
2022	Independent Spirit Awards	Best Supporting Performance in a New Scripted Series	Severance	Nominated	
2022	Hollywood Critics Association TV Awards	Best Supporting Actor in a Streaming Series, Drama	Severance	Nominated	
2022	Screen Actors Guild Awards	Outstanding Performance by an Ensemble in a Drama Series	Severance	Nominated	
2025	Astra TV Awards	Best Supporting Actor in a Drama Series	Severance	Nominated	
2025	Critics' Choice Super Awards	Best Actor in a Science Fiction/Fantasy Series, Limited Series or Made-for-TV Movie	Severance	Nominated	
2025	Dorian Awards	Best Supporting TV Performance — Drama	Severance	Won	
2025	Pan African Film and Arts Festival Awards	Rising Star Award	Severance	Won	
2025	Primetime Emmy Awards	Outstanding Supporting Actor in a Drama Series	Severance	Won	
2025	Television Critics Association Awards	Individual Achievement in Drama	Severance	Nominated	
2026	Actor Awards	Outstanding Performance by an Ensemble in a Drama Series	Severance	Nominated	
2026	Critics' Choice Awards	Best Supporting Actor in a Drama Series	Severance	Won	
2026	Critics' Choice Super Awards	Best Actor in a Science Fiction/Fantasy Series	Severance	Nominated	
2026	Golden Globes	Best Supporting Actor – Series, Miniseries or Television Film	Severance	Nominated	
2026	Satellite Awards	Best Supporting Actor – Series, Miniseries or Television Film	Severance	Nominated	
