= Seth Milchick =

Severance character

- Severance character
- Tramell Tillman as Milchick in the first season of Severance
- First appearance: "Good News About Hell" (2022)
- Created by: Dan Erickson
- Portrayed by: Tramell Tillman

In-universe information
- Nicknames: Mr. Milchick; Mr. Milkshake
- Occupation: Severed Floor Manager
- Affiliation: Lumon Industries

Seth Milchick is a character and one of the main antagonists of the Apple TV+ series Severance, portrayed by Tramell Tillman. He manages the severed floor, and is loyal to the company Lumon. The character has been praised by critics, with Tillman earning a Primetime Emmy Award for his performance in the second season.

== Character biography ==
In Season 1, Milchick is a supervisor on the severed floor and regularly interacts with the Macrodata Refinement department. After Ms. Cobel is fired he is promoted to manager of the severed floor.

== Development ==
Tillman worked in the nonprofit sector for over a decade before pursuing professional acting, and drew on his own experience in the corporate world, saying "I spent over 20 plus years in nonprofit management. I have experience in the corporate world. So, Milchick is an amalgamation of colleagues, of former bosses, of caricatures of people that I've worked with. And even experiences that I've had in corporate America."

== Reception ==
Evan Romano of Men's Health wrote, "There are plenty of takes on the 'loyal muscle' archetype of villain who have become classics. [...] But in Milchick, we get a new, hybrid, 'of the times' version of this character—a muscle-bound loyalist and a corporate stooge at the same time. Not only is Mr. Milchick someone who will carry out exactly the agenda that Lumon and/or the Eagan family and/or Ms. Cobel tell him to, but he'll do it because he's desperate to climb a corporate ladder."

Erin Qualey of Vulture wrote, "The way Tillman makes Milchick’s face go slack when he’s displeased, like he’s transforming into a robotic mercenary, is chilling to behold. [...] He never raises his voice or resorts to violence (that we’ve seen onscreen), but we can tell he’s deep into the cult Kool-Aid and is ready to do absolutely anything to serve Kier and the Eagan family."

Jeffrey Speicher of Collider commented, "Milchick can look Mark, Helly, and the crew in the eyes while flashing that 1,000-megawatt smile and telling them what they want to hear when you know, in his mind, that he is scheming to keep the quartet squarely under his thumb. If you've ever read Machiavelli's seminal work The Prince, you would know that Milchick keeps his employees happy enough so he can continue to rule without impediment, just like the Italian philosopher noted."
