= Who Is Alive? =

- Severance episode
- Lorne uses a handbell to summon the Mammalians Nurturable department.
- Episode no.: Season 2 Episode 3
- Directed by: Ben Stiller
- Written by: Wei-Ning Yu
- Cinematography by: Jessica Lee Gagné
- Editing by: Geoffrey Richman
- Original release date: January 30, 2025 (Note: The episode was promoted with the global release date of January 31, but released in American time zones on the preceding evening.)
- Running time: 53 minutes

Guest appearances
- Gwendoline Christie as Lorne; Merritt Wever as Gretchen; Sydney Cole Alexander as Natalie Kalen; Claudia Robinson as Felicia; Karen Aldridge as Asal Reghabi; Yul Vazquez as Petey Kilmer (voice)

Episode chronology
← Previous "Goodbye, Mrs. Selvig"	Next → "Woe's Hollow"

"Who Is Alive?" is the third episode of the second season of the American science fiction psychological thriller television series Severance. It is the 12th overall episode of the series and was written by producer Wei-Ning Yu, and directed by executive producer Ben Stiller. It was released on Apple TV+ on January 30, 2025.

The series follows employees of Lumon Industries, a biotechnology corporation that uses a medical procedure called "severance" to separate the memories of their employees: at work, Lumon employees, called "innies", can't remember anything outside of work. Outside work, Lumon employees, called "outies", can't remember anything about work. As a result, innies and outies experience two different lives, with distinct personalities and agendas. In the episode, Mark continues the search for Ms. Casey, Dylan receives a surprise visit at work, Cobel considers her future with Lumon, and Milchick receives a gift.

The episode received critical acclaim, with critics praising the performances, intrigue, directing and cliffhanger. At the 77th Primetime Creative Arts Emmy Awards, Merritt Wever received the award for Outstanding Guest Actress in a Drama Series for her performance as Gretchen George.

== Plot ==
Cobel (Patricia Arquette), having driven off in a rage after being confronted by Mark, (Note: As seen in "Goodbye, Mrs. Selvig".) spends the night in her car near a country road. The next morning, she drives until reaching a sign for an area called Salt's Neck, before deciding to turn back. Mark (Adam Scott) times his entrance to Lumon.

At MDR, Mark prints missing-persons posters of Ms. Casey (Dichen Lachman) to hand out around the severed floor. He and Helly (Britt Lower) decide to take the posters to the mysterious "goat department" they previously stumbled upon. (Note: As seen in "The Grim Barbarity of Optics and Design".) Irving resolves to bring the posters to O&D; he tries getting a reticent Dylan to join him, revealing he made sketches of his outie's paintings of the testing-floor hallway. (Note: As seen in "What's for Dinner?".) Their discussion is interrupted by Miss Huang (Sarah Bock), who escorts Dylan to the security room, which has since been converted into an outie family visitation suite. (Note: As glimpsed in "Hello, Ms. Cobel".) Dylan is granted a supervised 18-minute visitation with his outie's wife, Gretchen (Merritt Wever), who shows Dylan a photo of his three children. Dylan learns that his outie has had trouble finding other jobs and is lacking direction in life.

Milchick (Tramell Tillman) arrives at work to find Natalie (Sydney Cole Alexander) waiting in his office to relay the Board's commendation of his performance. As a token of gratitude, he is given a gallery of paintings depicting Kier Eagan as black, which visibly offends him. Mark and Helly arrive at the room where they first found the goats and notice a narrow corridor inside. They crawl through it and emerge upon a large indoor goat pasture. There, they meet a woman named Lorne (Gwendoline Christie), who informs them that they are in the Mammalians Nurturable department. Mark asks Lorne whether she has seen Ms. Casey; Lorne dodges his questions and, when pressed, summons the rest of the disheveled Mammalians to surround Mark and Helly. Mark argues that the Innies should support each other lest they end up "disappeared" like Ms. Casey; Lorne finally admits that Ms. Casey used to conduct wellness sessions in their husbandry tanks and promises not to hinder MDR's search for her.

Meanwhile, Irving arrives at O&D and finds Felicia (Claudia Robinson), and the two cheerfully reminisce over their memories of Burt. While looking through Irving's drawings of Burt, Felicia accidentally sees his sketch of the dark hallway and tells Irving that it resembles the "exports hall," where past O&D employees would take the products they made. That evening, Helena leaves the office and finds Cobel waiting for her in the parking lot. Cobel agrees to rejoin Lumon so long as she is rehired as the severed floor manager to ensure Mark finishes the Cold Harbor file; Helena instead suggests an impromptu meeting with Lumon's board, but Cobel becomes spooked and drives off.

Natalie visits Ricken (Michael Chernus) to discuss adapting his self-help book The You You Are for innies. Devon (Jen Tullock) and Mark glue letters spelling out "WHO IS ALIVE?" onto a bright lamp, hoping to communicate with his innie by burning an afterimage into his retina. Mark tests the device in his car alone but is interrupted by Reghabi (Karen Aldridge), who explains that his strategy will not work since the severance chip dilates one's pupils. She asserts that reintegration is the only way to send messages in and out of Lumon. Mark is initially skeptical in light of Petey's fate, (Note: As seen in "In Perpetuity".) but Reghabi tells him she has gotten better at the procedure and reveals to him that Gemma is indeed alive. A shocked Mark immediately agrees to reintegrating. As they conduct the process in Mark's basement, Mark begins flashing between the present and his orientation on the severed floor.

== Production ==
=== Development ===
The episode was written by producer Wei-Ning Yu, and directed by executive producer Ben Stiller. This marked Yu's first writing credit, and Stiller's eighth directing credit.

=== Writing ===
Dan Erickson explained that the decision to include the reintegration early in the season was based on wanting to pay off the overtime contingency, feeling that "it just made sense." He added, "We thought the most interesting thing about it is that Mark does manage to communicate an important piece of information and also get an important piece of information, and that changes the status quo on both sides. All of a sudden, we're living in a very different world on both the innie and the outie side. So, we wanted to get him to a point where he was actively trying to make contact with his innie and ultimately trying to save his wife." For his performance, Adam Scott explained his method, "In Season 1, when we were figuring out the elevator scenes where you switch back and forth between Innie and Outie, that was really instructive. It was really handy, just as an exercise, to go back and forth super quick and to really sharpen the edges of what each one was... when we're going into Season 2 and shooting these scenes, it really helped that we were able to define each one of them in such a hurry in Season 1."

Zach Cherry explained that Dylan's disappointment upon learning that his outie form struggles to find a job is due to the expectations he set, "He spends a lot of Season 1 hypothesizing and self-mythologizing about who he might be on the outside, and I think that adds to his confidence. He tells all these stories about how he might be a riverboat captain, and he does muscle shows and he hooks up with women left and right. He’s able to tell himself any story about who he is, and it can be true. [...] Then you go, “This story I've been telling myself about myself is not true.” That can impact how you feel about yourself and what you want to do going forward." He also described his encounter with Gretchen as "it's kind of like going on a first date where you already know that the person is going to be into you, so there's this level of comfort that comes with that, despite it being a very strange and somewhat unusual situation for both of them."

Tramell Tillman explained Milchick's reaction to the painting, "One of the reactions [he has] is confusion, because there is a desecration of Kier. And there also is this blackface that is supposed to be a celebration or acknowledgement of Milchick's difference. So there's a lot that’s happening."

=== Filming ===
Scenes of the Mammalians Nurturable department were filmed at Marine Park golf course in Brooklyn. Walls were built on the golf course and the rest of the room was filled in during post-production. Over 50 live goats were used in the scene.

== Critical reviews ==
"Who Is Alive?" received critical acclaim. Saloni Gajjar of The A.V. Club gave the episode an "A–" and wrote, "In a stellar final scene (aided by a pulsating score), Mark's innie and outie keep swapping places in his head, depicting that the reintegration has likely worked. Cue Petey's voice as he asks Severance's favorite existential question, “Who are you?” Yeah, the wait for episode four is going to be torturous."

Alan Sepinwall of Rolling Stone wrote, "Like Reghabi herself, the idea seems to come out of nowhere, especially in an episode that, outside of the goat people scene, hasn’t given Innie Mark a whole lot to do, and thus feels like a strange moment at which to potentially eliminate him as a separate entity." Ben Travers of IndieWire gave the episode a "B+" and wrote, "After two weeks spent exclusively on the inside and then the outside of Lumon HQ, Episode 3 returns to Severance's traditional half-Innie, half-Outie storytelling model — and it's still the weirdest episode of the season. One reason so many curiosities are able to surface in a single hour is because each of our series regulars are sent off on their own."

Erin Qualey of Vulture gave the episode a perfect 5 star rating out of 5 and wrote, "Mark's consciousness begins to shift violently. His mind is blanketed in confusion, and we're treated to a glorious montage of Mark waking up on the conference-room table, his Innie and Outie worlds colliding in a frantic jumble. Punctuated by a fabulous needle drop, the scene is a total rush. “Eminence Front” by the Who plays us out as the episode leaves us (and Mark) reeling with possibility. It's time for my staggered exit, so I’m going to go grab the elevator." Sean T. Collins of Decider wrote, "Clearly this episode is mainly a bridge between the establishing work done by this season's first two installments and whatever will happen now that Mark has been reintegrated. Individual moments and images are its selling points — Cobel fleeing from that parking lot, Milchick grimacing at the patronizing painting, Gwendoline Christie and Merrit Wever showing up, huge Brit-rock needle drops by the Stone Roses and the Who, and so on. But Miss Casey and the Export Hall are still out there, and for now at least, it's the journey, not the destination."

Brady Langman of Esquire wrote, "can we just take a moment to appreciate how far Mark has come? His Outie just went from 'She's alive!' refers to my infant nephew to rework the entire physiology of my brain so I can see my wife again in a single episode. Meanwhile, Innie Mark's transformation from corporate narc to union steward feels complete. And once again, I just have to show appreciation for Adam Scott's blisteringly human performance as both Marks. Kudos to him and the entire Severance crew." Erik Kain of Forbes wrote, "All told, yet another fantastic episode of Severance. So much happened! This is the first episode of the season where we see both the inside and outside worlds/selves, which is nice. And every character has their moment, from Milchick's surprise gift to Dylan's visitation to the Mammalians Nurturable visit and Irving's discovery of the Exports Hall, not to mention Mark's procedure."

Griff Griffin of Newsweek wrote, "The episode ends with Mark experiencing what seems to be a massive identity crisis, with his location and outfit rapidly switching back and forth. On the plus side, he might have a solution to bridging the gap between his innie and outie, which looks to be how he can finally find his wife." Breeze Riley of Telltale TV gave the episode a 4.5 star rating out of 5 and wrote, "After easing audiences back into the world of Lumon, Severance Season 2 Episode 3, “Who is Alive?” bombards them with information and twists. For fans who love the mystery-box elements of the show, the episode is a great time."
