= Goodbye, Mrs. Selvig =

- Severance episode
- Ms. Cobel meets with Helena and Mr. Drummond following the events of the previous season finale
- Episode no.: Season 2 Episode 2
- Directed by: Sam Donovan
- Written by: Mohamad El Masri
- Cinematography by: Suzie Lavelle
- Editing by: Joe Landauer
- Original release date: January 23, 2025 (Note: The episode was promoted with the global release date of January 24, but released in American time zones on the preceding evening.)
- Running time: 46 minutes

Guest appearances
- Ólafur Darri Ólafsson as Mr. Drummond; Bob Balaban as Mark W.; Alia Shawkat as Gwendolyn Y.; Stefano Carannante as Dario R.; Adrian Martinez as Mr. Saliba; Michael Siberry as Jame Eagan; Sydney Cole Alexander as Natalie; Merritt Wever (voice) as Gretchen

Episode chronology
| ← Previous "Hello, Ms. Cobel" | Next → "Who Is Alive?" |

"Goodbye, Mrs. Selvig" is the second episode of the second season of the American science fiction psychological thriller television series Severance. It is the 11th overall episode of the series and was written by co-executive producer Mohamad El Masri, and directed by executive producer Sam Donovan. It was released on Apple TV+ on January 23, 2025.

The series follows employees of Lumon Industries, a biotechnology corporation that uses a medical procedure called "severance" to separate the memories of their employees: at work, Lumon employees, called "innies", can't remember anything outside of work. Outside work, Lumon employees, called "outies", can't remember anything about work. As a result, innies and outies experience two different lives, with distinct personalities and agendas. In the episode, Milchick is assigned to lead the immediate aftermath of the overtime contingency.

The episode received critical acclaim, with critics praising the performances (particularly Tramell Tillman's), cinematography, script, direction, and world-building. It is the first episode of the series to have no scenes on the severed floor, and only features the Outies.

== Plot ==
Following the events of the overtime contingency, (Note: As seen in "The We We Are".) Milchick (Tramell Tillman) is tasked with doing damage control and visits the outies of Dylan (Zach Cherry) and Irving (John Turturro) to inform them they have been fired. Irving lies to Milchick about his whereabouts that night. Helena Eagan (Britt Lower) is castigated by her father Jame (Michael Siberry) for her outburst at the Lumon gala. She and Lumon security enforcer Mr. Drummond (Ólafur Darri Ólafsson) meet with Cobel (Patricia Arquette); Helena thanks Cobel for her loyalty, apologizes on behalf of Lumon for how they have treated her and asks her to return to the company, offering her a promotion to run the "Severance Advisory Council." Cobel is insulted and demands to run the severed floor again, but Helena informs her that Milchick has already taken over. Helena then records an apology for her outburst, blaming it on an adverse reaction to mixing alcohol with medication.

Mark (Adam Scott) reawakens at home, with Devon (Jen Tullock) quickly realizing he is no longer his innie personality. After Ricken's (Michael Chernus) guests leave, Mark and Devon discuss who he was referring to when he shouted "she's alive" and assume he meant Devon's baby daughter Eleanor. Milchick suddenly arrives and explains the overtime contingency to them, but a suspicious Devon does not divulge what Mark's innie said to her. Mark tells Milchick he plans to quit Lumon. He returns home and knocks on Cobel's door but gets no answer. Helena, meanwhile, watches surveillance footage of her innie kissing Mark (Note: As seen in "What's for Dinner?".) with keen interest.

The following morning, Dylan goes for a job interview at a door company but is turned down after admitting that he is severed. He reluctantly tells his wife Gretchen (Merritt Wever) the news over the phone. Mark meets with Devon at Pip's Diner, where Devon presses him on the possibility that his innie could have been saying that Gemma is alive; Mark is offended, reminding Devon that he saw Gemma's body and that it was cremated, and storms out. Unbeknownst to the two of them, Drummond is listening in on their conversation.

That night, Irving calls someone using a payphone, unaware that Burt (Christopher Walken) is watching him from his car. Mark gets another visit from Milchick, who tells him about major reforms at Lumon and offers him a 20% pay raise for returning. Milchick asserts that Mark's innie is happy at work and knows none of the grief that plagues him outside the office. Mark returns to work the next day; Milchick tells Helena, Drummond and Natalie (Sydney Cole Alexander) that he scrambled to find replacements for the rest of Mark's team within 48 hours. (Note: The replacements—Mark W. (Bob Balaban), Gwendolyn Y. (Alia Shawkat) and Dario R. (Stefano Carannante)—were introduced in "Hello, Ms. Cobel".) Helena insists that Mark must complete the "Cold Harbor" file. (Note: As seen in "Hello, Ms. Cobel".)

Three days later, the board receives Mark's request to have the rest of his team back and agrees to his wishes. Milchick rehires Irving and Dylan, while Helena sends herself back to the severed floor. At the end of the day, Mark returns home and runs into Cobel, whom he confronts about lying to him for two years about her identity. He asks if she knows something about Gemma; Cobel takes a long pause before angrily driving off, leaving Mark stunned.

== Production ==
=== Development ===
The episode was written by co-executive producer Mohamad El Masri, and directed by executive producer Sam Donovan.

=== Writing ===
When questioned over Milchick's goals, Tramell Tillman said, "I don't think it's clearly defined. You can't do what this man does and not have a sense of passion for it. This man revitalized the whole break room. He built a visitation suite. He developed a PR campaign to paint the innies as heroes. Yeah, there's something there. I don't know what that something is, but that, to me, speaks to care, it speaks to attention, it speaks to focus. You wouldn't do that if this was a part-time job."

Dylan applying for a job at a door factory is a nod to series creator Dan Erickson, who worked at a door company when he came up with the concept for the series. Erickson "timidly brought it up" to executive producer Ben Stiller, who liked the idea. Erickson also commented, "That's something I always love, when we get to do — similar to the non-dinner party in Season 1, where you just — it's like, how are people actually talking about this out in the world?"

=== Opening credits sequence ===
The episode introduces a new opening credits sequence, while still maintaining the original theme song. Designer and 3D artist Oliver Latta, who designed the first season's credits sequence, returned to create a new sequence for season 2. Latta visited Severance's New York set, but was only provided specific plot points, without having the opportunity to watch any of the episodes.

== Critical reviews ==
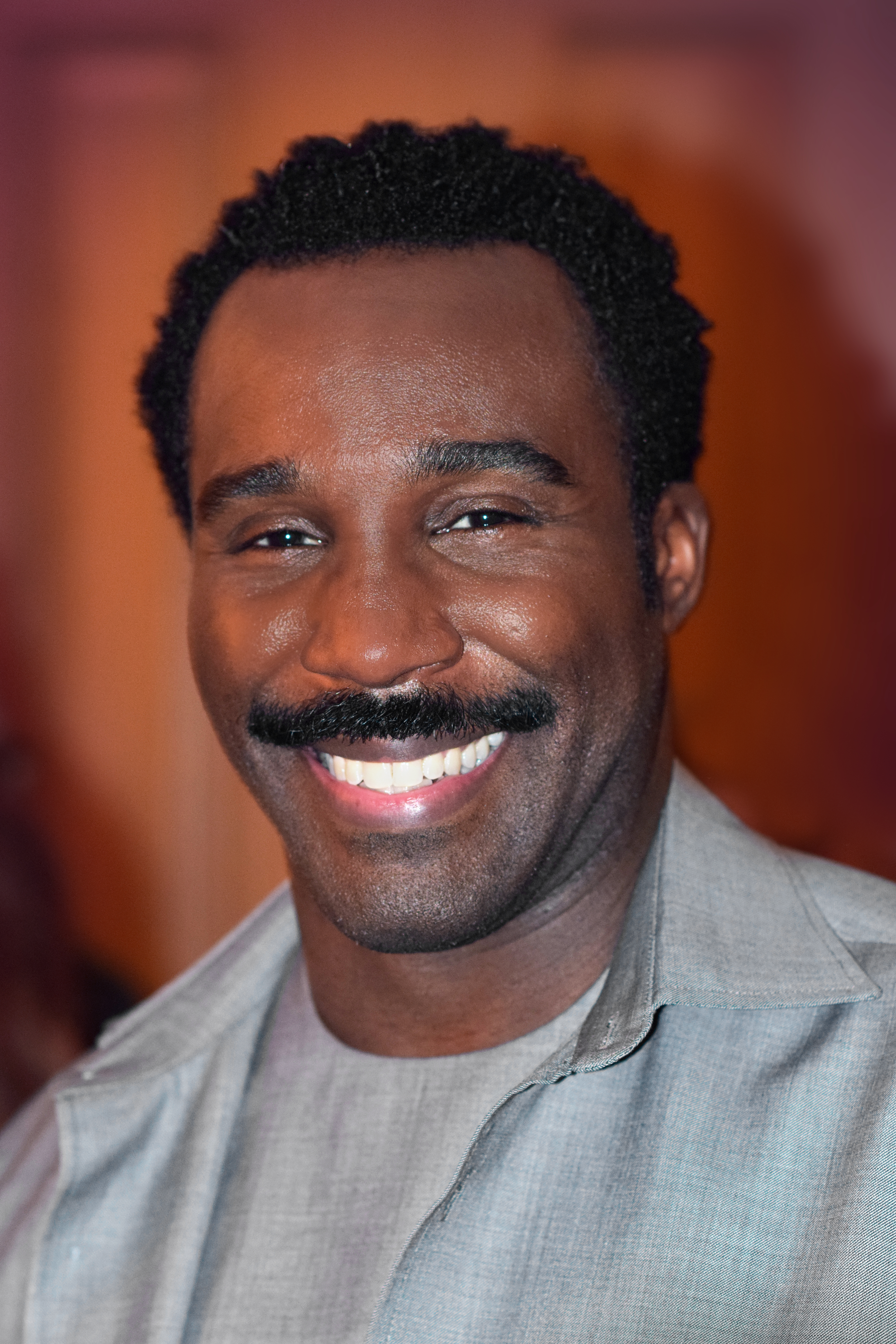
Tramell Tillman received high praise for his performance in the episode.

"Goodbye, Mrs. Selvig" received critical acclaim. Saloni Gajjar of The A.V. Club gave the episode an "A–" and wrote, "As a lifelong Kier devotee, Cobel is shaken up and doesn't seem like she'd stand for this mistreatment. This sets the stage for her slowly turning on the Eagans — or she'll return with a vengeance and a new plan to secure her job back. You never know with her because, as Mark puts it, “What the fuck is this all about?” I'm assuming Cobel has answers, and they're why she's barely been in season two."

Alan Sepinwall of Rolling Stone wrote, "We don't know what Cold Harbor is, don't know why Ms. Huang is a child (other than because of when she was born), why Gemma is alive but severed, and why Helly (or Helena?) is lying to the other innies. But “Goodbye, Mrs. Selvig” turns over far more cards than it could have this early in the season. And even if both the innies and outies are partially in the dark, we now have a pretty good idea of what's happening, and why, as we head deeper down this path."

Ben Travers of IndieWire gave the episode an "A–" and wrote, "Episode 2 covers a lot of ground in its tight 47-minute runtime, but its main episodic arc connects two key moments: The first is the same one we've been talking about for the past three years: when Mark's Innie bursts out of his sister's back room, clutching a photo of Gemma and shouting, “She's alive!” The second is, appropriately, split between two moments: when Mark chooses to go back to Lumon and when he confronts Ms. Cobel. In between, Mark's Outie is shown being dismissive and disconnected."

Erin Qualey of Vulture gave the episode a perfect 5 star rating out of 5 and wrote, "Good-bye, Ms. Cobel. Hello, Mr. Milchick. The man certainly earned his stripes this week, doing double-duty house calls to all the refiners, walling up Wellness, creating an absolutely unhinged training video, hiring a whole new MDR team for Mark — his description of Dario R. as a “floater” was curious — and promoting Miss Huang. There are never enough words to express how amazing Tramell Tillman is, so let's just say I'm making my eyes impressed."

Sean T. Collins of Decider wrote, "I wish we weren't being kept in the dark about Dylan and Helena's lives at home, but at least there's some dark to explore. I'm interested in these people, not the meticulously constructed world around them."

Brady Langman of Esquire wrote, "Severance has made it fairly clear for a long time now that Cobel knows what happened to Gemma. But if she's distancing herself from Lumon, will she actually consider telling Mark what she knows? Where is she going that late at night anyway?"

Erik Kain of Forbes wrote, "All told, this was another great episode of Severance. It's interesting to see everything from the Innie perspective last week, and then see how events unfold on the outside this week, especially because it shows just how duplicitous and manipulative Lumon is when it comes to their handling of the Innies."

Griff Griffin of Newsweek wrote, "The effects of the Macrodat Uprising are everywhere. Where Severance's opening episode of season 2 focused on innies, episode 2 casts the lens on outies. Specifically, how the outies of Mark, Helly, Irving and Dylan are reacting to last season's mutiny."

Breeze Riley of Telltale TV gave the episode a 4 star rating out of 5 and wrote, "So far this season, Severance is leaning hard into the mystery box/sci-fi element of the show. It's already established that the corporate work world is a hellscape and put pieces on the board, and now it's time to see how this twisted game with Mark and the others plays out."

=== Accolades ===
TVLine named Tramell Tillman the "Performer of the Week" for the week of January 25, 2025, for his performance in the episode. The site wrote, "Milchick convinced Mark that his Innie is happy at Lumon ("The solace he has found down there will make its way to you"), and Tillman's rock-solid certainty almost had us ready to sign up for the severed procedure ourselves. It's been a pleasure to see more of Mr. Milchick's personality come to light in Season 2 — and we can promise that we'll see more of that as the season progresses — and in creating such a fascinating character, Tillman has proven he's worthy of his own corner office."

| Award | Year | Category | Recipient | Result | Ref. |
|---|---|---|---|---|---|
| British Society of Cinematographers | 2026 | Best Cinematography in a Television Drama (International/Streaming) | Suzie Lavelle | Won | |
