= Hello, Ms. Cobel =

- Severance episode
- The MDR team is led by Miss Huang to the break room.
- Episode no.: Season 2 Episode 1
- Directed by: Ben Stiller
- Written by: Dan Erickson
- Cinematography by: Jessica Lee Gagné
- Editing by: Geoffrey Richman
- Original release date: January 16, 2025 (Note: The episode was promoted with the global release date of January 17, but released in American time zones on the preceding evening.)
- Running time: 48 minutes

Guest appearances
- Bob Balaban as Mark W.; Alia Shawkat as Gwendolyn Y.; Stefano Carannante as Dario R.; Sarah Sherman as Animated Water Tower (voice); Keanu Reeves as Animated Lumon Administrative Building (voice; uncredited)

Episode chronology
← Previous "The We We Are"	Next → "Goodbye, Mrs. Selvig"

"Hello, Ms. Cobel" is the first episode of the second season of the American science fiction psychological thriller television series Severance. It is the 10th overall episode of the series and was written by series creator Dan Erickson, and directed by executive producer Ben Stiller. It was released on Apple TV+ on January 16, 2025.

The series follows employees of Lumon Industries, a biotechnology corporation that uses a medical procedure called "severance" to separate the memories of their employees: at work, Lumon employees, called "innies", can't remember anything outside of work. Outside work, Lumon employees, called "outies", can't remember anything about work. As a result, innies and outies experience two different lives, with distinct personalities and agendas. In the episode, the MDR team return to the office after enacting the overtime contingency, with Lumon initiating responses to their behavior.

The episode is the first of the series to take place entirely on the severed floor, and only features the Innies. It received critical acclaim, with critics praising the production and world-building. It was recognised at the 77th Primetime Creative Arts Emmy Awards for Outstanding Cinematography for a Series (One Hour).

== Plot ==
Mark (Adam Scott) wakes up on the severed floor in his innie personality. Panicked, he runs through the hallways, finding Ms. Casey's wellness room decommissioned. When he returns to the MDR office, he is shocked to find three new employees as his co-workers: Mark W. (Bob Balaban), Dario R. (Stefano Carannante) and Gwendolyn Y. (Alia Shawkat). Milchick (Tramell Tillman) arrives with balloons, welcoming him back.

Milchick explains that it has been five months since the innies' revolt, but that it is time to heal and move on. He introduces him to the new deputy manager of the severed floor, Miss Huang (Sarah Bock), who is surprisingly young. He also reveals that Cobel has been let go for detrimental conduct and that he has replaced her as the manager of the severed floor. According to Milchick, after the incident, Mark and the group became the face of "severance reform." When Mark presses Milchick on the whereabouts of the original MDR team, he says the other outies refused to return to Lumon, yet Mark's outie insisted on returning to work. Incredulous, Mark demands to hear this from the other members directly, but Milchick refuses to let Mark contact them, forcing him to accept his new MDR team.

The following day, Mark slips a handwritten note in Mark W.'s coat, warning his outie version of the conditions inside and asking him to intervene. Mark W. instead informs Milchick, who removes Mark from his Department Chief status and bequeaths it upon Mark W. Mark misleads Milchick with a fake threat in the kitchen, seizing the chance to run to Milchick's office and use the speaker to try to contact Lumon's board, but is seemingly unable to make contact before Milchick returns to stop him. Milchick orders Mark to leave in the elevator, after which the latter says he simply wants his team back.

When he awakens the following day, Mark sees Dylan (Zach Cherry), Irving (John Turturro) and Helly (Britt Lower) arrive, explaining the situation to them. Miss Huang takes them to a renovated break room, where Milchick is waiting for them. He plays them an animated film that explains that the "Macrodat Uprising" resulted in new reforms at Lumon to improve working conditions and ultimately expresses gratitude for their actions. The video includes recordings of the innies' conversations the day of their revolt.

Milchick subsequently gives the four an option: if they want to quit, they are allowed to do so in their innie form by the end of the day. After he leaves, Dylan asks the others to divulge their experiences during the overtime contingency. Mark shares what he saw and learned on the outside, including the revelation that Ms. Casey was married to his outie and was thought to have died. However, Helly fabricates a story and does not reveal her outie's identity as Helena Eagan and Irving cannot bring himself to talk about his attempt to meet Burt.

Despite feeling that their innies and outies are not the same, Helly tells Mark she will stay to help him find Ms. Casey. Irving decides to leave, deciding that his innie life is now pointless after finding out Burt's outie has another romantic partner. Dylan tries to comfort him, and Irving whispers that he woke up in his apartment, finding a painting of a dark hallway with an elevator at the end. Huang interrupts them, as Milchick wants to see Dylan in his office. Milchick finally tells Dylan a tidbit of information about his outie, revealing that his wife's name is Gretchen. He takes Dylan through a hallway, explaining that he is planning a new suite where their outies' families could visit them, but asks him not to tell the others. When Dylan returns to his cubicle, he sees that Irving has changed his mind and chosen to stay. Having all chosen to stay, the team resumes its work. Mark's latest file, "Cold Harbor," is shown to pertain to Gemma.

== Production ==
=== Development ===
The episode was written by series creator Dan Erickson, and directed by executive producer Ben Stiller. This marked Erickson's fourth writing credit, and Stiller's seventh directing credit.

=== Writing ===
Erickson explained that the characters felt "rattled" after the events of the first season finale, which explained Helly's decision to lie about her Outie identity, affirming that "each of them has to make a decision when they come back as to how much of that they are willing or ready to share." He explained that Helly's decision is based on the "horrifying" discovery that she was "what she hates the most."

The MDR group was always set to reunite in the first episode, with Erickson explaining "at the end of the day, they're the heart and soul of the show. We did talk at one point about drawing that out a little bit more, and it was tempting, I remember the day that we shot the first scene with Stefano and Bob and Alia, we were like, “Oh, I would want to watch this show too. This would also be a really fun show in an alternate universe.” But even as charming as that group is, I think there's a sense of relief that comes in that scene where Irving and Dylan and Helly do come out of the elevator, because we've invested so much in them, and we love them so much, and we want to see them together. We talked about drawing it out a little bit, but at the end of the day we know what people want, let's get there." He added, "we wanted it to be a little bit of a misdirect, but then ultimately bringing us back to the team that we've come to know and love."

=== Casting ===
The episode introduces Sarah Bock as Miss Huang, the new deputy manager of the severed floor. Bock explained that her character's intentions are that "she might be a little bit more in control than she seems, which was kind of my first clue into her odd but definitely strong-willed personality." Erickson explained that the decision to write the character as a child was done to give a "strange and funny" reaction, as it would prove difficult to hate a child despite her connection to Lumon. He added, "it throws the innies off their game, because there's almost this intrinsic desire to protect this person, even though she is on the team of the oppressors."

=== Filming ===
The episode was shot over five months, due to a filming schedule in which scenes were shot out of order. Stiller intended the opening scene of a panicked Mark running through the halls to be a contrast to the scene of him happily walking through them in the first-season premiere, saying "let's tell everybody this is going to be a little bit more jacked up, a little more energy, a little more ... The stakes are a little bit higher, and let's do this in a way that we haven't seen before."

The episode is the first of the series to take place entirely on the severed floor. The shot of Mark going up and back down in the elevator was done in one take.

=== Stop motion "Lumon is Listening" video ===
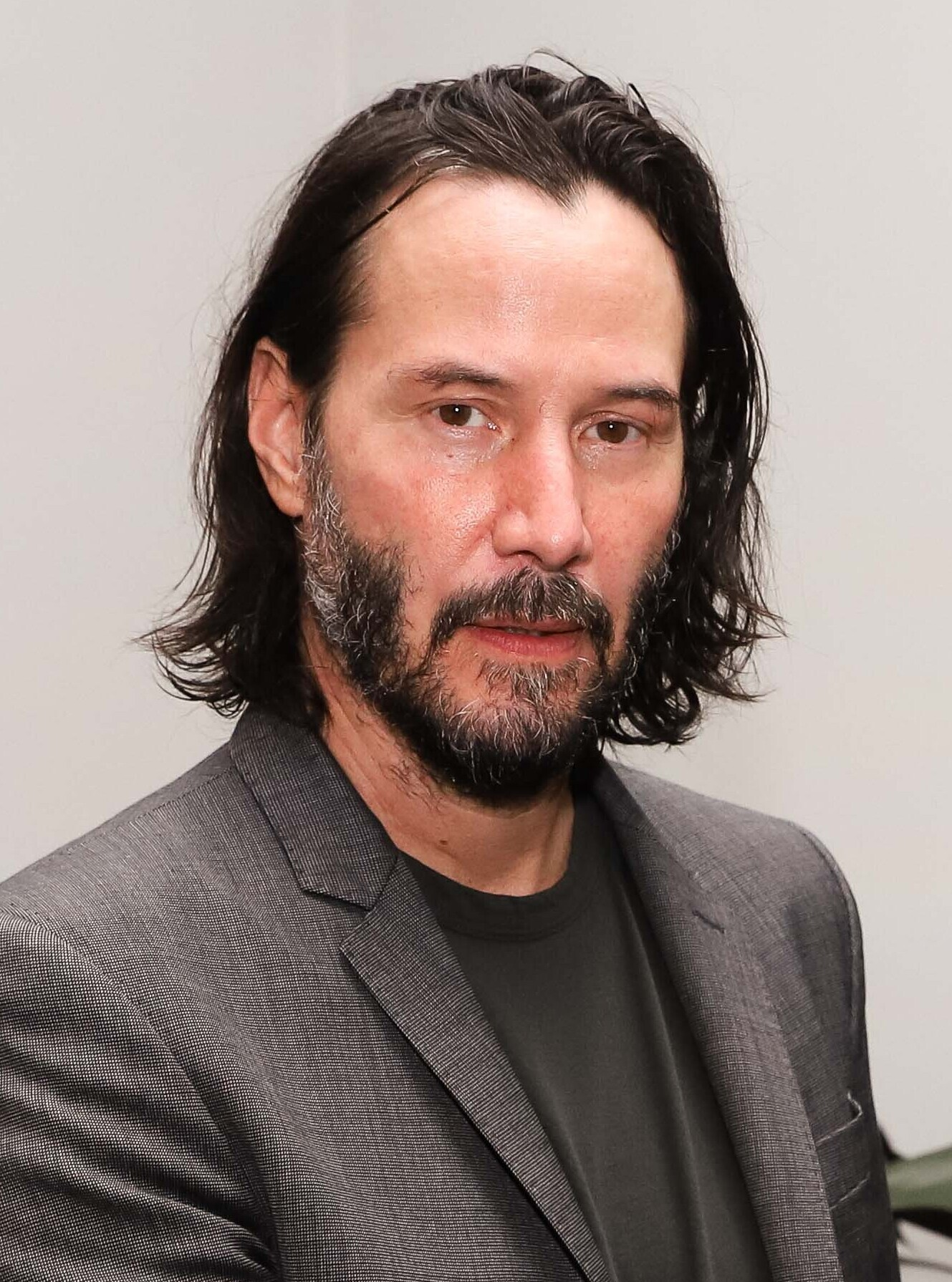
Keanu Reeves makes an uncredited appearance in the episode as the narrator of the "Lumon is Listening" video.

The characters are shown a stop motion video about Lumon's reaction to the characters' use of the overtime contingency, which the video refers to as the "MDR uprising." The video is narrated by Lumon's office building, voiced by actor Keanu Reeves. Stiller revealed that he originally asked Barack Obama to voice the video. While Obama was a fan of the series, he had to decline due to scheduling conflicts.

The video was created by Duke Johnson, and was the first footage filmed of season 2. Irving's head catching fire is a reference to the Heat Miser character from the 1974 stop motion Christmas special The Year Without a Santa Claus. Comedian Sarah Sherman provides the voice of the water tower.

== Reception ==
=== Critical reception ===
"Hello, Ms. Cobel" received critical acclaim. Saloni Gajjar of The A.V. Club gave the episode an "A" and wrote, "Severance's team takes a risk by telling us nothing in this episode about how their Outies are dealing with what the Innies pulled off. But we've waited so long for the consequences, what's another week to see how Mark Scout is coping after learning that his wife might be alive or how Helena Eagan feels about her counterpart's on-stage declaration? There's also Burt opening the door to a maniacal Irving screaming his name. I know these big questions go unresolved, yet it's impressive how 'Hello, Ms. Cobel' offers other answers."

Alan Sepinwall of Rolling Stone wrote, "It's a striking image on which to end this thrillingly weird return to the world of Severance. Despite placing us inside the head of Innie Mark, the hour also fiendishly allows us to see the world the way Lumon management does. Severed life is awful for Helly and the others, but it's damned entertaining for us to watch."

Erin Qualey of Vulture gave the episode a perfect 5-star rating out of 5 and wrote, "After an almost three-year hiatus, Severance has finally returned, delivering a winning hourlong episode that focuses solely on the Innies in the wake of their mental jailbreak."

Ben Travers of IndieWire gave the episode an "A–" and wrote, "The Board certainly wants the MDR team to feel like they've won, or at least like they've made gains — hence all the hullabaloo about The Great Macrodat Uprising — but no corporation does all that out of the kindness of its nonexistent heart. Lumon is getting something out of Mark, Helly, Dylan, and Irving sorting numbers at their work stations, and it's got to be something more valuable than everything they're doing to keep them there. What could it be? Well, that's what we've been asking all along, isn't it? The more things change."

Brady Langman of Esquire wrote, "By ending the season 2 premiere right where season 2 started, Severance made what might just be its most haunting argument yet: That either we're suckers for pain, or capitalism has a chokehold on us all. Or both."

Erik Kain of Forbes wrote, "All told, a fantastic return to Severance even if we'll have to likely wait until next week to learn what's going on up above with Mark Scout and the rest of the characters outside the halls of Lumon. The music, the cinematography, the sense of urgency, the weird quirkiness, it's all back with verve and gusto. I have no complaints."

Griff Griffin of Newsweek wrote, "The company says it has offered up some new incentives in order to benefit its employees, including free sweets, pineapple bobbing, and a room of funny mirrors. There are no reforms of any value. At the end of the episode, the four employees sit down to work, seemingly in a good mood at being reunited. It can't last long."

Breeze Riley of Telltale TV gave the episode a 4.5 star rating out of 5 and wrote, "After an almost three-year hiatus, Apple TV+'s sci-fi thriller Severance is back for Season 2. Was it worth the wait to discover what happened to the 'Innies' after they made contact with the outside world? If the premiere ... is any indicator, yes it was."

=== Accolades ===
Award	Year	Category	Recipient(s)	Result	Ref.
American Society of Cinematographers	2026	Episode of a One-Hour Regular Series	Jessica Lee Gagné	Nominated	
Creative Arts Emmy Awards	2025	Outstanding Cinematography for a Series (One Hour)	Jessica Lee Gagné	Won	
Creative Arts Emmy Awards	2025	Outstanding Special Visual Effects in a Single Episode	Various (Note: Eric Leven, Sean Findley, Shawn Hillier, Radost Ridlen, Martin Kolejak, Brian Holligan, Alex Lemke, Michael Huber, and Djuna Wahlrab)	Nominated	
