= Severance (TV series) =

American television series (2022–present)

- Genre: Black comedy; Dystopian; Mystery box; Psychological thriller; Science fiction
- Created by: Dan Erickson
- Showrunner: Dan Erickson
- Starring: Adam Scott; Zach Cherry; Britt Lower; Tramell Tillman; Jen Tullock; Dichen Lachman; Michael Chernus; John Turturro; Christopher Walken; Patricia Arquette; Sarah Bock
- Composer: Theodore Shapiro
- Country of origin: United States
- Original language: English
- No. of seasons: 2
- No. of episodes: 19

Production
- Executive producers: Ben Stiller; Nicholas Weinstock; Jackie Cohn; Mark Friedman; Dan Erickson; Andrew Colville; Chris Black; John Cameron; Beau Willimon; Caroline Baron; Richard Schwartz; Jordan Tappis; Adam Scott; Patricia Arquette
- Producers: Aoife McArdle; Amanda Overton; Gerry Robert Byrne
- Cinematography: Jessica Lee Gagné; Matt Mitchell; Suzie Lavelle; David Lanzenberg
- Editors: Geoffrey Richman; Gershon Hinkson; Erica Freed Marker
- Running time: 37–76 minutes
- Production companies: Red Hour Productions; Fifth Season (Note: Known as Endeavor Content for season 1); Westward (season 2); Animals & People (season 2); Apple Studios
- Budget: US$200 million (season 2)

Original release
- Network: Apple TV+
- Release: February 18, 2022 – present
- Network: Apple TV

Severance is an American science fiction psychological thriller television series created by Dan Erickson, and executive produced and primarily directed by Ben Stiller. It stars Adam Scott, Zach Cherry, Britt Lower, Tramell Tillman, Jen Tullock, Dichen Lachman, Michael Chernus, John Turturro, Christopher Walken, Patricia Arquette, and Sarah Bock. The series follows employees at Lumon Industries, a sinister biotechnology corporation, who have undergone "severance"—a procedure that splits a person's memories between work and their personal life. This creates two separate identities for employees: the "innie", who has no knowledge of the outside world, and the "outie", who lives their life outside without any knowledge of their job.

Erickson and Stiller first developed Severance in 2015, with the series being greenlit by Apple TV in 2019, with Scott attached. The cast for the first season was rounded out by December 2020, and the cast for the second season was announced in October 2022. Principal photography for the series has taken place in New York, New Jersey and Newfoundland. Its first season aired from February 18 until April 8, 2022, and its second season from January 17 to March 21, 2025. (Note: The official release date is on January 17, 2025. However, Apple TV+ actually premiered the first episode at 9PM EST on January 16, 2025.) Severance has been renewed for a third season. In February 2026, it was reported that Apple TV had acquired the intellectual property and all rights to the series from Fifth Season, with Apple Studios to become the production company for the series starting with the third season.

Severance received acclaim for its cinematography, direction, production design, musical score, story, and performances. Its accolades include 41 Primetime Emmy Award nominations, winning for Outstanding Lead Actress in a Drama Series for Lower and Outstanding Supporting Actor in a Drama Series for Tillman. Scott was nominated for a Primetime Emmy Award, two Television Critics Association Awards, and a Golden Globe Award, while Stiller and Erickson received Emmy nominations for directing and writing.

== Cast and characters ==
=== Main ===
- Adam Scott as Mark S./Mark Scout, a former history professor and a severed worker for Lumon Industries in the Macrodata Refinement (MDR) department.
- Zach Cherry as Dylan G./Dylan George, Mark's severed co-worker in the MDR department, who is shown to greatly enjoy the company perks.
- Britt Lower as Helly R./Helena Eagan, a rebellious new severed employee in the MDR department at Lumon.
- Tramell Tillman as Seth Milchick, the Deputy Manager on the severed floor at Lumon, who becomes the manager in Season 2.
- Jen Tullock as Persephone "Devon" Scout-Hale, Mark's sister.
- Dichen Lachman as Ms. Casey/Gemma Scout, who serves as the wellness counselor on the severed floor at Lumon.
- Michael Chernus as Ricken Hale, an eccentric self-help author who is Devon's husband and Mark's brother-in-law.
- John Turturro as Irving B. / Irving Bailiff, Mark's severed co-worker in the MDR department, who is a stickler for company policy and is drawn to Burt.
- Christopher Walken as Burt G. / Burt Goodman, another severed employee and the head of the Optics and Design (O&D) division who is drawn to Irving.
- Patricia Arquette as Harmony Cobel, the manager of the severed floor at Lumon. Outside of work, she assumes the false identity of Mark's next-door neighbor, "Mrs. Selvig".
- Sarah Bock as Eustice Huang (season 2), the young new Deputy Manager of the Severed floor.

=== Recurring ===
- Yul Vazquez as Peter "Petey" Kilmer (season 1; voice season 2), Mark's former severed co-worker and best friend in the MDR division, who left Lumon under mysterious circumstances.
- Michael Cumpsty as Doug Graner (season 1), the head of security on Lumon's severed floor.
- Nikki M. James as Alexa (season 1), Devon's midwife and one of Mark's love interests.
- Sydney Cole Alexander as Natalie Kalen, Lumon's PR representative and speaker for the mysterious Board.
- Nora Dale as Gabby Arteta (season 1), the wife of Senator Angelo Arteta, whom Devon encounters at a birthing retreat.
- Mark Kenneth Smaltz as Judd, a security guard at Lumon.
- Donald Webber Jr. as Patton, a friend of Ricken's.
- Grace Rex as Rebeck, a friend of Ricken's.
- Annie McNamara as Danise (season 1), a friend of Ricken's.
- Claudia Robinson as Felicia, a severed O&D division employee who is close with Burt.
- Karen Aldridge as Asal Reghabi, a former Lumon surgeon who performs reintegrations.
- Michael Siberry as Jame Eagan, the current CEO of Lumon.
- Darri Ólafsson as Mr. Drummond (season 2), an intimidating Lumon enforcer who is involved with severance operations.
- Merritt Wever as Gretchen George (season 2), Dylan's wife.
- Robby Benson as Dr. Mauer (season 2), a doctor on Lumon's testing floor.
- Gwendoline Christie as Lorne (season 2), a severed employee running the Mammalians Nurturable division.
- Sandra Bernhard as Cecily (season 2), a nurse on the testing floor.

=== Guest ===
- Marc Geller as Kier Eagan, the late founder of Lumon, who is worshipped with cult-like devotion within the company; he is represented throughout the series in sculptures, paintings, and audio recordings.
- Cassidy Layton as June Kilmer (season 1), Petey's daughter.
- Joanne Kelly as Nina (season 1), Petey's ex-wife.
- Ethan Flower as Angelo Arteta (season 1), a Lumon-backed state senator who supports legalizing the severance procedure and is married to Gabby Arteta, with whom he has three children.
- Rajat Suresh as Balf (season 1), a friend of Ricken's.
- Bob Balaban as Mark Wilkins (season 2), a new member of MDR, from Lumon branch 5X.
- Alia Shawkat as Gwendolyn Y. (season 2), a new member of MDR, from Lumon branch 5X.
- Stefano Carannante as Dario Rossi (season 2), a new member of MDR.
- Sarah Sherman (season 2) as the voice of a stop-motion water tower in a Lumon industrial film.
- Adrian Martinez as Mr. Saliba (season 2), a manager at a door factory who interviews Dylan for a position.
- John Noble as Fields (season 2), Burt's husband.
- James LeGros as Hampton (season 2), an old acquaintance of Harmony Cobel from her hometown, Salt's Neck.
- Jane Alexander as Celestine "Sissy" Cobel (season 2), Harmony's reclusive aunt in Salt's Neck who is a staunch Eagan devotee.

Ben Stiller has an uncredited voice cameo as an animated version of Kier Eagan in season 1. Keanu Reeves has an uncredited voice cameo as an animated Lumon building in a Lumon industrial film in season 2.

== Episodes ==
Season	Episodes	Originally released	
Season	Episodes	First released	Last released
1	9	February 18, 2022	April 8, 2022
2	10	January 16, 2025	March 20, 2025

=== Season 1 (2022) ===
No. overall	No. in season	Title	Directed by	Written by	Original release date
1	1	"Good News About Hell"	Ben Stiller	Dan Erickson	February 18, 2022
Mark Scout, who works in Lumon Industries' Macrodata Refinement (MDR) department, discovers he is being promoted to department head in light of his coworker Petey's sudden departure. His first task is to orient Helly, his replacement, who wakes up in a conference room with no memory of who or where she is. After being given an orientation and learning her name, she demands—and is allowed—to leave, but finds she is unable. She watches a video explaining that she has undergone the "severance" procedure, which split her memories to create a version of herself that will only exist inside the workplace. The "outside" version of Mark, a former professor grieving his wife Gemma's death and living in the Lumon-subsidized town of Kier, encounters Petey, who claims to have reversed his supposedly-permanent severance. Mark returns home and interacts with his neighbor, "Mrs. Selvig", unaware that she is his senior manager Harmony Cobel.
2	2	"Half Loop"	Ben Stiller	Dan Erickson	February 18, 2022
The previous day, Helly undergoes the severance procedure as a new employee, implanting a microchip inside her brain. At the office, the severed (or "innie") Helly is introduced to her coworkers, Dylan and Irving, and is instructed that her job is to sort cryptic numbers into categories. During a welcome party headed by deputy floor manager Seth Milchick, Helly attempts to escape by writing her outside self (or "outie") a resignation note, but the elevator shuts down due to Lumon's built-in "code detectors", which prevent unauthorized communication between selves. Mark claims responsibility and is put into the "break room" as punishment. Irving hallucinates a black liquid covering his desk and is administered a "wellness check" with counselor Ms. Casey. At the wellness center, Irving meets Burt, head of the Optics & Design (O&D) department. Outside, Petey explains he has "reintegration sickness" from reversing his severance. Petey tells Mark the purpose of the break room, which is used for mentally wearing down disobedient employees. Mark gives Petey shelter in his house. While taking a shower, Petey hallucinates and collapses.
3	3	"In Perpetuity"	Ben Stiller	Andrew Colville	February 25, 2022
Petey tells Mark that mysterious benefactors helped him undergo the reintegration procedure. While Mark is at work, his sister, Devon, and brother-in-law, Ricken, deliver the latter's self-help book, The You You Are, to his doorstep, which Cobel steals and takes to Lumon to check for hidden messages. As she searches Mark's house, Petey recognizes her and flees, suffering more hallucinations and eventually collapsing at a convenience store. At the office, Helly learns her resignation request sent to her outie has been denied. Mark thwarts her various attempts to smuggle other messages to her outie. To help Helly understand why she is working at Lumon, Irving suggests they show her the office's Perpetuity Wing, which documents the history of Lumon's founder, Kier Eagan, and his succeeding dynasty. After attempting another escape, Helly is taken to the break room, where Milchick forces her to repeatedly recite an apologetic passage. Near his shift's end, Mark finds a hand-drawn map of Lumon's hallways, left for him by Petey. After work, Mark follows ambulance traffic to the convenience store and witnesses Petey being carried away by paramedics. Mark rushes home to hide evidence of Petey's stay, but is interrupted when Petey's abandoned cell phone rings.
4	4	"The You You Are"	Aoife McArdle	Kari Drake	March 4, 2022
Mark stashes away Petey's phone, noticing several missed calls from the same blocked number. The next day, Irving visits O&D, where he grows closer to Burt. He discovers Ricken's book, left behind by Milchick. Mark keeps the book, despite promising to give it to management. Helly returns from the break room after being forced to apologize over a thousand times. Mark shreds Petey's map after it is found by Helly. Helly finds a paper cutter and threatens self-mutilation unless she is granted a recorded resignation request. However, her outie sends back a recording, firmly denying both the request and her innie's personhood. Later that night, Mark receives a news notification reporting that Petey has died. Mark and Cobel (as Mrs. Selvig) attend the funeral, during which Cobel secretly extracts Petey's severance chip. Irving discovers that O&D actually has at least seven employees, working in a massive unlabelled back room. Helly smuggles out an extension cord and hangs herself in an elevator.
5	5	"The Grim Barbarity of Optics and Design"	Aoife McArdle	Anna Ouyang Moench	March 11, 2022
Helly is injured by her suicide attempt, but ultimately survives; she returns to work three days later. Mark continues to read Ricken's book, which carries strong anti-establishment sentiments. Outside work, Mark visits Devon and Ricken at a birthing lodge, where Devon gives birth. When Helly returns, Cobel orders Ms. Casey to watch her closely, but Mark sneaks Helly out of MDR and reveals he has been recreating Petey's map. When Mark tries to convince Helly to help with recreating the map, she initially refuses, but eventually agrees. Burt admits to Irving and Dylan that he lied about the size of O&D due to MDR being seen as untrustworthy; they realize Lumon is pitting the departments against one another. Burt takes the two to O&D's back room and introduces them to his employees as friends.
6	6	"Hide and Seek"	Aoife McArdle	Amanda Overton	March 18, 2022
Lumon security chief Doug Graner informs Cobel that he has identified ex-employee Reghabi as responsible for Petey's reintegration. Irving and Burt admit their feelings to one another, but Irving admits he is not ready to commit to a relationship. Mark has Irving introduce MDR to O&D, where he calls for the departments to work together to uncover Lumon's secrets. However, Milchick finds them and sends Mark to the break room. Milchick later briefly awakens Dylan's innie inside his outie's home to locate a card Dylan stole from O&D, leading Dylan's innie to discover he has a son. Cobel (as Mrs. Selvig) gets close to Devon and Ricken by acting as their lactation consultant. Mark goes on a date with Alexa, Devon's midwife, to a concert by Petey's daughter's punk-rock band, and sings along to an anti-Lumon protest song. Later, Mark finally answers Petey's phone and is contacted by Reghabi to meet at a nearby university. Cobel orders a keycard-locked door to be installed at the entrance to MDR.
7	7	"Defiant Jazz"	Ben Stiller	Helen Leigh	March 25, 2022
While Mark is meeting with Reghabi, Graner enters the building, following a tip from campus security. Reghabi kills Graner and gives Mark his access card, telling him to take it to his innie. Milchick engages in a "Music Dance Experience" with the department, as a prize for Helly. Dylan refuses to participate and eventually attacks Milchick, enraged that he cannot know more about his child. After Milchick leaves, Dylan tells the rest of MDR about Lumon's ability to wake them up outside the severed floor, known as the "overtime contingency". The MDR team uses Graner's card to regain access to the hallways. Mark and Helly scheme to find the security office; inside, they find out how the overtime contingency is activated. Dylan offers to stay behind after-hours to wake the others up on the outside. Irving departs to O&D, worried about Burt's safety. Upon arrival, he discovers that Burt is retiring, and openly berates the non-severed Milchick for exploiting the severed employees. After work, Alexa visits a drunken Mark, who scares her off after ripping up a photo of Gemma. After she leaves, Mark reassembles the photo, revealing it to be Ms. Casey.
8	8	"What's for Dinner?"	Ben Stiller	Chris Black	April 1, 2022
Irving's outie lives alone in an apartment, where he paints identical images of a dark corridor. Helly reaches 100% on her data refinement file, thereby meeting MDR's quota for the quarter. After a final wellness session with Mark, Ms. Casey is ordered by Cobel to be sent back down to the "testing floor", whose entrance matches Irving's paintings. While MDR celebrates making its quota, Cobel is suspended by Lumon's board for withholding knowledge of Helly's suicide attempt, and her avocational activities as "Mrs. Selvig". The MDR team prepares for Dylan to remotely awaken them on the outside. Helly kisses Mark before departing. Mark's outie attends Ricken's book-reading party and tells "Mrs. Selvig" that he plans to quit Lumon. She encourages him to do so. Dylan receives a "waffle party" as a reward for meeting quota, in which he dons a Kier Eagan mask and sits within a replica of Kier's bedroom in the Perpetuity Wing while ritualistic and seductive dances are performed in front of him. Dylan leaves midway to access the security office and activates the overtime contingency to awaken Mark, Irving, and Helly's innies in the outside world.
9	9	"The We We Are"	Ben Stiller	Dan Erickson	April 8, 2022
Mark's innie awakens in Devon's home and finds himself hugging Mrs. Selvig. While excusing himself to find Devon, he calls Cobel by name, alerting her that the overtime contingency has been activated. Cobel calls Milchick to warn him. Mark privately reveals to Devon that he is his innie; Devon tells him of Gemma's death and learns that Mrs. Selvig is Mark's boss. Irving wakes up in his apartment, discovering his outie's paintings, and finds a map and employee directory which he uses to locate Burt. Helly wakes up at a Lumon gala, where she learns that her outie is Helena―the daughter of Lumon CEO Jame Eagan―who underwent severance as a publicity stunt. Cobel races to the gala and attempts to stop Helly from making a scheduled speech. Helly gets onstage and tells the crowd of the innies' subjugation and torment. Irving arrives at Burt's house only to find Burt is already in a relationship. Mark finds a photo showing Ms. Casey to be Gemma. He rushes to tell Devon, but is only able to say "she's alive" before Milchick tackles Dylan, deactivating the overtime contingency and reverting the three to their outies.

=== Season 2 (2025) ===
Episodes in season 2 were promoted as being released on Fridays globally from January 17, but were released in American time zones on the preceding Thursday evenings.

No. overall	No. in season	Title	Directed by	Written by	Original release date
10	1	"Hello, Ms. Cobel"	Ben Stiller	Dan Erickson	January 16, 2025
Mark reawakens on the severed floor in a panic, finding Ms. Casey's wellness room decommissioned, and his whole team replaced. Milchick, now running the severed floor, introduces Mark to new deputy manager Miss Huang—a child—and informs him that five months have passed since the "Macrodat Uprising", which made Mark's team the faces of "severance reform". Milchick says that while Mark's outie asked to return to Lumon, the other three refused. Mark sabotages his new team as a distraction to reach Lumon's board and request the other innies' return. The next time Mark wakes up on the severed floor, he reunites with Dylan, Irving, and Helly. The four are taken to a renovated Break Room, where Milchick promises better working conditions and offers the innies a choice to leave permanently or stay. Mark informs the group what he learned while outside, while Helly lies about her outie's identity. A distraught Irving nearly leaves over his heartbreak at Burt having a partner, but Dylan convinces him to stay. Milchick privately shows Dylan blueprints for an outie family visitation suite. Having all chosen to stay, the team resumes its work.
11	2	"Goodbye, Mrs. Selvig"	Sam Donovan	Mohamad El Masri	January 23, 2025
Following the Overtime Contingency, Milchick is tasked with damage control and fires both Irving and Dylan; Irving lies to Milchick about his whereabouts that night. Helena, accompanied by security chief Mr. Drummond, meets with Cobel and offers her a promotion as a reward for her loyalty, but Cobel is insulted at not being offered her old job back. Helena films an apology video passing off her outburst at the gala as the result of intoxication. Milchick attempts to convince Mark to return to work, but Mark decides to quit, much to the dismay of Devon, who is concerned that Gemma is alive. Dylan attempts to find a new job but is discriminated against for being severed. Helena insists that Mark must return to work to finish his latest file, "Cold Harbor"; Milchick convinces him to return by offering him a hefty pay raise and promises that the happiness his innie receives will trickle back to him. After hearing Mark's plea to the board, Milchick rehires Dylan and Irving, while the board decides to send Helena back to work. Mark runs into Cobel while returning home and demands answers about Gemma, but she angrily drives off.
12	3	"Who Is Alive?"	Ben Stiller	Wei-Ning Yu	January 30, 2025
Mark and Helly go to hand out missing-persons posters of Ms. Casey across the severed floor. The two stumble upon the Mammalians Nurturable department, led by a woman named Lorne; though initially hostile, the Mammalians promise not to hinder MDR's search for Ms. Casey. Irving takes a missing poster to O&D, where he runs into Felicia, who identifies his sketch of the dark hallway from his outie's paintings as the "Exports Hall". Dylan is granted a visitation with his outie's wife, Gretchen. Natalie approaches Ricken to discuss adapting The You You Are for innies. Cobel agrees to rejoin Lumon on the condition that she is rehired as Floor Manager. Helena instead suggests an impromptu meeting with the board, prompting a spooked Cobel to drive off. Mark and Devon attempt to burn an afterimage into his retinas to communicate with his innie; Reghabi interrupts Mark, telling him his strategy will not work, and that reintegration is the only way to send messages in and out of Lumon. Mark agrees to the procedure after Reghabi confirms his wife is alive. As they begin conducting the process in Mark's basement, Mark flashes between the present and his orientation on the severed floor.
13	4	"Woe's Hollow"	Ben Stiller	Anna Ouyang Moench	February 6, 2025
MDR find themselves in the outside world on a frozen lake. A prerecorded message from Milchick informs them that they are on an "Outdoor Retreat and Team-Building Occurrence" (ORTBO), and directs them to find the previously unrevealed fourth appendix to the Lumon handbook, written by Kier Eagan, by following the directions of strange doppelgängers of themselves. Upon taking the appendix to Woe's Hollow, a waterfall, they are greeted by Milchick and Miss Huang, who have set up a campsite. Helly is confronted by Irving about her suspicious account of her time during the Overtime Contingency. She retorts by claiming Irving is bitter about Burt's retirement, causing Irving to storm off. Helly and Mark have sex, after which Mark briefly hallucinates Gemma's head on Helly's body. Irving sleeps outside, experiencing strange dreams. The next morning, Irving again confronts Helly. To force her to admit she is a mole, he yells for Milchick and begins drowning Helly in Woe's Hollow. She finally relents and orders Milchick to revert her to her innie, revealing her to have been Helena undercover as Helly ever since MDR's return to work. Milchick then fires Irving and reverts him to his outie.
14	5	"Trojan's Horse"	Sam Donovan	Megan Ritchie	February 13, 2025
Following the ORTBO, a reluctant Helena is compelled to let her innie go back to working on the severed floor until Mark completes the Cold Harbor file. Milchick fulfills Dylan's demand for a funeral for Irving. During the ceremony, Dylan realizes that Irving's final words to him reference a Break Room poster. Behind it, he discovers a card with directions to the Exports Hall, but quickly hides it again. Helly learns that Ms. Casey is Mark's outie's wife, and Mark tells her he cannot trust her. Milchick undergoes his first performance review as department head, where Drummond admonishes his failed kindness reforms, demanding that the innies be treated "as what they really are". Milchick confronts Mark, revealing he knows that Mark and Helena had sex during the retreat. Ricken begins work on the Lumon edition of The You You Are, laden with company propaganda, to Devon's dismay. Irving's outie notices Burt watching him. Burt admits he has been following him since the Overtime Contingency and theorizes that they were romantically involved on the severed floor. He invites Irving to dinner with his husband, Fields. Mark, in a sudden flash to the severed floor while at home, sees Gemma alive as Ms. Casey.
15	6	"Attila"	Uta Briesewitz	Erin Wagoner	February 20, 2025
Dylan informs Mark and Helly about his discovery of Irving's instructions to reach the Exports Hall. Milchick takes time off to address the infractions in his performance review, leaving Miss Huang in charge. Mark confesses to Helly that he and Helena had sex during the ORTBO. Feeling that Helena stole this experience from her, Helly initiates sex with Mark. Gretchen visits Dylan's innie again and the two kiss. She later lies to outie Dylan that the visitation was cancelled. Burt and Fields have Irving visit for dinner, and an awkward conversation unfolds. Meanwhile, Drummond breaks into Irving's apartment and discovers his directory of Lumon employees. Reghabi tells Mark they must accelerate the reintegration process by surgically "flooding" his severance chip, despite the risk of hemorrhage. Mark initially refuses but later encounters Helena at a restaurant; he leaves shortly after and decides to proceed with the procedure. While talking to Devon right after the procedure, Mark suffers a seizure and collapses.
16	7	"Chikhai Bardo"	Jessica Lee Gagné	Dan Erickson & Mark Friedman	February 27, 2025
In flashbacks, Mark and Gemma meet at a blood drive. The two go on to have a loving marriage which is eventually marred by difficulties conceiving a child. After a miscarriage, Gemma and Mark visit a fertility clinic run by Lumon. In the present, Gemma lives on the testing floor at Lumon, where every day she visits multiple rooms (which share the names of the MDR files) that awaken a separate innie forced to endure a certain unpleasant experience, overseen by Dr. Mauer. After she leaves the rooms, Mauer interviews her about her memories and emotions from the experiences. Meanwhile, as Mark lies unconscious, Reghabi confirms to Devon that Gemma is alive, and tells her Mark is voluntarily reintegrating. Reghabi leaves when Devon suggests calling Cobel for help. On the testing floor, when Gemma tells Mauer she wants to leave, he lies by saying that Mark remarried and had a child. Gemma knocks Mauer unconscious and steals his keycard. She attempts to escape via the elevator to the severed floor, but reverts to Ms. Casey, and Milchick redirects her back down the elevator. Mark awakens with Devon beside him, still recalling memories of Gemma.
17	8	"Sweet Vitriol"	Ben Stiller	Adam Countee and K. C. Perry	March 6, 2025
Cobel arrives in Salt's Neck, the seaside town she grew up in. The Lumon ether factory that once supported it has closed, and much of the population is addicted to ether. Harmony visits a restaurant to find her old friend Hampton, an ether dealer, who secretly drives her to her mother's house. Harmony's mother Charlotte died after a long illness while Harmony was at a Lumon boarding school, leaving Harmony's aunt Sissy, a Lumon devotee, in charge of the home. Harmony barges into the house against Sissy's protests and falls asleep crying on Charlotte's old bed. Hampton finds her and they take ether. In the outdoor storeroom, Harmony finds her yearbook and her sketches of the severance procedure and chip, proving she was in fact the true inventor. Sissy attempts to burn the pages, but Harmony saves them and drives off in Hampton's truck as a car approaches the house. She answers a phone call from Devon who informs her about Mark's reintegration.
18	9	"The After Hours"	Uta Briesewitz	Dan Erickson	March 13, 2025
On the day of the Cold Harbor file's expected completion, Mark and Devon meet Cobel, who says Gemma will die after the file is completed. Mark calls in sick, promising Milchick he will come to work the next day. Gretchen confesses to outie Dylan about her romance with his innie, so he threatens to quit. She confides in innie Dylan about their fight and tearfully says goodbye. Heartbroken, Dylan submits a resignation form. Burt, who worked for Lumon transporting persons of interest, breaks into Irving's apartment and drives him to a train station. He buys Irving a ticket and says to never return. They share their feelings for each other, and Burt sees Irving off. Miss Huang completes her stint as deputy manager, and Milchick sends her away. Helly recovers the Exports Hall directions card and memorizes it, but Jame Eagan arrives at MDR. At night, Cobel and Devon sneak Mark into a severed cabin at the same birthing lodge where Devon had her child. Mark's innie then awakens in the cabin.
19	10	"Cold Harbor"	Ben Stiller	Dan Erickson	March 20, 2025
Through video recordings, Mark's outie asks his innie to rescue Gemma from the testing floor after he completes the Cold Harbor file; otherwise, Gemma will die. Mark's innie storms off after he realizes he is being asked to sacrifice himself and Helly. Dylan returns to read a letter from his outie deferring his resignation request. Mark arrives on the severed floor, completes Cold Harbor, and receives a celebration from Milchick and a marching band. Helly and Dylan trap Milchick in the MDR bathroom while Mark searches for the hallway to the testing floor. In the Cold Harbor room, Gemma is tasked with disassembling a crib. To Dr. Mauer's and Jame Eagan's delight, she responds without emotion. Drummond summons Lorne to sacrifice a goat, but discovers Mark attempting to break into the Exports Hall. He tries to kill Mark but is subdued by Lorne. Mark takes Drummond hostage, but accidentally kills him in the testing floor elevator during the transition to his outie. Mark finds Gemma and they escape to the severed floor, reverting to their innies. Mark guides Gemma through the exit door but chooses to return to Helly, and the two run through the hallways as an emergency alarm blares.

== Production ==
=== Development ===
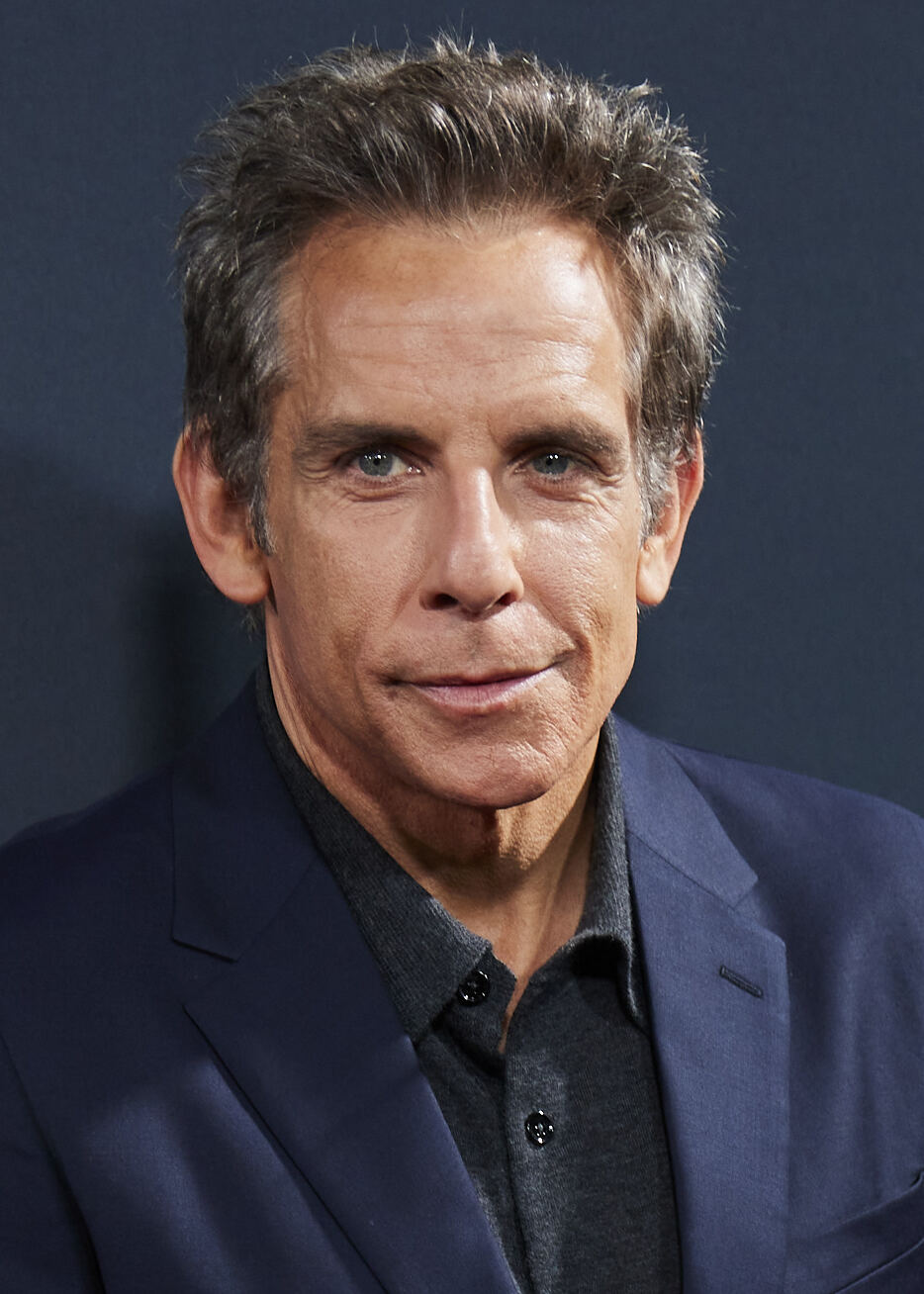
Ben Stiller is the primary director and one of the executive producers.

Erickson conceived of Severance during a period of depression, working an office job at a door factory after he had completed his master's degree in television writing. He found the job so monotonous that he wished he could "skip the eight hours of the workday, to disassociate and just get it over with".

Erickson submitted his pilot script to Ben Stiller's production company Red Hour Productions in 2015, and it was passed to Stiller by the development executive Jackie Cohn. Stiller read it at least five years before Severance premiered, and said the project was "the longest thing I've ever worked on." He said he enjoyed the story's contributions to the genre of workplace comedy. Erickson has described his earlier versions of the pilot as "weirder" and containing many stray elements with no backstory such as a disembodied pair of legs running by Mark, a charred floor with burnt desks, and a woman trapped in a glass cubicle. Erickson credits Stiller with grounding the show, saying "he felt that the concept was weird enough that you didn't have to throw a bunch of other Terry Gilliam-esque bells and whistles at it." According to Erickson, "Ben fell in love with the part of the show that was this weird human sadness of a person who would willingly do this to himself."

In November 2019, Apple TV+ gave Severance a series order, with Stiller directing and Scott in the leading role. Stiller was only attached to direct the pilot, but decided to direct more episodes as the series entered development. On April 6, 2022, Apple renewed the series for a second season. In April 2023, it was reported that Beau Willimon had been hired as an executive producer and writer for the second and potential third seasons. On March 21, 2025, shortly after the premiere of the season 2 finale, Apple announced the renewal of the series for a third season. The Writers Guild of America West database lists new showrunners Eli Jorne and Mary Laws alongside Erickson for the third season, replacing Chris Black and Mark Friedman, who showran the first two seasons alongside Erickson.

In February 2026, it was announced that Apple had acquired the rights and production oversight for the series from producing studio Fifth Season for an estimated $70 million. Apple's in-house Apple Studios will become the production company for the series starting with the third season, with Fifth Season remaining in an executive producer capacity. At that time, six scripts for the third season had been written, with one more being outlined and "a couple more" planned. Additionally, Apple believed the series would last for four seasons, which Deadline Hollywood reported was "a lock" and was one of the factors in Apple Studios buying the rights and their overall plans for the series. Deadline also reported that Erickson and Stiller were considering expanding the universe of the series with possible prequels, spinoffs, and foreign adaptations.

=== Writing ===
Media that influenced Severance include the Backrooms creepypasta, the 2013 video game The Stanley Parable, films including Office Space, The Truman Show, Being John Malkovich, and Eternal Sunshine of the Spotless Mind, the Black Mirror episode "White Christmas", and the comic strip Dilbert. Older influences include the existential hell in the 1944 Jean-Paul Sartre play No Exit and the totalitarian dystopia in the 1949 George Orwell novel Nineteen Eighty-Four. Aesthetically, the series was influenced by the films Brazil, Dark City, and Playtime. Erickson's siblings inspired some of the characters. In 2016, his screenplay for the pilot of Severance appeared on Blood List's survey results of the best unproduced genre screenplays.

Erickson said: "The same frustrations that led us to this moment as a country [United States] and as a world are the ones that I was feeling when I wrote this because I was working office jobs, and I was dealing with all these increasingly insane requests that are made of workers. This was born of that ... Employees are the ones who are expected to give and give and give, with the understanding that this is a family—you're doing this out of love, but then that is often not returned by the employers in any kind of a substantive way."

=== Casting ===
In January 2017, Stiller invited Adam Scott to star. Stiller and Scott had previously worked together in Stiller's 2013 movie The Secret Life of Walter Mitty, in which Scott coincidentally also played an office worker. Stiller intended to appear in the first season as a doctor character, but was later scrapped because Stiller didn't think it felt right and said he's happy to be off-camera.

In January 2020, Patricia Arquette, Britt Lower, Jen Tullock, and Zach Cherry were added to the cast. Tramell Tillman joined in February 2020, and John Turturro and Christopher Walken were added in November 2020. Dichen Lachman was cast in December 2020. Turturro said he recommended Walken for the role of Burt because he had known him for "a long time and I don't have to really act like we're friends".

On October 31, 2022, Gwendoline Christie, Bob Balaban, Merritt Wever, Alia Shawkat, Robby Benson, Stefano Carannante, Ólafur Darri Ólafsson, and John Noble were announced to have joined the cast for season two. Stiller offered former U.S. President Barack Obama a voice cameo role in the second season, but he declined; the role eventually went to Keanu Reeves.

=== Set design ===
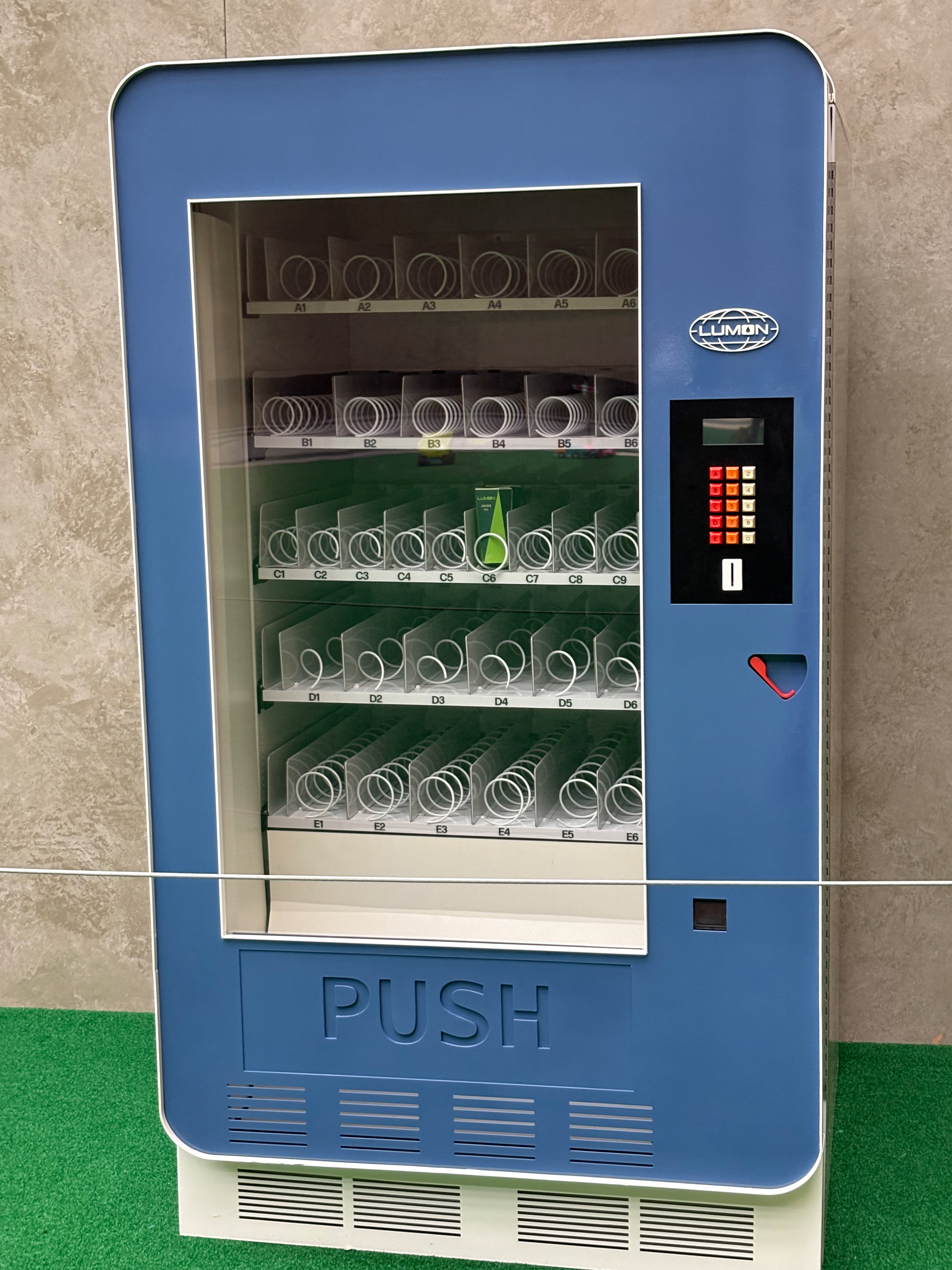
A Lumon-themed vending machine as seen in the show.

Production designer Jeremy Hindle blended corporate looks from the 1960s, 1970s, and 1980s for the show's distinctive look, and cited modernist architect Eero Saarinen as influential for the building design. This included the John Deere World Headquarters in Moline, Illinois, and the Bell Labs Holmdel Complex in New Jersey (the latter which served as both the exterior shots and the ground floor interiors for Lumon Industries), both buildings designed as "work designed to do work" according to Hindle. The set designs of Playtime also served as inspiration for the internal sets. The main sets for Severance were created on soundstages in The Bronx. One soundstage was used for the hallways within Lumon, using around 140 feet (43 m) of hallway that they would rearrange as necessary, along with special effects, to create the maze-like structure. Another soundstage used larger hallways that were used in latter episodes of the first season. A second soundstage was used for main rooms like the Macrodata Refinement Division. This space was designed to create the feeling of being trapped, using a large room (80 by 40 feet (24 m × 12 m)) with a low ceiling. Hindle also felt this room was meant to be a playroom for the newest Lumon hires, and gave it green carpeting in contrast with the whites to make it feel like grass. Other spaces within Lumon were inspired by the works of M.C. Escher or adorned with objects designed by the German industrial designer Dieter Rams. In a 2025 interview, Hindle described the show's aesthetic as having "a Dieter Rams look to it.”

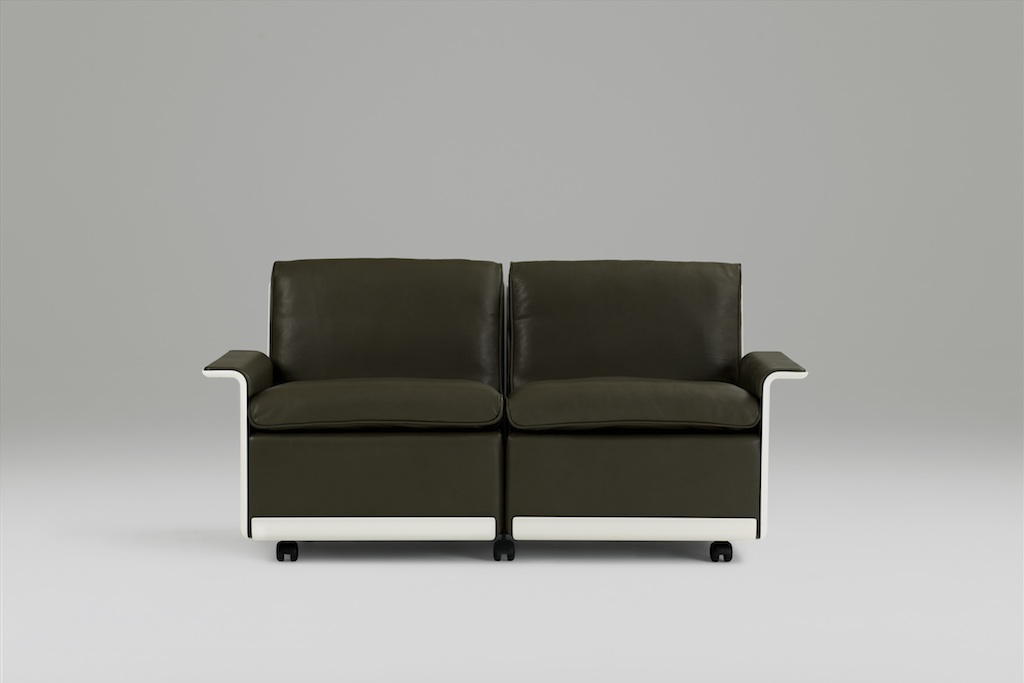
Dieter Rams designed couch similar to those used on the shows sets

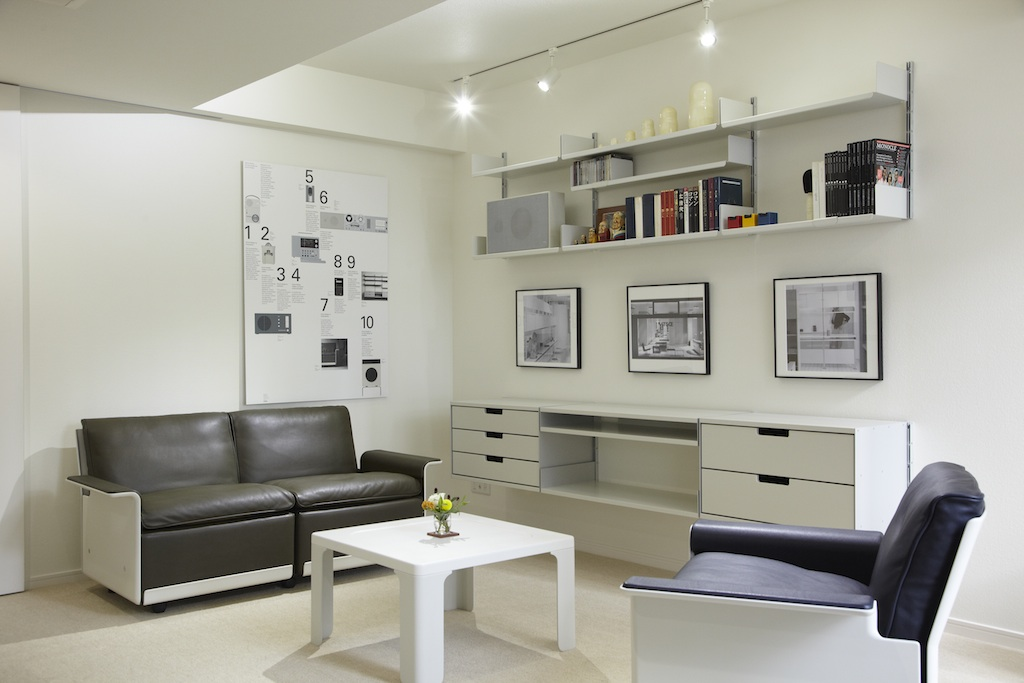
Dieter Rams's furniture seen in a Vitsœ showroom in Tokyo

Erickson said the mix of cars and technologies from different eras was meant to "give a slight sense of disorientation" and make Lumon "feel unmoored from time and space". To this end, the production team sourced an anachronistic collection of 400 cars, largely commonplace boxy vehicles from the 1980s and 1990s, all in relatively good condition. Each car, even in the far background, was intentionally placed to curate the retro science fiction aesthetic. Characters' vehicles, chosen to show more of who they are, include Mark's Volvo S90, Cobel's Volkswagen Rabbit, Helena's Lincoln Continental, and Milchick's Royal Enfield motorcycle. All the office equipment carries Lumon branding. The prop designers reconstructed old computers with functional trackball devices so the actors could perform the work presented on the show in order to get adjusted to the office setting. The computers lacked an escape key, as a metaphor for the lack of control the innies have while in Lumon's offices. The computer terminals were modeled from the Data General Dasher terminals from the 1970s and the keycaps were recreated by Signature Plastics, who also made the original keycaps for the 1970s Dasher terminals. The keycap set was re-released in 2025 under the name "SA Macrodata Refinement".

=== Filming ===
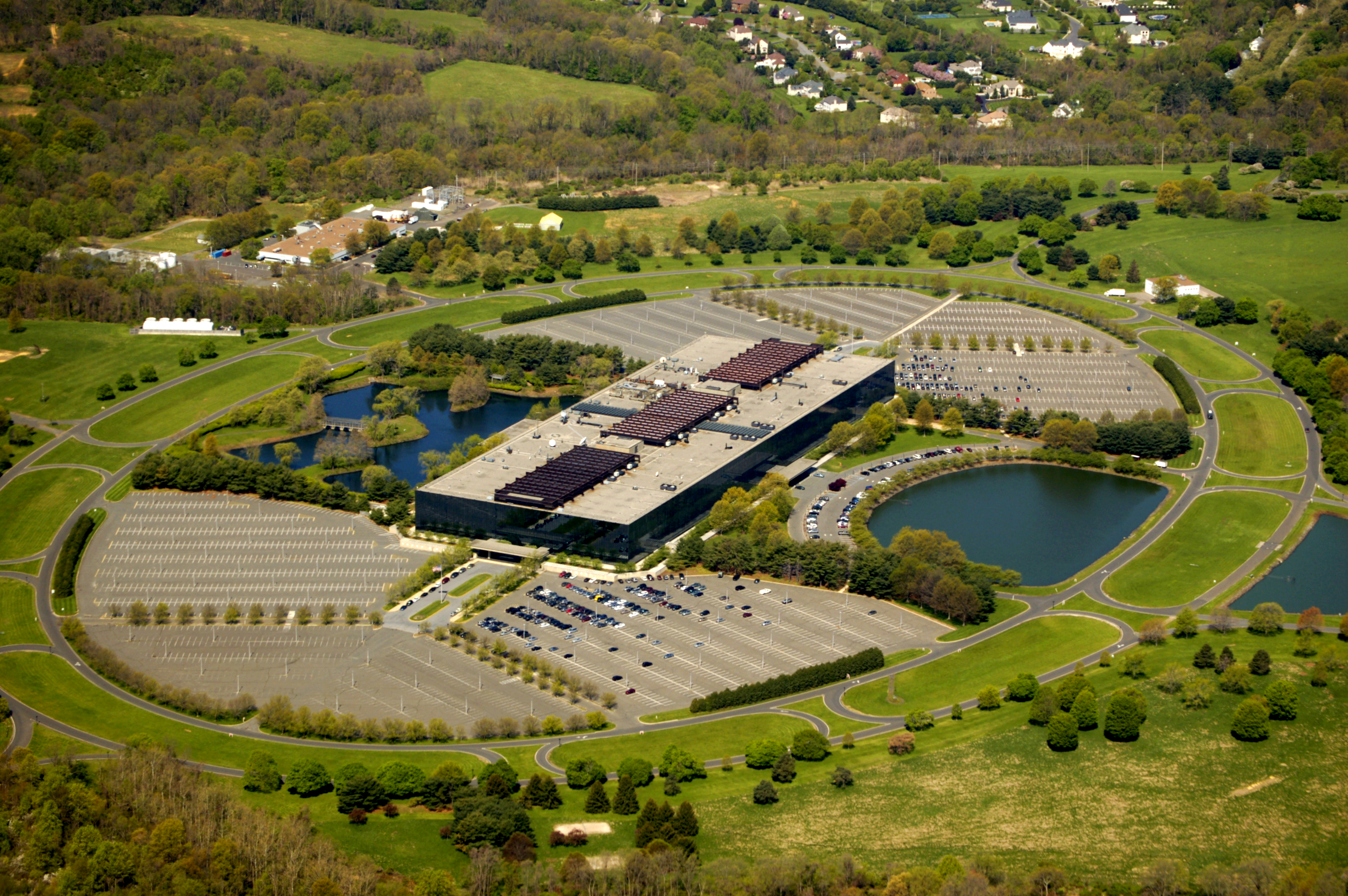
The Bell Labs Holmdel Complex in central New Jersey, U.S., stood in for the headquarters of Lumon Industries and has become a popular social media and tourist attraction.

The COVID-19 pandemic postponed the initial production start of March 2020. Principal photography for the first season started in New York City under the working title Tumwater on November 8, 2020. The opening scene of the show was shot on January 6, 2021. The series filmed for a few days in February in Nyack, New York for the homes of Mark and Cobel, and in Kingston and Beacon, New York in March. In April, filming moved to central New Jersey, mainly in the Bell Labs Holmdel Complex which stood in for Lumon HQ. Filming was scheduled to conclude on June 23, 2021.

The second season began filming on October 3, 2022, in New York City, and was set to wrap on May 12, 2023. However, on May 8, 2023, production of the season was shut down due to the 2023 Writers Guild of America strike. Production had resumed by May 13, 2023, with filming occurring in Newfoundland. Filming was later shut down again due to both the actors strike and the writers strike, but resumed on January 29, 2024, and wrapped on April 23, 2024.

Ahead of the third season, Fifth Season considered moving filming to Canada because of delayed tax credit payments from New York state, which put a financial strain on the studio. Following Apple acquiring the rights to the series, they were better able to bear the financial burden of the delayed payments and could keep the series filming in New York. Filming of the third season began in July 2026, with Kogonada as the new producing director.

=== Cinematography ===
As the primary cinematographer for season 1 and much of season 2, Jessica Lee Gagné was tasked with establishing the visual language of the show that would define the unsettling mood of Lumon Industries. She has cited Office by Lars Tunbjörk as her key source of inspiration, a photo book of claustrophobic or melancholic shots of the sterile and strange corporate workspaces of Stockholm, Tokyo, and New York in the late nineties.

In the “Innie” world of Severance, Gagné utilizes cool, fluorescent overhead lighting to heighten a sense of exposure and surveillance—a lighting choice that highlights the artificial and disconcerting nature of the workplace, and a color choice that typically connotes sensations of coldness and depression. The show also frequently frames camera shots through doorways or obscures much of the scene by filming partially behind walls or desk dividers, objects which emphasize an enclosed view and hem a character in by their surroundings. These are called frame within frame shots and not only does the strangeness or asymmetry make the shot more visually engaging, but it heightens the feeling of the characters’ imprisonment in their world.

In an interview explaining her creative choices, Gagné said that her "style is based on a kind of gritty realism," and she maintains these clean yet compelling compositions so that the environment doesn't become "overdone" and lose "its realness."

=== Main titles ===
The surrealistic visuals of the main title sequence were created using computer animation by designer Oliver Latta, also known as Extraweg, and typographer Teddy Blanks. The title sequences for seasons 1 and 2 won the Primetime Emmy for Outstanding Title Design in 2022 and 2025, respectively.

== Reception ==
=== Audience viewership ===
In 2025, Severance became the most watched series in the history of Apple TV+.

=== Critical response ===
Critical response of Severance
Season	Rotten Tomatoes	Metacritic
1	97% (117 reviews)	83 (36 reviews)
2	94% (227 reviews)	87 (46 reviews)

Both seasons of Severance have received critical acclaim. On the review aggregator website Rotten Tomatoes, the overall series holds an approval rating of 95%. Meanwhile, on Metacritic, which uses a weighted average, the overall series has received a score of 85 out of 100.

==== Season 1 ====
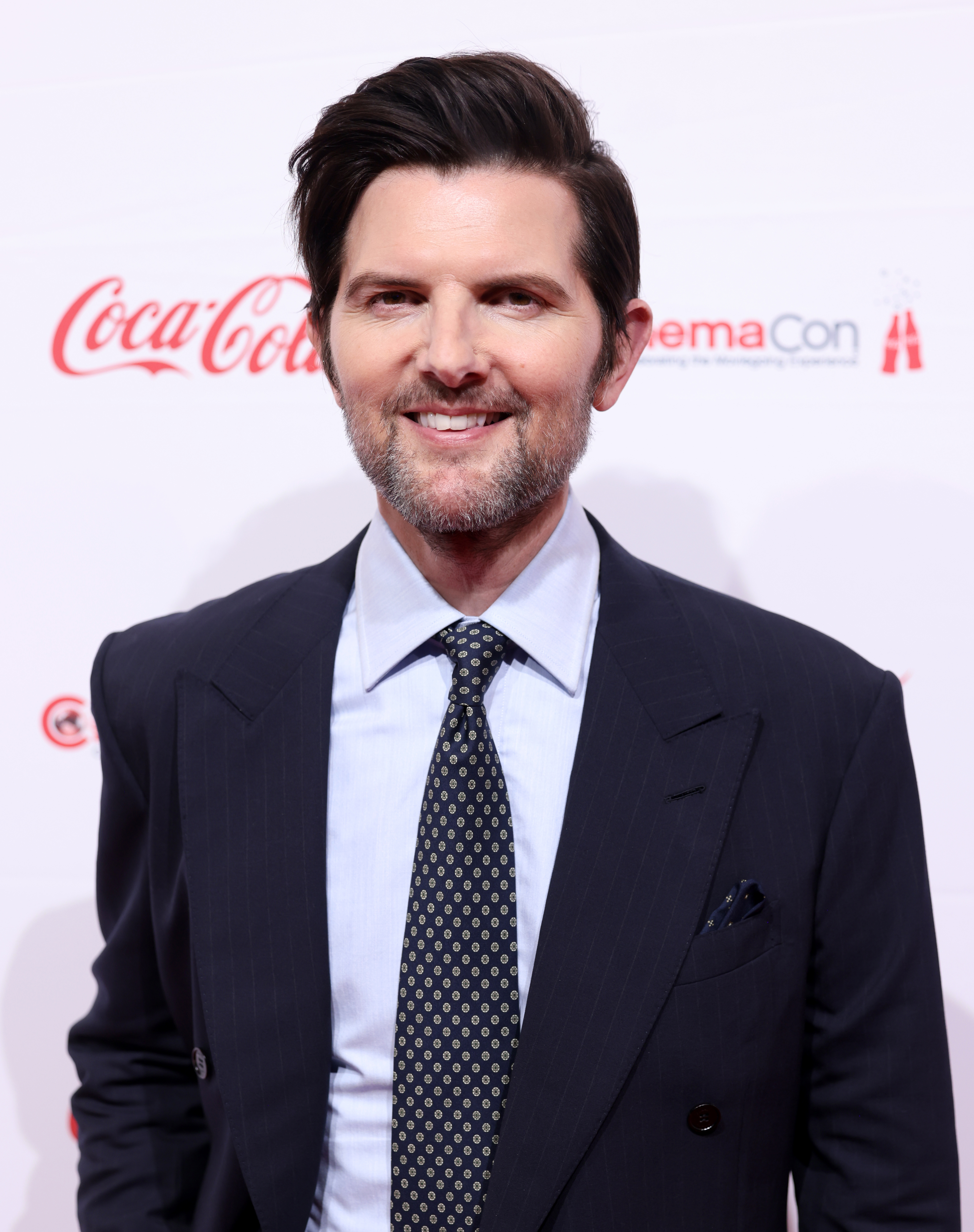
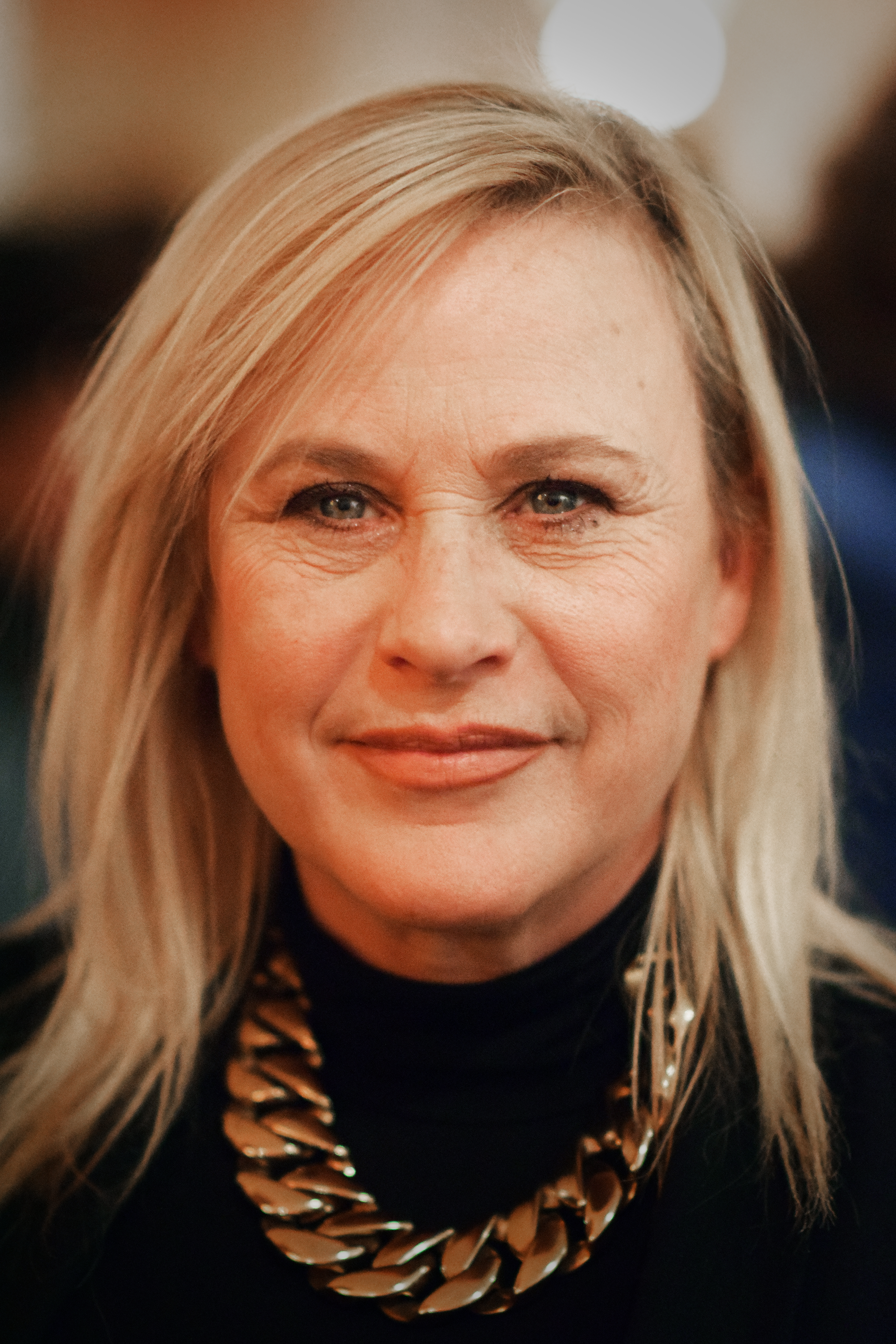
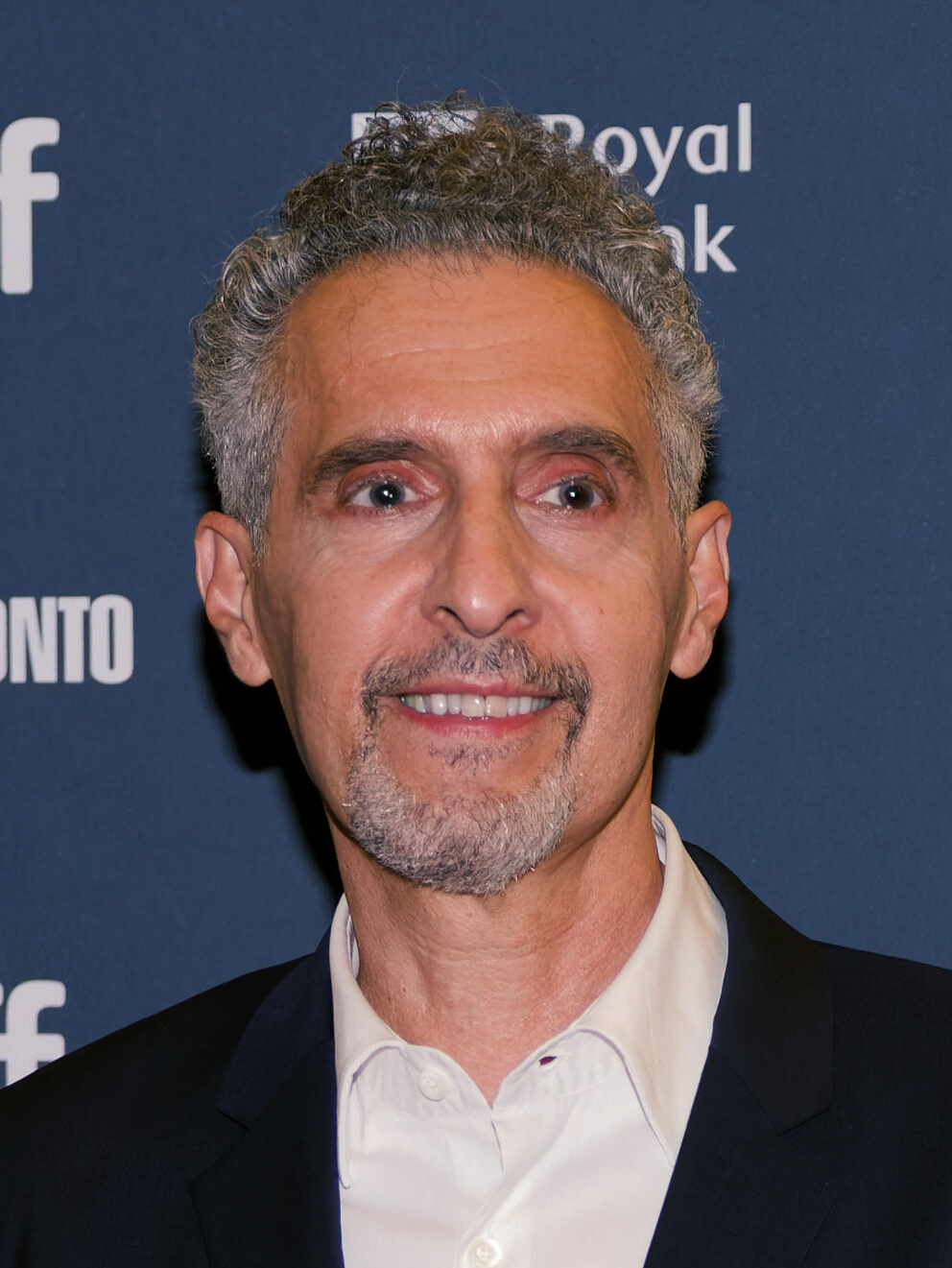
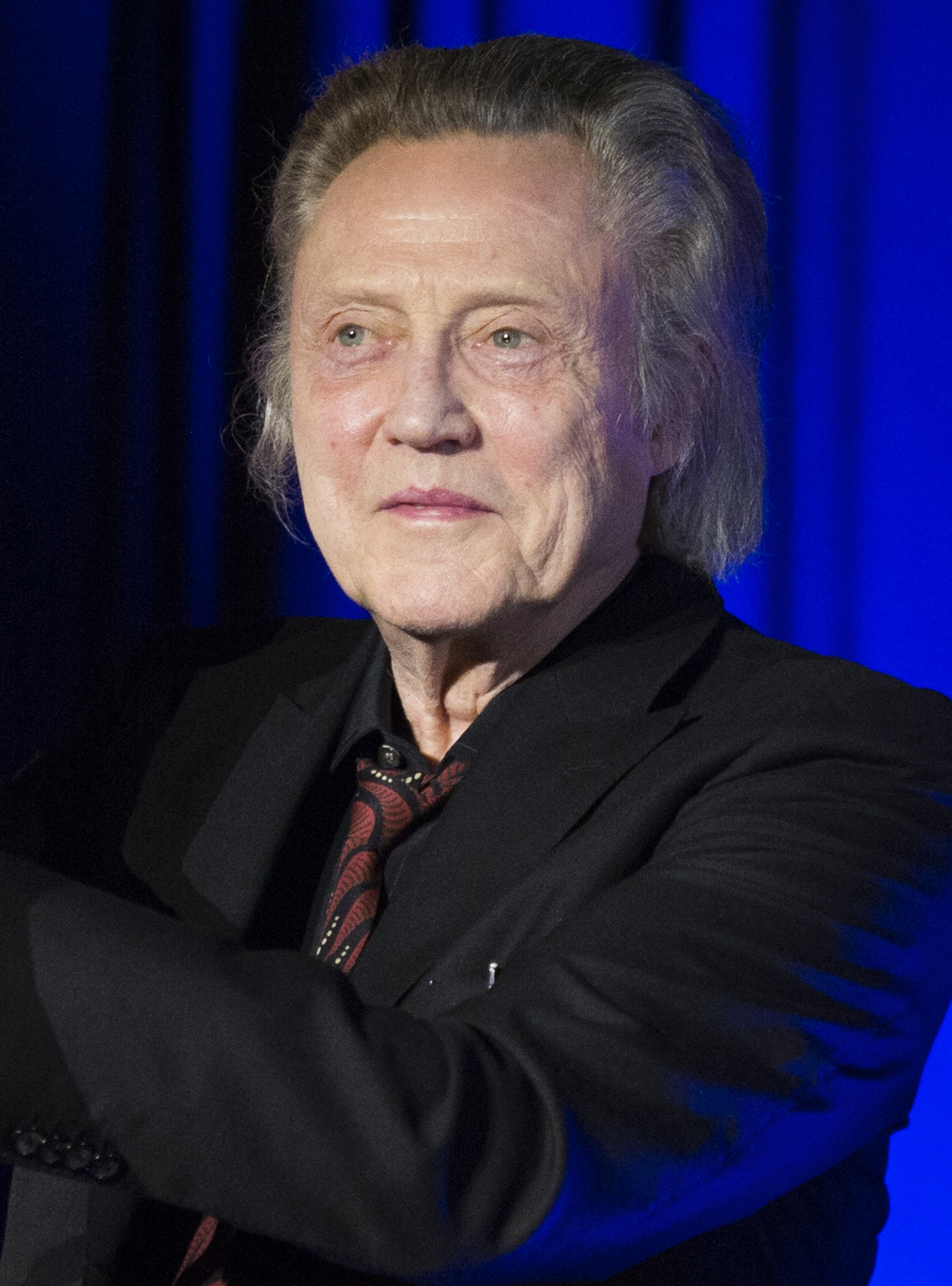
Adam Scott, Patricia Arquette, John Turturro and Christopher Walken (pictured) received critical acclaim for their performances in season one, with all earning Primetime Emmy Award nominations.

On Rotten Tomatoes, the first season of Severance has an approval rating of 97% based on 117 reviews with an average rating of 8.5/10. The website's consensus reads: "Audacious, mysterious, and bringing fresh insight into the perils of corporate drudgery, Severance is the complete package." Metacritic assigned a score of 83 out of 100 based on 36 critics, indicating "universal acclaim".

The series received a rating of five out of five from Lucy Mangan of The Guardian and Rachael Sigee of I, 4 out of 5 stars from Huw Fullerton of Radio Times, John Nugent of Empire, Alan Sepinwall of Rolling Stone and Anita Singh of The Telegraph, and 3.5 out of 4 stars from Patrick Ryan of USA Today. In her review, Mangan praised Stiller's direction, the writing, and the performances of the cast (particularly those of Arquette, Turturro, Walken, and Tillman). Sigee also praised the performances, especially Scott's, Arquette's, Turturro's and Walken's, and wrote, "Severance moves slowly but surely, allowing time to absorb both the impressive world-building and stunning visuals, [...] [and] its breathtaking cinematography and design. With an exceptional cast [...], this is an original, weird, thought-provoking and beautifully crafted story that asks just how much of ourselves we should give over to our jobs." Fullerton also praised Scott's performance and called the series "an impressive creation". Nugent praised the direction, performances of Scott, Arquette, Turturro and Walken, and chemistry between the latter two. Sepinwall also praised Stiller's direction and the cast's performances (most notably those of Scott, Turturro, Walken, Lower and Tillman), in addition to the production design, tone, and season finale.

Grading the series an "A", Carly Lane of Collider wrote, "the most engrossing element of Severance is the many mysteries it presents, wrapped up in silent overarching questions of philosophy, morality, and free will versus choice, and as the series demonstrates, some of those questions aren't so easily solved, but some issues aren't as black-and-white as initially presented either." Also grading it an "A", Ben Travers of IndieWire wrote, "Whether you invest in the allegory, character arcs, or both, 'Severance' hits its marks. [...] Erickson and his writing staff deserve a ton of credit. The season plays out cleanly and efficiently; episodes range from nearly 60 minutes to a crisp 40; cliffhangers abound, but they're earned. [...] This is serialized storytelling that knows how to make the most of its episodic format." Stephen Robinson of The A.V. Club gave it an "A−" grade and praised Stiller's direction and the cast, with the performances of Lower, Scott, Tillman, Turturro, Walken, Tullock and Cherry singled out. For Entertainment Weekly, Kristen Baldwin graded it a "B+" and highlighted the performances of Scott, Lower and Tillman, writing, "Scott is a superb fit for Severance's central everyman, [...] Lower brings an effective vulnerability to the acerbic Helly, and Tramell Tillman is an absolute force of charisma as Milchick."

Giving the series a score of nine out of ten, Samantha Nelson of IGN wrote, "Severance [...] uses a clever premise and excellent cast to set up an intriguing mystery that leaves plenty of room for the characters to evolve." Writing for Paste, Shane Ryan gave it an 8.1 out of 10 and praised the performances of Scott, Arquette and Tillman as well as Stiller and McArdle's direction. Kyle Mullin of Under the Radar gave it eight out of ten and said, "Severance's writer/creator Dan Erickson is another newcomer who pens scenes with veteran-level aplomb. Every scene is a Golden Age of TV gem in its own right. But Severance's dramatic heart resides at the workplace, where it also becomes a white-knuckle thriller. This is where director Ben Stiller especially shines, training his lens and setting the scenes [...]. He certainly brings the best out of his cast."

The American Film Institute named it one of the ten best television programs of the year.

The first season was also recognized with The ReFrame Stamp for hiring people of underrepresented gender identities, and of color.

==== Season 2 ====
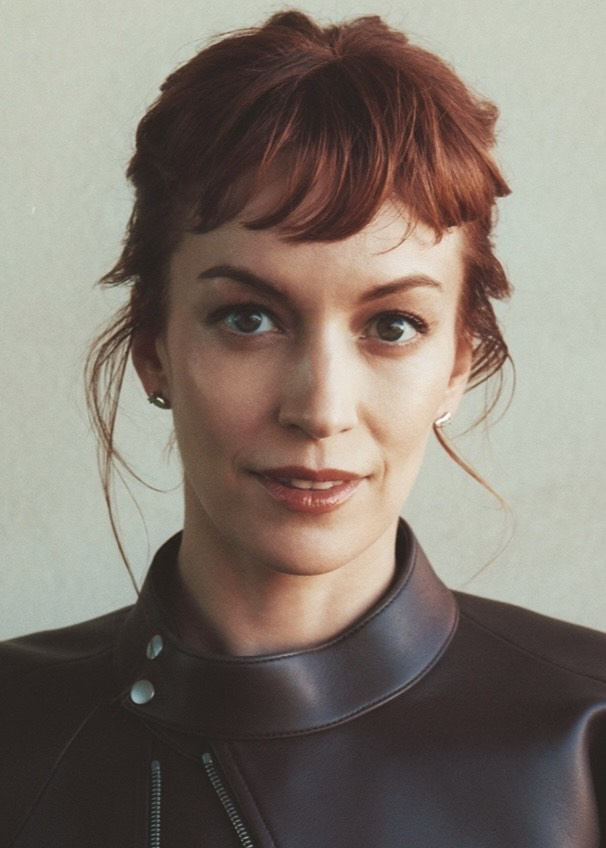
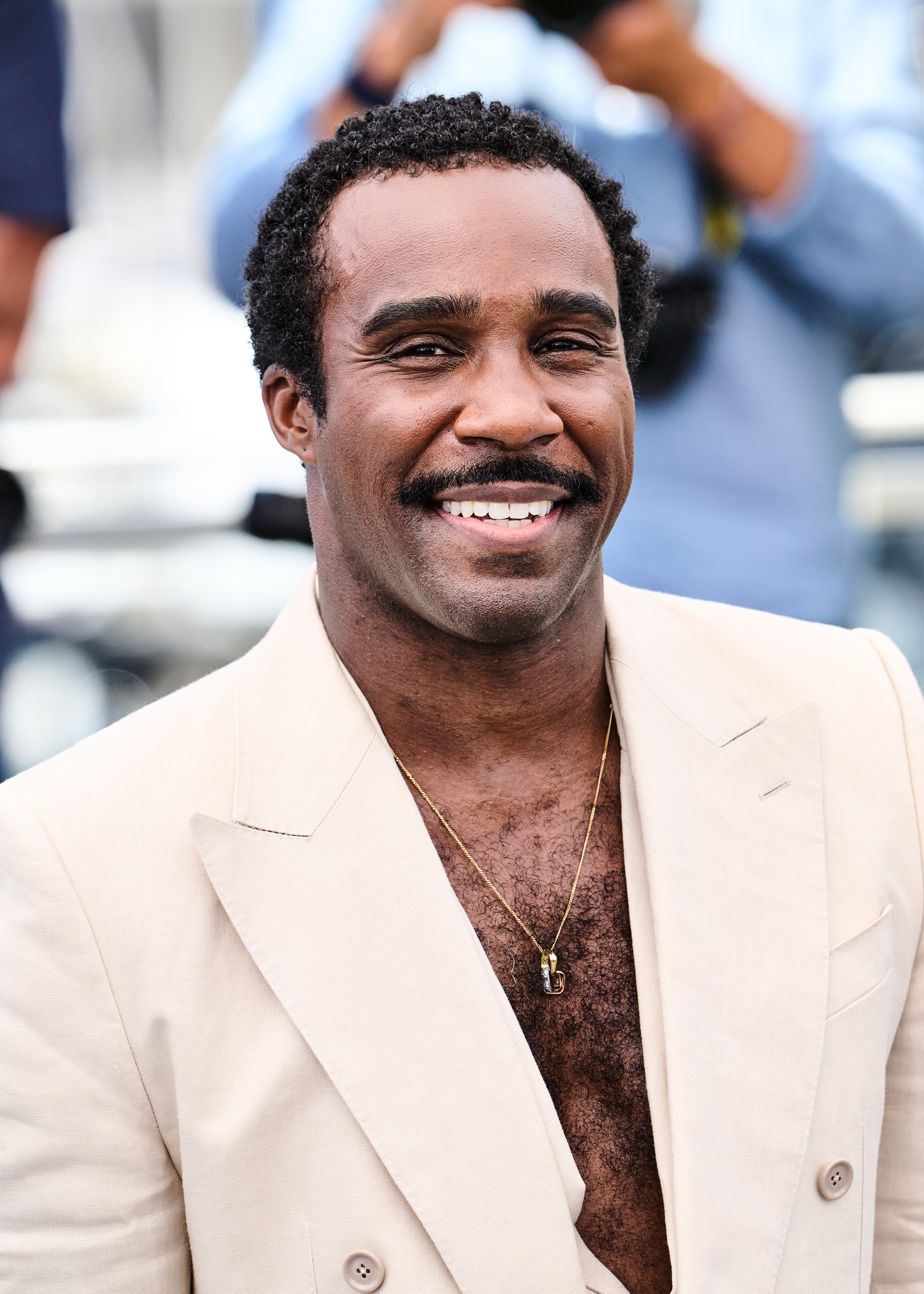
Britt Lower and Tramell Tillman also received critical acclaim for their performances in season two, and won the Emmys for Outstanding Lead Actress in a Drama Series and Outstanding Supporting Actor in a Drama Series respectively.

The second season has an approval rating of 94% based on 227 reviews with an average rating of 8.9/10 on Rotten Tomatoes. The website's consensus reads: "Masterfully managing its two halves of adroit character study and surreal nightmare, Severance's long-awaited sophomore season makes cognitive dissonance a mind-melting pleasure." Metacritic assigned a score of 87 out of 100 based on 46 critics, indicating "universal acclaim".

Writing for Variety, Alison Herman awarded the second season with a perfect rating, noting: "Season 2 fulfills this sine qua non with deceptive ease. Real-time viewers have had their patience strained; future binge-watchers will barely notice a blip." John Nugent of Empire gave season two 4 stars out of 5, while stating: "After a storming Season One, Season Two expands and deepens the original mysteries while opening up new ones. Sharply made and skilfully executed, the employee benefits are there if you stay with it."

=== Critics' top ten list ===
2022
- No. 1 Decider
- No. 1 Little White Lies
- No. 1 Vulture (Jen Chaney)
- No. 2 The A.V. Club
- No. 2 Empire
- No. 2 Exclaim!
- No. 2 IndieWire (Ben Travers)
- No. 2 ScreenCrush
- No. 2 TV Guide
- No. 2 TV Insider
- No. 3 Consequence
- No. 3 Entertainment.ie
- No. 3 Polygon
- No. 3 Time
- No. 4 The Boston Globe
- No. 4 The Mary Sue
- No. 4 People
- No. 4 Uproxx
- No. 4 Vulture (Roxana Hadadi)
- No. 5 Adweek
- No. 5 BuddyTV
- No. 5 Rolling Stone
- No. 5 Vulture (Kathryn VanArendonk)
- No. 6 TVLine
- No. 6 NME
- No. 7 The Playlist
- No. 9 Entertainment Weekly (Kristen Baldwin)
- No. 9 The Hollywood Reporter (Angie Han)
- No. 9 Primetimer
- No. 9 The Ringer
- No. 10 Slant
- – CBC Arts
- – The Economist
- – IndieWire (Proma Khosla – new shows only)
- – Lifehacker
- – Los Angeles Times (Lorraine Ali)
- – Nerdist
- – The New York Times (James Poniewozik)

=== Accolades ===
For its first season, the series received 7 major nominations for the 74th Primetime Emmy Awards, with an additional 7 nominations for the 74th Primetime Creative Arts Emmy Awards. Nominations included Outstanding Drama Series, Adam Scott for Outstanding Lead Actor in a Drama Series, John Turturro and Christopher Walken for Outstanding Supporting Actor in a Drama Series, Patricia Arquette for Outstanding Supporting Actress in a Drama Series, Ben Stiller for Outstanding Directing for a Drama Series, and Dan Erickson for Outstanding Writing for a Drama Series. It won two awards at the Creative Arts Emmy Awards: Outstanding Title Design and Outstanding Music Composition for a Series (Original Dramatic Score).

For its second season, the series received 10 major nominations for the 77th Primetime Emmy Awards, with an additional 17 nominations for the 77th Primetime Creative Arts Emmy Awards, making it the most-nominated series at both ceremonies. It won for three acting awards: Britt Lower for Outstanding Lead Actress in a Drama Series, Tramell Tillman for Outstanding Supporting Actor in a Drama Series and Merritt Wever for Outstanding Guest Actress in a Drama Series; it won five additional awards in technical categories, including winning Outstanding Title Design again. Notable nominations included Outstanding Drama Series, Adam Scott for Outstanding Lead Actor in a Drama Series, Zach Cherry and John Turturro for Outstanding Supporting Actor in a Drama Series, Jessica Lee Gagné and Ben Stiller for Outstanding Directing for a Drama Series, and Dan Erickson for Outstanding Writing for a Drama Series.

== Marketing ==
The second season was teased during the Apple Event on September 7, 2022, which featured Helly (Britt Lower). The first footage from season 2 was released on June 10, 2024, as part of a promo for upcoming Apple TV+ programming.

On July 9, 2024, a post on the Apple TV+ account on social media platform X teased an announcement about season 2. In the video, a light blinks the word "tomorrow" in Morse code. The next day on July 10, Apple TV+ announced that season 2 would debut on January 17, 2025. The first trailer for season 2 was released on October 23, 2024.

External videos
- Video by Apple TV+
- Severance — Inside the Grand Central Terminal Pop-Up | Apple TV+

On January 14, 2025, three days before the premiere of the second season, Apple TV+ recreated the show's 'Macrodata Refinement' office inside a glass box at Grand Central Terminal. Actors Scott, Cherry, Arquette, Lower, and Tillman entered the glass box and behaved as though they were working their respective jobs at Lumon Industries for about two and a half hours. The pop-up's uniqueness and the cast's dedication generated largely favorable responses from the public.

On March 21, 2025, IKEA India and Australia posted the same advertisement promoting office supplies replicating a similar set up to the Macrodata Refinement office. The tagline pokes fun at the "mysterious and important work" joke that is told by the office workers.

On March 26, 2025, some cast members appeared at Tower Bridge in London to celebrate the renewal of season 3. Cast members included Adam Scott, Britt Lower, Tramell Tillman, Zach Cherry, and Gwendoline Christie. At the event were balloons with Adam Scott's face. On the same day, Apple updated their computer section on their website to include the Lumon Terminal Pro. However, the item was not actually for sale but served as marketing to promote both the show and the Apple TV+ service.

== Release ==
The official release dates of second-season episodes were on Fridays, but Apple TV+ released episodes the prior Thursday at 9:00 pm ET.

=== Home media ===
The first season was released in the UK on Blu-ray and DVD on December 2, 2024, in Australia on December 4, 2024, and in the United States on December 17, 2024.

== Other media ==
An epistolary novel related to the series, Severance: The Lexington Letter, was released by Apple Books purporting to be a "tell-all" exposé of sinister occurrences at Lumon Corporation, in the form of a dialogue between former Lumon employee Margeret "Peg" Kincaid and her innie (work self), sent as a letter to a Topeka newsletter.

A fictional self-help book from the series, The You You Are, was released by Apple Books as an e-book and an audiobook, the latter read by the actor Michael Chernus in his role as Ricken Hale.

The official Severance podcast premiered in January 2025, hosted by Ben Stiller and Adam Scott. Each episode of the podcast recaps an episode of the series, and features interviews with an actor, crew member, or fan of the show.

== See also ==
- Cypher, a 2002 thriller with similar themes of memory erasure and separate identities in a mysterious workplace setting
- Drug-induced amnesia § In popular culture
- My Own Worst Enemy, a 2008 TV series about a secret agent and his cover, who has no knowledge of his own double life
- Paycheck, a 1952 novelette by Philip Dick, that explores a theme of erasing memory of the time spent on a contract
