= Good News About Hell =

- Severance episode
- Mark Scout (Adam Scott) sits down at his desk at the start of his shift at Lumon.
- Episode no.: Season 1 Episode 1
- Directed by: Ben Stiller
- Written by: Dan Erickson
- Cinematography by: Jessica Lee Gagné
- Editing by: Geoffrey Richman
- Original release date: February 18, 2022
- Running time: 57 minutes

Guest appearances
- Michael Cumpsty as Doug Graner; Yul Vazquez as Peter "Petey" Kilmer

Episode chronology
← Previous —	Next → "Half Loop"

"Good News About Hell" is the series premiere of the American science fiction psychological thriller television series Severance. The episode was written by series creator Dan Erickson, and directed by executive producer Ben Stiller. It was released on Apple TV+ on February 18, 2022.

The series follows employees of Lumon Industries, a biotechnology corporation that uses a medical procedure called "severance" to separate the memories of their employees: at work, Lumon employees, called "innies", can't remember anything outside of work. Outside work, Lumon employees, called "outies", can't remember anything about work. As a result, innies and outies experience two different lives, with distinct personalities and agendas.

The episode received highly positive reviews from critics, who praised the premise, production values, performances, and intrigue. Adam Scott received a nomination for Outstanding Lead Actor in a Drama Series at the 74th Primetime Emmy Awards.

== Plot ==
A woman (Britt Lower) awakens on a table in a locked conference room. A voice talks with her through an intercom device, asking her to take part in a survey. After failing to open the door, she reluctantly agrees. The woman is unable to recall her name or home state, and is confused when she is asked about a "Mr. Eagan." Satisfied with the results, the man speaking opens the door, telling her she got a perfect score.

After crying in a parking lot, Mark Scout (Adam Scott) composes himself and goes to work at Lumon Industries. After changing clothing, he enters an elevator, where he suddenly gains a new and more confident attitude upon descending. Mark walks through an elaborate series of corridors until he arrives at his cubicle in the Macrodata Refinement (MDR) division, chatting with his co-workers Dylan G. (Zach Cherry) and Irving B. (John Turturro). Now addressed as "Mark S.", he is called by his superior, Mr. Milchick (Tramell Tillman), who takes him to manager Harmony Cobel (Patricia Arquette). The two inform Mark that he has been promoted to department chief after his co-worker Petey abruptly left Lumon. To start his duties, Mark is tasked to interview a new applicant: the woman from the prologue.

Mark tells the woman that her name is Helly R., and that she is applying for a job at the "severed floor" of the company. He explains that he was in her position when he started, and that the interviewer, Petey, would end up becoming his best friend. Helly is allowed to leave after asking three times to do so but finds that she returns to the same hallway when she crosses the exit door. Mark gives her a tour of the severed floor, telling her she is Petey's replacement. Mark takes her to Cobel, who gives her a video disc that will serve as the final step in her orientation. The video, which consists of Helly reading statements directly to a camera, reveals that she willingly underwent the "severance" procedure, which split her memories to create a version of herself that will only exist inside the workplace.

When the shift is over, Mark leaves the building, returning to his "outside" self. He is visited by his pregnant sister, Devon (Jen Tullock), who takes him to a "dinnerless dinner party" with her eccentric husband Ricken (Michael Chernus) and his friends. Their conversation reveals that Mark is still grieving over the death of his wife Gemma and that he has been working at Lumon for two years. The other dinner guests are aware of the severance procedure and remain polarized over its use. Staying over at Devon's house for the night, Mark is disturbed when he notices a man lurking outside the house.

Later, at a diner, Mark has a phone conversation with his neighbor, Mrs. Selvig. He is interrupted by the man from the night before, who introduces himself as Petey (Yul Vazquez). Mark is unable to recognize him and is surprised when Petey reveals that he managed to reverse the severance procedure. Petey knows he is being followed and wants Mark to help him with anything, telling him they were best friends at work. Before leaving, he gives Mark an envelope with an address, telling him to go there if he wants to know more about what goes on at Lumon. Returning home, Mark has a conversation with Mrs. Selvig, who is revealed to be Cobel.

== Development ==
The episode was written by series creator Dan Erickson, and directed by executive producer Ben Stiller.

Dan Erickson came up with the idea of the non-dinner dinner party as a "pretentious, contrarian thing that people in this world might choose to do, to focus on the social element of dinner by forgoing the actual food."

== Reception ==
"Good News About Hell" received highly positive reviews from critics. Matt Schimkowitz of The A.V. Club gave the episode an "A" and wrote, "The Apple TV+ drama has an extremely purposeful premiere. It's just bizarre and relatable enough. No one has crash-landed on an island in 'Good News About Hell', but Mark appears marooned in the interiors of Lumon Industries."

Erin Qualey of Vulture gave the episode a 4 star rating out of 5 and wrote, "One of the first great shows of 2022, Severance is a new series from Apple TV+, a streamer that is becoming known for taking risks on unique and wild narratives. Severance comes from the mind of writer Dan Erickson, and six of the nine episodes are deftly directed by Ben Stiller. With an all-star cast that boasts dynamite performances from Patricia Arquette, Christopher Walken, John Turturro, Britt Lower, and Adam Scott – playing not one but two versions of his character – the series is worth watching for its pedigree alone. Thankfully, it also has a gripping and cerebral plot." Oliver VanDervoort of Game Rant wrote, "One of the things that makes Severance so good right at the offset is that the viewer never really feels very comfortable inside the world of this Apple TV+ series. Director Ben Stiller has made it clear that there is nothing normal about the Severance procedure or a company that is asking its employees to undergo something like this. Even before things take a turn, it becomes quite clear that things just aren't right."

Mary Littlejohn of TV Fanatic gave the episode a 3 star rating out of 5 and wrote, "Episode 1 is too long with pacing issues that almost seem like Stiller is trolling the audience into experiencing the monotony firsthand. There is a sequence where Mark walks down seemingly a endless hallway for 90 seconds. It feels longer." Breeze Riley of Telltale TV gave the episode a 4.5 star rating out of 5 and wrote, "The question of why someone would choose to sever their life and the ethics of that decision would be enough to drive the conflict of a series. It's the secret of what the severance process is hiding for Lumon that makes Severance into a thrilling mystery."

=== Awards and accolades ===
Adam Scott submitted the episode to support his nomination for Outstanding Lead Actor in a Drama Series at the 74th Primetime Emmy Awards. He lost to Lee Jung-jae for Squid Game.
