= Sarah Bock =

American actress

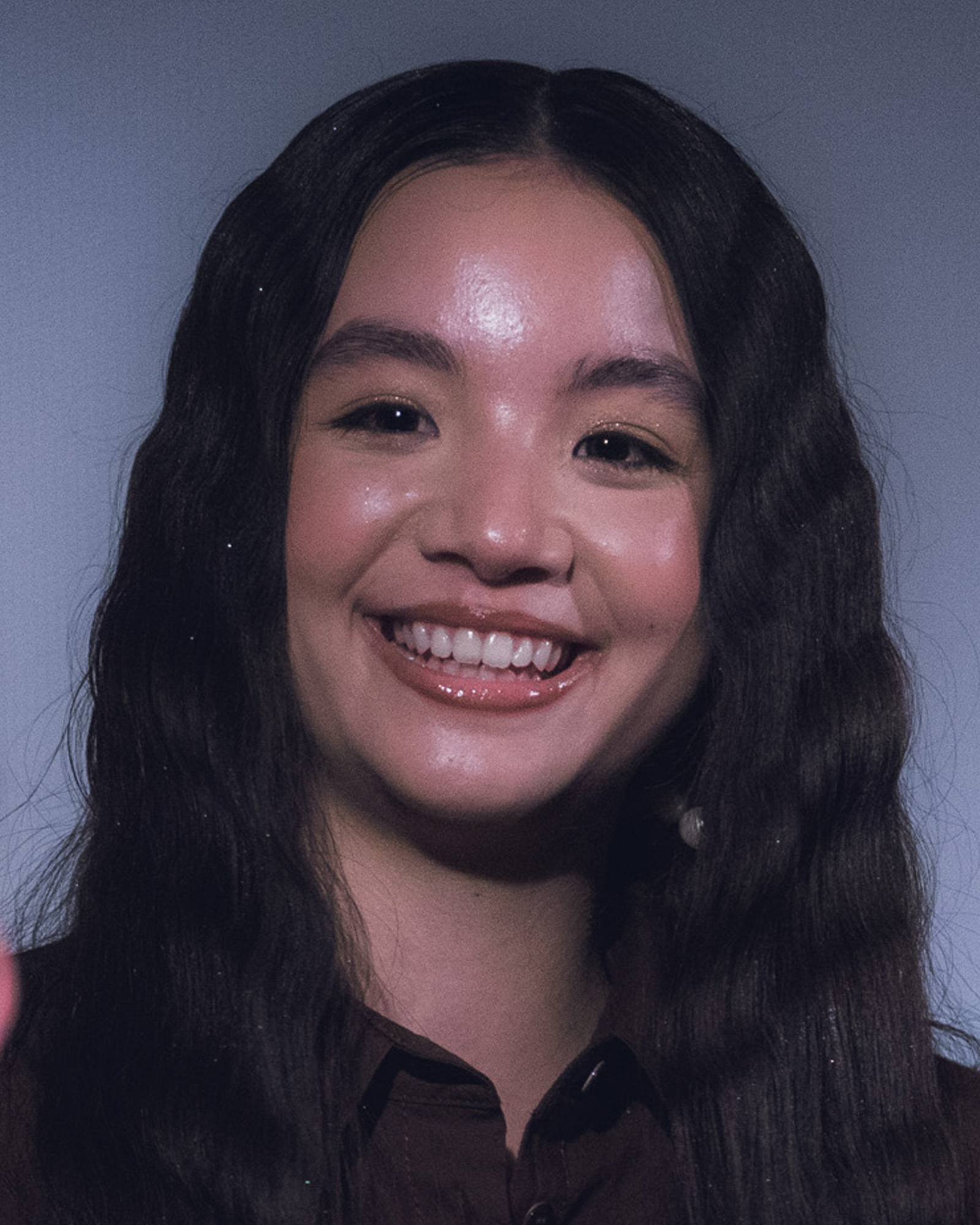
- Bock in 2025
- Born: August 15, 2006 (age 20)
- Education: Northwestern University
- Occupation: Actress

Sarah Bock (born 15 August 2006) is an American actress. She is best known for her role in the Apple TV+ sci-fi series Severance as Miss Huang.

== Early life and education ==
Bock first lived in Raleigh, North Carolina and moved to Cary when she was eight. Through middle and high school, Bock got more involved in professional acting; a trip to New York City to see Matilda the Musical on Broadway at the age of 12 had inspired her to become an actress.

Bock is currently a student at Northwestern University as a double major in psychology and drama, with a concentration in theater. Britt Lower, a 2008 alumna of Northwestern University who portrays Helly R. in Severance, encouraged her to attend.

== Career ==
Bock began acting at age five when her mother signed her up for a Winnie the Pooh musical at a children's theater. At the age of 12, she professionally debuted in the North Carolina Theatre production of Annie in 2019. Additionally, she sang a new rendition of "Baby Shark" after getting cast as a voice actress for the Pinkfong Company. During her first year at Northwestern University, Bock starred in a community performance of Seussical. She has also appeared in the Hulu film Bruiser. In addition to acting, Bock also sings and dances.

In January 2025, Bock, at the age of 18, was introduced in Severance's second season as Miss Huang. Bock had auditioned for the role in 2022 when she was 15. Executive producer and director Ben Stiller praised her performance on the show stating: "This wonderful young actress came in and auditioned, and I was just blown away by her. She's got such poise and such intelligence and such sensitivity, and yet also has the ability to put forth this imposing facade, too. She's just been a gift to the show. I love her."

== Filmography ==
=== Film ===
Year	Title	Role	Notes
2022	Bruiser	Mia	

=== Television ===
Year	Title	Role	Notes
2025	Severance	Miss Huang	Main role, 10 episodes
2026	Buffy the Vampire Slayer: New Sunnydale	Gracie	Unaired TV Pilot

=== Theater ===
Year	Title	Role	Venue
2019	Annie	Kate	North Carolina Theatre
2024	Among the Dead	Ana Woods	Northwestern University

== Awards and nominations ==
Award	Year	Category	Nominated work	Result	Ref.
Actor Awards	2026	Outstanding Performance by an Ensemble in a Drama Series	Severance	Nominated	
