= What's for Dinner? (Severance) =

- Severance episode
- The Waffle Party held for Dylan
- Episode no.: Season 1 Episode 8
- Directed by: Ben Stiller
- Written by: Chris Black
- Cinematography by: Jessica Lee Gagné
- Editing by: Gershon Hinkson; Geoffrey Richman
- Original release date: April 1, 2022
- Running time: 46 minutes

Guest appearances
- Sydney Cole Alexander as Natalie; Michael Siberry as Jame Eagan; Ben Stiller as Cartoon Kier Eagan (voice; uncredited)

Episode chronology
← Previous "Defiant Jazz"	Next → "The We We Are"

"What's for Dinner?" is the eighth episode of the first season of the American science fiction psychological thriller television series Severance. The episode was written by executive producer Chris Black, and directed by executive producer Ben Stiller. It was released on Apple TV+ on April 1, 2022.

The series follows employees of Lumon Industries, a biotechnology corporation that uses a medical procedure called "severance" to separate the memories of their employees: at work, Lumon employees, called "innies", can't remember anything outside of work. Outside work, Lumon employees, called "outies", can't remember anything about work. As a result, innies and outies experience two different lives, with distinct personalities and agendas. In the episode, the MDR team prepares their plan to awaken their innie versions in the outside world, while Cobel receives bad news.

The episode received acclaim from critics, who praised the writing, pacing, performances, and ending. For the episode, Patricia Arquette received a nomination for Outstanding Supporting Actress in a Drama Series at the 74th Primetime Emmy Awards.

== Plot ==
After taking his dog for a walk, Irving (John Turturro) in his outie personality returns to his apartment, where he lives alone. As he drinks coffee, he stares at a few of his paintings, all of which depict a dark corridor with a door at the end with an upside-down red triangle above it. He begins another painting while blasting Motörhead's "Ace of Spades" on a stereo. (Note: The black liquid Irving hallucinates inside the office in preceding episodes is revealed to be the paint his Outie uses. Furthermore, the score in those scenes is a variation on the main guitar riff from "Ace of Spades".)

At the office, Helly (Britt Lower) achieves 100% of her MDR file, thereby allowing the four coworkers to narrowly meet MDR's quota for the quarter. Cobel (Patricia Arquette) meets with Mark (Adam Scott) to prepare a "Waffle Party" as his team's reward, and informs him that she is scheduling a final wellness session with Ms. Casey (Dichen Lachman) for him. During the session, Ms. Casey states that she is being retired, and Mark asks if he can talk to somebody for her. Cobel watches the session, and appears disappointed when Mark and Ms. Casey fail to remember each other as husband and wife. She has Milchick (Tramell Tillman) take Ms. Casey to the "testing floor," whose entrance is shown to be the same dark corridor as in Irving's paintings.

While Milchick hosts a celebration with the office, Cobel is confronted by Natalie (Sydney Cole Alexander) for withholding Helly's suicide attempt from Lumon's board and trying to get close to Mark's outie as Mrs. Selvig. Cobel is fired, infuriating her. This forces Milchick to leave the celebration, taking Cobel's items and escorting her out of the building. With this, the MDR team commences their plan to have Dylan (Zach Cherry) awaken their innies outside the office. Before leaving in the elevator, Helly kisses Mark, fearing they might not reunite. Dylan leaves for the Perpetuity Wing for his Waffle Party, in which he dons a Kier Eagan mask and sits in the replica of Kier's bedroom while ritualistic and seductive dances are performed in front of him. (Note: The dancers wear masks based on the "Four Tempers", a set of personality traits (woe, frolic, malice, and dread) that Kier believed to comprise every human being. The data in the MDR files is also sorted into bins labeled after the Four Tempers.)

An angry Cobel arrives home, where she renounces her devotion to Kier and destroys a shrine she had created for him in her basement. Noticing her state, Mark's outie asks her to accompany him to a book-reading party for Ricken (Michael Chernus). There, Mark confides in Selvig that he wants to quit Lumon, and she encourages him to do it, hugging him. Dylan leaves his Waffle Party and locks himself in the security room, using the manual's instructions to properly monitor Mark, Helly and Irving. He activates the overtime contingency to awaken their innies in the outside world.

== Development ==
=== Production ===
The episode was written by executive producer Chris Black, and directed by executive producer Ben Stiller. This marked Black's first writing credit, and Stiller's fifth directing credit.

=== Writing ===
Describing the "waffle party" featured in the episode, series creator Dan Erickson said, "it kind of started as a joke in the writers' room that then developed into something we thought was really interesting. It all comes down to the commodification of sex and intimacy, and that this is a world where you're not supposed to express any sexuality amongst your coworkers. And yet they have to give the employees that outlet, because they may be having sexual experiences on the outside, but not know. So it's a way for Lumon to take that human need and turn it into a sort of pro-Lumon thing."

=== Casting ===
The episode features an uncredited appearance of director Ben Stiller, who voices Kier Eagan in an animated video. While editing the episode, Stiller recorded the character's lines, intending to use them as a temporary track until another actor would record them. After consulting with series creator Dan Erickson and the rest of the staff, it was decided that Stiller's lines would stay in the final cut. Stiller explained that this was "an act", given that Eagan already appears in the series, adding "the thought was, 'Oh, they've hired an actor to do this for when they refine a file.'" Erickson himself considers that within the series universe, Lumon hired Stiller himself to record the video.

== Critical reception ==
"What's for Dinner?" received critical acclaim. Matt Schimkowitz of The A.V. Club gave the episode an "A" and wrote, "'What's for Dinner?' is a flawless penultimate episode that leaves you longing for more while paying off on some season-long suspense. It's up there with the pre-season-finale outings of Game Of Thrones, Breaking Bad, etc."

Erin Qualey of Vulture gave the episode a perfect 5 star rating out of 5 and wrote, "As the music kicks up – it should be noted that it's the same melody that accompanies Irv's black goo reveries – he finally snags the second switch, clicking it into the 'on' position. The light goes green. The screen goes black. Please tell me I'm not the only one who screamed out loud in my living room at this scene." Oliver VanDervoort of Game Rant wrote, "That the Severance procedure is more than just a way to make sure that workers don't form attachments to their coworkers outside the office is made abundantly clear. The episode also does a very good job of really, for the first time, showing some real questions about just what Cobel's motivations are for many of the things she does. Explained away as just being a bad person for most of the season, there's a hint that remorse exists there. Once again, that feels like nuance that most other shows out there these days would miss on quite badly."

Myles McNutt of Episodic Medium wrote, "whereas 'Hide and Seek' was embedded in the season's rising action, Severance has clearly signaled that we have entered the climax of this chapter of the story, and with that comes a heightened energy to a situation that we know will not be resolved before the cut to black." Breeze Riley of Telltale TV gave the episode a 4.5 star rating out of 5 and wrote, "Ending on Rickon's dinner party gives us the perfect setup for all hell to break loose on the finale. With Ms. Selvig and Mark in one place, it seems likely Rickon's book reading is going to be upstaged big time."

Mary Littlejohn of TV Fanatic gave the episode a 4 star rating out of 5 and wrote, "On these last few episodes, the stakes have amped up considerably. This episode was full of mounting tension, and the pace has certainly picked up. My heart was pounding during the final sequence." Caemeron Crain of TV Obsessive wrote, "mostly I'm just looking forward to (innie) Mark being starstruck at meeting Ricken, because I think that will be hilarious."

=== Awards and accolades ===
Patricia Arquette submitted the episode to support her nomination for Outstanding Supporting Actress in a Drama Series at the 74th Primetime Emmy Awards. She would lose to Julia Garner for Ozark.
