= Mark Scout =

Severance character

Mark Scout/Mark S.
- Severance character
- First appearance: "Good News About Hell" (2022)
- Created by: Dan Erickson
- Portrayed by: Adam Scott

In-universe information
- Title: Department chief
- Occupation: History professor Macrodata refiner
- Affiliation: Lumon Industries
- Spouse: Gemma Scout
- Significant other: Helly R.
- Home: Kier, PE, United States

Mark Scout and Mark S. are fictional characters and the main protagonists of the Apple TV+ series Severance, portrayed by Adam Scott.

An employee at Lumon Industries, former history professor Mark Scout underwent "severance"—a medical procedure that ensures they retain no memories of the outside world while at work and have no recollection of their job once they leave, essentially creating a new consciousness known as an "innie". Scout's "innie", Mark S., works on Lumon's "severed floor" with other severed workers.

Scott has received praise for his performance; he was nominated for an Emmy for Outstanding Lead Actor in a Drama Series at the 74th and 77th Primetime Emmy Awards in 2022 and 2025.

== Overview ==
Mark previously worked as a history professor at Ganz College, specializing in World War I. He met and married fellow college professor Gemma Scout, and the two shared a happy marriage. The couple had difficulty conceiving a baby, and sought help from a fertility clinic run by Lumon Industries.

The police informed Mark that Gemma had died in a car accident, which caused him considerable grief. He began drinking excessively to cope, and lost his job at Ganz College after coming to work drunk. He took a severed job at Lumon Industries to cope with the grief of losing his wife.

On the severed floor he is known as Mark S. He is made department chief of the Macrodata Refinement (MDR) department when his best friend and former department chief, Petey, goes missing. Petey's loss and the addition of a new, rebellious worker Helly R. cause him to question Lumon.

Outside of Lumon, Petey contacts Mark who does not recognize him due to the severance procedure which blocks his work memories when he is outside of work. Petey gives Mark negative information, which also cause him to question Lumon. Through Petey, Mark makes contact with Asal Reghabi, who gives him the security chief's key card, and later helps Mark to reintegrate. After the MDR team's use of the overtime contingency, he learns that his wife Gemma is alive at Lumon.

Mark successfully rescues his wife from Lumon, but his work self chooses to stay on the severed floor to be with Helly, preventing his work self from being erased.

== Development ==
=== Writing ===
The original pilot featured Mark waking up on the table as a newly severed employee. According to series creator Dan Erickson, the plot was changed to have Helly be the character waking up on the table in order to give Mark, the main protagonist, a sense of history on the floor. Erickson explained, "We wanted to be able to follow him as someone who already has friends, who knows the lay of the land here, and have this other character Helly comes in and is new and sort of blowing everything up and questioning the formula."

=== Casting ===
Both series creator Dan Erickson and executive producer Ben Stiller independently decided on Adam Scott as their first choice for the role. Stiller, who had previously worked with Scott on The Secret Life of Walter Mitty, contacted Scott about the role in January 2017 and Scott expressed interest in playing the part. Apple executives were hesitant to cast Scott and wanted to audition other actors. Stiller asked Scott to send in an audition tape for the role, fearing that Scott would be insulted by this and refuse to make the tape. Scott, who was hosting a game show at the time said, "I remember sitting there thinking, Am I in any position to say 'No, thanks' to audition for probably the best pilot I've ever read?"

== Reception ==
Saloni Gajjar of The A.V. Club noted the similarities of the two sides of the character in season 1, writing "Both Marks avoid confrontation—on the outside, he’s running from his sorrow, and inside, he'll do whatever it takes to help Helly adjust instead of listening to her concerns."

Alan Sepinwall of Rolling Stone contrasts the two versions of the character at the beginning of the series and in the season two finale, writing "It’s almost an inverse of the two Marks we met at the beginning of the series, where Outie Mark was burdened with grief and generally puzzled by the world around him, while Innie Mark was an easygoing guy who felt entirely at peace in MDR until Helly dropped into his life and made him question everything about it. Now, it's Outie Mark who is at least playacting at being upbeat, trying to create a sense of teamwork with his Innie, and it's Innie Mark who is pained and suspicious."
