= Helly R. =

Severance character

- Severance character
- Lower portraying the character on the severed floor in "Hello, Ms. Cobel"
- First appearance: "Good News About Hell" (2022)
- Created by: Dan Erickson
- Portrayed by: Britt Lower

In-universe information
- Alias: Helly Riggs
- Occupation: Macrodata refiner
- Affiliation: Lumon Industries
- Family: Jame Eagan (father)
- Significant other: Mark Scout
- Origin: Kier, PE, United States

Helena Eagan and Helly R. are fictional characters portrayed by Britt Lower in the Apple TV+ series Severance. Severance follows employees at the biotechnology corporation Lumon Industries that have undergone "severance"—a medical procedure that ensures they retain no memories of the outside world while at work and have no recollection of their job once they leave. This results in two distinct personalities for each employee: the "innie", who exists solely within Lumon, and the "outie", who lives their personal life outside of work.

Helly R. is one of the series' major protagonists, introduced as a rebellious and defiant employee of Lumon Industries, and later becomes a love interest to Mark S. A major plot twist in the series reveals her "outie" personality to be Helena Eagan; one of the overarching antagonists of the series, Helena is the cold and manipulative heiress and high-ranking member of Lumon.

Britt Lower's portrayal has received praise; she has been described as one of the show's breakout stars. For her performance in the second season, Lower received the Primetime Emmy Award for Outstanding Lead Actress in a Drama Series during the 2025 ceremony.

== Overview ==
Helena is a descendant of Lumon company founder Kier Eagan and grew up with her father, Lumon CEO Jame Eagan.

Loyal to the Lumon corporation, she decided to undergo the severance procedure. She awakes on the severed floor with no memories, and is unhappy working as a severed employee. Called "Helly R." on the severed floor, she rebels against the company, initially unaware that she is the daughter of the CEO and in a high position at the company. She makes several attempts to permanently leave the floor, including a suicide attempt.

After the MDR team's use of the overtime contingency to activate the severance chip outside of Lumon, she decides to block her severed chip, retaining her personal memories on the severed floor while pretending to retain only her work memories as "Helly R." She is discovered by colleague Irving B. who attempts to drown her until Milchick agrees to unblock her chip.

== Development ==
According to Erickson, the idea of Helly R. being an Eagan was something that came up in the writers' room and according to Erickson, "Once that idea came up, it was just sort of too delicious not to pursue." Erickson elaborated, "What's the ultimate nightmare for someone like Helly? It would be to find out that the devil is you. That it's not Mark, or Milchick, or Cobel keeping you here, it was you. And not only that but you're keeping everyone here. It was just so fascinating to think about how that would affect her."

Britt Lower researched amnesia in order to learn about "the emotional experience of forgetting the parts of your life that make you who you are."

== Reception ==
Michael Walsh of Nerdist described both versions of the character as being "trapped", writing that though Eagan told her Innie in season 1 that she was a person and her innie was not, "When Helena watched the security footage of Helly kissing Mark, we saw Helena realize she had it all backwards. Helly R. is a person. ... She might be trapped on Lumon’s severed floor, but she’s free to be herself. ... Helena, though, is not even a person. She is nothing more than a tool used without concern by a global conglomerate. She is so bound in service to Lumon she let the company split her mind in two."

For her performance in the second season, Lower received the Primetime Emmy Award for Outstanding Lead Actress in a Drama Series during the 2025 ceremony.
