= Sydney Cole Alexander =

American actress

- Education: State University of New York at Purchase
- Occupation: Actress

Sydney Cole Alexander is an American actress. She is best known for her role as Natalie Kalen in the Apple TV+ series Severance.

== Early life and education ==
Alexander lived in both Chicago and New York City as a child. She has heterochromia iridum. She attended Purchase College where she earned a BFA in acting.

== Career ==
Alexander worked as a SoulCycle instructor. She landed her breakthrough role as Natalie Kalen in Severance following a four-month audition process. She has said her performance is influenced by her own experiences at corporate jobs where "everyone was smiling and friendly" but there was "viciousness under the surface".

== Selected filmography ==
=== Film ===
Year	Title	Role
2024	Psycho Therapy	Zoe
2025	Mission: Impossible – The Final Reckoning	Lt. Cmdr. Bennet
2026	One Night Only	Sophie

=== Television ===
Year	Show	Role	Notes
2016	Limitless	Receptionist	Episode: “Stop Me Before I Hug Again”
2017	She’s Gotta Have It	Sydney	Episode: "#HowToMakeLoveToANegroWithoutGettingTired"
2022–25	Severance	Natalie Kalen	7 episodes
2026	Not Suitable for Work	Naya Washington	Recurring Guest, Season 1, Episodes 1&9
