= Parker McCollum discography =

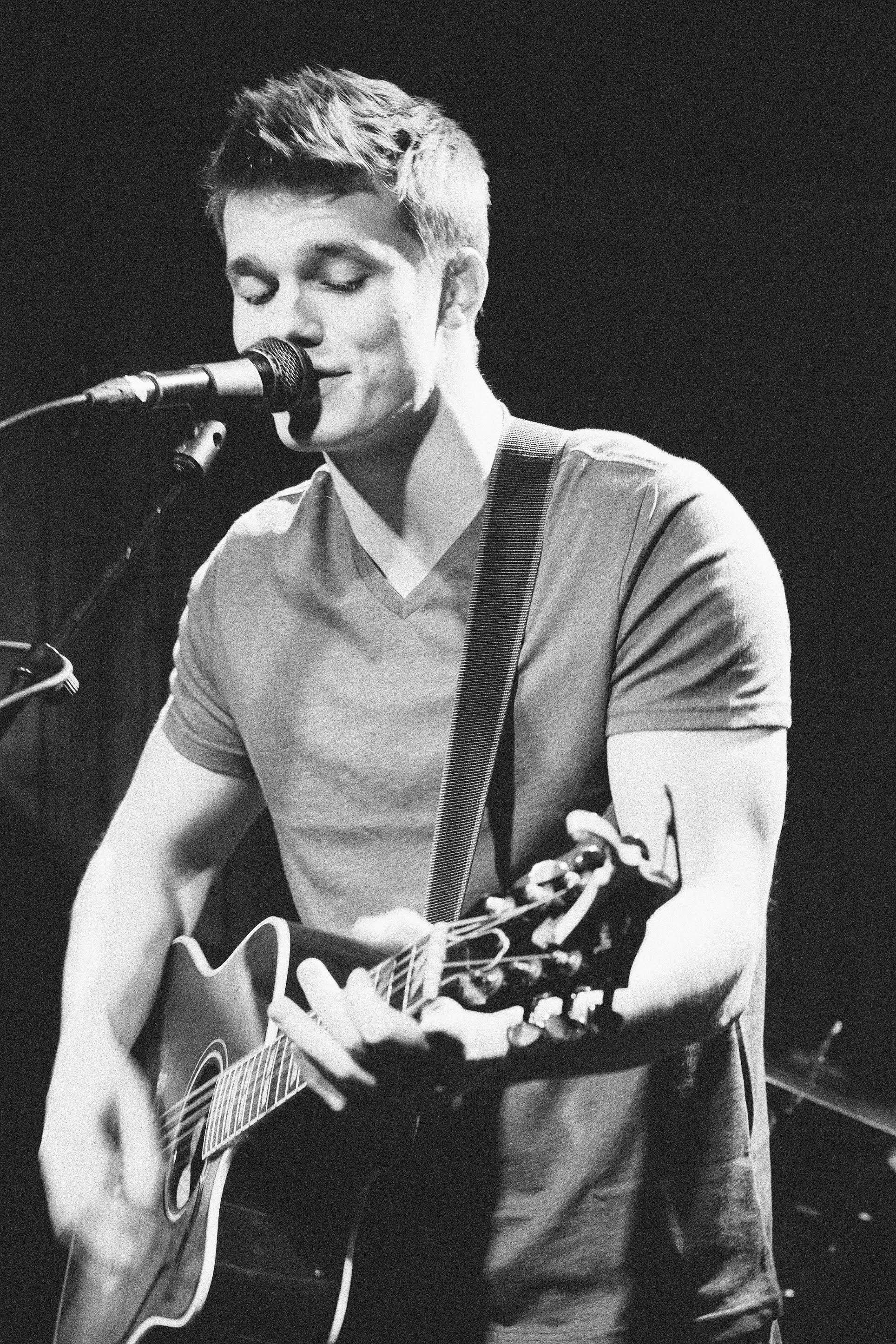
- McCollum in 2014
- Studio albums: 6
- EPs: 4
- Singles: 13
- No. 1 singles: 3

American country music singer Parker McCollum has released six studio albums, four extended plays, and twelve singles. Of his albums, Gold Chain Cowboy is certified Gold by the Recording Industry Association of America, with his highest peaking albums being Gold Chain Cowboy and his self-titled fifth album, which both peaked at number six on the Billboard Top Country Albums chart. "Pretty Heart" was his highest single, reaching number four the Billboard Hot Country Songs chart.

== Albums ==
Title	Details	Peak chart positions		Sales	Certifications
Title	Details	US	US Country	Sales	Certifications
The Limestone Kid	Released: February 24, 2015; Label: PYM Music; Format: CD, LP, digital download	—	—		
Probably Wrong	Released: November 10, 2017; Label: PYM Music; Format: CD, digital download	—	—	US: 600	
Gold Chain Cowboy	Released: July 30, 2021; Label: MCA Nashville; Format: CD, LP, digital download	60	6		RIAA: Gold
Never Enough	Released: May 12, 2023; Label: MCA Nashville; Format: CD, LP, digital download	56	12		
Parker McCollum	Released: June 27, 2025; Label: UMG Nashville; Format: CD, LP, digital download	35	6		
Live from Sound City	Released: October 13, 2026; Label: MCA Nashville; Format: digital download	—	—		
"—" denotes releases that did not chart

== EPs ==
Title	EP details	Peak chart positions					Sales
Title	EP details	US	US Country	US Heat	US Folk	US Indie	Sales
A Red Town View	Released: November 19, 2013; Label: Parker McCollum	—	—	—	—	—	
Probably Wrong: Session One	Released: July 7, 2017; Label: Parker McCollum	—	—	6	23	14	US: 2,000
Probably Wrong: Session Two	Released: September 8, 2017; Label: Parker McCollum	—	—	16	—	50	US: 1,000
Hollywood Gold	Released: October 16, 2020; Label: MCA Nashville	99	10	—	—	—	
"—" denotes releases that did not chart

== Singles ==
=== 2010s ===
List of singles released in the 2010s decade, with selected chart positions, showing year released, certifications, and album name
Year	Title	Peak chart positions	Certifications	Album
Year	Title	Texas Regional	Certifications	Album
2013	"Highway"'	74		A Red Town View
2015	"Meet You in the Middle"	45		The Limestone Kid
2015	"High Above the Water"	45		The Limestone Kid
2016	"All Day"	33		The Limestone Kid
2017	"I Can't Breathe"	20	RIAA: Gold	Probably Wrong
2017	"Hell of a Year"	14	RIAA: Gold	Probably Wrong
2018	"Misunderstood"	13		Probably Wrong

=== 2020s ===
List of singles released in the 2020s decade, with selected chart positions, showing year released, certifications, and album name
Year	Title	Peak chart positions					Certifications	Album
Year	Title	US	US Country	US Country Airplay	CAN	CAN Country	Certifications	Album
2020	"Pretty Heart" (Note: "Pretty Heart" also peaked at number one on the Texas regional chart.)	36	4	1	70	11	RIAA: 4× Platinum; MC: Gold	Gold Chain Cowboy
2021	"To Be Loved by You"	41	6	1	—	33	RIAA: 3× Platinum	Gold Chain Cowboy
2022	"Handle on You"	30	10	2	81	4	RIAA: Platinum	Never Enough
2023	"Burn It Down"	42	7	1	—	4	RIAA: Platinum	Never Enough
2024	"What Kinda Man"	66	15	2	—	44		Parker McCollum
2026	"Killin' Me"	— (Note: "Killin' Me" did not enter the Billboard Hot 100, but peaked at number 4 on the Bubbling Under Hot 100 chart.)	30	27	—	—		Parker McCollum
"—" denotes a recording that did not chart or was not released in that territory.

=== Promotional singles ===
Promotional singles by Parker McCollum
Year	Title	Peak chart positions	Certifications	Album
Year	Title	US Country	Certifications	Album
2020	"Like a Cowboy"	— (Note: "Like a Cowboy" did not enter the Hot Country Songs chart, but peaked at number 22 on the Country Digital Song Sales chart.)	RIAA: Gold	Hollywood Gold
2020	"Young Man's Blues"	50	RIAA: Gold	Hollywood Gold
2021	"Drinkin'"	—		Gold Chain Cowboy
2021	"Rest of My Life"	—		Gold Chain Cowboy
2022	"Carrying Your Love with Me"	—		Non-album single
2022	"Stoned"	40		Never Enough
2023	"I Ain't Going Nowhere"	—		Never Enough
2023	"Speed"	—		Never Enough
2023	"Tails I Lose"	—		Never Enough
2024	"Perfectly Lonely"	—		Non-album singles
2024	"High Above the Water (Live)"	—		Non-album singles
2024	"American Girl (Live)"	—		Non-album singles
2025	"Hope That I'm Enough"	—		Parker McCollum
2025	"Big Sky"	—		Parker McCollum
2026	"Big Ole Fancy House"	—		Parker McCollum: The Deluxe Edition
"—" denotes a recording that did not chart or was not released in that territory.

== Other appearances ==
List of singles as featured artist, with selected chart positions, showing year released, and album name
Year	Title	Peak chart positions		Artist	Album
Year	Title	US Country Airplay	CAN Country	Artist	Album
2016	"Love"	—	—	Koe Wetzel	Noise Complaint
2019	"Shallow"	—	—	Danielle Bradbery	In Between: The Collection
2022	"Road to Abilene"	—	—	Ronnie Dunn	100 Proof Neon
2023	"Lonely Long"	—	—	Diplo	Diplo Presents Thomas Wesley: Chapter 2 - Swamp Savant
2024	"Santa Fe"	—	—	Miranda Lambert	Postcards from Texas
2025	"Sounds Like Something I'd Say"	—	—	Kassi Ashton	Made from the Dirt: The Blooms
2025	"Is This Thing Workin'"	—	—	Randy Rogers Band	Non-album singles
2025	"Paper Umbrellas"	43	57	Tim McGraw	Non-album singles

== Music videos ==
Year	Video	Director
2020	"Pretty Heart"	Carlos Ruiz
2021	"To Be Loved by You"	Peter Zavadil
2023	"Handle on You"	Jim Wright
2023	"Burn It Down"	Dustin Haney
2025	"What Kinda Man"	Dustin Haney
