= Music of Severance =

Soundtrack for the Apple TV+ television series

The music of Severance, an American Apple TV+ science fiction psychological thriller television series created by Dan Erickson and executive produced and primarily directed by Ben Stiller, is centered around an award-winning score composed by Theodore Shapiro which combines traditional, jazz, and electronic elements. Curated by music supervisor George Drakoulias, the show also incorporates existing songs from artists like I Monster, Billie Holiday, Mose Allison, The Stone Roses, Joe McPhee, The Who, and Antônio Carlos Jobim.

On YouTube, Apple TV has released various mixes of Shapiro's soundtrack. In September 2023, an eight-hour-long loop of Shapiro's Severance theme was released. In February 2025, American electronic dance music duo Odesza released a 23-minute-long remix of Shapiro's score, coinciding with the airing of the television series' second season. Additionally, Apple Music released a playlist, titled "Defiant Jazz," inspired by the first season's seventh episode of the same name.

== Score ==
Shapiro found out about Severance when he was at a Halloween party with Adam Scott, the actor who portrays Mark Scout in the show. Curious about the show's premise, Shapiro hoped to be called upon to compose a score for Severance. Later, he received a call from Stiller in 2019, after which scripts were handed over. Shapiro began composing ideas immediately.

Early on during the show's development, Shapiro and Stiller shared ideas for a possible theme for the show. Eventually, Stiller found four chords in one of Shapiro's draft pieces that he really liked, after which Shapiro and Stiller began playing around further with the isolated idea: "I started trying to pull it apart as much as possible and see where that could take me, so that when they were done shooting the show, there would be a library of material based around this simple starting point that we could use to place in the film."

Shapiro intended for the soundtrack's reliance on piano and strings to convey the "fundamental mystery at the core of this show. [Each episode] peels back layers, essentially getting at the question, what is happening here at Lumon Industries?" The soundtrack also makes use of a "stuttering, distorted radio-frequency noise" which resulted from a digitally manipulated "reversed piano note."

=== Season 1 ===
Severance: Season 1 (Apple TV+ Original Series Soundtrack)

Soundtrack album by Theodore Shapiro
- Released: February 18, 2022
- Length: 51:29
- Label: Endeavor Content

Severance: Season 1 (Apple TV+ Original Series Soundtrack) is the soundtrack to the first season of Severance. It was released on February 18, 2022, by Endeavor Content. All tracks were performed, written, and produced by Shapiro.

Severance: Season 1 (Apple TV+ Original Series Soundtrack)
No.	Title	Length
1.	"Main Titles"	1:20
2.	"Labor Of Love"	2:04
3.	"Kimono Hallway"	4:26
4.	"Hall Of Eagans"	2:18
5.	"Note To Self"	2:04
6.	"Tokens"	1:47
7.	"Expiration Date"	4:29
8.	"Still Vibrating"	1:49
9.	"Tree Of Life"	3:01
10.	"Done For The Night"	2:38
11.	"Secret Places"	3:24
12.	"Interdepartmental"	1:21
13.	"After Hours"	3:57
14.	"Batter Up"	2:42
15.	"Safely Situated"	2:10
16.	"The Four Tempers"	2:12
17.	"That Innie"	5:25
18.	"Cobel At Lumon"	1:23
19.	"Alive"	2:51
Total length:		51:29

Music Of Wellness (From Severance: Season 1 Apple TV+ Original Series Soundtrack)
No.	Title	Length
1.	"Music Of Wellness"	3:04
Total length:		3:04

On November 23, 2022, the online shop Mondo released two limited-edition vinyl records of the Severance season one score. The first record, called the "Innie Edition," retailed for $60 and included both Shapiro's score, art by Greg Ruth, and other miscellaneous items like a bingo sheet and a few character cards; only 5,000 copies were pressed. The second record, called the "Outie Edition," retailed for $35 and includes Shapiro's score and Ruth's artwork without the miscellaneous items from the "Innie Edition"; similarly, only 5,000 copies were pressed. The packaging concept for both records was designed by Ruth and Spencer Hickman. Of Shapiro's score, Mondo wrote that it was "nothing short of jaw-dropping. At first, it may seem simple and minimal, but it reveals itself to be complex, rich and detailed on repeated listens. Its haunting and otherworldly melodies weave in and out of time and space. A beguiling listen from start to end."

=== Season 2 ===
Severance: Season 2 (Apple TV+ Original Series Soundtrack)

Soundtrack album by Theodore Shapiro
- Released: March 28, 2025
- Length: 60:01
- Label: Endeavor Content

Severance: Season 2 (Apple TV+ Original Series Soundtrack) is the soundtrack to the second season of Severance. It was released on March 28, 2025, by Endeavor Content. All tracks were performed, written, and produced by Shapiro, except where noted.

Severance: Season 2 (Apple TV+ Original Series Soundtrack)
No.	Title	Length
1.	"The Ballad of Ambrose and Gunnel"	4:27
2.	"Elevator Down"	2:51
3.	"Head Fake"	2:02
4.	"Visitation Suite"	1:30
5.	"Something About Gemma"	1:50
6.	"The Fourth Appendix"	4:54
7.	"Beast With Two Backs"	4:48
8.	"The Eternal Dark"	5:36
9.	"Morning Routine"	2:36
10.	"Salt's Neck"	2:36
11.	"Beginnings"	3:21
12.	"Three's a Crowd"	3:07
13.	"Trains Running"	5:03
14.	"The Equator"	3:49
15.	"Knock Down Drag Out"	4:20
16.	"Together Again"	2:41
17.	"Escape"	3:31
18.	"Entering Lumon (ODESZA Severance Remix)"	2:11
Total length:		61:01

=== Accolades ===
Award	Year	Category	Nominee(s)	Result	Source
Primetime Creative Arts Emmy Awards	2022	Outstanding Original Main Title Theme Music	Theodore Shapiro	Nominated	
Primetime Creative Arts Emmy Awards	2022	Outstanding Music Composition for a Series (Original Dramatic Score)	Theodore Shapiro (for "The We We Are")	Won	
Primetime Creative Arts Emmy Awards	2025	Outstanding Music Composition for a Series (Original Dramatic Score)	Theodore Shapiro (for "Cold Harbor")	Won	
Hollywood Music in Media Awards	2022	Original Score — TV Show/Limited Series	Theodore Shapiro	Nominated	
Society of Composers & Lyricists Awards	2023	Outstanding Score for Television	Theodore Shapiro	Nominated	

== Existing songs ==
In addition to Shapiro's soundtrack, Severance also makes use of existing songs in its episodes.

Season 1
Song title	Artist	Episode	Source
"Joshua Fit De Battle Of Jericho"	Grant Green	2	
"Baby Don't Get Hooked on Me"	Mac Davis	4	
"Enter Sandman"	Metallica	4	
"Shakey Jake"	Joe McPhee	7	
"Campin Out"	Paul Cram Orchestra	7	
"Times of Your Life"	Paul Anka	7	
"I'll Be Seeing You"	Billie Holiday	7	
"Ace of Spades"	Motörhead	8, 9	
"Quiet Village"	Martin Denny	8	
"Chinese Surfer"	Kava Kon	8	
"Palace Of The Tiger Women"	Kava Kon	8	
"Lovely Island Girl"	The Coconut Islanders	8	
"Your Mind Is on Vacation"	Mose Allison	9	

Season 2
Song title	Artist	Episode	Source
"Burnin' Coal"	Les McCann	1	
"God Walked Down"	The Allergies	1	
"Young Man's Blues"	Mose Allison	2	
"Love Spreads"	The Stone Roses	3	
"Eminence Front"	The Who	3	
"Wave"	Antônio Carlos Jobim	4	
"The Wreck of the Edmund Fitzgerald"	Gordon Lightfoot	5	
"Coconut Water"	Robert Mitchum	5	
"Chinese Surfer"	Kava Kon	6	
"Sunshine of Your Love"	Ella Fitzgerald & Heckscher Big Band	6	
"La Valse à Mille Temps"	Jacques Brel	7	
"From the Cold"	Jon Winterstein	7	
"Baby, It's Cold Outside"	Frank Loesser	7	
"I'll Be Seeing You"	Billie Holiday	7	
"Where Do We Go From Here"	Charles Bradley	8	
"Fire Woman"	The Cult	8	
"Who Knows"	Marion Black	8	
"Sirius"	The Alan Parsons Project	10	
"I'll Be Seeing You"	Billie Holiday	10	
"The Windmills of Your Mind"	Mel Tormé	10	

== Other ==
=== 8 Hour Work Day Innie Mix ===
In September 2023, the Apple TV YouTube channel released an "8 Hour Work Day Innie Mix" which loops Shapiro's Severance theme for the duration of a 9–5 work day.

=== Defiant Jazz ===
In July 2022, after Severance's first season concluded airing, Apple Music released an official playlist, titled Defiant Jazz, inspired by the episode of the same name. Including songs by artists like Alice Coltrane and Pharoah Sanders, the playlist calls back to the episode's jazz-filled "Music Dance Experience" and "embodies the weird tension under the surface that always exists with the characters," according to Stiller.

=== "Music to Refine To" ===
On February 21, 2025, Odesza released a 23-minute mix of Shapiro's score entitled "Music to Refine To." It was released on YouTube as an eight-hour-long video set to footage from the television series, primarily of Mark S. (Scott) working at his desk with brief, occasional appearances from Helly R. (Britt Lower) and Dylan G. (Zach Cherry). The mix had been completed in under a month, due to a deadline from Apple TV+, and drew heavily from the duo's 2020 project Bronson.

As part of the collaboration, Odesza was given an early glimpse at the entire second season of Severance, as well as stems from Shapiro's score. Harrison Mills of Odesza stated that the duo "wanted to take people on a journey and give a wider breadth of music and play off and reinterpret Teddy's score in a unique way." Clayton Knight, Odesza's other member, stated "It's got Odesza energy, but it tries to capture the tone and motifs of the show. It's also the first time we haven't had a vocal element to work with. It uses zero vocals."
