= Killing Me =

Killing Me may refer to:

- "Killing Me" (L'Arc-en-Ciel song), 2005
- "Killing Me" (Chungha song), 2021
- "Killing Me" (Omar Apollo song), 2022
- "Killing Me", a song by Biohazard, from the album Reborn in Defiance
- "Killing Me", a song by Conan Gray, from the album Found Heaven
- "Killing Me", a song by Robbie Williams, from the album Life thru a Lens
- "Killin' Me", a song by Parker McCollum
- "Killin' Me", a song by Drowning Pool, from the album Desensitized
