= Paper Umbrellas =

Single by Tim McGraw featuring Parker McCollum
- Released: March 7, 2025
- Genre: Country
- Length: 3:29
- Label: Big Machine
- Songwriters: Monty Criswell; Drake Milligan
- Producers: Byron Gallimore; Tim McGraw

Tim McGraw singles chronology
"One Bad Habit" (2024)	"Paper Umbrellas" (2025)	"McArthur" (2026)

Parker McCollum singles chronology
"What Kinda Man" (2024)	"Paper Umbrellas" (2025)	"Killin' Me" (2026)

"Paper Umbrellas" is a song by American country music singer Tim McGraw featuring Parker McCollum. Originally a solo recording by McGraw for his 2023 album, Standing Room Only, it was later re-recorded as a duet with McCollum and released as a single on March 7, 2025. The song was written by Monty Criswell and Drake Milligan, and produced by Byron Gallimore and McGraw.

== Background ==
"Paper Umbrellas" was first released in August 2023 as a solo album track on McGraw's Standing Room Only. As described by Whiskey Riff, the titular image refers both to the fragile feelings of the song's female subject and to the decorative umbrellas found in drinks meant to numb heartache.

In 2024, McGraw approached Parker McCollum to join him on a new version. "It's off my Standing Room Only album. It's one of my favorite records off that album," McGraw said during a radio interview. "When it came time to release the single, I wanted another artist on it... I like what Parker's doing and I thought his voice would fit really well with this type of song. It has a real George Strait vibe," he explained.

== Critical reception and commercial performance ==
Whiskey Riff lauded McCollum's contribution to "Paper Umbrellas" as "country to the core," calling it a perfect match for his vocal style despite the fact that he did not write the track himself. Some critics felt the duet was underutilized, noting that McCollum's limited involvement, only singing from the second verse onward, missed the opportunity to more fully showcase his artistry. "If you're gonna release a song for the second time, at least make it a little more worthwhile," Wide Open Country wrote, while still praising the overall result as a "good song" that fans clearly enjoyed.

== Personnel ==
- Tim McGraw – producer, vocals
- Parker McCollum – vocals
- Byron Gallimore – producer, mixing, electric guitar
- Shannon Forrest – engineer, drums, percussion
- Ilya Toshinskiy – acoustic guitar
- Michael Landau – electric guitar
- Dave Levita – electric guitar
- Troy Lancaster – electric guitar
- Dan Dugmore – steel guitar
- Larry Franklin – fiddle
- Paul Bushnell – bass guitar
- Charlie Judge – keyboard, piano
- Jamie Muhoberac – keyboard, piano
- Greg Barnhill – background vocals
- Erik Lutkins – engineer, mixing, assistant mixing, additional engineer
- Eric Masse – additional engineer
- Adam Ayan – mastering

== Charts ==
Chart performance for "Paper Umbrellas"
Chart (2025)	Peak position
Canada Country (Billboard)	56
US Country Airplay (Billboard)	43
