= Wild Eyes =

Wild Eyes, Wild Eye or variants may refer to:

== Music ==
- "Wild Eyes" (Nana Mizuki song), 2005
- "Wild Eyes" (Broiler song), 2014, featuring Ravvel
- "Wild Eyes", a song by The Stampeders, 1971
- "Wild Eyes", a song by Parkway Drive from their 2012 album Atlas
- "Wild Eyes", a song by South Korean boy band Shinhwa from their 2001 album Hey, Come On!
- "Wildeye" (song), 2020, by Jónsi
- "Wild Eyes (Angel)", a song by Jefferson Starship from their 1981 album Modern Times
- Wildeyes, an American folk band

== Film ==
- Wildeye, a 2015 Finnish film
- The Wild Eye, a 1967 Italian film

== Other uses ==
- Wild Eyes (sailing vessel), helmed by American sailor Abby Sunderland

== See also ==
- All pages with titles containing either Wild Eye or Wildeye in any form
- Metal Max: Wild Eyes, a cancelled role-playing video game
