= Stoned (Parker McCollum song) =

2022 song by Parker McCollum

Promotional single by Parker McCollum

from the album Never Enough
- Released: February 2, 2022
- Genre: Country
- Length: 3:08
- Label: MCA Nashville
- Songwriters: Mark Holman; Brett James; Parker McCollum
- Producer: Jon Randall

Audio video
- "Stoned" on YouTube

"Stoned" is a song by American country music singer Parker McCollum. It was released on December 2, 2022, as a promotional single from his fourth studio album, Never Enough. McCollum co-wrote the song alongside Mark Holman and Brett James, and was produced by Jon Randall.

== Background ==
"Stoned" was intended as an album cut on McCollum's upcoming album, Never Enough, but fan interest led to its early release on December 2, 2022. In a statement, McCollum explained, "This song says so much while saying so little, which is exactly how I like it to be. I hope they love it!" He had previously teased "Stoned" alongside then-unreleased number-one hit "Handle on You".

The song's release coincided with the announcement of his 2023 tour dates.

== Composition and lyrics ==
Co-written with Brett James and Mark Holman, "Stoned" is a "reflective track [that] explores the universal experience of loneliness and misunderstanding and the routes we take to curb those emotions." The song is set to slow-strummed acoustic guitar chords. The song portrays McCollum managing his pain through self-medication. His vocals were described as "scratching at the door begging for someone to hear his cries."

"Stoned" aligned with McCollum's established songwriting themes, with McCollum stating that the song was "the same ole' me: heartbreak, love songs, and everything going terribly wrong."

== Critical reception ==
The song's nostalgic quality drew comparisons to Hank Williams, with The Nash News stating that McCollum's "storytelling and vocal inflections bring a sense of 'old-school country' back into the forefront."

== Personnel ==
Musicians

- Parker McCollum – lead vocals
- Jimmy Wallace – keyboards, Hammond B3
- Craig Young – bass
- Chad Cromwell – drums, percussion
- Rob McNelley – electric guitar
- Bryan Sutton – acoustic guitar
- Dan Dugmore – electric guitar
- Jessi Alexander – background vocals
- Kendra Chantelle – background vocals

Technical

- Jon Randall – production
- Pete Lyman – mastering
- F. Reid Shippen – mixing, engineering
- Brandon Bell – editing
- Kyle Manner – editing
- Daniel Bacigalupi – mastering assistance
- Brandon Towles – mixing assistance, engineering assistance
- Ethan Barrette – engineering assistance

Visuals

- Karen Naff – art direction
- Kera Jackson – art production
- Craig Allen – design
- Jim Wright – photography

== Charts ==
Chart performance for "Stoned"
Chart (2022)	Peak position
US Hot Country Songs (Billboard)	40
