= Killin' Me =

2025 song by Parker McCollum

Single by Parker McCollum

from the album Parker McCollum
- Released: February 17, 2026
- Genre: Country
- Length: 3:17
- Label: MCA Nashville
- Songwriters: Parker McCollum; Randy Rogers; Monty Criswell
- Producers: Frank Liddell; Eric Masse

Parker McCollum singles chronology
"Paper Umbrellas" (2025)	"Killin' Me" (2026)

Music video
- "Killin' Me" on YouTube

"Killin' Me" is a song by American country music singer Parker McCollum. It was first released on June 13, 2025, as a promotional single from his self-titled fifth studio album (2026), before being sent to country radio as the album's second single on February 17, 2026. The song was written by McCollum himself, Randy Rogers and Monty Criswell and produced by Frank Liddell and Eric Masse.

== Background ==
Parker McCollum first teased the song on the video-sharing app TikTok in 2024. In an interview with Apple Music, he described the process of composing the song:

It's pretty different from how I wrote it, especially the scene change in the solo. You're going to a whole other place for that solo, and then you come right back to where you were. I don't think the band heard any of the songs on the record before we were recording them. I would just start playing them and everybody would just fall in. And everybody was really encouraged and told very sternly like, "Hey, play whatever the hell you want to play. Mess up, play wrong notes. If you think it's dumb, wrong—just play and play."

== Composition ==
The song features a more stripped-down, Americana-influenced sound reminiscent of Parker McCollum's debut album, The Limestone Kid. It contains ascending guitar lines and "unhurried" drumbeats. Lyrically, it revolves around him being captivated by a woman. McCollum suggests a sense of forbidden love, but is unable to resist lusting after her and fantasizes about her attractive qualities. He further implies that their encounter does not reflect true love. Although he acknowledges it may be a fleeting romance, he gives in to her allure without caring about the potential consequences for him.

McCollum performed the song with Lee Ann Womack at the 61st Academy of Country Music Awards on May 17, 2026. Following the performance, Womack recorded a duet version with McCollum, which was released to streaming services on June 26, 2026.

== Critical reception ==
Ross Jones of Holler criticized the song, describing it as "borderline painful in its whiny ache, made worse by being sandwiched between the far more enjoyable 'Solid Country Gold' and 'Good Time Charlie's Got The Blues'." Edward Brown of PaperCity Magazine praised the song, writing it "glides from verse to chorus without losing momentum, showcasing the country star's gift for hook-driven melodies and heartfelt lyrics."

== Music video ==
An official music video was released on February 11, 2026. Directed by Dustin Haney and shot in Fort Worth, Texas, it opens with Parker McCollum driving to the Hotel Drover, in a black GMC truck with a license plate from Tom Clark Auto Park, a dealership from Denton. He sits at the 97 West Kitchen & Bar inside the hotel, drinking bourbon whiskey until he notices a woman (played by his wife Hallie Ray Light) dancing alone in a long, silky black dress, while couples two-step around her. After they exchange glances, he approaches and dances with her. The story is intercut with clips of McCollum performing at Billy Bob's Texas. The video features a cameo from baseball player Josh Jung.

== Charts ==
Chart performance for "Killin' Me"
Chart (2026)	Peak position
US Bubbling Under Hot 100 (Billboard)	4
US Country Airplay (Billboard)	27
US Hot Country Songs (Billboard)	30
