= To Be Loved by You =

To Be Loved by You may refer to:

- "To Be Loved by You" (Wynonna Judd song), a 1996 song by Wynonna Judd
- "To Be Loved by You" (Parker McCollum song), a 2021 song by Parker McCollum
