= Heroes and Villains (disambiguation) =

"Heroes and Villains" is a 1967 song by the Beach Boys.

Heroes and Villains or Heroes & Villains may also refer to:

== Music ==
- Heroes & Villains, a 2022 album by Metro Boomin
- Heroes and Villains (album), a 2003 album by Paloalto
- Heroes and Villains (band), an American indie-rock band
- Heroes & Villains, a soundtrack from The Powerpuff Girls

== Literature ==
- Heroes and Villains (novel), a 1969 novel by Angela Carter
- Heroes and Villains: The True Story of the Beach Boys, a 1986 biography by Steven Gaines

== Television ==
- Heroes and Villains, a 1994 BBC series of docudramas produced by Tiger Aspect Productions
- Heroes and Villains (TV series), a 2007-2008 BBC series of docudramas
- "Heroes and Villains" (Only Fools and Horses), a 1996 episode of the BBC sitcom Only Fools and Horses
- "Heroes and Villains" (Once Upon a Time), an episode of the TV series Once Upon a Time
- "Heroes and Villains", an episode of Spider-Man: The New Animated Series.
- AFI's 100 Years...100 Heroes & Villains, a 2003 television special from the American Film Institute

== Other ==
- Heroes and Villains Entertainment, an American production and management company

== See also ==
- Hero (disambiguation)
- Villain (disambiguation)
- Survivor: Heroes vs. Villains, the 20th season of the television series Survivor
