= What Kinda Man =

Single by Parker McCollum

from the album Parker McCollum
- Released: September 13, 2024
- Recorded: March 20–26, 2024
- Studio: Power Station (New York, New York)
- Genre: Country
- Length: 4:19 (album version); 3:50 (radio edit)
- Label: UMG Nashville
- Songwriters: Natalie Hemby; Parker McCollum; Jeremy Spillman
- Producers: Frank Liddell; Eric Masse

Parker McCollum singles chronology
"Burn It Down" (2023)	"What Kinda Man" (2024)	"Paper Umbrellas" (2025)

Music video
- "What Kinda Man" on YouTube

"What Kinda Man" is a song by American country music singer Parker McCollum. It was released on September 13, 2024, as the first single from his fifth studio album, Parker McCollum. McCollum co-wrote the song with Natalie Hemby and Jeremy Spillman.

== History ==
The writing process for the song began years before it was officially recorded. In April 2022, McCollum met with Natalie Hemby and Jeremy Spillman, and the trio worked on the song and many others. The song was initially slated to be recorded for McCollum's 2023 album, Never Enough, but was ultimately not cut.

"What Kinda Man" was officially released on September 13, 2024, after being teased on TikTok in January.

MCA Nashville shocked McCollum as they picked "What Kinda Man" as his next single, stating "he thought the production might be too rough for country radio." Co-writer Jeremy Spillman praised the song as relatable.

McCollum's largest influences while writing "What Kinda Man" and all of his other songs are Rodney Crowell, Steve Earle, James McMurtry, and Robert Earl Keen.

== Critical reception ==
Tom Rowland of Billboard described "What Kinda Man" as "boldly different" and that "it was McCollum's voice all right, but the Dylan-style harmonica, rough-cut Flying Burrito Brothers arrangement and Hawaiian steel-like slide guitar challenge all the norms of modern commercial country."

== Credits and personnel ==
Credits adapted from Tidal.

- Parker McCollum – vocals, composer, lyricist, harmonica
- Eric Masse – production, mixing, engineering
- Frank Liddell – production
- Natalie Hemby – composer, lyricist
- Jeremy Spillman – composer, lyricist
- Adam Wright – acoustic guitar, background vocals
- Eli Bearid – bass
- Nir Z – drums
- Harrison Whitford – electric guitar
- Jedd Hughes – electric guitar
- Nick Bockrath – electric guitar
- Stephen Marcussen – mastering
- Anna Lise Liddell – engineering
- Maddie Harmon – engineering

== Charts ==
=== Weekly charts ===
Weekly chart performance for "What Kinda Man"
Chart (2024–2025)	Peak position
Canada Country (Billboard)	44
US Billboard Hot 100	66
US Country Airplay (Billboard)	2
US Hot Country Songs (Billboard)	15

=== Year-end charts ===
Year-end chart performance for "What Kinda Man"
Chart (2025)	Position
US Country Airplay (Billboard)	41
US Hot Country Songs (Billboard)	75
