= Parker McCollum (album) =

Studio album by Parker McCollum
- Released: June 27, 2025
- Recorded: March 20–26, 2024
- Studios: Power Station (New York); Blackbird (Berry Hill); The Casino (Nashville); Sun Dog (Brentwood) (Note: Additional recording); Gold Diggers (Los Angeles); Whale Tale (Goleta); Creative Workshop (Nashville) (Note: Strings recording)
- Genre: Country
- Length: 58:37
- Label: UMG Nashville
- Producers: Frank Liddell; Eric Masse

Parker McCollum chronology
Never Enough (2023)	Parker McCollum (2025)	Live from Sound City (2026)

Singles from Parker McCollum
- 1. "What Kinda Man" Released: September 13, 2024; 2. "Killin' Me" Released: February 17, 2026

Parker McCollum is the fifth studio album by American country music artist Parker McCollum. The album was released on June 27, 2025, via UMG Nashville. It is McCollum's first album to be produced by Frank Liddell and Eric Masse.

The album marked a stylistic shift toward a more stripped-down, introspective sound, which McCollum described as the most personal and creatively fulfilling work of his career. The album was preceded by the lead single "What Kinda Man," alongside three promotional tracks: "Hope That I'm Enough," "Big Sky," and "Killin' Me". "Killin' Me" was serviced to country radio on February 17, 2026, as the album's second single. Upon release, the album received generally positive to mixed reviews, with praise towards songwriting and storytelling, and criticism of the production and certain vocal performances.

A deluxe edition was released on March 20, 2026. Parker McCollum won the Award for Album of the Year at the 61st Academy of Country Music Awards.

== Background and recording ==
McCollum began teasing his upcoming fifth album in February 2024, releasing clips of unreleased songs on social media, including "Big Ole Fancy House," "I Don't Want to Be a Cowboy Tonight," "Hope That I'm Enough," "As Far as I Can Tell," and "Every Move You Make." Of the five songs teased, only "Hope That I'm Enough" was cut for the record. "Big Ole Fancy House," despite not making the final track list, was later issued as a bonus acoustic track available through a special digital album download.

Initially, McCollum recorded seven songs for the new record with Jon Randall, the producer of his previous two albums, before deciding to start over and pursue a different creative direction. McCollum desired for a more raw, stripped-down sound, so he began working with Frank Liddell and Eric Masse.

During McCollum's Burn it Down Tour in 2024, McCollum began recording the new album at the Power Station in New York City, rather than in Nashville, where his previous albums were recorded. He described the recording experience as the "most creatively fulfilling of his career." The one-week-long recording session in March 2024 was part of a conscious reset. The one week stint began on March 20, and lasted until March 26. The day before recording started, McCollum posted to Twitter stating: "Studio tomorrow. Crazy to be recording my 5th studio album. I know for 100% fact that these songs and this record is best I've put together since the kid. Took me a long time to get back to this place as a songwriter. Feels good to be happy about my songs again." As McCollum explained in an interview with LB Cantrell of MusicRow, he booked a suite at the Ritz-Carlton Hotel overlooking Central Park, wore sunglasses and stylish clothes, and walked around the city imagining himself as a rockstar version of who he had always wanted to be. "I told myself I was the shit for seven days," he said, describing the purposeful mindset shift that helped unlock his most confident songwriting to date.

On March 21, 2025, at a sold-out crowd at the Houston Livestock Show and Rodeo, McCollum announced the June 27 release date of his self-titled album. On June 13, 2025, two weeks before the album's release, McCollum announced the full track listing via his website. On June 26, 2025, one day prior to the album's release, McCollum launched his headlining tour tied to the album.

Alongside releasing the previously omitted "Big Ole Fancy House" as a promotional single, McCollum announced the March 20, 2026, release date of the album's deluxe version.

== Themes ==
The album was described by McCollum as the most personal and introspective album of his career. "It was finally the album you always wondered if you were good enough to make—not for anybody else, didn't need anyone else to like it," he told Jessica Nicholson in a Billboard interview. It blends McCollum's Texas roots with an intentionally raw production aesthetic. He aimed to have the album return to his "sparser, alt-country-leaning sound that pervaded his much-loved debut album, The Limestone Kid." According to McCollum, the record wasn't a reinvention of himself, but a "letting go." He intentionally abandoned expectations of what a country artist should sound like and instead embraces a looser, instinctive process rooted in his identity.

Some of the tracks were written in the studio, starting with solo acoustic run throughs. Many tracks—including the autobiographical "Permanent Headphones"—originated in Texas. The latter was written by McCollum in 2007, when he was just 15 years old. The song became the first that earned praise from his older brother, Tyler, who McCollum claimed to be his influence and earliest supporter of his songwriter. He initially resisted including the song, but ultimately recorded it with a push from producers Liddell and Masse. McCollum admitted he became emotional upon hearing the final version, recalling, "It brought me back to being that kid again." The song was originally featured on McCollum's 2013 EP A Red Town View. The album also includes "Watch Me Bleed," co-written with Lori McKenna and Mat Kearney, which McCollum called a dark and stirring moment. McKenna helped him abandon structure and lean into vulnerability: "She's really good at getting me to open that part of myself I usually shut down," McCollum stated

Other personal aspects of the album include "Hope That I'm Enough," a love song inspired by McCollum's wife, Hallie Ray, and their relationship. "She's just as good as God can make a woman," McCollum said of the song's emotional foundation. The song "Solid Gold Country" pays tribute to McCollum's songwriting heroes, such as Guy Clark and John Prine, while his cover of Danny O'Keefe's "Good Time Charlie's Got the Blues" features fellow Texas native Cody Johnson. McCollum described Johnson as one of his role models in the music industry, having admired him since their early days, calling the collaboration a "full-circle moment." The album features a cover of Chris Knight's "Enough Rope."

Even with McCollum's continued radio success and a string of four consecutive number-one hits, he views this album as a turning point, both musically and personally. "It took me five studio albums to figure out how I want my career," he told MusicRow. "I spent ever day in New York freaking out, thinking I'd ruined everything. But on the last day, we sat and listened to everything we'd cut—and I just thought, yeah. This is it."

== Singles ==
Leading up to the album's release, McCollum released "What Kinda Man" as the album's lone single with "Hope That I'm Enough," "Big Sky," and "Killin' Me" as promotional singles.

"What Kinda Man" was released on September 13, 2024, and was written by McCollum, Jeremy Spillman, and Natalie Hemby. The song showcased a change in McCollum's style as he stated "I've only got two records left on my first-ever record deal, and I just didn't want to go put out a record that sounded like that last two...I always wanted to be John Mayer and George Strait, you know, and their records are sonically perfect. And I kind of came to the realization the last year [that] maybe that's just not me." He began writing the song years before its release and in April 2022, Hemby and Spillman helped McCollum finish the song and initially hoped to have the song on his 2023 album, Never Enough.

The first promotional single from the album, "Hope That I'm Enough," was officially released on April 16, 2025. McCollum co-wrote the song with Jessi Alexander and Matt Jenkins. The track had long been anticipated by fans, having been teased during an Instagram livestream in February 2024 and later debuted at the 2025 Country Radio Seminar (CRS) during a showcase at Nashville's Ryman Auditorium. McCollum introduced the song during that performance by reflecting on the vulnerability it expresses, saying he still gets nervous performing at CRS—particularly after an earlier encounter that day with Ringo Starr, who he met for the first time.

"Big Sky" was released on May 7, 2025, as the album's second promotional single. The track was co-written by McCollum alongside Charlie Magnone and Jarrod Morris. Leading up to the release, McCollum teased snippets of the song across social media, sharing footage from the studio alongside live acoustic previews. Fellow country artist Ernest responded to one of the teasers with a succinct endorsement: "Yes."

"Killin' Me," the album's third and final promotional single, was released on June 10, 2025. Written by McCollum alongside Monty Criswell and Randy Rogers, the track continues the album's stripped-down, neotraditional sound. The song was first teased on TikTok in 2024.

== Critical reception ==
Professional ratings
Review scores
Source	Rating
AllMusic	4/5 stars
Country Central	9.5/10
Country Universe	2.5/5 stars
Holler.	6.4/10 (Note: Collective rating of 6.4/10. Individual ratings were 7/10 by Soda Canter, 6.5/10 by Georgette Brooks, 6.7/10 by Caitlin Hall, and 6/10 by Daisy Innes and Ross Jones.)

Parker McCollum received positive to mixed reviews from critics, with praise for McCollum's songwriting and return to country roots, though some reviewers critiqued aspects of the production and vocal delivery.

Critics widely acknowledged the album as a reflection of McCollum's artistic identity, with Holler. describing it as his "most cohesive and emotionally gratifying album to date," highlighting his lyrical growth and balance of Americana, blues, and traditional country influences. Others praised McCollum's continued focus on emotionally resonant storytelling, with Country Central's Joel Reuben Pauley noting that the record "marks this collection of songs as a true reflection of who Parker McCollum really is."

Soda Canter of Holler. wrote that the album "fuses past and present" in a way that shows McCollum's evolution as a songwriter, with a strong appreciation for country music tradition. Similarly, other critics noted McCollum's storytelling ability as a standout strength, especially in songs like "Sunny Days" and "Hope That I'm Enough," which reflect nostalgia, emotional uncertainty, and personal growth. Songs like "Watch Me Bleed" and the album's opener "My Blue" were praised for their lyrical weight, with the latter described as a bold, layered introduction that channels a "[John] Mayer-infused" sound and showcases McCollum's capacity for fictional yet emotionally gripping narratives. Critics also highlighted the inclusion of two cover songs—Danny O'Keefe's "Good Time Charlie's Got the Blues" and Chris Knight's "Enough Rope"—as well-curated and thematically consistent choices that blended seamlessly with the album's original material.

However, not all reviews were glowing. Georgette Brookes, also of Holler., called the record "a sombre [sic], melancholic affair," acknowledging several standout tracks while also pointing to a lack of dynamic variation. Others, like Daisy Innes and Ross Jones, critiqued what they saw as overproduction and uneven vocal execution. Innes noted that "the supposed vulnerability of Parker's self-titled gets lost in too many backing vocals, unnecessarily heavy guitar solos and strangely placed harmonicas," while Jones highlighted pitch issues on tracks like "Killin' Me," despite also praising songwriting on "Permanent Headphones" and "Hope That I'm Enough."

== Track listing ==
No.	Title	Writer(s)	Length
1.	"My Blue"	Parker McCollum; Scooter Carusoe	5:11
2.	"Big Sky"	McCollum; Charlie Magnone; Jarrod Morris	2:47
3.	"Solid Country Gold"	McCollum; Jon Randall; Brad Warren; Brett Warren	3:28
4.	"Watch Me Bleed"	McCollum; Mat Kearney; Lori McKenna	4:02
5.	"Killin' Me"	McCollum; Monty Criswell; Randy Rogers	3:17
6.	"Good Time Charlie's Got the Blues" (featuring Cody Johnson)	Danny O'Keefe	3:51
7.	"Sunny Days"	McCollum; Tony Lane; Lee Thomas Miller; Randy Montana	4:12
8.	"Permanent Headphones"	McCollum	3:28
9.	"New York Is on Fire"	McCollum; Nick Bockrath; Adam Wright	4:53
10.	"Come On"	McCollum; Hillary Lindsey; McKenna; Liz Rose	4:11
11.	"What Kinda Man"	McCollum; Natalie Hemby; Jeremy Spillman	4:19
12.	"Hope That I'm Enough"	McCollum; Jessi Alexander; Matt Jenkins	4:45
13.	"Enough Rope"	Austin Cunningham; Chris Knight	3:51
14.	"My Worst Enemy"	McCollum; Wade Bowen	6:22
Total length:			58:37

Deluxe Edition
No.	Title	Writer(s)	Length
15.	"Montgomery County"	McCollum	3:28
16.	"Big Ole Fancy House"	McCollum; Lindsey; McKenna; Rose	4:03
17.	"The One Before the One"	Rogers; Sarah Buxton; Jedd Hughes	3:40
18.	"Wind My Friend"	McCollum; Jeff Hyde	4:17
Total length:			74:05

Bonus Track Version
No.	Title	Writer(s)	Length
15.	"Big Ole Fancy House" (Acoustic)	McCollum; Lindsey; McKenna; Rose	5:03
Total length:			63:40

== Personnel ==
Credits adapted from the album's liner notes.

=== Musicians ===
- Parker McCollum – lead vocals, acoustic guitar, harmonica, whistilng, stomps, claps
- Nir Z – drums, percussion, stomps, claps
- Eric Masse – percussion, background vocals, stomps, claps
- Eli Beaird – bass, stomps, claps
- Adam Wright – acoustic guitar, electric guitar, piano, Wurlitzer, stomps, claps
- Harrison Whitford – acoustic guitar, electric guitar, piano, background vocals, stomps, claps
- Nick Bockrath – acoustic guitar, electric guitar, stomps, claps
- Frank Carter Rische – acoustic guitar
- Jedd Hughes – electric guitar, background vocals
- Robbie Crowell – piano, B3 organ, synthesizer
- Lee Ann Womack – background vocals
- Madi Diaz – background vocals
- Aubrie Sellers – background vocals
- Mikky Ekko – background vocals
- Hillary Lindsey – background vocals
- Greg Leisz – steel guitar
- Mickey Raphael – harmonica
- Emily Rodgers – cello
- Austin Hoke – cello
- Cara Fox – cello
- Sari Reist – cello
- Patrick Monnius – viola
- Emily Kohavi – viola
- Betsy Lamb – viola
- Annaliese Kowart – violin
- Hannah Sorrells Tyler – violin
- Kristin Weber – violin
- Ben Plotnick – violin
- Eleonore Denig – violin
- Laura Epling – violin
- Dustin Haney – stomps, claps
- Frank Liddell – stomps, claps
- Anna Lise Liddell – stomps, claps
- Chris Kleinmeier – stomps, claps
- Nick Rhodes – stomps, claps
- Claiborne Myers – stomps, claps
- Armand Hutton – strings arrangement, conductor

=== Technical and visuals ===
- Frank Liddell – production
- Eric Masse – production, recording, mixing
- Anna Lise Liddell – recording assistance, additional recording
- Michael Hickey – recording assistance
- Maddie Harmon – recording assistance
- Juan Carlos Martinez – recording assistance
- Matthew Soares – recording assistance
- Eli Hirsch – additional recording
- Mai Leisz – additional recording
- Stephen Marcussen – mastering
- Teddy Morgan – strings recording
- Matthew "Buster" Allen – strings recording assistance
- Eleonore Denig – strings contracting
- Brittany Hamlin – production coordination
- Karen Naff – art production
- Kera Jackson – packaging production
- Jake Roggenbuck – packaging production
- Libby Trbrovic – packaging production
- Dustin Haney – creative direction, photography
- Sarah Dodds – art direction, design
- Shauna Dodds – art direction, design
- Tim O'Keefe – cover photo

== Charts ==
Weekly chart performance for Parker McCollum
Chart (2025)	Peak position
US Billboard 200	35
US Top Country Albums (Billboard)	6
