= Called Crazy =

Single by Kassi Ashton

from the album Made from the Dirt
- Released: May 6, 2024
- Genre: Country
- Length: 3:19
- Label: MCA Nashville; Interscope Records
- Songwriters: Kassi Ashton; Jared Keim; Emily Weisband
- Producers: Kassi Ashton; Luke Laird

Kassi Ashton singles chronology
"Drive You Out of My Mind" (2023)	"Called Crazy" (2024)

"Called Crazy" is a song by American country music singer Kassi Ashton. It was released on May 6, 2024, as Ashton's third single to country radio, and the second from her debut studio album, Made from the Dirt. Ashton co-wrote the song with Jared Keim and Emily Weisband, and co-produced it with Luke Laird.

== Background ==
Ashton was chosen as Audacy, Inc.'s 'Launch' Artist, lending additional platform support to "Called Crazy". In her interview with Audacy's Katie Neal, she described feeling defeated after the COVID-19 pandemic delayed her radio by rollout several years and her prior two radio singles did not chart well, saying when she wrote "Called Crazy" with Jared Keim and Emily Weisband that "if this isn't it, I don't know what is". Topically, the song is "a playful look at the truths of modern-day dating" born out of Ashton's realization that the guys who called her crazy are the ones who always call her back: "This wasn't some fancy hook or poetic notion that I stumbled across, it was just the cold hard truth hit me one day. Every man that's ever called me crazy just keeps calling — so does that mean I'm crazy, or does that mean that they're crazy?"

== Chart performance ==
"Called Crazy" debuted at number 53 on Billboard Country Airplay ahead of its release as a single, and pulled in adds from 43 stations by its impact date. It became her first song to enter the top 40 of the chart in its seventh chart week, and reached a peak of number 32 in August 2024.

== Charts ==
Chart performance for "Called Crazy"
Chart (2024)	Peak position
US Country Airplay (Billboard)	32
