= Standing Room Only (Tim McGraw song) =

Single by Tim McGraw

from the album Standing Room Only
- Released: March 10, 2023
- Genre: Country; country pop
- Length: 3:46
- Label: Big Machine
- Songwriters: Craig Wiseman; Tommy Cecil; Patrick Murphy
- Producers: Byron Gallimore; Tim McGraw

Tim McGraw singles chronology
"7500 OBO" (2021)	"Standing Room Only" (2023)	"One Bad Habit" (2024)

"Standing Room Only" is a song by American country music singer Tim McGraw. It was released on March 10, 2023, as the first single from his seventeenth studio album of the same name. The song was written by Craig Wiseman, Tommy Cecil, and Patrick Murphy, and produced by Byron Gallimore and McGraw.

== Commercial performance ==
"Standing Room Only" debuted at number 39 on the Hot Country Songs chart for the week of June 10, 2023, and peaked at number 16 in its 13th week on the chart.

On the Country Airplay chart, "Standing Room Only" debuted at number 20 for the week of March 25, 2023, and reached the top 10 for the week of October 14, 2023, marking McGraw's 60th top 10 Country Airplay hit, and tying him with Kenny Chesney for the second most top 10 hits on the chart since Nielsen Broadcast Data Systems was initiated in 1990. It would go on to reach number 2 for the week of November 25, 2023, behind Morgan Wallen's "Thinkin' Bout Me", and would spend a total of 37 weeks on the chart.

== Charts ==
=== Weekly charts ===
Weekly chart performance for "Standing Room Only"
Chart (2023)	Peak position
Canada Hot 100 (Billboard)	82
Canada Country (Billboard)	3
US Billboard Hot 100	60
US Country Airplay (Billboard)	2
US Hot Country Songs (Billboard)	14

=== Year-end charts ===
Year-end chart performance for "Standing Room Only"
Chart (2023)	Position
US Country Airplay (Billboard)	32
US Hot Country Songs (Billboard)	53

== Certifications ==
Certifications for "Standing Room Only"
Region	Certification	Certified units/sales
Canada (Music Canada)	Gold	40,000^{‡}
^{‡} Sales+streaming figures based on certification alone.
