= Heroes and Villains (band) =

American rock band

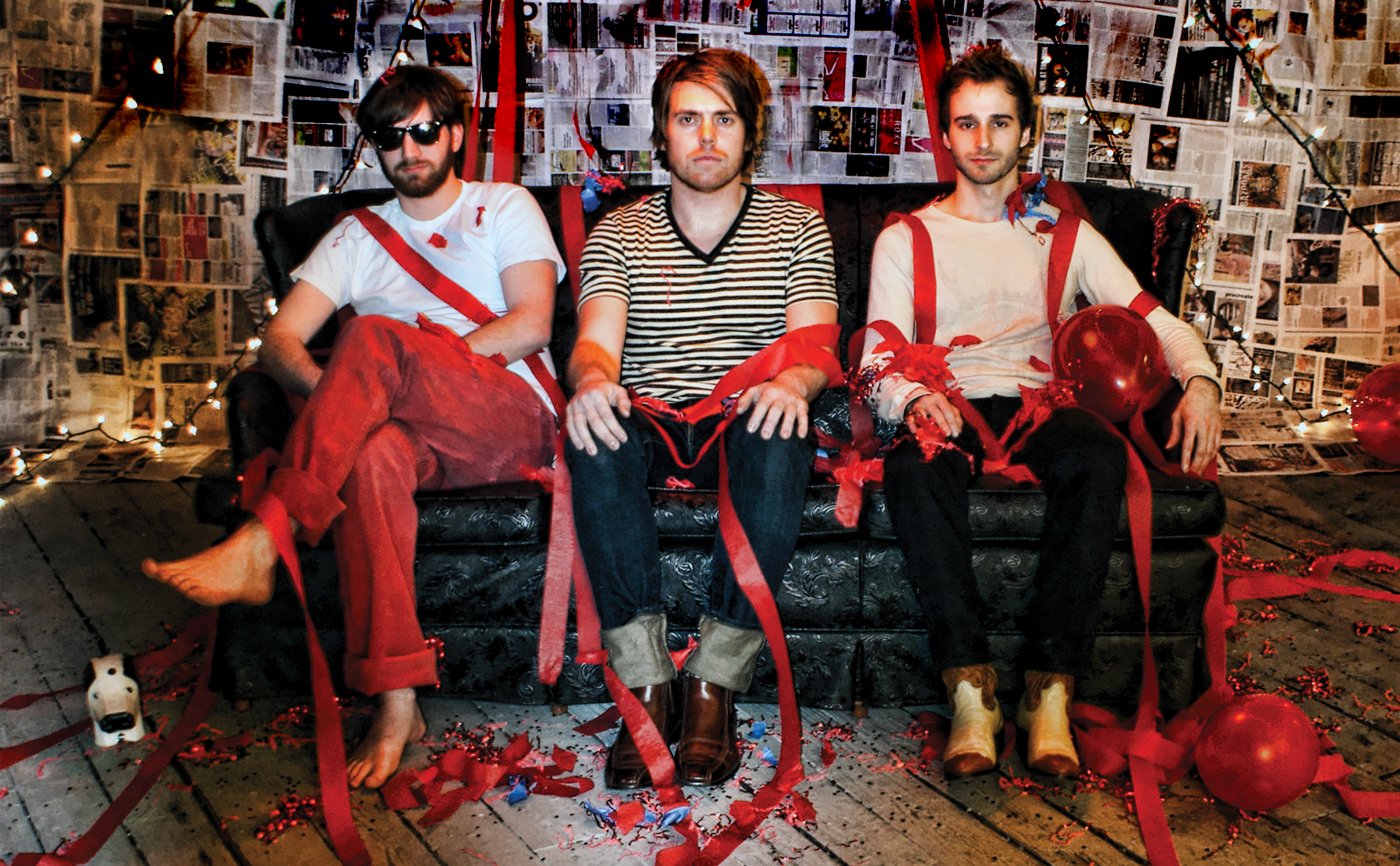

Background information
- Origin: Kansas City, Missouri, United States
- Genres: Indie; Pop; Alternative rock
- Years active: 2006–present
- Members: Ryan Wallace; Cody Stockton; Jason W. Smith
- Website: Official website

Heroes and Villains (alternatively displayed as Heroes+Villains) is an American rock band formed in 2006 in Kansas City, Missouri, United States, consisting of singer and guitarist Ryan Wallace, keyboardist Cody Stockton and percussionist Jason W. Smith.

== History ==
The band originally had four members and was named Walter Alias.

Guitarist Elliot Thurmon left the band in 2008.

Heroes and Villains have released one album and one EP; Examples of the Cataclysmic, released in 2007 under Walter Alias, and Plans In Motion, released March 30, 2010 under Heroes and Villains.

Examples of the Cataclysmic is a full-length album recorded at Awe Struck Studios in Independence, MO with Larry Gann. Gann has worked with such acts as Lit, Elton John, The Goo Goo Dolls and Tim McGraw. The album featured 10 tracks including the first release of "Thin" which received radio play on KRBZ FM 96.5 the Buzz, where they are currently a mainstay. The album garnered enough attention to be reviewed favorably by Kansas City's weekly culture newspaper, The Pitch. The band's second-ever live performance also received acclaims by the Kansas City music writer Jason Harper.

Plans In Motion is a four-song EP entirely independently produced. The album features the single "Second Thoughts" which received airplay at college radio stations across the United States. The EP's title track accompanies a music video directed by Gnarly Enterprises. Kansas City's music writer Elke Mermis reviewed the album on April 22, 2010, giving it high marks.

Heroes and Villains appeared on the Rock Out Reach Out compilation album in 2009.

The band played three shows in Austin, Texas in March 2010 during SXSW for the Redgorilla Music Festival. The band has also performed at the South Park Music Tour in Fairplay, Colorado, the Hyperactive Festival and Conference in Albuquerque, New Mexico, and the PLAY:stl in St. Louis. Heroes and Villains also toured the Southwest and West Coast. The band has shared the stage with other prominent bands including Vedera, The Republic Tigers, Life In Jersey, and the Jimmy Kimmel Live! contest winner Radiant.

In June 2010, the band's video for Plans in Motion was inducted into Fuse TV On-demand. The band was also a featured artist on CMJ's website.

Singer and guitarist Ryan Wallace joined both The Republic Tigers and Jaenki in 2014.

== Discography ==
EPs:

- Plans In Motion. Released March 2010.

LPs:

- Examples of the Cataclysmic. Released as Walter Alias in February 2007.

Compilation albums:

- Rock Out Reach Out. Released December 2009.

== Quotes ==
- “While musical tides ebb and flow, it seems as if Heroes and Villains have planted an impressive anchor. They’re on the horizon line, and they’re making waves….beautiful, cascading, electronic-indie-pop waves.”
- “It's not hard to imagine the quartet's swelling choruses set against some critical moment in a movie.”
- “It amazes me what these guys do as a 3 piece.”
- “It’s big, serious music that fans of Snow Patrol and Vedera should eat the hell up.”
