= Hide and Seek (Severance) =

- Severance episode
- The group visits the O&D department.
- Episode no.: Season 1 Episode 6
- Directed by: Aoife McArdle
- Written by: Amanda Overton
- Cinematography by: Jessica Lee Gagné
- Editing by: Erica Freed Marker; Geoffrey Richman
- Original release date: March 18, 2022
- Running time: 40 minutes

Guest appearances
- Karen Aldridge as Reghabi; Michael Cumpsty as Doug Graner; Nikki M. James as Alexa; Nora Dale as Gabby Arteta

Episode chronology
← Previous "The Grim Barbarity of Optics and Design"	Next → "Defiant Jazz"

"Hide and Seek" is the sixth episode of the first season of the American science fiction psychological thriller television series Severance. The episode was written by producer Amanda Overton, and directed by producer Aoife McArdle. It was released on Apple TV+ on March 18, 2022.

The series follows employees of Lumon Industries, a biotechnology corporation that uses a medical procedure called "severance" to separate the memories of their employees: at work, Lumon employees, called "innies", can't remember anything outside of work. Outside work, Lumon employees, called "outies", can't remember anything about work. As a result, innies and outies experience two different lives, with distinct personalities and agendas. In the episode, Mark tries to form an alliance between MDR and O&D, while Cobel begins to establish stricter measures.

The episode received critical acclaim, with praise for the performances, writing, character development and revelations.

== Plot ==
Graner (Michael Cumpsty) calls Cobel (Patricia Arquette) to inform her that he has identified ex-employee Reghabi as the person responsible for Petey's reintegration. Mark (Adam Scott) returns home and retrieves Petey's phone, throwing the battery in the trash.

Burt (Christopher Walken) takes Irving (John Turturro) to a room full of plants, which he believes they can use just for themselves. Irving admits his feelings for Burt, but says he is not ready to commit to a relationship. Devon (Jen Tullock) runs into Gabby (Nora Dale), the woman she met at the birthing lodge, but Gabby does not recognize her. Devon also meets Gabby's husband, Angelo Arteta, and is confused that Gabby has given her baby a different name than she said she would at the cabin. For failing to watch Helly (Britt Lower), Ms. Casey (Dichen Lachman) is sent to the break room. Mark protests this, and Cobel reprimands him by revoking MDR's hallway privileges, as MDR is behind schedule.

Annoyed, Mark gets Irving to lead them to O&D, unaware that Cobel and Milchick (Tramell Tillman) are watching them. Meeting Burt and his colleagues, Mark calls for the departments to work together to uncover Lumon's secrets. Milchick arrives and forces them to return to MDR; Dylan (Zach Cherry) discreetly steals an ideographic card. For violating the rules, Mark is forced to go to the break room, meeting Ms. Casey on her way out. Devon performs a web search on Angelo, discovering that he is a state senator who advocates for the severance procedure. She and Ricken (Michael Chernus) then meet with their lactation consultant, revealed to be Mrs. Selvig.

Dylan's innie awakens inside his outie's home to find Milchick present. Milchick demands he return the card, which Dylan reveals he hid in the bathroom. Dylan is shocked to discover he has a young son, and Milchick leaves after restoring him to his outie personality. With Graner having found a possible clue into Reghabi's location, Cobel orders a keycard-locked door to be installed at the entrance to MDR. During another date, Mark and Alexa (Nikki M. James) attend a concert in which Petey's daughter's punk rock band perform an anti-Lumon song. The two have sex afterwards. In the middle of the night, Mark decides to fix Petey's phone, which rings again. He answers, and a woman asks to know what Petey told him. When Mark explains he does not know much, she asks to meet with him. He arrives at a university, where the woman asks him to follow her.

== Development ==
=== Production ===
The episode was written by producer Amanda Overton, and directed by producer Aoife McArdle. This marked Overton's first writing credit, and McArdle's third directing credit.

== Critical reception ==
"Hide and Seek" received critical acclaim. Matt Schimkowitz of The A.V. Club gave the episode an "A–" and wrote, "In 'Hide And Seek', Arquette puts forth the iciest, scariest version of Cobel yet. And I'm not just talking about her breaking into a passionate song with lyrics like, 'Kier, chosen one, Kier' while disciplining the MDR crew."

Erin Qualey of Vulture gave the episode a perfect 5 star rating out of 5 and wrote, "This week's episode of Severance provides a huge information dump: context for the inner workings of Lumon, the teachings of Kier, and the evolution of the severance process."

Oliver VanDervoort of Game Rant wrote, "Severance Episode 6, titled 'Hide and Seek' takes the Apple TV Plus series in a direction it hasn't gone before in that it seems as if as much, or more of the action takes place outside the Lumon building than inside. There's still plenty of creepy goings-on inside the building as well but it appears that whatever the company is up to is quite a bit more far reaching than what the audience has had any reason to believe before now. This latest installment in the Apple TV series also adds quite a bit more action and quite a bit more questions than the last several episodes combined." Breeze Riley of Telltale TV gave the episode a 4 star rating out of 5 and wrote, "Who you're supposed to root for on Severance is pretty obvious. So it's frustrating to see their ultimate helplessness after all their attempts at resisting."

Mary Littlejohn of TV Fanatic gave the episode a 4.5 star rating out of 5 and wrote, "It was a typically unsettling episode of Severance, but there was a good balance between the light and dark here." Caemeron Crain of TV Obsessive wrote, "It took until the sixth episode, but Severance has finally shown us the outie version of someone on the MDR team besides Mark, as S1E6 finds Milchick visiting Dylan at home."
