= Standing Room Only (Tim McGraw album) =

Studio album by Tim McGraw
- Released: August 25, 2023
- Studio: Blackbird (Nashville, Tennessee); Essential Sound (Franklin, Tennessee)
- Genre: Country
- Length: 49:50
- Label: Big Machine
- Producer: Byron Gallimore; Tim McGraw

Tim McGraw chronology
McGraw Machine Hits: 2013–2019 (2020)	Standing Room Only (2023)	Poet's Resumé (2023)

Singles from Standing Room Only
- 1. "Standing Room Only" Released: March 10, 2023

Professional ratings
Review scores
Source	Rating
AllMusic	2.5/5 stars

Standing Room Only is the sixteenth studio album by American country music singer Tim McGraw, released through Big Machine Records on August 25, 2023. It was produced by McGraw and Byron Gallimore and preceded by the title track and lead single, "Standing Room Only", as well as the track "Hey Whiskey".

== Background ==
McGraw revealed that he had been working on the album since 2020, and called it "some of the most emotional, thought-provoking, and life-affirming music I've ever recorded".

== Track listing ==
Standing Room Only track listing
No.	Title	Writer(s)	Length
1.	"Hold On to It"	Ryan Larkins; Seth Mosley; Jimmy Yeary	3:11
2.	"Standing Room Only"	Craig Wiseman; Tommy Cecil; Patrick Murphy	3:46
3.	"Paper Umbrellas"	Monty Criswell; Drake Milligan	3:30
4.	"Remember Me Well"	Heather Morgan; Jimmy Robbins	3:49
5.	"Hey Whiskey"	Brad Hutsell; Joel Hutsell; Brad Warren; Brett Warren	3:23
6.	"Her"	Jason Gantt; Tim Nichols; Yeary	3:57
7.	"Fool Me Again"	Kameron Marlowe; Brad Warren; Brett Warren; Rob Williford	3:22
8.	"Small Town King"	Jaren Johnston; Jenn Schott; Jeremy Stover	4:17
9.	"Beautiful Hurricane"	Mike Lane; Tony Lane	3:45
10.	"Cowboy Junkie"	Bill Luther; Lance Miller; Justin Weaver	3:49
11.	"Nashville CA/L.A. Tennessee" (featuring Lori McKenna)	Tim McGraw; Lori McKenna; Bob Minner	3:41
12.	"Some Songs Change Your World"	Mark Irwin; Josh Kear; Miller	5:17
13.	"Letter from Heaven"	Chase McGill; McKenna; Parker Welling	4:03
Total length:			49:50

== Personnel ==
Musicians

- Tim McGraw – vocals
- Paul Bushnell – bass guitar (all tracks); keyboards, piano (12)
- Shannon Forrest – drum programming, drums, percussion
- Charlie Judge – keyboards, piano
- Jamie Muhoberac – keyboards, piano
- Dan Dugmore – steel guitar
- Greg Barnhill – background vocals (1–10, 12, 13)
- Ilya Toshinskiy – acoustic guitar (1–3, 5, 7, 8, 13), banjo (8, 10, 11)
- Adam Schoenfeld – electric guitar (1, 2, 4, 7, 9–11, 13)
- Dave Levita – electric guitar (1–6, 8, 12, 13)
- Michael Landau – electric guitar (1–3, 5–13)
- Byron Gallimore – keyboards, piano (1, 2, 4, 10, 11, 13); electric guitar (3, 11), acoustic guitar (6)
- Troy Lancaster – electric guitar (3, 5, 6, 12)
- Larry Franklin – fiddle (3)
- B. James Lowry – acoustic guitar (4, 9–11)
- Sol Littlefield – electric guitar (4, 7–11)
- Danny Rader – acoustic guitar (6, 12)
- Aubrey Haynie – fiddle (9)
- Lori McKenna – background vocals (11)

Technical

- Tim McGraw – production
- Byron Gallimore – production, mixing
- Adam Ayan – mastering
- Eric Lutkins – engineering, mixing assistance
- Shannon Forest – engineering

== Charts ==
Chart performance for Standing Room Only
Chart (2023)	Peak position
Australian Albums (ARIA)	99
Australian Country Albums (ARIA)	13
Scottish Albums (OCC)	35
Swiss Albums (Schweizer Hitparade)	67
UK Album Downloads (OCC)	25
UK Country Albums (OCC)	4
US Billboard 200	75
US Top Country Albums (Billboard)	17
