= One Bad Habit (song) =

Single by Tim McGraw

from the EP Poet's Resumé
- Released: January 22, 2024
- Genre: Country
- Length: 3:12
- Label: Big Machine
- Songwriters: Marc Beeson; Aaron Eshuis; Tony Lane
- Producers: Byron Gallimore; Tim McGraw

Tim McGraw singles chronology
"Standing Room Only" (2023)	"One Bad Habit" (2024)	"Paper Umbrellas" (2025)

"One Bad Habit" is a song by American country music singer Tim McGraw, written by Marc Beeson, Aaron Eshuis, and Tony Lane. It was released on January 22, 2024, as the lead single from his 2023 EP Poet's Resumé.

== History and content ==
McGraw released an extended play titled Poet's Resumé in late 2023, on which "One Bad Habit" and five other songs were included.

In an interview with radio host Lon Helton, McGraw said that he and his touring band came up with a "groove" that he liked, as they recorded the song at a faster tempo than its demo. He also talked about the song's theme of "bad habits" between a husband and wife.

The song's music video features a variety of home videos and photographs of McGraw with his wife, Faith Hill.

== Charts ==
=== Weekly charts ===
Weekly chart performance for "One Bad Habit"
Chart (2024)	Peak position
US Bubbling Under Hot 100 (Billboard)	2
US Country Airplay (Billboard)	5
US Hot Country Songs (Billboard)	26

=== Year-end charts ===
2024 year-end chart performance for "One Bad Habit"
Chart (2024)	Position
US Country Airplay (Billboard)	40
