= Made from the Dirt =

Studio album by Kassi Ashton
- Released: September 20, 2024
- Genre: Country
- Length: 36:15
- Label: MCA Nashville; Interscope Records
- Producer: Kassi Ashton; Oscar Charles; Luke Laird

Singles from Made from the Dirt
- 1. "Drive You Out of My Mind" Released: March 13, 2023; 2. "Called Crazy" Released: May 6, 2024

Made from the Dirt is the debut studio album by American country music artist Kassi Ashton. It was released on September 20, 2024, through a joint partnership between MCA Nashville and Interscope Records. It includes the singles "Drive You Out of My Mind" and "Called Crazy". A deluxe re-issue of the album, titled Made from the Dirt: The Blooms, was released on April 25, 2025.

== Background ==
Ashton, who studied at Nashville's Belmont University, landed a publishing deal in 2016, and subsequently signed a recording contract in a joint partnership with Universal Music Group and Interscope Records the following year. After a string of standalone single releases and delays due to the COVID-19 pandemic, "Dates in Pickup Trucks" was ultimately released as Ashton's debut to country radio in 2022, though it was not included on the album, and the album was released seven years after initially signing her record deal.

== Content ==
Ashton wrote or co-wrote all 10 tracks on Made from the Dirt, and co-produced the album with Luke Laird, with additional production on select tracks from Oscar Charles and Todd Clark. On April 25, 2025, the album was re-issued as Made from the Dirt: The Blooms, expanding the album to 15 tracks.

Described as equal parts "grunge and glamour", Ashton came up with the album title while watching a live feed of a couture fashion show and it was inspired by the duality of her upbringing that found the singer "celebrat[ing] the unique incongruities that have shaped her thus far", and the cover artwork features her wearing an outfit that she made herself. Ashton wrote the title track because "we are made all the better every time we get back up. We are more beautiful because of the scars, stories, and bulls***. I hope after listening down, you feel seen, you feel validated, and you feel like the baddest to ever do it". In creating the album, Ashton cited musical influence from the likes of Stevie Nicks, Eric Church, and Chris Stapleton, among others, and set out with no theme in mind, instead opting to just be vulnerable, collaborating with well-known songwriters such as Lori McKenna, Rhett Akins, and Luke Laird.

== Singles ==
"Drive You Out of My Mind" was released as the album's lead single in March 2023, pulling in first-week adds from 42 stations. It reached a peak of number 42 on the Billboard Country Airplay chart in September 2023. "Called Crazy" was issued as the second single on May 6, 2024. Ashton was chosen as Audacy, Inc.'s 'Launch' Artist, lending additional platform support to "Called Crazy". It debuted at number 53 on Billboard Country Airplay ahead of its release as a single, and pulled in adds from 43 stations by its impact date. It became her first song to enter the top 40 of the chart in its seventh chart week, and reached a peak of number 32 in August 2024.

"Son of a Gun", "The Straw", and "I Don't Wanna Dance" were also released as promotional singles leading up to the album release. "Son of a Gun" is described as her origin story, with Ashton drawing inspiration from the way her parents met.

On February 28, 2025, "Sounds Like Something I'd Say" was released as a promotional single alongside the announcement of the album's deluxe edition. The track is a duet with Parker McCollum.

== Track listing ==
Made from the Dirt track listing
No.	Title	Writer(s)	Producer	Length
1.	"Made from the Dirt"	Kassi Ashton; Oscar Charles; Luke Laird	Ashton; Charles; Laird	3:31
2.	"Called Crazy"	Ashton; Jared Keim; Emily Weisband	Ashton; Laird	3:19
3.	"Son of a Gun"	Ashton; Jason Nix; Driver Williams	Ashton; Laird	3:23
4.	"I Don't Wanna Dance"	Ashton; Charles; Emily Landis	Ashton; Charles; Laird	3:17
5.	"The Straw"	Ashton; Laird; Lori McKenna	Ashton; Laird	4:04
6.	"Angels Smoke Cigarettes"	Ashton; Barry Dean; Laird; McKenna	Ashton; Laird	4:01
7.	"The Stars Know"	Ashton; Rhett Akins; Laird	Ashton; Laird	3:19
8.	"Drive You Out of My Mind"	Ashton; Todd Clark; Travis Wood	Ashton; Clark; Laird	3:32
9.	"'Til the Lights Go Out"	Ashton; Charles; Natalie Hemby	Ashton; Charles; Laird	3:42
10.	"Juanita"	Ashton	Ashton; Laird	4:03
Total length:				36:15

Made from the Dirt: The Blooms
No.	Title	Writer(s)	Producer	Length
1.	"Made from the Dirt"	Ashton; Charles; Laird	Ashton; Charles; Laird	3:31
2.	"Ride or Die Radio"	Ashton; Charles; Laird	Ashton; Charles; Laird	3:50
3.	"Called Crazy"	Ashton; Keim; Weisband	Ashton; Laird	3:19
4.	"Son of a Gun"	Ashton; Nix; Williams	Ashton; Laird	3:23
5.	"I Don't Wanna Dance"	Ashton; Charles; Landis	Ashton; Charles; Laird	3:17
6.	"The Straw"	Ashton; Laird; McKenna	Ashton; Laird	4:04
7.	"Sounds Like Something I'd Say" (with Parker McCollum)	Ashton; Dean; Jon Randall	Ashton; Laird	3:20
8.	"Angels Smoke Cigarettes"	Ashton; Dean; Laird; McKenna	Ashton; Laird	4:01
9.	"All Over You"	Ashton; Keim; Anna Vaus	Ashton; Laird	3:17
10.	"The Stars Know"	Ashton; Akins; Laird	Ashton; Laird	3:19
11.	"When I'm Gone"	Ashton; Jeff Hyde; Ryan Tyndell	Ashton; Laird	3:02
12.	"Bar Fight"	Ashton; Sarah Buxton; Michael Lotten	Ashton; Charles; Laird	3:06
13.	"Drive You Out of My Mind"	Ashton; Clark; Wood	Ashton; Clark; Laird	3:32
14.	"'Til the Lights Go Out"	Ashton; Charles; Hemby	Ashton; Charles; Laird	3:42
15.	"Juanita"	Ashton	Ashton; Laird	4:03
Total length:				52:53
