= Live from Sound City =

Studio album by Parker McCollum
- Released: October 13, 2026
- Recorded: July 6–9, 2026
- Studio: Sound City (Los Angeles)
- Genre: Country
- Length: 54:27
- Label: MCA Nashville
- Producers: Frank Liddell; Eric Masse

Parker McCollum chronology
Parker McCollum (2025)	Live from Sound City (2026)

Live from Sound City is the sixth studio album by American country music artist Parker McCollum. The album was released on October 13, 2026, via MCA Nashville. The album is an acoustic album that features seven original songs, two cover songs, and six re-recordings.

== Background and recording ==
McCollum initially teased that he wanted to work on an acoustic album in 2022 on Twitter. He further discussed recording one in a 2024 interview with Holler. In July 2026, he posted on Instagram with the caption: "LA bound. 4 days recording an acoustic album for you guys. No idea where this is about to go. We will find the edge," confirming that he was recording the album. Little updates followed the initial announcement, with the album being officially announced on October 12, 2026, the day before it was released.

The album features six re-recordings of some of his biggest hits, including "To Be Loved by You" and "Handle on You", two covers: "Diamonds and Gasoline" by the Turnpike Troubadours and "Ellis Unit One" by Steve Earle, and seven new songs, including "Jet Plane to GA", which was teased in November 2025.

== Track listing ==
No.	Title	Writer(s)	Length
1.	"One Less Mouth"	Parker McCollum	3:03
2.	"Far, Far Away"	McCollum	3:34
3.	"To Be Loved by You"	McCollum; Rhett Akins	3:40
4.	"Handle on You"	McCollum; Monty Criswell	3:33
5.	"'Til the End"	McCollum	4:30
6.	"Solid Country Gold"	McCollum; Jon Randall; Brad Warren; Brett Warren	2:49
7.	"Things Are Looking Up"	McCollum	2:43
8.	"Diamonds and Gasoline"	Evan Felker	3:32
9.	"Hope That I'm Enough"	McCollum; Jessi Alexander; Matt Jenkins	3:36
10.	"Better Alone"	McCollum; Lori McKenna; Summer Overstreet	3:41
11.	"Kill Me Now"	McCollum; Tucker Beathard; Lee Thomas Miller	5:00
12.	"Ellis Unit One"	Steve Earle	4:00
13.	"Jet Plane to GA"	McCollum; Charlie Magnone; Jarrod Morris	3:17
14.	"Permanent Headphones"	McCollum	3:37
15.	"South of the City Lights"	McCollum	3:52
Total length:			54:27

== Personnel ==
Credits adapted from Tidal.

=== Musicians ===
- Parker McCollum – lead vocals, acoustic guitar, harmonica
- Charlie Magnone – piano (track 13)

=== Technical ===
- Frank Liddell – production
- Eric Masse – production, mixing, recording
- Stephen Marcussen – mastering
- Gregg White – recording, assistant engineer
- Brittany Hamlin – production coordinator
