= Pretty Heart =

Single by Parker McCollum

from the album Gold Chain Cowboy
- Released: April 27, 2020
- Genre: Neotraditional country
- Length: 4:19
- Label: MCA Nashville
- Songwriters: Parker McCollum; Randy Montana
- Producer: Jon Randall

Parker McCollum singles chronology
"Misunderstood" (2019)	"Pretty Heart" (2020)	"To Be Loved by You" (2021)

Music video
- "Pretty Heart" on YouTube

"Pretty Heart" is a song by American country music singer Parker McCollum. It was released on April 27, 2020, as the first single from his debut studio album Gold Chain Cowboy and was previously featured on his 2020 extended play Hollywood Gold. McCollum wrote the song with Randy Montana.

== History ==
McCollum first came up with the lyric "What does that say about me/That I could love somebody like you" in 2014, and posted a clip of himself singing the lyric on his Instagram account. Four years later, he presented the clip to Randy Montana during a songwriting session, and the two changed it to "What does that say about me/I could do you like I did". According to Montana, the song is about "a guy kind of being vulnerable" and "down on himself" because he caused his relationship to end unfavorably. After the song was completed and McCollum had signed to MCA Nashville, representatives of the label encouraged him to record it as one of four songs in his first recording session for the label, with Jon Randall producing. Among the contributing musicians are Rob McNelley on slide guitar and Jedd Hughes on resonator guitar.

== Critical reception ==
Billboard writer Tom Roland said that the song features "swamp-rock slide guitar and the jumble of torment and bravado embedded in McCollum’s vocal performance". Taste of Country writer Billy Dukes said that "puts his torment on display over a plodding arrangement of drums and guitars. The slide guitar licks that color the mix pull this lyric safely into 'real country' territory". He praised McCollum's "sharp songwriting and storytelling" as well.

== Chart performance ==
Due to a heavy amount of online streaming, the song had already charted on Hot Country Songs before MCA officially released it as a single.

=== Weekly charts ===
Chart (2020–2021)	Peak position
Canada Hot 100 (Billboard)	70
Canada Country (Billboard)	10
Texas Regional (Billboard)	1
US Billboard Hot 100	36
US Country Airplay (Billboard)	1
US Hot Country Songs (Billboard)	4

=== Year-end charts ===
Chart (2020)	Position
US Country Airplay (Billboard)	41
US Hot Country Songs (Billboard)	30

Chart (2021)	Position
US Country Airplay (Billboard)	59
US Hot Country Songs (Billboard)	63

== Certifications ==
Region	Certification	Certified units/sales
Canada (Music Canada)	Gold	40,000^{‡}
United States (RIAA)	4× Platinum	4,000,000^{‡}
^{‡} Sales+streaming figures based on certification alone.
