= Gold Chain Cowboy =

Studio album by Parker McCollum
- Released: July 30, 2021
- Studio: Southern Ground (Nashville); Blackbird Studios (Nashville); Addiction Sound Studios (Nashville); Sound Stage Studios (Nashville); The Cabin Studio (Nashville); Galt Line Studio (Nashville)
- Genre: Neotraditional country
- Length: 33:37
- Label: MCA Nashville
- Producer: Jon Randall

Parker McCollum chronology
Hollywood Gold (2020)	Gold Chain Cowboy (2021)	Never Enough (2023)

Singles from Gold Chain Cowboy
- 1. "Pretty Heart" Released: April 27, 2020; 2. "To Be Loved by You" Released: January 25, 2021

Gold Chain Cowboy is the third studio album by American country music singer Parker McCollum. It was released through MCA Nashville on July 30, 2021, It was produced by Jon Randall and includes the number one singles "Pretty Heart" and "To Be Loved by You".

== Content ==
Gold Chain Cowboy was confirmed for release in mid-2021. The album consists of ten songs, all of which McCollum co-wrote. Prior to the album's release, "Pretty Heart" and "To Be Loved by You" were both issued as singles. Jon Randall produced the album.

== Critical reception ==
Markos Papadatos of Digital Journal rated the album 4.5 out of 5 stars, stating that "There is a rawness and honesty to McCollum’s music. This album will resonate well with both fans of neotraditional and modern country."

== Track listing ==
No.	Title	Writer(s)	Length
1.	"Wait Outside"	Parker McCollum; Jon Randall; Randy Rogers	3:21
2.	"Dallas" (featuring Danielle Bradbery)	Wade Bowen; McCollum; Rogers	3:30
3.	"To Be Loved by You"	McCollum; Rhett Akins	3:19
4.	"Drinkin'"	McCollum; Lee Thomas Miller	3:14
5.	"Falling Apart"	McCollum; Randall; Rogers; Miranda Lambert	3:10
6.	"Heart Like Mine"	McCollum; Tony Lane; Ben West	3:32
7.	"Why Indiana"	McCollum; Randy Montana; Erik Dylan	3:31
8.	"Rest of My Life"	McCollum	2:54
9.	"Pretty Heart"	McCollum; Montana	4:05
10.	"Never Loved You at All"	Corey Crowder; Brian Kelley; McCollum	3:01

Special Edition and Apple Music Up Next Film Edition bonus track
No.	Title	Writer(s)	Length
11.	"Blanco County Rain"	Brad Clawson; McCollum; Montana	3:39
Total length:			37:21

== Personnel ==
Adapted from liner notes.

Musicians

- Stanton Adcock – acoustic guitar (track 7), electric guitar (tracks 3, 7)
- Jessi Alexander – background vocals (track 6)
- Doug Belote – drums (tracks 3, 4, 6, 7), percussion (tracks 4, 7)
- Danielle Bradbery – featured vocals (track 2)
- John Cowan – background vocals (tracks 3, 4)
- Dan Dugmore – pedal steel guitar (track 4)
- Shani Gandhi – keyboards (track 4), background vocals (track 4)
- Jedd Hughes – acoustic guitar (tracks 2, 4–6, 8, 9), electric guitar (tracks 5, 6)
- Tony Lucido – bass guitar (tracks 1, 10), gang vocals (track 10)
- Parker McCollum – harmonica (track 8), lead vocals (all tracks)
- Rob McNelley – acoustic guitar (track 10), electric guitar (all tracks except 10), gang vocals (track 10)
- Alena Moran – gang vocals (track 10)
- Lex Price – bass guitar (tracks 3, 4, 7)
- Jon Randall – electric guitar (track 6), background vocals (tracks 1, 3–5, 7, 9, 10)
- Jerry Roe – bass guitar (tracks 2, 5, 8, 9), drums (tracks 1, 2, 5, 8–10), percussion (tracks 1, 2, 8–10), gang vocals (track 10)
- Marc Rogers – bass guitar (track 6)
- F. Reid Shippen – programming (track 5)
- Bryan Sutton – acoustic guitar (tracks 1, 10), mandolin (track 1), gang vocals (track 10)
- Jimmy Wallace – Hammond B-3 organ (tracks 1, 2), keyboards (all tracks), gang vocals (track 10)
- Brian Wright – gang vocals (track 10)

Production

- Jon Randall – production
- F. Reid Shippen – engineering, mixing
- Brandon Bell – engineering, digital editing
- Shani Gandhi – additional engineering, digital editing
- Michael Mechling – assistant engineering, digital editing
- Lowel Reynolds – assistant engineering
- Ethan Barrette – assistant engineering
- Alena Moran – production coordination
- Pete Lyman – mastering

Artwork

- Parker McCollum – art direction
- Tyler Conrad – cover design and photography
- Craig Allen – design
- Kera Jackson – art production

== Charts ==
=== Weekly charts ===
Weekly chart performance for Gold Chain Cowboy
Chart (2021)	Peak position
US Billboard 200	60
US Top Country Albums (Billboard)	6

=== Year-end charts ===
2022 year-end chart performance for Gold Chain Cowboy
Chart (2022)	Position
US Top Country Albums (Billboard)	53

== Certifications ==
Region	Certification	Certified units/sales
United States (RIAA)	Gold	500,000^{‡}
^{‡} Sales+streaming figures based on certification alone.
