= Defiant Jazz =

- Severance episode
- Dylan’s colleagues hold him back after he attacks Mr. Milchick.
- Episode no.: Season 1 Episode 7
- Directed by: Ben Stiller
- Written by: Helen Leigh
- Cinematography by: Jessica Lee Gagné
- Editing by: Geoffrey Richman
- Original release date: March 25, 2022
- Running time: 49 minutes

Guest appearances
- Sydney Cole Alexander as Natalie; Karen Aldridge as Reghabi; Michael Cumpsty as Doug Graner; Nikki M. James as Alexa

Episode chronology
← Previous "Hide and Seek"	Next → "What's for Dinner?"

"Defiant Jazz" is the seventh episode of the first season of the American science fiction psychological thriller television series Severance. The episode was written by Helen Leigh, and directed by executive producer Ben Stiller. It was released on Apple TV+ on March 25, 2022.

The series follows employees of Lumon Industries, a biotechnology corporation that uses a medical procedure called "severance" to separate the memories of their employees: at work, Lumon employees, called "innies", can't remember anything outside of work. Outside work, Lumon employees, called "outies", can't remember anything about work. As a result, innies and outies experience two different lives, with distinct personalities and agendas. In the episode, Mark's outie meets with Petey's contact, while the situation in Lumon intensifies after Dylan's incident.

The episode received critical acclaim, with critics praising the performances (particularly John Turturro), writing, themes, and ending. For the episode, Turturro received a nomination for Outstanding Supporting Actor in a Drama Series at the 74th Primetime Emmy Awards.

== Plot ==
Reghabi (Karen Aldridge) takes Mark (Adam Scott) to her hideout inside the university, explaining that she helped Petey achieve reintegration. She also affirms that Petey's death was due to him not following her instructions, and that she is responsible for implanting Mark's severance chip as well. She offers to remove his chip, but Mark hesitates over what his innie wants.

Their encounter is interrupted by Graner (Michael Cumpsty), who introduces himself as Mark's colleague. However, Reghabi beats him to death with a baseball bat and gets Mark to help move the body. She gives Graner's access card to Mark, telling him his innie will know what to do with it. The following day, Mark's innie is surprised when he finds the card, and discovers that the MDR office has been locked from the hallway. Dylan (Zach Cherry) confronts Milchick (Tramell Tillman) for awakening him outside, and Milchick explains it was an emergency protocol known as an "overtime contingency." Dylan asks about his son, and Milchick confirms he exists but asks him not to disclose it to his co-workers. Milchick also finds the ideographic card that Dylan took and gives it back to Burt (Christopher Walken).

Milchick gifts a "Music Dance Experience" to MDR as a prize for Helly (Britt Lower) achieving a threshold in refinement. While everyone dances, Dylan refuses to participate. Enraged that he cannot know anything about his son, Dylan physically attacks Milchick, who angrily leaves to report the incident to Cobel (Patricia Arquette). Dylan tells his team about the overtime contingency. When Mark shows them Graner's card, they decide that they should find the security office, where Lumon can awaken their innies in the outside world.

During a session, Devon (Jen Tullock) tells Mrs. Selvig that she suspects Gabby severed her memories to avoid the pains of childbirth, and they talk about Mark's grief after the death of his wife Gemma; Cobel asks whether Mark ever thought he saw Gemma after her death. When she returns to her office, Cobel is informed of Graner's death, which she suspects might be linked to the person responsible for Petey's reintegration.

Mark and Helly scheme to locate the security office; inside, they find Lumon strictly monitors all of its employees, and Helly retrieves a page from the manual. With the page, they find that the overtime contingency is activated using two switches that are far enough apart to require two people. Irving (John Turturro) visits O&D to see Burt but finds that Milchick has organized a retirement party for him. Milchick shows Burt a video where his outie expresses his gratitude to his innie colleagues even though he does not know anything about them. Irving openly berates the non-severed Milchick for his celebratory attitude when retirement means the end of Burt's innie. Upon Burt's insistence, Milchick reluctantly allows Irving to stay at the party. When Irving returns to his cubicle, he tells Mark, Helly and Dylan that he wants to fight back against Lumon.

That night, a drunk Mark is visited by Alexa (Nikki M. James), who had left her phone behind. When Alexa tells him he is not ready for a relationship, Mark finds and tears up a picture of Gemma, prompting Alexa to leave. Mark reassembles the photo, revealing his wife to be Ms. Casey (Dichen Lachman).

== Development ==
=== Production ===
The episode was written by Helen Leigh, and directed by executive producer Ben Stiller. This marked Leigh's first writing credit, and Stiller's fourth directing credit.

Creator Dan Erickson considered cutting the dance sequence during the scripting stage. He had another team building activity in mind of a "touch tank" similar to a Halloween haunted house gag in which participants feel a bowl of spaghetti and other items, but said that this was discarded because "there was so much confusion over what the hell I was talking about." Stiller and producer Mark Friedman convinced him to keep the dance sequence in. The dance sequence was shot on Steadicam in order to make the sequence feel like a music video.

The episode contains more violence than the preceding episodes. Stiller said there was discussion about how to have Graner attacked in a way that would feel "messy and shocking," but also believable. A baseball bat was chosen as Stiller wanted to avoid any "cloak and dagger stuff." Adam Scott described Dylan tackling and biting Milchick as the result of a primal shift after learning he is a father.

== Critical reception ==
"Defiant Jazz" received critical acclaim. Matt Schimkowitz of The A.V. Club gave the episode an "A" and wrote, "In this episode, Mrs. Selvig tries to ascertain out of Devon if Mark ever 'sees' his spouse, which puts her secret experiments with Ms. Casey in perspective. So even in giving us a morsel of an answer, Severance has further jumbled up things."

Erin Qualey of Vulture gave the episode a perfect 5 star rating out of 5 and wrote, "Even though the outies may not remember the days in their windowless cubicles, their innies are, for all intents and purposes, still versions of them. This week, Severance drives this point home in several different ways."

Oliver VanDervoort of Game Rant wrote, "Things are really starting to hit the fan in the latest episode of the Apple TV Plus series Severance. In fact, it appears that the hold Lumon has had on the company's Innies for years is finally fraying to the point of breaking and at least in part, that control is slipping for reasons it usually does." Breeze Riley of Telltale TV gave the episode a 4.5 star rating out of 5 and wrote, "Severance consistently provides thrills and twists, but Severance Season 1 Episode 7, 'Defiant Jazz', really pushes at the emotional aspect of the show. The closer the lives of the innies come to being self-actualized, the higher the emotional stakes."

Mary Littlejohn of TV Fanatic gave the episode a 4 star rating out of 5 and wrote, "On Severance Season 1 Episode 7, things get heavy and philosophical thanks to the brief introduction of Rugabe, the woman who administered the severance procedure and now is responsible for reintegration." Caemeron Crain of TV Obsessive wrote, "As the questions around how the severance procedure works and what Lumon is doing become more sprawling, I find myself somewhat disappointed that the questions of personal identity at the heart of Severance aren't being better explored. Is innie Mark the same person as outie Mark, or not, for example? And how should our ethical judgments cut in, either way?"

=== Awards and accolades ===
John Turturro submitted the episode to support his nomination for Outstanding Supporting Actor in a Drama Series at the 74th Primetime Emmy Awards. He would lose to Matthew Macfadyen for Succession.
