= Kassi Ashton =

American singer-songwriter

- Born: Kassi Brechell Meisenheimer; February 3, 1994 (age 32); California, Missouri, United States
- Genre: Country
- Occupation: Singer-songwriter
- Instruments: Vocals, guitar
- Years active: 2017–present
- Labels: MCA Nashville; Interscope Records
- Website: kassiashton.com

Kassi Ashton (born Kassi Brechell Meisenheimer; February 3, 1994) is an American country music singer-songwriter from California, Missouri signed to MCA Nashville and Interscope Records.

== Background ==
Kassi Ashton signed a joint recording deal with UMG Nashville and Interscope in December 2017. Her first promotional single with the MCA Nashville imprint was named after her hometown ("California, Missouri") and released in January 2018. The label issued several promotional singles over the next four years, until "Dates in Pickup Trucks", which was serviced to country radio on February 28, 2022, as Ashton's debut single. It reached a peak of number 57 on the Billboard Country Airplay chart. On March 13, 2023, "Drive You Out of My Mind" was released as her second single, which peaked at number 42 on the Billboard Country Airplay chart in September. Ashton made her debut on the Grand Ole Opry on March 15, 2023.

"Called Crazy" debuted at number 53 on Billboard Country Airplay, Ashton was chosen as Audacy, Inc.'s 'Launch' Artist for her third single "Called Crazy", which became her first top 40 hit on the Billboard Country Airplay chart. Ashton's debut studio album, Made from the Dirt, was released on September 20, 2024.

== Discography ==
=== Studio albums ===
List of studio albums, with selected details, chart positions and sales
Title	Album details
Made from the Dirt	Release date: September 20, 2024; Label: MCA Nashville/Interscope Records; Format: CD, digital download, LP

=== Singles ===
List of singles, with selected chart positions
Title	Year	Peak chart positions	Album
Title	Year	US Country Airplay	Album
"Dates in Pickup Trucks"	2022	57	Non-album single
"Drive You Out of My Mind"	2023	42	Made from the Dirt
"Called Crazy"	2024	32	Made from the Dirt

== Other album appearances ==
List of other album appearances, showing year released, other artists, and album name
Title	Year	Other artist(s)	Album	Ref.
"Drop Top"	2018	Keith Urban	Graffiti U	
