= Burn It Down (Parker McCollum song) =

2023 single by Parker McCollum

Single by Parker McCollum

from the album Never Enough
- Released: June 19, 2023
- Genre: Country
- Length: 3:53 (album version); 3:36 (radio edit)
- Label: MCA Nashville
- Songwriters: Parker McCollum; Hillary Lindsey; Lori McKenna; Liz Rose
- Producer: Jon Randall

Parker McCollum singles chronology
"Handle on You" (2022)	"Burn It Down" (2023)	"What Kinda Man" (2024)

Music video
- "Burn It Down" on YouTube

"Burn It Down" is a song by American country music singer Parker McCollum. It was released on June 19, 2023, as the second single from his fourth studio album Never Enough. The song was written by McCollum and the Love Junkies (Hillary Lindsey, Lori McKenna and Liz Rose) and produced by Jon Randall.

== Background ==
During a writing session that Parker McCollum hosted at his Nashville home on September 27, 2022, he confided to Liz Rose that he did not feel like writing anything. When he and the Love Junkies began their session, they spent about half an hour talking and strumming guitars. McCollum developed a groove and repeated the phrase "burn it down", eventually filling in extra lines after each repetition.

They wrote much of the chorus, before shifting back to the beginning and working on the verses, and made a guitar/vocal work tape at the end of the session. Hillary Lindsey provided harmony, singing "burn it, burn it" ahead of the third chorus. McCollum brought the recording to Jon Randall, who helped with the instrumental along with session player Jedd Hughes and engineer F. Reid Shippen.

== Composition ==
The song is about a person ending a relationship with a former significant other and removing everything that brings to mind the good times they had together. The narrator is in a house full of said memories; in the first verse, the goodbye is scattered across the lawn, while the second verse focuses on the bed and its related feelings. More than two minutes through the song, a guitar solo is played.

== Music video ==
An official music video was released on May 12, 2023. Directed by Dustin Haney and filmed in the desert of New Mexico, it opens with Parker McCollum wandering in the desert. As the guitar solo starts, he is seen performing with a band, with pyrotechnics in the background.

== Charts ==
=== Weekly charts ===
Weekly chart performance for "Burn It Down"
Chart (2023–2024)	Peak position
Australia Country Hot 50 (The Music)	23
Canada Country (Billboard)	4
UK Country Airplay (Radiomonitor)	1
US Billboard Hot 100	42
US Country Airplay (Billboard)	1
US Hot Country Songs (Billboard)	7

=== Year-end charts ===
2024 year-end chart performance for "Burn It Down"
Chart (2024)	Position
US Billboard Hot 100	84
US Country Airplay (Billboard)	26
US Hot Country Songs (Billboard)	24

== Certifications ==
Certifications for "Burn It Down"
Region	Certification	Certified units/sales
United States (RIAA)	Platinum	1,000,000^{‡}
^{‡} Sales+streaming figures based on certification alone.
