= Hollywood Gold =

EP by Parker McCollum
- Released: October 16, 2020
- Genre: Country
- Length: 21:28
- Label: MCA Nashville
- Producer: Jon Randall

Parker McCollum chronology
Probably Wrong (2017)	Hollywood Gold (2020)	Gold Chain Cowboy (2021)

Hollywood Gold is the fourth EP by American country music artist Parker McCollum. It was released on October 16, 2020, by MCA Nashville. It was produced by Jon Randall and was McCollum's first major-label release.

The EP marked a rise in McCollum's success with his first number one single, "Pretty Heart," (Note: "Pretty Heart" was released as a single before the EP released, but was released as a single to his next album, Gold Chain Cowboy.) topping Billboard's Country Airplay. Alongside the song's individual success, Hollywood Gold charted on the Billboard 200 at 99 and on the Top Country Albums at 10.

== History ==
The title Hollywood Gold is a reference to a racehorse once owned by McCollum's grandfather, which McCollum learned more about while listening to a story from his grandmother.

In addition to previously released "Pretty Heart" and "Young Man's Blues," the EP also includes "Like a Cowboy," a track co-written by Chris Stapleton and Al Anderson in the early 2000s. Other tracks include "Hallie Ray Light," "Hold Me Back," and "Love You Like That," the latter co-written with Billy Montana and Jon Randall. McCollum called the project his best songwriting to date and expressed excitement for fans to hear it.

== Critical reception ==
Professional ratings
Review scores
Source	Rating
AllMusic	3/5 stars

Hollywood Gold received positive reviews from critics, who praised its balance between commercial polish and McCollum's red dirt roots. Stephen Thomas Erlewine wrote that the EP's title evokes glamour and mainstream ambition, while the music itself avoids the trappings of a major-label "sell-out" and instead presents a "glossy, full realization" of McCollum's Texas country sound.

Billboard noted, "McCollum's voice is twangy and strong and the Texan's songwriting really stands out. There's nothing cookie-cutter about these songs." American Songwriter also stated, "Parker McCollum shines bright on his new EP Hollywood Gold."

== Commercial and chart performance ==
Hollywood Gold became the highest-selling major-label debut EP in 2020 and debuted at number 10 on the Billboard Top Country Albums.

== Track listing ==
No.	Title	Writer(s)	Length
1.	"Young Man's Blues"	Parker McCollum; Randy Montana	3:27
2.	"Like a Cowboy"	Al Anderson; Chris Stapleton	3:45
3.	"Pretty Heart"	McCollum; R. Montana	4:04
4.	"Hallie Ray Light"	McCollum	3:41
5.	"Hold Me Back"	McCollum; Tony Lane	3:03
6.	"Love You Like That"	McCollum; Billy Montana; Jon Randall	3:35
Total length:			21:28

== Personnel ==
- Parker McCollum – vocals (all tracks)
- Jon Randall – production (all tracks), background vocals (1–4, 6), electric guitar, mandolin (6)
- F. Reid Shippen – percussion (tracks 1, 4, 6), mixing, engineer (all tracks)
- Marc Rogers – bass (tracks 1, 6)
- Jedd Hughes – electric guitar (tracks 1, 3, 6), acoustic guitar, (4, 6), mandolin (4)
- Jimmy Wallace – keyboard (tracks 1, 3–6), Hammond organ (1, 4, 5), piano (1, 2, 5, 6), Rhodes piano (2)
- Rob McNelley – electric guitar (tracks 2–5)
- Lex Price – bass (tracks 2, 5)
- Doug Belote – drums (track 2, 5, 6), percussion (5, 6)
- Stanton Adcock – acoustic guitar (tracks 2, 5)
- Albert Perkins – steel guitar (track 2)
- Jerry Roe – drums, percussion, electric bass guitar (tracks 3, 4)
- Jessi Alexander – background vocals (track 5)
- Pete Lyman – mastering (all tracks)
- Brandon Bell – engineer (all tracks)
- Michael Mechling – assistant mixing (all tracks), assistant engineer (1, 2, 5, 6)
- Ethan Barrette – assistant engineer (tracks 1, 5)
- Daniel Bacigalupi – assistant mastering (tracks 1–3, 5)
- Shani Gandhi – digital editing, engineer (tracks 2–6), background vocals, keyboards (6)
- Evan Wilber – assistant engineer, assistant digital editing (tracks 2, 3)
- Justin Frances – assistant engineer (tracks 3, 4)
- Dan Davis – engineer (tracks 4, 5)

== Charts ==
Weekly chart performance for Hollywood Gold
Chart (2020)	Peak position
US Billboard 200	99
US Top Country Albums (Billboard)	10
