= Probably Wrong =

Studio album by Parker McCollum
- Released: November 10, 2017
- Studio: Cedar Creek Studio (Austin, Texas)
- Genre: Country
- Length: 39:36
- Label: PYM Music
- Producer: Lloyd Maines; Parker McCollum

Parker McCollum chronology
The Limestone Kid (2015)	Probably Wrong (2017)	Hollywood Gold (2020)

Singles from Probably Wrong
- 1. "I Can't Breathe" Released: May 31, 2017; 2. "Hell of a Year" Released: December 1, 2017

Probably Wrong is the second studio album by American country music artist Parker McCollum. It was released on November 10, 2017, by PYM Music. It was co-produced by Lloyd Maines and McCollum. The album was originally released as two EPs, Probably Wrong: Session One and Probably Wrong: Session Two on July 7, 2017, and September 8, 2017, respectively. The album was released with the eight combined tracks from both EPs alongside two new tracks, bringing the total to ten.

The singles "I Can't Breathe" and "Hell of a Year" became certified gold by the Recording Industry Association of America (RIAA) in 2023.

== History ==
The writing and recording of Probably Wrong took place during a transformative time in McCollum's early career. In an interview with Digital Journal, McCollum stated that he had written the whole album over a six-week span.

The album was produced by Grammy Award-winner Lloyd Maines.

As a result of the album's success, McCollum signed with Warner Chappell Music.

== Critical reception ==
Probably Wrong received generally positive reviews from critics, with praise for McCollum's songwriting growth and the album's blend of traditional and contemporary influences.

== Track listing ==
No.	Title	Writer(s)	Length
1.	"Memphis Rain"	Parker McCollum	4:12
2.	"South of the City Lights"	P. McCollum	4:13
3.	"Lonesome Ten Miles"	Doug Jones; P. McCollum; Tyler McCollum	3:29
4.	"I Can't Breathe"	Micky Braun; P. McCollum	4:17
5.	"The Truth"	P. McCollum	3:58
6.	"Misunderstood"	P. McCollum	3:21
7.	"Things Are Looking Up"	P. McCollum	5:14
8.	"Blue Eyed Sally"	Austen Biggers	3:26
9.	"Learn to Fly"	T. McCollum	3:30
10.	"Hell of a Year"	P. McCollum	3:52
Total length:			39:36

=== EPs ===
Probably Wrong: Session One
No.	Title	Writer(s)	Length
1.	"Memphis Rain"	Parker McCollum	4:10
2.	"Lonesome Ten Miles"	Doug Jones; P. McCollum; Tyler McCollum	3:27
3.	"South of the City Lights"	P. McCollum	4:11
4.	"I Can't Breathe"	Micky Braun; P. McCollum	4:15
Total length:			16:04

Probably Wrong: Session Two
No.	Title	Writer(s)	Length
1.	"The Truth"	P. McCollum	3:56
2.	"Misunderstood"	P. McCollum	3:19
3.	"Things Are Looking Up"	P. McCollum	5:12
4.	"Blue Eyed Sally"	Austen Biggers	3:24
Total length:			15:52

== Personnel ==
Track numbers are from the album release.

- Parker McCollum – vocals, production, acoustic guitar (all tracks)
- Lloyd Maines – production, acoustic guitar (all tracks), dobro (1, 2, 5, 8), steel guitar (2, 6, 7, 9), baritone guitar (2, 7), mandolin (8)
- Beau Johnson – drums (tracks 1–4, 6–10)
- Charlie Magnone – Hammond organ (tracks 1, 3, 4), piano (2, 4–7, 9, 10), keyboard (8)
- Drew Womack – background vocals (tracks 1–4, 6, 8)
- Dustin Schaefer – electric guitar (all tracks)
- Jason Newberry – bass (all tracks)
- Corby Shaub – mandolin (track 8)
- John Silva – engineer (all tracks)
- Pat Manske – mastering (all tracks)

== Charts ==
Weekly chart performance for Probably Wrong: Session One
Chart (2017)	Peak position
US Heatseekers Albums (Billboard)	6
US Americana/Folk Albums (Billboard)	23
US Independent Albums (Billboard)	14

Weekly chart performance for Probably Wrong: Session Two
Chart (2017)	Peak position
US Heatseekers Albums (Billboard)	16
US Independent Albums (Billboard)	50
