= Handle on You =

Single by Parker McCollum

from the album Never Enough
- Released: August 15, 2022
- Recorded: 2022
- Studio: Blackbird Studios, Nashville
- Genre: Country
- Length: 3:40
- Label: MCA Nashville
- Songwriters: Parker McCollum; Monty Criswell
- Producer: Jon Randall

Parker McCollum singles chronology
| "To Be Loved by You" (2021) | "Handle on You" (2022) | "Burn It Down" (2023) |

Music video
- "Handle on You" on YouTube

"Handle on You" is a song co-written and recorded by American country music singer Parker McCollum. It was released on August 15, 2022 as the lead single from his fourth studio album Never Enough. McCollum wrote the song with Monty Criswell and it was produced by Jon Randall.

The song was later re-recorded for McCollum's 2026 album, Live from Sound City.

== Composition ==
"Handle on You" is about a breakup between the narrator and an unidentified former romantic partner. The track features a reference to the Merle Haggard hit "I Think I'll Just Stay Here and Drink" in the chorus.

McCollum said he wanted to write something different from his usual songs, and that he chose to focus on the verses after his brother told him that "the best songwriters save their best lines for the verses and not the hooks". Criswell explained that the idea for the song came from alcohol advertisements that he would see on billboards while traveling to visit his daughter at the University of Kentucky. Taste of Country's Billy Dukes called the song a "boozy mid-tempo track" and noted the use of steel guitar.

== Production ==
McCollum revealed that his label initially wanted to release another track, "Hurricane", as the lead single but that he convinced them that "Handle on You" was special.

McCollum worked on the demo with Julian King and later recorded the final version with Randall, who worked to differentiate the sound from that of George Strait, noting "that demo's really country, which there's nothing wrong with, other than going that throwback — you know, like super throwback—was just not going to work." Randall then contemporized the track with McCollum and the musicians.

== Reception ==
Out of McCollum's released singles to that point, "Handle on You" is his fastest growing one, surpassing 120 million global streams.

Tom Roland of Billboard compared the composition of the track to those of George Strait, noting "it's built around a lyrical twist that's obvious without beating the listener over the head. It features a catchy chorus that lifts a little higher than the verses, but maintains a range compact enough that just about anybody can sing it. And it reveals the sensitive heart of its protagonist without compromising his masculinity." McCollum dismissed these comparisons, noting that while he was inspired by Strait, "there's only one king" and joking "maybe one day, there'll be a prince of country music".

== Personnel ==
- Dan Dugmore – steel guitar
- Parker McCollum – vocals
- Rob McNelley – electric guitar
- Jon Randall – production
- Bryan Sutton – acoustic guitar
- Jimmy Wallace – piano

== Charts ==
=== Weekly charts ===
Weekly chart performance for "Handle on You"
| Chart (2022–2023) | Peak position |
|---|---|
| Canada Hot 100 (Billboard) | 81 |
| Canada Country (Billboard) | 4 |
| US Billboard Hot 100 | 30 |
| US Country Airplay (Billboard) | 2 |
| US Hot Country Songs (Billboard) | 10 |

=== Year-end charts ===
2022 year-end chart performance for "Handle on You"
| Chart (2022) | Position |
|---|---|
| US Hot Country Songs (Billboard) | 98 |

2023 year-end chart performance for "Handle on You"
| Chart (2023) | Position |
|---|---|
| US Billboard Hot 100 | 85 |
| US Country Airplay (Billboard) | 10 |
| US Hot Country Songs (Billboard) | 24 |

== Certifications ==
Certifications for "Handle on You"
| Region | Certification | Certified units/sales |
|---|---|---|
| United States (RIAA) | Platinum | 1,000,000^{‡} |
^{‡} Sales+streaming figures based on certification alone.
