= Wildeyes =

WILDEYES
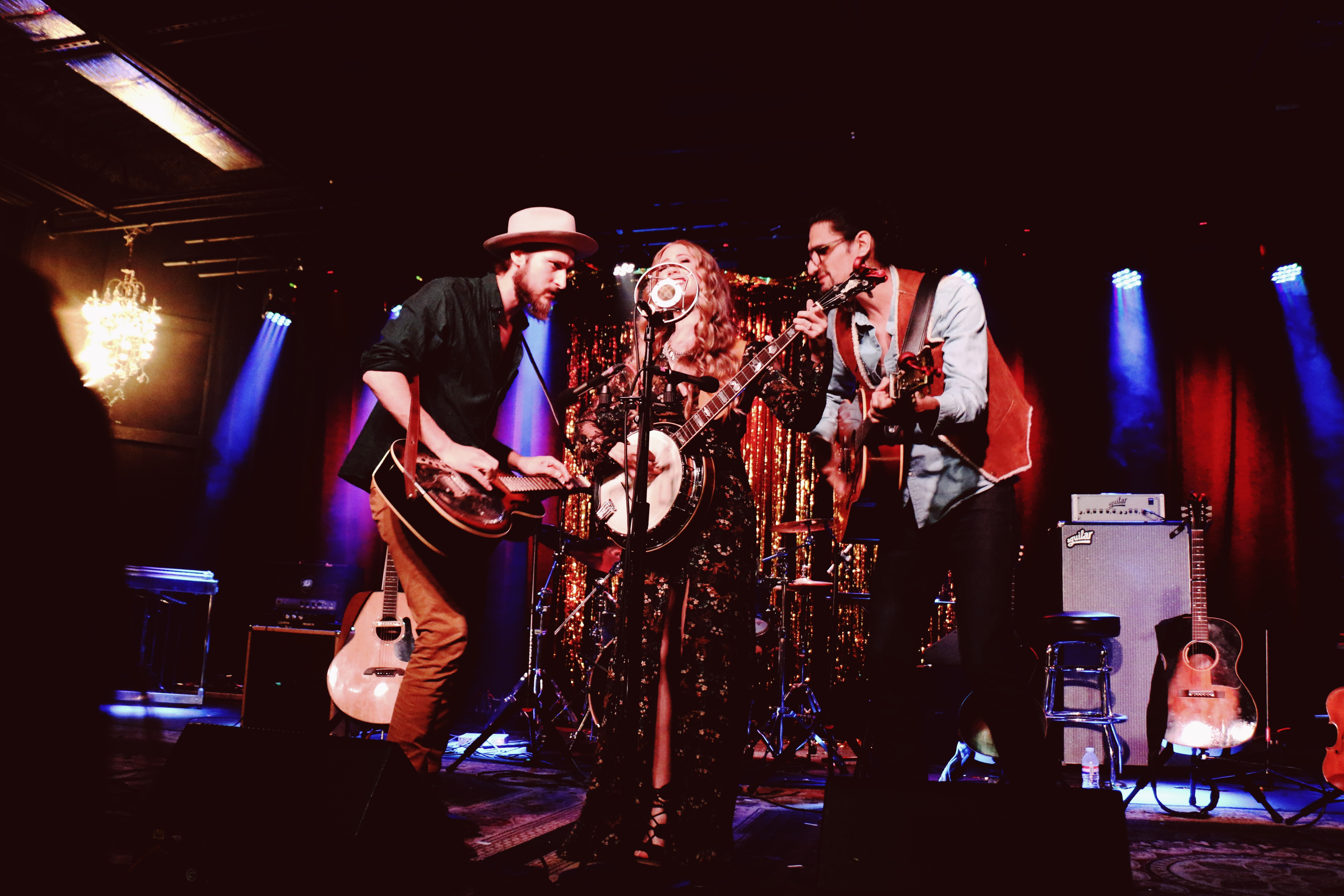

Background information
- Origin: Nashville, Tennessee, USA
- Genres: Americana; Folk
- Years active: 2016–present
- Label: Scriptkiddie Records
- Members: Emily Kohavi; Daniel Kohavi; Max Hoffman
- Website: Official website

Wildeyes (stylized as WILDEYES) is an American folk band based in Nashville, Tennessee, and consisting of Emily Kohavi, Daniel Kohavi, and Max Hoffman.

The Kohavis and Hoffman were neighbors who started playing music together for fun. They started working together professionally as Scriptkiddie, and later changed to Wildeyes.

The band has played at Firefly Music Festival and performed as a part of NPR Music's Tiny Desk On The Road. Their music is influenced by genres such as folk, country, and rock.

== Discography ==
Title	Album details
Tennessee Is Alive	Release Date: July 17, 2018; Label: Scriptkiddie Records
Empty Love	Release Date: June 20, 2018; Label: Scriptkiddie Records
Magic	Release Date: May 23, 2018; Label: Scriptkiddie Records
Wicked Game - Live from the Sanctuary	Release Date: July 6, 2018; Label: Scriptkiddie Records
