= The Limestone Kid =

Studio album by Parker McCollum
- Released: February 24, 2015
- Studio: Cedar Creek Studio (Austin, Texas)
- Genre: Country
- Length: 42:02
- Label: PYM Music
- Producer: Corby Schaub

Parker McCollum chronology
| A Red Town View (2013) | The Limestone Kid (2015) | Probably Wrong (2017) |

Singles from The Limestone Kid
- 1. "Meet You in the Middle" Released: January 27, 2015; 2. "High Above the Water" Released: 2015

The Limestone Kid is the debut studio album by American country music artist Parker McCollum. The album was released on February 24, 2015, via PYM Music. It was produced by Corby Schaub.

== Background ==
Raised in Conroe, Texas, McCollum was influenced by his older brother and by Texas-based artists such as Chris Knight, Adam Carroll, James McMurtry, and Robert Earl Keen. After graduating high school, McCollum moved to Austin and formed a band. He released his debut EP A Red Town View in 2013, which featured "The Tune" and "Who's Laughing Now," which both appeared on his debut album. "Permanent Headphones" was later rereleased on his fifth studio album, Parker McCollum.

Two singles were released from the album, "Meet You in the Middle" and "High Above the Water." Both songs charted on the Texas Music Chart, gaining him state-wide success in Texas.

The album's name, The Limestone Kid, was influenced by McCollum's grandfather's ranch in Limestone County, Texas. McCollum wrote the album in his apartment in Austin, Texas.

In February 2025, McCollum released an exclusive bright green vinyl for the tenth anniversary of the album.

== Themes ==
The album included strong influences of country, folk, rock, and Americana.

== Critical reception ==
Professional ratings
Review scores
| Source | Rating |
|---|---|
| The Austin Chronicle | 3.5/5 stars |
| PopMatters | 8/10 |

The Limestone Kid and McCollum received praise from critics, with the Lone Star Music Magazine stating that "If you take a bit of Townes Van Zandt's oblique mysticism, the confessional poetry of Ryan Bingham, and Gillian Welch's stripped down, tenderly honest vignettes of the lost and lonely, you have an approximation of McCollum's approach."

The Austin Chronicle gave the album 3.5 stars out of five, writing that "it's too early to declare The Limestone Kid debut of the year, but it's already one to beat", and comparing him to Charlie Robison.

== Track listing ==
| No. | Title | Writer(s) | Length |
|---|---|---|---|
| 1. | "Happy New Year" | Parker McCollum | 3:59 |
| 2. | "Lucy" | P. McCollum | 3:01 |
| 3. | "Meet You in the Middle" | P. McCollum | 3:30 |
| 4. | "All Day" | P. McCollum | 3:46 |
| 5. | "Prohibition Rose" | Tyler McCollum | 3:45 |
| 6. | "The Tune" | P. McCollum; T. McCollum | 4:03 |
| 7. | "Galveston Bay" | Austen Biggers | 4:06 |
| 8. | "Who's Laughing Now" | P. McCollum | 3:20 |
| 9. | "High Above the Water" | P. McCollum | 4:11 |
| 10. | "New Orleans" | P. McCollum; T. McCollum | 3:51 |
| 11. | "Silhouette" | P. McCollum | 4:25 |
| Total length: | | | 42:02 |

== Personnel ==
- Parker McCollum – vocals, acoustic guitar (all tracks), harmonica (11)
- Corby Schaub – production, engineer (all tracks), electric guitar (2, 4, 6, 8, 11), background vocals (2, 6, 10), percussion, slide guitar (2), lap steel guitar (3, 6), mandolin (6, 8, 10), piano, dobro (11)
- Beau Johnson – drums (tracks 1, 4, 6, 8)
- Chris Gage – piano (track 1)
- Cord Jackson – acoustic guitar (tracks 1, 7), background vocals (6)
- Jason Newberry – bass (tracks 1–5, 7, 9–11)
- Kurt Grein – electric guitar (tracks 1–5, 7, 9–11), background vocals (4)
- Scottie Iman – drums (tracks 2, 3, 5, 7, 9–11)
- Ron Flynt – Hammond organ, assistant engineer (tracks 4, 9)
- Lloyd Maines – pedal steel guitar (track 5)
- Tina Wilkins – background vocals (tracks 5, 9)
- Brandon Anthony – fiddle (track 7)
- Ashley Monical – background vocals (track 8)
- Harmoni Kelley – bass (track 8)
- Pat Manske – mixing (all tracks)
- Jerry Tubb – mastering (all tracks)
- John Ross Silva – engineer (all tracks), percussion (6)
