= RedGorilla =

Annual independent music festival in Austin, Texas, United States

RedGorilla Music Fest was an annual independent music festival in Austin, Texas. The last festival was in 2018.

Many artists performed at RedGorilla early in their careers, including Macklemore & Ryan Lewis, Kendrick Lamar, Imagine Dragons, The National, Foster the People, Cage the Elephant, and Ryan Bingham.

RedGorilla launched nearly 15 years ago as the DreamScapers Artist Showcase. In 2007, the founders re-branded the event as RedGorilla. RedGorilla grew from 200 performers to about 500 performers.
