= To Be Loved by You (Parker McCollum song) =

2021 single by Parker McCollum

Single by Parker McCollum

from the album Gold Chain Cowboy
- Released: January 25, 2021
- Genre: Neotraditional country
- Length: 3:18
- Label: MCA Nashville
- Songwriters: Parker McCollum; Rhett Akins
- Producer: Jon Randall

Parker McCollum singles chronology
"Pretty Heart" (2020)	"To Be Loved by You" (2021)	"Handle on You" (2022)

Music video
- "To Be Loved by You" on YouTube

"To Be Loved by You" is a song by American country music singer Parker McCollum. It was released on January 1, 2021, as the second single from his third studio album Gold Chain Cowboy, and released to country radio on January 25, 2021. McCollum wrote the song with Rhett Akins, and it was produced by Jon Randall.

The song was later re-recorded for McCollum's 2026 album, Live from Sound City.

== Background ==
The Boot explained that the track came from McCollum made about his fiancée Hallie Ray Light that was written in a "stream-of-consciousness songwriting session" on his tour bus, before he finished it with Rhett Akins.

== Content ==
Billy Dukes of Taste of Country described "To Be Loved by You" as a story about the "Texan mourning a girl that he foolishly let slip away". McCollum told Digital Journal that the track "is not really about a breakup, it's about figuring it out and navigating that part of your life."

== Music video ==
The music video was uploaded on January 14, 2021, and was directed by Peter Zavadil. According to a description on U Music, it showcases McCollum's "energetical performance as he moves on from a relationship".

== Credits and personnel ==
Credits adapted from Tidal.

- Parker McCollum – composer, lyricist, associated performer, lead vocals
- Jon Randall – producer, associated performer, background vocals
- Rhett Akins – composer, lyricist
- Daniel Bacigalupi – assistant mastering engineer, studio personnel
- Michael Mechling – assistant mixer, assistant recording engineer, studio personnel
- Doug Belote – associated performer, drums
- Jimmy Wallance – associated performer, keyboards
- John Cowan – associated performer, background vocals
- Lex Price – associated performer, bass guitar
- Rob McNelley – associated performer, electric guitar
- Stanton Adcock – associated performer, electric guitar
- Ethan Barrette – assistant recording engineer, studio personnel
- Shani Gandhi – editor, engineer, recording engineer, studio personnel, vocal editing
- F. Reid Shippen – engineer, mix engineer, studio personnel
- Pete Lyman – mastering engineer, studio personnel
- Dan Davis – recording engineer, studio personnel

== Charts ==
=== Weekly charts ===
Weekly chart performance for "To Be Loved by You"
Chart (2021–2022)	Peak position
Canada Country (Billboard)	33
US Billboard Hot 100	41
US Country Airplay (Billboard)	1
US Hot Country Songs (Billboard)	6

=== Year-end charts ===
2021 year-end chart performance for "To Be Loved by You"
Chart (2021)	Position
US Hot Country Songs (Billboard)	78

2022 year-end chart performance for "To Be Loved by You"
Chart (2022)	Position
US Country Airplay (Billboard)	35
US Hot Country Songs (Billboard)	42

== Certifications ==
Region	Certification	Certified units/sales
United States (RIAA)	3× Platinum	3,000,000^{‡}
^{‡} Sales+streaming figures based on certification alone.

== Release history ==
Release history for "To Be Loved by You"
Region	Date	Format	Label	Ref.
Various	January 1, 2021	Digital download; streaming	MCA Nashville	
United States	January 25, 2021	Country radio	MCA Nashville	
