= Parker McCollum =

American musician (born 1992)

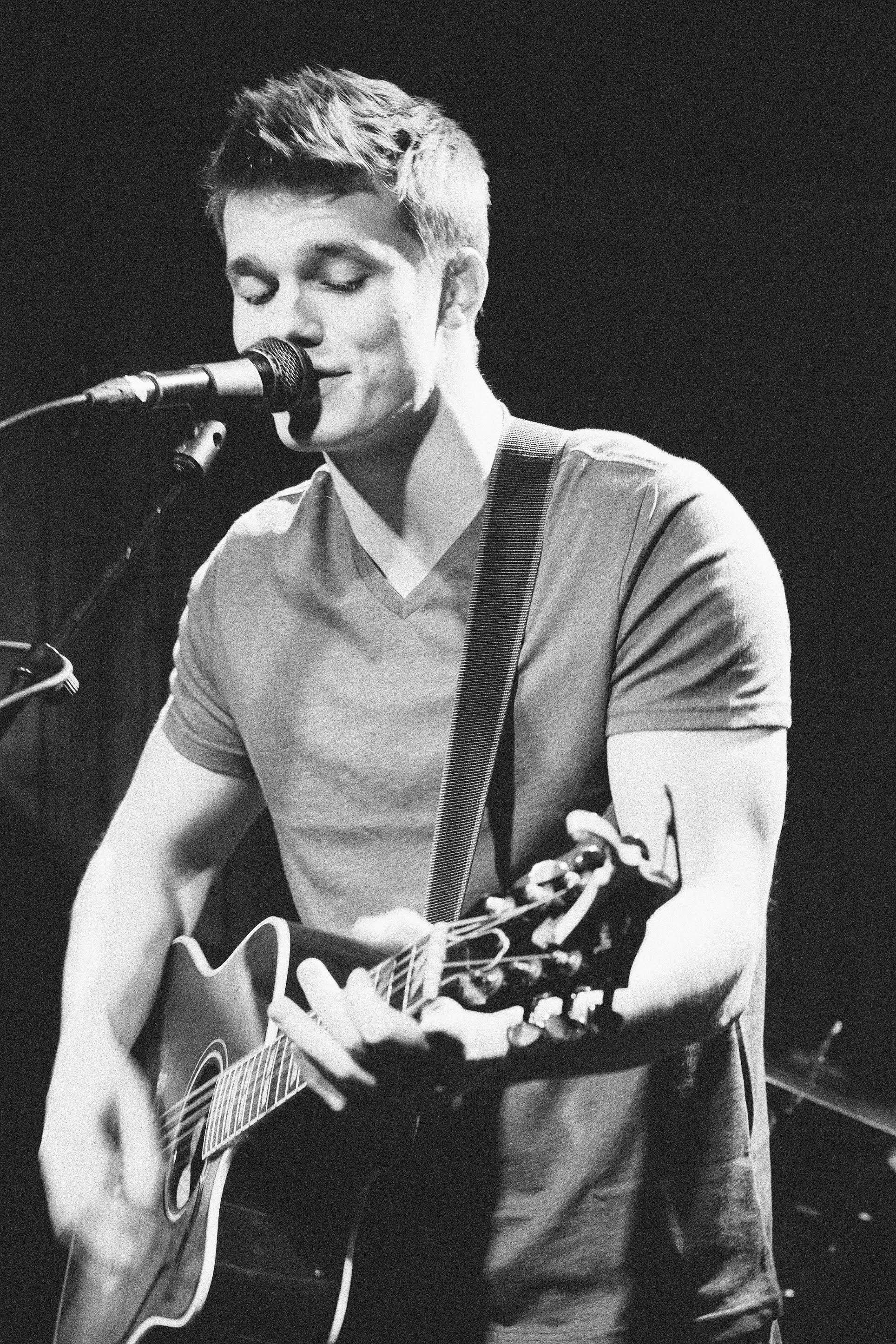
- McCollum in 2014

Background information
- Born: Parker Yancey McCollum; June 15, 1992 (age 34); Conroe, Texas, U.S.
- Origin: Austin, Texas, U.S.
- Genres: Americana; Texas country; neotraditional country; blues
- Occupations: Singer-songwriter; musician
- Instruments: Guitar; harmonica; vocals; pucker whistler
- Years active: 2013–present
- Labels: PYM Music; MCA Nashville
- Website: parkermccollum.com

Parker Yancey McCollum (born June 15, 1992) is an American country singer-songwriter based in Texas. The owner of PYM Music, he released his first single and EP in 2013; his debut album, The Limestone Kid, was released on February 24, 2015. The Austin Chronicle gave the release 3.5/5 stars, writing that "it's too early to declare The Limestone Kid debut of the year, but it's already one to beat", and comparing McCollum's music to Charlie Robison's. McCollum and his backing band announced a 2015 tour of Texas in support of the album, performing at events such as RedGorilla Music Fest. McCollum released the EP Probably Wrong: Session One on July 7, 2017, and followed it with Probably Wrong: Session Two on September 8, 2017. The full Probably Wrong album was released on November 10, 2017. His major-label debut album, Gold Chain Cowboy, was released July 30, 2021.

== Early life ==
Parker McCollum was born in 1992 and raised in Conroe, Texas, near Houston. Early in his life he listened to classic country musicians such as Willie Nelson, Buck Owens, and Porter Wagoner, and his family introduced him to red dirt musicians such as Cross Canadian Ragweed, Pat Green, and Chris Knight. McCollum spent much of his early life working on cattle ranches in Houston and Limestone Counties for his grandfather Bobby Yancey. While working on these ranches, McCollum was further exposed to artists such as Bob Dylan, Townes Van Zandt, and Steve Earle. McCollum has referred to neotraditional country pioneer and fellow Texan George Strait as his musical hero, and has covered several Strait songs in his performances.

In elementary school McCollum learned violin and played in the school orchestra, and he started learning guitar at age thirteen. At thirteen he also began writing his own music, mixing genres such as Texas country music, Americana, and indie rock. According to McCollum, he was greatly influenced by his older brother Tyler's lyrics and songwriting. After performing at a number of local open mics with his guitar, he started learning harmonica at age fifteen. By sixteen he was securing gigs at local venues and continued to work on his material through high school, The Woodlands College Park High School. After graduation he moved to Austin, Texas, where he began attending college.

== Music career ==
=== Singles and A Red Town View (2013–2014) ===
McCollum continued to perform as a singer-songwriter while living in Austin and he went on his first tour with the Texas band Six Market Blvd. The tour inspired the lyrics for his first single, "Highway", which was released on June 5, 2013, and later included on his debut EP A Red Town View. Released on November 19, 2013, the EP was produced by Corby Schaub, who is also known as the former guitarist for Ryan Bingham.

=== The Limestone Kid (2015) ===
McCollum's debut album The Limestone Kid was recorded at Cedar Creek Recording in Austin, and includes styles such as Americana, Texas country, and folk-rock. McCollum handles vocals, acoustic guitar, and harmonica, and his Austin-based backing band included Kurt Grien on lead guitar, Jason Newberry on bass, Will Hoback on drums, and Charlie Magnone on keyboards and piano. Multi-instrumentalist Corby Schaub produced the album. Lloyd Maines contributed pedal steel guitar.

External videos
- Parker McCollum — Meet You In The Middle Live at The Saxon Pub (Feb 2015)

McCollum wrote or co-wrote nine of the eleven tracks, and two of the songs were written by McCollum's family members. Many of the lyrics are about his experiences growing up in Limestone County, Texas, and the album's title is a reference to the nickname he earned working summers at a Limestone County ranch. The first single on the album, McCollum's original track "Meet You in the Middle", was released to Texas radio prior to the album.

The debut album The Limestone Kid was released on February 24, 2015. The Austin Chronicle gave it 3.5/5 stars, writing that "it's too early to declare The Limestone Kid debut of the year, but it's already one to beat", and comparing him to Charlie Robison. Texas Music Pickers wrote that "[McCollum's] stories are not all happy, or sad, or even have resolution; they're just straightforward accounts of life. It's like Todd Snider meets Whiskeytown." "High Above The Water" reached the top 50 of the Texas Regional Radio Report.

McCollum and his backing band announced a tour of Texas in support of the album, with February and March dates set for venues in Houston, Austin, and Fort Worth. The band performed at the RedGorilla Music Fest, and Texas Crawfish and Music Festival in Spring, Texas. He won the T-Birds Songwriter Award, and in 2015 performed at Larry Joe Taylor's Texas Music Festival.

=== Probably Wrong (2017) ===
McCollum released an EP titled Probably Wrong: Session One on July 7, 2017. It was his first release to appear on the Billboard charts, debuting at No. 6 on Heatseekers Albums, No. 14 on Independent Albums, and No. 15 on Country Album Sales, with 2,000 copies sold in the US in its first week. Probably Wrong Session Two was released shortly thereafter on September 8, 2017. The full 10-track Probably Wrong album was released on November 10, 2017, and includes all the previous sessions which features the singles "I Can't Breathe" and "Misunderstood", plus two new tracks, including "Hell of a Year". The full Probably Wrong album was produced by Grammy Award-winning Lloyd Maines. McCollum toured through the end of 2017 to promote his newest releases.

=== MCA Nashville ===
McCollum signed with MCA Nashville on June 27, 2019. His first single under the label was "Pretty Heart". On October 16, 2020, McCollum released the EP Hollywood Gold.

=== Gold Chain Cowboy (2021) ===
On July 30, 2021, McCollum released his third studio album, produced by Jon Randall, to mostly positive reviews. Country Swag states that this album is "sonically more polished than his first two albums", and that what "Parker McCollum does best on Gold Chain Cowboy is refrain from sounding like everyone else on country radio." In March 2022, he went on to win the New Male Artist of the Year at the American Country Music Awards.

In March 2022, McCollum performed for the first time at the Houston Livestock Show and Rodeo to an attendance of 73,243.

=== Never Enough and self-titled album (2023–present) ===
On August 5, 2022, McCollum released "Handle on You" as the lead single from his second major label studio album (fourth overall), Never Enough. He subsequently released the tracks "Stoned", "I Ain't Going Nowhere", and "Speed" as promotional singles.

On September 13, 2024, McCollum released the song "What Kinda Man". On March 24, 2025, McCollum announced his fifth album, a self-titled record. It was released on June 27, 2025.

== Musical style and influences ==
Parker McCollum's music incorporates genres as diverse as blues, roots rock, soul, and folk rock, though his albums have primarily been described as country and Americana. His music has received rotation on Americana radio stations in particular, and he has referenced Americana singer-songwriter Ryan Bingham as a significant influence. Other stylistic influences include alternative country musician Ryan Adams, blues and folk artist Townes Van Zandt, pop-rock artist John Mayer, and country musician George Strait.

== Controversies ==
In December 2024, McCollum was involved in a feud with fellow country singer Oliver Anthony. Anthony had posted a 15-minute vlog entitled "What I've Learned From The Music Industry So Far", which contained an anecdote about a show Anthony had observed where an unnamed artist was using "six autotune modulators on a pedal board onstage to help with vocal pitch." This anecdote led commentators and fans to speculate that the unnamed artist was McCollum. McCollum responded by calling the anecdote a "fabricated lie". McCollum's reaction received comments of support from several fellow country artists, including Koe Wetzel and Corey Kent.

== Discography ==
Studio albums

- The Limestone Kid (2015)
- Probably Wrong (2017)
- Gold Chain Cowboy (2021)
- Never Enough (2023)
- Parker McCollum (2025)
- Live from Sound City (2026)

== Awards and nominations ==
=== CMT Music Awards ===
| Year | Nominee / work | Award | Result |
|---|---|---|---|
| 2022 | "To Be Loved by You" | Breakthrough Video of the Year | Won |

=== Academy of Country Music Awards ===
| Year | Nominee / work | Award | Result |
|---|---|---|---|
| 2021 | Parker McCollum | New Male Artist of the Year | Nominated |
| 2022 | Parker McCollum | New Male Artist of the Year | Won |
| 2024 | "Burn It Down" | Single of the Year | Nominated |
| 2024 | "Burn It Down" | Visual Media of the Year | Won |
| 2026 | Parker McCollum | Album of the Year | Won |

=== Country Music Association Awards ===
| Year | Nominee / work | Award | Result |
|---|---|---|---|
| 2022 | Parker McCollum | New Artist of the Year | Nominated |
| 2023 | Parker McCollum | New Artist of the Year | Nominated |
| 2024 | "Burn It Down" | Song of the Year | Nominated |
