= Never Enough (Parker McCollum album) =

Studio album by Parker McCollum
- Released: May 12, 2023
- Genre: Country
- Length: 56:49
- Label: MCA Nashville
- Producer: Jon Randall

Parker McCollum chronology
| Gold Chain Cowboy (2021) | Never Enough (2023) | Parker McCollum (2025) |

Singles from Never Enough
- 1. "Handle on You" Released: August 15, 2022; 2. "Burn It Down" Released: June 19, 2023

Never Enough is the fourth studio album by American country music singer Parker McCollum. It was released via MCA Nashville on May 12, 2023. It was produced by Jon Randall and was preceded by the single "Handle on You".

== Content ==
McCollum co-wrote all but one of the 15 tracks on Never Enough and enlisted Jon Randall, who produced Gold Chain Cowboy, to produce the record. He wrote with frequent collaborators Randall, Wade Bowen, and Randy Rogers, as well as several notable songwriters including Ashley Gorley, Hillary Lindsey, Brett James, Lori McKenna, Lee Miller, Monty Criswell, and Liz Rose.

"Handle on You" was released on August 15, 2022 as the album's lead single. It reached a peak of number two on the Billboard Country Airplay chart in May 2023. "Burn It Down", a song McCollum co-wrote with songwriting collective The Love Junkies (Lindsey, McKenna, and Rose), was released as the album's second single on June 19, 2023.

== Track listing ==
Never Enough track listing
| No. | Title | Writer(s) | Length |
|---|---|---|---|
| 1. | "Hurricane" | Parker McCollum; David Lee Murphy; Jon Randall; Randy Rogers | 3:48 |
| 2. | "Best I Never Had" | Will Bundy; Brett James; McCollum | 3:24 |
| 3. | "Things I Never Told You" | Monty Criswell; Lynn Hutton; Taylor Phillips | 3:41 |
| 4. | "Burn It Down" | Hillary Lindsey; McCollum; Lori McKenna; Liz Rose | 3:53 |
| 5. | "Stoned" | Mark Holman; James; McCollum | 3:08 |
| 6. | "Handle on You" | Criswell; McCollum | 3:39 |
| 7. | "Lessons from an Old Man" | McCollum; McKenna; Lee Miller; Randall; Rose | 4:03 |
| 8. | "Tough People Do" | James; McCollum; Randall | 4:19 |
| 9. | "Speed" | Ryan Beaver; McCollum | 4:30 |
| 10. | "Tails I Lose" | Wade Bowen; McCollum; Brad Warren; Brett Warren | 3:45 |
| 11. | "I Ain't Going Nowhere" | McCollum; McKenna; Miller; Randall; Rose | 3:24 |
| 12. | "Too Tight This Time" | James; McCollum; Randall | 4:05 |
| 13. | "Don't Blame Me" | James; McCollum; Randall | 3:50 |
| 14. | "Have Your Heart Again" | Ashley Gorley; McCollum; Miller | 3:29 |
| 15. | "Wheel" | McCollum; Randall; Brad Warren; Brett Warren | 3:44 |

== Personnel ==
Musicians

- Parker McCollum – lead vocals
- Jimmy Wallace – keyboards (tracks 1, 2, 5, 6, 10, 15), piano (3, 7, 8, 11, 12, 14), synthesizer (4, 8, 9, 11–13), Hammond B3 (6–9, 11, 13)
- Craig Young – bass (tracks 1–13, 15)
- Chad Cromwell – drums (tracks 1–13, 15), percussion (1, 2, 5–9, 15)
- Rob McNelley – electric guitar (tracks 1–13, 15), acoustic guitar (10, 15)
- Bryan Sutton – acoustic guitar (tracks 1, 2, 5–7, 9–13, 15), mandolin (1, 2, 6, 11)
- Jon Randall – background vocals (tracks 1–4, 6, 7, 9–11, 13, 15), acoustic guitar (3), electric guitar (4), percussion (8, 11, 13)
- Dan Dugmore – pedal steel (tracks 3, 6, 10), electric guitar (5), lap steel guitar (9)
- Jedd Hughes – acoustic guitar (tracks 4, 8)
- F. Reid Shippen – percussion (tracks 4, 11), programming (7, 13)
- Hillary Lindsey – background vocals (track 4)
- Jessi Alexander – background vocals (tracks 5, 11, 13)
- Kendra Chantelle – background vocals (track 5)
- Perry Coleman – background vocals (track 8)
- Shani Gandhi – background vocals (tracks 12, 13)
- Jerry Douglas – Dobro (track 12)

Technical

- Jon Randall – production
- Pete Lyman – mastering
- F. Reid Shippen – mixing (all tracks), engineering (tracks 1–5, 7–15)
- Casey Wood – engineering (tracks 1, 2, 10, 15), editing (1, 2, 6, 9, 10, 15)
- Shani Gandhi – engineering, editing (tracks 3, 4, 7, 8, 11–14)
- Brandon Bell – engineering (track 6), editing (5, 6, 9)
- Kyle Manner – editing (track 5)
- Sean Sullivan – additional engineering (track 12)
- Daniel Bacigalupi – mastering assistance
- Brandon Towles – mixing assistance (all tracks), engineering assistance (tracks 1, 2, 4–7, 9, 10, 12)
- Ethan Barrette – engineering assistance (tracks 1, 2, 4–7, 9, 10, 12)
- Austin Brown – engineering assistance (tracks 3, 8, 11, 13)

Visuals

- Karen Naff – art direction
- Kera Jackson – art production
- Craig Allen – design
- Jim Wright – photography

== Charts ==
=== Weekly charts ===
Weekly chart performance for Never Enough
| Chart (2023) | Peak position |
|---|---|
| US Billboard 200 | 56 |
| US Top Country Albums (Billboard) | 12 |

=== Year-end charts ===
Year-end chart performance for Never Enough
| Chart (2023) | Position |
|---|---|
| US Top Country Albums (Billboard) | 54 |
| Chart (2024) | Position |
| US Top Country Albums (Billboard) | 55 |
