= Eric Masse =

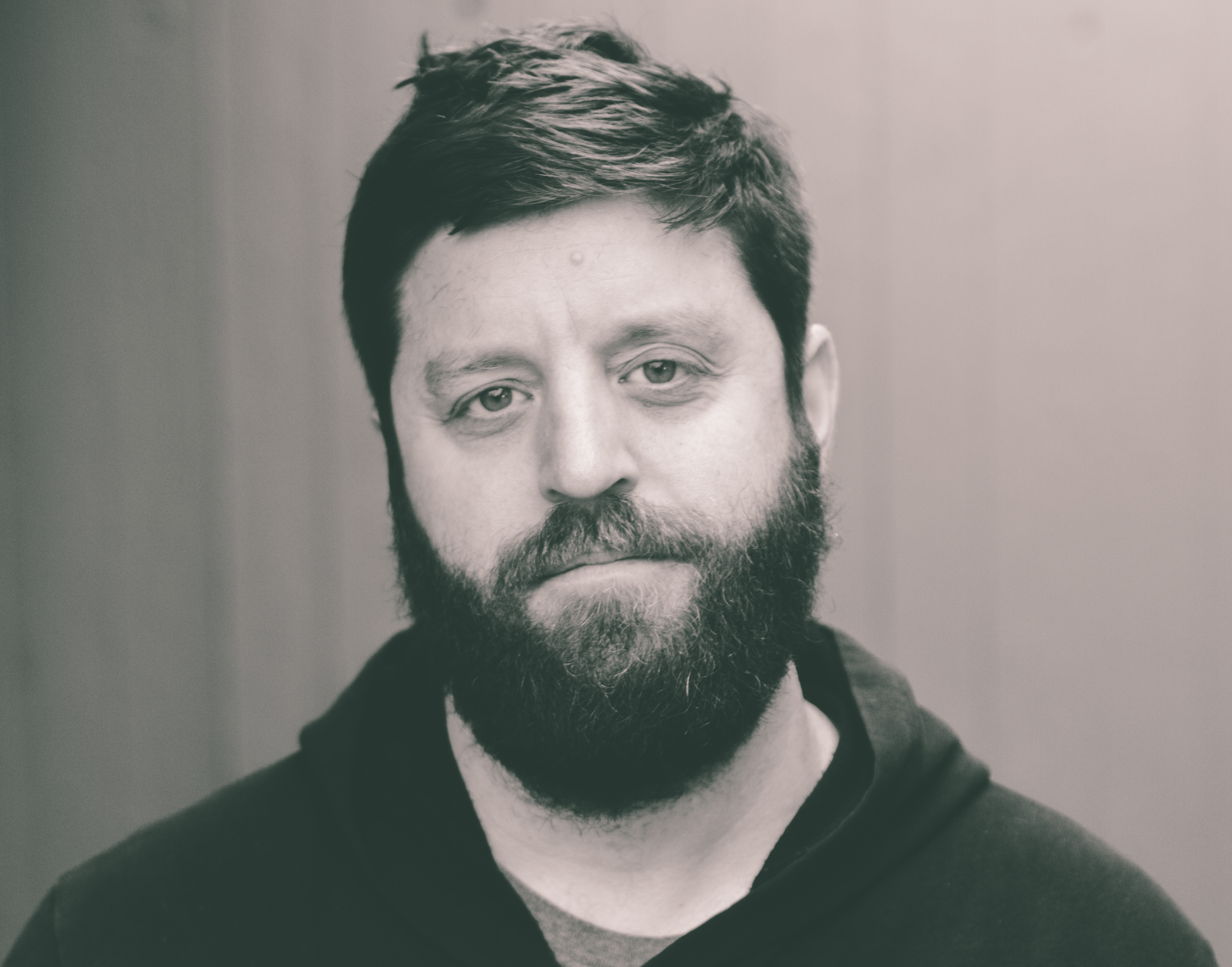
Eric Masse at The Casino in East Nashville, 2017

Eric Masse is an American recording engineer and record producer.

Masse grew up in Grand Rapids, Michigan, before attending Berklee School of Music in Boston and studied Production and Engineering. After graduating in 2004, he moved to Nashville, TN. During his first years in Music City, Masse worked as intern at Blackbird Studio by day and tended bar at night. Masse's first studio in Tennessee was called "Cabin In the Woods" (Fairview, TN), followed by Idiot Dog (Music Row), and finally The Casino (East Nashville), where he works most today. When a record calls for a larger studio, he prefers Southern Ground Nashville.

In 2014, while playing in a golf tournament, Masse met eminent Nashville producer, Frank Liddell. Their fraternal chemistry led to collaboration which has born several projects, most notably Miranda Lambert’s 2016 release, The Weight of These Wings, a double album produced by Masse, Liddell, and Glenn Worf.

Masse won the Academy of Country Music's Album of the Year award for The Weight of These Wings in 2017.

He married graphic designer, Sarah Parker-Masse, in 2014. They live in East Nashville with their two dogs, Kaya and Oscar.
