= Sweet Vitriol =

- Severance episode
- Cobel arrives at Sissy’s house.
- Episode no.: Season 2 Episode 8
- Directed by: Ben Stiller
- Written by: Adam Countee; K. C. Perry
- Cinematography by: Jessica Lee Gagné
- Editing by: Geoffrey Richman
- Original release date: March 6, 2025 (Note: The episode was promoted with the global release date of March 7, but released in American time zones on the preceding evening.)
- Running time: 37 minutes

Guest appearances
- James LeGros as Hampton; Jane Alexander as Celestine "Sissy" Cobel; Jerry Stahl as Magnus; Emma Troake as Dot; Clare Coulter as Rose

Episode chronology
← Previous "Chikhai Bardo"	Next → "The After Hours"

"Sweet Vitriol" is the eighth episode of the second season of the American science fiction psychological thriller television series Severance. It is the 17th overall episode of the series and was written by co-executive producer Adam Countee and consulting producer K. C. Perry, and directed by executive producer Ben Stiller. It was released on Apple TV+ on March 6, 2025.

The series follows employees of Lumon Industries, a biotechnology corporation that uses a medical procedure called "severance" to separate the memories of their employees: at work, Lumon employees, called "innies", can't remember anything outside of work. Outside work, Lumon employees, called "outies", can't remember anything about work. As a result, innies and outies experience two different lives, with distinct personalities and agendas. In the episode, Harmony Cobel visits her derelict hometown, revealing key details about her history with Lumon.

The episode received mixed reviews from critics, who praised Patricia Arquette's performance and its character development, although some were polarized by the episode's placement in the season's narrative arc and the script's character logic. Arquette submitted the episode to support her Emmy nomination for Outstanding Supporting Actress in a Drama Series. Jane Alexander, who played Sissy, also received an Emmy nomination for her performance in the episode, for Outstanding Guest Actress in a Drama Series.

== Plot ==
Harmony Cobel arrives in her hometown, Salt's Neck, which was once home to the now-defunct Lumon ether factory where Kier Eagan met his wife Imogene. As a result of Lumon abandoning the factory, the town is decaying and many local residents are addicted to ether. She approaches an old friend, Hampton, and asks for his help. They meet at the factory, where it is revealed the two knew each other as child laborers at Lumon.

Despite the tension between them, Hampton agrees to drive Cobel to see her aunt, Sissy, who is a pariah to the town and lives in an isolated area. Cobel believes that Lumon is surveilling Sissy and the town and would recognize her car, so she hides in the bed of Hampton's truck. Along the way, Cobel receives a phone call from Devon but does not answer.

Sissy is upset by the arrival of Cobel and Hampton at her home. Sissy, a Lumon devotee who once worked for the company, mentions that she received a call from Mr. Drummond, but refuses to tell Cobel what transpired. Cobel, who grew up in the home, finds her mother Charlotte's old bedroom locked and that her own childhood belongings have been purged from the house. She argues with her aunt about her mother's illness and death, which occurred while Cobel was away at a Lumon-run boarding school, before finding the key to her mother's room. After lying on the bed and placing her mother's breathing tube in her mouth, she falls asleep crying.

Hours later, Hampton wakes Cobel. They each take a hit of ether and share a kiss. Hampton urges Cobel to leave before Lumon catches up to her, but Cobel is determined to find something that she is certain Sissy would not have thrown out. She goes to the outdoor storeroom and finds her old yearbook and a trophy revealing that she had secured a prestigious Lumon fellowship known as Wintertide. (Note: Miss Huang is part of the same fellowship, as seen in "Attila".) Inside the trophy, she finds an old notebook of hers, which proves she invented the severance procedure and technology, despite Lumon's claims that it was created by the current CEO Jame Eagan. Sissy attempts to burn the notebook, but Cobel snatches it away.

Hampton warns Cobel that a car is approaching the house, and she quickly leaves in his truck while Hampton stays behind to confront the approaching vehicle. As Cobel leaves town, she receives another call from Devon and answers it. Devon tells her that Mark is reintegrating. She gives the phone to Mark and Cobel demands to know everything.

== Production ==
=== Development ===
The episode was written by co-executive producer Adam Countee and consulting producer K. C. Perry, and directed by executive producer Ben Stiller. This marked Countee's first writing credit, Perry's first writing credit, and Stiller's tenth directing credit.

The town of Salt's Neck was primarily represented by Bonavista, Newfoundland and Labrador. It was recommended by cinematographer Jessica Lee Gagné. Filming was undertaken in May 2023, so crew had to import ice to make snow for the episode's winter setting.

=== Writing ===
Patricia Arquette explained Lumon taking over Cobel's plans, "The way that this belief system works — like a lot of things, like the military or whatever — it's all for the glory of the organization. It's all for the glory of Kier. It's not about you, not about the individual. It's about the organization, what the organization needs. Here's this person who will never get the acknowledgement from the people that she wants it most from: her aunt and Lumon itself." She also added, "all of the bridges are burned. Cobel has nothing to lose here. She's going to try to use her wiles and come up with some strategy and try to manipulate this situation as best she can, but the dangerous thing is that she's got nothing to lose."

== Critical reception ==
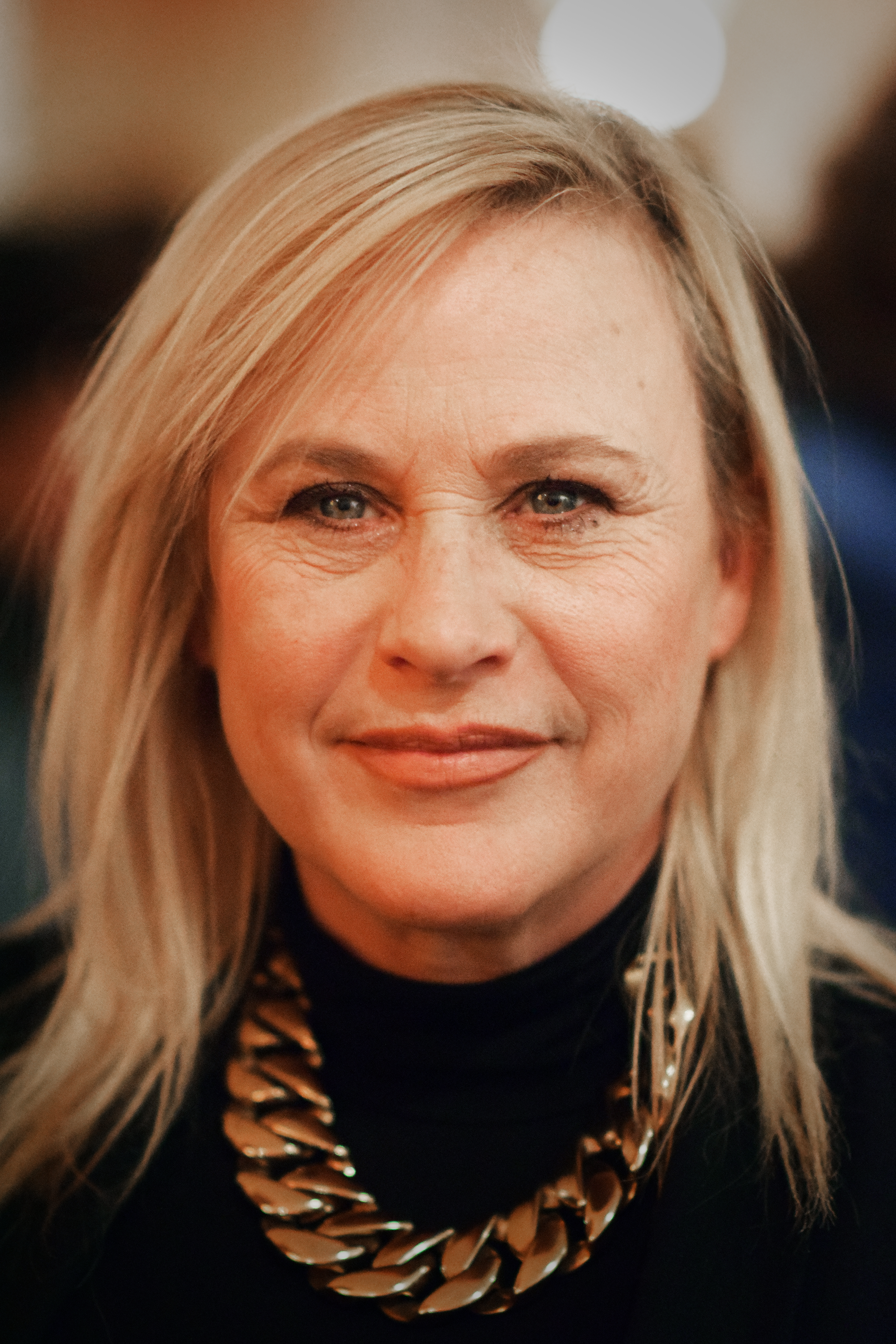
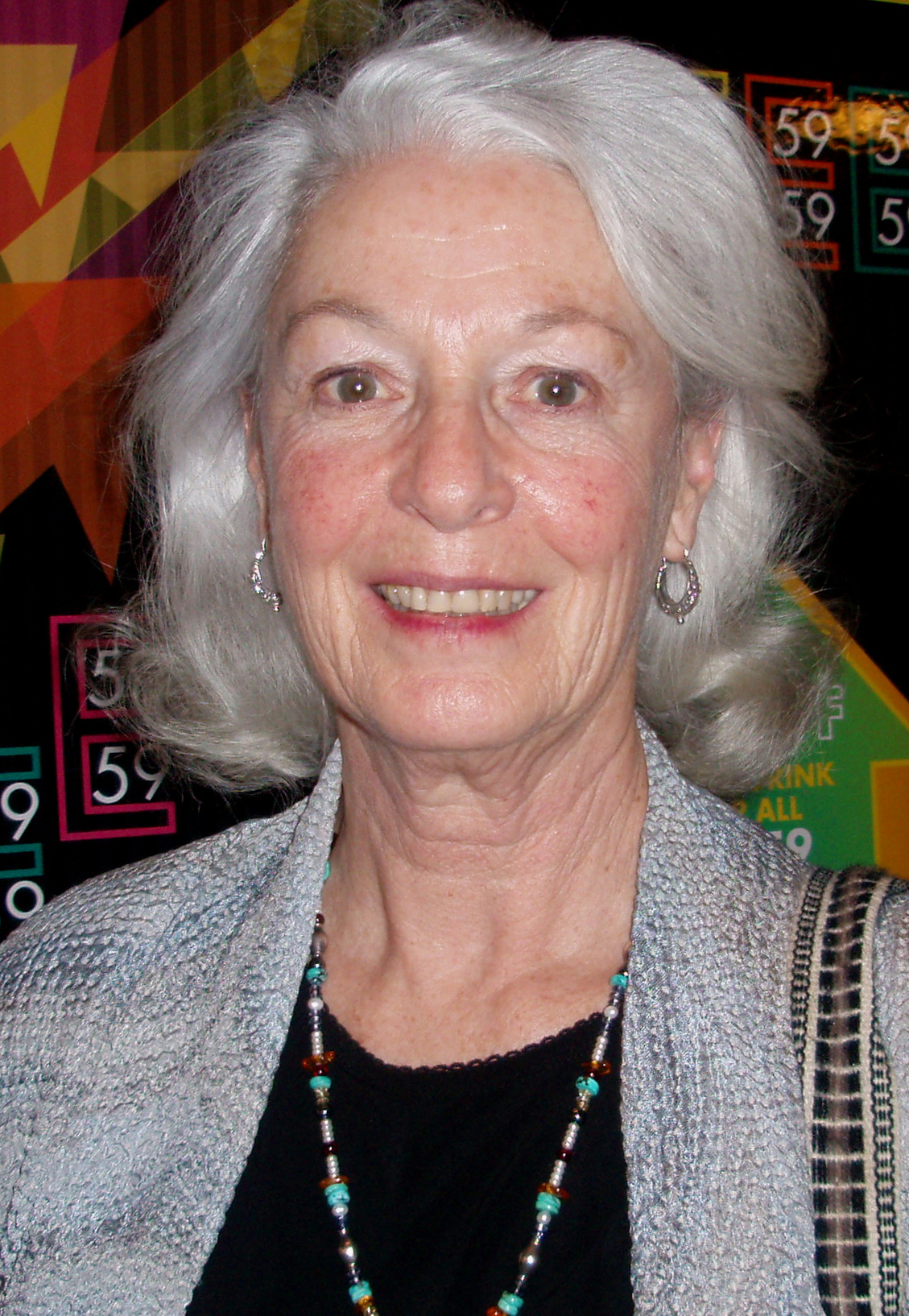
Patricia Arquette and Jane Alexander's performances received critical acclaim, and Emmy nominations for Outstanding Supporting Actress in a Drama Series and Outstanding Guest Actress in a Drama Series respectively.

"Sweet Vitriol" received generally positive reviews from critics. Saloni Gajjar of The A.V. Club gave the episode a "B" and wrote, "Even a below-average episode of Severance can be an enjoyable time [but] pacing wise, 'Sweet Vitriol' feels like a setback. To abruptly halt the action for a Harmony [Cobel] backstory is jarring and, frankly, a little boring."

Alan Sepinwall of Rolling Stone wrote, "Severance [has] put its ongoing plots on hold in favor of worldbuilding and backstory. 'Sweet Vitriol' plays a bit more as a stall for [the] endgame than a story that needed to take up an entire episode." Ben Travers of IndieWire gave the episode an "A-" and wrote, "'Sweet Vitriol' instills Harmony with a tragic backstory. But she's not dead, nor is she truly sympathetic. A villain with unfortunate origins is still a villain. The question now becomes whether she's on the road to redemption."

Erin Qualey of Vulture gave the episode a 4 star rating out of 5 and wrote, "It's certainly a risk to give Cobel her own standalone installment — but the narrative reveals much about Lumon, and also delivers a huge bombshell twist. I think it mostly works." Sean T. Collins of Decider wrote, "a show this fixated on calibrating behavior can't shoulder-shrug away behavior that's inconsistent or inexplicable. Unless we're given a good reason Devon and Mark trust Cobel — or until we find out they don't — it's hard to trust we'll find what we're looking for [at] our destination."

Brady Langman of Esquire wrote, "Writing about an uneventful Severance episode is not a privilege because 'Sweet Vitriol' drops a reveal [that] is nuclear enough for one single episode of television." Erik Kain of Forbes wrote, "Cobel is [now] an entirely different character with a much more vital, fundamental part in the story. This alone is a lot to swallow, but there's a part of me that keeps thinking this was a change made after Season 1. This was something not in the story from day-one, but tacked on as a twist for Season 2. It doesn't quite fit as organically in the story as everything else, and it worries me. It worries me [because] I don't want this to go off the rails and this moment feels a little off the rails."

Jeff Ewing of Collider wrote, "Rather than being just a mere floor manager, Cobel will prove a far more powerful foe to Lumon. [It] seems like Devon's instinct to call her might have been the best move." Breeze Riley of Telltale TV gave the episode a 3.5 star rating out of 5 and wrote, "Although this episode hews much more closely to the usual Severance visuals than ... 'Chikhai Bardo,' it's still a risk. Spending an entire episode on the villain of the show requires the audience to care about her."
