= The After Hours (Severance) =

- Severance episode
- Burt drives Irving to a train station before their departure.
- Episode no.: Season 2 Episode 9
- Directed by: Uta Briesewitz
- Written by: Dan Erickson
- Cinematography by: David Lanzenberg
- Editing by: Joe Landauer
- Original release date: March 13, 2025 (Note: The episode was promoted with the global release date of March 14, but released in American time zones on the preceding evening.)
- Running time: 44 minutes

Guest appearances
- Merritt Wever as Gretchen George; Robby Benson as Dr. Mauer; Ólafur Darri Ólafsson as Mr. Drummond; Michael Siberry as Jame Eagan

Episode chronology
← Previous "Sweet Vitriol"	Next → "Cold Harbor"

"The After Hours" is the ninth and penultimate episode of the second season of the American science fiction psychological thriller television series Severance. It is the 18th overall episode of the series and was written by series creator Dan Erickson, and directed by Uta Briesewitz. It was released on Apple TV+ on March 13, 2025.

The series follows employees of Lumon Industries, a biotechnology corporation that uses a medical procedure called "severance" to separate the memories of their employees: at work, Lumon employees, called "innies", can't remember anything outside of work. Outside work, Lumon employees, called "outies", can't remember anything about work. As a result, innies and outies experience two different lives, with distinct personalities and agendas. In the episode, Mark and Devon enlist Cobel to help them awaken Mark's innie, Helly investigates a clue left behind by Irving in Mark's absence, and Dylan and Irving each reach a crossroads.

The episode received positive reviews from critics, who praised the performances, although some considered the resolution of certain subplots to be rushed. Tramell Tillman and Zach Cherry submitted the episode to support their Emmy nominations for Outstanding Supporting Actor in a Drama Series, with Tillman winning.

== Plot ==
Helena Eagan practices swimming before having breakfast with her father Jame, whose home is located across from Lumon headquarters. She tells him that Irving is being dealt with. At Lumon, Miss Huang completes her Wintertide Fellowship, and Milchick tells her she will be in charge of "stewarding global reforms" at the Gunnel Eagan Empathy Center in Svalbard rather than completing her quarter as deputy manager of the severed floor. He then makes her destroy her ring toss game as a "material sacrifice" as required by the Lumon handbook.

Gretchen confesses to Dylan that she kissed his innie during a visitation session; an irate Dylan threatens to quit and thereby end his innie's existence. Gretchen visits Dylan's innie to tell him they must stop seeing each other; Dylan professes his love for Gretchen and proposes to her using a makeshift wedding ring he made from office perks, but she tearfully turns him down and bids him farewell. A despondent Dylan talks to Helly, who tries telling him that Irving was more family to him than Gretchen, but he lashes out at her. Dylan later fills out a resignation request form and gives it to Milchick, feeling there is nothing left for him as an innie. Helly, meanwhile, goes to the break room to recover Irving's drawing of the exports hall (Note: As seen in "Trojan's Horse".) and begins memorizing the directions written on the back.

Mark and Devon drive to a secluded area to rendezvous with Cobel, to whom they have disclosed details of Mark's reintegration. (Note: As seen in "Sweet Vitriol".) Devon asks for Cobel's help in accessing the Lumon-owned Damona Birthing Retreat (Note: As seen in "The Grim Barbarity of Optics and Design".) in hopes of reawakening Mark's innie for answers about Gemma. Cobel tells the two about the Cold Harbor file, warning that if Mark's innie completes it, Gemma will die. Mark remains deeply distrustful of Cobel, but Devon convinces him to follow their plan.

Mark's absence from work alarms Dr. Mauer and Mr. Drummond, as it is the day the Cold Harbor file was to be completed; Drummond castigates Milchick for losing track of Mark, but Milchick stands his ground, asserting that he is not responsible for Mark's activities outside of the office and rebuffing Drummond for not treating him with more respect. Following Cobel's advice, Mark calls Milchick to inform him he's taking the day off. Milchick asks about his whereabouts, but Mark simply tells him he needed a day away from work and asks Milchick whether Lumon really believes in work-life balance. Milchick grants him the day off on the promise that Mark will return to work the next day.

Meanwhile, Irving returns home to find Burt waiting for him; Burt, having uncovered Irving's investigation into Lumon employees, confronts him over suspecting him as a Lumon enforcer and has Irving join him for a drive. In the car, Burt reveals that he worked as a Lumon driver transporting various persons of interest, claiming not to know their fates afterwards. He takes Irving to a train station and buys him a ticket, telling him he can never return. Irving admits he has never been loved before and tells Burt he wants to pursue a relationship with him, but Burt refuses. Irving boards the train along with his dog, Radar, and departs from Kier.

As night falls, Helly remains in the office memorizing the directions to the exports hall, but Jame walks in on her. Cobel drives Devon and Mark to the birthing retreat, where Mark reawakens as his innie. Devon brings him to meet face-to-face with Cobel, at whose behest he repeats the last thing he said to Devon: "She's alive." (Note: As seen in "The We We Are".)

== Production ==
=== Development ===
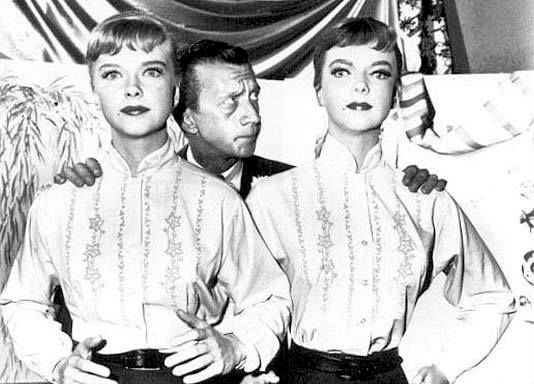
Publicity photo for the Twilight Zone episode "The After Hours", after which this episode is named

The episode was written by series creator Dan Erickson, and directed by Uta Briesewitz. This marked Erickson's sixth writing credit, and Briesewitz's second directing credit.

The episode is named for the episode "The After Hours" of the Twilight Zone in which a woman named Marsha White is directed to a non-existent ninth floor of a department store where she purchases a gold thimble. Cobel's dialogue at the birthing cabins references the episode.

=== Writing ===
Questioned over why Devon would seek help from Cobel, Jen Tullock explained, "I don't think that she does trust her. I think she's in a moment of abject desperation. One of the only situations in which she would be willing to work with someone she now hates as much as Cobel is a family member being in danger, which she now knows Gemma is." She added, "There's a moment where I go to touch his arm, and he tenses up, and I remember my eyes welled up in the moment, because it was just so sad to be like, 'This is my brother I grew up with, and in this moment, he does not know me.' I was grateful that we got to see those moments between them and how much it transpired since that conversation in Season 1."

On Miss Huang leaving, Sarah Bock said, "First, she's a child on the Severed Floor, which is so sad. And then now she's being shipped off to another icy place all by herself, with no parents. And she was finally getting used to the Severed Floor and now she's leaving again. I think it's heartbreaking."

=== Filming ===
The plate used by Helena for her breakfast was an antique found by prop master Catherine Miller.

== Critical reception ==
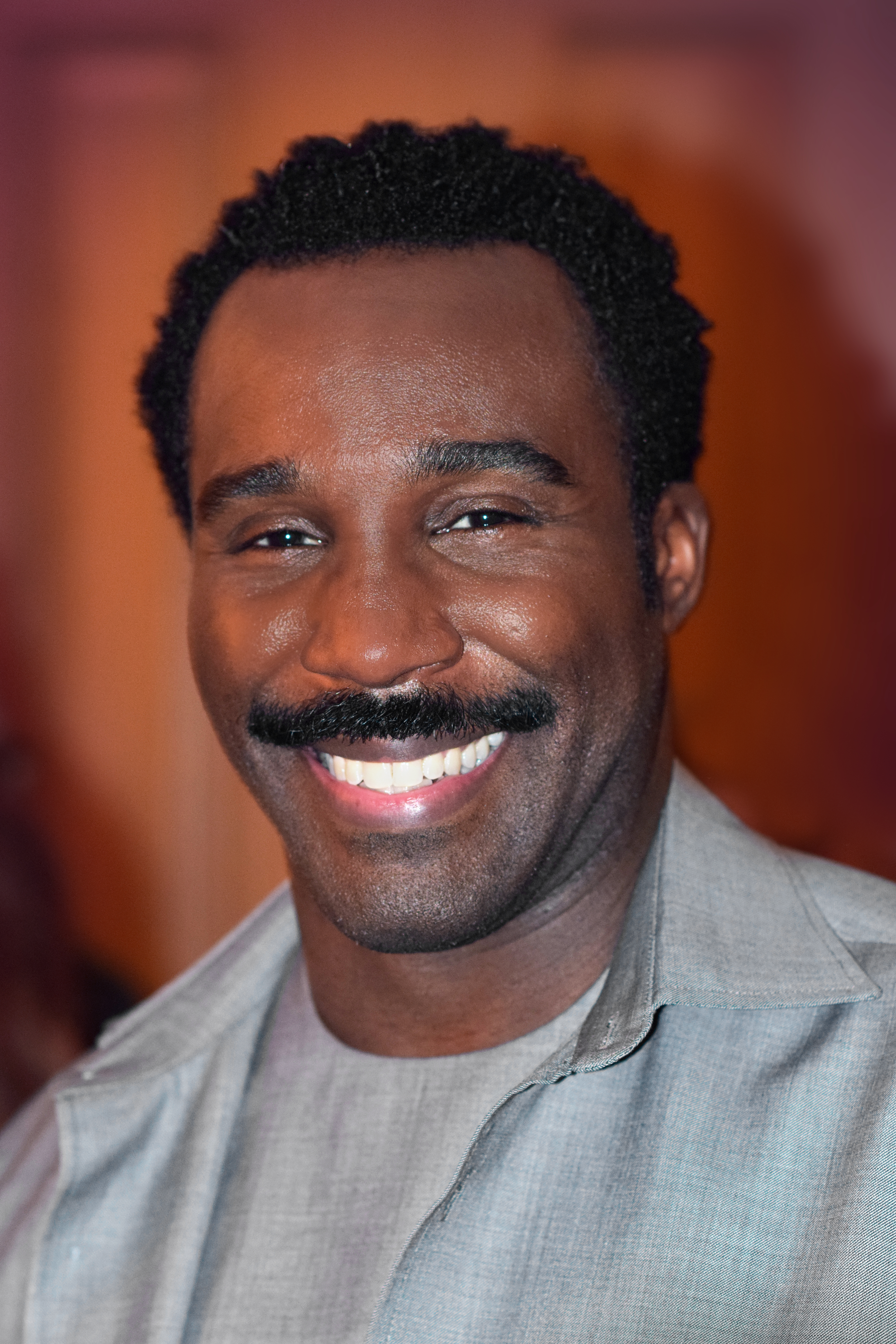
Tramell Tillman's performance garnered widespread critical acclaim, and won the Primetime Emmy Award for Outstanding Supporting Actor in a Drama Series.

"The After Hours" received highly positive reviews from critics. Saloni Gajjar of The A.V. Club gave the episode a "B+" and wrote, "The last couple of episodes have deviated from the main narrative anyway to focus on important backstories, so this table-setting is somewhat necessary to get back into the game. "The After Hours" straightforwardly accomplishes two major things to brace for the season closer. It very leisurely progresses outie Mark and innie Helly's individual stories that are bound to collide in a big way, while also seemingly wrapping up — far too quickly, in my opinion — everything going on with the remaining characters."

Alan Sepinwall of Rolling Stone wrote, "'The After Hours' has some pacing issues of its own, particularly in how the season keeps straining to save whatever Harmony intends for the two Marks to do until next week's finale. But it also takes us back to Lumon headquarters, to the severed floor, and to elsewhere in town, to provide a chance to check in with everyone else prior to the finale. And in the process, it's an excellent table-setter for whatever Severance has planned next." Ben Travers of IndieWire gave the episode a "B+" and wrote, "While Irving chooses to live rather than risk death to be with Burt, Dylan chooses to die rather than risk living without his family. Now, their fates are tied to Mark, Helly, and Harmony. Will their leaps of faith land on firm ground, or will the unknown remain frustratingly out of reach? Here's hoping everyone, somehow, finds their way home."

Erin Qualey of Vulture gave the episode a perfect 5 star rating out of 5 and wrote, "It has been said that Severance is playing a game of chess while many other TV shows are playing checkers. This is certainly true — the show engages in intricate and intimate world-building like few other series on television. And the penultimate episode of season two almost plays like an actual chess match, deftly moving pieces off the board to set up an epic final showdown." Sean T. Collins of Decider wrote, "This week's penultimate episode of Season 2 really makes you realize just how much you haven't learned about what's actually going on, and how much you haven't seen the core cast interact, and how much it isn't like the first season that brought the audience of Apple TV+'s most buzzworthy show to the dance."

Brady Langman of Esquire wrote, "After ['Chikhai Bardo'] and ['Sweet Vitriol'] spent so much time with Gemma and Cobel, respectively, 'The After Hours' feels like it's cramming for the test that is the season 2 finale. In a breezy 47 minutes, Severance speeds through closure for Burt and Irving, Outie Mark and Cobel's team-up, the crumbling of Outie and Innie Dylan, and much more. I understand that this is all in service of what's reportedly a supersized finale, but it feels like a lot of jigsaw puzzles just locked into place in a very short amount of time." Erik Kain of Forbes wrote, "This was a really strong episode and I'm glad we're back to the main cast and Lumon and back on track after two weeks of side stories."

Jeff Ewing of Collider wrote, "Severance Episode 9 is both thrilling and heartbreaking at the same time. It shows that Lumon is losing control (ironically, on the verge of their evident success). They've seemingly lost Helly altogether, and have at least lost Burt's loyalty where Irving's concerned." Breeze Riley of Telltale TV gave the episode a perfect 5 star rating out of 5 and wrote, "After slowing things down with the standalone Gemma and Cobel episodes, Severance uses its penultimate episode to speed us along to the finale. It's a good thing for fans who were waiting for something to happen, but may make you question even more why it spent the last two episodes ignoring most of these characters."

=== Accolades ===
TVLine named Zach Cherry and Merritt Wever as honorable mentions for the "Performer of the Week" for the week of March 15, 2025, for their performances in the episode. The site wrote, "Dylan and Gretchen's relationship on Severance? Well, it's complicated. Zach Cherry, who usually provides the comic-relief zingers at Lumon, revealed a heart-wrenchingly vulnerable side to Dylan this week as he begged Gretchen to give him a chance, even proposing to her with a ring made out of office supplies. And Merritt Wever skillfully showed us how confused and torn Gretchen was when Dylan popped the question, fighting back tears while recognizing this is the kind of devotion she wishes she’d get from her husband. Gretchen walked away in the end, but the ill-fated love story that Cherry and Wever have conjured up this season will linger with us for a long time."
