= Jane Alexander =

American-Canadian actress (born 1939)

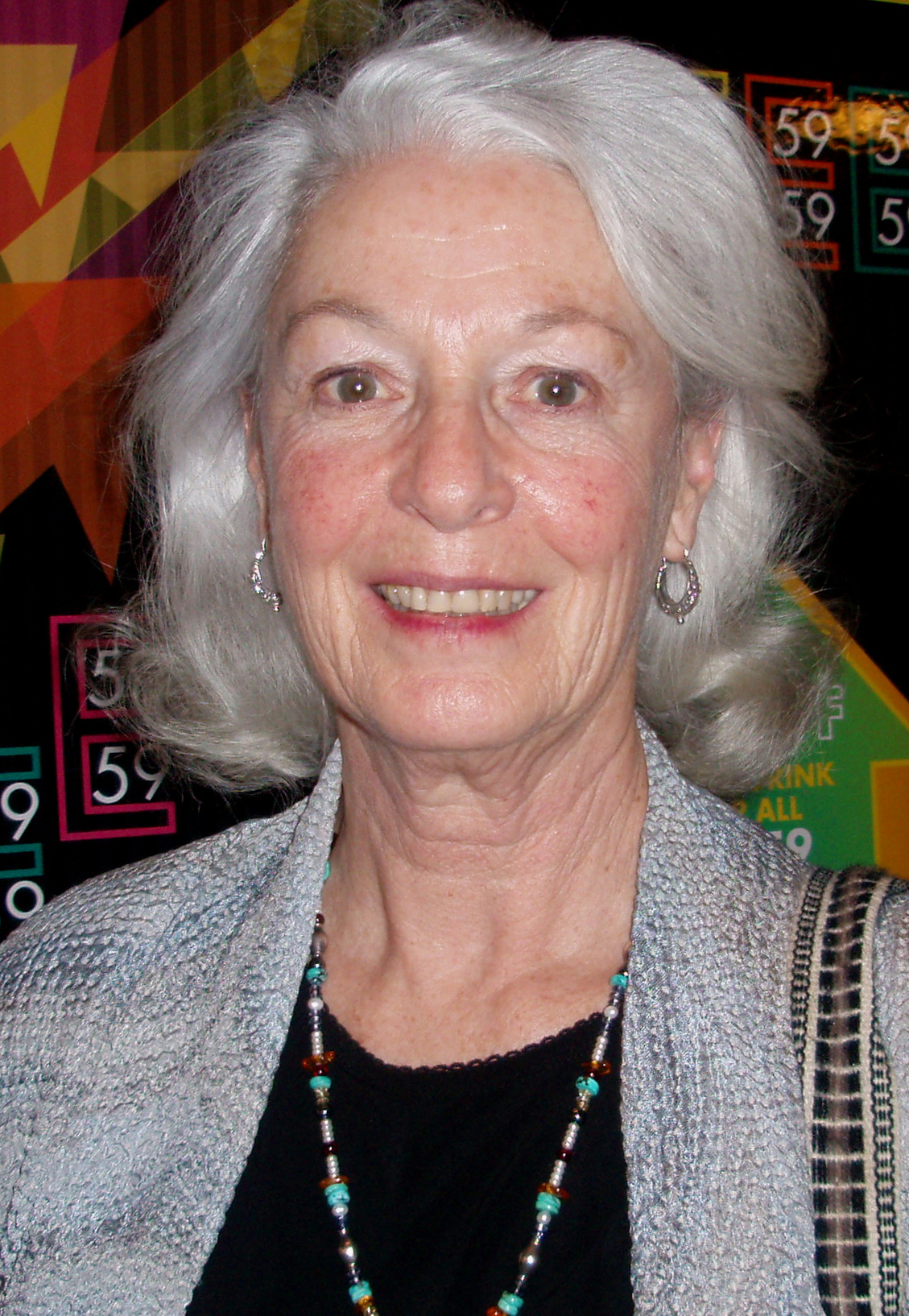
- Alexander in 2008
- Born: Jane Quigley; October 28, 1939 (age 86); Boston, Massachusetts, U.S.
- Education: Sarah Lawrence College (BA)
- Occupation: Actress
- Years active: 1963–present
- Spouses: Robert Alexander (m. 1962; div. 1974) Edwin Sherin (m. 1975; died 2017)
- Children: Jace Alexander
- Relatives: Maddie Corman (daughter-in-law)

Chair of the National Endowment for the Arts
- In office October 1993 – October 1997
- Preceded by: John Frohnmayer
- Succeeded by: Kathryn Higgins

Jane Alexander (née Quigley; born October 28, 1939) is an American-Canadian actress and author. She is the recipient of two Primetime Emmy Awards, a Tony Award, and nominations for four Academy Awards, and three Golden Globe Awards. From 1993 to 1997, Alexander served as the chairwoman of the National Endowment for the Arts.

Alexander won the 1969 Tony Award for Best Featured Actress in a Play for her performance in the Broadway production of The Great White Hope. Other Broadway credits include 6 Rms Riv Vu (1972), The Night of the Iguana (1988), The Sisters Rosensweig (1993) and Honour (1998). She has received a total of eight Tony Award nominations and was inducted into the American Theater Hall of Fame in 1994.

Her film breakthrough came with the romantic drama The Great White Hope (1970), which earned her a nomination for the Academy Award for Best Actress. Her subsequent Oscar nominations were for her roles in All the President's Men (1976), Kramer vs. Kramer (1979), and Testament (1983). An eight-time Emmy nominee, she received her first nomination for playing Eleanor Roosevelt in Eleanor and Franklin (1976), a role that required her to age from 18 to 60. She has won two Primetime Emmy Awards for Playing for Time (1980) and Warm Springs (2005).

== Early life and education ==
Alexander was born Jane Quigley in Boston, Massachusetts, daughter of Ruth Elizabeth (née Pearson), a nurse, and Thomas B. Quigley, an orthopaedic surgeon. She graduated from Beaver Country Day School, an all-girls school in Chestnut Hill outside of Boston, where she discovered her love of acting.

Encouraged by her father to go to college before embarking on an acting career, Alexander attended Sarah Lawrence College in Bronxville, New York, where she concentrated on theater but also studied mathematics with an eye toward computer programming in the event that she failed as an actress. Also while at Sarah Lawrence, she shared an apartment with Hope Cooke, who would become Queen Consort of the last king of Sikkim. Alexander spent her junior year studying at the University of Edinburgh in Scotland where she participated in the Edinburgh University Dramatic Society. The experience solidified her determination to continue acting.

== Career ==
Alexander made her Broadway debut in 1963, replacing Phyllis Wynn as Sandy Dennis' standby in A Thousand Clowns. She reportedly performed the role a handful of times. Alexander's major break in acting came in 1967 when she played Eleanor Backman in the original production of Howard Sackler's The Great White Hope at Arena Stage in Washington, DC. Like her co-star, James Earl Jones, she went on to play the part both on Broadway (1968), winning a Tony Award for her performance, and in the film version (1970), which earned her an Oscar nomination. Alexander's additional screen credits include All the President's Men (1976), Kramer vs. Kramer (1979), and Testament (1983), all of which earned her Oscar nods, Brubaker (1980), The Cider House Rules (1999), and Fur (2006), in which she played Gertrude Nemerov, mother of Diane Arbus, played in the film by Nicole Kidman.

The play The Time of Your Life was revived on March 17, 1972, at the Huntington Hartford Theater in Los Angeles with Alexander, Henry Fonda, Gloria Grahame, Lewis J. Stadlen, Richard Dreyfuss, Ron Thompson, Strother Martin, Richard X. Slattery, and Pepper Martin among the cast with Edwin Sherin directing.

Alexander portrayed Eleanor Roosevelt in two television productions, Eleanor and Franklin (1976) and Eleanor and Franklin: The White House Years (1977); she also played FDR's mother, Sara Delano Roosevelt, in HBO's Warm Springs (2005) with Kenneth Branagh and Cynthia Nixon, a role which garnered her an Emmy Award for Best Supporting Actress.

Alexander co-starred with Rachel Roberts in Steven Gether's teleplay and production of A Circle of Children (1977), based on Mary MacCracken's autobiographical book about emotionally disturbed children (with an emphasis on autism), which won Gether an Emmy. Alexander also starred in its sequel, Lovey: A Circle of Children, Part II (1978).

In 1979, the Supersisters trading card set was produced and distributed; one of the cards featured Alexander's name and picture.

Alexander's other television films include Arthur Miller's Playing for Time, co-starring Vanessa Redgrave, for which Alexander won another Emmy Award; Malice in Wonderland (as famed gossip-monger Hedda Hopper); Blood & Orchids; and In Love and War (1987) co-starring James Woods, which tells the story of James and Sybil Stockdale during Stockdale's eight years as a US prisoner of war in Vietnam. Alexander also played the protagonist, Dr. May Foster, in the HBO drama series Tell Me You Love Me. Her character, a psychotherapist, serves as the connecting link between three couples coping with relational and sexual difficulties. The show's frank portrayal of "senior" sexuality and explicit sex scenes generated controversy, although it won a rare endorsement by the AARP. She also had a minor role as Dr. Graznik in The Ring.

External videos
- Booknotes interview with Alexander on Command Performance: An Actress in the Theater of Politics, August 13, 2000, C-SPAN

In 1993, President Bill Clinton appointed Alexander chairperson of the National Endowment for the Arts, the organization that had provided partial funding for The Great White Hope at Arena Stage. Alexander moved to Washington, DC, and served as chair of the NEA until 1997. Her book, Command Performance: an Actress in the Theater of Politics (2000), describes the challenges she faced heading the NEA at a time when the 104th U.S. Congress, headed by Newt Gingrich, unsuccessfully strove to shut it down. She was elected a fellow of the American Academy of Arts and Sciences in 1999.

In 2004, Alexander, together with her husband, Edwin Sherin, joined the theater faculty at Florida State University. She serves on various boards, including the Wildlife Conservation Society, the National Audubon Society, Project Greenhope, the National Stroke Association, and Women's Action for Nuclear Disarmament, and she has received the Israel Cultural Award and the Helen Caldicott Leadership Award. Alexander is also a fellow of the International Leadership Forum. In 2009 Alexander starred in Thom Thomas's play A Moon to Dance By at the Pittsburgh Playhouse and at the George Street Playhouse in New Brunswick, New Jersey. It was directed by her husband, Edwin Sherin.

In 2026, it was announced that Jane Alexander would star as the lead in the comedy drama film Lillian, Next Door, produced by Wild at Heart Films, Emotion Pictures, and Snarky Elephant Productions

== Personal life ==
Alexander met her first husband, Robert Alexander, in the early 1960s in New York City, where both were pursuing acting careers. They had one son, Jace Alexander, in 1964, and the couple divorced a decade later. Alexander had been acting regularly in various regional theaters when she met producer/director Edwin Sherin in Washington, DC, where he was artistic director at Arena Stage. Alexander starred in the original theatrical production of The Great White Hope under Sherin's direction at Arena Stage prior to the play's Broadway debut. The two became good friends and, once divorced from their respective spouses, became romantically involved, marrying in 1975. Between the two, they have four children, Alexander's son Jace and Sherin's three sons, Tony, Geoffrey, and Jon. She and Sherin became Canadian citizens, having maintained a home in Lockeport, Nova Scotia starting in 1998. Edwin Sherin died at the age of 87, in Nova Scotia, on May 4, 2017.

== Acting credits ==
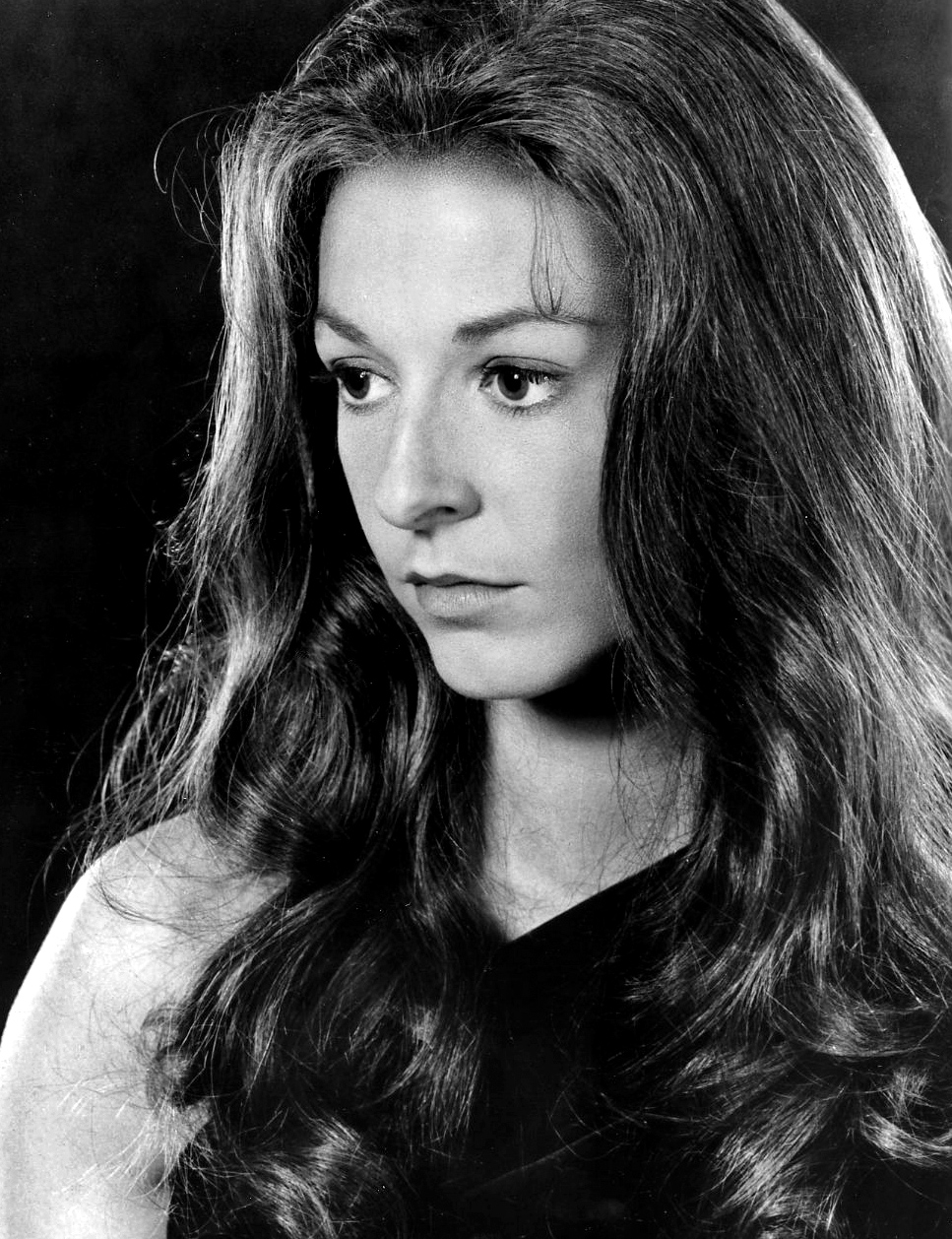
Alexander in the 1960s

=== Film ===
Year	Title	Role	Notes
1970	The Great White Hope	Eleanor Bachman	Nominated—Academy Award for Best Actress; Nominated—Golden Globe Award for Most Promising Newcomer – Female; Nominated—Golden Laurel Award for Star of Tomorrow – Female
1971	A Gunfight	Nora Tenneray	USA title Gunfight
1972	The New Centurions	Dorothy Fehler	a.k.a. Precinct 45: Los Angeles Police
1976	All the President's Men	Judy Hoback Miller	Nominated—Academy Award for Best Supporting Actress
1978	The Betsy	Alicia Hardeman	a.k.a. Harold Robbins' The Betsy
1979	Kramer vs. Kramer	Margaret Phelps	Nominated—Academy Award for Best Supporting Actress; Nominated—Golden Globe Award for Best Supporting Actress – Motion Picture; Nominated—National Society of Film Critics Award for Best Supporting Actress (3rd Place); Nominated—New York Film Critics Circle Award for Best Supporting Actress (2nd Place)
1980	Brubaker	Lillian Gray	
1982	Night Crossing	Doris Strelzyk	
1983	Testament	Carol Wetherly	Nominated—Academy Award for Best Actress; Nominated—Golden Globe Award for Best Actress in a Motion Picture – Drama; Nominated—Los Angeles Film Critics Association Award for Best Actress (2nd Place)
1984	City Heat	Addy	
1987	Sweet Country	Anna	a.k.a. Glykeia patrida (Greece)
1987	Square Dance	Juanelle King	a.k.a. Home Is Where the Heart Is (USA: TV title)
1989	Glory	Sarah Blake Sturgis Shaw	(uncredited)
1999	The Cider House Rules	Nurse Edna	Nominated—Screen Actors Guild Award for Outstanding Performance by a Cast in a Motion Picture
2002	Sunshine State	Delia Temple	
2002	The Ring	Dr. Grasnik	
2006	Fur: An Imaginary Portrait of Diane Arbus	Gertrude Nemerov	
2007	Feast of Love	Esther Stevenson	
2008	Gigantic	Mrs. Weathersby	
2009	The Unborn	Sofi Kozma	
2009	Terminator Salvation	Virginia	
2011	Dream House	Dr. Greeley	
2013	Mr. Morgan's Last Love	Joan Morgan	
2017	Three Christs	Dr. Abraham	
2027	Lillian, Next Door	Lillian	

=== Television ===
Year	Title	Role	Notes
1969	N.Y.P.D.		Episode "The Night Watch"
1969	Adam-12	Flo the Records Clerk	Episode "Log 112: You Blew It" (uncredited)
1972	Welcome Home, Johnny Bristol	Anne Palmer	
1973	Miracle on 34th Street	Karen Walker	
1974	This Is the West That Was	Sarah Shaw	
1975	Death Be Not Proud	Frances Gunther	
1976	Eleanor and Franklin	Eleanor Roosevelt, age 18–60	Nominated—Primetime Emmy Award for Outstanding Lead Actress in a Drama or Comedy Special
1977	A Circle of Children	Mary MacCracken	CBS two night mini-series adapted from Mary MacCracken's autobiographical book.
1977	Eleanor and Franklin: The White House Years	Eleanor Roosevelt	Nominated—Primetime Emmy Award for Outstanding Lead Actress in a Drama or Comedy Special
1978	A Question of Love	Barbara Moreland	a.k.a. A Purely Legal Matter
1978	Lovey: A Circle of Children, Part II	Mary MacCracken	Two night mini-series adapted from Mary MacCracken's second autobiographical book.
1980	Playing for Time	Alma Rose	Primetime Emmy Award for Outstanding Supporting Actress in a Limited Series or a Special
1981	Dear Liar	Mrs. Patrick Campbell	
1982	In the Custody of Strangers	Sandy Caldwell	
1984	When She Says No	Nora Strangis	
1984	Calamity Jane	Martha Jane "Calamity Jane" Canary	Bronze Wrangler Award for Fictional Television Drama; Nominated—Primetime Emmy Award for Outstanding Lead Actress in a Limited Series or a Special
1985	Malice in Wonderland	Hedda Hopper	a.k.a. The Rumor Mill; Nominated—Primetime Emmy Award for Outstanding Lead Actress in a Limited Series or a Special
1986	Blood & Orchids	Doris Ashley	
1987	In Love and War	Sybil Stockdale	
1988	A Friendship in Vienna	Hannah Dournenvald	Nominated—CableACE Award for Best Supporting Actress in a Miniseries or Movie
1988	Open Admissions	Ginny Carlsen	
1990	Daughter of the Streets	Peggy Ryan	
1991	A Marriage: Georgia O'Keeffe and Alfred Stieglitz	Georgia O'Keeffe	
1992	Stay the Night	Blanche Kettman	
1993	New Year	Elsie Robertson	
2000	Law & Order: Special Victims Unit	Regina Mulroney	Episode: "Entitled" (also for Law & Order episode "Entitled: Part 2"); Nominated—Primetime Emmy Award for Outstanding Guest Actress in a Drama Series
2000	Law & Order	Regina Mulroney	Episode: "Entitled: Part 2"
2001	Jenifer	Marilyn Estess	
2001	Bitter Winter		
2004	Freedom: A History of Us	Jane Addams	Episode: "Yearning to Breathe Free"
2004	Carry Me Home	Mrs. Gortimer	Nominated—Daytime Emmy Award for Outstanding Performer in a Children/Youth/Family Special
2005	Warm Springs	Sara Delano Roosevelt	Primetime Emmy Award for Outstanding Supporting Actress in a Miniseries or a Movie; Nominated—Satellite Award for Best Supporting Actress – Series, Miniseries or Television Film
2006	The Way	Helen Warden	
2007	Tell Me You Love Me	Dr. May Foster	10 episodes
2008	Louisa May Alcott	Ednah Cheney	
2011	Deck the Halls	Nora Regan Reilly	
2011–2015	The Good Wife	Judge Suzanne Morris	5 episodes
2011	William & Catherine: A Royal Romance	Queen Elizabeth II	
2013–2014	The Blacklist	Diane Fowler	4 episodes
2013	Forgive Me	Bookie	5 episodes
2014	The Divide	Elizabeth	2 episodes
2014–2016	Elementary	C.	2 episodes
2015	The Book of Negroes	Maria Witherspoon	Episode #1.5
2015	Forever	Nora Morgan	Episode: "Social Engineering"
2017–2018	The Good Fight	Judge Suzanne Morris	2 episodes
2019	Modern Love	Margot	Episode: "The Race Grows Sweeter Near Its Final Lap"
2020	Tales From The Loop	Klara	3 episodes
2025	Severance	Celestine "Sissy" Cobel	Episode: "Sweet Vitriol"; Nominated—Primetime Emmy Award for Outstanding Guest Actress in a Drama Series
2026	American Classic	Ethel Bean	Episode: "Swan Song"

=== Theater ===
Date	Production	Role	Notes
October 3, 1968 – January 31, 1970	The Great White Hope	Eleanor Bachman	Tony Award for Best Supporting or Featured Actress in a Play; Drama Desk Award for Outstanding Actress in a Play; Theatre World Award
October 17, 1972 – May 19, 1973	6 Rms Riv Vu	Anne Miller	Nominated—Tony Award for Best Leading Actress in a Play
December 13, 1973 – May 4, 1974	Find Your Way Home	Jacqueline Harrison	Nominated—Tony Award for Best Leading Actress in a Play
December 17, 1975 – January 25, 1976	Hamlet	Gertrude	
April 20, 1976 – May 9, 1976	The Heiress	Catherine Sloper	
October 3, 1978 – December 9, 1978	First Monday in October	Judge Ruth Loomis	Nominated—Tony Award for Best Leading Actress in a Play
April 23, 1980 – April 26, 1980	Goodbye Fidel	Natalia	
1981 (limited run starting in October)	Hedda Gabler	Hedda	
December 14, 1982 – December 18, 1982	Monday After the Miracle	Annie	
1984 (limited run starting in January)	Old Times	Anna	
June 26, 1988 – September 4, 1988	The Night of the Iguana	Maxine Faulk	(revival)
November 11, 1990 – April 7, 1991	Shadowlands	Joy Davidman	
January 23, 1992 – March 1, 1992	The Visit	Claire Zachanassian	Nominated—Tony Award for Best Leading Actress in a Play; Nominated—Drama Desk Award for Outstanding Actress in a Play
March 18, 1993 – July 16, 1994	The Sisters Rosensweig	Sara Goode	Drama Desk Award for Outstanding Actress in a Play; Nominated—Tony Award for Best Leading Actress in a Play
April 26, 1998 – June 14, 1998	Honour	Honor	Nominated—Tony Award for Best Leading Actress in a Play
December 23, 2019 – March 1, 2020	Grand Horizons	Nancy	Nominated—Tony Award for Best Featured Actress in a Play

== Awards and nominations ==
Year	Award	Category	Nominated work	Results	Ref.
1971	Academy Awards	Best Actress	The Great White Hope	Nominated	
1977	Academy Awards	Best Supporting Actress	All the President's Men	Nominated	
1980	Academy Awards	Best Supporting Actress	Kramer vs. Kramer	Nominated	
1984	Academy Awards	Best Actress	Testament	Nominated	
2013	ACTRA Awards	Outstanding Performance by a Female in TV or Feature	Forgive Me	Won	
1989	CableACE Awards	Supporting Actress in a Movie or Miniseries	A Friendship in Vienna	Nominated	
2014	Canadian Screen Awards	Best Actress in a Featured Supporting Role in a Dramatic Program or Series	Forgive Me	Nominated	
2005	Daytime Emmy Awards	Outstanding Performer in a Children/Youth/Family Special	Carry Me Home	Nominated	
1969	Drama Desk Awards	Outstanding Performance	The Great White Hope	Won	
1992	Drama Desk Awards	Outstanding Actress in a Play	The Visit	Nominated	
1993	Drama Desk Awards	Outstanding Actress in a Play	The Sisters Rosensweig	Won	
2009	Drama League Awards	Distinguished Performance Award	Chasing Manet	Nominated	
2012	Drama League Awards	Distinguished Performance Award	The Lady from Dubuque	Nominated	
1971	Golden Globe Awards	Most Promising Newcomer – Female	The Great White Hope	Nominated	
1980	Golden Globe Awards	Best Supporting Actress – Motion Picture	Kramer vs. Kramer	Nominated	
1984	Golden Globe Awards	Best Actress in a Motion Picture – Drama	Testament	Nominated	
2005	High Falls Film Festival	The Faith Hubley "Web of Life" Award	—N/a	Won	
1970	Laurel Awards	Star of Tomorrow – Female	The Great White Hope	8th Place	
1983	Los Angeles Film Critics Association Awards	Best Actress	Testament	Runner-up	
1979	National Society of Film Critics Awards	Best Supporting Actress	Kramer vs. Kramer	3rd Place	
1979	New York Film Critics Circle Awards	Best Supporting Actress	Kramer vs. Kramer	Runner-up	
1993	New York Women in Film & Television	Muse Award	—N/a	Won	
2000	Online Film & Television Association Awards	Best Guest Actress in a Drama Series	Law & Order / Law & Order: Special Victims Unit	Nominated	
2005	Online Film & Television Association Awards	Best Supporting Actress in a Motion Picture or Miniseries	Warm Springs	Nominated	
2014	Online Film & Television Association Awards	Best Guest Actress in a Drama Series	The Blacklist	Nominated	
1976	Primetime Emmy Awards	Outstanding Lead Actress in a Drama or Comedy Special	Eleanor and Franklin	Nominated	
1977	Primetime Emmy Awards	Outstanding Lead Actress in a Drama or Comedy Special	Eleanor and Franklin: The White House Years	Nominated	
1981	Primetime Emmy Awards	Outstanding Supporting Actress in a Limited Series or a Special	Playing for Time	Won	
1984	Primetime Emmy Awards	Outstanding Lead Actress in a Limited Series or a Special	Calamity Jane	Nominated	
1985	Primetime Emmy Awards	Outstanding Lead Actress in a Limited Series or a Special	Malice in Wonderland	Nominated	
2000	Primetime Emmy Awards	Outstanding Guest Actress in a Drama Series	Law & Order: Special Victims Unit (Episode: "Entitled")	Nominated	
2005	Primetime Emmy Awards	Outstanding Supporting Actress in a Miniseries or a Movie	Warm Springs	Won	
2025	Primetime Emmy Awards	Outstanding Guest Actress in a Drama Series	Severance (Episode: "Sweet Vitriol")	Nominated	
2017	RiverRun International Film Festival	Master of Cinema Award	—N/a	Won	
2005	Satellite Awards	Best Supporting Actress in a Series, Miniseries or Motion Picture Made for Television	Warm Springs	Nominated	
1999	Screen Actors Guild Awards	Outstanding Performance by a Cast in a Motion Picture	The Cider House Rules	Nominated	
1969	Theatre World Awards		The Great White Hope	Won	
1969	Tony Awards	Best Supporting or Featured Actress in a Play	The Great White Hope	Won	
1973	Tony Awards	Best Leading Actress in a Play	6 Rms Riv Vu	Nominated	
1974	Tony Awards	Best Leading Actress in a Play	Find Your Way Home	Nominated	
1979	Tony Awards	Best Leading Actress in a Play	First Monday in October	Nominated	
1992	Tony Awards	Best Leading Actress in a Play	The Visit	Nominated	
1993	Tony Awards	Best Leading Actress in a Play	The Sisters Rosensweig	Nominated	
1998	Tony Awards	Best Leading Actress in a Play	Honour	Nominated	
2020	Tony Awards	Best Featured Actress in a Play	Grand Horizons	Nominated	
1985	Western Heritage Awards	Fictional Television Drama	Calamity Jane	Won	
1996	Women in Film Crystal + Lucy Awards	Norma Zarky Humanitarian Award	—N/a	Won	

== See also ==
- List of Primetime Emmy Award winners

Political offices
Preceded by John Frohnmayer	Chair of the National Endowment for the Arts; 1993–1997	Succeeded by Kathryn Higgins; Acting
