= A Friendship in Vienna =

- Genre: Drama; History
- Based on: The Devil in Vienna by Doris Orgel
- Written by: Richard Alfieri
- Directed by: Arthur Allan Seidelman
- Starring: Edward Asner; Stephen Macht; Jenny Lewis; Kamie Harper; Rosemary Forsyth; Jane Alexander
- Narrated by: Jean Simmons
- Music by: Lee Holdridge
- Country of origin: United States
- Original language: English

Production
- Producers: Christopher Morgan; Sheldon Pinchuk
- Cinematography: Hanania Baer
- Editor: Bert Glatstein
- Running time: 100 minutes
- Production companies: Walt Disney Television; Finnegan/Pinchuk Productions

Original release
- Network: Disney Channel
- Release: August 27, 1988

A Friendship in Vienna is a 1988 American historical drama film based on Doris Orgel's popular children's book The Devil in Vienna. The film starred Jane Alexander, Stephen Macht and Edward Asner and premiered on August 27, 1988.

== Plot ==
Lise Mueller (Kamie Harper) and Inge Dourenvald (Jenny Lewis) are 13-ish-year-old best friends in Austria of 1938, in the days before and during the Anschluss. Lise is Catholic and Inge is Jewish. Trouble comes since Lise's father is a Nazi sympathizer who travels to and from Germany to get ready to join the paramilitary Nazi SA upon the upcoming Anschluss, bringing her mother, who is helpless to do anything about it, and her older brother, Heinz, who is himself a Nazi sympathizer like his father. Lise's father forbids Inge to visit them anymore and Inge's parents do likewise with Lise. But they both meet in secret, ex. the large cathedral in Vienna.

Despite his opposition to Inge's friendship with Lise, Inge's father, Franz, refuses to believe Hitler would annex Austria; he disregards Grandfather Oskar's warnings to apply for immigration quota visas for himself or his family to get them safely out of Austria and out of the rest of Europe altogether. When the Anschluss finally happens in March 1938, Lise's father becomes a high ranking Nazi SA officer, requiring Lise to join a girls' Hitler Youth organization, wear its uniform, attend the upcoming welcoming procession of Hitler into Vienna and give the Sieg Heil salute.

The Nazis start implementing their bigoted laws, e.g. removing Jewish teachers from the public schools, destroying books and other arts materials with non-Aryan characters and publicly humiliating Jewish men by making them wash the pro-independence slogans off of walls and sidewalks with only their toothbrushes. The schoolbooks in Lise's and Inge's school with their Jewish characters in them are also removed. All Jewish students are required to sit in the less desirable back seats of classrooms (which would be followed by their eventual expulsions from schools altogether). Lise decides to sit next to Inge after being told not to and is sadistically beaten by her father for it.

Oskar gets his visa for Yugoslavia and leaves. Hannah is fired from her editing job through messenger boy Gustl after 14 years under the claim of "needed cutbacks" and is sure the "Aryanization board" will eventually keep Jews out of all employment to further isolate them from society. Franz warns Inge that Lise's father is high up in Nazi Party ranks and could end the embarrassment of his "Aryan" daughter being friends with a Jew by having their whole family arrested.

Later, Franz is threatened by Gustl with false accusations of "indecorous" (improper) behavior with their Aryan maid, Mitzi, who still enjoys working for them despite the new laws that will soon make such employment illegal, whether she wants to leave or not. Gustl says he'll "forget" these claims only if the Dourenvalds pay him 10,000 schillings before his scheduled appointment with the "block warden", money that the Dourenvalds don't have despite Nazi propaganda that claims all Jews are rich money hoarders.

Later, Hannah is told by the Yugoslav consul in Vienna that it is now required to have been a baptized Christian since 1936 or earlier to enter Yugoslovia at all and to provide baptismal certificates as proof thereof. The Dourenvalds are now at a loss since even if they could "transform" themselves into Christians, they wouldn't be able to find a priest that would baptize them and predate their certificates to 1936, until Inge tells them about Father Bernard at the cathedral. Bernard hesitates on respective spiritual and legal laws that such a ritual and certification would violate. But Lise convinces him that leaving innocent people in danger would be an even greater violation of God's laws.

The baptism is administered, the Dourenvalds get their visas, and the next day, bid Mitzi farewell and tell her she can have whatever possessions of theirs that she wants, as they can't take them with them, and board a train leaving Austria with Gustl and his friends on their trail. Inge says her last goodbye to Lise and gives her a golden Jewish star. Jean Simmons' voiceover ends the film by saying that she ("Inge") wrote to Lise often after leaving Austria but never received any responses and didn't know if it was because Lise's father destroyed Inge's letters when Lise got them or kept her from writing back and also knew then when they were departing that it would be the last time she would ever see or hear from Lise.

== Cast ==
- Edward Asner as Opah Oskar Reikman
- Kamie Harper as Lise Mueller
- Stephen Macht as Franz Dournenvald
- Jenny Lewis as Inge Dourenvald
- Rosemary Forsyth as Inge's and Lise's main teacher
- Jane Alexander as Hannah Dournenvald
