= Honour (Murray-Smith play) =

Play by Joanna Murray-Smith

Honour is a 1995 play by the Australian playwright Joanna Murray-Smith.

It tells the tale of a middle-aged man, George, who leaves his wife, Honor, and their 24-year-old daughter, Sophie, for a relationship with a much younger woman by the name of Claudia.

It was first performed in Melbourne on 14 November 1995 and has since been performed in more than three dozen countries, including on Broadway and in the West End.

== Characters ==
- Honor, a beautiful, elegant woman aged around sixty
- George, an attractive, youthful man, aged around sixty
- Sophie, their 24-year-old daughter
- Claudia, a striking woman, aged around thirty

== Notable productions ==
Role	World Premiere, 14 November 1995 Playbox Theatre, Melbourne, Australia	Broadway Premiere, April 1998 Belasco Theatre, New York City	West End Premiere, 27 February 2003 Royal National Theatre, London	West End Revival, 14 February 2006 Wyndham's Theatre, London
Honor	Julia Blake	Jane Alexander	Eileen Atkins	Diana Rigg
George	John Gregg	Robert Foxworth	Corin Redgrave	Martin Jarvis
Sophie	Belinda McClory	Enid Graham	Anna Maxwell Martin	Georgina Rich
Claudia	Natasha Herbert	Laura Linney	Catherine McCormack	Natascha McElhone
Director	Ariette Taylor	Gerald Gutierrez	Roger Michell	David Grindley
