= Attila (Severance) =

- Severance episode
- Mark encounters Helena at a Chinese restaurant.
- Episode no.: Season 2 Episode 6
- Directed by: Uta Briesewitz
- Written by: Erin Wagoner
- Cinematography by: David Lanzenberg
- Editing by: Joe Landauer
- Original release date: February 20, 2025 (Note: The episode was promoted with the global release date of February 21, but released in American time zones on the preceding evening.)
- Running time: 48 minutes

Guest appearances
- John Noble as Fields; Merritt Wever as Gretchen George; Ólafur Darri Ólafsson as Mr. Drummond; Karen Aldridge as Asal Reghabi

Episode chronology
← Previous "Trojan's Horse"	Next → "Chikhai Bardo"

"Attila" is the sixth episode of the second season of the American science fiction psychological thriller television series Severance. It is the 15th overall episode of the series and was written by consulting producer Erin Wagoner, and directed by Uta Briesewitz. It was released on Apple TV+ on February 20, 2025.

The series follows employees of Lumon Industries, a biotechnology corporation that uses a medical procedure called "severance" to separate the memories of their employees: at work, Lumon employees, called "innies", can't remember anything outside of work. Outside work, Lumon employees, called "outies", can't remember anything about work. As a result, innies and outies experience two different lives, with distinct personalities and agendas. In the episode, Helly, whose outie is Lumon executive Helena Eagan, learns that Helena impersonated her during a recent work retreat and decides to form her own memories. Meanwhile, floor manager Milchick takes a day off, while Irving's outie has dinner with Burt's outie.

The episode received highly positive reviews from critics, who praised the performances, tone and cliffhanger, although some had mixed reactions over the storylines not addressed from previous episodes. Britt Lower submitted the episode to support her Emmy nomination for Outstanding Lead Actress in a Drama Series, for which she won.

== Plot ==
Mark tearfully tells Reghabi about his vision of Gemma, (Note: As seen in "Trojan's Horse".) lamenting that she did not seem to recognize him; Reghabi assures him the two will be reunited. In the office, Dylan tells Mark and Helly about finding Irving's drawing and directions to the exports hall in the break room, and Helly decides to go recover it herself. Mark experiences more vivid reintegration hallucinations. Meanwhile, Milchick takes the rest of the day off to address the infractions noted in his performance review, leaving Ms. Huang—revealed to be in a fellowship with Lumon—in charge of the severed floor.

In the bathroom, Mark confesses to Helly that he and Helena slept together during the ORTBO, (Note: As seen in "Woe's Hollow".) and that he genuinely believed it was Helly. Feeling Helena stole this experience from her, Helly decides to create her own such memory and initiates sex with Mark in an unused room on the severed floor. Afterwards, Mark experiences a nosebleed; Ms. Huang performs a medical check on him, but Mark claims he is fine. In the outie visitation suite, Gretchen visits Dylan again, and Dylan says he wishes he could be with her. The two share a passionate kiss. That night, Gretchen lies to Dylan's outie that her visitation session was cancelled.

Meanwhile, Milchick spends time in the supply closet practicing placing paperclips properly and simplifying his speech per the contentions in his performance review, and has an intense moment to himself in a mirror. Mark and Reghabi conduct another reintegration session, but Mark struggles to recall more details about the severed floor. Reghabi suggests surgically "flooding" the severance chip in Mark's brain to accelerate the reintegration process, but Mark swiftly shuts down the idea and storms off. He goes to eat at a restaurant, where Helena arrives and introduces herself to him. The two have a flirtatious conversation where Helena probes for details about the overtime contingency. Helena then brings up Gemma, referring to her by the wrong name; Mark becomes uneasy and leaves.

Meanwhile, Irving joins Burt and his husband Fields for dinner at their home. Burt recalls the pastor at his former church declaring that innies and outies have separate souls, and says he underwent severance in hopes that his innie would go to heaven, feeling his outie is already damned. Fields blurts out that Burt has been with Lumon for twenty years, though Irving notes the severance procedure was only invented twelve years ago; Burt later passes it off as a drunken slip-up. Fields also pointedly asks whether Burt and Irving's innies had unprotected sex, and says he hopes that their love was beautiful. While Irving is at dinner, Mr. Drummond breaks into his home and finds the notes Irving has gathered on Lumon employees. (Note: As seen in "The We We Are".)

Mark returns home and decides to proceed with surgically expediting his reintegration. Reghabi reopens the incision in Mark's skull through which his severance chip was implanted and injects a fluid into the region of his brain containing the chip before resealing the incision. Mark suddenly experiences flashes of having sex with Helly. Reghabi warns him to keep his head still, but Mark hears Devon knocking on his door and goes to receive her. As they talk, he suffers a seizure and collapses; Reghabi rushes in to help Devon revive Mark.

== Production ==
=== Development ===
The episode was written by consulting producer Erin Wagoner, and directed by Uta Briesewitz. This marked Wagoner's first writing credit, and Briesewitz's first directing credit.

=== Writing ===
Regarding Helly's actions, Britt Lower said, "It is a reclamation. It is a brave act to be vulnerable enough to say, “I want this” to Mark. Helly is very rarely rattled by anything, but her heart opening to connection is the scariest thing – not just to Mark, but to her chosen family of Dylan and Irving." She also explained the decision to have Helly take off her heels for the first time in the episode, "I've always felt like Helly has had a hate relationship with her heels. She didn't put them on in the morning. She'd probably rather be wearing boots or something. Just to be able to feel her feet on the tile, I thought, was... she gets to reclaim that, at least, and then it leads to the next action that she takes."

Christopher Walken commented on Burt's new personality, "I've seen certain actors, I've seen them 20 times in movies, and I think I know them a little bit, and then I meet them in person and they're really quite a different person than I thought. It's a surprise. I felt that that's sort of the way it is with Burt. You think you know him, but he's a little bit different. I thought of it as one actor meeting another actor."

== Critical reviews ==
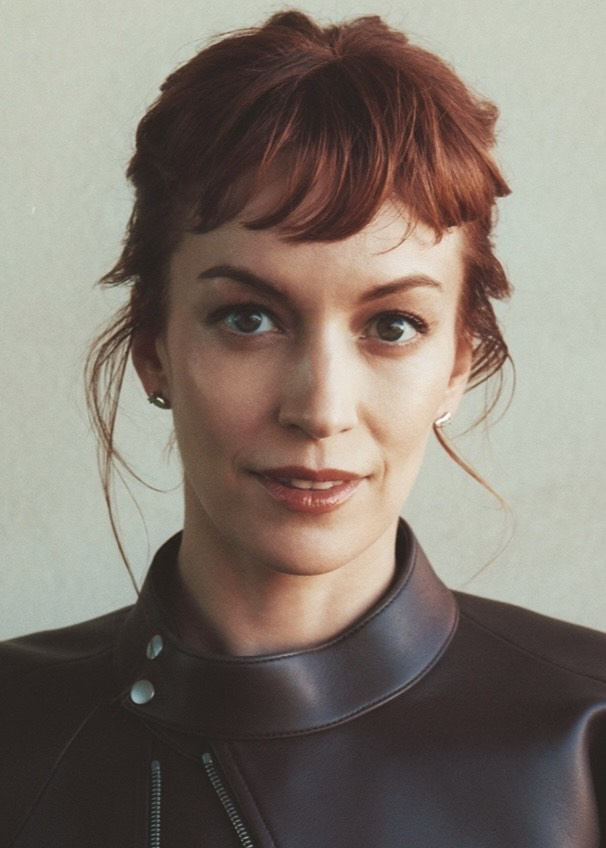
Britt Lower's performance received critical acclaim, and won the Primetime Emmy Award for Outstanding Lead Actress in a Drama Series.

"Attila" received highly positive reviews from critics. Saloni Gajjar of The A.V. Club gave the episode an "A-" and wrote, "Severance is in no mood for straightforward answers. It's making us contemplate the situation from each POV and feel for everyone involved, rightfully opening up important discussions about consent. That said, Helena blatantly flirting with Mark was a hard watch. Girl, get a grip. And that's without Gemma/Ms. Casey fully being in the picture yet. If this feels polarizing now, imagine how tricky it will get once his wife reenters their lives. 'Attila' zeroes in on these complex bonds, letting mysteries simmer on the back burner to chew on the characters' interiorities. But these relationships are, to be sure, going to blow the hell up. We all know it's coming."

Alan Sepinwall of Rolling Stone wrote, "Gaps begin to develop in his own chronology, so that Ms. Huang is tending to Innie Mark's bloody nose at what seems to be the exact same moment that Reghabi is treating Outie Mark, even though he of course can't be in two places at once. But the barriers between the Innie and Outie worlds are being pushed, and at times outright broken. Hearts and souls are not meant to be divided this way. Is it any wonder things are falling apart this way?"

Erin Qualey of Vulture gave the episode a perfect 5 star rating out of 5 and wrote, "It's a huge bummer that none of the love triangles in Severance can end in anything other than sadness and tragedy. This week, we found out that Outie Burt is not only married but also potentially a nefarious Lumon bigwig ... but I totally still want his Innie to end up with Irving B. And, even though Mark is reintegrating, I somehow want him to be with both Helly R. and Gemma at the same time. This is clearly impossible. Severance is setting us up for serious heartbreak, and I’m trying (and failing) to prepare my fragile heart for all of it." Ben Travers of IndieWire gave the episode an "A–" and wrote, "All this time, the work tri-station sits empty. Numbers are not being refined. Cold Harbor remains incomplete. Innies may deserve to experience love, they may have to experience love, but that single five-second shot of an empty MDR office makes one point irrefutably clear: If all this love is allowed to continue, Lumon can't function."

Brady Langman of Esquire wrote, "I'm (nearly) sure that Mark isn't dead. But I don't know how much longer reintegration can go on. Regardless, as we enter episode 7 next week, it feels like we're at an inflection point. If Severance wants to finally deliver some answers, time is running out." Erik Kain of Forbes wrote, "There is something so intensely ominous and creepy about the dinner party Irving attends at Burt's house. I expected it to be awkward, but I didn't expect Burt to be this frightening as an Outie."

Jeff Ewing of Collider wrote, "The episode absolutely leaves us hanging on what happened with Irving's drawing and instructions to the Exports Hall, not to mention Milchick only focusing on the first two criticisms in his performance review. If that's any indication, expect Milchick to come out swinging with a harsher managerial style next week." Breeze Riley of Telltale TV gave the episode a 4 star rating out of 5 and wrote, "Severance has bitten off a lot this season instead of answering important questions. For example, where the hell did Ms. Cobel go? There's still plenty of time to make its case though."
