= Trojan's Horse =

- Severance episode
- Ms. Huang welcomes Helly back at Lumon.
- Episode no.: Season 2 Episode 5
- Directed by: Sam Donovan
- Written by: Megan Ritchie
- Cinematography by: Suzie Lavelle
- Editing by: Keith Fraase
- Original release date: February 13, 2025 (Note: The episode was promoted with the global release date of February 14, but released in American time zones on the preceding evening.)
- Running time: 46 minutes

Guest appearances
- Ólafur Darri Ólafsson as Mr. Drummond; Robby Benson as Dr. Mauer; Karen Aldridge as Asal Reghabi; Sydney Cole Alexander as Natalie Kalen; Claudia Robinson as Felicia; Rachel Addington as Elizabeth

Episode chronology
← Previous "Woe's Hollow"	Next → "Attila"

"Trojan's Horse" is the fifth episode of the second season of the American science fiction psychological thriller television series Severance. It is the 14th overall episode of the series and was written by Megan Ritchie, and directed by executive producer Sam Donovan. It was released on Apple TV+ on February 13, 2025.

The series follows employees of Lumon Industries, a biotechnology corporation that uses a medical procedure called "severance" to separate the memories of their employees: at work, Lumon employees, called "innies", can't remember anything outside of work. Outside work, Lumon employees, called "outies", can't remember anything about work. As a result, innies and outies experience two different lives, with distinct personalities and agendas. In the episode, Helena reluctantly returns to the severed floor, while Milchick gets a performance review. Meanwhile, the MDR team demand a funeral for Irving.

The episode received positive reviews from critics, who praised the performances (particularly Britt Lower's), character development, and writing.

== Plot ==
A man (Robby Benson) wheels a cart through the hallways of Lumon. He arrives at O&D to pick up a tray of dental tools from Felicia (Claudia Robinson) and Elizabeth (Rachel Addington). He takes them down the exports hall and enters the elevator, going downward.

Following the disastrous ORTBO, (Note: As depicted in "Woe's Hollow") a reluctant Helena (Britt Lower) is compelled to continue working on the severed floor as her innie until Mark (Adam Scott) completes the Cold Harbor file. Helly reawakens on the severed floor, confused and outraged that her outie assumed her identity. After Milchick (Tramell Tillman) confirms for the MDR team that Irving (John Turturro) has been permanently fired, Dylan (Zach Cherry) demands a funeral for Irving's innie; Milchick complies, ignoring Miss Huang's (Sarah Bock) concerns that a funeral humanizes the innies. Angered by Mark's dismissive attitude about Irving's loss, Dylan tells Helly that Mark's outie's wife is Ms. Casey (Dichen Lachman). Helly confronts Mark, who confesses he has lost heart now that Helena has told management about his attempts to find Ms. Casey. She passionately argues that she is not Helena and chastises him for taking his frustrations out on the team.

Alone in the break room, Dylan realizes that Irving's final words to him ("hang in there") reference a poster on the wall; behind it, he discovers a card with directions to the exports hall but places it back to avoid suspicion. Meanwhile, Milchick undergoes his first performance review as department head. Beforehand, he attempts to commiserate with Natalie (Sydney Cole Alexander) over his discomfort at the gifted paintings of Kier and their status as minority employees, (Note: As seen in "Who Is Alive?".) but she does not engage. After addressing complaints about minor infractions such as using "too many big words," Mr. Drummond (Ólafur Darri Ólafsson) harshly criticizes Milchick's failed kindness reforms and bungling of the ORTBO, demanding that the innies be treated "as what they really are." Milchick later corners Mark in the elevator, revealing he knows that Mark and Helena had sex during the retreat.

That night, Devon (Jen Tullock) reads the initial draft of Ricken's (Michael Chernus) Lumon edition of The You You Are and expresses dismay at its propagandist tone, which contradicts his original message. Ricken argues that the recognition and financial gain Lumon offers is too great to be ignored. Meanwhile, Irving's outie, while making a call from a phone booth, notices Burt (Christopher Walken) watching him. Burt admits he has been following Irving since the overtime contingency and infers that they were romantically involved on the severed floor. He invites Irving to dinner the next day with his husband, Fields. Meanwhile, Reghabi (Karen Aldridge), now living in Mark's basement, informs him that Lumon has connections to the morgue and reveals that the cremated remains he possesses are not Gemma's. In a sudden flash to the severed floor, Mark finds himself leaving the break room; upon exiting into the hallway, he finally sees Gemma alive, dressed as Ms. Casey and reciting facts about his outie. Shocked, he begins to tear up.

== Production ==
=== Development ===
The episode was written by Megan Ritchie, and directed by executive producer Sam Donovan. This marked Ritchie's first writing credit, and Donovan's second directing credit.

=== Writing ===
On Mark's role in the episode, Dan Erickson explained, "I think we all agree that the healthiest thing for Mark would be to be whole again. He wants to make peace between these different versions of himself and be able to live as a whole person. But, the closer he gets to that catharsis, the more dangerous he becomes to Lumon and, therefore, the more danger he is in, because they don't want them to be whole."

=== Filming ===
For Innie Irving's funeral, a watermelon based on Irving's face is seen. According to Erickson, the watermelon is based on many corporate jobs he had, "the watermelon spread was a common trope. It would be brought in, and oftentimes it was the worst kinds of melon that nobody likes: the green ones that [taste like] you're eating air, basically." As the writers discussed ideas for the funeral, Erickson said that "we wanted to do it in the language that we'd used before, and I was vaguely aware that melon sculpting was a thing."

The watermelon was sculpted by Penko Platikanov and was made out of lacquered foam after real watermelon proved too mushy for the facial details. About 15 ear-shaped pieces of actual watermelon were sculpted for Dylan G. to eat.

== Reception ==
=== Critical reception ===
"Trojan's Horse" received mostly positive reviews from critics. Saloni Gajjar of The A.V. Club gave the episode a "B+" and wrote, "Grappling with loss is all over Severance's latest episode. Everyone experiences it in different gradations but some form of it persists. It's a reminder of how well the show uses a universally relatable feeling to study its characters and make its creepy sci-fi scenarios feel grounded. Yes, thrilling moments like the season-one finale, Irving drowning Helena, or Helly R.'s rebellions crank up the momentum. But Severance shines when it slows down to make its protagonists reflect — which, to be fair, happens fairly often. So 'Trojan's Horse' is a breather after the last few installments."

Alan Sepinwall of Rolling Stone wrote, "That is more or less how 'Trojan's Horse' works as a whole. It has a very difficult task in both following up all the huge events of 'Woe's Hollow,' and in living up to the spell cast by that episode. It is also attempting to juggle Innie and Outie stories, for only the second time this season, after three of the first four episodes focused on only one side or the other. Parts of this one work incredibly well, while others feel rushed." Ben Travers of IndieWire gave the episode a "B+" and wrote, "Lower's hyper-focused performance contributes plenty of conviction all by itself, ensuring that last week's twist feels both real and complete. Things are back to normal ... at least, they should be."

Erin Qualey of Vulture gave the episode a 4 star rating out of 5 and wrote, "After the emotionally charged events of 'Woe's Hollow,' 'Trojan's Horse' marks the halfway point of the season by returning us to the halls of Lumon and delivering a piece-moving episode that includes a lot of exposition and setup for potential payoffs later in the season." Sean T. Collins of Decider wrote, "All the while, Mark is hearing snippets of Miss Casey telling him about his Outie's life, until finally she appears before him, speaking directly to him before he glitches back out. Now Mark, the Outie Mark, knows for certain his wife is alive down there. 'Alive,' anyway."

Brady Langman of Esquire wrote, "This episode, titled 'Trojan's Horse,' is relatively uneventful by Severance's standards, but that doesn't mean the Apple TV+ series didn't give us a few more questions to chew on. And considering that Mark's mysterious and important work on Cold Harbor is nearly finished — the file is 85 percent complete by the end of the episode, to be exact — it sounds like Severance is actually prepared to give us answers by the end of the season." Erik Kain of Forbes wrote, "The hall flickers between his townhouse and the cold, fluorescent halls of Lumon. Then there she is, staring right at him, the wife he thought was dead. Adam Scott's acting here is truly outstanding, as Mark stares into his wife's face, the face of someone he loves but who is clearly a complete stranger all at the same time. It's heartbreaking."

Jeff Ewing of Collider wrote, "The key theme of this episode is tension: Helly and Mark are at odds, Seth Milchick seems to be ill-at-ease with Lumon but commits to being harder on the MDR team, and Devon doesn't approve of Ricken's propaganda. On the other hand, Dylan has discovered Irving's map to reach the Exports Hall, Irving now has a dinner date with Burt and his husband, and Mark's reintegration has given him a glimpse of the one person he's been searching for the truth about." Breeze Riley of Telltale TV gave the episode a 3.5 star rating out of 5 and wrote, "Although the episode isn't the strongest of the season, the tension is enough to keep the narrative yarn from unraveling."

=== Accolades ===
TVLine named Britt Lower as an honorable mention for the "Performer of the Week" for the week of February 15, 2025, for her performance in the episode. The site wrote, "Severance's Helly couldn't be more different from her Outie alter ego Helena, but Britt Lower managed to convincingly inhabit both of them this week. First, she just about chilled our blood as Helena refused to go back inside Lumon, calling the Innies "fucking animals." Then her confusion was heartbreaking when Helly finally reunited with her Lumon friends, only to have them not trust her at all. She pleaded with Mark to believe that she's really her again — and also told him to “stop being a fucking asshole,” which was totally Helly of her. In Lower's hands, Helly and Helena really feel like they're played by two different actors, and that's the ultimate compliment we can pay to her Season 2 performance."
