= Woe's Hollow =

- Severance episode
- The MDR team attending an Outdoor Retreat Team Building Occurrence (ORTBO)
- Episode no.: Season 2 Episode 4
- Directed by: Ben Stiller
- Written by: Anna Ouyang Moench
- Cinematography by: Jessica Lee Gagné
- Editing by: Geoffrey Richman
- Original release date: February 6, 2025 (Note: The episode was promoted with the global release date of February 7, but released in American time zones on the preceding evening.)
- Running time: 50 minutes

Guest appearances
- Adam Jepsen as Shadow Mark; Mishay Petronelli as Shadow Helly; Matthew LaBanca as Shadow Irving; Quentin Avery Brown as Shadow Dylan; Faith Vaughn as Woe; Marc Geller as Kier Eagan (voice)

Episode chronology
← Previous "Who Is Alive?"	Next → "Trojan's Horse"

"Woe's Hollow" is the fourth episode of the second season of the American science fiction psychological thriller television series Severance. It is the 13th overall episode of the series and was written by supervising producer Anna Ouyang Moench and directed by executive producer Ben Stiller. It was released on Apple TV+ on February 6, 2025.

The series follows employees of Lumon Industries, a biotechnology corporation that uses a medical procedure called "severance" to separate the memories of their employees: at work, Lumon employees, called "innies", can't remember anything outside of work. Outside work, Lumon employees, called "outies", can't remember anything about work. As a result, innies and outies experience two different lives, with distinct personalities and agendas. In the episode, the MDR team find themselves on an outdoor retreat at the titular Woe's Hollow.

The episode received widespread critical acclaim, with critics praising the episode's uniqueness, performances (particularly by John Turturro and Britt Lower), direction, and climax. Turturro submitted the episode to support his Emmy nomination for Outstanding Supporting Actor in a Drama Series.

== Plot ==
The MDR team awakens outdoors in the snowy wilderness. They find a television at the edge of a mountain containing a recorded video of Milchick (Tramell Tillman), who explains they are in the Dieter Eagan National Forest as part of a two-day "Outdoor Retreat and Team-Building Occurrence" (ORTBO) that their outies authorized. The team is told that Lumon founder Kier Eagan wrote a fourth appendix to the Lumon handbook shortly before he died; they are to find the volume inside a grotto known as Scissor Cave, where Kier is said to have first tamed the Four Tempers. (Note: As described in "In Perpetuity", the Four Tempers consist of Woe, Frolic, Dread and Malice, and were believed by Kier to make up every human soul.)

The four traverse the woods in search of Scissor Cave, guided by strange doppelgängers of themselves that appear in the distance. They eventually find the cave with the appendix inside; the text reveals that Kier had a twin brother named Dieter, with whom he lived in the woods. Dylan (Zach Cherry) deduces that the doppelgängers are the innies' own "twins." They find a map in the appendix leading them to an area called Woe's Hollow and realize they are to retrace the Eagan brothers' footsteps.

As the four make their way towards Woe's Hollow, Irving (John Turturro) warns Mark (Adam Scott) not to trust Helly (Britt Lower), finding her story about her whereabouts during the overtime contingency (Note: As seen in "Hello, Ms. Cobel".) to be suspicious, but Mark dismisses his concerns. The group finds the carcass of a seal in a river; Irving suggests eating it, but the others decline. The four eventually reach Woe's Hollow, a waterfall, where Milchick awaits them. He guides them to a campsite that he and Miss Huang (Sarah Bock) have set up for them.

As the four set up their tents, Irving asks Helly where she really was the night of the overtime contingency, but Helly evades his questioning. Milchick gathers the group around the campfire to read another chapter from the appendix, which recounts Dieter's otherworldly death, and Kier subsequently encountering the temper Woe at the waterfall. Helly laughs at the story's implication that Dieter "became the forest" because he masturbated, offending Milchick. After Milchick and Huang leave, Irving again presses Helly about her outie in front of the team, but she retorts that Irving is merely bitter at never being able to see Burt again; Irving storms off.

Mark and Helly have sex in her tent; afterwards, Helly admits to Mark that she was ashamed of who her outie is. Mark briefly hallucinates Gemma's (Dichen Lachman) face flashing over Helly's. Meanwhile, after accidentally extinguishing his torch, Irving falls asleep in the woods and has a frightening dream of finding an MDR cubicle in the forest, where he encounters Burt and the personification of Woe described in the appendix; he sees the numbers on his MDR terminal contort into patterns made of letters spelling out "Eagan".

The next morning, Irving finds Helly by herself at Woe's Hollow, confronting her with his suspicion that she is a mole. To prove this, he yells for Milchick and begins drowning Helly in the water. As Milchick and the others arrive, Irving declares that Helly's outie is an Eagan and has been undercover the entire time since the team's return to MDR. Helena finally relents and orders Milchick to revert her to her innie, calling him by his first name Seth and confirming Irving's suspicions. Milchick radios the request for the "Glasgow block" to be removed, restoring Helena to Helly, who wakes up disoriented. As Dylan apologises to Irving for not believing him earlier, Milchick informs Irving he is to be terminated for the attempted murder of a colleague. He then orders Irving to walk into the forest, and shortly afterward calls for Irving's deactivation, which ends Irving's innie life.

== Production ==
=== Development ===
The episode was written by supervising producer Anna Ouyang Moench and directed by executive producer Ben Stiller. This marked Moench's second writing credit, and Stiller's ninth directing credit.

=== Writing ===
On the scene where Mark has sex with Helena (believing her to be Helly), Dan Erickson explained, "It's a strange thing, because in a way both characters have been used. Mark thought he was with one person when he was actually sort of with a different person. And then for Helly, it's a very troubling thing to know that something like that happened without you mentally being there." Adam Scott gave his own interpretation, "For Mark's Outie, Helena is someone he finds frightening and who is responsible for so much tumult and grief in his life. Yet, I think these two people, one way or another, have a connection of some sort."

Britt Lower was content with the decision to reveal Helena's identity early in the season, "To me, the placement made a lot of sense. I also think Outie Irving's training and experience just lends itself well to his Innie picking up clues about Helena. Hopefully, when Helly R. comes back properly now, it will be to a sense of having missed her. I certainly felt that as an actor. It felt really good to be back in her perspective in a clearer sense after episode four."

John Turturro explained that Irving was always seen as a gentle character, yet he was fascinated by the character's actions in the episode, "There's something that he's kind of bonded now closer to Dylan, and Adam and Britt's characters, and that there's something that he just picks up immediately: the whole group is at risk, and not just him. He takes it further and further. And then once he has that dream, it's the last piece of that puzzle." Zach Cherry considered that Irving's dismissal would be a wake-up call for Dylan, "[It's] this moment that kind of crystallizes everything. He's maybe been kind of ignoring these relationships at the office because he's been in his own world, and this moment jars him back into, 'Oh, yeah, these are the people who I'm here with.'"

=== Filming ===
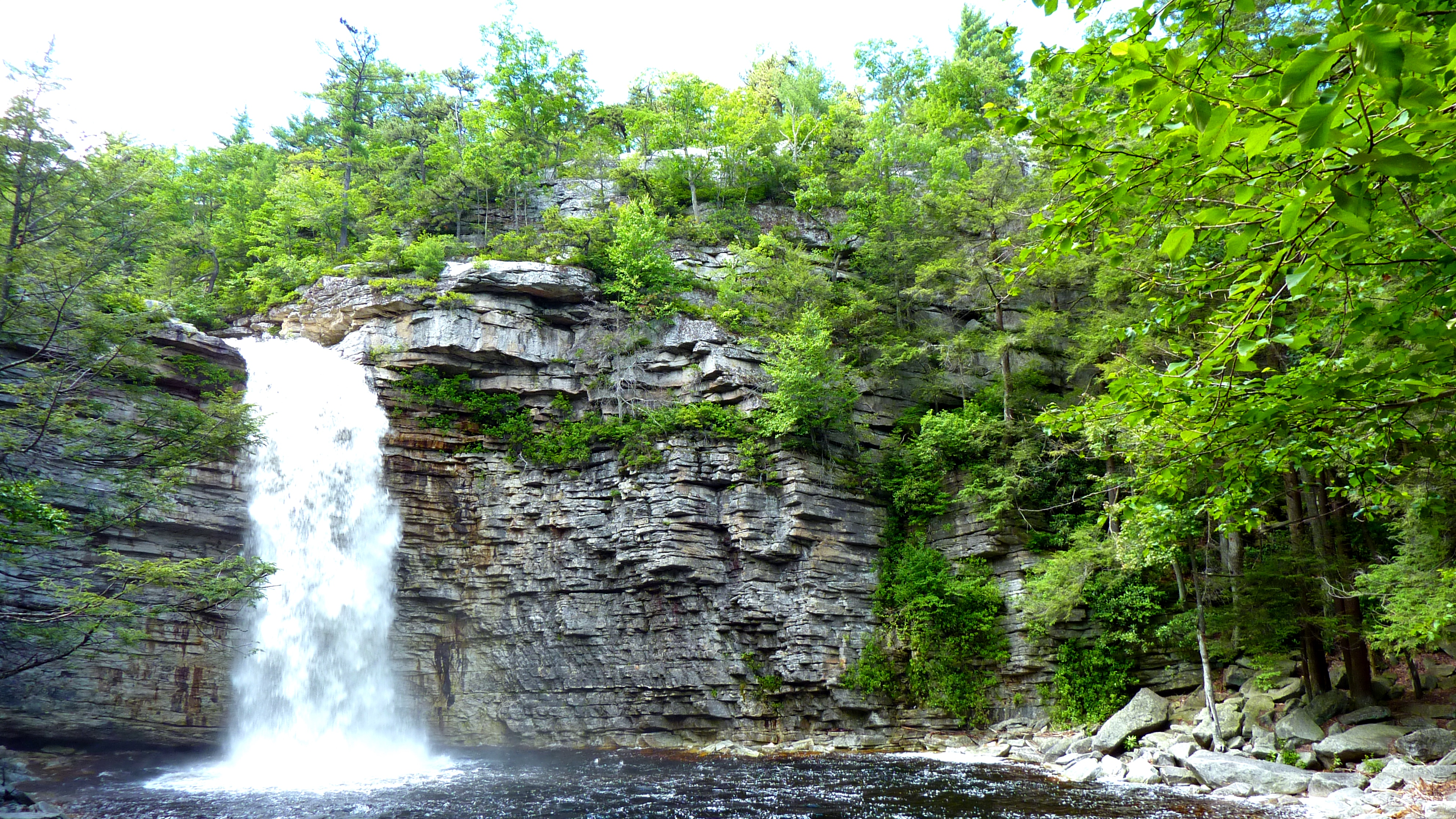
Awosting Falls at Minnewaska State Park where the episode was filmed.

The episode was filmed at Minnewaska State Park Preserve in New York State and features the park's Awosting Falls as the waterfall. Lower estimated that the episode took four or five weeks to film, and due to the amount of daylight scenes required, the crew was "racing against the sun every day."

For the scene where Irving attempts to drown Helena in the lake, Turturro and Lower considered the part difficult, with Turturro stating "you want to do all the emotional stuff and also take care of the other person at the same time and make sure the other person is safe, and you're not hurting them and stuff like that."

== Critical reviews ==
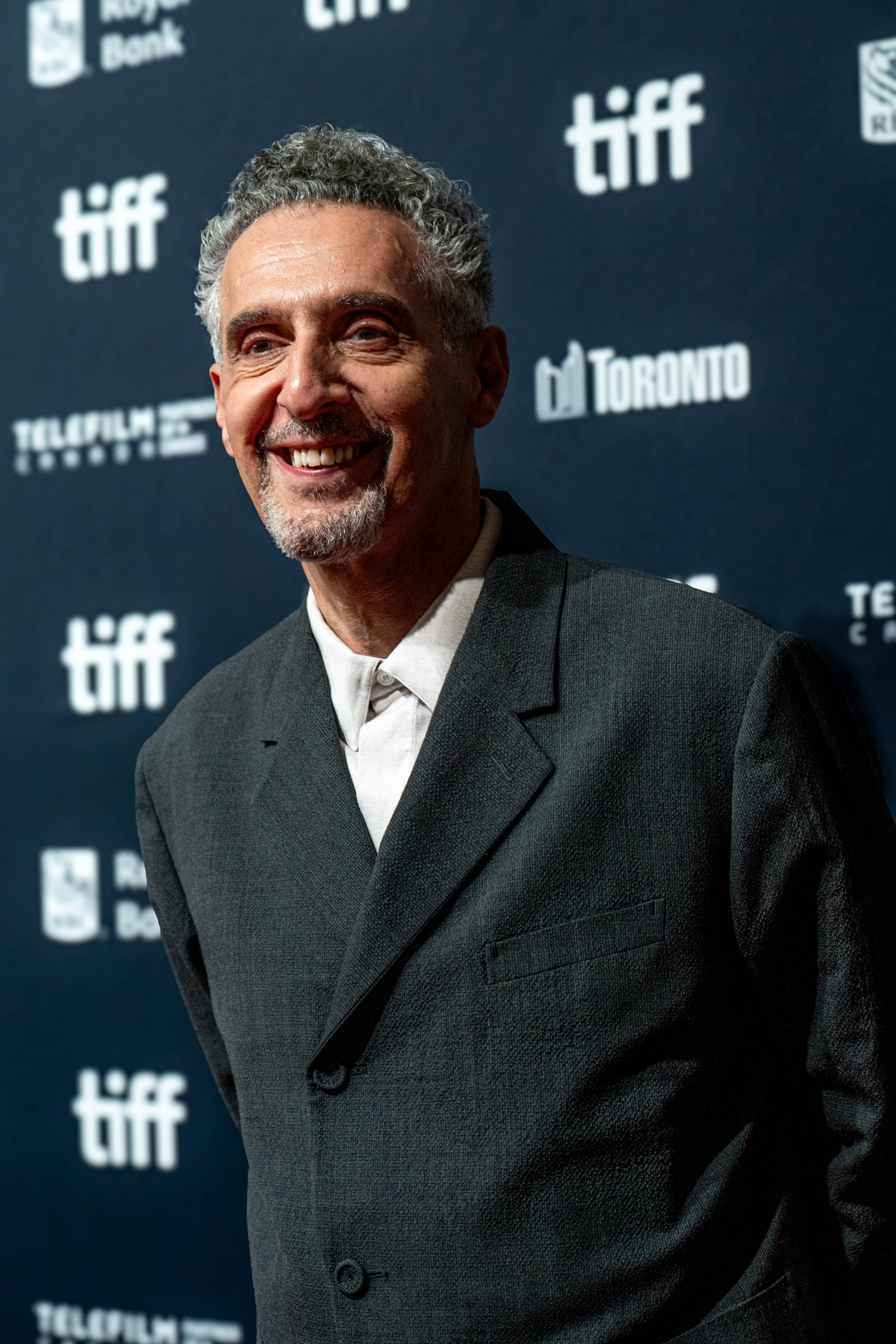
John Turturro's performance garnered widespread critical acclaim, and received an Emmy nomination for Outstanding Supporting Actor in a Drama Series.

"Woe's Hollow" received critical acclaim. Saloni Gajjar of The A.V. Club gave the episode an "A" and wrote, "John Turturro crushes it in these electrifying final few minutes. This had better be the actor's Emmy submission episode (ditto for Britt Lower). Turturro is anxiety-inducing and utterly heartbreaking in pushing Irving to the brink of no return."

Alan Sepinwall of Rolling Stone wrote, "How is Outie Mark doing at the moment? How would he respond to Milchick or someone else from Lumon suggesting that he give up the next few days of his life, right now, to allow Innie Mark to enjoy a field trip? But even my frustration with that was quickly washed away by all the ice and snow, by what is not the tallest waterfall on the planet, and by all the impressive sights, sounds, and plot twists we found in 'Woe's Hollow'." Ben Travers of IndieWire gave the episode an "A–" and wrote, "The suddenness of each massive twist is enough to produce a bit of whiplash: How did we get here? With Helly, the truth has been shrewdly hidden behind a key theme of the episode (and Severance overall): twins. In a show where every severed character essentially forms an identical duo, Season 2 also introduced a number of scenes involving Helly/Helena that, while perhaps curious or notable at the time, now invite two distinct interpretations."

Erin Qualey of Vulture gave the episode a perfect 5 star rating out of 5 and wrote, "'Woe's Hollow' is truly John Turturro's episode. I have watched the last seven minutes of this episode more times than I can count, and it has yet to lose its power. My breath catches, my eyes tear up, my hands fidget, and my heart races. The tension and emotion that the entire Severance team creates in this sequence is right up there with the last few minutes of the season-one finale, but here, it all pivots on Turturro's magnificent performance." Sean T. Collins of Decider wrote, "Shows that try their hand at mystery-box storytelling would do well to follow the example set by Severance in 'Woe's Hollow'. It's much more compelling to let the nuances of performance and writing reveal a character's layers over time, the way they do in a regular drama, than to constantly pull rabbits out of hats like a stage magician."

Brady Langman of Esquire wrote, "MDR has to recover and RTO, because Mark needs to finish Cold Harbor. You have to wonder if Lumon and Helena – knowing that the team will be crushed by Irving's death – will return Helly to the severed floor, if only to keep Mark happy enough to finish Cold Harbor. As for Dylan, I'll never recover from the way he shouted, 'I'm sorry I didn't listen!' to Irving." Erik Kain of Forbes wrote, "I cannot really put into words how momentous all of this was, or how affecting. Ben Stiller once again directed this episode, and it's one of the finest he's done so far."

Jeff Ewing of Collider wrote, "It's a huge reveal that Helena has been masquerading as Helly the entire time. We don't know what will ultimately become of Irving, what that thing in the forest was, what really happened to Dieter (or if he was even real?), what the blowback for Milchick almost getting an Eagan killed will be, or the actual deal with those creepy doubles." Breeze Riley of Telltale TV gave the episode a perfect 5 star rating out of 5 and wrote, "Severance has been firing on all cylinders this season, and been plenty weird, but this is the first episode that feels above and beyond the high bar the show has set for itself creatively."

=== Accolades ===
TVLine named Turturro the "Performer of the Week" for the week of February 8, 2025, for his performance in the episode. The site wrote, "This week's Severance was a true game-changer, with the shocking reveal that Helena had been posing as 'Helly' all season long. (Well, maybe not shocking to the sleuths who guessed it already.) And Turturro upped his game to match, as Irving tumbled into an abyss of bitter paranoia during a grueling outdoor excursion for the Lumon gang – and later proved that his paranoia was justified after all."
