= Level 1 Entertainment =

American film production company

Level 1 Entertainment LLC
- Company type: Movie studio
- Industry: Entertainment
- Founded: January 2003; 23 years ago
- Founder: Bill Todman, Jr. Edward Milstein
- Headquarters: 9150 Wilshire Boulevard, Beverly Hills, California
- Products: Motion pictures
- Website: Level1Ent.com

Level 1 Entertainment LLC is an American film production company. It was founded in January 2003 by film producer Bill Todman, Jr. (the son of game show producer Bill Todman) and real estate and banking magnate Edward Milstein. Paul Schwake joined the company later that year as chief operating officer.

In 2006, Level 1 released their first film, the comedy Grandma's Boy, through 20th Century Fox and in collaboration with Adam Sandler's Happy Madison Productions. They again worked with Happy Madison on the comedy Strange Wilderness, which was released on February 1, 2008.

Level 1 also financed New Line Cinema's Rendition, starring Reese Witherspoon and Jake Gyllenhaal. They were initially a financial partner on Star Trek along with Paramount Pictures and J. J. Abrams' production company, Bad Robot, but were later replaced by Spyglass Entertainment.

== Filmography ==
Release date	Title	Director(s)	Production partners	Distributor(s)	Budget	Box office
January 6, 2006	Grandma's Boy	Nicholaus Goossen	Happy Madison Productions	20th Century Fox	$5 million	$6.6 million
October 19, 2007	Rendition	Gavin Hood	Anonymous Content	New Line Cinema	$27.5 million	$27 million
February 1, 2008	Strange Wilderness	Fred Wolf	Happy Madison Productions	Paramount Pictures	$20 million	$6.9 million
March 23, 2013	Detour	William Dickerson	Fishbowl Films	Gravitas Ventures		
2014	The Grays	Henry Hobson				

== See also ==
- Caravan Pictures
- Spyglass Entertainment
