= Frances Todman =

American philanthropist

- Todman, 1982 by Kim Sargent
- Born: Frances Holmes Burson; July 25, 1926; Jackson County, Georgia, US
- Died: January 23, 2008 (aged 81); New York City, US
- Other names: Fran Todman
- Education: Chevy Chase Junior College; Barmore Junior College
- Occupation: Philanthropist
- Years active: 1978–2000
- Spouse: William Selden Todman (m. 1950; died 1979)
- Children: 2; including Bill Todman Jr.

Frances Holmes Todman (née Burson; July 25, 1926 – January 23, 2008) was an American philanthropist who raised and donated money for numerous educational, charitable, and health organizations. She was affiliated with the Retina Foundation for over 20 years.

== Early life, education, and family ==
Frances Holmes Burson was born on July 25, 1926, in Jackson County, Georgia, to Fanette Lee "Fannie" (née Wood) and Lucius Holmes Burson. Her parents separated shortly after her birth, divorcing in 1932, and Burson grew up in the home of her maternal grandparents, Lutie Pearl (née Simmons, Wood) and William S. Thrasher.

Burson attended Orlando High School, graduating in 1944. She graduated from Chevy Chase Junior College in Chevy Chase, Maryland, in 1946. She went on to study journalism at Barmore Junior College in New York City. During her schooling in New York, she worked for an advertising agency and then did modeling and make-up classes for Richard Hudnut Cosmetics.

On December 17, 1950, at the St. Regis New York, she married William Selden Todman, a television and radio producer of Goodson-Todman Productions. After their marriage, the couple made their home in Westchester County, New York, where they raised two children, William Jr. and Lisa. In 1974, they moved to Palm Springs, Florida, for the winter season.

== Charitable work ==
Todman began her involvement in charitable work when her husband developed a heart condition in the 1970s and she needed a break from tending to him. He died in 1979, aged 62. That same year, she became the chair of the Retina Foundation's annual fundraising gala. Over the years, she served as general chairman, co-chairman, and committee member of the gala. As a member of the board of trustees, she led the entertainment fundraiser for the American Cancer Society's Palm Beach Benefit in 1982.

Todman was involved in numerous charitable activities for the Boys Club of America, the Royal Poinciana Children's Theater, and the Eye Research Institute, among others. In 1984, she donated $1 million (equivalent to $3,026,586 in 2024) to New York University Tisch School of the Arts to establish the William S. and Frances B. Todman Film and Television Center. In 1986, the Schepens Eye Research Institute of Boston named its electrophysiology laboratory in her honor. She remained active in charitable work with the Retina Foundation and the American Heart Association through 2000.

== Death and legacy ==
Todman died on January 23, 2008, in New York City. Her son, Bill Todman Jr., became a film producer.
