= A Most Violent Year (soundtrack) =

A Most Violent Year (Original Music from and Inspired By)

Film score by Alex Ebert
- Released: December 16, 2014
- Recorded: 2014
- Studio: Frenchmen Street, New Orleans, Los Angeles; Ocean Way Recording, Hollywood, California; Studio in the Country, Bogalusa, Los Angeles
- Genre: Film score
- Length: 55:03
- Label: Community Music Group
- Producer: Alex Ebert

Howard Shore chronology
All Is Lost (2013)	A Most Violent Year (2014)	I vs. I (2020)

A Most Violent Year (Original Music from and Inspired By) is the film score to the 2014 film A Most Violent Year directed by J. C. Chandor starring Oscar Isaac and Jessica Chastain. The original score is composed by Edward Sharpe and the Magnetic Zeros frontman Alex Ebert and released through Community Music Group on December 16, 2014.

== Development ==
The film score is composed by Alex Ebert, previously worked with Chandor on the All Is Lost (2013) for which he won the Golden Globe Award for Best Original Score. He read the script of the film, while working on All is Lost and thought of curating a jazz score and having the vibe of New York City not only in the setting, but also in the movies, recalling the period of 1970s films that accompanied jazz and synthesizers that emerged in the 1980s becoming a transitional period for music. Hence, Ebert finalized a jazz-synth infused score that would synthesize "calling-card themes and extended atmospheres".

Ebert noticed on Abel's character being a one-way ambition and having been in a trance, and wanted audience to feel similar within the bubble of his own focus and singularity. The theme he composed for the piece, was reminiscent of Johann Sebastian Bach's Fugue in D Minor, which was like a Dracula theme, as he considered Abel to a "bloodsucker".

The opening scene of the film was difficult to score for Ebert, as he had to try hard to replace Marvin Gaye's "Inner City Blues (Make Me Wanna Holler)" and had worked continuously to replace that piece, by mixing free jazz and big band score. Later, Ebert then fused a hybrid of that song with his jazz and big band score. Initially, he composed an orchestral, triumphant score cue called "Garden Shadows" which was not in the final score, but had two versions: one with a piano and orchestra. The orchestral version was initially recorded first, but Chandor wanted him to scrap that version and replace it with a piano instead.

While writing the music, he had thought of the music composed by Suicide and have incorporated the stuff until he wrote the song "America for Me". The influence of the vintage setting and synth-heavy pop score, had led him to write that song, for which he used a damaged beat machine and some blips. The "spiky" tone which coming throughout was a 2-pop that heard at the beginning and end of a film, that he sampled into the song. Throughout the composition, he had collected "mental music" notes as he was influenced by Miami Vice and Scarface, the latter having a synth-heavy soundtrack.

Ebert wrote the score at his home in New Orleans, while the recording happened there, and parts in Los Angeles and Bulgaria, with the sessions happened for two months. Ebert closely worked with an orchestrator Brian Byrne for the recording and scoring process. In a later interview, he considered working on the film's music to be quite enjoyable.

== Release ==
The soundtrack was released on December 16, 2014, through Community Music Group.

== Reception ==
Mark Kermode of The Guardian wrote "An angsty synth-inflected score from Alex Ebert, who cites synthpunk band Suicide as a tonal touchstone, evokes the period milieu without recourse to plastic pastiche". Dana Stevens of Slate "Alex Ebert's music [...] lovingly evokes a lost era of film scoring when heroes came complete with their own pensive, melodic themes." A. O. Scott of The New York Times called it an "anxious musical score". Joshua Rothkopf of Time Out wrote "Alex Ebert's synth score doesn't help". Chris Fyvie of The Skinny called it an "unsettling, organ-led score". Nathan Bartlebaugh of The Film Stage wrote "Melding the acting and the visuals is a wild, restless score by Alex Ebert that reconciles the film's competing identities well."

== Track listing ==
No.	Title	Length
1.	"America For Me"	4:11
2.	"I Am and We Are"	3:12
3.	"Garden Shadows" (Piano)	2:31
4.	"Random Piece"	2:04
5.	"Abel's Theme"	3:03
6.	"Running"	2:43
7.	"Underneath"	1:44
8.	"Close Haircut"	7:37
9.	"Garden Shadows" (Orchestra)	2:54
Total length:		29:59

== Personnel ==
Credits adapted from liner notes:

- Music composer, producer, recording, mixing: Alex Ebert
- Mastering: Reuben Cohen
- Assistant engineer: Jay Wesley, Matt Linesch
- Orchestrator: Brian Byrne

== Accolades ==
Award / Association / Film festival	Date of ceremony	Category	Recipient(s)	Result	Ref.
World Soundtrack Awards	October 24, 2015	Discovery of the Year	Ben Salisbury and Geoff Barrow	Nominated	
