= VHS or Beta =

American rock band

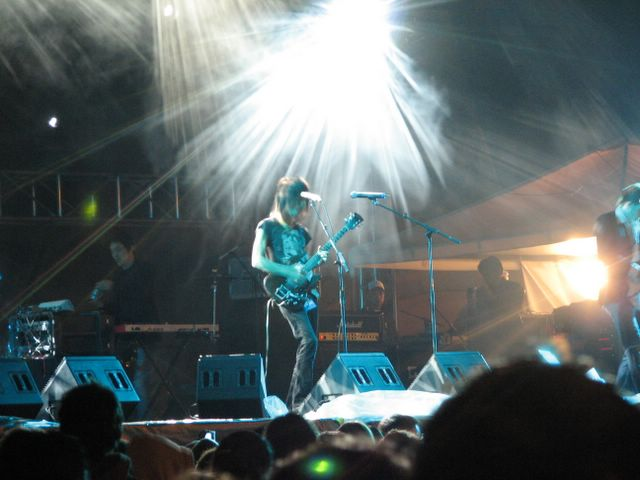
- VHS or Beta performing live at Rock al parque in Bogotá, Colombia, 2005

Background information
- Origin: Louisville, Kentucky, USA
- Genres: Dance-punk; new rave; alternative dance
- Years active: 1997–2014, 2024
- Label: Astralwerks
- Past members: Craig Pfunder; Mark Palgy; Zeke Buck; Jerome Miller; Mark Guidry; Mike McGill; Chea Beckley; Jason Clark; Jim Orso
- Website: www.vhsorbeta.com

VHS or Beta was an American rock band originally from Louisville, Kentucky, later based in Brooklyn, New York, that combined elements of rock, house and disco. The band took their name from the videotape format war of the 1970s and 1980s, where Sony's Beta format competed with JVC's VHS.

== Overview ==
VHS Or Beta was founded by core members Craig Pfunder (lead vocals, guitar) and Mark Palgy (bass), as well as guitarist Zeke Buck and drummer Mark Guidry. Buck and Guidry left the band in 2006 and 2010, respectively. Guitarists Mike McGill and Eric Rodgers, keyboardists Chea Beckley and Jerome Miller, and drummers Jim Orso and Chris Berry have all toured and/or recorded with the band. Prior to VHS Or Beta, Palgy and Pfunder were in a band Raze with former Elliott and current Wax Fang drummer Kevin Ratterman in the early 1990s.

Following the release of their self-released debut EP Le Funk in 2002, the band released their debut album Night on Fire in 2004. In 2005, VHS or Beta opened for Duran Duran on a leg of the latter's 2005 North American tour. After two and half years of touring, VHS or Beta recorded 2007's Bring on the Comets in Asheville, North Carolina, marking a slight change in direction towards a more straightforward pop sound.

Later singles "Feel It When You Know" (2009) and "All Summer in a Day" (2010) were issued on their own Chromosome Records label. The band's third album Diamonds and Death was released in September 2011 by Krian Music Group, followed by a dub version of the album in 2012.

The band became inactive around 2014, despite Pfunder promising that a fourth album was being written. The band was briefly reformed in 2024 for a one-off show, in which they played Night on Fire in its entirety to celebrate its 20th anniversary.

== In popular culture ==
The band's song "Night on Fire" was featured in Grandma's Boy and on The O.C., in addition to Mack Dawg Production's 2006 Follow Me Around. It was also used as part of the soundtrack for the videogame MLB 06: The Show. "Burn It All Down" was featured on the soundtrack for the 2009 documentary The September Issue.

== Discography ==
=== Studio albums ===
- Night on Fire (2004, Astralwerks)
- Bring on the Comets (2007, Astralwerks)
- Diamonds and Death (2011, Krian Music Group)
- Diamonds and Dub (2012, Krian Music Group)

=== Singles and EPs ===
- On and On EP (1998, Nasty Skrump)
- Le Funk EP (2002, ON! Records)
- "Solid Gold" (2003, Startime Intl Fader Label Enterprises)
- "Night on Fire" (2004, Astralwerks)
- "The Melting Moon" (2005, Astralwerks)
- "You Got Me" (2006, Astralwerks)
- "Can't Believe a Single Word" (2007, Astralwerks)
- "Burn It All Down" (2007, Astralwerks)
- "Feel It When You Know" (2009, Chromosome Records)
- "All Summer in a Day" (2010, Chromosome Records)
- "Breaking Bones" (2011, Krian Music Group)
- "I Found a Reason" (2011, Krian Music Group)
- Eyes (The Serge Devant Mixes) EP (2012, Krian Music Group)

== Videography ==
- "Messages" (1999)
- "You Got Me" (2005) - Directed by Ryan Rickett; Giant Drag's Annie Hardy and Ima Robot's Alex Ebert both appear in the video
- "Night on Fire" (2005) - Directed by Ben Dickinson
- "Can't Believe a Single Word" (2007) - Directed by Greg Foley
- "Breaking Bones" (2011) - Directed by Graham Hill
