= Hell and Back (film) =

- Theatrical release poster
- Directed by: Tom Gianas; Ross Shuman
- Written by: Tom Gianas; Hugh Sterbakov; Zeb Wells
- Produced by: Eric Blyler; Alexander Bulkley; Corey Campodonico
- Starring: Nick Swardson; Mila Kunis; Bob Odenkirk; T.J. Miller; Rob Riggle; Susan Sarandon; Danny McBride
- Cinematography: Eric Adkins
- Edited by: Matt Mariska
- Music by: Ryan Franks; Scott Nickoley
- Production company: ShadowMachine
- Distributed by: Freestyle Releasing
- Release date: October 2, 2015
- Running time: 84 minutes
- Country: United States
- Language: English
- Box office: $157,768

Hell and Back is a 2015 American stop motion adult animated fantasy black comedy film directed by Tom Gianas and Ross Shuman and written by Gianas, Hugh Sterbakov, and Zeb Wells. It stars the voices of Nick Swardson, Mila Kunis, Bob Odenkirk, T.J. Miller, Rob Riggle, Susan Sarandon, and Danny McBride. It follows three friends who break a blood oath over a mint, causing a portal to open and suck one of them into Hell. The other two go through the portal to save him from demons and the Devil himself. The film was released October 2, 2015, by Freestyle Releasing.

== Plot ==
Carnival barker Remy needs to bring in business at a rundown pier carnival alongside his childhood friends, carnival repairman Augie and assistant manager Curt. After Curt reveals the bank has foreclosed the carnival, Remy borrows a book of spells from fortune-teller Madame Zonar.

Remy displays the book at The Gates of Hell attraction. When Curt asks Remy for a mint, Remy forces Curt to take a blood oath on the book to pay Remy back a mint. Curt is sucked into a portal within the ride. Remy and Augie take a car from the ride into the portal to rescue Curt, only to find themselves in Hell.

Remy and Augie are taken to the Devil, who says he intends to torture them. He mentions the Greek legend Orpheus and his reputation for bringing mortals out of Hell. He forces the duo to hide when visited by an angel named Barb, with whom he is infatuated. When Barb mentions that she is aware of the mortals in his domain, the Devil tries to win her graces by handing them over, but they have escaped. Female demon Deema agrees to take Remy and Augie to Curt if they take her to Orpheus, using the Devil's cell phone, which they had stolen. Curt meets the Devil and learns he is to be sacrificed for not keeping his blood oath. He persuades the Devil to spare him if he puts on a show to win Barb's favor with a replacement sacrifice.

Remy, Augie, and Deema use a submarine to find Orpheus – an eccentric slacker, retired from saving mortals while having one-night stands with numerous women. Deema reveals herself to be his daughter via a fling with Durmessa. Deema and Augie leave. After sharing a romantic moment on Charon's ferry, they discover from the Devil's cellphone that Curt is to be sacrificed at the crossroads and go to save him. Remy locates Curt via Orpheus's TV and uses a purgatory boat to catch up with his friends.

As no replacement could be found, the Devil prepares to sacrifice Curt. While the Devil uses the bathroom, Remy, Augie, and Deema reunite with Curt but are ambushed by the Devil and his minions.

Orpheus attempts to rescue them disguised as a demon, but is also captured. Barb arrives via a stripper's pole and is attracted to Orpheus. The Devil tries to use a T-shirt cannon to kill Orpheus, accidentally knocking the group into the lower regions of hell full of sex-offender trees, including one that raped Orpheus as a child. Seeing the tree is regretful, Orpheus grants it forgiveness if it helps out.

Remy, Augie, Curt, and Deema are caught by the trees. Curt drops a mint onto Remy, allowing them to return to the mortal realm, leaving the Devil to be raped by the trees.

Remy's idea to keep the park open succeeded, and the group renovate the park to include attractions based on their experience in Hell, along with an attraction called the "Gates of Heaven" featuring Orpheus and Barb.

== Cast ==
- Nick Swardson as Remington "Remy"
- Mila Kunis as Deema
- Bob Odenkirk as The Devil
- T.J. Miller as Augie
- Rob Riggle as Curt Myers
- Susan Sarandon as Barb the Angel
- Danny McBride as Orpheus
- Maria Bamford as Gloria
- Lance Bass as Boy Band Demon
- H. Jon Benjamin as Sex Offender Tree
- Jennifer Coolidge as Durmessa
- John P. Farley as Welcome to Hell Demon
- Jenna Gianas as Hell Announcer
- Dennis Gubbins as Larry the Demon
- Jay Johnston as Rick the Lost Soul
- Kerri Kenney-Silver as Madame Zonar
- Kyle Kinane as Kyle the Demon
- David Koechner as Asmodeus
- Seth Morris as Atheist Lost Soul
- Kumail Nanjiani as Dave the Demon
- Michael Peña as Abigor
- Brian Posehn as Cleb the Carny
- Greg Proops as Asmoday
- Paul Scheer as Head Demon
- J.B. Smoove as Sal the Demon
- Dana Snyder as Garthog
- Paul F. Tompkins as Annoyed Lost Soul
- Nakia Trower as Carnival Patron

== Release ==
In May 2015, Freestyle Releasing acquired distribution rights to the film and set the film for a September 25, 2015 release. However, it was pushed back to October 2, 2015.

== Reception ==
=== Box office ===
Hell and Back opened theatrically on October 2, 2015, in 411 venues, earning $104,374 in its opening weekend, ranking number 33 in the domestic box office. As of October 15, the film grossed $157,768.

=== Critical reception ===
Bloody Disgusting, a subsidiary of CraveOnline, gave a negative review by criticizing the humor (particularly the drawn-out running gag regarding male rape), but praising the stop-motion animation.

== See also ==
- Robot Chicken
