= Monument to the Masses =

Studio album by Ima Robot
- Released: September 12, 2006
- Genre: Dance-punk, power pop, garage rock revival
- Length: 42:52
- Label: Virgin
- Producer: David Bendeth, Junior Sanchez, Ima Robot

Ima Robot chronology
Ima Robot (2004)	Monument to the Masses (2006)	Another Man's Treasure (2010)

Professional ratings
Review scores
Source	Rating
Allmusic	3/5 stars

Monument to the Masses is the second album by Ima Robot. It was released by Virgin Records in 2006.

== Track listing ==
All tracks written by Alex Ebert.

1. "Disconnect" - 03:31
2. "Creeps Me Out" - 03:03
3. "Cool, Cool Universe" - 03:15
4. "The Beat" - 03:37
5. "Eskimo Ride" - 02:59
6. "Chip Off the Block" - 04:41
7. "Happy Annie" - 04:11
8. "Pouring Pain" - 03:27
9. "Stick It to the Man" - 03:02
10. "What Comes Tomorrow?" - 02:36
11. "Lovers in Captivity" - 05:04
12. "Dangerous Life" - 03:28
