= Nicholaus Goossen =

American film director

- Born: Nicholaus Edward Goossen; August 18, 1978 (age 47); Los Angeles, California, U.S.
- Occupation(s): Film director, photographer

Nicholaus Edward Goossen (born August 18, 1978) is a film director and photographer.

== Life and career ==
Goossen's first feature film was Grandma's Boy for Happy Madison Productions and 20th Century Fox. He collaborated with Adam Sandler (executive producer of Grandma's Boy) on the album Shhh... Don't Tell as a writer and co-producer in addition to performing on the track "Gay Robot."

Goossen directed the music video for the album's first single "Secret." It features Adam Sandler and comedian Nick Swardson (co-writer and co-star of Grandma's Boy) singing about the benefits of having trimmed pubic hair.

Goossen's previous credits include the short film A Day with the Meatball, which once again featured Sandler but focused primarily on his bulldog Meatball. The two-minute piece showcases the dog meandering around various places until he ends up back in his master's arms. It was shown in theaters around the United States in 2002 as an attachment to Sandler's animated film Eight Crazy Nights.

Goossen helped create Sandler's official website and directed several short films for the site.

Goossen directed the 2009 horror film The Shortcut in Saskatchewan, Canada. The film tells the story of two brothers who learn first hand about an urban legend surrounding a shortcut near their school.

Goossen was the director of a 2010 Times Square interactive billboard installation for retailer Forever 21 which was developed by space150; the installation received media coverage for being "a clever, fresh project," but later, coverage focused on its similarities to Chris O'Shea's 2009 project in Liverpool.

Goossen co-directed the 2015 video to the song "Human Sadness" by the American rock band Julian Casablancas + The Voidz.

Goossen directed the 2015 comedy specials Trevor Moore: High in Church and Nick Swardson: Taste It.

Goossen co-wrote, directed and edited the 2024 film Drugstore June.
