= All Is Lost (soundtrack) =

All Is Lost (Original Motion Picture Soundtrack)

Film score by Alex Ebert
- Released: October 1, 2013
- Recorded: 2013
- Studio: Adios, Ojai; Lurssen Mastering, Los Angeles
- Genre: Film score
- Length: 45:17
- Label: Community Music Group
- Producer: Alex Ebert

Alex Ebert chronology
Alexander (2011)	All Is Lost (2013)	A Most Violent Year (2014)

Singles from All Is Lost (Original Motion Picture Soundtrack)
- 1. "Amen" Released: September 12, 2013

All Is Lost (Original Motion Picture Soundtrack) is the soundtrack album to the 2013 film All Is Lost directed by J. C. Chandor. The film's original score is composed by Edward Sharpe and the Magnetic Zeros' frontman Alex Ebert and was released through Community Music Group on October 1, 2013. Ebert's score was critically acclaimed and received a Golden Globe Award for Best Original Score.

== Development ==
All Is Lost marked Ebert's maiden feature film scoring assignment. Chandor discussed with Ebert's manager Amos Newman to listen the works of few "out of the box" musicians where Ebert was one of the list. After listening to his work, Chandor had a formal interaction with Ebert who agreed his role in the film during November 2012. At certain instances, Ebert wrote the music without watching the film and eventually worked well, while the melodic themes were recorded to picture; some of his pre-written material would change dramatically when played to picture. The first scene he scored was the climatic sequence where he described it as "very beautiful, the death of it so overwhelmingly liberating, that nothing short of something that felt sacred would do." It applied to the drone music, which accompanied of Tibetan bowls and giant crystal bowls providing the sonorous hum.

The main theme "Excelsior" was the first piece of music he wrote for the film, which was originally in ¾ time at about five times the pace of the music; he called it as "a perky waltz that suddenly turned into a very different, brooding piece when playing it to the movie". The aim was to create the fourth wall, with the chorus calling Redford's character to surrender. The alto flute deciphered "the wild, solipsistic union with the elements and of the strange and cold beauty of surrender" that played imperceptibly as the wind and the character is even challenged despite paying no heed. When Redford accepts defeat, the flute plays as he writes the last letter and the theme never played again, implying that he has surrendered.

Besides composing the score, Ebert wrote and produced the original song "Amen". He did not plan for writing a song, but he had something in mind which had the potential to describe the story where the refrain that kept coming was "Amen", the character's name was phonetically close to the word. For the lyrics, he overtly incorporated his thoughts about Redford, the generation and living in the face of death and used few direct references of the character. Ebert added that the song in its entirety is a conversation between the woeful young and the defiant old.

== Release ==
On September 10, 2013, Community Music Group announced the film's soundtrack that consisted of 11 tracks along with an original song "Amen". The latter was released as a single on September 12, 2013, while the album in its entirety was released on October 1.

== Reception ==
=== Critical reception ===
Writing for The Independent, Geoffrey Macnab said that "music is used sparingly but to great effect." Ben Kenigsberg of RogerEbert.com wrote "The score by Alex Ebert [...] is the film's main concession to commercial interests" Justin Chang of Variety summarized that Ebert's score "crucially serves the material with its enveloping, never overpowering swells of emotion". Todd McCarthy of The Hollywood Reporter wrote "The score by Alex Ebert is quite varied, both in sound and effectiveness." Dana Stevens of Slate wrote "The musical theme—a simple, haunting melody by Alex Ebert—is used sparingly and effectively, with natural sound providing most of the sonic backdrop." Philippa Hawker of The Sydney Morning Herald wrote that the film "combines a complex sound design with a sparingly employed score from Alex Ebert".

=== Year-end lists ===
- 1st – The Playlist Staff, IndieWire
- 3rd – Melissa Thompson and Michelle McCue, We Are Movie Geeks
- 4th – Jon Burlingame and Steve Chagollan, Variety
- 6th – MTV
- Ivan Radford, Den of Geek (honourable mention)

== Track listing ==
All Is Lost (Original Motion Picture Soundtrack) track listing
No.	Title	Length
1.	"Excelsior"	2:55
2.	"All Is Lost"	4:30
3.	"Virginia's Dream"	2:39
4.	"The Infinite Bleed"	8:32
5.	"The Invisible Man"	5:54
6.	"Pulse of the Weight"	1:50
7.	"Dance of the Lilies"	5:19
8.	"The Instincts of Boredom"	3:27
9.	"Somewhere in the Midnight of Summer"	3:33
10.	"Excelsior and the All Day Man"	2:00
11.	"Amen"	4:38
Total length:		45:17

== Accolades ==
Accolades for All Is Lost (Original Motion Picture Soundtrack)
Award	Date of ceremony	Category	Recipient(s)	Result	Ref(s)
Golden Globe Awards	January 12, 2014	Best Original Score	Alex Ebert	Won	
International Cinephile Society	January 14, 2014	Best Original Score	Alex Ebert	Nominated	
World Soundtrack Awards	August 14, 2014	Best Original Score of the Year	Alex Ebert	Nominated	
World Soundtrack Awards	August 14, 2014	Best Original Song Written Directly for a Film	Alex Ebert — ("Amen")	Nominated	
