= Peter Dante =

American actor (born 1968)

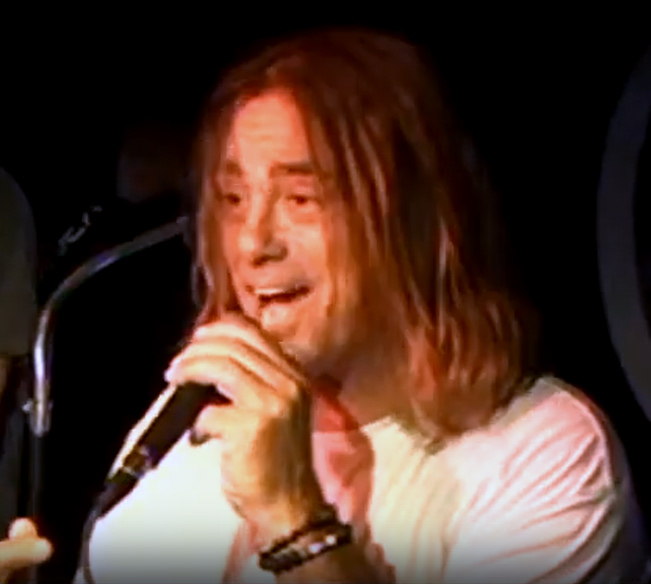
- Dante in 2019
- Born: Peter Francis Dante; December 16, 1968 (age 57); West Hartford, Connecticut, U.S.
- Occupations: Actor; comedian; singer
- Years active: 1994–present
- Children: 2

Peter Francis Dante (born December 16, 1968) is an American character actor, comedian and singer. He appeared in sixteen films from Happy Madison Productions, often alongside Adam Sandler, until his controversial arrest led to the pair separating.

== Career ==
Dante's roles are usually alongside Jonathan Loughran and/or Allen Covert. He played Peter in Little Nicky. In Grandma's Boy he played Dante. He played a lawyer named Tommy in Adam Sandler's movie Big Daddy. He played the quarterback Gee Grenouille in The Waterboy and Murph "Murphy" in Mr. Deeds. He played a security guard in 50 First Dates.

Dante was an actor and producer for the film Grandma's Boy. In the film, Dante played a zany drug dealer with a pet chimpanzee, lion and elephant. He played a firefighter in the film I Now Pronounce You Chuck and Larry, and Danny Guiterrez in Strange Wilderness. He also played the role of Steve Spirou's son in Adam Sandler's 2012 film That's My Boy.

Dante also worked in Grown Ups 2 as Officer Peter Dante who was paired up with Shaquille O'Neal's character Officer Fluzoo.

== Controversies ==
On November 19, 2013, after the release of Grown Ups 2, Dante got kicked out of a hotel, after saying the n-word to a staffer, who didn't recognize him as an actor. Due to the incident, he has not appeared in any further Happy Madison films since then.

On September 22, 2020, Dante was arrested in Los Angeles with a misdemeanor charge after an altercation with his neighbor. He was booked into Los Angeles County Jail and was released that night after posting a $5,000 bond. According to the reports, Dante was bothered by loud noises from construction work being done at a neighbor's residence and allegedly "threatened to kill" his neighbor and harm his wife and kids.

== Music ==
Dante is also a musician and singer/songwriter. He recorded with Adam Sandler and Buck Simmonds. He is a member of the music group Rad Omen along with Dirt Nasty, DJ Troublemaker, Steven Laing and Benji Madden. In 2011 he released his debut album Peace, Love, and Freedom. He also appeared in a music video with Afroman in 2015. As of 2020, his most popular songs are "Dirty Road" and "My Purple Tree And Me" a collaboration with indie artist Shadoe. In 2025, he hosted and performed events with former Saving Abel vocalist Scotty Austin, called the "Live Laugh Love tour."

== Education ==
Dante spent a year (1987–1988) at Fork Union Military Academy playing football and lacrosse. He stated in an interview that "it was a good experience going down South".

He is a graduate of Hofstra University, where he played lacrosse. He was an assistant coach for the lacrosse team at Loyola Marymount University for the 2011 season and has coached many club teams, including the Riptide lacrosse team, which made it to the state championships.

== Filmography ==
=== Film ===
Year	Title	Role	Notes
1998	The Wedding Singer	David's Friend	
1998	The Waterboy	Gee Grenouille	
1999	Matters of Consequence	Peter	
1999	Big Daddy	Tommy Grayton	
2000	Little Nicky	Peter	
2002	Mr. Deeds	Murph	
2002	Eight Crazy Nights	Foot Locker Guy (voice)	
2003	Dickie Roberts: Former Child Star	Himself	
2003	The Sanctuary	—N/a	
2003	Stuck on You	Officer J.J. Hill	
2004	50 First Dates	Security Guard	
2004	The Dana & Julia Show	Petey	Television film
2006	Grandma's Boy	Dante	Also associate producer
2007	I Now Pronounce You Chuck & Larry	Tony Paroni	
2008	Strange Wilderness	Danny Gutierrez	
2009	28 Drinks Later	—N/a	Short film
2010	Costa Rican Summer	Dinger	
2011	Just Go with It	Pick-Up Guy #2	
2011	Bucky Larson: Born to Be a Star	Dante	
2011	Jack and Jill	Carol's Boyfriend	
2012	That's My Boy	Dante Spirou	
2013	Grown Ups 2	Officer Dante	
2015	Lord of the Freaks	Himself	Documentary
2017	Green is the New Gold	Himself	Documentary
2021	The Pizza Joint	Bill	

=== Television ===
Year	Title	Role	Notes
1995–1996	The Larry Sanders Show	Steve / Delivery Man	3 episodes Also producer; 14 episodes
1995	The Jeff Foxworthy Show	Howard's Golf Friend	Episode: "A Non-Affair to Remember"
2007	The King of Queens	Justin Ravo	Episode: "Mild Bunch"
2011	Nick Swardson's Pretend Time	Blaze	Episode: "Legalize Meth"
2017	Typical Rick	Slim	Episode: "Glock'n'Roll"
2019	Sugar and Toys	Peter from Bakersfield	Episode: "Burning Scouts"
