= Alexander (Alex Ebert album) =

Studio album by Alex Ebert
- Released: March 1, 2011
- Genre: Indie folk
- Length: 41:10
- Label: Community Records

Singles from Alexander
- 1. "A Million Years" Released: April 18, 2011; 2. "Let's Win!" Released: June 6, 2011; 3. "Truth" Released: July 15, 2011

Alexander is the debut studio album by American musician Alex Ebert, lead singer of Edward Sharpe and the Magnetic Zeros and Ima Robot. It was released on March 1, 2011 under the Community Records label. The song "Truth" was featured in the season 4 premiere of AMC's Breaking Bad titled "Box Cutter". The lead single “A Million Years” was featured in the season 4 episode "Chuck Versus the Wedding Planner" in the NBC series Chuck.

== Production ==
Alex Ebert produced the album during breaks from his work with Edward Sharpe and the Magnetic Zeros and Ima Robot. He played all the instruments on the album himself.

== Promotion ==
Before the release, the entire record was streamed on Alex's website, alexanderebert.com. Alex Ebert, backed up by other members of Edward Sharpe and the Magnetic Zeros, promoted the album heavily in 2011. On July 20, 2011, they performed songs from the album on NPR, and Alex described going solo as "addictive." They performed their song "Truth" on Conan on September 12, 2011. Songs from Alexander were frequently played while on tour with Edward Sharpe and the Magnetic Zeros.

== Critical reception ==
Reviews were average for this album. Rolling Stone gave the album two-and-a-half out of five stars. They stated, "the dream-catcher naiveté he tries on here seems genuine. It's also kind of annoying: 'Would you call the Earth an asshole for turning round and round?/Ya know it never, ever stays in just one place.' We wouldn't, because unlike some people, we weren't skipping out of science class to do 'shrooms." Pitchfork mentioned, "Equal parts charming and trying, unequal parts soul and rock and folk, it's an album that's as easy to love as it is to hate. In fact, I can't keep myself from doing both at once", giving the album a rating of 5.9 out of 10. BBC mentioned, "Ultimately this sounds like a side project, which can only be so disappointing when that’s precisely what it is."

== Track listing ==
All tracks are written by Alexander Ebert.

No.	Title	Length
1.	"Let's Win!"	2:57
2.	"Awake My Body"	5:04
3.	"Truth"	4:21
4.	"In the Twilight"	3:14
5.	"Bad Bad Love"	3:29
6.	"Old Friend"	5:02
7.	"A Million Years"	4:51
8.	"Remember Our Heart"	3:17
9.	"Glimpses"	5:40
10.	"Let's Make a Deal Not to Make a Deal"	3:15
