= Bill Todman Jr. =

American media executive

Bill Todman, Jr.
- Born: William Todman, Jr. May 14, 1956; USA
- Occupation: Media executive

Bill Todman Jr. is an American media executive. He began his career working for his father, Hall of Fame television producer Bill Todman.

== Career ==
In 1981, Todman moved to Goodson-Todman West in Los Angeles to concentrate on television production. He quickly transitioned to MGM/UA Television in 1982 as a programming executive working under the president, Thomas Tannenbaum.

In 1984, Todman joined 20th Century Fox TV as a producer reporting to Leslie Moonves. He moved with Moonves to Lorimar-Telepictures, where Todman teamed up with Joel Simon to form a producing partnership called Todman/Simon Productions that spanned decades. Together, they produced eight television pilots, two series, and one made-for-television movie.

While working in television, Todman and Simon ventured into feature films, producing hit movies such as Married to the Mob and Hard to Kill.

In 1995, Todman became president of Morgan Creek Productions. He served as executive producer on films including Two if by Sea, Ace Ventura: When Nature Calls, Diabolique, Incognito, Wild America, Bad Moon, Major League: Back to the Minors, Wrongfully Accused, and The King and I.

In 1998, Todman produced the feature film Wild Wild West for Warner Bros. In 2000, he co-produced X-Men for 20th Century Fox. He joined forces with Kopelson Entertainment in 1999 for the ABC television program Thieves, while simultaneously producing The In-Laws with Joel Simon at Warner Bros.

In 2003, Todman and Edward L. Milstein formed Level 1 Entertainment. Together, they have produced and financed such motion pictures as Grandma's Boy for 20th Century Fox, Rendition for New Line Cinema, and Strange Wilderness for Paramount Pictures.
