= Marie Jakus =

American biologist and microscopist

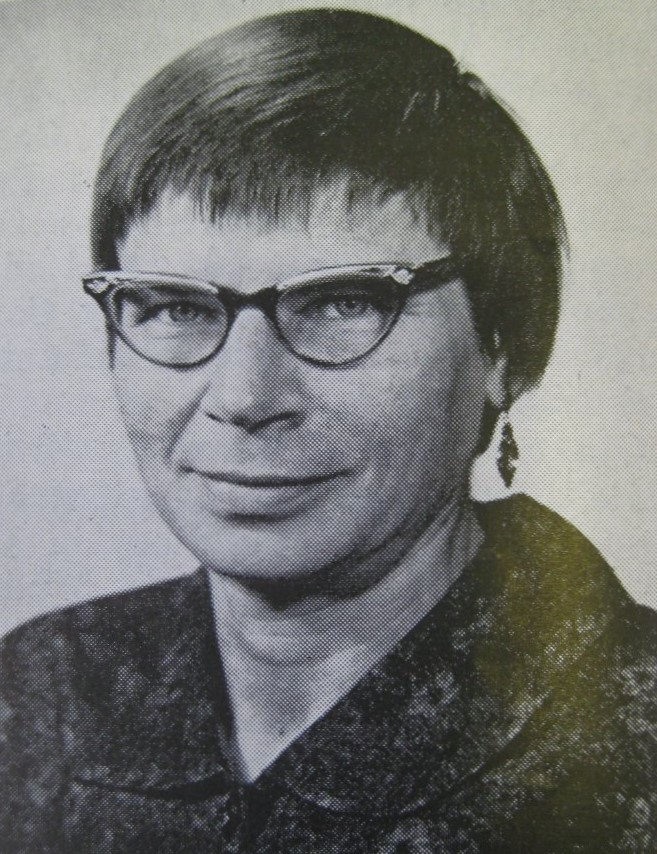
- Born: Marie Agnes Jakus c. 1915; Ohio, US
- Education: Oberlin College; Massachusetts Institute of Technology; Washington University in St. Louis
- Scientific career
- Fields: Biomedical research, electron microscopy
- Workplaces: Massachusetts Institute of Technology; Retina Foundation; National Institutes of Health
- Doctoral advisor: Francis O. Schmitt

Marie Agnes Jakus (born c. 1915) was an American biologist and microscopist specialized in electron microscopic studies of the fine structure of eye tissues. She was a researcher at the Massachusetts Institute of Technology, Retina Foundation, and the National Institute of Neurological Diseases and Blindness before becoming a science administrator at the Center for Scientific Review.

== Early life and education ==
Jakus was born c. 1915 in Ohio to Hungarian immigrants, Anna H. Vintila (née Hovancsik) and Anton Jakus. She had a sister, Florence A. Frash. Jakus completed a B.A. from Oberlin College where she was a student assistant for 5 years. She was a member of Phi Beta Kappa and Sigma Xi. Jakus received a fellowship from Oberlin College in 1938 to study marine invertebrate zoology at Woods Hole Oceanographic Institution. She later worked as a graduate assistant at Washington University in St. Louis between 1938 and 1941, during which she received a fellowship in 1941 to return to Woods Hole to study physiology. Jakus joined the staff of the Massachusetts Institute of Technology (MIT) as a research assistant. At MIT, she began working toward her Ph.D. in biology, receiving it in 1945. Her dissertation was titled The Structure and Properties of the Trichocysts of Paramecium. Jakus' doctoral advisor was Francis O. Schmitt.

== Career ==
Jakus remained at MIT as a research associate. During her 10 years there, she was awarded a Rockefeller Foundation Fellowship and took a year's sabbatical leave to study at the Institute for Cell Research at the Karolinska Institute. In 1951, Jakus joined the Retina Foundation where she developed a national reputation for electron microscopic studies of the fine structure of eye tissues. She has authored and coauthored publications dealing with electron microscopic and ocular studies, among them, a volume of electron micrographs of ocular tissues and papers describing the fine structure of collagen, paramyosin, trichocysts, and Descemet's membrane in the cornea.

Jakus joined the National Institute of Neurological Diseases and Blindness (NINDB) in 1961 as a program coordinator in vision in the extramural programs. ln this capacity, she was responsible for the administration of research grants and programming activities along disease-oriented lines for all disorders of the eye. She became a science administrator and joined the Center for Scientific Review as executive secretary in the visual sciences study section to review, analyze, evaluate, and process research grant applications. Jakus retired in 1977.

Jakus was a member of the Electron Microscopy Society of America, the American Association of Anatomists, and an honorary member of the Association for Research in Ophthalmology.

== Personal life ==
Jakus was interested in photography, music, and reading. She was also a "Royal River Rat," a title she earned in 1968 when she shot the complete course of the Colorado River rapids between Lees Ferry and Temple Bar Marina in a rubber raft.

== Selected works ==
- Schmitt, Francis O.; Hall, Cecil E.; Jakus, Marie A. (August 1942). "Electron microscope investigations of the structure of collagen". Journal of Cellular and Comparative Physiology. 20 (1): 11–33. doi:10.1002/jcp.1030200103. ISSN 0095-9898.
- Jakus, Marie A. (July 1954). "Studies on the Cornea I". American Journal of Ophthalmology. 38 (1): 40–53. doi:10.1016/0002-9394(54)90008-2.
- Jakus, Marie A. (July 1956). "Studies on the Cornea II. The Fine Structure of Descemet's Membrane". The Journal of Biophysical and Biochemical Cytology. 2 (4): 243–252. doi:10.1083/jcb.2.4.243. ISSN 1540-8140. PMC 2229738. PMID 13357549.
- Jakus, Marie A. (April 1962). "Further Observations on the Fine Structure of the Cornea". Investigative Ophthalmology & Visual Science. 1 (2): 202–225. ISSN 1552-5783.
