= Le Funk =

EP by VHS or Beta
- Released: June 11, 2002
- Recorded: September 15, 2001
- Label: ON!
- Producers: Mike Blaine, Kevin Ratterman, VHS or Beta

VHS or Beta chronology
On and On EP (1998)	Le Funk (2002)	Night on Fire (2004)

Professional ratings
Review scores
Source	Rating
AllMusic	4/5 stars
Pitchfork	6.8/10
PopMatters	unfavorable
PopMatters	4/10 (reissue)
The Village Voice	favorable

Le Funk is the second EP by the Louisville-based band VHS or Beta. Originally released in 2002 by ON! Records, it was reissued in 2005 by Astralwerks with three bonus remixes.

== Track listing ==
Adapted from the liner notes of the physical albums.

Le Funk track listing
No.	Title	Length
1.	"Heaven"	5:19
2.	"Disco Paradise"	4:10
3.	"Solid Gold"	7:54
4.	"On and On"	7:12
5.	"Flash" (Live)	8:09
6.	"Teenage Dancefloor" (Live)	7:25
Total length:		39:29

2005 re-issue bonus tracks
No.	Title	Length
7.	"Solid Gold" (Bob Mould Loud Bomb mix)	5:33
8.	"Solid Gold" (Chakra Evolution mix)	8:27
9.	"Solid Gold" (Joshua's Iz Solid mix)	6:22
Total length:		59:11

== Personnel ==
Personnel adapted from the CD booklets of the physical albums. All lyrics and vocals by VHS or Beta except where noted.

- Mike Blaine – Production, engineering, mastering
- Stacy Blakeman – Vocals (Reissue track 1)
- Zeke Buck – Guitar
- Kaiza Cumbler – Vocals (Reissue track 1)
- Hazen Frick – Timbales (Reissue track 1)
- Mark Guidry – Drums
- Maiza Hixson – Vocals (Reissue track 1)
- Matt Johnson – Conga, djembe (Reissue track 3)
- Joshua – Production (Reissue track 9)
- Emily Lazar – Remastering
- Jessica Linker – Vocals (Reissue track 1)
- Bob Mould – Production (Reissue track 7)
- Mark Palgy – Bass guitar
- Craig Pfunder – Guitar
- Kevin Ratterman – Production, engineering
- Sarah Register – Remastering assistant
- Aaron Todovich – Saxophone (Reissue track 2)
