= John Paul Visscher =

American protozoologist (1895–1950)

John Paul Visscher (1895 – February 11, 1950) was an American protozoologist and was a professor and later head of the Biology Department of Western Reserve University in Cleveland, Ohio.

== Biography ==
Visscher was born in 1895 in Holland, Michigan. He got his bachelor's degree from Hope College in his hometown in 1917, and in 1920 and 1924 got his A.M. and Ph.D. degrees from Johns Hopkins University. He served in the U.S. Army during World War I where he was a Lieutenant in the Chemical Warfare Service. From 1920 to 1922 he was an instructor of zoology at Washington University in St. Louis, where he served as a mentor to Francis Otto Schmitt. Two years later he became assistant professor of biology at Western Reserve University. Another two years went by, and he received another promotion, to associate professor. Three years later he became professor, followed by Head of the Biology Department in 1937. He stayed at Western Reserve University until his death in 1950.

Visscher was well known for his discoveries in the protozoology field. He studied barnacles and marine fouling of ships' bottom parts. Starting from 1922 to 1925 he worked as a special investigator for the United States Bureau of Fisheries, with whom he spent most of his summers. During this time he was busy with examination of marine fouling on the U.S. Navy and commercial ships. In 1928 he published his book, Nature and Extent of Fouling of Ships' Bottoms, which was based on his research. During 1935 and 1936, he worked at the United States Navy's Division of Construction and Repair with the same position that he had in 1920s. Ten years later, he became a consultant at the Naval Research Laboratory in Washington, D.C.

Working at Western Reserve University in Cleveland for many years, Visscher had an impact on its biology department as well as the northern Ohio community and local organizations relating to biology. In 1929 he was called upon in a Cleveland case to opine on whether bees feel pain. Visscher contributed to the founding of the Baldwin Bird Research Laboratory and the Cleveland birding community.

The Smithsonian maintains an archive of his papers.

== Honors and memberships ==
- American Association for the Advancement of Science, Fellow
- Ohio Academy of Science, Fellow
- American Society of Naturalists, member
- Cleveland Museum of Natural History, trustee
- Garden Center of Greater Cleveland, trustee
