= Gay Robot =

- Gay Robot as he appears in Nick Swardson's Pretend Time was designed by Stan Winston Studios.
- First appearance: Shhh... Don't Tell
- Portrayed by: Nick Swardson

In-universe information
- Species: Robot
- Gender: Programmed as male

"Gay Robot" is a comedy skit on Adam Sandler's fifth album, Shhh... Don't Tell. In the sketch, a group of friends are watching football when the neighbor calls to let them know that his invention, Gay Robot, is coming over. Gay Robot is very good with football statistics and is very horny because he does not know any other gay guys. The sketch consists of Gay Robot constantly trying to entice the others into sex with him.

== Overview ==
As a comedy TV series, it was initially rejected until posted online, where it became a hit. In 2005 Comedy Central ordered a pilot of Gay Robot as a live-action series from Sony Pictures TV and Adam Sandler and Jack Giarraputo's Happy Madison. In 2006, Comedy Central filmed a pilot for a TV show based on the comedy bit, which has never aired. But clips posted online (first on MySpace) quickly racked up hundreds of thousands of views. The robot, voiced by Nick Swardson, discovers he is gay after a wine cooler is spilled on him and fries his circuit board. According to the Hollywood Reporter, "The original pilot, in which Gay Robot and his fraternity buddies try to find him a date for the homecoming dance, was written by Swardson and Tom Gianas, who both executive produced with Sandler." TV Guide called the show a guilty pleasure and Gay Robot "the feyest droid since C-3PO". Inside the robot itself is actor Doug Jones. In an interview, he confirmed the insides of Gay Robot are based on Jon Lovitz's butler robot guy in The Benchwarmers, named Number 7. Although Jones is in the robot, it takes three people to maneuver Gay Robot. The robot suit costs $250,000. A feature-length Gay Robot movie has been worked up in an initial treatment, but is in limbo.

In 2007, the series was redeveloped as an animated project. The original run is composed of two eleven-minute stories per episode. According to the Comedy Central press release, "[T]he show follows the day-in-the-life adventures of Gay Robot and the guys partying their way through life while trying to find their way in the world." Gay Robot lives with his friends Nick, Pat and Matt after college. The character, voiced by Swardson, appeared in promos for Swardson's new series, Nick Swardson's Pretend Time, and appears in the show. In the premiere of Pretend Time Gay Robot is shown to be a bouncer/door ID-checker at a party where guest star Ryan Phillippe tries to enter, and Gay Robot makes passes at him. In another episode he uses an iPhone Offender App, and as a newer, presumably young, robot he defends himself against a pedophile.

In 2011 Swardson revealed he had written a four-part mystery series, "Gay Robot and the Curse of the Haunted Jockstrap" for Gay Robot, but the network killed it after the script phase.

== Other appearances ==
Posters were also seen in the movie Grandma's Boy. It was shown as a new video game.

In the Futurama episode "Proposition Infinity", Gay Robot can be seen in the crowd during Bender and Amy's speech; he can also be seen dancing at the robosexual parade.

== See also ==
- Gay bomb
- Gaydar
- Geoff Peterson
