= Francis O. Schmitt =

American biologist

- Born: November 23, 1903; St. Louis, Missouri, United States
- Died: October 3, 1995 (aged 91); Weston, Massachusetts
- Education: Washington University in St. Louis
- Known for: Electron microscopy
- Awards: Albert Lasker Award (1956), Alsop Award in 1947, and the T. Duckett Jones Award in 1963
- Scientific career
- Fields: Biology
- Workplaces: MIT
- Doctoral students: Otto Schmitt; Marie Jakus

Francis Otto Schmitt (November 23, 1903 – October 3, 1995) was an American biologist and Institute Professor at the Massachusetts Institute of Technology.

Schmitt was born November 23, 1903, to Otto and Clara Schmitt, in South St. Louis, Missouri. He had two siblings, Otto and Viola. Schmitt's father owned and operated a paint and wallpaper supply store that he established with his father in-law. The store was located on the first floor of the three-story family home. The family rented out the second-floor apartments and lived in the eight rooms on the third floor (Schmitt, 6–8).

Schmitt received an A.B. in 1924 and a Ph.D. in physiology in 1927 from Washington University in St. Louis, where he met and was mentored by John Paul Visscher. During a summer research program at the Marine Biological Laboratory at Woods Hole, Massachusetts, in 1923, he worked with Haldan Keffer Hartline under the supervision Jacques Loeb and Thomas Hunt Morgan. Schmitt joined the faculty in 1929 and taught zoology until 1941. He collaborated extensively with Arthur H. Compton to develop x-ray diffraction techniques for biological macro-structures like muscles and nerves.

Some of Schmitt's and his colleagues' most promising work was done with collagen, fibrinogen, striated, and smooth muscle, along with the fibrous proteins of neurons (Schmitt, 150). In 1952, Schmitt was working with two British students in order to teach them about electron microscopy. Using this new technology, these two students proposed the sliding filament theory of muscle contraction. Groundbreaking research was constantly coming out of his lab.

In 1941, Schmitt was recruited by MIT's Karl Compton and Vannevar Bush to lead radically new Department of Biology there that would combine biology, physics, mathematics, and chemistry. Schmitt became an authority on electron microscopy and conducted innovative studies on kidney function, tissue metabolism, and the chemistry, physiology, biochemistry, and electrophysiology of the nerve. He became Institute Professor in 1955 and professor emeritus in 1973. In 1962, Schmitt helped to found the Neurosciences Research Program and served as its chairman from 1962 to 1974. Schmitt was a member of the National Academy of Sciences, the American Philosophical Society, and a former president of the Electron Microscope Society of America. He was awarded the Albert Lasker Award in 1956, the Alsop Award in 1947, and the T. Duckett Jones Award in 1963.
