= Shhh... Don't Tell =

Studio album by Adam Sandler
- Released: July 13, 2004
- Genre: Comedy rock
- Length: 77:01
- Label: Warner Bros.
- Producers: Brooks Arthur; Allen Covert; Adam Sandler

Adam Sandler chronology
Stan and Judy's Kid (1999)	Shhh... Don't Tell (2004)

Professional ratings
Review scores
Source	Rating
AllMusic	3.5/5 stars

Shhh... Don't Tell is the fifth album by Adam Sandler, released on Warner Bros. Records in 2004. It is a collection of songs and skits that feature the voices of Sandler himself, Allen Covert, Rob Schneider, Peter Dante, Jonathan Loughran, David Spade, Blake Clark, Nick Swardson, Maya Rudolph and Molly Shannon. The album's final track, "Stan the Man", is a tribute to Sandler's father, Stanley and is his first non-comedic track. It was later played over the end credits of the 2010 film Grown Ups, which co-starred Sandler, Schneider, Spade and Rudolph. This was also Sandler's last comedy album until the audio release of his 2018 Netflix special 100% Fresh.

== Track listing ==
Shhh... Don't Tell track listing
No.	Title	Length
1.	"Sid & Alex"	2:12
2.	"Pibb Goes Surfing"	2:01
3.	"**The Amazing Willy Wanker**"	4:17
4.	"Gay Robot"	4:01
5.	"Pibb Tries the Skateboarding"	2:17
6.	"Creepin' on the Mayor"	1:16
7.	"**The Mayor of Pussytown**"	3:47
8.	"Timmy Tinyhole"	0:21
9.	"Pibb Takes the Mexican ATV Tour"	3:22
10.	"Wolfman"	5:06
11.	"**Secret**"	4:42
12.	"The Boss and the Secretary"	5:08
13.	"**Best Friend**"	3:33
14.	"Pibb Needs the Hot Rocks"	6:08
15.	"**The Mule Session**"	3:45
16.	"Newlyweds, Sleepyheads"	5:16
17.	"Calling Home"	9:00
18.	"**Mr. I Do and the Doo Doos**"	2:38
19.	"Whore! Where Are You?!"	4:32
20.	"**Stan the Man**"	3:50
Total length:		77:01

Tracks in bold are songs.

== Personnel ==
- Adam Sandler – main performer, vocals, producer
- Rob Schneider – Mr. Karachi on "Whore! Where Are You?!"
- Allen Covert – performer, producer
- Peter Dante – performer
- David Spade – performer
- Blake Clark – performer
- Nick Swardson – performer
- Betsy Hammer – performer, vocals, backing vocals, design
- Adam & the Brooktones – backing vocals
- Jeannie Perkins – backing vocals
- Teddy Castellucci – acoustic guitar, arranger
- Waddy Wachtel – guitar
- Dave Marotta – bass guitar
- Craig Doerge – piano, keyboards
- Tom Mgrdichian – keyboards, programming
- Stuart Grusin – organ
- Don Heffington – drums, percussion
- Fred Howard – sound effects
- Brooks Arthur – producer, photography, yells, falsetto
- Janice Soled – production coordination
- Nicholaus Goossen – associate producer
- Gabe Veltri – engineer, digital editing, mixing
- Eric Mayron – tracking engineer, digital editing, mixing
- Francis "Franny G" Graham – tracking engineer, digital editing, mixing
- Bob Wayne – analog engineer
- Clayton Weber – assistant engineer
- Bernie Grundman – mastering
- Andy Brohard – engineer
- Mike Butler – digital editing
- Jay Goin – digital editing
- Ted Lobinger – digital editing, group member, sound design
- Bryan Zee – digital editing, mixing
- The Happy Madison Players: Orada Justatayanond, Ted Lobinger, Ching Lee, Nicholaus Goossen, Elmo Weber on "Pibb Takes the Mexican ATV Tour"

== Charts ==
=== Weekly charts ===
Weekly chart performance for Shhh... Don't Tell
Chart (2004)	Peak position
US Billboard 200	47
US Top Comedy Albums (Billboard)	11

=== Songs chart positions ===
Chart performance for songs from Shhh... Don't Tell
Title	Year	Peak chart positions
Title	Year	Dance
"Secret (E. Baez & Orange Factory Mixes)"	2004	19
