= Schepens Eye Research Institute =

Schepens Eye Research

The Schepens Eye Research Institute, formerly known as the Retina Foundation Institute of Biological and Medical Sciences, is an independent nonprofit research foundation founded c. 1950 by ophthalmologist Charles Schepens that operates as part of the research program of Massachusetts Eye and Ear. In 1976, singer Ella Fitzgerald performed a benefit concert to show appreciation after her medical procedure. Doctors from the foundation occasionally travelled to India to perform operations for villagers. By 1964, 14 years after its establishment, the foundation had 88 staff members and received 60 percent of its funding from the government and the rest from private sector contributions. Frances Todman was named chairperson in 1985. She was a member of the national board of trustees and the corporation board. In 1986, the foundation employed over 100 researchers.

== Notable people ==
- Charles L. Schepens, founder and president
- Endre Alexander Balazs, researcher
- Marie Jakus, researcher
- Ralph Lowell, chairperson
- Frances Todman, chairperson
- W. Clement Stone, chair of fundraising
- Rao Sanadi, section chief of gerontology
