= Neuroscience Research Program =

The Neuroscience Research Program (NRP) is an inter-university and international organisation founded during 1962 by Francis Otto Schmitt and others, which marked a key moment in the foundation of neuroscience as a discipline.

A primary activity of the NRP was in making links between neural and behavioural sciences. The programs three core areas of interest were molecular biology, the Nervous system (neural) and psychology

Funded by federal grants from the government of the United States of America, and additionally sponsored by Massachusetts Institute of Technology, the program was headquartered at the American Academy of Arts and Sciences based in Boston House. It operated a twice weekly meeting with guest speakers talking on key issues pertaining to neuroscience, and published its findings through the Neuroscience Research program Bulletin to libraries and other individuals working in the field.

Frank Schmitt had earlier organised a meeting (seminar series) of persons at M.I.T. during 1960 and 1961, who were interested in developing cross-disciplinary understandings in the fields of physics, chemistry, and the structural examination of the brain, together with using knowledge of new psychological, psychiatric and behavioural findings. During February 1962, Schmitt invited a select number of highly esteemed scientists to a meeting within New York city, at which they all agreed to formulate a new organisation, which was named at Schmitts' bequest, and due to be located at Brookline Massachusetts.

The program held six work-sessions each year, conferences which gave rise to published reports, intensive study programs (ISP's) triannually, and special conferences which were held for specific projects, where scientists suggested ways in which the most progress in neuroscience might be made, these were referred to generally by the term Whither, held both within the United States of America, and also at other international locations.

Katheryn Cusick was executive secretary from 1964.
