= The Southern Theater =

Coordinates: 44°58′24.16″N 93°14′53.06″W

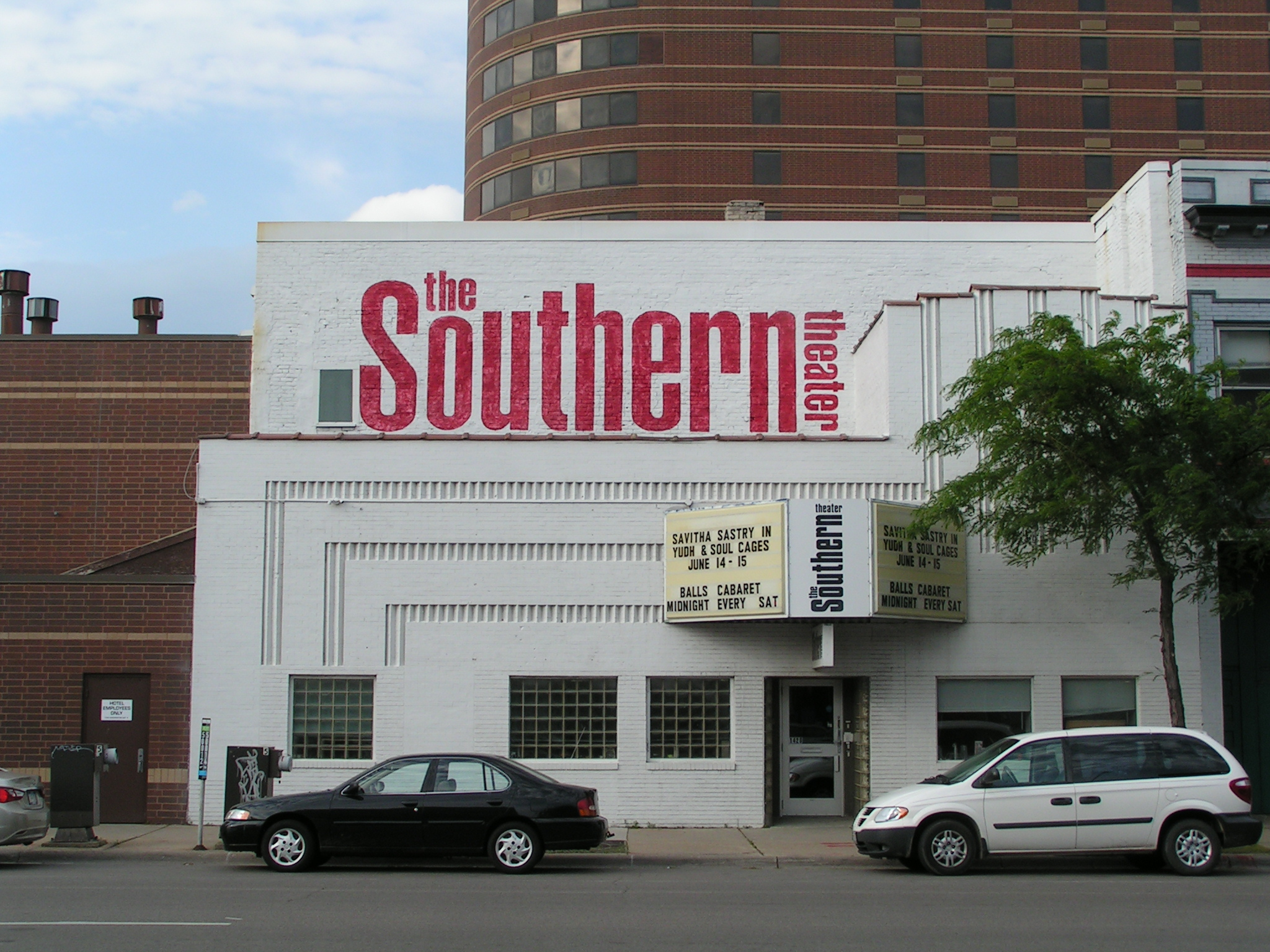
Exterior of The Southern Theater, 2013

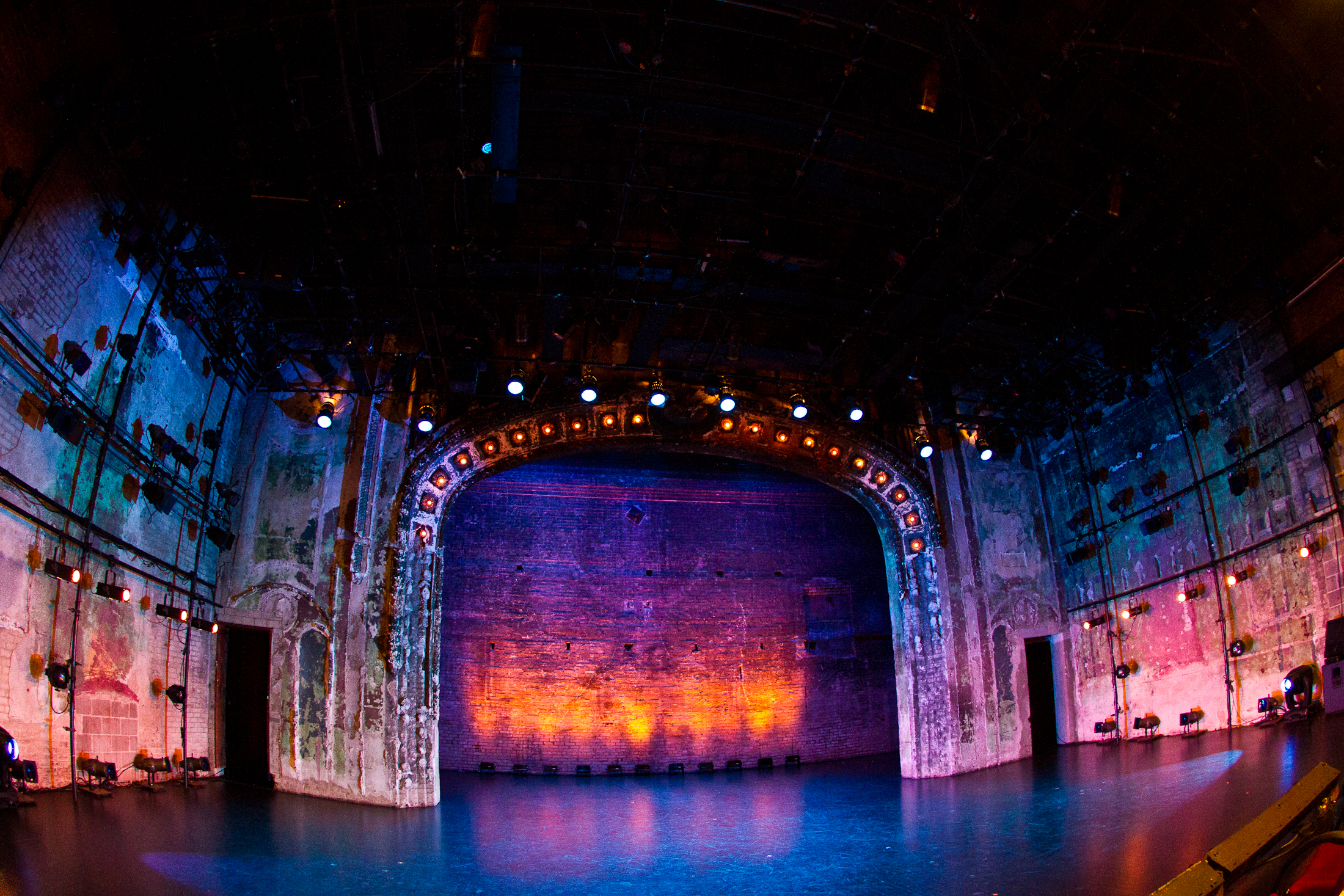
Interior of the Southern in 2010 during the Minnesota Fringe Festival

The Southern Theater is located in the Cedar-Riverside neighborhood of Minneapolis, Minnesota. Built in 1910 as a cultural center and legitimate theater for the burgeoning Scandinavian community centered on Cedar Avenue ("Snoose Boulevard"), the Southern has been re-established as a center for contemporary performing arts over the past quarter-century. The Southern Theater is the home of Balls Cabaret, a weekly midnight cabaret entering its twenty-fourth year.

== Building history ==
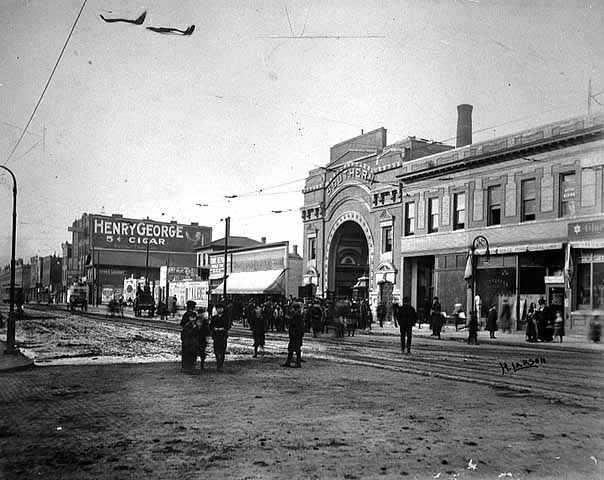
The Southern Theater, 1910

The 1910-era Southern featured vaudeville shows, Saturday silent movies for the kids, and original-language Scandinavian plays by the likes of August Strindberg and Bjørnstjerne Bjørnson. (It also featured "a set of electric chimes, twenty-seven bells scattered through the house and played by electricity… this is an entirely new feature in the Northwest.") It maintained close ties with Stockholm’s Södra Teatern (Southern Theater); an exchange program allowed actors from one Southern to perform at the other when visiting Minneapolis or Stockholm.

During the 1920s the Southern offered silent films with occasional evenings of live drama, vaudeville, and amateur variety shows. In the 1930s, with the arrival of talking pictures, it became a neighborhood movie theater; in the 1940s it became an adults-only movie house which ultimately went out of business.

In the late 1940s it was taken over by a contractor who used the building as a garage for heavy road equipment, leveling the floor and opening up large garage doors through the walls to accommodate his needs. (Sometime during this period the original façade was demolished as well.) It then became a warehouse and a gift shop, and in 1959 the Gaslight Restaurant opened. The Gaslight is still remembered by some as a coveted fancy dining destination (and by others as the site of marvelous pyrotechnics courtesy of the inebriated gentleman whose job it was to light the outside gaslight). The restaurant, which includes a marble bar and ticket counter, closed in the mid 1960s and the building stood vacant for about ten years.

In 1975 the Guthrie Theater leased the space and refurbished it as a performance space. The Guthrie 2 had two primary components: a resident (Equity) acting company which performed "mainstage" shows at 8 PM (one of whose members was John Pielmeier, who later went on to write "Agnes of God"), and a "Community Space Program" which enabled local performers in all disciplines to use the space for late-night productions. Such notable Twin Cities performing groups as Theatre de la Jeune Lune, Illusion Theater, and Zenon Dance Company (then "Ozone") had some of their first performances as part of this program.

The Equity Company aspect of the Guthrie 2 was disbanded after just a few months, but the Community Space Program lived on for several more years until the Guthrie terminated the lease on the building and closed its doors in 1979. A concerted community effort resulted in ownership being transferred to an independent non-profit corporation, the Southern Theater Foundation, and the space was again re-opened under its original "Southern Theater" name. The Southern has now been in continuous operation since 1981 as a home for the Twin Cities’ finest independent performing artists.
