= Tom Gianas =

American comedy writer, director and producer

Tom Gianas is an American comedy writer, director and producer. Gianas was the showrunner for the MTV sketch-comedy series Human Giant. He has collaborated with and directed Bob Odenkirk in Half My Face Is a Clown, Sarah Silverman in Jesus Is Magic, which was adapted to Sarah Silverman: Jesus Is Magic, and Jack Black in Tenacious D. Tom was also a writer and director on Saturday Night Live and Nick Swardson's Pretend Time on Comedy Central, which he co-created with Nick Swardson.
