= Balls Cabaret =

Weekly cabaret based in Minneapolis, Minnesota

Coordinates: 44°58′24.16″N 93°14′53.06″W

BALLS Cabaret is a weekly cabaret based in Minneapolis, Minnesota.

== History ==
Created and hosted by singer Leslie Ball, the cabaret began at the Jungle Theater in 1991, and later moved to The Southern Theater. The Cabaret is intended to give both experienced and novice performers approximately seven minutes on stage to do any material of their choosing.

The show went on hiatus in March 2020 and re-opened in a new time slot at Strike Theater in Northeast Minneapolis.

== Press coverage ==
BALLS Cabaret has been cited as "one of the most important laboratories for new talent in [the Twin Cities]", and alumni of BALLS include Adrianne Lenker, Maria Bamford, Mary Jo Pehl, Joel Hodgson, Frank Conniff, Nick Swardson, and Tay Zonday.
