= Nick Swardson's Pretend Time =

Television sketch comedy show

- Created by: Nick Swardson; Tom Gianas
- Directed by: Tom Gianas
- Starring: Nick Swardson
- Country of origin: United States
- Original language: English
- No. of seasons: 2
- No. of episodes: 14

Production
- Executive producers: Nick Swardson; Tom Gianas; Allen Covert
- Producer: Horatio Sanz
- Running time: 22 minutes
- Production companies: Happy Madison Productions; Culver Entertainment

Original release
- Network: Comedy Central
- Release: October 12, 2010 – November 16, 2011

Nick Swardson's Pretend Time is a sketch comedy television show created by and starring actor and comedian Nick Swardson. The show premiered on Tuesday, October 12, 2010, at 10 p.m. EST on Comedy Central and ran for two seasons, with the final first-run episode airing November 16, 2011.

== Overview ==
Each episode would begin with Swardson doing stand-up comedy on stage, in front of an audience at a comedy club. He would tell jokes and discuss a topic which would be relevant to the episode. This would usually be something random about himself or about the show. The episode would then cut away to several pretaped sketches.

The show featured comedic sketches, such as Wheelchair Cat, a masturbating sniper, and a parody of Nightmare on Elm Street involving incest-related dreams. Each episode from the first season included appearances from an animated character named Gay Robot, who originally appeared on Adam Sandler's comedy album Shh...Don't Tell. Gay Robot was voiced by Nick Swardson.

All of the episode titles were named after Nick's favorite line from each episode. For instance, in the season one finale, a house owner asks their guest if they know what the address of the house is, and the guest replies sarcastically with "Um... I don't know... Blah Blah Blah Main Street?" The latter part of the line was chosen as the title for the seventh episode of the first season.

The show was produced by Adam Sandler's Happy Madison Productions, and comedian Horatio Sanz was one of the producers.

On September 28, 2011, a 'Clip Show' episode was aired featuring the most popular skits from the first season.

On February 6, 2012, Swardson announced through his Facebook account that there would be no more episodes made. Reruns of the show still air sporadically on Comedy Central.

== Episodes ==
=== Season 1 (2010) ===
No.	Title	Guest(s)	Original release date
1	"Powdered Donuts Make Me Go Nuts"	Natasha Leggero & Ryan Phillippe	October 12, 2010
Nick dedicates the episode to his dead cat Fitzgerald. Sketches include a paralyzed cat, the television introduction of Gay Robot, a father who writes a "bucket list" for his son, a car that runs on urine, and a profile of Lady Gaga's brother, Garry, a New Jersey police officer. This episode was dedicated to comedian Greg Giraldo
2	"The Leather Swingset With the Monkey and the Gun"	Finesse Mitchell & Shwayze	October 19, 2010
Nick discusses how dirty the show can be. Sketches include inappropriate paramedics, a house haunted by an optically challenged portrait, Gay Robot's creepy neighbor, an ill-fated jungle expedition, and a civil-rights-era fable.
3	"I Just Got Voodoo'd"	Nick Kroll, Paul F. Tompkins, & Katrina Bowden	October 26, 2010
Nick talks about the trouble they had casting the Freddy Krueger sketch. Sketches include a parody of Nightmare on Elm Street, a parody of Top Chef, Nick as a ballet dancer, and a parody of a 1940s mummy film.
4	"Mudslide Junction"	Adam Scott, Kerri Kenney, & Horatio Sanz	November 2, 2010
Nick talks about how happy he is to be working with Gay Robot again. Sketches include a cereal parody with an insane sponsor, a radio personality who has a knack for delivering bad news, and innovative camping equipment.
5	"Relapse Into Refreshment"	Duncan Trussell, Matt Walsh, & Bob Odenkirk	November 9, 2010
Nick discusses his obsession with scatological humor at an early age. Sketches include a TV show about a masturbating sniper, pirates following a treasure map tattooed to one of their scrotums, and a man with unorthodox survival skills such as bashing out his teeth to make a weapon to fight night creatures and bigfoot, eating rocks, and giving himself oral sex.
6	"Monday Morning Meltdown"	Paul Scheer & Harland Williams	November 16, 2010
A parody of James Cameron's Avatar set in an office, a TV show, called "Critter Getters", about two men capturing a bear, and an appearance by Superman.
7	"Blah Blah Blah Main Street"	Richard Riehle, Laura Kightlinger, & Owen Benjamin	November 23, 2010
Nick discusses his horrible kitten sweater. Featuring sketches about an ill-fated couple's role playing, a family's guest with an uncontrollable need for the bath room, Gay Robot trying to buy plane tickets to an alien probing site, the scenario of Titanic if it was in an underwater planet, a forest ranger's job of breaking up homosexual intimacy, the recovery of a time capsule filled with sexual objects, and a man who wants to work at a cupcake factory with a twist.

=== Season 2 (2011) ===
No.	Title	Guest(s)	Original release date
8	"Baby Not From Booty"	TBA	October 5, 2011
This season premiere features Nick discussing dive bars, a parody of "16 and Pregnant," an infomercial for an unorthodox way to get better abs, and Wheelchair Cat defending one of his 9 lives in court. Guest starring Simon Rex.
9	"Show Me on the Doll"	Too Short	October 12, 2011
Nick confesses to involvement in a bathroom mishap, along with sketches including a space alien paternity test, a successful trial lawyer, and a cleaning product that picks up stubborn stains. Guest starring Jay Johnston
10	"PETA Not on Set"	TBA	October 19, 2011
Nick discusses figure skating and smartphones, Vanilla: the suicidal dog, Handyman 3000 private masturbator, "Meating" the Parents, Piñata Your Body, Party Olympics, Live News, Pump Punch punching bag.
11	"Full Blown Eggs"	Laura Silverman, Jay Johnston, & Steve Agee	October 26, 2011
Nick's run-in with his mother's cat; Party Pants; Wheelchair Cat and the cocaine overdose girl; Big Tits Eat Free; People's Corner: Frank Jaspers; Victims of the recession: Bargain Bob's; Adult predators.
12	"The Mis-Education of Garry Gaga"	TBA	November 2, 2011
Nick discusses flying next to Liv Tyler; Famous Siblings Vol.10: Garry Gaga; NanaStall; Face transplant from Denny's medical center; The Drunk Whisperer; drunk driving and the NBA; Fist Cam; Stuck in an elevator.
13	"Flying Stripper"	Ron Perlman	November 9, 2011
Nick discusses Johnny Depp's great life; a couple's magic show date ends badly; The Flying Stripper; Do we know each other?; Failed inventions; Creepio turns Thanksgiving into a nightmare; missing woman.
14	"Legalize Meth"	Owen Benjamin & Jeff Richards	November 16, 2011
Nick discusses sketches that didn't make it; drunk girls cause problems at a fast food restaurant; a first time dad gets upset about visitors at a hospital's baby nursery.
