= Bring On the Comets =

Bring On The Comets

Studio album by VHS or Beta
- Released: August 28, 2007
- Genre: Electronic
- Length: 43:46
- Label: Astralwerks
- Producer: Brandon Mason

VHS or Beta chronology
Night on Fire (2004)	Bring On The Comets (2007)	Diamonds and Death (2011)

Professional ratings
Aggregate scores
Source	Rating
Metacritic	53/100
Review scores
Source	Rating
The A.V. Club	D+
AllMusic	3/5 stars
Alternative Press	2/5 stars
LAS Magazine	7.7/10
Pitchfork	4.6/10
Prefix Magazine	5/10
Rolling Stone	3/5 stars
Spin	1.5/5 stars

Bring on the Comets is the third studio album by American indie rock band VHS or Beta. It was released on August 28, 2007 on Astralwerks.

== Release ==
On March 26, 2007, VHS or Beta announced they were releasing their third studio album.

== Tour ==
In support of the album, the band went on tour of North America, starting on August 2, 2007 at Popscene in San Francisco, and finished up at Headliners Music Hall in Louisville, Kentucky on September 29, 2007.

== Critical reception ==
Bring On the Comets was met with "mixed or average" reviews from critics. At Metacritic, which assigns a weighted average rating out of 100 to reviews from mainstream publications, this release received an average score of 53 based on 12 reviews.

In a review for AllMusic, critic reviewer Jason Lymangrover wrote: "The grooves that were once the cornerstone for their early work are much less noticeable here, as they've been draped with grandiose, sweeping choruses. Becoming more concise and memorable songwriters is a good thing, but now the result is too much like straight-up '80s pop sprinkled with dance-punk sensibilities. The songs aren't remarkable and they aren't bad, they're just there." Annie Zaleski of Alternative Press describe the album as "quite a bit slicker and sonically feels as if it could fill an arena-but lacks the personality of the prior album." Nate Patrin of Pitchfork said: "Bring on the Comets doesn't prove that good rock is harder to make than good disco, just that it's a lot easier to make boring."

Writing for Spin, writer Stacey Anderson wrote: "Bring on the Comets is ultimately a bland regression. Percolating synthesizers bleed into the album's unrelenting mid-tempo beat, as Craig Pfunder mewls like Robert Smith, highbred Sloane-y accent and all. Even the mix is tinny, like a fuzzy trip through an unremarkable memory."

== Track listing ==
All tracks are written by Craig Pfunder, unless noted.

Bring On the Comets track listing
No.	Title	Writer(s)	Length
1.	"Euglama"		1:08
2.	"Love in My Pocket"		3:13
3.	"She Says"		3:31
4.	"Can't Believe a Single Word"		3:43
5.	"Burn it All Down"		3:37
6.	"Take it or Leave it"		4:08
7.	"Alpha Theta"	Mark Palgy	0:42
8.	"Bring on the Comets"	Mark Guidry; Palgy; Pfunder	4:03
9.	"Fall Down Lightly"	Guidry; Palgy; Pfunder	4:01
10.	"We Could Be One"	Guidry; Palgy; Pfunder	5:11
11.	"Time Stands Still"		4:05
12.	"The Stars Where We Came From"		6:24

iTunes bonus track (Australian version)
No.	Title	Length
13.	"Army of None"	3:38

== Personnel ==
Musicians

- Craig Pfunder – Guitar, piano, vocals
- Mark Guidry – Drums
- Mark Palgy – Bass
- Jim James – Guitar (acoustic), vocals (background)
- Bo Koster – Piano

Production

- Brandon Mason – Producer, engineer, mixing
- Mark Petaccia – Engineer
- Fred Kevorkian – Mastering
- Errol Kolosine – A&R
- Carl Broemel – Pedal steel
- Greg Foley – Design, cover art
