= Night on Fire =

Album by VHS or Beta

Studio album by VHS or Beta
- Released: September 21, 2004
- Recorded: March 4, 2004
- Genre: Indie rock, dance-punk, synthpop
- Length: 52:38
- Label: Astralwerks
- Producer: Martin Brumbach, Adam Dorn

VHS or Beta chronology
| Le Funk EP (2002) | Night on Fire (2004) | Bring on the Comets (2007) |

Professional ratings
Aggregate scores
| Source | Rating |
|---|---|
| Metacritic | 60/100 |
Review scores
| Source | Rating |
| AllMusic | 3/5 stars |
| Alternative Press | 2/5 stars |
| Blender | 4/5 stars |
| Drowned in Sound | 7/10 |
| NME | 7/10 |
| Paste | 2/5 stars |
| Pitchfork | 4.2/10 |
| Rolling Stone | 3/5 stars |
| Q | 2/5 stars |
| Stylus Magazine | 7/10 |

Night on Fire is the debut album by VHS or Beta. It was released September 21, 2004 on Astralwerks.

The song "Night on Fire" was featured in the video game MLB 06: The Show and the film Grandma's Boy.

== Track listing ==
1. "Night on Fire" – 4:01
2. "You Got Me" – 3:36
3. "Nightwaves" – 5:41
4. "The Melting Moon" – 4:20
5. "No Cabaret!" – 5:47
6. "Forever" – 5:43
7. "Alive" – 5:05
8. "Dynamize" – 4:49
9. "The Ocean" – 4:36
10. "Irreversible" – 9:00
