= Alex Ebert =

American singer-songwriter and composer

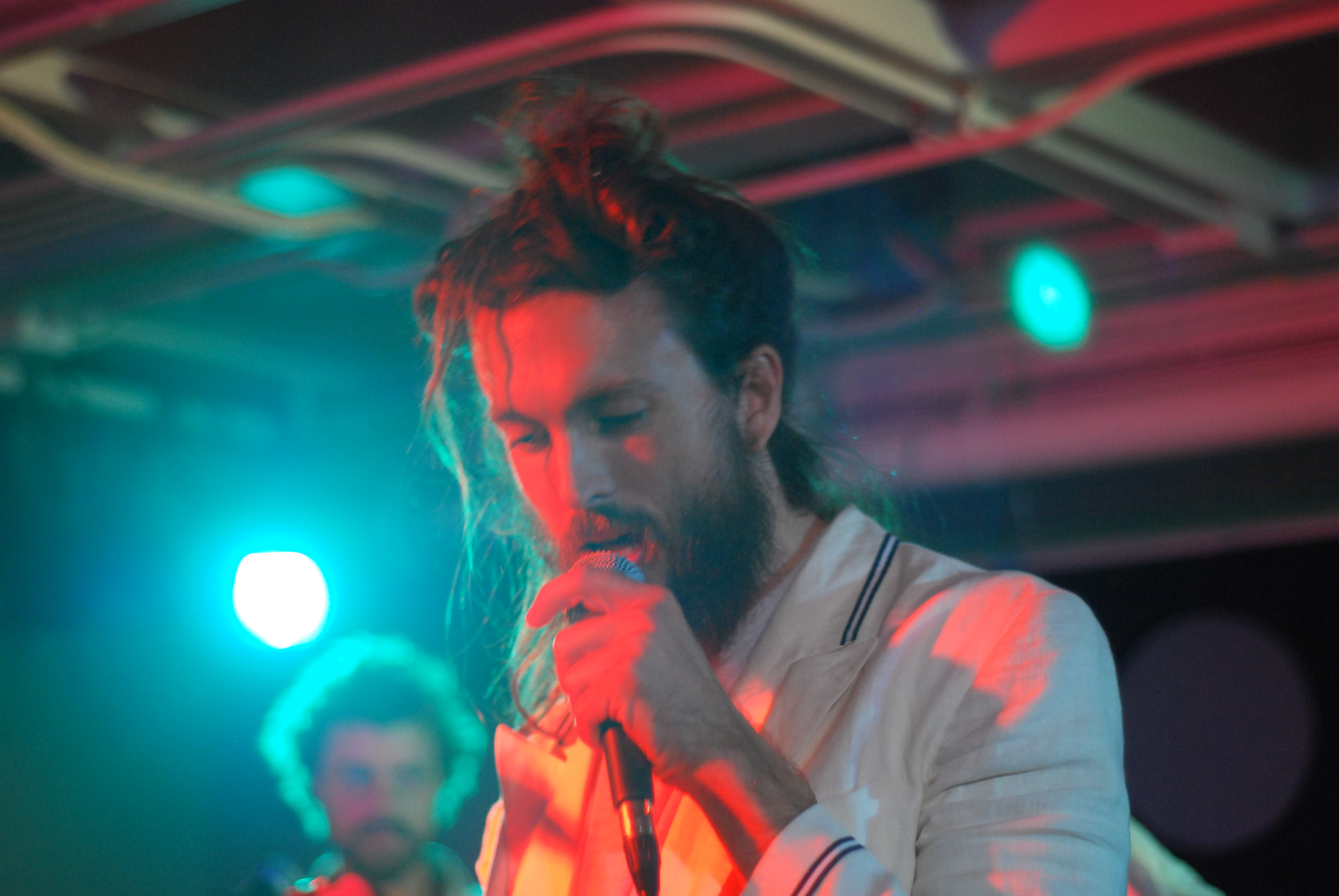
- Alex Ebert performing with Edward Sharpe and the Magnetic Zeros in 2009.

Background information
- Also known as: Edward Sharpe
- Born: Alexander Michael Tahquitz Ebert; May 12, 1978 (age 48); Los Angeles, California, U.S.
- Genres: Indie rock, psychedelic rock, pop rock, folk
- Occupations: Singer-songwriter, composer
- Instruments: Vocals; guitar; piano; percussion
- Years active: 1997–present
- Labels: Virgin Records, Rough Trade Records, Vagrant Records, Community Music, Echo Park Records, Werewolf Heart

Alexander Michael Tahquitz Ebert (born May 12, 1978) is an American singer-songwriter and composer. He is best known for being the lead singer and songwriter for the American bands Ima Robot and Edward Sharpe and the Magnetic Zeros. On January 12, 2014, Ebert won the Golden Globe Award for Best Original Score for his musical score to the film All Is Lost (2013).

== Early life ==
Ebert was born in Los Angeles in 1978, the son of a psychotherapist, Michael Ebert, and actress Lisa Richards. His father would often take the family on long car trips through the desert. On one such trip, his mother took a video of his father chanting in the desert, cradling Alex's baby sister, Gabi, which would one day become a part of the video for the Edward Sharpe and the Magnetic Zeros song "Desert Song". His grandfather, Carl Ebert, was a prominent German actor, director, and opera administrator who emigrated to California following the rise of Adolf Hitler.

His full birth name is Alexander Michael Tahquitz Ebert, as his father took one of his son's names from his favorite climbing rock, Tahquitz Rock. In Cahuilla religion, Tahquitz is a spirit associated with death or evil.

His father influenced young Alexander by playing music by artists like Patsy Cline, Willie Nelson, and Johnny Cash. He also cites 60s R&B, Pavarotti, and Beethoven as influences, as well as his elementary school (Children's Community School) teacher, a woman from South Africa named Ruth Belonsky. Ebert enjoyed listening to hip-hop as a teenager, and originally intended to be a rapper.

Following a school project on Marlon Brando, Ebert developed an affection for film and cinematic studies. His mother supported his budding passion and Ebert consequently was enrolled in extracurricular filmmaking classes. Ebert attended Oakwood School for high school, and then Emerson College for a time before dropping out. After dropping out, Ebert directed a short film and wrote several screenplays. He attributes the revival of his interest in professional music to his childhood friends and excessive drug usage during that period of his life.

== Career ==
=== Ima Robot ===
Ebert began writing and recording music (primarily rap) with his longtime friend Tim "Timmy the Terror" Anderson in 1997. The duo, occasionally joined by local DJs and longtime friends Oliver "Oligee" Goldstein and Jason "One Three/ComputerJay" Taylor, recorded demos under various names with various other members until they settled on a final name in 1999, Ima Robot, which originated from an inside joke between Anderson and Ebert. With Goldstein as an official third member, Ima Robot began recording demos and performing shows around Los Angeles. The band was signed to Virgin Records on 2002. Their first full-length album released on September 6, 2003, was Ima Robot, which featured the singles "Dynomite" and "Song #1." After the departure of Goldstein (and other members), bassist Filip Nikolic joined in 2005. On September 12, 2006, Ima Robot released their second album Monument to the Masses which featured the singles "Creeps Me Out" and "Lovers in Captivity". In April 2007, the band won their independence from Virgin Records and continued to work unsigned under the management of Alexis Rivera of Echo Park Records. The song "Gangster" premiered on the band's MySpace on April 15, 2008, with its lyrics posted in a blog entry by the band. In 2010 the band announced the upcoming release of their new album, Another Man's Treasure, and released the song "Ruthless" on the Internet. They are now being represented by Anderson's Werewolf Heart label. Ebert was quoted as saying that "most of the songs were recorded between two and four years ago", but that he looks forward to making music with Anderson and Nikolic again. Ebert expressed frustration with the corporate limitations on the band, saying he "pretty unironically ended up feeling like a robot by the end of the process because of the major label thing."

=== Edward Sharpe and the Magnetic Zeros ===
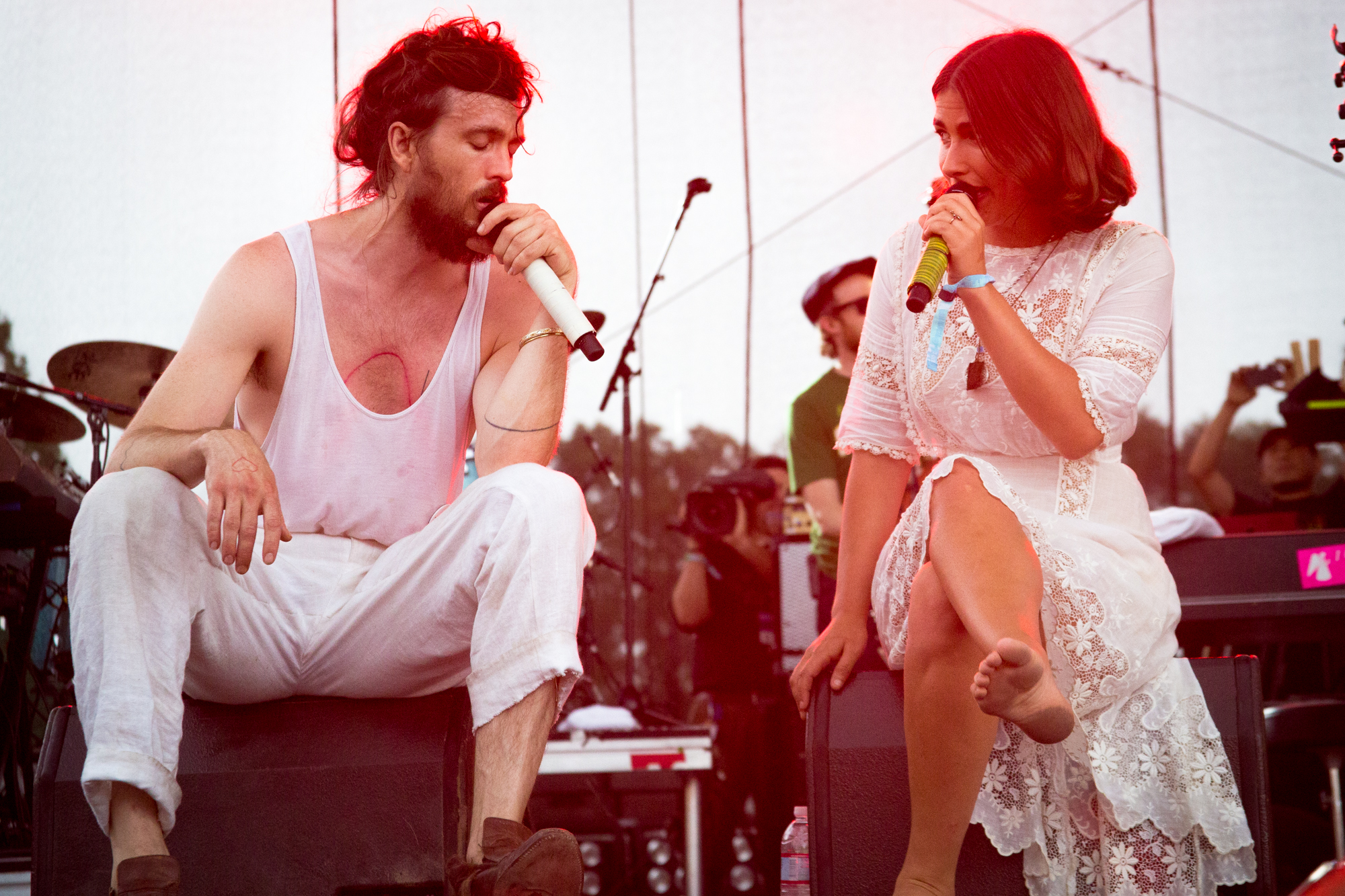
Alex Ebert with Jade Castrinos at Bonnaroo

After years of his Los Angeles party lifestyle and subsequent drug addiction, Ebert broke up with his then-girlfriend, moved out of his house, and spent some time in rehab. During this time, he developed Edward Sharpe, his alter ego. "I don't want to put too much weight on it, because in some ways it's just a name that I came up with. But I guess if I look deeper, I do feel like I had lost my identity in general. I really didn't know what was going on or who I was anymore. Adopting another name helped me open up an avenue to get back." Ebert developed Sharpe into a messianic figure, saying "He was sent down to Earth to kinda heal and save mankind, but he kept getting distracted by girls and falling in love."

Though the band would eventually grow into an ensemble of – at various points – even more than 10 people, Ebert began initial writing and recording completely alone, doing "the horn lines with my mouth or a kazoo on the demos" and "all the background vocals layering [him]self, pretending that there were people there." The band began to take shape with the addition of singer Jade Castrinos, whom he saw sitting on an outdoor bench and has said he immediately knew he needed to have a relationship with. Their resultant affair formed the seeds of what would become Edward Sharpe and the Magnetic Zeros. They started writing music together, and became a part of the art and music collective The Masses, which was partially started by some seed money from actor Heath Ledger. Although their relationship did not last, the group gained popularity, soon swelling to more than 10 members, some of whom had been Ebert's friends since he was young. By summer 2009, they were touring the country. Their first album, Up from Below, was released in July 2009. Edward Sharpe and the Magnetic Zeros appeared on the Late Show with David Letterman on May 10, 2012, promoting their next album entitled Here, which was released on May 29, 2012. Their third full-length album, Edward Sharpe and the Magnetic Zeros, was released on July 23, 2013. They again appeared on the Late Show to promote the album, performing the track "Life Is Hard."

On their most recent album, PersonA, Ebert tried to evolve, stating, "In a lot of ways this album does things that are missing." He went on to discuss why the name Edward Sharpe is crossed out on the cover, saying, "There was no character to begin with, so why not kill him? He never really was there. If anything, and at most, Edward Sharpe was a vehicle for me to get to slough off whatever I had become up until that point, and to get back to or sort of allow my pure self to come forth into sort of a clean slate."

=== Solo career ===
In 2011, Ebert released his first solo album, Alexander. He appeared on Conan on September 12, 2011, to promote his solo album.

On August 4, 2015, it was announced that Ebert would appear as the lead singer on Avicii's single "For a Better Day" from his album Stories.

"Feel the Bern" was added to Ebert's SoundCloud on September 30, 2015. The anthem celebrates the movement surrounding Bernie Sanders and compels people to "Feel the Bern", which was a slogan of Bernie's 2016 & 2020 presidential campaigns.

Ebert's second non-soundtrack solo album I vs I was released on January 31, 2020. Ebert has said that I vs I is “The most in-my-emotions, emo, self-centered album that I’ve probably ever made, but it’s been part of my process to get back to myself.”

=== Theatre ===
Ebert wrote the song "Daddy Knows Best" for SpongeBob SquarePants: The Broadway Musical. As part of the team of songwriters who contributed to the score (which included Cyndi Lauper, Panic! At the Disco, and John Legend), Ebert was awarded the Outer Critics Circle Award for Outstanding New Score (Broadway or Off-Broadway) and was nominated for the Tony Award for Best Original Score.

== Personal life ==
Ebert has a daughter with former partner Roehm Hepler-Gonzalez. Ebert began a relationship with actress Jena Malone in 2019.

== Discography ==
With Ima Robot

- Ima Robot (2003)
- Monument to the Masses (2006)
- Another Man's Treasure (2010)
- Search and Destroy (original limited release, 2003; rerelease November 14, 2025)

With Edward Sharpe and the Magnetic Zeros

- Here Comes EP (2009)
- Up from Below (2009)
- Here (2012)
- Edward Sharpe and the Magnetic Zeros (2013)
- PersonA (2016)

Solo

- Alexander (2011)
- I vs I (2020)

== Awards and nominations ==
Association	Year	Category	Work	Result	Ref(s)
Golden Globe Awards	2014	Best Original Score	All Is Lost	Won	
Grammy Awards	2013	Best Long Form Music Video	Big Easy Express	Won	
Tony Awards	2018	Best Original Score	SpongeBob SquarePants	Nominated	
