= Another Man's Treasure =

Studio album by Ima Robot
- Released: 2010
- Recorded: 2006–2010
- Genre: Dance-punk
- Length: 46:10
- Label: Werewolf Heart Records
- Producer: Ima Robot

Ima Robot chronology
Search and Destroy EP (2006)	Another Man's Treasure (2010)

Another Man's Treasure is the third album by Ima Robot. It was released by Werewolf Heart Records on September 18, 2010. It was made available on iTunes, and listeners could purchase the album through the band's site, which offered several different editions and other items, including tote bags, bonus tracks and T-shirts. All orders, other than the digital download came with a downloadable copy of the band's 2006 EP Search and Destroy and four b-side tracks.

== Reception ==
Professional ratings
Review scores
Source	Rating
Allmusic	3.5/5 stars

The Allmusic review by Gregory Heaney awarded the album 3.5 stars stating "The interplay between the album's intro and "Ruthless" really reinforces this idea as the intro's wall of sound falls away, allowing the bright bassline to emerge like the first light of dawn, as if to say that this is a new beginning for Ebert and company. From that moment on, the album is in an entirely different headspace from anything the band has done previously, and while Ima Robot still have a tendency to borrow from other bands, they do so in a more interesting way than they have before. The druggy "Life Is Short" feels like some kind of lost collaboration between Ween and Animal Collective, combining goofy, faux reggae with synth atmospherics in a way that makes the artsy stuff feel less serious and the reggae grooves less tongue in cheek. It feels like the freedom and uncertainty of being independent again has been a real boon to Ima Robot. Another Man's Treasure feels like it was written by a band whose members no longer had anyone looking over their shoulders, allowing them to focus less on being the next big thing and more on starting over and doing something outside of their comfort zone, resulting in an album that will not only surprise old fans, but also anyone who passed on these guys the first time around. ".

Unlike their previous work, this had a more laid-back tempo, and focused on longer, more varied song structures throughout. It was given a 7.9/10.0 rating on indie reviews and a 3.0/5.0 rating on Some Kind of Awesome.

== Track listing ==
All tracks by Tim Anderson, Alex Ebert & Filip Nikolić

1. "One Man's Trash" - 0:50
2. "Ruthless" - 6:41
3. "Sail With Me" - 5:53
4. "Rough Night" - 6:41
5. "Life Is Short" - 6:09
6. "Pass It On" - 5:40
7. "Shine Shine" - 5:20
8. "Swell" - 8:58

=== B-side bonus tracks for orders from imarobot.com ===
1. "Greenback Boogie" (Note: "Greenback Boogie" is the theme song for the USA Network series "Suits".) - 4:58
2. "Victory" - 5:29
3. "Peru" - 4:54
4. "Life is Short" (Extended Ice Cream Truck Edit) - 8:11

== Personnel ==
- Alex Ebert "Edward Sharpe" - lead vocals
- Timmy "The Terror" Anderson - guitar
- Filip Nikolic "Turbotito" - bass guitar
- Jason "Computer Jay" Taylor - keyboards
- Jonas Petri Megyessi - guitar, percussion
- Orpheo McCord - drums

=== Guest musicians ===
- Scott Devours - drums
- Lukas Haas - wurlitzer
- Audrae Mae - backing vocals
- Lars Vognstrup - synthesizer, backing vocals
- William "Smitty" Smith - mallets

=== Technical personnel ===
- Sergio Chaves - engineer
- Stewart Cole - trumpet
- Pete Lyman - mastering
- Marcus Samperio - engineer
- Hama Sanders - photography
- Shiviah Silvah - assistant engineer
