= Charles Schepens =

Belgian-American ophthalmologist (1912–2006)

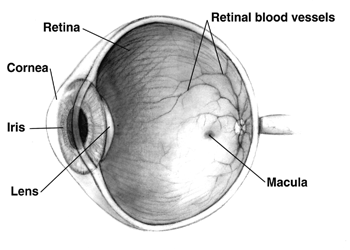
Human eye cross-sectional view. Courtesy NIH National Eye Institute.

Charles Louis Schepens (March 13, 1912 – March 28, 2006) was a Belgian and American ophthalmologist, regarded by many in the profession as "the father of modern retinal surgery", and member of the French Resistance.

== Early life: medical training and member of the French Resistance ==
Schepens was born in Mouscron, Belgium, in 1912; his father was a physician. He initially studied mathematics before graduating from medical school in 1935 at State University of Ghent in Belgium. Schepens then trained in ophthalmology at Moorfields Eye Hospital in London, England prior to World War II. After the Germans invaded Belgium in 1940, he became a medical officer in the Belgian Air Force.

After the fall of Belgium, Schepens escaped to France where he became active in the French Resistance smuggling documents and people over the Pyrenees to Spain during 1942 and 1943. Schepens was twice captured by the Gestapo. He worked under the alias of Jacques Perot, a lumber mill operator in the French Basque village of Mendive. Aware that the Germans had learned of the operation, he escaped to England.

== Ophthalmologist, retinal specialist, and inventor ==
After the war, Schepens resumed his medical career at Moorfields. In 1947, he immigrated to the United States and became a fellow at the Harvard Medical School. Schepens is credited for creating the vitreo-retinal subspecialty in ophthalmology. In 1949, he established the world's first retina service and first retinal disease fellowship at the Massachusetts Eye and Ear Infirmary. He founded a research laboratory for the investigation of retinal disease, the Retina Foundation, in 1950. Now known as the Schepens Eye Research Institute, it is affiliated with Harvard and the Massachusetts General Hospital. It has grown from 6 staff initially to 200 as of 2006, and at that time was the largest independent eye research organization in the United States. In 2011, the institute combined with the Massachusetts Eye and Ear Infirmary.

In 1967, Schepens founded The Retina Society and was its first president from 1968 to 1969.

Schepens invented the binocular indirect ophthalmoscope (BIO), which is routinely used to look at the retina. His original BIO is now in the collection of the Smithsonian Institution. It has been reported that Schepens assembled the prototype for his BIO from metal scraps collected from the streets of London during the German blitz. He was also a pioneer of surgical techniques such as scleral buckling for the repair of retinal detachments. The use of these techniques has raised the success of retinal reattachment surgery from 40% to 90%. During his career, Schepens wrote four books and over 340 research papers.

== Awards and recognition ==
In 1999, Schepens was chosen by the American Society of Cataract and Refractive Surgery as one of the ten most influential ophthalmologists of the century. The American Academy of Ophthalmology named him as one of their inaugural laureates in 2003 as recognition for his contribution to the field. In 2006, his earlier heroics were also rewarded when the consul general of France presented him the French Legion of Honour award for smuggling over 100 people from France into Spain.

His life's story has been told in Meg Ostrum's 2004 book, "The Surgeon and the Shepherd: Two Resistance Heroes in Vichy France". In 2006, Schepens died of a stroke at the age of 94.

In 2013, a biographical profile of Dr. Schepens was included in a bestselling book called Saving Sight: An eye surgeon's look at life behind the mask and the heroes who changed the way we see, by Andrew Lam (author), M.D.
