= Strange Wilderness =

- Theatrical release poster
- Directed by: Fred Wolf
- Written by: Peter Gaulke; Fred Wolf
- Produced by: Peter Gaulke
- Starring: Steve Zahn; Allen Covert; Jonah Hill; Kevin Heffernan; Ashley Scott; Peter Dante; Harry Hamlin; Robert Patrick; Joe Don Baker; Justin Long; Jeff Garlin; Ernest Borgnine
- Cinematography: David Hennings
- Edited by: Tom Costain
- Music by: Waddy Wachtel
- Production companies: Level 1 Entertainment; Happy Madison Productions
- Distributed by: Paramount Pictures (Note: Paramount did release the movie, but the logo isn't shown on the main film or on any trailers or TV spots, although the "distributed by" variant appears at the end of the film and on the poster credits.)
- Release date: February 1, 2008
- Running time: 85 minutes
- Country: United States
- Language: English
- Budget: $20 million
- Box office: $6.9 million

Strange Wilderness is a 2008 American adventure comedy film produced by Adam Sandler's production company Happy Madison Productions and distributed by Paramount Pictures. Directed by Fred Wolf (in his feature length directorial debut), who also co-wrote the film with Peter Gaulke, the film stars Steve Zahn, Allen Covert, Jonah Hill, Kevin Heffernan, Ashley Scott, Peter Dante, Harry Hamlin, Robert Patrick, Joe Don Baker, Justin Long, Jeff Garlin, and Ernest Borgnine. Production took place in 2005, but the film did not receive a theatrical release until February 1, 2008.

Strange Wilderness centers around the crew members of the titular fictional nature show heading to Ecuador to investigate a Bigfoot sighting in order to keep the show from being cancelled. The film was critically panned and was a box office bomb, making $6.9 million against a $20 million budget.

== Plot ==
Peter Gaulke hosts an unsuccessful nature program called Strange Wilderness, originally hosted by Peter's late father.

One day, Peter and his sidekick/soundman Fred Wolf are called to K-PIP, where they run into Sky Pierson, the host of a more successful wildlife show that is in the middle of a deal to transfer to K-PIP. Peter and Fred are told by network head Ed Lawson about the negative aspects of Strange Wilderness since the death of Peter's father, like low ratings, filming without a permit, poor content, inappropriate footage, referring to all indigenous peoples as pygmies aside from the littering, and bad things happening to people in footage, like an alligator attack on someone and a guy at a peace rally who was on fire. Unless something big happens, Strange Wilderness will be cancelled in two weeks.

Peter brainstorms ideas to keep Strange Wilderness on the air with Fred, equipment manager Lynn Cooker, driver Danny Gutierrez, camera man Junior, and his father's old friend/original cameraman Milas. Bill Calhoun, his dad's friend, brings him photos of Bigfoot hiding in Ecuador and a map to his cave. Pierson has offered $1,000 for the map. Unable to pay, Peter tells Bill he will have it in a week at his mountain cabin.

Peter, Fred, Lynn, Danny, and Junior start preparing for the long trip. They also bring in two more people: Whitaker, a former car mechanic now animal handler; and Cheryl, a travel agent.

Stopping to shoot footage of sea lions, Danny dresses up as a seal for better angles, gets attacked by a shark, and ends up hospitalized. Outside the hospital, Peter and Fred get into trouble with a local gang, get their front teeth knocked out, and have to go to a dentist. These incidents drain even more funds. After acquiring a tank of nitrous oxide from the dentist, they considered selling it to secure funds, except the canister leaked open on the RV, causing everyone to get high.

They arrive at Bill's cabin only to learn he already sold the map to Pierson. However, after witnessing a surveillance video of his wife cheating on him with Pierson, Bill makes a copy of the map from security cameras. He also enlists the help of renowned tracker Gus Hayden, but they can't pay him. While urinating in the bushes, Peter is attacked by a mother turkey, ending up with his penis inside its mouth. They rush him to a hospital to remove it from his penis. A wildlife ranger and a conservationist who "own" the turkey stop the doctor from cutting the turkey's head off, offering a $5,000 reward for the bird's return.

Continuing their journey, they arrive at the U.S. Mexico border where the Federales confiscate and chop down their RV while Peter undergoes a cavity search and the crew fly a plane the rest of the way. They eventually reach Ecuador. There, they meet Dick, an explorer and Bill's friend, who takes them to Gus Hayden.

The next morning, however, they wake up to find that Gus has left, stolen their equipment, and Cheryl is missing. Though hesitant, and with Peter unwilling to give up, Dick agrees to lead the group through the jungle. That night, Cheryl catches up with them and explains she saw Gus steal their equipment and pretended to run off with him so she could get the map back.

The next day while crossing the river, Dick is attacked and eaten by piranhas, and the crew catches the piranhas and eat them as payback, only to vomit them out, knowing they were eating Dick. Coming across Pierson's camp, they find that he and his team have been killed by the local pygmies. The group then gathers the equipment and eventually reaches Bigfoot's cave. While filming, a confused Bigfoot steps out and gets gunned down by the scared group. Not sure how to end the show in a good way later that night, Cooker comes up with the idea of showing Bigfoot committing suicide.

The surviving members return to the studio to show Lawson footage of them trying to resuscitate Bigfoot. Lawson berates them for their ridiculousness and cancels "Strange Wilderness." This leads to a fight within the group.

One year later, Peter gets a visit from Milas, who encourages him to revive Strange Wilderness. Peter gets everyone back together, and they make an episode about the shark attack using footage of them vomiting into the shark's mouth at the scene, as well as Danny getting his arm bitten by that shark. Peter and Fred show it to Lawson. Impressed by the footage, Lawson tells Pete that people love shark attacks. With Pierson dead, Lawson puts Strange Wilderness back on the air.

A postscript states that Strange Wilderness became successful again and dominated the 3:00 AM slot. Six months later, Peter's group searched for the Loch Ness Monster, where hilarity ensued in Scotland. They remain friends to this day.

== Cast ==
- Steve Zahn as Peter Gaulke, the host of Strange Wilderness who inherited the show after his father's death.
- Allen Covert as Fred Wolf, the soundman for Strange Wilderness and Peter's sidekick.
- Jonah Hill as Lynn Cooker, the equipment manager for Strange Wilderness.
- Kevin Heffernan as Whitaker, a former car mechanic that becomes the animal handler for Strange Wilderness.
- Ashley Scott as Cheryl, a travel agent that gets involved with Strange Wilderness.
- Peter Dante as Danny Gutierrez, the RV driver who was injured in a shark attack.
- Harry Hamlin as Sky Pierson, the successful host of a rival nature TV show.
- Robert Patrick as Gus Hayden, an animal tracker in Ecuador.
- Joe Don Baker as Bill Calhoun, an old friend of Peter's father who suffers from paranoia.
- Justin Long as Junior, a pot-headed camera man for Strange Wilderness and Milas's nephew.
- Jeff Garlin as Ed Lawson, the head of the TV studio K-PIP that broadcasts Strange Wilderness.
- Ernest Borgnine as Milas, an old friend of Peter's dad and the original camera man on Strange Wilderness. Mark Elliot was originally going to play Milas before Borgnine was cast.
- John Farley as a mountain doctor
- Oliver Hudson as TJ, an animal handler working for Sky Pierson.
- Blake Clark as Dick, an explorer who is friends with Gus and knows his way around the forest.
- Seth Rogen as the voice of a ranger in a helicopter who interrupts one of Peter's filming activities for Strange Wilderness because he did not have a permit to film in the forest.
- Kevin Alejandro as Hispanic Man #1
- Jake Abel as conservationist
- Jim Meskimen as Park Ranger Don, a park ranger who helps a conservationist (Jake Abel) find a missing turkey.
- David Mattey as Bigfoot, a Cryptid that was sighted in Ecuador.
- Jennifer Perks as Debra
- Meg Wolf as Judy, a K-PIP receptionist.
- Molly Wolf as Little Girl
- Bill Burrud as Peter Gaulke's father (archive footage)

== Release ==
Strange Wilderness was released on February 1, 2008, by Paramount Pictures. It grossed $3 million over its first weekend, placing in the 13th spot in the North American box office.

== Reception ==
On the review aggregator website Rotten Tomatoes, 2% of 48 critics' reviews are positive, with an average rating of 2.6/10. The website's consensus reads: "Strange Wilderness is a laugh-free comedy that's both aimless and overly crass." Metacritic, which uses a weighted average, assigned the film a score of 12 out of 100, based on 12 critics, indicating "overwhelming dislike". It is in 42nd place on the Metacritic list of the worst-reviewed films ever (with seven or more reviews).

Joe Leydon of Variety called the film "a slovenly, slapped-together stoner comedy". In his review for The New York Times, Matt Zoller Seitz wrote, "What rankles isn’t the gross-out humor or the verbal non sequiturs, which are expected, even welcome, in this sort of movie. It’s the smug sense of entitlement—that of intoxicated dweebs tittering endlessly and obnoxiously at their own supposed cleverness. Harold & Kumar Go to White Castle is the gold standard in this genre. Strange Wilderness is a counterfeit bill."
