= Bill Todman =

American TV producer (1916–1979)

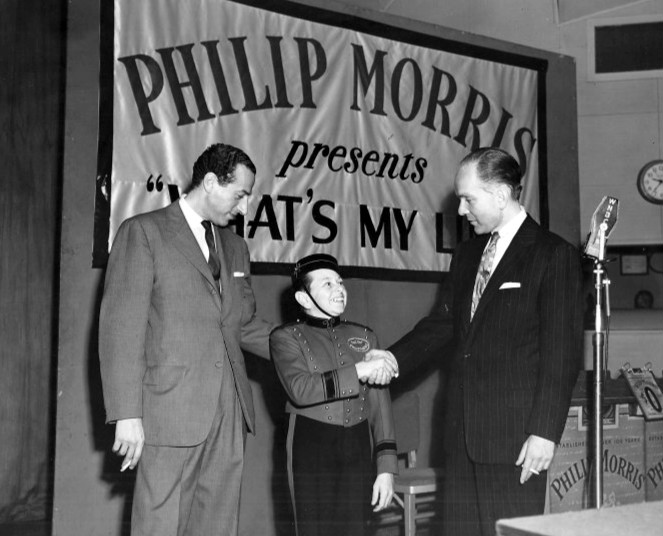
- Todman at left with Mark Goodson and Johnny Roventini for the radio version of What's My Line? in 1952
- Born: William Selden Todman; July 31, 1916; New York City, U.S.
- Died: July 29, 1979 (aged 62); New York City, U.S.
- Education: Johns Hopkins University (B.A.)
- Occupation: Television producer
- Years active: 1948–1979
- Known for: TV game shows and Goodson-Todman Productions
- Spouse: Frances Holmes Burson (m. 1950)
- Children: 2; including Bill Todman Jr.

William Selden Todman (July 31, 1916 – July 29, 1979) was an American television producer and personality born in New York City. He produced many of television's longest-running shows with business partner Mark Goodson, with whom he created Goodson-Todman Productions.

== Early life ==
Todman was born in New York City in 1916. He was originally named Wilbur Selden Todman, but later changed his name to William in honor of his late uncle. Todman was the son of a Wall Street accountant, Frederick S. Todman, CPA, whose accounting firm was known as Frederick S. Todman & Co. and for many years was located at 111 Broadway, downtown Manhattan. The firm represented some of the United States' biggest companies, including the New York Stock Exchange, American Stock Exchange, Polaroid, Eastman Kodak, and Chase Manhattan Bank. Frederick S. Todman lectured in post-World War II Japan as part of that country's economic reconstruction, and wrote several quintessential books on Wall Street Accounting. Bill Todman's brother, Howard, was vice president and treasurer for Goodson-Todman Productions.

In 1941, while working on the local quiz show, The Battle of the Boroughs, he met Mark Goodson, which at that time a local radio announcer. This was soldiifed into the Goodson-Todman partnership to start the radio hit Winner Take All.

== Game shows ==
Todman teamed up with Mark Goodson for radio shows. According to radio historian J. David Goldin, among their early work together was the show Treasury Salute, a program syndicated by the Treasury Department that honored military members. They later collaborated in producing game shows for radio, then moved into television, where they produced some of the longest-running game shows in history. Their many shows included Beat the Clock, Card Sharks, Family Feud, Match Game, Password, Tattletales, The Price Is Right, To Tell the Truth, and What's My Line?

Although both men created the programs (Bob Stewart created Password, The Price is Right & other shows that GTProd produced). Todman gradually became less involved with the day-to-day operations of the game-show business and moved Goodson-Todman into a bigger business strategy. Todman was responsible for diversifying Goodson-Todman into the newspaper, radio station, and real estate businesses. The television business was lucrative, but not nearly as much as the other businesses in which Todman invested, which earned millions. Goodson continued to work on game shows, while Todman expanded the company. Goodson-Todman likely would never have survived the roller coaster of the television business, including the slow period for game shows in the late 1960s, had Todman not been aggressive in expanding the company into other ventures.

== Death ==
Todman died on July 29, 1979, two days before his 63rd birthday, in New York City as a result of a heart condition. He was survived by his wife Frances Holmes Burson and two children: William Jr. and Lisa Todman Plough. He was buried at Mount Hope Cemetery in Hastings-on-Hudson, New York.

Goodson-Todman game shows that were still running at the time continued to be billed as "A Mark Goodson — Bill Todman Production". In the early 1980s, Mark Goodson acquired the Todman heirs' share of the company. Child's Play, which premiered in 1982, was the first show to be billed as simply "A Mark Goodson Television Production". The Goodson-Todman library of game shows is now part of FremantleMedia.

== Legacy ==
- Todman was inducted into the Television Academy Hall of Fame in 2011.
