= Grandma's Boy (2006 film) =

Film by Nicholaus Goossen

- Theatrical release poster
- Directed by: Nicholaus Goossen
- Written by: Barry Wernick; Allen Covert; Nick Swardson
- Produced by: Adam Sandler; Allen Covert
- Starring: Linda Cardellini; Allen Covert; Peter Dante; Shirley Jones; Shirley Knight; Joel David Moore; Kevin Nealon; Doris Roberts; Nick Swardson
- Cinematography: Mark Irwin
- Edited by: Tom Costain
- Music by: Waddy Wachtel
- Production companies: Level 1 Entertainment; Happy Madison Productions
- Distributed by: 20th Century Fox (United States, Canada, United Kingdom, Ireland, France and Italy); Summit Entertainment (International)
- Release date: January 6, 2006 (United States)
- Running time: 94 minutes
- Country: United States
- Language: English
- Budget: $5 million
- Box office: $6.6 million

Grandma's Boy is a 2006 American stoner comedy film directed by Nicholaus Goossen, written by Barry Wernick, Allen Covert and Nick Swardson, and starring Linda Cardellini, Covert, Peter Dante, Shirley Jones, Shirley Knight, Joel David Moore, Kevin Nealon, Doris Roberts, and Swardson. The film features a video game tester who is forced to move in with his grandmother after being evicted from his home while falling for a woman who was sent to oversee the production of his video game company's newest video game.

Grandma's Boy was released on January 6, 2006 by 20th Century Fox in the United States, Canada, United Kingdom, Ireland, France and Italy, with Summit Entertainment releasing in other territories. The film received negative reviews from critics and grossed $6.6 million against a $5 million budget.

== Plot ==
Alex is a single, 36-year-old video game tester who lives with his friend Josh. When Josh wastes their rent money on Filipino prostitutes, their landlord Yuri evicts them, purposely breaks one of their bongs, and has his movers trash everything the evictees don't collect, forcing Alex to find a new place to live.

Alex tries to stay with his marijuana dealer Dante, but cannot do so because Dante is adopting a wild lion to live in the house. Alex spends one night with his co-worker Jeff, but Jeff still lives with his parents. After an embarrassing incident with Jeff's mother in which he is caught masturbating in the bathroom and subsequently ejaculates on her, she still allows Alex to stay with them, but he instead takes the option of moving in with his grandmother Lilly and her two eccentric friends Bea and Grace.

Alex is given many chores and fix-up projects to do around the house, but has a hard time completing them because his grandmother and her friends are a constant distraction. He also finds it hard to get any work done for the game company he works at, Brainasium. After borrowing an illegal cable box from Dante so that he can get cable TV, Alex discovers that the three women have a fascination with the television program Antiques Roadshow and later is able to get some work finished by giving them tickets to attend a taping of the show.

At work, Alex meets the beautiful Samantha, who has been sent by the company's corporate office to oversee the production of a new video game called Eternal Deathslayer III. Alex and Samantha hit it off, but the only person in the way of their relationship is the prodigal creator of the game they are all working on, J.P., a self-proclaimed "genius" who is obsessed with video games, talks like a robot, and has a crush on Samantha. Sam on the other hand, is not interested in J.P. and declines his constant advances.

Meanwhile, in an attempt to sound cool to his younger co-workers, Alex says that he is living "with three hot babes". Alex's friends believe the lie and actually think the reason he is so tired every day at work is because he is living with three women who constantly "wear him out" in the bedroom. The real cause of his fatigue is the chores that he has to do. Also, he's working on his own video game called Demonik which he has been developing in secret for some time. Lilly asks about the game one night and he teaches her to play it. To his surprise, she becomes quite good at it and beats many levels.

After Alex and his co-workers finish successfully testing J.P.'s new game, their boss Mr. Cheezle tells Samantha to take the boys out to eat at a vegan restaurant, but they instead make fun of the restaurant and their waiter Shilo when they arrive, and then leave to a burger shop. When Jeff has to use the bathroom and refuses to use the one in the restaurant, Alex is forced to take everyone to his house.

Alex comes home to find that Lilly, Grace, and Bea drank all of his pot, which they thought was tea left by their late friend. When Samantha admits to smoking weed too, Alex calls up Dante and throws a wild party. During the party, Jeff hooks up with Grace and the group prank-calls J.P., in which they leave him a voicemail that makes fun of him about wanting to be a robot. J.P. is upset by the message, and after learning that Sam and Alex were together, he shows up at Lilly's house a couple nights later in tears. Alex sympathizes with him, and when J.P. noticed and played Alex's game Demonik, he agrees to let him borrow his only copy of the game and test it out for a few days.

In retaliation for Alex making his life miserable, and having become accustomed to stealing others' ideas, J.P. steals the game and tries to pass it off as his own at work. Alex protests, proclaiming it was his game. With the lack of evidence and Cheezle siding with J.P., Alex quit and stormed off to Dante's where they got high on his product, during which Dante replaced his lion with a monkey trained in kung fu. Sam approached Lilly to find Alex and learned that Lilly knows about the game and Alex was contacted about the proof that came to light. At Brainasium, Lilly plays J.P. to prove J.P. a fraud, and wins after enabling a code that J.P. did not know.

Cheezle sends J.P. home while Alex is vindicated and creates a successful game. Six months later, Alex and Samantha start dating and Demonik has hit stores everywhere and everyone is celebrating at Dante's place.

== Cast ==
- Allen Covert as Alex, a video game tester and designer.
- Linda Cardellini as Samantha, a woman sent to oversee the development of a video game who Alex falls for.
- Doris Roberts as Grandma Lilly, Alex's grandmother.
- Shirley Jones as Grace, a friend of Lilly who lives with her.
- Shirley Knight as Bea, a friend of Lilly who lives with her.
- Peter Dante as Dante Spirou, a marijuana dealer.
- Nick Swardson as Jeff, Alex's co-worker.
- Joel David Moore as J.P., a video game designer and self-proclaimed genius who is Alex's rival.
- Kevin Nealon as Mr. Simon Cheezle, the boss of Alex.
- Jonah Hill as Barry, a younger co-worker of Alex.
- Kelvin Yu as Kane, a younger co-worker of Alex.
- Chuck Church as Dan
- Jonathan Loughran as Josh, a friend and former roommate of Alex.
- Scott Halberstadt as Bobby
- Rob Schneider as Yuri, a Russian landlord who evicts Alex and Josh.
- David Spade as Shiloh, a waiter at a vegan restaurant.
- Randal Reeder as Biker
- Abdoulaye N'Gom as Dr. Shakalu
- Todd Holland and Kevin Nash as two unnamed movers who work for Yuri.
- Ted Stryker as the restaurant host of a vegan restaurant.
- Harry the Chimp as Dante's pet chimpanzee

== Production ==
Principal photography took place at Los Angeles Center Studios, and locations in the vicinity.

Game developer Terminal Reality was involved in the film's production, lending footage to promote their game Demonik. Although the game was cancelled before the film's release, the footage remained in the final cut.

== Release ==
=== Box office ===
Grandma's Boy opened theatrically on January 6, 2006, in 2,015 venues and earned $3,009,341 in its opening weekend, ranking thirteenth in the domestic box office and second among that weekend's newcomers. The film ended its run seven weeks later on February 23, having grossed $6,090,172 domestically and $476,105 internationally for a worldwide total of $6,566,277.

=== Critical reception ===
On Rotten Tomatoes, Grandma's Boy has an approval rating of 15% based on reviews from 60 critics, with an average rating of 3.60/10. The site's consensus states: "A gross-out comedy that's more gross than comedic, Grandma's Boy is lazy and unrewarding." Metacritic reports a 33 out of 100 rating based on 15 critics, indicating "generally unfavorable" reviews. Audience polling company CinemaScore reported that the average grade cinema audiences gave the film was a "B" on an A+ to F scale.

Ronnie Scheib of Variety magazine wrote: "Even Sandler diehards may pass on this mostly derivative paean to compulsive computer geekdom and male sexual dysfunction."

=== Accolades ===
The film won several honors in High Times' 2006 Stony Awards, including "Best Stoner Movie", "Best Actor in a Movie" (Allen Covert), and "Best Pot Scene in a Movie".

== Home media ==
Grandma's Boy was released on DVD on May 9, 2006, by 20th Century Fox Home Entertainment, with both the theatrical (94 minutes) and unrated (95 minutes) versions. The film grossed $35 million in DVD sales in the United States, plus more for rentals and television revenue.

In a December 2022 interview with the Stiff Socks podcast, Nick Swardson tells of he and Adam Sandler meeting the then-CEO of Blockbuster in the late 2010s, who told them that Grandma's Boy was "one of their most stolen movies of all time, because nobody ... returned the movie, EVER!".

== Soundtrack ==
The soundtrack includes tracks of the film's dialogue between the musical tracks.

Track #	Title	Artist	Time
2	"Another Day"	The Twenty Twos	2:40
4	"Helicopter"	Bloc Party	3:39
5	"Meantime"	The Futureheads	2:49
7	"Spinnin'"	Zion I	3:25
9	"Little Girl"	The Daylights	3:16
10	"Never Win"	Fischerspooner	3:59
12	"Sittin' Sidewayz"	Paul Wall/Big Pokey	3:48
14	"Alive and Amplified"	The Mooney Suzuki	3:05
15	"Can't Kick the Habit"	Spin Doctors	8:12
17	"Night on Fire"	VHS or Beta	4:01
18	"Anyone"	Moving Units	3:57
20	"Windowlicker"	Aphex Twin	6:04
21	"STD Dance"	Ima Robot	4:35
23	"Grandma's Boyee"	Kool Keith/KutMasta Kurt	4:09

Other music

Music from the film that were not found on the soundtrack includes:

- "Dance to the Underground" – Radio 4
- "Natural Disaster" – Fischerspooner (J.P.'s entrance)
- "A Fair Resort" – Cdoass
- "Call the Cops" – Dr. Dooom
- "Hit Me Again" – Neon
- "Make a Jam!" – U1 (Dance Dance Revolution (Ultramix 2) scene)
- "Dead End" – N & S (Dance Dance Revolution (Ultramix 2) scene)
- "Can I Buy U a Drink" – Kool Keith / KutMasta Kurt
- "Talk Dirty to Me" – Poison
- "Push It" – Linda Cardellini (originally by Salt 'N Pepa)
- "Holla" – Mista Wizard / Guy Boogie
- "Headlines" – Neon Blonde
- "Technology" – Evil Nine
- "Apartment 223" – Dr. Dooom
- "Happy" – Fischerspooner
- "I Don't Want to Know..." – The Donnas (trailer)
