= Ima Robot (album) =

Studio album by Ima Robot
- Released: September 16, 2003
- Genre: Dance-punk, indie rock, garage rock revival
- Length: 39:12
- Label: Virgin Records

Ima Robot chronology
Public Access EP (2003)	Ima Robot (2003)	Song #1 EP (2003)

Professional ratings
Review scores
Source	Rating
AllMusic	3/5 stars

Ima Robot is the first full-length album by Ima Robot. It was released on Virgin Records in 2003.

== Track listing ==
All tracks written by Alex Ebert.

1. "Dynomite" – 2:22
2. "Song #1" – 2:27
3. "Alive" – 3:12
4. "Scream" – 3:51
5. "A Is for Action" – 2:21
6. "Dirty Life" – 3:42
7. "Let's Talk Turkey" – 3:08
8. "Philosophofee" – 3:16
9. "12=3 (Here Come the Doctors)" – 3:10
10. "Here Come the Bombs" – 2:39
11. "What Are We Made From?" – 9:05 (4:48 on Japanese release)
12. "I'm Your Bitch" – 4:23 (Japanese release)
13. "Strangler's Theme" – 9:27 (Japanese release)

The hidden track "Black Jettas" is appended to the last song after a period of silence on both the UK, American and Japanese releases.

The recording sessions for this album also resulted in numerous B-Sides. The total amount of songs recorded by the band for the album is around 30. Some of these songs are still lost/not released to the public. Officially released B-Sides include:

- "STD Dance"
- "Ages of Ruin"
- "Sine Your Life Away"
- "Sex Symbols on Parade"
- "The Beat Goes On"
- "10:10" (also known as "Sexy")

Unofficially released B-Sides include:
- "Spearmint Whino"
- "Twist & Shout"
- "Leo's Waltz"

Lost songs that are confirmed to exist include:
- "Chip off the Block" (Different from the versions that appear on the 2001 Demo CD and the 2006 album Monument to the Masses)
- "New Negatives"

Tracks that are theorized to be recorded during these sessions include:
- "Apples"
- "Dragons and Queens"
- "Ancient Sluts"

== Personnel ==
- Alex Ebert — lead vocals
- Tim Anderson — guitars, backing vocals
- Oliver Goldstein — keyboards, guitars, percussion
- Justin Meldal-Johnsen — bass, backing vocals
- Joey Waronker — drums, backing vocals, percussion

== In other media ==
- "A Is for Action" was featured in the video game SSX 3.
- "Scream" was featured in episode 4 of season 4 of the US drama series Queer as Folk.
