= Nick Swardson =

American comedian & actor (born 1976)

- Swardson in 2026
- Born: Nicholas Roger Swardson; October 9, 1976 (age 50); Minneapolis, Minnesota, U.S.
- Occupations: Stand-up comedian; actor; screenwriter; producer
- Years active: 1995–present
- Website: nickswardson.net

Nicholas Roger Swardson (born October 9, 1976) is an American actor, stand-up comedian, screenwriter, and producer. He is best known for his recurring role as Terry Bernadino in the comedy series Reno 911! (2003–2009), for his work with Adam Sandler's Happy Madison Productions, and for his own personal sketch comedy series Nick Swardson's Pretend Time (2010–2011).

He starred as the title character in Bucky Larson: Born to Be a Star (2011), and has appeared in the films Grandma's Boy (2006), I Now Pronounce You Chuck & Larry (2007), The House Bunny, (2008), Just Go With It, 30 Minutes or Less (both 2011), Grown Ups 2 (2013), The Ridiculous 6 (2015), Sandy Wexler (2017), Airplane Mode (2019), and Happy Gilmore 2 (2025).

== Early life ==
A native of the Minneapolis–Saint Paul area, Swardson was born to Pamela and Roger Eric Swardson, and is the youngest of three siblings; he has a sister, Rachel, and a brother, John. His father was an editor and journalist—having written for publications such as the Cincinnati Enquirer and City Pages, as well as founding the Grand Gazette, a former Saint Paul community newspaper. Roger Swardson also invested in land development in Saint Paul, revitalizing Grand Avenue, an area now known as Victoria Crossing. Swardson's parents divorced when he was about 12 or 13. Swardson has Swedish ancestry.

He attended St. Paul Central High School and started acting and performing improv comedy at age 16. A mischievous student who struggled with alcohol and drugs, Swardson was expelled from school on four occasions for pulling fire alarms in order to go outside and smoke cigarettes, fighting, posting a lewd sign in class, and for smoking marijuana; he was enrolled in a rehab program while still in school.

After graduating in 1996, Swardson decided to pursue stand-up comedy rather than attend college. Although Swardson was a fan of sketch comedy, he saw stand-up comedy as a stepping stone to a career in film, more so than he would working within a comedy troupe.

Swardson is an avid Minnesota Vikings fan. He is also good friends with fellow Minnesota resident Josh Duhamel.

== Career ==
Swardson started performing stand-up at the age of 18, attending open mic nights at the Minneapolis comedy club Acme Comedy Co. Swardson stated in a 2007 interview with The Portland Mercury that he did his first open mic "as a goof" but he was encouraged by the club owner to perform again and he went on to win the comedy club's award for the "Funniest Person in the Twin Cities". He also went on to perform regularly at Knuckleheads, a defunct comedy club which was located in the Mall of America. Swardson was also an occasional performer at Balls Cabaret.

After garnering some attention within comedy circles, Swardson was selected to perform stand-up at the U.S. Comedy Arts Festival at 20 years of age. The festival, which up to 2007 was held in Aspen, Colorado, was a yearly festival attended by entertainment insiders and was a place for comics and comedic actors to get exposure to the industry. It was once the largest comedy convention of its kind in the US and became the launch pad for many comedians and comedy writers. After Swardson's first performance at the festival comedian Tony Camin, acting as the night's MC, was quoted as saying: "There's a deal waiting to happen. I can see the TV show now: 'An Aspen Kid With Altitude.'"

Swardson eventually left the Minneapolis–Saint Paul area for New York City where he would appear in such venues as the Luna Lounge, then on to Los Angeles where he headlined at many nightclubs. In addition to his stand-up, Swardson began to get work in commercials and in small roles in both TV and film, such as an appearance in an episode of the Al Franken sitcom LateLine in 1999, and playing the role of a crazed David Bowie fan in the 2000 film Almost Famous.

In 2001, Swardson's stand-up act was featured in a half-hour Comedy Central Presents special. He appeared on the show a second time in 2006 — a performance that was featured on the DVD compilation The Best of Comedy Central Presents: Uncensored II released in 2008.

In 2003, Swardson co-wrote the screenplay for Malibu's Most Wanted along with the film's star Jamie Kennedy and Adam Small. That same year he took on the role of Terry Bernadino on the Comedy Central series Reno 911!. A recurring character throughout the series' run from 2003 to 2009 — in addition to appearing in the film Reno 911!: Miami — Swardson played the role of a flamboyant gigolo who was often seen wearing roller skates. 2003 also marked the beginning of a longtime working relationship and friendship with Adam Sandler. After having seen Swardson's Comedy Central special, Sandler contacted Swardson to ask if he would be interested in collaborating; Swardson's first project with Sandler was co-writing the screenplay for Grandma's Boy — Swardson also co-produced and had an acting role in the film which was released in 2006.

In 2004, Swardson wrote, produced and starred in a TV show pilot for Comedy Central called Gay Robot, which was based on a comedy bit by the same name that appeared on Adam Sandler's fifth album, Shh...Don't Tell; Comedy Central, however, decided to pass on the TV project. Swardson then had intentions on making it an animated show, but the show never came to fruition. A copy of the live-action pilot was however made available on MySpace in January 2007. Swardson also resurrected the Gay Robot character on his Comedy Central Series Nick Swardson's Pretend Time.

Swardson's sketch comedy show Nick Swardson's Pretend Time, premiered on Comedy Central on October 12, 2010, and ran for two seasons. The show was produced in conjunction with Adam Sandler's Happy Madison Productions. On February 6, 2012, Swardson announced via his Facebook page that there would not be a third season; in his post Swardson stated that "the ratings were solid but it was too expensive for the network and tough creatively," and added that he was "developing a new show where I play a ninja."

In 2011, Swardson starred in, co-wrote and co-produced the film Bucky Larson: Born to Be a Star, also produced by Happy Madison Productions. That same year he starred alongside Jesse Eisenberg, Danny McBride and Aziz Ansari in the film 30 Minutes or Less.

In 2014, Swardson performed the voice of the character Troy on the animated series Chozen.

In 2024, Swardson was performing stand-up when he was repeatedly booed and the crowd became restless with his performance. Swardson's mic was eventually cut, spotlight turned off, and was escorted off the stage by staff. In response to the performance Swardson posted on X, "Just casually woke up on TMZ. Travel tip: don't drink and take edibles in high altitude. Fucking brain diarrhea."

== Filmography ==
=== Film ===
Year	Title	Role	Notes
2000	Almost Famous	Insane Bowie Fan	
2001	Pretty When You Cry	Shaun	
2003	Malibu's Most Wanted	Mocha	Also writer
2006	Grandma's Boy	Jeff	Also writer
2006	Art School Confidential	Matthew	
2006	The Benchwarmers	Howie Goodman	Also writer
2006	Click	Bed Bath & Beyond Guy	
2007	Reno 911!: Miami	Terry Bernadino	
2007	Blades of Glory	Hector	
2007	I Now Pronounce You Chuck and Larry	Kevin McDonough	
2008	You Don't Mess with the Zohan	Michael	
2008	The House Bunny	Photographer	
2008	Bolt	Blake	Voice only
2008	Bedtime Stories	Engineer	
2011	Just Go with It	Eddie	
2011	Bucky Larson: Born to Be a Star	Bucky Larson	Also writer
2011	30 Minutes or Less	Travis	
2011	Jack and Jill	Todd	
2012	That's My Boy	Kenny	
2013	A Haunted House	Chip the Psychic	
2013	Grown Ups 2	Nick	
2014	Back in the Day	Ron Freeman	
2015	Pixels	Pac-Man Victim	Uncredited
2015	Hotel Transylvania 2	Kelsey	Voice only
2015	Hell and Back	Remy	Voice only
2015	The Ridiculous 6	Nelly Patch	
2016	The Do-Over	Bob	
2017	Sandy Wexler	Gary Rodgers	
2019	Buddy Games	Bender	
2019	Airplane Mode	Esteban	
2020	The Wrong Missy	Nate	
2023	Buddy Games: Spring Awakening	Bender	
2023	Leo	Bunny	Voice only
2025	Happy Gilmore 2	Ben Daggett	
2026	Remain Calm	Erwin	
TBA	Complex, Texas		Post-production
TBA	Mini War	Darren	Also writer; post-production

=== Television ===
Year	Title	Role	Notes
1999	LateLine	Justin	Episode: "Karp's Night Out"
2002	Watching Ellie	Young Guy	Episode: "Cheetos"
2003–2009	Reno 911!	Terry Bernadino	28 episodes
2004	Cheap Seats	Nicholas Jenner	Episode: "1978 Superstars"
2006	Gay Robot	Rick / Gay Robot	Also writer Television film
2007	Human Giant	Rob's Agent	Episode: "Lil 9-11"
2007	Cavemen	Ray	2 episodes
2008	According to Jim	Waiter	Uncredited; Episode: "The Chaperone"
2010–2011	Nick Swardson's Pretend Time	Various	Also writer 15 episodes
2012	The High Fructose Adventures of Annoying Orange	Jittery Guy / Jason Jr. (voices)	2 episodes
2014	Chozen	Troy	10 episodes
2014	Portlandia	Nick	Episode: "Late in Life Drug Use"
2014–2016	TripTank	Beth / Massage Guy / Killer Bee 1	9 episodes
2015	The Goldbergs	Rick Lancer	Episode: "Happy Mom, Happy Life"
2015	Comedy Bang! Bang!	Billy	Episode: "Michelle Monaghan Wears a Burnt Orange Dress and White Heels"
2015–17, 2019	Star vs. the Forces of Evil	Sensei Brantley	10 episodes
2016–2017	Typical Rick	Gary	Also creator
2017	Lip Sync Battle	Himself	Episode: "Nick Swardson vs. Theresa Caputo"
2025	It's Florida, Man	Bad Chad	Episode: "Pizza Man"

== Discography ==
- Gay Robot by Adam Sandler (2004)
- Calling Home by Adam Sandler (2004)
- Party (2007) (Stand-Up)
- Seriously, Who Farted? (2009) (Stand-Up)
