= Ima Robot =

American band

- Origin: Los Angeles, California, U.S.
- Genres: Dance rock, art rock, art pop, psychedelic rock
- Years active: 1998–present
- Labels: Virgin/EMI Records; Werewolf Heart Records
- Members: Alex "Edward Sharpe" Ebert; Timmy "the Terror" Anderson; Filip "Turbotito" Nikolić; Jason "ComputerJay" Taylor; Jonas Petri Megyessi; Orpheo McCord
- Website: imarobot.com/anothermanstreasure/

Ima Robot is an American band based in Los Angeles, California, that formed in the late 1990s. They have released several albums, EPs, and singles, most notably Ima Robot in 2003, Search and Destroy and Monument to the Masses in 2006, and Another Man's Treasure in 2010. The band's song "Greenback Boogie", a B-side to Another Man's Treasure, was the main theme song of the USA Network legal drama series Suits (2011–2019).

== History ==
In the 1990s, singer/rapper Alex Ebert and guitarist Tim "Timmy the Terror" Anderson worked together under various names including 13's Lucky, The Window Club, and Eiffel Tower Window Masters before deciding on the band name Ima Robot. The phrase "Ima Robot" came from an inside joke between members of the band, which Ebert has stated "was something that we thought was really, really, really, really funny, and I can't, for the life of me, remember why." In 1997, the duo recruited keyboardist/bassist Oliver "Oligee" Goldstein. The trio would perform with various frequently changing members until they recruited drummer Rich Lambert in December 2000 and bassist Justin Meldal-Johnsen in November 2001. The band recorded numerous untitled demo CDs through the late 90s and early 2000s.

=== Signing with Virgin Records ===
In mid- to late-2002, Ima Robot was signed to Virgin Records. As Ebert described, the first thing Virgin Records Chairman/CEO said about the band: "The first thing Matt Serletic said was that seeing us was like seeing the Ramones for the first time, and that he felt this kind of energy that we needed to capture and not try to gloss and glean over." Lambert was let go the day after the band was signed and was replaced by studio drummer Joey Waronker.

=== Ima Robot ===
On September 16, 2003, Ima Robot released their first full-length album, the self-titled Ima Robot. The album featured the singles "Dynomite" and "Song #1" (released in the UK only).

In 2004, Waronker and "Oligee" left the band. Meldal-Johnsen followed in 2005, with former Oleander drummer Scott Devours. Tim Anderson's cousin, whom he had never met before Devours, auditioned and took over the drums. Filip Nikolić took over the bass and Andy Marlow started playing the keyboards.

=== Search and Destroy ===
In the process of writing their second album, the band put together the EP "Search and Destroy", which they released and distributed independently at shows starting on April 5, 2006. The songs it contained were covertly written by Alex, Tim, Filip and Justin behind closed doors while the second album was in production.

The CD contained an insert with a note from the lead vocalist, Alex Ebert, which revealed the purpose of the EP while remaining carefully laced in metaphors:

I want to explain something to you all. We cannot stop making music - we are addicted. That it has been nearly TWO YEARS since we have released any does not refute this! For our upcoming Virgin Records release we wrote over one hundred songs. This is not to brag - I'm sure my Robot brethren wish sometimes, as I do, that we were not like this, that we did not suffer from this terribly prolific affliction! Yet contractually we are allowed only to release what the suits see fit! And what are we to DO with such a plethora of sitting music? HOARD it to ourselves!? How CRUEL and USUAL! Yes, but that's what those who unwittingly seek to oppress us would have us do!

BUT WE CANNOT KEEP THIS MUSIC TO OURSELVES ANY LONGER!

You see, SHARING is what life is all about. When you bite into a tastey piece of Al Pastor or Carne Asada, you WANT other people to taste it too! You may not give them a bite of YOUR burrito, but you will almost certainly emplore them to purchase one for themselves. This is the fundamental catalyst of Human intimacy, and as Human intimacy has been proven a biological imperative, let us name this fundamental catalyst The Al Pastor Imperative. (Not that Al Pastor itself, is the catalyst, you understand - it's just a good example...)

So you see, despite the despot's constraints and commands, we CANNOT submit!

Indeed, under the Al Pastor Imperative, we have a biological demand put upon us by Nature herself to SHARE our MUSIC with YOU!

And so this letter's intentions are twofold: one - to share with you, our beloved audience, the intimate details of our artistic natures, and two - to make IMA ROBOT'S case against any and all lawsuits that IMA ROBOT'S "owners" may consider against IMA ROBOT for releasing this "extra", "superfluous", "un-commercial", "artsy", "quirky", "no-hook" music to IMA ROBOT'S beloved LISTENERS.

To re-cap: IMA ROBOT, acting under the Al Pastor Imperative and by the decree of the Great Dictator herself - Mother Nature - whose authority supercedes [sic] any Earthly edicts or federally-sanctioned agreements, and whose overriding authority OBLIGES us to share this music with you, is hereby sheltered from any Earthly reproach!

So please enjoy this very special music that we have made all on our own, in our own houses, especially to share with YOU.

With very much love,

Alex

The song "Sing Boy" is an example of Ebert's self-reflective mantras throughout his songwriting in the band, and dives into the theme that their time being signed was undesired and restrictive of their creative freedom.

=== Monument to the Masses ===
On September 12, 2006, they released their second album Monument to the Masses, which featured the singles "Creeps Me Out" and "Lovers in Captivity".

The record contains 12 songs which further dive into self-reflection, with tracks such as "Pouring Pain" and "Happy Annie". To further lean into this, the song "Chip Off the Block" was a reprise of a song the band had written more than 5 years prior, and acted as a reflective piece to their more prolific earlier days writing music.

Alex Ebert is not credited by name in the album's included booklet main credits page. Instead of this, he uses the moniker "Edward Sharpe."

=== Departure from Virgin Records and post-departure ===
In April 2007, the band finally won their independence from Virgin Records and continued to work unsigned under the management of Alexis Rivera of Echo Park Records. The song "Gangster" premiered on the band's MySpace on April 15, 2008, with its lyrics posted in a blog entry by the band. In 2010 the band announced the upcoming release of their new album, Another Man's Treasure, and released the song "Ruthless" on the Internet.

Ebert remained frustrated with Virgin, saying in a 2016 interview with Transverso Media that, "pretty unironically I ended up feeling like a robot by the end of the process because of the major label thing." During that period, they were being represented by the Werewolf Heart label.

In June 2008, Lars Vognstrup joined the group, having previously played with Nikolić in the band Junior Senior. In 2009, Orpheo McCord (of Edward Sharpe and the Magnetic Zeros and of Fool's Gold), Jason "ComputerJay" Taylor, and Jonas Petri Megyessi joined the band.

On January 6, 2011, the band played six songs live on KCRW's Morning Becomes Eclectic. This was the first time since Monument to the Masses tours that the new band lineup had played live. Ima Robot's B-side "Greenback Boogie" from the album Another Man's Treasure was featured as the theme song of the USA Network legal drama, Suits, for its full duration from 2011 to 2019.

The band has been inactive since 2011 as its members have been busy with side projects. Alex Ebert has stated that he is "still in Ima Robot."

On March 28, 2025, Ima Robot released a deluxe edition of Another Man's Treasure, featuring the previously unreleased songs "I Don't Know in French", "Gangster", and "Peru". Later that year, on October 22, the band announced that their 2006 EP Search and Destroy would be receiving an official re-release on digital platforms and vinyl on November 14.

== Band members ==
=== Current ===
- Alex Ebert – lead vocals (1998–present)
- Timmy "The Terror" Anderson – guitar (1998–present)
- Filip "Turbotito" Nikolić – bass guitar (2004–present)
- Jason "One Three/Computer Jay" Taylor – keyboards (2001, 2009–present)
- Jonas Petri Megyessi – guitar, percussion (2009–present)
- Orpheo McCord – drums (2009–present)

=== Past ===
- Rich Lambert – drums (2000–2002)
- Joey Waronker – drums (2003–2004)
- Oliver "Oligee" Goldstein – keyboard, guitar (1998–2004)
- Justin Meldal-Johnsen – bass guitar (2001–2004)
- Scott Devours – drums (2005–2009)
- Andy Marlow – keyboards, (2005–2008)
- Lars Vognstrup – keyboards, (2008–2009)

== Discography ==
=== Studio albums ===
- Untitled Demo Album (1999)
- Ima Robot (September 16, 2003)
- Monument to the Masses (September 12, 2006)
- Another Man's Treasure (October 19, 2010)

=== EPs ===
- Various Untitled Demo CDs (199?-2002)
- "Black Jettas" (LP) (June 19, 2003)
- "Public Access EP" (CD/LP) (June 20, 2003)
- "Song #1" (EP) – (March 22, 2004)
- "Alive" (EP) – (2004) – Radio Only
- "Search And Destroy" (EP) (2006) – Sold only at shows originally and came free with the purchase of "Another Man's Treasure" from the band's website in 2010.

=== Singles ===
- "Dynomite" (Maxi Single) (CD/LP) (September 2003)
- "Creeps Me Out" (June 13, 2006) – Digital Only
- "Gangster" (April 15, 2008) – Digital Only
- "Ruthless" (June 2010) – Digital Only
