= Mark Noseworthy =

Canadian musician

- Born: London, Ontario, Canada
- Genres: Indie rock; psychedelic folk; avant-funk; krautrock; post-punk
- Occupations: Musician; Composer; Songwriter; Producer; Mixer
- Instruments: Vocals; guitar; bass; keyboards; saxophone; drums
- Years active: 2006–present
- Label: Temper

Mark Noseworthy is a Canadian musician and composer based in Los Angeles. He was formerly a member of Edward Sharpe and the Magnetic Zeros, and has a solo project called Terri Terri. He is also a composer for television and film, including I'm Dying Up Here on Showtime.

== Career ==
Noseworthy was born in London, Ontario. He joined Edward Sharpe and the Magnetic Zeros as a guitarist and vocalist in 2009. He played guitars on Alex Ebert's score for the 2013 film All Is Lost, which won the Golden Globe Award for Best Original Score. He was a member of Pete Yorn's touring lineup, and the guitarist for Albert Hammond Jr. He and Shanee Pink started the neo-folk group Pink & Noseworthy, releasing the 2006 self-titled debut and the 2009 album Twice.

In December 2017, he released "Attention", the first single under his solo project Terri Terri. Terri Terri's self-titled debut album was released on February 6, 2018. In 2020, Terri Terri released the single "Good Circulation", and in 2021 released the single "Lovers in No Time", with additional vocals from Odessa Jorgensen.

== Discography ==
=== Terri Terri ===
==== Albums ====
Title	Release details
Terri Terri	Released: February 6, 2018; Label: Temper Records; Formats: Digital download

==== Singles ====
- "Attention" (2017)
- "Human Contact" (2018)
- "Leaving" (2018)
- "I Am the Sand" (2019)
- "Don't Make It Right" (2019)
- "Good Circulation" (2020)
- "Lovers in No Time" (2021)

=== Pink & Noseworthy ===
==== Albums ====
Title	Release details
Pink & Noseworthy	Released: May 8, 2006; Label: North Street Records; Formats: CD, digital download
Twice	Released: August 11, 2009; Label: North Street Records; Formats: CD, digital download

=== TV and film scores ===
- God Went Surfing with the Devil (2010)
- 3 Nights in the Desert (2014)
- Asthma (2014)
- Sequoia (2014)
- Dean (2016)
- I'm Dying Up Here (seasons 1 and 2, 2017–18)
- Eternity's Sunrise: The Life of Carmen Cicero (2019)

=== As performer ===
Year	Artist(s)	Album	Role
2009	Fool's Gold	Fool's Gold	Saxophone, vocals, band member
2009	Various Artists	Julie & Julia (score)	Guitar, composer
2012	Edward Sharpe and the Magnetic Zeros	Here	Guitars, charango, ronrocco, banjo, vocals, composer, band member
2013	Alex Ebert	All Is Lost (score)	Guitars, banjo
2013	Boardwalk	Boardwalk	Guitars, bass
2013	Edward Sharpe and the Magnetic Zeros	Edward Sharpe and the Magnetic Zeros	Guitars, banjo, mandolin, vocals, composer, band member
2013	He's My Brother She's My Sister	Nobody Dances in This Town	Guitar
2014	Minnie Driver	Ask Me to Dance	Guitars, vocals
2014	Crash	Hardly Criminal	Producer, engineer, mixing, guitars, banjo, dobro, keyboards, percussion, vocals, composer
2016	Edward Sharpe and the Magnetic Zeros	PersonA	Guitars, vocals, composer, band member
2019	Adam Green	Engine of Paradise	Guitar
2025	Brooks Nielsen	Grain of Dirt	Producer, Songwriter, Guitars, Keys, Bass, Flute, Saxophone
2025	Alex Ebert	Celia	Co-Producer, Mixer, Guitars, Piano, Bass
