= Orpheo McCord =

American composer

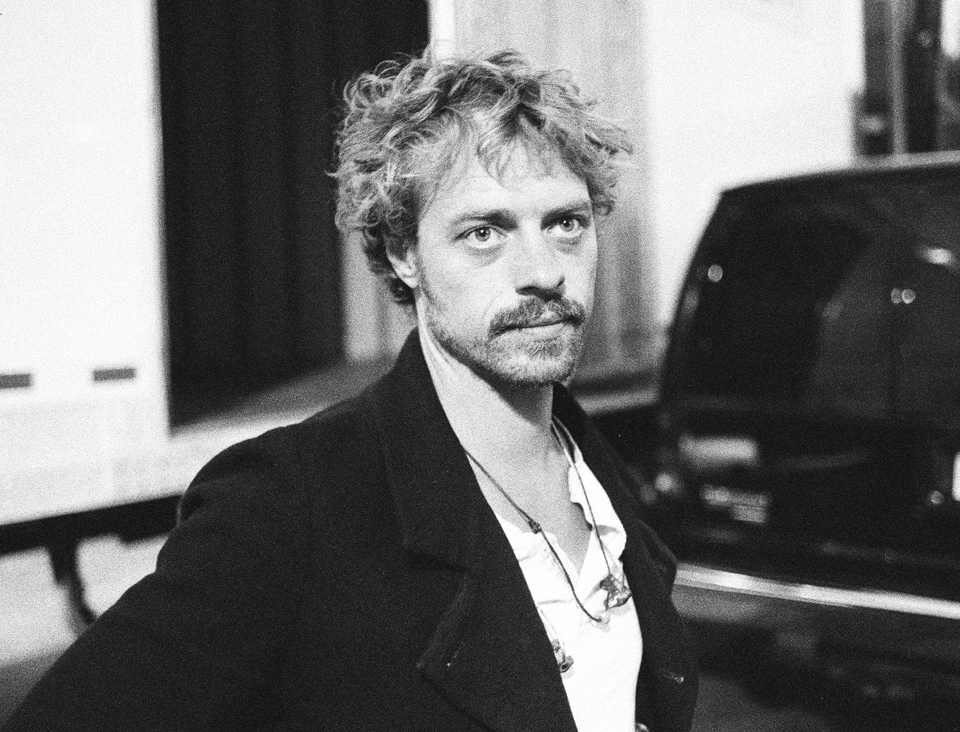

Background information
- Born: July 19, 1979 (age 47); Victoria, British Columbia, Canada
- Genres: Ambient; new age; postmodern; rock; folk; psychedelic; world
- Occupation: Musician
- Instruments: Drums; percussion; vocals
- Years active: 2002-present

Orpheo McCord (born July 19, 1979) is an American composer and percussionist. He was a founding member of the now-defunct Edward Sharpe and the Magnetic Zeros and was a former member of The Fall and Fool's Gold. He has also played with Cass McCombs. His debut solo album, Recovery Inhale, was released on January 26, 2018. His second album, Music for Ketamine Therapy Vol. I, was released on October 8, 2023.

== Early life and education ==
McCord attended Berklee College of Music, graduating in 2002. He has spent time in Ghana studying African percussion, and has also studied percussion in Mali, Cuba and Morocco.

His father Joseph McCord has said he was named after the musician Orpheus from Greek mythology. Joseph McCord was a professional mime who went by the name Merlin, and was one of Ken Kesey's Merry Pranksters.

== Career ==
=== The Fall (2006-07) ===
In May 2006 after several members of U.K. Band The Fall quit mid-tour, McCord was recruited by frontman Mark E. Smith to join The Fall along with guitarist Tim Presley and bassist Rob Barbato. McCord toured the US and Europe with the band, and was a member of The Fall for their 26th album Reformation Post TLC (2007), as well as the live album Last Night at The Palais, recorded in 2007 and released two years later. The 2006-07 lineup was a pleasant one for The Fall, absent the infighting that marked most of the band's numerous incarnations.

In his 2008 autobiography Renegade, Smith called McCord the best of the more than a dozen drummers The Fall had up to that point, with an openness to new ideas and straightforward playing that avoided cliches.

=== Edward Sharpe and the Magnetic Zeros (2007-present) ===
Edward Sharpe and the Magnetic Zeros were formed in Los Angeles in 2007 by frontman Alex Ebert. McCord met Ebert at a mutual friend's party and then again while jogging in Elysian Park, where Ebert asked him to join the band. They released their debut album Up From Below in 2009, followed by Here in 2012, a self-titled album in 2013, and PersonA in 2016. The group won the Grammy Award for Best Music Film in 2013 for the documentary Big Easy Express. McCord incorporates African influences in his work with the band, using a hybridization of drum set, marimba, conga, djembe and electronic percussion.

McCord played marimba on Alex Ebert's score for the 2013 film All Is Lost, which won the Golden Globe Award for Best Original Score.

=== Solo work ===
On January 26, 2018, McCord's debut solo album, Recovery Inhale, was released on Sound Creature Records. The album is composed of "hypnotic instrumental pieces... treading the line between new age and minimalist ambient music." "Ghost Ship", the first single, was released in December 2017. On the album, McCord performs all instruments, predominantly effected marimba and kalimba.

McCord's second solo album, Music for Ketamine Therapy Vol. I, was released on Sound Creature Records on October 8, 2023.

=== Other work ===
McCord has intermittently toured as drummer for Cass McCombs since 2007 and has played on four of his albums. He was formerly the drummer and percussion leader in Fool's Gold, an LA pop band whose music incorporates African rhythms. In 2010, he played with Harper Simon as a duo at the Festival au Désert in Mali, outside of Timbuktu. They also performed there with the Tuareg band Tinariwen. In 2014, McCord and Mikael Jorgensen (pianist/keyboardist for Wilco) formed the duo Prism Break, inspired by early 1970s German experimental rock. McCord has also performed with Ima Robot, The Flaming Lips, Jack Johnson, Dawes and He's My Brother She's My Sister.

=== Chromasonic ===
Chromasonic, founded in 2019 by McCord, Joel Shearer, Johannes Girardoni and Harriet Girardoni, is a series of immersive light and sound experiences to inspire expanded states of awareness and connection, fostering deep relaxation and enhancing emotional well-being. The group created Chromasonic Refrequencing, which synchronizes lightwaves and soundwaves in real-time, creating synesthetic environments where light becomes audible and sound becomes visible. Chromasonic is a part of the NeuroArts movement, a transdisciplinary study of how the arts and aesthetic experiences change the body, brain, and behavior and how this knowledge is translated into practices that advance health and wellbeing. Data collected at Chromasonic's Satellite One permanent installation showed physiological changes, including increased parasympathetic activity and shifts in brain activity related to sensory processing and attention.

There have been installations in California, Colorado, and Italy, and there is a permanent site in Venice, California, called Satellite One, which launched in 2021. In April 2024, Chromasonic collaborated with Google on an interactive exhibition, demonstrating how color influences one's perception of the world, at Milan Design Week in Italy. On January 8, 2025, Chromasonic Field, a 10,000-square-foot walk-through installation, opened in the Arts District of downtown Los Angeles. Chromasonic Field is a vibrant light and sound constellation of repeating translucent scrims that create a series of open and interstitial spaces. In the experiential environment, each of the 21 nodes is activated by a single source of light and spatialized sound, creating a bridge between the ethereal and physical.

== Personal life ==
McCord is based in Ojai, California, where he lives with his wife Rachel Kolar (of He's My Brother She's My Sister) and their two children.

== Discography ==
=== Albums ===
Year	Title
2018	Recovery Inhale: Released: January 26, 2018; Label: Sound Creature Records; Formats: LP, digital download
2023	Music for Ketamine Therapy Vol. I: Released: October 8, 2023; Label: Sound Creature Records; Formats: digital download

=== Appears on ===
Year	Album/Song	Artist	Credits
2007	Reformation Post TLC	The Fall	Drums
2008	Dropping the Writ	Cass McCombs	Drums, percussion
2008	2	Darker My Love	Percussion
2009	Last Night at The Palais	The Fall	Drums, backing vocals
2009	Up From Below	Edward Sharpe and the Magnetic Zeros	Drums, percussion, vocals
2009	Friends	Luke Top	Drums, percussion
2009	Fool's Gold	Fool's Gold	Percussion, vocals
2009	Catacombs	Cass McCombs	Drums, percussion, vocals
2009	"(Get Off Your) High Horse Lady" (Devendra Banhart Remix)	Oasis	Drums, percussion
2010	Another Man's Treasure	Ima Robot	Electronic drums, percussion
2011	Wit's End	Cass McCombs	Drums, percussion
2012	Here	Edward Sharpe and the Magnetic Zeros	Drums, percussion, marimba, drum machine, vocals
2013	Stories Don't End	Dawes	Percussion
2013	Prisma	Motel	Drums
2013	Nobody Dances in This Town	He's My Brother She's My Sister	Drums, percussion
2013	Edward Sharpe and the Magnetic Zeros	Edward Sharpe and the Magnetic Zeros	Drums, percussion, marimba, vocals
2014	Hardly Criminal	Crash	Composer, percussion
2014	Light Show	Jack Name	Drums, percussion
2015	A Folk Set Apart	Cass McCombs	Drums, screams
2015	Live In No Particular Order: 2009-2014	Edward Sharpe and the Magnetic Zeros	Drums, percussion
2016	PersonA	Edward Sharpe and the Magnetic Zeros	Drums, percussion, marimba, timpani, vocals
2018	Lost Time Behind the Moon	Scott Hirsch	Drums
2021	"Wannabe King"	Aaron Embry	Drums
2023	"Répit"	Sœt	Writer, instrumentalist
2023	"Réve"	Sœt	Writer, instrumentalist
2023	"Vessel to Vapor"	Eros Odeon	Composer, instrumentalist
2023	"Rays of Eternal Presence"	Eros Odeon	Composer, instrumentalist

=== Soundtracks and compilations ===
Year	Album	Artist	Credits
2012	Big Easy Express (OST)	Edward Sharpe and the Magnetic Zeros	Drums, percussion
2012	The Flaming Lips and Heady Fwends	The Flaming Lips feat. Edward Sharpe and the Magnetic Zeros	Drums, percussion ("Helping the Retarded to Know God")
2012	Every Mother Counts 2012	Edward Sharpe and the Magnetic Zeros	Drums, percussion ("Mother")
2013	The Music Is You: A Tribute to John Denver	Edward Sharpe and the Magnetic Zeros	Drums, percussion, marimba, drum machine, vocals ("Wooden Indian")
2013	All Is Lost (OST)	Alex Ebert	Marimba
2015	Strangerland (OST)	Keefus Ciancia	Drums, percussion
2017	Singles 1978–2016	The Fall	Drums, percussion
2017	A-Sides 1978-2016	The Fall	Drums, percussion
2018	58 Golden Greats	The Fall	Drums, percussion
2018	The Alchemy of Fire	Various Artists	Performer
2023	The Stones and Brian Jones (OST)	Orpheo McCord	Theme music composer
