= 40 Day Dream/Geez Louise =

Single by Edward Sharpe and the Magnetic Zeros
- Released: August 30, 2009 (7" vinyl only)
- Genre: Indie folk, indie pop
- Length: 7:22
- Label: Rough Trade, Community

Edward Sharpe and the Magnetic Zeros singles chronology
"Simplest Love" (2009)	"40 Day Dream/Geez Louise" (2009)	"Home"" (2010)

"40 Day Dream"/"Geez Louise" is a 7" vinyl single released in the UK to succeed the album Up from Below by Edward Sharpe and the Magnetic Zeros. It appeared on the sixth episode of the third season of Chuck (entitled "Chuck Versus the Nacho Sampler" and airing on February 1, 2010); Episode 2 of HBO's Hung; Jimmy Kimmel Live! on November 11, 2010; and Conan on December 15, 2010.

After repeated requests from a fan to play "40 Day Dream" at a show in 2016 in which the band was only performing new album PersonA, Alex Ebert joked, "It’s like my 'Free Bird.' I was so full of shit then."

== Track listing ==
All tracks are written by Edward Sharpe and the Magnetic Zeros.

40 Day Dream/Geez Louise
No.	Title	Length
1.	"40 Day Dream"	3:54
2.	"Geez Louise"	3:41
