= Your Future Our Clutter =

Album by The Fall

Studio album by The Fall
- Released: 26 April 2010
- Recorded: 2009
- Studio: Chairworks Studios, Castleford; 6db Studios, Salford
- Genre: Post-punk
- Length: 48:11 (CD); 60:32 (Vinyl)
- Label: Domino
- Producer: Ross Orton; Simon Archer; Tim Robbins; Mark E. Smith

The Fall chronology
Last Night at The Palais (2009)	Your Future Our Clutter (2010)	Ersatz G.B. (2011)

Singles from Your Future Our Clutter
- 1. "Slippy Floor" Released: 16 November 2009; 2. "Bury!" Released: 17 April 2010

Professional ratings
Aggregate scores
Source	Rating
Metacritic	81/100
Review scores
Source	Rating
AllMusic	3.5/5 stars
The A.V. Club	A−
Drowned in Sound	9/10
The Guardian	4/5 stars
Mojo	4/5 stars
NME	8/10
Pitchfork	8.0/10
PopMatters	9/10
Q	4/5 stars
Slant Magazine	4/5 stars

Your Future Our Clutter is an album by the Fall, released in the UK on 26 April 2010. It is the group's twenty-seventh studio album, and their first for independent record label Domino. The album was recorded at Chairworks Studios, Castleford and 6db Studio, Salford. Publicity for the record describes it as the group's "most rampant, most forward moving, bone shaking best." The album had previously been referred to as Our Future Your Clutter.

As with the group's preceding album, 2008's Imperial Wax Solvent, the line-up consists of Mark E. Smith (vocals), the group's chief songwriter and only constant member, as well as his wife Eleni Poulou (keyboards and vocals), Dave "The Eagle" Spurr (bass), Peter "PP" Greenway (guitar) and Keiron Melling (drums). The album was produced by Ross Orton, Mark E. Smith, and Simon "Ding" Archer, who produced three songs.

Your Future Our Clutter entered the UK Album charts at number No. 38. "Bury Pts. 1 + 3" peaked at No. 94 in France. The album has received favourable reviews, with New Yorker music critic Sasha Frere-Jones calling it one of the best albums of the year.

== Track listing ==
=== CD edition ===
No.	Title	Writer(s)	Length
1.	"O.F.Y.C. Showcase"	Mark E. Smith	5:49
2.	"Bury Pts. 1 + 3"	Smith, David Spurr	6:36
3.	"Mexico Wax Solvent"	Smith, Peter Greenway	6:14
4.	"Cowboy George"	Smith, Greenway, Eleni Poulou	5:42
5.	"Hot Cake"	Smith, Spurr	3:18
6.	"Y.F.O.C. / Slippy Floor"	Smith, Poulou, Greenway, Keiron Melling	7:42
7.	"Chino"	Smith, Spurr	5:20
8.	"Funnel of Love"	Kent Westberry, Charlie McCoy	2:55
9.	"Weather Report 2"	Smith, Poulou	6:35
Total length:			48:11

=== Vinyl edition ===
The double vinyl version comes on 180g heavyweight vinyl with two exclusive, non-CD tracks: "986 Generator" and "Get a Summer Song Goin'" and features a re-ordered track list. It does not come in a gatefold sleeve.

Side A
No.	Title	Writer(s)	Length
1.	"O.F.Y.C. Showcase"	Smith	5:49
2.	"Bury Pts. 1 + 3"	Smith, Spurr	6:36
3.	"Hot Cake"	Smith, Spurr	3:18

Side B
No.	Title	Writer(s)	Length
4.	"Mexico Wax Solvent"	Smith, Greenway	6:14
5.	"Y.F.O.C. / Slippy Floor"	Smith, Poulou, Greenway, Melling	7:42

Side C
No.	Title	Writer(s)	Length
6.	"Chino"	Smith, Spurr	5:20
7.	"Funnel of Love"	Westberry, McCoy	2:55
8.	"986 Generator"	Smith, Melling	8:03

Side D
No.	Title	Writer(s)	Length
9.	"Weather Report 2"	Smith, Poulou	6:35
10.	"Get a Summer Song Goin'"	Smith	4:18
11.	"Cowboy George"	Smith, Greenway, Poulou	5:42
Total length:			60:32

- "Cowboy George" contains an uncredited sample of Daft Punk's "Harder, Better, Faster, Stronger", which is heard briefly fading in and out during the intro.

== Personnel ==
The Fall

- Mark E. Smith – lead vocals, tapes, production
- Eleni Poulou – keyboards, bass, backing vocals
- Peter "PP" Greenway – guitar
- Dave "The Eagle" Spurr – bass guitar
- Keiron Melling – drums, percussion

Technical

- Ross Orton – production, engineering, mixing
- Simon "Ding" Archer – production, engineering
- Tim Robbins – additional production, engineering
- Russell Fawcus – engineering
- Chris Potter – mastering
- Mark Kennedy – cover art
- Safy Etiel – cover art

== Charts ==
Chart (2010)	Peak position
Greek Albums (IFPI)	48
