= Bearfoot (American band) =

American post-bluegrass band

- Origin: Cordova, Alaska, U.S.
- Genres: Bluegrass; folk; Americana
- Years active: 1999–2013
- Labels: Bearfoot Bluegrass, Glacier, Compass Records
- Members: Angela Oudean; Jason Norris; Todd Grebe; Megan McCormick
- Past members: Odessa; Nora Jane Struthers; PJ George; Annalisa Tornfelt; Kate Hamre; Sam Grisman; Mike Mickelson; Malani O'Toole; Drew Lawhorn; Annalisa Woodlee
- Website: bearfootband.com

Bearfoot was a post-bluegrass band that formed in Alaska in 1999 as Bearfoot Bluegrass. The original all-Alaskan band competed in and won the 26th annual Telluride Bluegrass band contest in 2001, and returned in 2002 to perform in the Telluride Bluegrass Festival. They eventually changed their name to Bearfoot as their music evolved including Americana, post-bluegrass, and string instrument based pop.

They wrote many songs including (the writing) the Alaskan epic Fishtrap Joe, based on one of the historical struggles in Alaska (between locals and Seattle fish empires over fish traps) and the finding of an old skeleton near Cordova, Alaska by two boys, one of which (Mike Mickelson) became a founding Bearfoot Bluegrass band member.

== History ==
=== Bearfoot Bluegrass ===
Before Bearfoot Bluegrass formed, most of the starting line-up met at the Alaska Folk Arts Camp in Anchorage, Alaska. Angela Oudean (vocals, fiddle), Jason Norris (vocals, mandolin), Kate Hamre (acoustic bass), and Annalisa Woodlee (vocals, fiddle) are from Anchorage. Mike Mickleson (rhythm and lead guitar) is from Cordova. Mike's mother, Belle Mickelson, started a music camp in Cordova to encourage her son to practice and play. The others joined Mike there and when Belle decided to create a camp band, the 4H Fiddle and Dance Camp (also known as the Bluegrass and Old-Time Music and Dance Camp) the five players plus Malani O'Toole (vocals, fiddle, guitar) came together as Bearfoot Bluegrass in 1999. The band began traveling around Alaska teaching and encouraging musicians to play in small rural communities. In January 2001 they recorded their first album Only Time Knows and made history in June 2001 by becoming the first Alaskan band to win the Telluride Bluegrass band contest, joining the ranks of reputable artists including Nickel Creek and the Dixie Chicks. For a second album, Back Home, they approached Todd Phillips in 2003 and asked him to produce it. Phillips helped teach the band more advanced techniques, timing, rhythm, and he worked on the singing and phrasing, concentrating on details. He helped turn the band from talented beginners into skilled musicians.

=== Bearfoot ===
As the music of the band evolved to include music beyond bluegrass, they changed their name from "Bearfoot Bluegrass" to simply "Bearfoot", intending to reflect the Americana approach of their music and their becoming post-bluegrass. Under this heading, they released the album Follow Me in 2006. The Alaskans in the band were joined by Odessa Jorgensen from California (fiddle, vocals) at the end of 2008, after Annalisa Tornfelt left the band to spend more time with her family. The band continued to be widely beloved for its three strong female vocalists. In 2009, Bearfoot signed with Compass Records and produced the highly acclaimed album Doors and Windows. Bearfoot, staying true to its roots, in 2009 toured the state twice with impressive turn-out—in June and in November. The second time through, to the delight of many, they toured in breakup boots in classic Alaskan style, all except for Jorgensen, who at their performance in Talkeetna voiced her disappointment at not having been informed of the unorthodox dress code. In general, Bearfoot has enjoyed a devoted following among Alaskans who view them as a type of "small town heroes".

=== Band lineup changes ===
In 2010 Kate Hamre left the band, with fellow band member Mike Mickelson saying that she felt that "10 years was enough". She was replaced by Sam Grisman, the son of 1960's icon David Grisman. In early 2011, Mike Mickelson, the only member of the band still living in Alaska, left to go back to "fishing... in Cordova." Grisman and Jorgensen also departed at approximately the same time. A very much reconstructed band then moved to Nashville and with new members Nora Jane Struthers, P. J. George, and Todd Grebe, released the album American Story in 2011. Struthers quit in 2012 and the band performed a final show in Bozeman, Montana in February 2013.

== Discography ==
=== Albums ===
- Only Time Knows (2001) Bearfoot Bluegrass
- Back Home (2003) Glacier Records
- Follow Me (2006) Glacier Records
- Doors and Windows (2009) Compass Records
- American Story (2011) Compass Records

=== Music videos ===
Year	Title	Director
2011	"Tell Me a Story"	Dycee Wildman
