= Ersatz GB =

Studio album by the Fall
- Released: 14 November 2011
- Recorded: Mid 2011
- Studios: Metropolis Studios, London; Toe Rag Studios, London
- Genre: Alternative rock
- Length: 45:41
- Label: Cherry Red
- Producers: Simon Archer; Mark E. Smith

The Fall chronology
| Your Future Our Clutter (2010) | Ersatz GB (2011) | Re-Mit (2013) |

Singles from Ersatz GB
- 1. "Laptop Dog" Released: 7 November 2011

Ersatz GB is the 28th studio album by the post-punk band the Fall, released on Cherry Red Records 14 November 2011. It is the Fall's first album on Cherry Red.

The album marks the first time in the history of the Fall that the group have released three consecutive studio albums recorded with the same line-up.

== Recording ==
Initially an album's worth of material was recorded in Berlin just previous to recording Ersatz GB, according to guitarist Pete Greenway. Along with bassist David Spurr and drummer Keiron Melling, Greenway was sent to Berlin by singer Mark E. Smith to check out a studio. "We recorded 10 tracks in 2 days and they all sounded magnificent to our ears," Greenway said. "Mark told us later that he only wanted us to report back about how good the studio was, maybe use it at some point. He wasn't interested in the recordings and never listened to them." The album was eventually recorded in London at Metropolis Studios with many of lead singer Mark E. Smith's vocals being recorded at Toe Rag Studios in Hackney. It features the same group lineup as its two immediate predecessors, Imperial Wax Solvent (2008) and Your Future Our Clutter (2010), establishing the current lineup as unusually stable by the Fall's standards. The album was produced by Mark E. Smith and the Fall's frequent collaborator and former bass guitarist Simon Archer. In his sleevenotes for the album, Smith wrote that "brighter mixes and versions, tracks" existed, but that these were dismissed because "brightness does not fit with ERSATZ GB". In a 2012 interview, Smith claimed that the mix that was released was not the one he preferred.

All 10 songs on the album were extensively previewed by the group live, and the first song to appear in live sets – "Greenway" – appeared early in the tour for previous album Your Future Our Clutter.

== Music ==
One year before its release, Mark E. Smith described Ersatz GB as "a lot heavier" than its predecessors. Keyboardist Elena Poulou stated that she added "a lot of keyboard layers on this one, in an atmospheric, melodic way", preferring to use analogue rather than digital keyboards. She also sang lead vocals on "Happi Song".

Critics suggested that the music of Ersatz GB was influenced by rockabilly and krautrock, known to be among Smith's favourite genres. Other possible influences identified by critics included Captain Beefheart and the Velvet Underground. The song "Greenway" is based on "Gameboy" by the Greek comedy metal band Anorimoi, from their 2005 album Kings of Feta. Smith wrote new lyrics for the song in English.

=== Lyrical content ===
Characteristically, Mark E. Smith's lyrics for the album were distinct and cryptic, alternating between seemingly free association and narration.

In "Nate Will Not Return", Smith makes multiple references to the TV show Gossip Girl, and the song may be named after the character Nate Archibald. Most lines in the song rhyme with "Nate", including passing references to Tate Gallery and an earlier the Fall song, "Hot Cake".

"Greenway" shares its name with the band's guitarist, Peter Greenway. According to Peter Greenway, the song is not about him, but about Smith's perception of what he should be like: A "gangster type who doesn't take any shit ... a nasty guy ... Quite far from the truth, to be honest". In the song, the singer relates seeing his own lookalike in a music video and visiting a "snotty and offensive" group of people at their hotel room. Critics Luke Turner of The Quietus and Ben Ratliff of The New York Times interpreted "Greenway" as an attack on the band These New Puritans, who were explicitly mentioned by Smith during live performances of the song.

== Release ==
Cherry Red Records announced that they had signed the Fall and would release their new album later in 2011 in April 2011. Ersatz GB was released on CD, digital download, and limited edition vinyl on 14 November 2011. It was preceded by a single, "Laptop Dog", released on limited edition 7" vinyl and digital download on 7 November.

== Reception ==
Professional ratings
Aggregate scores
| Source | Rating |
|---|---|
| Metacritic | 62/100 |
Review scores
| Source | Rating |
| AllMusic | 3/5 stars |
| BBC | unfavourable |
| The Bulletin | 5/5 stars |
| The Guardian | 2/5 stars |
| NME | 8/10 stars |
| The New York Times | mixed |
| Pitchfork | 2.2/10 |
| The Quietus | favourable |
| Spin | 7/10 stars |
| The Wire | favourable |

In The Sunday Times, Stewart Lee said the album "finds Mark E Smith fronting a kind of amphetamine drone rock band. It grooves on two or three chord riffs, pounding bass booms, and Poulou's retro keyboard blips, like some ancient krautrock legend, but pin-eyed with punk intensity." The Wire said, "Some might find the group's repetitive grooves too smooth a match for all Smith's spewing. But his bark infects everything around it." Pitchfork said its "abrasiveness, inscrutability, and tedium are increasingly tough to take."

== Track listing ==
| No. | Title | Writer(s) | Length |
|---|---|---|---|
| 1. | "Cosmos 7" | Mark E. Smith, David Spurr | 2:48 |
| 2. | "Taking Off" | Smith, Peter Greenway | 4:01 |
| 3. | "Nate Will Not Return" | Smith, Greenway, Spurr | 6:02 |
| 4. | "Mask Search" | Smith, Greenway | 2:41 |
| 5. | "Greenway" | Smith, Dimitris Ioakimoglou | 4:13 |
| 6. | "Happi Song" | Elena Poulou | 4:19 |
| 7. | "Monocard" | Smith, Spurr, Keiron Melling | 8:08 |
| 8. | "Laptop Dog" | Smith, Greenway | 4:01 |
| 9. | "I've Seen Them Come" | Smith | 6:05 |
| 10. | "Age of Chang" | Smith, Spurr | 3:27 |

== Personnel ==
The Fall

- Mark E. Smith – vocals, production, cover art
- Elena Poulou – keyboards, backing vocals, lead vocals on "Happi Song"
- David Spurr – bass guitar, backing vocals
- Keiron Melling – drums
- Pete Greenway – guitar, backing vocals (uncredited)

Technical

- Simon Archer – production
- Sam Wheat – engineering
- Ed Deegan – engineering
- Mark Kennedy – cover art
