= Back Home (Bearfoot Bluegrass album) =

Studio album by Bearfoot Bluegrass
- Released: August 22, 2003
- Recorded: August, December 2002; March 2003
- Genre: Bluegrass
- Length: 40:55
- Label: Glacier Records
- Producer: Todd Phillips

Bearfoot Bluegrass chronology
Only Time Knows (2001)	Back Home (2003)	Follow Me (2006)

Back Home is the second album by Bearfoot Bluegrass, released 2003. The album was recorded and mixed at The Vineyard Studio, Todd Phillips' studio in Redwood Valley, California. The band traveled to Todd Phillips studio three times to have him produce the album. In the liner notes, Phillips wrote "I am very proud of Bearfoot Bluegrass. Right before my eyes they have evolved from enthusiastic, talented kids into seasoned musicians -- now with a high caliber recording to their credit."

== Track listing ==
No.	Title	Writer(s)	Length
1.	"Dirty Kitchen"	Frank Solivan II	3:21
2.	"Good Morning Country Rain"	Eddy Raven	3:09
3.	"Back Home"	Angela Oudean	4:04
4.	"Won't Be Long"	John Leslie McFarland	3:48
5.	"Love Chooses You"	Laurie Lewis	5:00
6.	"I Know What It Means To Be Lonesome"	James Brockman, James Kendis, Nat H. Vincent	2:03
7.	"Pretty Lady"	Jason Norris	2:53
8.	"That Old Kind of Love"	Annalisa Woodlee	3:37
9.	"Fishtrap Joe"	Mike Mickelson	4:22
10.	"Homeless Waltz"	Carl Jones	2:45
11.	"Sweetest Gift"	traditional	3:35
12.	"Her Memory's Bound to Ride"	T. Michael Coleman, Lou Reid	2:18
Total length:			40:55

== Personnel ==
Bearfoot

- Angela Oudean – vocals, fiddle, guitar
- Annalisa Woodlee – vocals, fiddle, viola
- Kate Hamre – vocals, acoustic bass
- Mike Mickelson – vocals, guitar
- Jason Norris – mandolin
