= Last Night at The Palais =

Live album by the Fall
- Released: 3 August 2009
- Recorded: 1 April 2007
- Venue: Hammersmith Palais, London
- Genre: Rock
- Label: Sanctuary

The Fall chronology
Imperial Wax Solvent (2008)	Last Night at The Palais (2009)	Your Future Our Clutter (2010)

Professional ratings
Review scores
Source	Rating
The Guardian	4/5 stars

Last Night at The Palais is a live album by English post-punk band the Fall, recorded at the Hammersmith Palais on 1 April 2007 and released in 2009.

== Background ==
The recording has historic interest as this was the last concert to be put on at the Hammersmith Palais before it was closed. The band had already been booked to play the venue in support of their 27th studio album Reformation Post TLC in advance of the closure announcement.

In addition to group leader Mark E. Smith, the band included his wife, Elena Poulou who played keyboards and also sang lead on one track. The remainder of the band was quickly recruited from the West Coast of the US, as the previous line-up had been fired during an earlier tour. Guitarist Pete Greenway had spent time as a roadie and dep with the band before being promoted to full-time member for this release.

This release also includes a DVD which features the show filmed with Multi-cameras and 5.1 sound. The DVD also contains a bonus: the "Reformation" promo clip. The release features photos from the venue on the night of the show by photographer Jeff Higgott on the rear and inlay of the jewel case.

== Reception ==
The Guardian's Ian Gittins said the line up was "the group's strongest incarnation in years". Record Collector thought the line-up was "the best of recent times", and enjoyed Smith's ad-libs, including a reference to Gary Lineker as the "man from Walkers".

== Track listing ==
1. "Senior Twilight Stock Replacer" (Smith, Spurr)
2. "Pacifying Joint" (Smith)
3. "Fall Sound" (Smith, McCord, Barbato, Presley)
4. "Over! Over!" (Smith)
5. "Theme from Sparta F.C." (Smith, Pritchard, Watts)
6. "Hungry Freaks, Daddy" (Frank Zappa)
7. "Wrong Place, Right Time" (Smith, Poulou)
8. "My Door Is Never" (Smith)
9. "The Wright Stuff" (Smith, Poulou)
10. "White Lightning" (J.P. Richardson)
11. "Blindness" (Smith, Birtwistle)
12. "Reformation!" (Smith, Barbato)

== Personnel ==
- Mark E. Smith – vocals, keyboards on "Blindness"
- Tim Presley – guitar, backing vocals
- Rob Barbato – bass guitar, backing vocals, keyboards on "The Wright Stuff"
- Dave Spurr – bass guitar
- Peter Greenway – guitar
- Elena Poulou – keyboards, lead vocals on "The Wright Stuff", backing vocals
- Orpheo McCord – drums, backing vocals
