= Doors and Windows (album) =

Studio album by Bearfoot
- Released: April 21, 2009
- Genre: Bluegrass, contemporary bluegrass, Americana
- Length: 38:32
- Label: Compass
- Producer: Garry West

Bearfoot chronology
Follow Me (2006)	Doors and Windows (2009)	American Story (2011)

Doors and Windows is the fourth album by Bearfoot, released in 2009.

== Development ==
In a departure from their previous albums, the band has leaned more on a lead singer, Odessa Jorgensen, who joined the band in September 2008. However, the band still shares vocals amongst all the other players, with a specialty of sister harmonies backed by twin fiddles. The recording also is the first time the band has involved guest musicians. The music performed by Bearfoot has strayed from traditional bluegrass, encompassing multiple other styles under the umbrella of Americana. Although straying further from traditional bluegrass, this is their first album to include the bluegrass staple - the banjo, played by guest performer Alison Brown. The album debuted at the top of Billboard Magazine's Bluegrass chart. The band created most of the recording in Netherland, Colorado, and later recorded their latest album in 10 days in a studio at their new home of Nashville, Tennessee.

== Track listing ==
No.	Title	Writer(s)	Length
1.	"Oh My Love"	Megan McCormick	4:07
2.	"Single Girl"	traditional, arranged by Bearfoot	3:05
3.	"Heaven"	Odessa Jorgensen	3:23
4.	"Doors and Windows"	O. Jorgensen	4:22
5.	"Before I Go"	John Hiatt	4:14
6.	"Caroline"	Annalisa Tornfelt	3:34
7.	"Don't Let Me Down"	John Lennon, Paul McCartney	3:16
8.	"My One True Love"	O. Jorgensen	3:42
9.	"Time Is No Medicine"	O. Jorgensen, Angela Oudean, Garry West, M. McCormick	3:41
10.	"Northward Bound"	Todd Grebe	3:38
11.	"Good in the Kitchen"	A. Tornfelt, A. Oudean, Kate Hamre, Mike Mickelson, Jason Norris	1:30
Total length:			38:32

== Personnel ==
Bearfoot

- Odessa Jorgensen – Lead Vocals, Fiddle, Guitar (4, 8)
- Angela Oudean – Vocals, Fiddle
- Kate Hamre – Lead Vocals (2), Vocals, Bass
- Mike Mickelson – Vocals, Guitar, Tenor Guitar
- Jason Norris – Vocals, Mandolin

Guest musicians

- Larry Atamanuik – Drums and Percussion (2, 3, 4, 5, 6, 8, 10, 11)
- Alison Brown – Banjo (5)
- Andy Hall – Resophonic Guitar (1, 3)
- Todd Phillips – Bass (11)
- Andrea Zonn – Strings (4)
