= Reformation Post TLC =

Studio album by the Fall
- Released: 12 February 2007
- Recorded: Late 2006
- Studios: Gracielands Studio, Rochdale
- Genre: Alternative rock
- Length: 61:23
- Labels: Slogan (UK); Narnack (US); Cherry Red (reissue)
- Producers: Tim "Gracielands" Baxter; Mark E. Smith

The Fall chronology
Fall Heads Roll (2005)	Reformation Post TLC (2007)	Imperial Wax Solvent (2008)

Singles from Reformation Post TLC
- 1. "Reformation! The Single" Released: 9 April 2007

Alternative cover
- Front cover of US release

Professional ratings
Aggregate scores
Source	Rating
Metacritic	67/100
Review scores
Source	Rating
AllMusic	4/5 stars
Robert Christgau	A–
Mojo	4/5 stars
NME	7/10
Pitchfork	4.0/10
PopMatters	5/10
Q	3/5 stars
Stylus	B

Reformation Post TLC is the twenty-fifth studio album by the Fall, released in the UK on 12 February 2007.

The album features Mark E Smith and his wife, Elena, with newcomers Tim Presley and Rob Barbato (of Darker My Love), Orpheo McCord (of The Hill) and Dave Spurr (of Motherjohn). Presley, Barbato and McCord, all Americans, joined the band as emergency replacements for Ben Pritchard, Spencer Birtwistle and Steve Trafford, all of whom quit the band during an American tour in April 2006. In his 2008 autobiography Smith praised the Americans for revitalizing the Fall, due to their openness to new ideas and not being overly-impressed by influential UK bands (e.g., Oasis and the Stone Roses) that had shaped a generation of young English musicians.

Smith said in an interview with Q that the "post-TLC" refers to the band after the departure of "traitors, liars and cunts".

Reformation Post TLC was reissued by Cherry Red Records in April 2020, both on vinyl and as an expanded 4CD edition.

== Track listing ==
=== Original UK release ===
No.	Title	Writer(s)	Length
1.	"Over! Over!"	Mark E. Smith	4:05
2.	"Reformation!"	Smith, Robert Barbato	6:59
3.	"Fall Sound"	Smith, Barbato, Tim Presley, Orpheo McCord	3:54
4.	"White Line Fever"	Merle Haggard	3:00
5.	"Insult Song"	Smith, Barbato, Presley, McCord	5:41
6.	"My Door Is Never"	Smith	3:40
7.	"Coach and Horses"	Smith, McCord	1:48
8.	"The Usher"	Smith, Elena Poulou, Barbato, Presley, McCord	1:18
9.	"The Wright Stuff"	Smith, Barbato, Poulou	5:47
10.	"Scenario"	Smith, Barbato, Presley, McCord	3:25
11.	"Das Boat"	Smith, Barbato, Presley, McCord	10:07
12.	"The Bad Stuff"	Smith, Barbato, Poulou, Presley, McCord	2:25
13.	"Systematic Abuse"	Smith, Barbato, Poulou, Presley, McCord	8:38
14.	"Outro"	Smith, Barbato, Poulou, Presley, McCord	0:36

"Scenario" continuously references "Veteran's Day Poppy" by Captain Beefheart and his Magic Band, from their album Trout Mask Replica. "Over! Over!" is a cover of the 1968 track "Coming Down" by the United States of America (not credited) with different lyrics.

=== UK vinyl edition ===
Released on 5 March, the UK double album edition was different from the CD format. Several songs appeared in slightly alternate mixes with some tracks extended and others shortened. "Outro" was omitted altogether. On 22 March it was confirmed that later pressings of the UK CD would follow this track listing.

No.	Title	Writer(s)	Length
1.	"Over! Over!"	Mark E. Smith	4:01
2.	"Reformation!" (extended)	Smith, Robert Barbato	7:18
3.	"Fall Sound"	Smith, Barbato, Tim Presley, Orpheo McCord	3:49
4.	"White Line Fever"	Merle Haggard	2:57
5.	"Insult Song" (extended)	Smith, Barbato, Presley, McCord	6:41
6.	"My Door Is Never"	Smith	3:37
7.	"Coach and Horses"	Smith, McCord	1:47
8.	"The Usher"	Smith, Elena Poulou, Barbato, Presley, McCord	1:16
9.	"The Wright Stuff" (extended)	Smith, Barbato, Poulou	6:17
10.	"Scenario"	Smith, Barbato, Presley, McCord	3:28
11.	"Das Boat" (edited – the introduction is missing)	Smith, Barbato, Presley, McCord	8:28
12.	"The Bad Stuff"	Smith, Barbato, Poulou, Presley, McCord	1:34
13.	"Systematic Abuse"	Smith, Barbato, Poulou, Presley, McCord	8:32

=== US edition ===
The US edition was released on Narnack Records on 27 March. This edition omits "The Usher" despite the track being included on promotional copies and on the US iTunes edition ). All tracks that are extended on the UK 2LP edition appear in those versions rather than their UK CD counterparts. The version of "Das Boat" is the extended promo version. The US release also comes with four QuickTime movies of the group performing live at the Hiro Ballroom in New York City in November 2006. The songs featured are Frank Zappa's "Hungry Freaks, Daddy", "My Door Is Never", "Scenario" and "Theme from Sparta F.C." from The Real New Fall LP.

=== 2020 expanded edition ===
Disc 1

- as per original UK CD.

Disc 2

No.	Title	Writer(s)	Length
1.	"Reformation!" (uncut) (from "Reformation! The Single", 2007)	Smith, Barbato (Note: Credited to Smith, Barbato, Presley and McCord on the 2020 expanded edition.)	6:59
2.	"Over! Over!" (rough mix) (from "Reformation! The Single")	Smith	4:00
3.	"My Door Is Never" (rough mix) (from "Reformation! The Single")	Smith	3:39
4.	"Reformation!" (edit) (from "Reformation! The Single")	Smith, Barbato (Note: Credited to Smith, Barbato, Presley and McCord on the 2020 expanded edition.)	3:55
5.	"Insult Song" (LP version)	Smith, Barbato, Presley, McCord	6:46
6.	"Reformation!" (LP version)	Smith, Barbato (Note: Credited to Smith, Barbato, Presley and McCord on the 2020 expanded edition.)	7:24
7.	"The Wright Stuff" (LP version)	Smith, Barbato, Poulou (Note: Credited to Smith and Poulou on the 2020 expanded edition.)	6:27
8.	"Das Boat" (LP version)	Smith, Barbato, Presley, McCord (Note: Credited to Smith on the 2020 expanded edition.)	8:34
9.	"Fall Sound" (alternative version)	Smith, Barbato, Presley, McCord	4:31
10.	"Onto Insanity" (rough mix)	The Fall	2:15

Disc 3 - early rough mixes 2006

No.	Title	Writer(s)	Length
1.	"Song 2/3 With Tape of Tour Manager"	The Fall	1:35
2.	"The Boss"	Smith, Steve Trafford	2:53
3.	"60's Wack"	The Fall	3:30
4.	"The Vine"	The Fall	3:00
5.	"Blonde"	The Fall	2:16
6.	"Over! Over!"	Smith	4:07
7.	"Reformation!"	Smith, Barbato (Note: Credited to Smith, Barbato, Presley and McCord on the 2020 expanded edition.)	5:09
8.	"Get Out"	Smith	3:16
9.	"Scenario"	Smith, Barbato, Presley, McCord	3:27
10.	"Wed 2"	The Fall	4:44
11.	"Systematic Abuse"	Smith, Barbato, Poulou, Presley, McCord (Note: Credited to Smith on the 2020 expanded edition.)	8:40
12.	"The Wright Stuff"	Smith, Barbato, Poulou (Note: Credited to Smith and Poulou on the 2020 expanded edition.)	3:44

Disc 4 - live at Hammersmith Palais, 1 April 2007 (Previously released as Last Night at The Palais)

No.	Title	Writer(s)	Length
1.	"Senior Twilight Stock Replacer"	Smith, Dave Spurr	4:52
2.	"Pacifying Joint"	Smith	3:35
3.	"Fall Sound"	Smith, Barbato, Presley, McCord	3:56
4.	"Over! Over!"	Smith	3:01
5.	"Theme from Sparta F.C."	Smith, Pritchard, Jim Watts	3:57
6.	"Hungry Freaks, Daddy"	Frank Zappa	5:45
7.	"Wrong Place, Right Time"	Smith	3:02
8.	"My Door Is Never"	Smith	6:29
9.	"The Wright Stuff"	Smith, Barbato, Poulou (Note: Credited to Smith and Poulou on the 2020 expanded edition.)	5:03
10.	"White Lightning"	J.P. Richardson	3:00
11.	"Blindness"	Smith, Spencer Birtwistle	9:14
12.	"Reformation!"	Smith, Barbato (Note: Credited to Smith, Barbato, Presley and McCord on the 2020 expanded edition.)	4:42

== Personnel ==
The Fall

- Mark E. Smith – vocals
- Tim Presley – lead guitar
- Robert Barbato – bass guitar
- Dave Spurr – bass guitar
- Elena Poulou – keyboards; lead vocal on "The Wright Stuff"
- Orpheo McCord – drums, vocals

Additional personnel

- Peter Greenway – rhythm and lead guitar
- Gary Bennett – rhythm guitar
- St. Eitel – "presence"

Technical

- Tim "Gracielands" Baxter – production
- Mark E. Smith – production
- Mark Kenny – cover artwork
- George Shaw – cover artwork
- "Big Head and his wife" – cover artwork
- Becky Stewart – cover artwork
- Edward Teets – cover artwork (US version)
- Bob Gruen – cover photography (US version)
- Andy Pearce – remastering (2020 expanded edition)
