= Kolars =

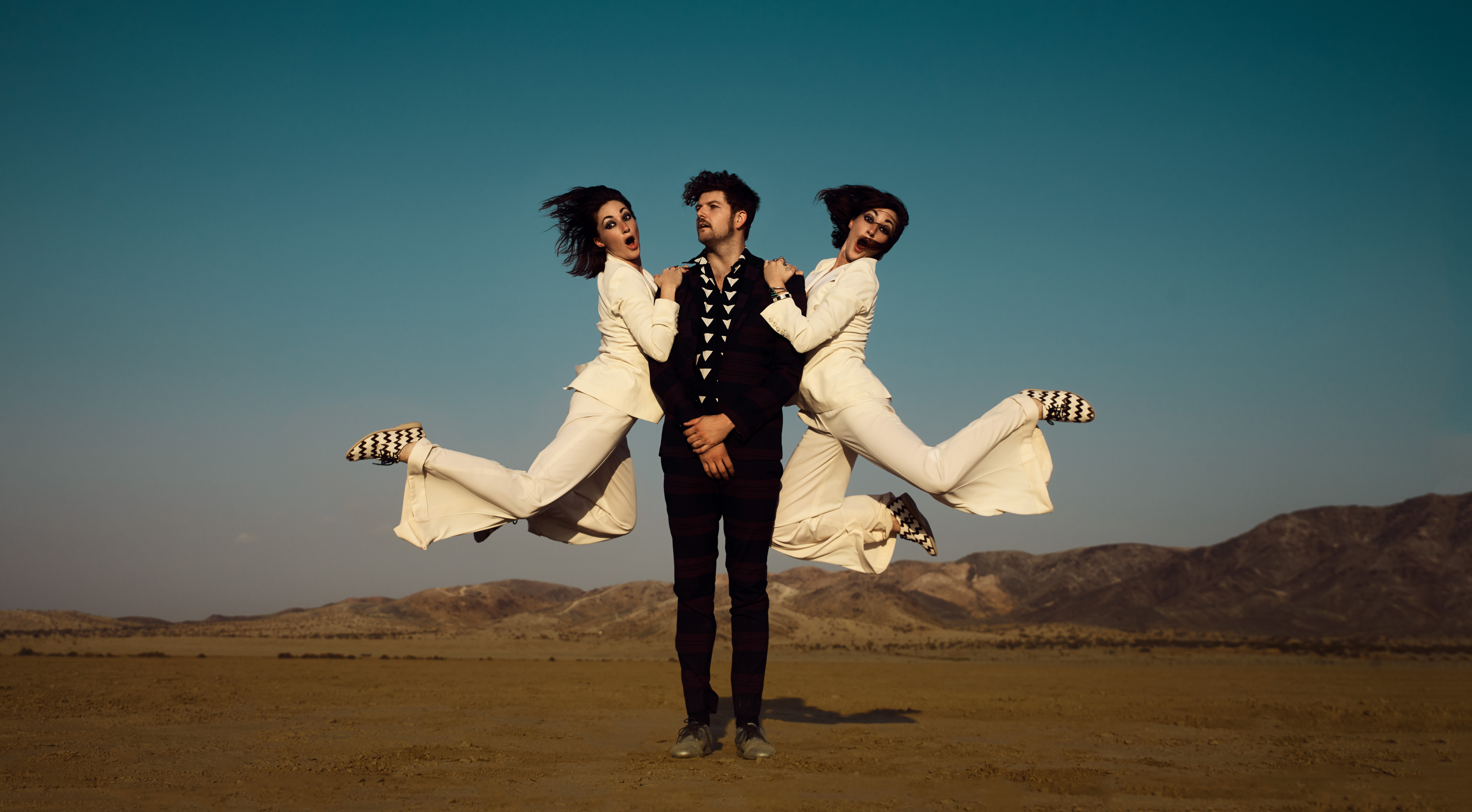
KOLARS, Photographer Jonas Yuan

KOLARS was a Los Angeles-based band founded by then-husband-and-wife Rob Kolar and Lauren Brown, both former members of folk group He's My Brother She's My Sister. Their sound was described as Desert Disco, Space Blues and Glamabilly.

== History ==
In 2017, Kolars' self-titled debut album was released to critical acclaim; The Huffington Post "instantly fell in love with their tantalizing sonics and their energetic apocalyptic marvel", Paste wrote that "KOLARS play their unique blend of 70s glam rock, 90s grunge and twangy country with every inch of their body", and The Denver Post wrote, "KOLARS has a knack for buffing your weathered perspective to a glinting sheen. The world isn't on fire; it's glowing."

The band played over 400 shows, including appearances at several music festivals: SXSW, Treefort Festival, Rolling Stone Weekender, London Calling, Gasparilla, Cornbury, Savannah Stopover, Dot to Dot, The Great Escape. They broke up in 2021.

== Members ==
Lauren Brown is a "tap dancing drummer" known for her invention of that specific percussion style.

Rob Kolar scored TBS' The Detour and is the grandson of British actor Robert Shaw.

== Discography ==
=== Albums ===
List of studio albums, with selected details
Title	Release details
KOLARS	Released: April 7, 2017; Label: Clouds Hill; Formats: LP, CD, digital download, streaming
