= American Story (album) =

Studio album by Bearfoot
- Released: September 27, 2011
- Genres: Bluegrass, contemporary bluegrass, Americana
- Length: 33:21
- Label: Compass
- Producer: Brent Truitt

Bearfoot chronology
Doors and Windows (2009)	American Story (2011)

American Story is the fifth album by Bearfoot, released in 2011.

== Development ==
Between the release of the previous album, Doors and Windows, and the release of American Story, the band went through a line-up change. Long-term members Kate Hamre and Mike Mickelson left, along with lead singer Odessa Jorgensen, and new members Nora Jane Struthers, Todd Grebe, and P.J. George joined the band. Nora Jane Struthers, formerly lead singer of The Bootleggers, took on lead singing and songwriting duties for this album. American Story was the 7th most aired bluegrass album in 2012. The album spent 23 weeks on the Roots Music Report radio airplay chart, 4 weeks at the top.

== Track listing ==
No.	Title	Writer(s)	Length
1.	"Tell Me a Story"	Nora Jane Struthers	2:44
2.	"Feel Free"	N.J. Struthers, Tim O'Brien	3:57
3.	"Midnight in Montana"	Todd Grebe	4:00
4.	"The Dust"	N.J. Struthers	4:01
5.	"Come Get Your Lonesome"	T. Grebe	3:10
6.	"When You're Away"	N.J. Struthers, T. Grebe, Angela Oudean, Jason Norris, P.J. George	3:01
7.	"Eyes Cast Down"	N.J. Struthers, Claire Lynch	3:22
8.	"Kill the Rooster"	N.J. Struthers	2:51
9.	"Billy"	Annalisa Tornfelt	2:09
10.	"Mr. Moonshine"	T. Grebe	4:03
Total length:			33:21

== Personnel ==
Bearfoot

- Nora Jane Struthers – Lead Vocals (except 3, 10), Harmony Vocals (3, 10), Acoustic Guitar (except 6, 9)
- Angela Oudean – Fiddle (except 9), Harmony Vocals (except 3, 9), Lead Vocals (5), Tenor Vocal (9), Violin (1, 4)
- Jason Norris – Mandolin (except 8, 9), Harmony Vocals (3, 10), Bass Vocals (9), Viola (1), Fiddle (8)
- Todd Grebe – Lead Vocals (3, 10), Lead Background Vocal (9), Harmony Vocals (8), Lead Acoustic Guitar (1, 2, 3, 7, 10), Acoustic Guitar (4, 5, 6, 8)
- P.J. George – Harmony Vocals (1, 2, 4, 8, 10), Baritone Vocal (9), Electric Bass (1), Bowed Upright Bass (1), Upright Bass (3, 6, 7, 8, 10), Fender P Bass (2, 4), Bowed Bass (7), Drums (1, 2, 3, 7), Snare Drum (5, 10), Banjo (8), Percussion (8)

Guest musicians

- Brent Truitt – Tambourine (1, 8)
- Charlie Cushman – Banjo (3)
- Jeff Taylor – Accordion (4, 5)
