= Nora Jane Struthers =

American singer-songwriter

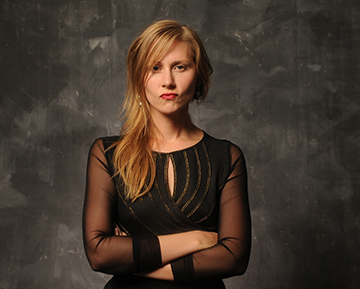

Background information
- Born: November 11, 1983 (age 42); Fairfax, Virginia, U.S.
- Origin: Ridgewood, New Jersey
- Genres: Americana, folk rock, country
- Occupations: Singer, songwriter, band leader
- Instruments: Vocals, guitar
- Years active: 2008–present
- Label: Blue Pig Music
- Website: norajanestruthers.com

Nora Jane Struthers (born November 11, 1983) is an American singer-songwriter based in Nashville who is notable for her critically acclaimed Americana and roots rock. Rolling Stone Country debuted a video for "Let Go" from Struthers' album Wake with an article in which Stephen L. Betts wrote that "the ever-widening scope of Nora Jane Struthers' musicality means that placing a neat, easy label on the genre she best represents is virtually impossible." In a post for Amy Poehler's blog Smart Girls, Alexa Peters wrote that "Nora Jane is entirely and unequivocally herself, and wants to encourage you to do the same." National Public Radio (United States) described Struthers as "quietly brilliant" in article headlined "Country Music's Year of the Woman." Struthers' 2013 album Carnival, recorded with her touring band The Party Line, spent more than three months in the Top 20 of Americana Radio charts and peaked at No. 7. Carnival ranked 24th on the 2013 Americana Airplay Top 100 list. In a review of Carnival, the Tampa Bay Times wrote that Struthers' unique brand of "rich storytelling, repeat-worth melodies and a modern mashup of traditional, bluegrass folk, country and rock influences" sets her apart from many roots-inspired contemporaries.

== Early life and education ==
Struthers was born in Fairfax, Virginia six months before her family moved to Avon, Conn. When Struthers was four years old the family moved again to Ridgewood, New Jersey. She grew up singing and playing music with her father Alan Struthers, a bluegrass musician. Struthers was named Nora by her parents after Nora Charles, a character in Dashiell Hammett's novel The Thin Man, and Jane after English author Jane Austen. Her family called her Jane, but Nora stuck in school when that name was used for calling roll in kindergarten.

Struthers said as a little girl she would often watch out the front window for her father at the end of the day and greet him with a yodel and the two frequented bluegrass festivals and fiddler conventions along the East Coast as she got older.

Struthers was diagnosed with dyslexia at the age of four, when a reading specialist told her parents that Nora Jane would never go to college. She ultimately proved the reading specialist wrong, however, studying English Education and Africana Studies at New York University's School of Education. After graduating in 2005, Struthers worked as a teacher at The Williamsburg Charter High School in Brooklyn, New York until 2008.

== Career ==
Struthers played shows with her father under the name Dirt Road Sweetheart and the duo released an album titled I Heard The Bluebirds Sing on May 11, 2008. In 2008, Struthers gave up her job as a teacher and moved to Nashville to pursue a career as a full-time musician. She soon began touring with a band of rotating musicians she dubbed The Bootleggers and ultimately won the prestigious Telluride Bluegrass Festival band contest in June 2010.

Struthers released a self-titled debut solo album on July 10, 2010. Nora Jane Struthers, produced by Brent Truitt, featured established musicians such as multi-instrumentalist Tim O'Brien and fiddler Stuart Duncan.

Struthers joined Americana acoustic quintet Bearfoot later in 2010 and the group released the album American Story in 2011, which featured six songs written or co-written by Struthers. One of them, "Tell Me a Story," became a top-rated video on CMT.

Struthers had written a collection of songs for a new solo album by 2012 and launched a Kickstarter campaign that raised $22,000 in less than four weeks to help fund it. She formed a touring band called The Party Line and released the 14-track Carnival on April 16, 2013, again produced by Truitt.

Struthers and The Party Line gave nearly 150 live performances across the U.S. in 2013. Struthers said she achieved a childhood dream by playing in the Saturday Night All Star Jam at the Grey Fox Bluegrass Festival in Oak Hill, New York that year.

Struthers and The Party Line released a six-song record titled Country EP No. 1 in July 2014. One of the tracks, a cover of The Everly Brothers classic "(Til) I Kissed You" was featured on a collection of Americana music called Native: Americana Spotlight, released on September 9, 2014 on Tone Tree Music.

Struthers and The Party Line recorded a full-length studio album called Wake, featuring 11 original songs, released in February 2015.

Dirt Road Sweetheart a father-daughter duo (Nora Jane and Alan Struthers) released a new album 'Rose of My Heart' on June 16, 2019 under the label of Blue Pig Music.

In February 2020, Nora announced her fifth studio album titled 'Bright Lights, Long Drives, First Words'.

== Reception ==
Reception Grammy Award-winning musician Tim O'Brien said "Old time music continues to reinvent itself in the able hands of young artists like Nora Jane Struthers."

Kim Ruehl wrote for NPR Music that Struthers has a "voice as sweet as honeysuckle."

A Tampa Bay Times reviewer called Carnival an "Americana gem" writing that "the album never fades through 14 tracks, a testament to the songwriting and musical arrangements."

The video for Struthers' song "Bike Ride" from the album Carnival debuted at No. 1 on Country Music Television Pure's 12-Pack Countdown in November 2013.

== Discography ==
Studio albums

- I Heard The Bluebirds Sing, as Dirt Road Sweetheart, a duo with her father Alan Struthers (2008)
- Nora Jane Struthers (2010)
- Carnival (2013)
- Wake (2015)
- Champion (2017)
- Bright Lights, Long Drives, First Words (2020)
- Back To Cast Iron (2023)

EPs

- Country EP No. 1 (2014)
