= Lauren Brown (drummer) =

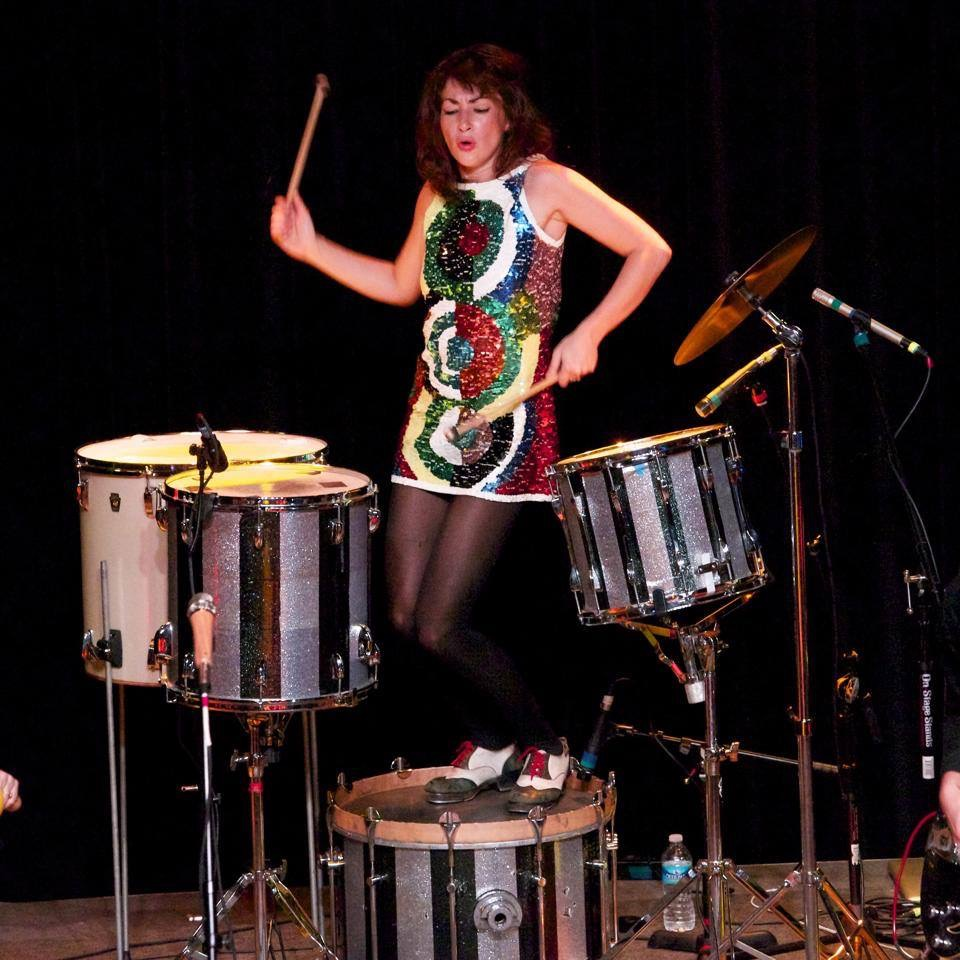
- Brown performing on tour, 2014.

Background information
- Born: Lexington, Massachusetts, U.S.
- Genres: Folk; pop; indie rock; shoegaze
- Occupation: Musician
- Instruments: Drums, percussion, tap dancing
- Years active: 2010–present

Lauren Brown is an American drummer and percussionist best known for inventing tap dancing drumming. She was a founding member of the band Kolars, and is a former member of He's My Brother She's My Sister.

== Early life and education ==
Brown was born and raised in Lexington, Massachusetts, and started tap dancing at the age of 6. She studied performance art and experimental theater at New York University Tisch School of the Arts. In 2026, she began a master's degree program at the Harvard Graduate School of Design.

== Career ==
After graduating from NYU, Brown moved to Los Angeles and joined the folk group He's My Brother She's My Sister as a tap dancer. After the band's drummer quit, Brown became the new drummer in addition to the tap dancer, eventually merging the two skills. As a so-called tap dancing drummer, the first of her kind, Brown wears tap shoes and tap dances on a specially built bass drum turned on its side, while simultaneously playing a drum kit with her arms, on a setup she designed. He's My Brother She's My Sister released a self-titled EP in 2010, and their debut album Nobody Dances in This Town in 2012. Their song "Let's Go" was featured on an episode of MTV's Catfish in 2013. That year, they performed on an episode of The Late Late Show with Craig Ferguson.

In 2016, as the tap dancing drummer, Brown formed the rockabilly glam rock duo Kolars with vocalist and guitarist Rob Kolar, her then-husband. They met as members of He's My Brother She's My Sister. They released their lone, self-titled album in 2017, before splitting up in 2021.

Brown has performed at festivals including Bonnaroo, Summerfest, Firefly Music Festival, Secret Garden Party, and Austin City Limits. In 2021, she played drums with Joy Downer on her single "Over & Out", with Beck on bass, on The Late Late Show with James Corden. The performance was directed by Sam Taylor-Johnson.

== Personal life ==
Brown and Rob Kolar were married in 2014, and divorced in 2021. In 2026, Brown married actor Donal Logue.

== Discography ==
=== Albums ===
==== With He's My Brother She's My Sister ====
- He's My Brother She's My Sister (EP, 2010)
- Nobody Dances in This Town (Park the Van Records, 2012)

==== With Kolars ====
- Kolars (Clouds Hill, 2017)
