= Edward Sharpe and the Magnetic Zeros =

American folk rock band

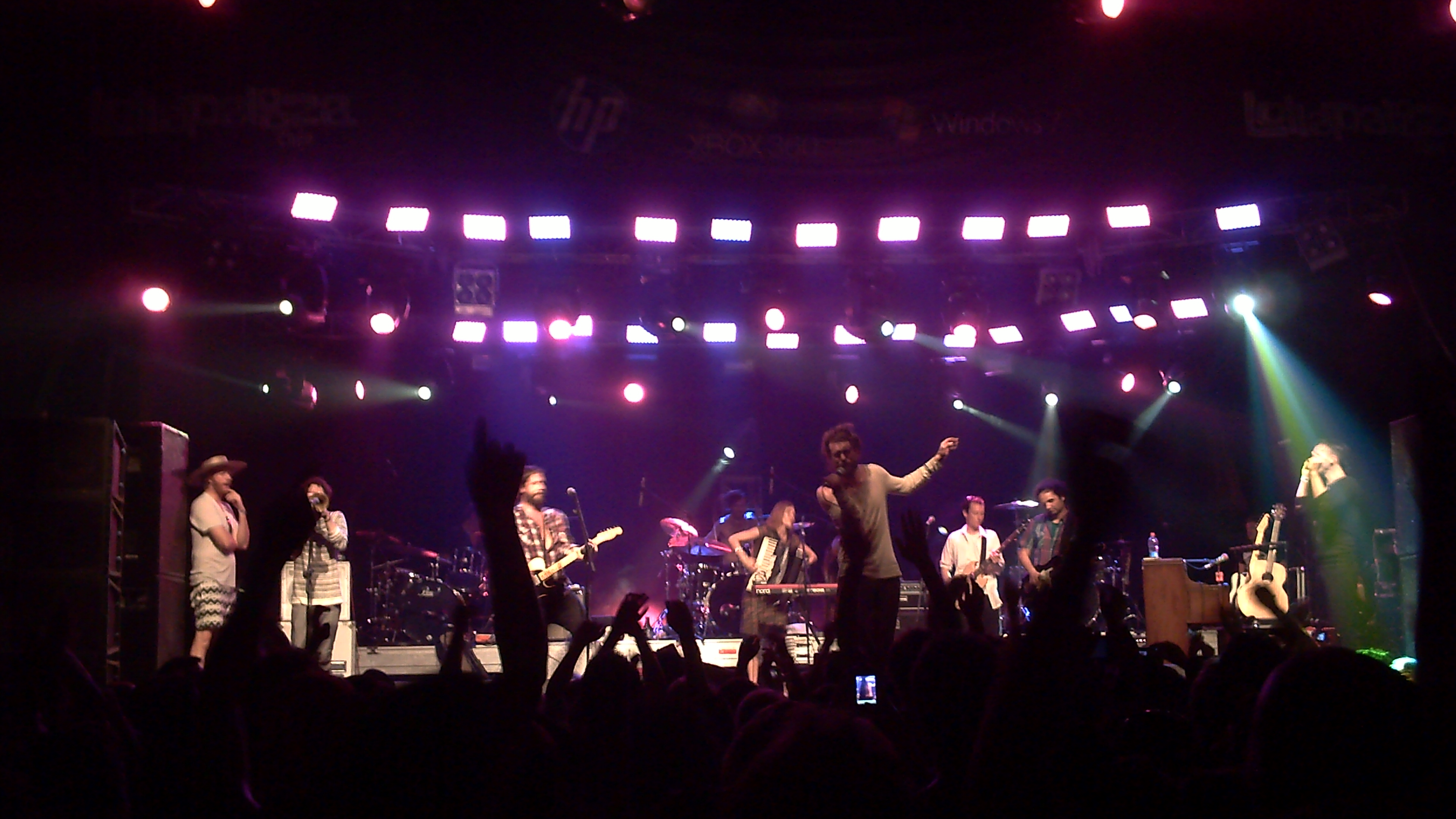
- The band performing at Lollapalooza Chile in 2012

Background information
- Origin: Los Angeles, California, United States
- Genres: Indie folk, psychedelic folk, gospel, neo-psychedelia
- Years active: 2005–2016
- Labels: Rough Trade Records; Communion; Community Music; Dew Process
- Spinoffs: Fool's Gold
- Spinoff of: Ima Robot, Sugarcult
- Past members: Alex Ebert; Nicolo Aglietti; Stewart Cole; Josh Collazo; Orpheo McCord; Christian Letts; Seth Ford-Young; Mark Noseworthy; Crash Richard; Mitchell Yoshida; Jade Castrinos; Aaron Embry; Nora Kirkpatrick; Aaron Older; Tay Strathairn; Felix Bloxsom

Edward Sharpe and the Magnetic Zeros were an American folk rock band formed in Los Angeles, California, in 2005. The group was led by singer Alex Ebert. The band's name is based on a story Ebert wrote in his youth, about a messianic figure named Edward Sharpe. Drawing from roots rock, folk, gospel, and psychedelic music, the band's image and sound evoke the hippie movement of the 1960s and 1970s. The group's first show was played July 18, 2007, at The Troubadour in West Hollywood, California. Their first studio album, Up from Below, was released on July 7, 2009, on Community Records and featured the popular single "Home". The group released their second full-length album, Here, on May 29, 2012, and third album, Edward Sharpe and the Magnetic Zeros, on July 23, 2013. Their fourth studio album, PersonA, was released in April 2016.

The band underwent several alterations. Most notably, singer Jade Castrinos and the band separated in 2014. The band's remaining members were Nicolo Aglietti, Mark Noseworthy, Orpheo McCord, Josh Collazo, Christian Letts, Seth Ford-Young, Mitchell Yoshida, Crash Richard, Stewart Cole, and Alex Ebert. The band also operated Big Sun, a non-profit focused on funding and developing co-ops and land trusts in urban areas around the world. Big Sun donated $100,000 to Avalon Village in Highland Park, Michigan in 2016.

== History ==
=== Origin and first studio album (Up from Below) ===
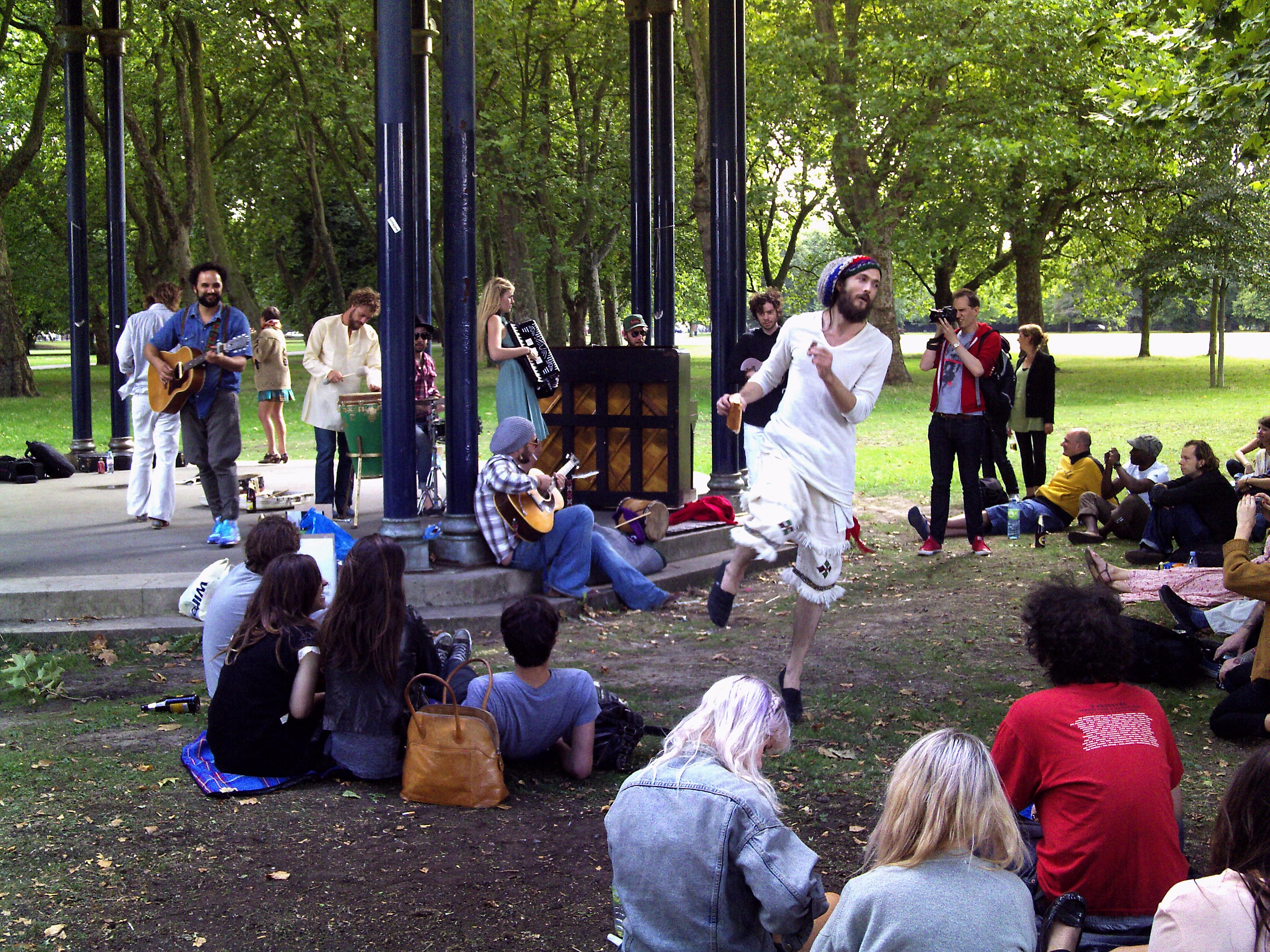
The group performing in Victoria Park, London in August 2009

After years of the Los Angeles party life and subsequent drug addiction, Ima Robot frontman Alex Ebert broke up with his girlfriend, moved out of his house, and spent time in rehabilitation. During this time, Ebert began to write a book about a messianic figure named Edward Sharpe who was "sent down to Earth to kinda heal and save mankind, but he kept getting distracted by girls and falling in love." Ebert adopted the Sharpe persona as his alter ego. He said, "I don't want to put too much weight on it, because in some ways it's just a name that I came up with. But I guess if I look deeper, I do feel like I had lost my identity in general. I really didn't know what was going on or who I was anymore. Adopting another name helped me open up an avenue to get back."

Ebert began initial writing and recording completely alone, doing "the horn lines with [his] mouth or a kazoo on the demos" and "all the background vocals layering ... pretending that there were people there." After meeting singer Jade Castrinos outside a Los Angeles cafe, Ebert and Castrinos started writing music together, and became a part of the art and music collective The Masses, which was partially started by some seed money from actor Heath Ledger. Their fledgling group eventually swelled to more than ten members, some of whom had been Ebert's friends since he was young. In mid-2009, Ebert, Castrinos, and a group of musicians toured the country by bus as Edward Sharpe & the Magnetic Zeros. The first show they played in 2009 was at the Marfa Film Festival in Marfa, Texas. The band recorded their debut album, Up from Below, in Laurel Canyon. Produced by Nicolo Aglietti and Aaron Older, it was released on July 14, 2009. Up from Below is also the name of one of the songs in this album, in which Ebert states "I was only five/when my dad told me I'd die/I cried as he said son/ was nothing could be done". Says Ebert, "My dad would be doing therapy in his office upstairs and I'd hear screamings, because they'd be role-playing and he'd be acting as his patient's father and they'd get upset and hit him and all this stuff. When he wasn't working, I'd go up there to draw and one day the music he was playing, Beethoven I think, delivered to me the idea of life and death. The information was bequeathed to me by the music. It was sonic and emotional. I tapped my dad on the shoulder and asked him if I was going to die and he said, 'Yeah.'"

On April 12, 2009, the band released "Desert Song", a music video and the first of a 12-part feature-length musical called SALVO!. Part 2, "Kisses Over Babylon", was released November 24, 2009, through Spinner.com. Part 3, "40 Day Dream", was uploaded to YouTube by the band on May 19, 2011.

=== Big Easy Express and second studio album (Here) ===
In April 2011, the band joined Mumford & Sons and Old Crow Medicine Show on the Railroad Revival Tour. According to American Songwriter, the tour stopped in six cities, playing alternative venues such as an Austin, Texas, high school where Mumford & Sons taught the marching band how to play their hit "The Cave". The tour was also the subject of Grammy-nominated director Emmett Malloy's latest documentary Big Easy Express, which strove to capture "the pure joy of music" through Americana folk imagery. The documentary went on to win in the category for Best Long Form Music Video at the 2013 Grammy Awards. In 2011, Railroad Revival Tour bands Mumford & Sons, Edward Sharpe and the Magnetic Zeros, and Old Crow Medicine Show together closed their shows at every stop with "This Train".

The group's second album, Here, was released on May 29, 2012.

=== Third studio album (Edward Sharpe & The Magnetic Zeros) ===
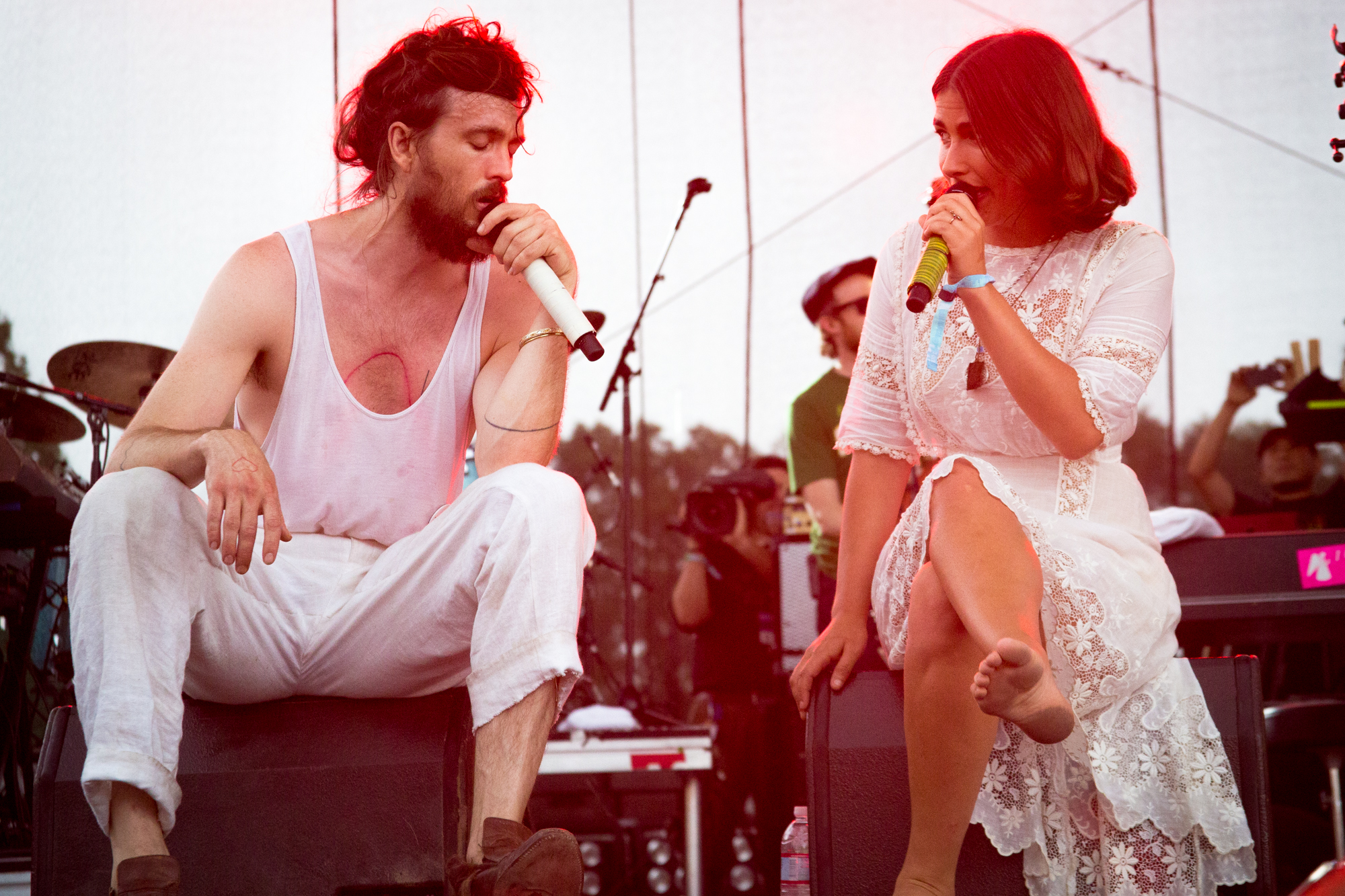
Alex Ebert with Jade Castrinos at Bonnaroo in 2013

The band's third album, Edward Sharpe and the Magnetic Zeros, was released in 2013. This was followed by tours of North America, UK, Europe, and Australia, which included headlining concert dates as well as major festivals. The band became known for taking people onstage with them, including a former patient they had previously met in a hospital performance, and a disabled man in a wheelchair.

=== Fourth studio album (PersonA) ===
The band's fourth studio album, PersonA, was released April 15, 2016, through Community Music. Recording the music almost entirely in one room together in New Orleans, their approach was a far cry from their ramshackle, come-one-come-all production audible on recordings of their previous albums.

In an in-depth interview with Transverso Media, Ebert explained his desire to evolve on PersonA, stating, "In a lot of ways this album does things that are missing." He went on to discuss why the name Edward Sharpe is crossed out on the cover, saying, "There was no character to begin with, so why not kill him? He never really was there. If anything, and at most, Edward Sharpe was a vehicle for me to get to slough off whatever I had become up until that point, and to get back to or sort of allow my pure self to come forth into sort of a clean slate."

== Members ==
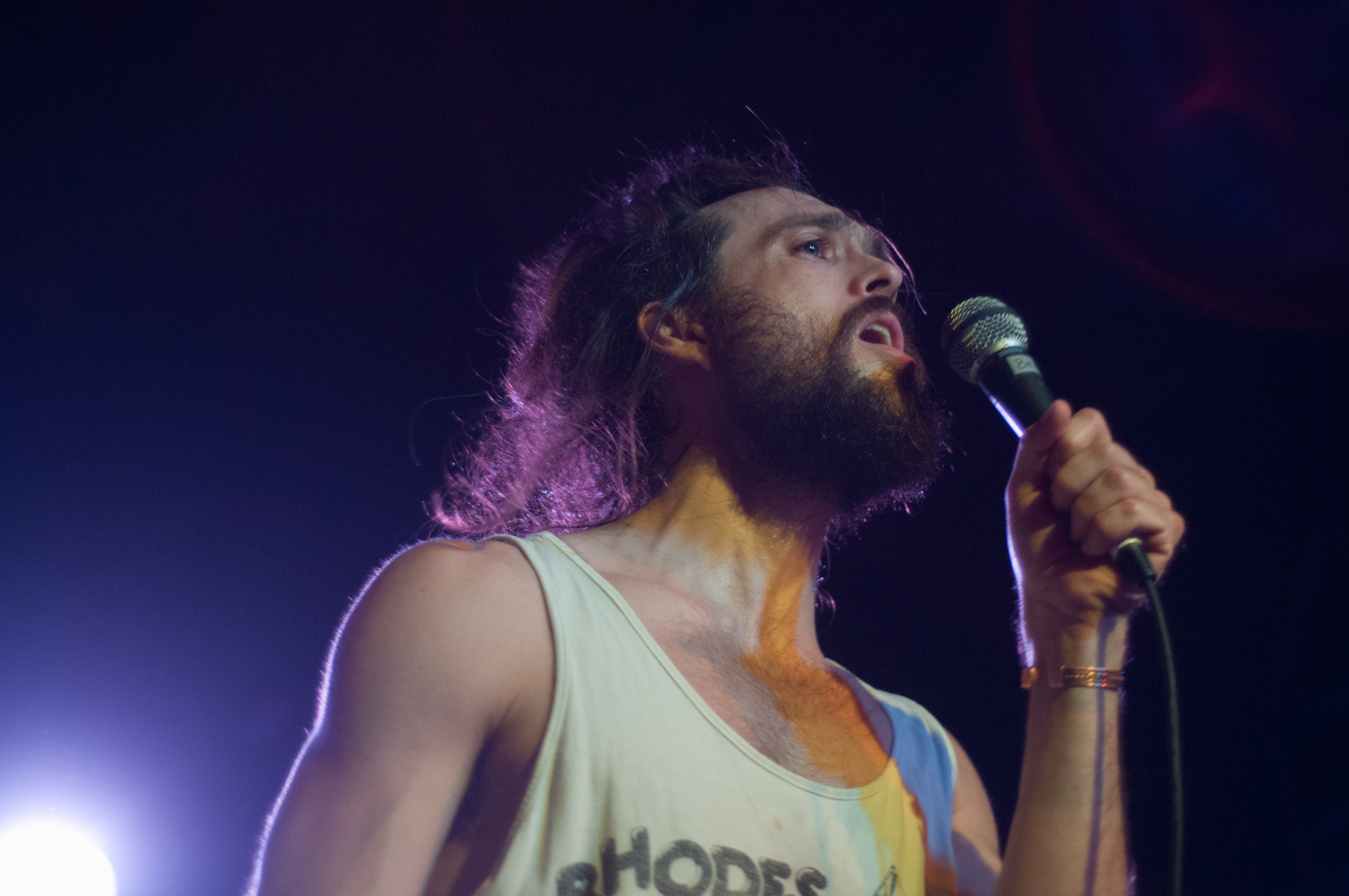
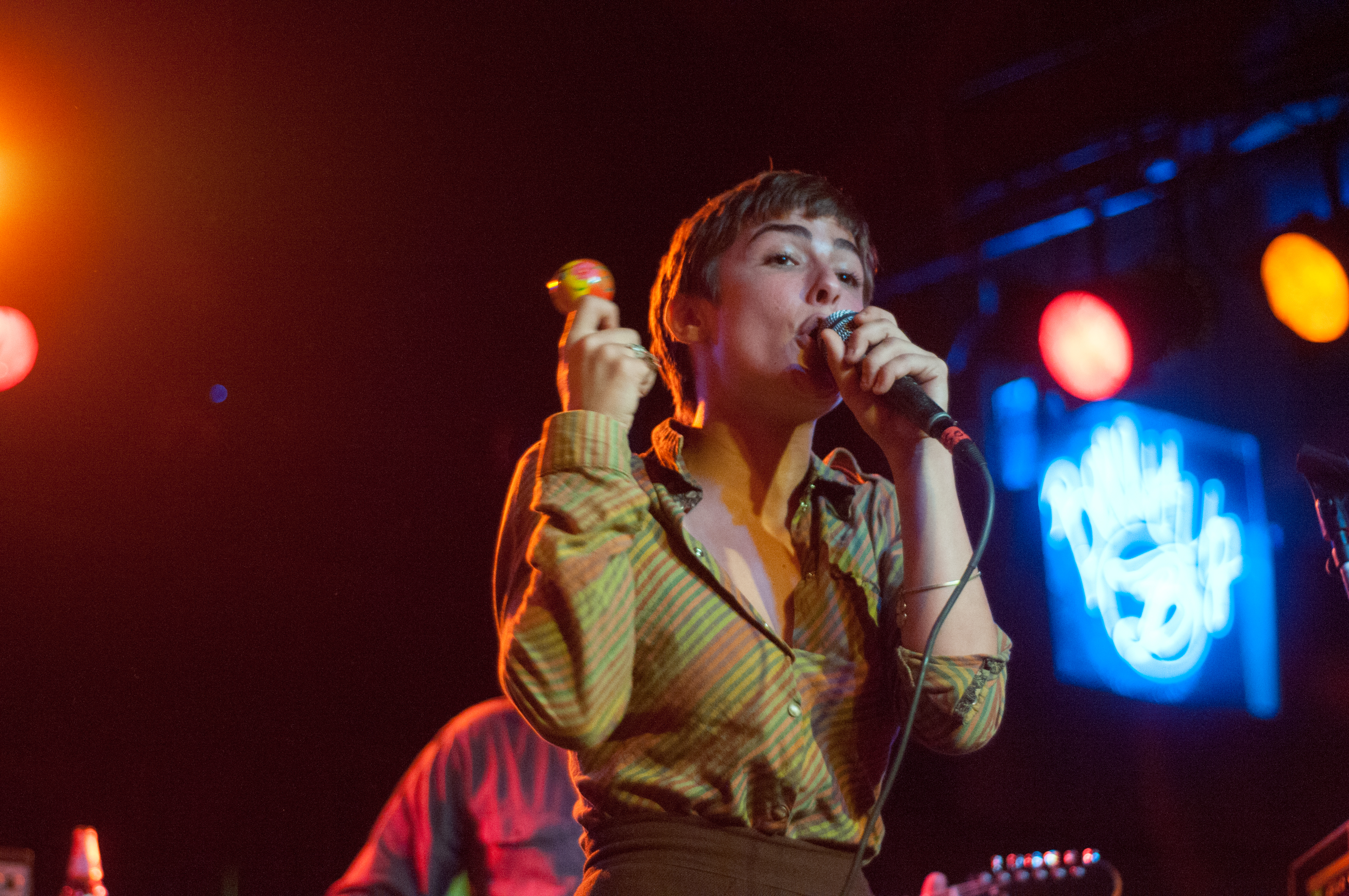
Alex Ebert and Jade Castrinos made up the singing core of the band for years
- Alex Ebert – vocals, guitar, percussion, piano
- Nicolo Aglietti – guitar and co-producer; synthesizer, keyboards, vocals
- Stewart Cole – trumpet, percussion, keyboards, tenor ukulele, vocals
- Josh Collazo – drums, percussion, saxophone, vocals
- Orpheo McCord – drums, percussion, marimba, didgeridoo, vocals
- Christian Letts – guitar, vocals, mandolin
- Seth Ford-Young – bass, vocals
- Mark Noseworthy – guitar, vocals, banjo, mandolin, charango, ronroco
- Crash Richard – vocals, percussion

As of marketing on the band's Facebook page in 2013:

- Mitchell Yoshida – piano, clavinet, vocals

=== Additional, touring and/or recording personnel ===
As listed in the iTunes LP for the most recent album, Edward Sharpe and the Magnetic Zeros, 2013:

- Aaron Arntz – piano; previously also clavinet, vocals as a main band member
- Aaron Embry – piano, organs; previously keyboards, piano, vocals, harmonica as a main band member
- Roger Joseph Manning Jr – piano
- Nathaniel Markman – fiddler
- Fred Bows – violin
- Susie Bows – violin
- Hippos August – humming, moaning, Surbahar

Others listed prior to 2013:

- Aaron Older – co-producer, bass, vocals, banjo, percussion
- Tay Strathairn – piano, harmonica, vocals
- Jade Castrinos – vocals, guitar, percussion, keyboard
- Nora Kirkpatrick – accordion, keyboard, vocals
- Odessa Jorgensen – fiddle, vocals during 2012-2013 tour
- Anna Bulbrook – viola, vocals
- Tyler James – piano, vocals
- Felix Bloxsom – drums
- Adam Privitera – penny whistler
- Pat Hicks - steel drum, humming, penny whistler
- Ryan Richter – guitar, lap steel

== Discography ==
=== Studio albums ===
Title	Details	Peak chart positions									
Title	Details	US	US Indie	AUS	BEL (FL)	BEL (WA)	CAN	FRA	IRL	NLD	UK
Up from Below	Release date: July 7, 2009; Label: Vagrant, Rough Trade; Formats: CD, LP, digital download	76	13	86	175	176	—	—	94	—	52
Here	Release date: May 29, 2012; Label: Vagrant, Rough Trade; Formats: CD, LP, digital download	5	1	37	—	—	9	97	—	—	170
Edward Sharpe and the Magnetic Zeros	Release date: July 23, 2013; Label: Vagrant, Rough Trade	14	2	24	—	—	10	—	74	97	51
PersonA	Release date: April 15, 2016; Label: Community Music Group	130	12	—	—	—	57	—	—	—	—
"—" denotes releases that did not chart or have not been released in that region

=== EPs ===
- Here Comes EP (2009)

=== Singles ===
Year	Single	Peak chart positions										Album
Year	Single	US	US Rock	AUS	BEL (FL)	BEL (WA)	FRA	IRL	NLD	SWI	UK	Album
2009	"40 Day Dream/Geez Louise"	—	—	—	—	—	—	—	—	—	—	Up from Below
2010	"Home"	—	39	40	39	64	7	57	27	41	50	Up from Below
2010	"Memory of a Free Festival"	—	—	—	—	—	—	—	—	—	—	We Were So Turned On: A Tribute to David Bowie
2010	"Chickens in Love"	—	—	—	—	—	—	—	—	—	—	Non-album singles
2011	"Home" (Party Supplies Remix)	—	—	—	—	—	—	—	19	—	—	Non-album singles
2012	"That's What's Up"	—	—	—	—	—	—	—	—	—	—	Here
2012	"One Love to Another"	— (Note: "One Love to Another" did not enter the Billboard Hot 100, but peaked at number 18 on the Hot Singles Sales chart.)	—	—	—	—	—	—	—	—	—	Here
2012	"Man on Fire"	— (Note: "Man on Fire" did not chart on the Billboard Hot 100 but did peak at number 23 on the Bubbling Under Hot 100 Singles chart, which is an extension of the Billboard Hot 100.)	— (Note: "Man on Fire" did not enter the Rock Songs chart, but peaked at number 23 on the Rock Digital Songs chart.)	—	—	—	—	—	—	—	—	Here
2013	"Better Days"	—	— (Note: "Better Days" did not enter the Rock Songs chart, but peaked at number 21 on the Triple A Airplay chart.)	—	109	—	—	—	—	—	—	Edward Sharpe and the Magnetic Zeros
2013	"Life Is Hard"	—	—	—	—	—	—	—	—	—	—	Edward Sharpe and the Magnetic Zeros
2016	"Hot Coals"	—	—	—	—	—	—	—	—	—	—	PersonA
2016	"No Love Like Yours"	—	— (Note: "No Love Like Yours" did not enter the Rock Songs chart, but peaked at number 29 on the Triple A Airplay chart.)	—	—	—	—	—	—	—	—	PersonA
"—" denotes releases that did not chart

=== Other charted songs ===
Year	Title	US Sales	Album
2012	"Give Me a Sign"	9	Edward Sharpe and the Magnetic Zeros
