= Only Time Knows =

Studio album by Bearfoot Bluegrass
- Released: February 2001
- Studios: Surreal Studios, Anchorage, Alaska
- Genre: Bluegrass
- Length: 37:35
- Label: self published

Bearfoot Bluegrass chronology
Only Time Knows (2001)	Back Home (2003)

Only Time Knows is the debut album by Bearfoot Bluegrass, released in February 2001.

== Development ==
Bearfoot Bluegrass was more of a music camp band than a festival performing band when they went to Surreal Studio in Anchorage and cut Only Time Knows, assembled without a producer. The group also had to fundraise their first album through the sponsorships of BP Exploration Alaska and Era Aviation. Bearfoot Bluegrass went on to win the Telluride Bluegrass band contest in June the same year. The band members were 16–19 years old when they created their first album and won the Telluride band contest. The album was first recorded in January 2001 while they performed at the Anchorage Folk Festival, and then had a release the next month before having a wider release the following March.

== Chart performance and sales ==
In the week of April 13, 2000, the album debuted at #6 in the band's hometown of Anchorage. In the week of September 28, 2001, their album ended up topping their local charts. By January 2002, the album sold over 3,000 units.

== Track listing ==
No.	Title	Writer(s)	Length
1.	"True Life Blues"	Bill Monroe	2:07
2.	"Boston Boy"	B. Monroe	2:51
3.	"When You Say Nothing at All"	Paul Overstreet, Don Schlitz	3:59
4.	"Wheel Hoss"	B. Monroe	2:36
5.	"Lonesome City"	Annalisa Woodlee	4:00
6.	"Sittin' Alone in the Moonlight"	B. Monroe	3:14
7.	"Telluride"	David Grisman	2:16
8.	"Only Time Knows"	A. Woodlee	2:31
9.	"Everyday I Have to Cry"	Arthur Alexander, Jr.	2:26
10.	"In the Palm of Your Hand"	Ron Block	3:41
11.	"I'll Be True"	Gene Autry	2:31
12.	"Cry, Cry, Darlin'"	Jimmy C. Newman, J.D. Miller	2:41
13.	"Opus 38"	D. Grisman	2:42
Total length:			37:35

== Personnel ==
Bearfoot Bluegrass

- Angela Oudean – Vocals, fiddle
- Annalisa Woodlee – Vocals, fiddle
- Malani O'Toole – Vocals, fiddle, guitar
- Jason Norris – Vocals, mandolin
- Kate Hamre – Acoustic bass
- Mike Mickelson – Lead guitar, rhythm guitar

Production

- Kristi Olson – Recorded by, engineered
