= Follow Me (Bearfoot album) =

Studio album by Bearfoot
- Released: July 21, 2006
- Genre: Bluegrass, Americana
- Length: 40:36
- Label: Glacier Records
- Producer: Gene Libbea

Bearfoot chronology
Back Home (2003)	Follow Me (2006)	Doors and Windows (2009)

Follow Me is the third album by Bearfoot, released in 2006.

== Development ==
The album was the first the group released under their new name of Bearfoot, while their first two albums were released under the name of Bearfoot Bluegrass. According to Bearfoot's mandolin player Jason Norris, they shortened their name to reflect the band's present sound. "We'd never had a banjo in the band and it was hard to call ourselves a traditional bluegrass band.". The band showcases warm ensemble playing, featuring three part vocal harmony, and intertwined twin-fiddle leads. All five musicians take turns singing, sometimes in harmony, sometimes solo, backed by fiddles, guitar, and mandolin. The album was cut live, meaning the rhythm track was recorded in a big room with everyone in the circle. The twin fiddles had to be recorded live because they played off of each other. The solo parts were left out of the rhythm track, and filled in later. Annalisa sang live lead vocals on a few of the tracks. Annalisa Tornfelt stands out on this album with her voice and song writing.

== Track listing ==
All tracks are written by Annalisa Tornfelt except where noted. All songs were arranged by Bearfoot with some help from Gene Libbea.

No.	Title	Writer(s)	Length
1.	"Molasses"		2:20
2.	"Go on Home"		3:35
3.	"Follow Me"		1:56
4.	"Sweet Pea"		5:59
5.	"Deep River Blues"	Alton Delmore, adapted by Doc Watson	2:44
6.	"Just Stay"		4:54
7.	"Easier Days"	Jason Norris	3:48
8.	"Village Idiot" (instrumental)		2:26
9.	"The Most Lonely" (instrumental)		3:14
10.	"The Blackest Crow"	traditional	3:37
11.	"Little Bird"	Becky Buller	3:30
12.	"Sold My Soul to an Angel"		2:33
Total length:			40:36

== Personnel ==
Bearfoot

- Annalisa Tornfelt – Lead Vocals (1, 2, 3, 4, 6, 9), Baritone Vocals (10), High Baritone Vocals, Fiddle (right), Guitar (4, 9)
- Angela Oudean – Baritone Vocals (1), Tenor Vocals (5, 7), Fiddle (left), Fiddle (4)
- Kate Hamre – Lead Vocals (10), Baritone Vocals (3), Tenor Vocals, Acoustic Bass
- Mike Mickelson – Lead Vocals (5), Guitar (3)
- Jason Norris – Lead Vocals (7), Baritone Vocals (6), Mandolin
