= Here Comes =

Here Comes EP

EP by Edward Sharpe and the Magnetic Zeros
- Released: May 19, 2009 (digital only)
- Length: 12:13
- Label: Vagrant Records

Edward Sharpe and the Magnetic Zeros chronology
Here Comes EP (2009)	Up from Below (2009)

Here Comes EP is an EP from the album Up from Below by Edward Sharpe and the Magnetic Zeros. It was released in May 2009.

== Track listings ==
All tracks are written by Edward Sharpe and the Magnetic Zeros.

Up from Below
No.	Title	Length
1.	"40 Day Dream"	3:54
2.	"Janglin"	3:50
3.	"Carries On"	4:31
