= Home (Edward Sharpe and the Magnetic Zeros song) =

Single by Edward Sharpe and the Magnetic Zeros

from the album Up from Below
- Released: January 2010
- Genre: Indie folk; country folk
- Length: 5:06
- Label: Rough Trade, Community
- Songwriters: Jade Castrinos; Alex Ebert
- Producers: Nicolo Aglietti, Aaron Older, Edward Sharpe

Edward Sharpe and the Magnetic Zeros singles chronology
| "40 Day Dream/Geez Louise" (2009) | "Home" (2010) | "Memory of a Free Festival" (2010) |

Music video
- "Home” on YouTube

"Home" is a song written and recorded by American group Edward Sharpe and the Magnetic Zeros. It was released in January 2010 as the second single from the album, Up from Below (2009). The song came in at number 73 on Australian radio station Triple J's 100 hottest songs of the past 20 years.

== Song ==
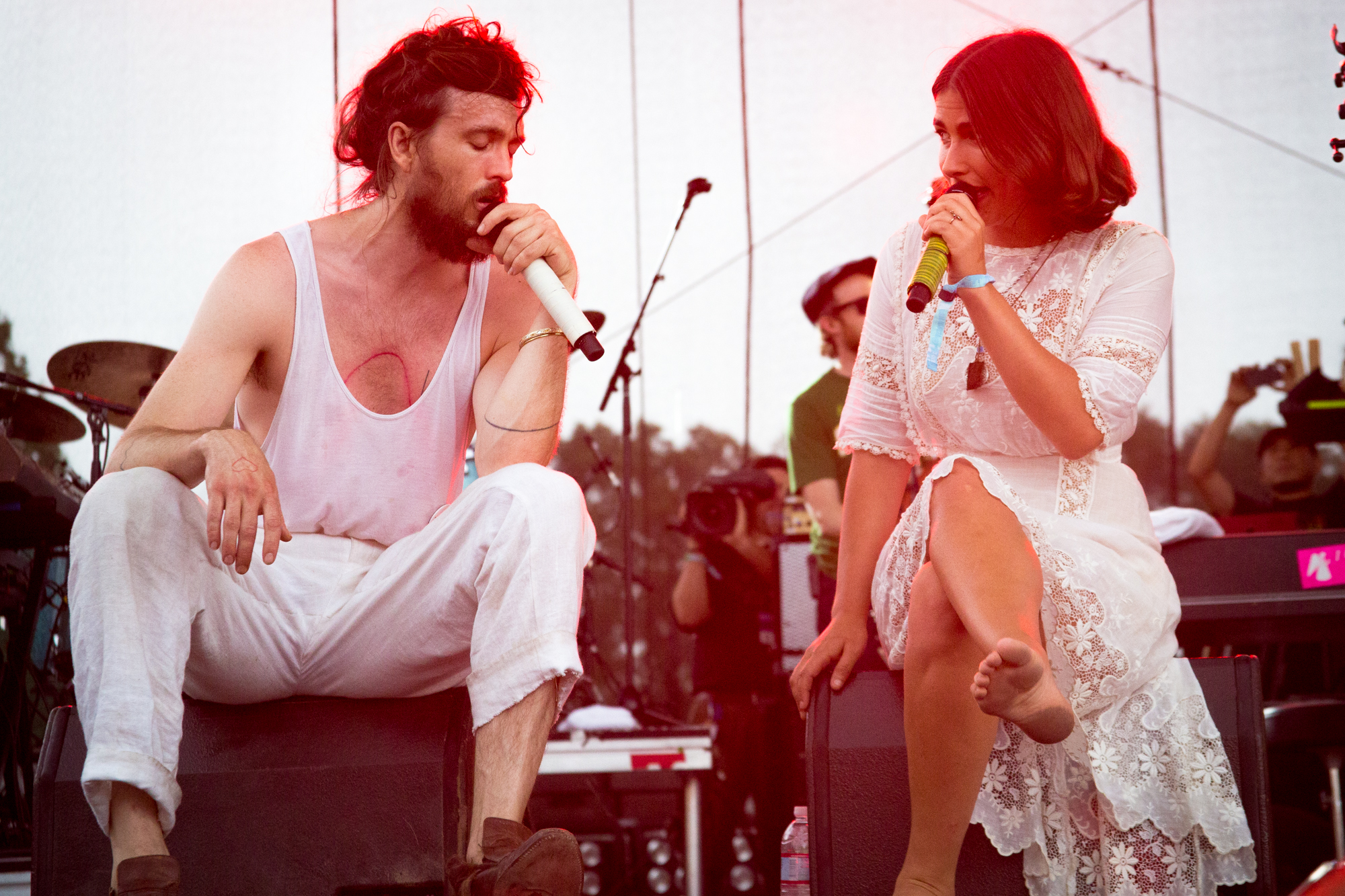
Alex Ebert and Jade Castrinos shared the vocals on the original recording of "Home"

The song is a duet between Alex Ebert and Jade Castrinos, with portions of spoken word from both. Whistling is prominent in the song, totaling three minutes including the opening melody. Instruments include guitar, piano, and trumpet.

== Track listing ==
All tracks are written by Edward Sharpe and the Magnetic Zeros.

Home
| No. | Title | Length |
|---|---|---|
| 1. | "Home (radio edit)" | 3:16 |
| 2. | "Home" | 5:06 |

== Music video ==
A music video for the song features a selection of clips of the band on tour in Australia. It was made by Ryan Gall, with cinematography from Gall, Petey Klein, Stephen Frizza and Hamish Siddins.

== Charts ==
=== Weekly charts ===
| Chart (2010) | Peak position |
|---|---|
| Australia (ARIA) | 40 |
| US Billboard Alternative Songs | 25 |
| Chart (2011) | Peak position |
| Netherlands (Dutch Top 40) | 27 |
| Sweden (Sverigetopplistan) | 52 |
| Chart (2013) | Peak position |
| Austria (Ö3 Austria Top 40) | 56 |
| Belgium (Ultratop 50 Flanders) | 39 |
| Belgium (Ultratip Bubbling Under Wallonia) | 18 |
| France (SNEP) | 7 |
| Ireland (IRMA) | 57 |
| Scottish Singles Sales (Official Charts) | 40 |
| Spain (Promusicae) | 46 |
| Switzerland (Schweizer Hitparade) | 41 |
| UK Singles (Official Charts) | 50 |
| UK Indie (Official Charts) | 5 |

=== Year-end charts ===
| Chart (2011) | Position |
|---|---|
| Sweden (Sverigetopplistan) | 84 |
| Chart (2013) | Position |
| France (SNEP) | 83 |

== Certifications ==
| Region | Certification | Certified units/sales |
|---|---|---|
| Australia (ARIA) | Platinum | 70,000^{^} |
| Denmark (IFPI Danmark) | Gold | 45,000^{‡} |
| Italy (FIMI) | Platinum | 50,000^{‡} |
| New Zealand (RMNZ) | 3× Platinum | 90,000^{‡} |
| Spain (Promusicae) | Gold | 30,000^{‡} |
| United Kingdom (BPI) | 2× Platinum | 1,200,000^{‡} |
| United States (RIAA) | Platinum | 1,000,000^{‡} |
^{^} Shipments figures based on certification alone.^{‡} Sales+streaming figures based on certification alone.

== Reception ==
In 2025, Alex Ebert responded to retrospective criticism of the song, after some commentators had called it "the worst song ever written". He argued that the structure of song was fundamentally good and that was evidenced by the various cover versions and changes others had made to it and it still held up. He qualified that it may not be a well recorded song as it had been recorded on tape. He accepted the muffled quality of the audio, saying they had wanted to capture the happenstance incidental quality of the band. Ebert also noted that the song came before the folk pop sound was more widely popularized by other bands such as The Lumineers and Of Monsters and Men.
