= Edward Sharpe and the Magnetic Zeros (album) =

Studio album by Edward Sharpe and the Magnetic Zeros
- Released: July 23, 2013
- Length: 56:57
- Labels: Vagrant; Rough Trade; Communion; Gentleman of the Road
- Producer: Alex Ebert

Edward Sharpe and the Magnetic Zeros chronology
Here (2012)	Edward Sharpe and the Magnetic Zeros (2013)	PersonA (2016)

Singles from Edward Sharpe and the Magnetic Zeros
- 1. "Better Days" Released: 20 May 2013; 2. "Life Is Hard" Released: 16 September 2013

Edward Sharpe and the Magnetic Zeros is the third album by Edward Sharpe and the Magnetic Zeros. It was released on July 23, 2013, in North America and was released on July 29, 2013, around the world through Vagrant Records, Rough Trade Records and Communion Records. Frontman Alex Ebert stated that "These songs mean everything to me – It's the rawest, most liberated, most rambunctious stuff we've done."

On May 22, 2013, Edward Sharpe and the Magnetic Zeros posted "Better Days", the first single from the upcoming album on their SoundCloud and Tumblr pages.

On July 15, 2013, the band made the whole album available for streaming online through NPR.

The band uploaded a music video for their second single, "Life Is Hard", on their YouTube channel on September 19, 2013. The music video, filmed in The Box Theatre in New York, was performed in front of a live audience on August 25, 2013.

== Reception ==
Professional ratings
Aggregate scores
Source	Rating
Metacritic	61/100
Review scores
Source	Rating
AllMusic	3/5 stars
Consequence of Sound	3.5/5 stars

On Metacritic, which assigns a rating out of 100 to reviews from mainstream critics, Edward Sharpe and the Magnetic Zeros holds an average score of 61, based on 21 reviews, indicating "generally favorable reviews".

The album debuted at No. 14 on the Billboard 200, and No. 1 on the Folk Albums chart, selling around 18,000 copies in its first week. It has sold 60,000 copies as of March 2016.

== Track listing ==
No.	Title	Writer(s)	Length
1.	"Better Days"	Alex Ebert, Nico Aglietti	4:25
2.	"Let's Get High"	Ebert	6:30
3.	"Two"	Ebert, Seth Ford-Young, Mark Noseworthy	3:27
4.	"Please!"	Ebert, Castrinos, Aglietti	3:32
5.	"Country Calling"	Ebert	3:30
6.	"Life Is Hard"	Jade Castrinos, Ebert	3:30
7.	"If I Were Free"	Ebert, Josh Collazo, Ford-Young, Noseworthy	5:37
8.	"In the Lion"	Ebert	4:33
9.	"They Were Wrong"	Ebert	3:42
10.	"In the Summer"	Ebert	3:35
11.	"Remember to Remember"	Castrinos, Stewart Cole, Ebert	4:22
12.	"This Life"	Ebert, Aglietti	5:59

Deluxe edition bonus tracks
No.	Title	Length
13.	"Give Me a Sign"	5:03
14.	"When You're Young"	4:15
15.	"Milton"	3:18

== Personnel ==
- Alex Ebert – vocals, acoustic guitar, electric guitar, percussion, string arrangements, keyboards, electric bass, basketball, melodica
- Jade Castrinos – vocals, acoustic guitar, tambourine
- Christian Letts – electric and acoustic guitar, 12 string guitar, mandolin, marching bass drum, vocals
- Stewart Cole – trumpet, synths, piano, alto horn, flugelhorn, baritone horn, cornet, hammond and lowrey organs, Wurlitzer, clavinet, pump organ, recorder, vocals
- Mark Noseworthy – electric and acoustic guitar, 11 string guitar, ronrocco, tenor banjo, slide guitar, electric 12-string guitar, mandolin, vocals
- Crash – vocals
- Orpheo McCord – percussion, drums, marimba, vocals
- Nora Kirkpatrick – accordion, organ, keys, omnichord, vocals
- Josh Collazo – drums, concert toms, percussion, alto saxophone, vocals
- Seth Ford-Young – electric bass, upright bass, vocals

With:

- Aaron Arntz – piano on "Better Days" and "If I Were Free"
- Nico Algietti – electric guitar on "Remember to Remember", "Please", acoustic on "Life Is Hard"
- Roger Joseph Manning Jr. – piano on "Life Is Hard"
- Aaron Embry – piano and organ solo on "This Life"
- Nathaniel Markman – violin on "They Were Wrong" and "Remember to Remember"
- Fred Bows and Susie Park – violins on "Two", "Life Is Hard", and "In the Lion"
- Matt Linesch – engineer/mixer

== Charts ==
Chart (2013)	Peak position
Australian Albums (ARIA)	24
Canadian Albums (Billboard)	10
Dutch Albums (Album Top 100)	97
Irish Albums (IRMA)	74
UK Albums (OCC)	51
US Billboard 200	14
US Americana/Folk Albums	1
US Independent Albums	2
US Rock Albums	3
US Tastemaker Albums	3
