= Imperial Wax Solvent =

Studio album by The Fall
- Released: 28 April 2008 (UK)
- Recorded: May–June 2007, St. Martin Ton Studio, Duesseldorf; Late 2007, Gracielands Studio, Rochdale
- Genre: Alternative rock
- Length: 47:10
- Label: Sanctuary
- Producer: Grant Showbiz; Mark E. Smith; Andi Toma; Tim Baxter

The Fall chronology
Reformation Post TLC (2007)	Imperial Wax Solvent (2008)	Last Night at The Palais (2010)

Professional ratings
Aggregate scores
Source	Rating
Metacritic	81/100
Review scores
Source	Rating
AllMusic	4/5 stars
Drowned in Sound	8/10
The Guardian	4/5 stars
The Independent	4/5 stars
Mojo	4/5 stars
Pitchfork	7.5/10
Q	3/5 stars
Record Collector	5/5 stars
Uncut	4/5 stars

Imperial Wax Solvent is the 26th studio album by the Fall, released in the UK on 28 April 2008.

The album featured a new British-based lineup after the departures of the American musicians who had been recruited to salvage a 2006 tour of the US and subsequently appeared on 2007's Reformation Post TLC. Frontman Mark E. Smith, keyboardist Elena Poulou and bassist Dave Spurr remain from the previous incarnation. They were joined on Imperial by guitarist Pete Greenway (a guest guitarist on the previous album) and drummer Keiron Melling. Spurr, Greenway and Melling would prove to be the band's most stable lineup, enduring for six studio albums until Smith's death in 2018.

It was the first Fall album since 2001's Are You Are Missing Winner to have been turned around in a year. An album a year was always the norm for the group in the past but this practice slipped in the period 2001–2007 (2006 was the first year since the group's inception that saw the emergence of no new material at all, with a cover of the Monks' "Higgledy Piggledy" from the tribute album Silver Monk Time being the only recorded appearance).

Imperial Wax Solvent was also the first studio album since Are You Are Missing Winner to make prominent use of the low-fi production techniques which were previously one of the Fall's hallmarks: the Groundhogs cover "Strangetown" has noticeable skips, and certain tracks on the album are presented in mono.

== Reception and release ==
The album was well-received by critics, scoring an 81/100 on Metacritic. The album entered the UK album chart at #35, the Fall's first time on the Top 40 since 1993's The Infotainment Scan reached #9.

The album received some press attention when, due to a pressing error, the music of the album was recorded onto the first shipment of Faryl Smith's debut album Faryl.

Imperial Wax Solvent was reissued by Cherry Red Records on limited edition translucent yellow vinyl for Record Store Day 2019 and as an expanded 3CD edition in 2020.

== Track listing ==
No.	Title	Writer(s)	Length
1.	"Alton Towers"	Mark E. Smith, David Spurr	3:29
2.	"Wolf Kidult Man"	Smith, Spurr, Eleni Poulou	3:02
3.	"50 Year Old Man"	Smith, Spurr	11:36
4.	"I've Been Duped"	Smith	2:44
5.	"Strangetown"	T.S. McPhee	5:41
6.	"Taurig"	Poulou	2:59
7.	"Can Can Summer"	Smith, Spurr, Polou, Keiron Melling, Peter Greenway	3:08
8.	"Tommy Shooter"	Smith	3:45
9.	"Latch Key Kid"	Smith, Spurr, Poulou	3:20
10.	"Is This New"	Smith, Andi Toma	2:14
11.	"Senior Twilight Stock Replacer"	Smith, Spurr	3:08
12.	"Exploding Chimney"	Smith, Spurr, Melling, Poulou, Greenway	2:25
Total length:			47:21

- "Strangetown" includes elements of "Garden", also written by McPhee and originally performed by the Groundhogs.

=== 2020 expanded edition ===
Disc 1 - original album

- as per original edition

Disc 2 - Britannia Row recordings 21/9/07

- Unused recordings made at Britannia Row Studios in London.

No.	Title	Writer(s)	Length
1.	"Wolf Kidult Man"	Smith, Spurr, Poulou	2:39
2.	"I've Been Duped"	Smith (Note: Credited to Smith and Spurr on the 2020 expanded edition.)	2:28
3.	"Ponto"	The Fall	3:08
4.	"Tommy Shooter"	Smith	3:41
5.	"Taurig"	Poulou	3:01
6.	"Can Can Summer"	Smith, Spurr, Polou, Melling, Greenway	2:32
7.	"Strangetown"	McPhee	2:45
8.	"Alton Towers"	Smith, Spurr	3:02
9.	"50 Year Old Man"	Smith, Spurr	6:02
10.	"Senior Twilight Stock Replacer"	Smith, Spurr	3:06
11.	"Smith and Mark"	The Fall	2:40
12.	"Inferior Product Man"	The Fall	3:07
13.	"Is This New"	Smith, Toma	2:13
Total length:			40:47

Disc 3 - De La Warr Pavilion, Bexhill on Sea, East Sussex 10/5/08

- An entire live set recorded at De La Warr Pavilion, Bexhill on Sea, East Sussex.

No.	Title	Writer(s)	Length
1.	"Is This New"	Smith, Toma	4:02
2.	"Wings"	Smith, Steve Hanley, Paul Hanley	3:58
3.	"Wolf Kidult Man"	Smith, Spurr, Poulou	2:52
4.	"Fall Sound"	Smith, Robert Barbato, Tim Presley, Orpheo McCord	3:31
5.	"50 Year Old Man"	Smith, Spurr	7:08
6.	"I've Been Duped"	Smith (Note: Credited to Smith and Spurr on the 2020 expanded edition.)	3:54
7.	"Mountain Enegei"	Smith, Dave Milner	5:01
8.	"White Lightning"	J.P. Richardson	2:01
9.	"Can Can Summer"	Smith, Spurr, Polou, Melling, Greenway	4:41
10.	"Latch Key Kid"	Smith, Spurr, Polou	3:03
11.	"Mr Pharmacist"	Jeff Nowlen	2:12
12.	"Tommy Shooter"	Smith	5:25
13.	"Pacifying Joint"	Smith	3:05
14.	"Blindness"	Smith, Spencer Birtwistle	9:26
15.	"Over! Over!"	Smith	4:39
Total length:			65:06

== Personnel ==
The Fall

- Mark E. Smith – vocals, production
- Eleni Poulou – keyboards, vocals, lead vocals on "I've Been Duped"
- Peter Greenway – guitar
- David Spurr – bass guitar
- Keiron Melling – drums

Technical

- Grant Showbiz – production
- Andi Toma – production
- Tim Baxter – production
- Tom Pritchard – engineering
- Simon 'Dingo' Archer – engineering
- Olliver Groscheck – engineering
- Anthony Frost – cover art
