= Up from Below =

Studio album by Edward Sharpe and the Magnetic Zeros
- Released: July 7, 2009
- Recorded: June 2008 – June 2009
- Studio: Woodrow Hideaway, Laurel Canyon
- Genre: Indie folk; folk rock; neo-psychedelia
- Length: 56:58
- Label: Vagrant; Rough Trade
- Producer: Nicolo Aglietti; Aaron Older; Edward Sharpe

Edward Sharpe and the Magnetic Zeros chronology
Here Comes (2009)	Up from Below (2009)	Here (2012)

Professional ratings
Aggregate scores
Source	Rating
Metacritic	66/100
Review scores
Source	Rating
AllMusic	3/5 stars
Drowned in Sound	7/10
The Guardian	3/5 stars
Pitchfork	4.1/10
Prefix Mag	8.5/10
Sputnikmusic	2.5/5
Uncut	4/5 stars

Up from Below is the first album from Edward Sharpe and the Magnetic Zeros. It was preceded by Here Comes EP.

== Commercial performance ==
As of July 4, 2013, the album has sold 363,000 copies in United States.

== Track listing ==
All tracks are written by Alex Ebert (credited as the fictitious "Edward Sharpe"), except where noted.

Up from Below track listing
No.	Title	Length
1.	"40 Day Dream"	3:54
2.	"Janglin"	3:50
3.	"Up from Below" (Nico Aglietti, Tay Strathairn, Ebert)	4:10
4.	"Carries On"	4:31
5.	"Jade!" (Christian Letts, Ebert)	3:44
6.	"Home" (Jade Castrinos, Ebert)	5:06
7.	"Desert Song"	4:30
8.	"Black Water"	3:51
9.	"Come in Please" (Aglietti, Ebert)	5:07
10.	"Simplest Love"	2:53
11.	"Kisses over Babylon"	5:16
12.	"Brother" (Aglietti, Ebert)	3:57
13.	"Om Nashi Me"	6:16
14.	"Carries On" (KCRW.com presents) (US digital-only bonus track)	4:26
15.	"Desert Song" (US digital-only bonus video)	6:54

== Charts ==
Chart performance for Up from Below
Chart (2009)	Peak position
Australian Albums Chart	86
Canadian Albums Chart	132
US Billboard 200	76

Chart (2013)	Peak position
UK Albums (2013)	52

== Certifications ==
Certifications for Up from Below
Region	Certification	Certified units/sales
New Zealand (RMNZ)	Gold	7,500^{‡}
United States (RIAA)	Gold	500,000^{‡}
^{‡} Sales+streaming figures based on certification alone.
