= Odessa (musician) =

American singer songwriter

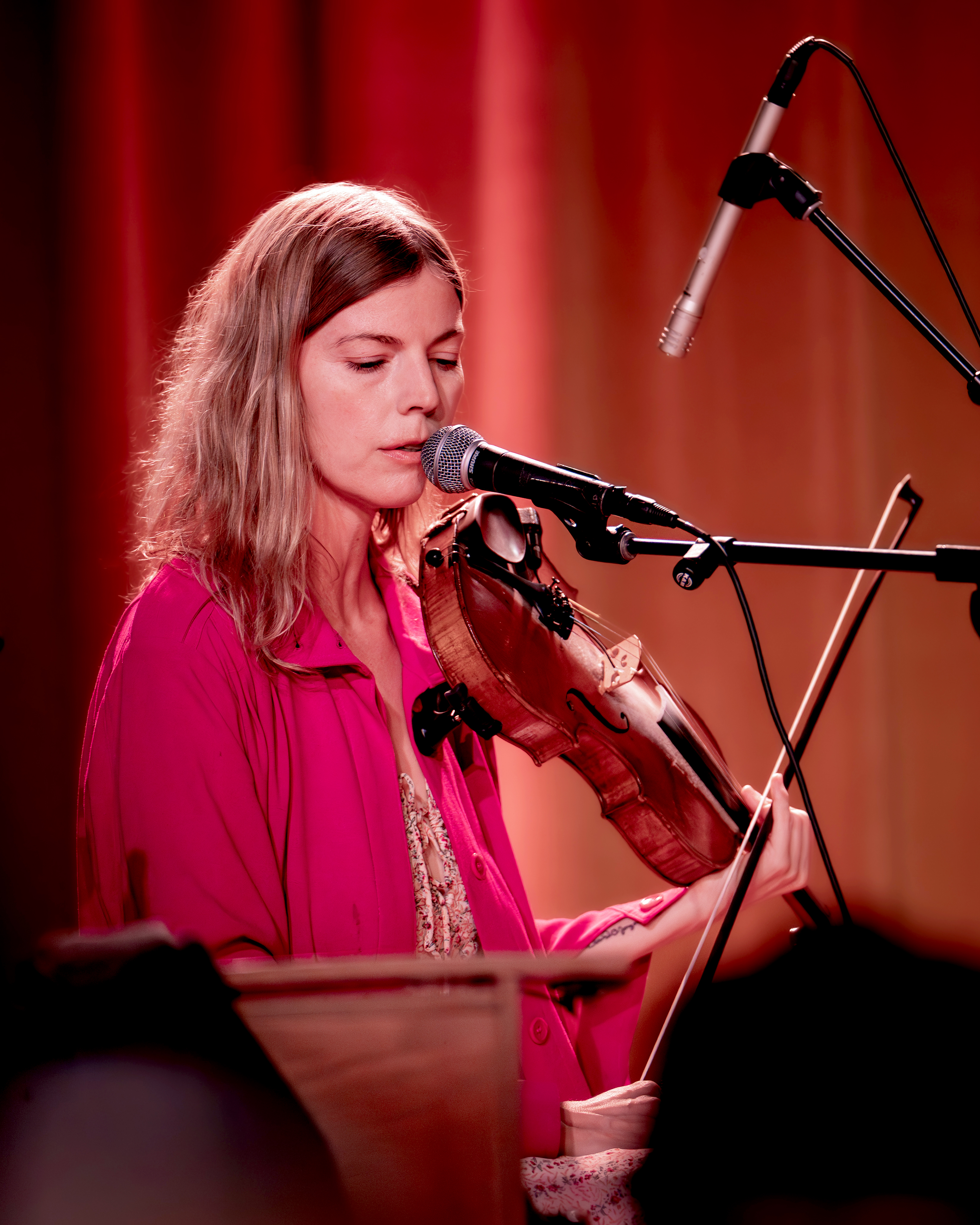
Odessa performing in 2026

Odessa Rose Jorgensen, known mononymously as Odessa, is an American singer, songwriter, and guitarist from California.

Jorgensen learned violin from age four, and her father played in surf rock groups in the 1960s. Though born in California, she lived for many years in Nashville. As a teenager, she performed as a violinist at Carnegie Hall and modeled for Versace. She played violin and sang vocals in the bluegrass group Bearfoot in the late 2000s. After leaving Bearfoot, she played violin with Old Crow Medicine Show, Abigail Washburn, and Edward Sharpe and the Magnetic Zeroes. While working with Edward Sharpe and the Magnetic Zeroes, she was hit by a car while riding her bike in Nashville, which resulted in a skull fracture, a spine injury, and the loss of several teeth. She continued touring as a violinist, even though she could not sing during this time, and worked on tracks for an anticipated self-titled album.

In 2014, Jorgensen signed with Chop Shop/Republic, and released an EP produced by Jacquire King in September of that year; she then released a solo album digitally in 2015. The single "I Will Be There" was licensed for use in a Subaru commercial. In 2019, she issued a sophomore digital album, All Things, released on the independent Public Hi-Fi Records and composed of songs written primarily while on a retreat at Eagle Rock, Los Angeles.

Jorgensen collaborated with Maya Hawke on the latter artist's 2026 album Maitreya Corso, and was Maya's violinist during the related An Evening With Maya Hawke / The Maitreya Corso Tour series of concerts.

== Discography ==
- Odessa EP (Chop Shop/Republic, 2014)
- Odessa LP (Chop Shop/Republic, 2015)
- All Things (Public Hi-Fi, 2019)
