= Johannes Girardoni =

Austrian-American sculptor and installation artist

- Born: Graz, Austria
- Education: Bowdoin College
- Known for: Sculpture and Installation

Johannes Girardoni (born 1967) is an Austrian-American sculptor and installation artist who uses digital and analog technology. His work ranges from small, organic objects to large-scale interactive light installations.

== Early life ==
Girardoni grew up in a village just outside Vienna and migrated with his family to California in 1982 at the age of fourteen. Between 1985 and 1989 he earned a BA majoring in both History and Art at Bowdoin College in the Maine. During his training at Bowdoin, Girardoni was also a guest artist at the MIT Media Lab.

== Work ==
=== Exhibitions ===
Light Reactive Organic Sculpture

Girardoni began working in two dimensions, eventually moving into the third dimension. His works are an inspiration from hot wax painting previously practiced by Brice Marden and Jasper Johns. He uses a system of formal oppositions.

His inaugural exhibition was held in New York in 1991 after his work was noticed by art curator Friedhelm Mennekes, In 2005, he participated in the Personal Structures at Ludwig Museum, Germany. He also exhibited at the Origins exhibition sponsored by the Hudson Valley Center for Contemporary Art in Peekskill, New York.

Refrequenced sculpture

In 2009, Girardoni presented 7 Minutes 20 Seconds, an installation at the Austrian Cultural Forum’ New York exhibition Creative Migration. In 2011, he participated at the 54th Venice Biennale featuring The (Dis)appearance of Everything, an interactive multi-media installation that converts light to sound. The 2013 exhibition titled Off and On at Nye & Brown in Los Angeles, CA, Girardoni featured two interactive installations that transformed light and sound through sensors and Spectro-Sonic refrequencing sound devices that coordinated by an algorithm that converted light waves into sound waves, thereby making light audible.

Girardoni’s 2018 survey exhibition at Levy Gorvy London, titled Sensing Singularity features his work called Metaspace V3, a software-driven installation that evolved with the participants movements. Inside the pod, visitors experienced a borderless space filled with colour, that cycled through the spectrum at different speeds, converting light into ambient sound through sensors in the ceiling; outside the pod a pixelated surveillance video projected the synced colour changes onto the gallery wall.

=== Other notable work ===
The Infinite Room is a large-scale, site specific sculpture in Washington State. Spectral Bridge is an in-situ sculpture integral to the architecture of Spectral Bridge House in Venice, CA. A book on his work entitled Johannes Girardoni was released in 2007 while his work has also been feature in the 2005 book Personal Structures.

In 2011, he exhibited his minimal work and photographs of billboards, overlaid with obscuring shapes, at the PDX Contemporary Art in Portland, Oregon. In his exhibits, he used a tension between concave and convex angles to create optical illusions, as well as other directional tips to trigger the peripheral vision of the viewer. He has also exhibited at the Tomlinson Kong Contemporary in New York City.

=== Collections ===
Collections that include pieces by Girardoni are in Fogg Museum at Harvard University, the Museum Ludwig in Cologne, Germany, and the Progressive Art Collection in Cleveland, Ohio.

== Awards ==
In 2019, he received the Francis J. Greenburger Award for artists whom the art world knows to be of extraordinary merit but who have not been fully recognized by the public.

== Reception ==
According to Klara Stima of Art Magazine, "his early impressions were influenced by the Hungarian landscape". In a 2011 interview, Professor of Art A. LeRoy Greason at Bowdoin spoke of the arc of Girardoni's career that, "it has grown from sculptural wall objects ... to multi-media installations that incorporate sound and light, painting over large-format photos." In 2004, Tracey Hummer of Art in America magazine noted that Girardoni's work has created of "straightforward contrast of materials: the fabricated and the found". In 2006 Lodermeyer described Girardoni's work as "virtually the opposite of minimalism". Grace Glueck of the New York Times described a 2003 exhibition of his as "Minimalist slabs of smooth wax in rich monochromes, contrastingly placed in settings of no-color weathered wood or raw metal". The billboard side of the exhibit was described by Lisa Radon of Art Ltd Magazine as images "layered with digitally created double exposures ... overlaid with screened-back blocks of color and painted forms that echo those of the billboard's outlines, transforming oddball roadside photos into architectural studies in form."
