= Ice melting =

Ice melting may refer to:

- Ice melt
- Retreat of glaciers since 1850
- Arctic sea ice decline
