= Here (Edward Sharpe album) =

Studio album by Edward Sharpe and the Magnetic Zeros
- Released: May 29, 2012
- Genres: Indie folk; gospel; folk rock; neo-psychedelia
- Length: 37:58
- Labels: Vagrant; Rough Trade
- Producer: Alex Ebert

Edward Sharpe and the Magnetic Zeros chronology
Up from Below (2009)	Here (2012)	Edward Sharpe and the Magnetic Zeros (2013)

Professional ratings
Aggregate scores
Source	Rating
Metacritic	62/100
Review scores
Source	Rating
Consequence of Sound	3/5 stars
Paste	4.9/10
Pitchfork	6.0/10
Under the Gun Review	5/10

Here is the second album from Edward Sharpe and the Magnetic Zeros. It was preceded by Up from Below. Recorded at Adios Studios, a.k.a. the Ed Shed in Ojai, California and at Studio in the Country in Louisiana, it was released on May 29, 2012, by Vagrant Records and Rough Trade Records. It received mostly positive reviews, ranking number 7 on Rolling Stone's Best Albums of 2012 list, saying "Frontman Alex Ebert sings earnestly about love and spirituality, letting his mind wander pleasantly over the band's homespun harmonies and easy-going folk-psych instrumentation."

== Track listing ==
All tracks are written by Alex Ebert.

No.	Title	Length
1.	"Man on Fire"	4:19
2.	"That's What's Up"	3:52
3.	"I Don't Wanna Pray"	3:26
4.	"Mayla"	5:42
5.	"Dear Believer"	4:46
6.	"Child"	3:09
7.	"One Love to Another"	3:32
8.	"Fiya Wata"	4:12
9.	"All Wash Out"	4:40

== Personnel ==
- Alex Ebert – vocals, guitars, percussion, organ, string arrangements
- Jade Castrinos – vocals
- Stewart Cole – piano, organ, synths, wurlitzer, pump organ, trumpet, alto horn, baritone horn, trombone, omnichord, vocals
- Josh Collazo – drums, vocals
- Seth Ford-Young – electric and acoustic bass, electric guitar, vocals
- Nora Kirkpatrick – accordion, organ, synth, vocals
- Christian Letts – acoustic guitar, electric guitar, vocals
- Orpheo McCord – drums, percussion, marimba, drum machines, didgeridoo, vocals

With:

- Mark Noseworthy – electric guitar, acoustic guitar, 11 string guitar, charango, ronrocco, banjo, vocals
- Aaron Arntz – piano, clavinet
- Aaron Embry – piano, harmonica
- Nico Algietti – guitars
- Aaron Older – bass
- Nathaniel Markman – fiddle, viola
- George Castrinos – slide guitar on "Fiya Wata"
- Matt Linesch – engineer/mixing engineer

== Commercial performance ==
Here debuted at No. 5 on the Billboard 200, with 35,000 copies sold in its first week. Up from Below, their debut album, peaked at No. 76. As of July 4, 2013 the album has sold 119,000 copies in United States.

== Charts ==
Chart (2012)	Peak position
Australian Albums (ARIA)	37
Canadian Albums (Billboard)	9
French Albums (SNEP)	97
UK Albums (OCC)	170
US Billboard 200	5
US Americana/Folk Albums (Billboard)	1
US Top Alternative Albums (Billboard)	2
US Independent Albums (Billboard)	1
US Top Rock Albums (Billboard)	3
US Indie Store Album Sales (Billboard)	2
