= He's My Brother She's My Sister =

American multi-genre folk band

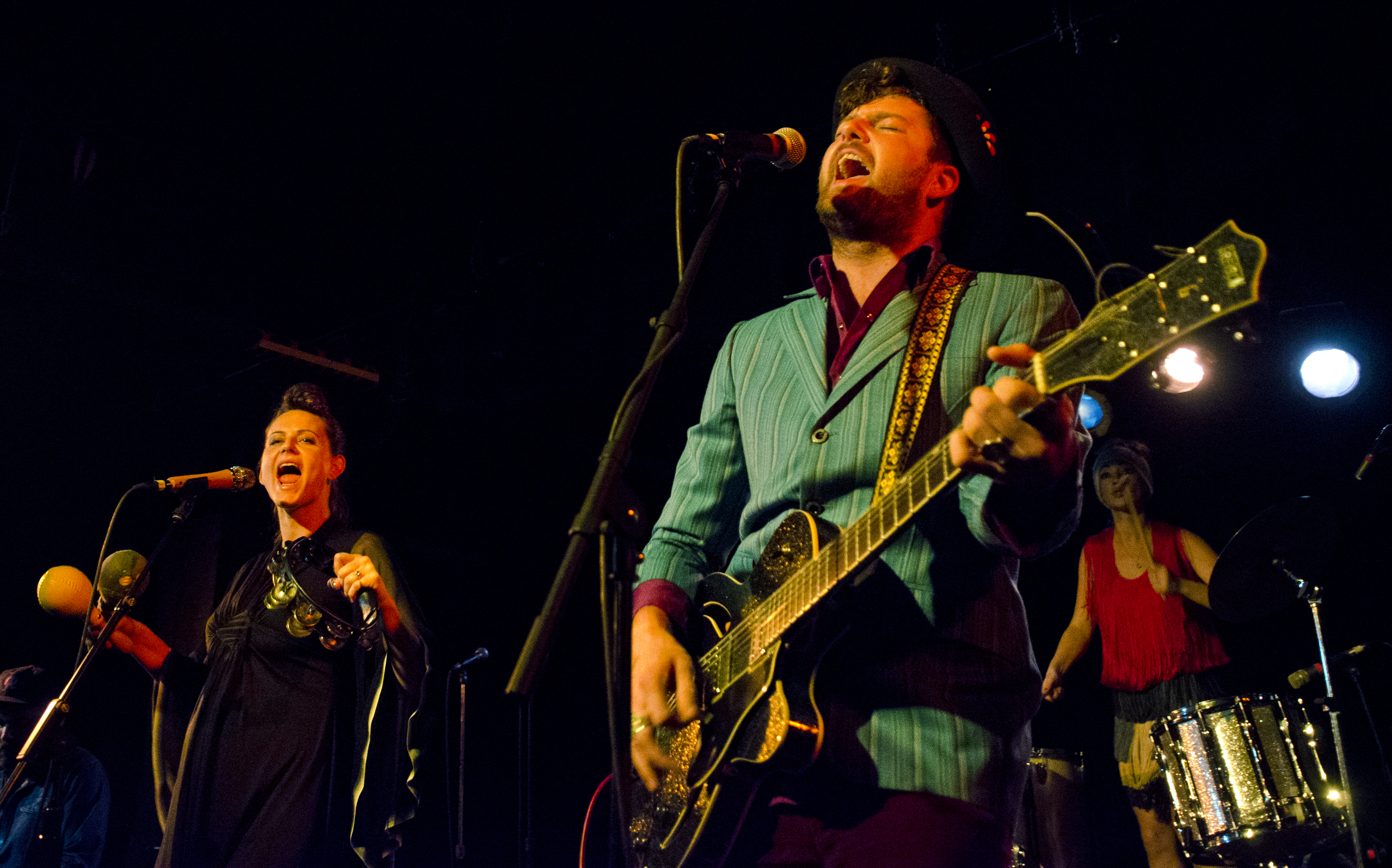
- From left to right: Rachel Kolar, Rob Kolar, and Lauren Brown in 2013 at Black Cat in DC

Background information
- Origin: Los Angeles, California
- Genres: Folk, glam folk, garage country, cabaret blues, desert pop, cirque rock, melange
- Label: Park The Van
- Members: Rachel Kolar; Rob Kolar; Lauren Brown; Oliver 'Oliwa' Newell; Ryan Richter
- Website: hesmybrothershesmysister.com

He's My Brother She's My Sister is a band formed in Los Angeles, California. This folk group has been influenced by a wide range of genres ranging from pop, country, and punk among others.

== History ==
Formed by brother-sister duo Robert and Rachel Kolar, the group would grow to five members. The band features a tap dancing drummer, Lauren Brown, known for inventing her own unique style of full body percussion.

They have played over 150 shows. Their first full-length album, Nobody Dances in This Town, was released on October 9, 2012.

Band member Rob Kolar scored the television series The Detour on TBS, which also features the music of He's My Brother She's My Sister. The Detour made its television debut on April 11, 2016.

== Band members ==
- Rachel Kolar (Vocals & Percussion)
- Rob Kolar (Vocals & Guitar)
- Lauren Brown (Tap Dancing Drummer)
- Oliver "Oliwa" Newell (Upright Bass)
- Ryan Richter (Slide Guitar)

== Discography ==
=== Studio albums ===
- 2012: Nobody Dances in This Town

=== EPs ===
- 2010: He's My Brother She's My Sister

=== Singles ===
- 2012: "What Goes On"
- 2012: "How'm I Gonna Get Back Home (Live)"
- 2012: "Straight Shooter"
- 2011: "Escape Tonight"
- 2010: "Merry Christmas Everybody"

== See also ==
- KOLARS
