= PersonA =

Studio album by Edward Sharpe and the Magnetic Zeros
- Released: April 15, 2016
- Genre: Rock
- Length: 45:10
- Label: Community Music
- Producer: Alex Ebert, Nicolo Aglietti

Edward Sharpe and the Magnetic Zeros chronology
Edward Sharpe and the Magnetic Zeros (2013)	PersonA (2016)

Singles from PersonA
- 1. "Hot Coals" Released: 13 November 2015; 2. "No Love Like Yours" Released: 29 January 2016; 3. "Wake Up the Sun" Released: 24 June 2016; 4. "Perfect Time" Released: 9 September 2016

PersonA (pronounced "Persona") is the fourth and final studio album by the band Edward Sharpe and the Magnetic Zeros. It was released on April 15, 2016.

In an in-depth interview with Transverso Media, lead singer Alex Ebert explained his desire to evolve on PersonA, stating, "In a lot of ways this album does things that are missing." He went on to discuss why the name Edward Sharpe is crossed out on the cover, saying, "There was no character to begin with, so why not kill him? He never really was there. If anything, and at most, Edward Sharpe was a vehicle for me to get to slough off whatever I had become up until that point, and to get back to or sort of allow my pure self to come forth into sort of a clean slate."

== Track listing ==
All lyrics written by Alexander Ebert; all music written by Edward Sharpe and the Magnetic Zeros, except where noted.

No.	Title	Writer(s)	Length
1.	"Hot Coals"		7:17
2.	"Uncomfortable"	Alexander Ebert	3:46
3.	"Somewhere"	Alexander Ebert	3:18
4.	"No Love Like Yours"	Alexander Ebert	2:57
5.	"Wake Up the Sun"		6:41
6.	"Free Stuff"	Alexander Ebert	3:05
7.	"Let It Down"		4:33
8.	"Perfect Time"		4:41
9.	"Lullaby"	Alexander Ebert, Mitchell Yoshida	3:55
10.	"The Ballad of Yaya"		4:57
Total length:			45:10

== Personnel ==
- Alexander Ebert — lead vocals, piano; Chroma Polaris synthesizer on "Uncomfortable", acoustic guitar on "No Love Like Yours"
- Crash — backing vocals, percussion
- Nicolo Aglietti — electric and acoustic guitars; sound effects, Korg MS-10 synthesizer and bass on "No Love Like Yours"
- Mark Noseworthy — 6-string and 12-string electric and acoustic guitars, backing vocals, baritone guitar
- Christian Letts — electric and acoustic guitars, backing vocals
- Stewart Cole — Hammond B3, Lowrey and pump organs, backing vocals, Prophet 5 synthesizer, trumpet, baritone saxophone
- Mitchell Yoshida — piano, backing vocals, Korg MS-10 synthesizer, baritone saxophone, percussion
- Seth Ford-Young — bass, backing vocals, double bass
- Josh Collazo — drums, backing vocals
- Orpheo McCord — percussion, backing vocals, drums, marimba, timpani
- Justin Meldal-Johnsen — bass in "Somewhere" and "No Love Like Yours"
- Patrick Warren — string arrangements on "Perfect Time"

== Charts ==
Chart (2016)	Peak position
Canadian Albums (Billboard)	57
US Billboard 200	130
US Top Alternative Albums (Billboard)	10
US Americana/Folk Albums (Billboard)	6
US Independent Albums (Billboard)	12
US Top Rock Albums (Billboard)	15
