= Running Scared =

Running Scared may refer to:

== In film ==
- Running Scared (1972 film), a drama film starring Robert Powell
- Running Scared (1980 film), an action film starring Ken Wahl and Judge Reinhold
- Running Scared (1986 film), an action/comedy buddy cop film starring Gregory Hines and Billy Crystal
- Running Scared (2006 film), an action/thriller film starring Paul Walker

== In literature and publications ==
- Running Scared, a 1964 novel by Gregory Mcdonald
- Running Scared, a 1998 novel by Ann Granger

== In music ==
- "Running Scared" (Eurovision 2011 winning song)
- "Running Scared" (Roy Orbison song)
- "Running Scared", a song by Nik Kershaw from Radio Musicola
- "Sweet Freedom" (Michael McDonald song) (AKA, "'Running Scared' theme" from the 1986 film)

== In television ==
- Running Scared (TV series), a British children's drama series
