= Jen Tullock =

American actress (born 1983)

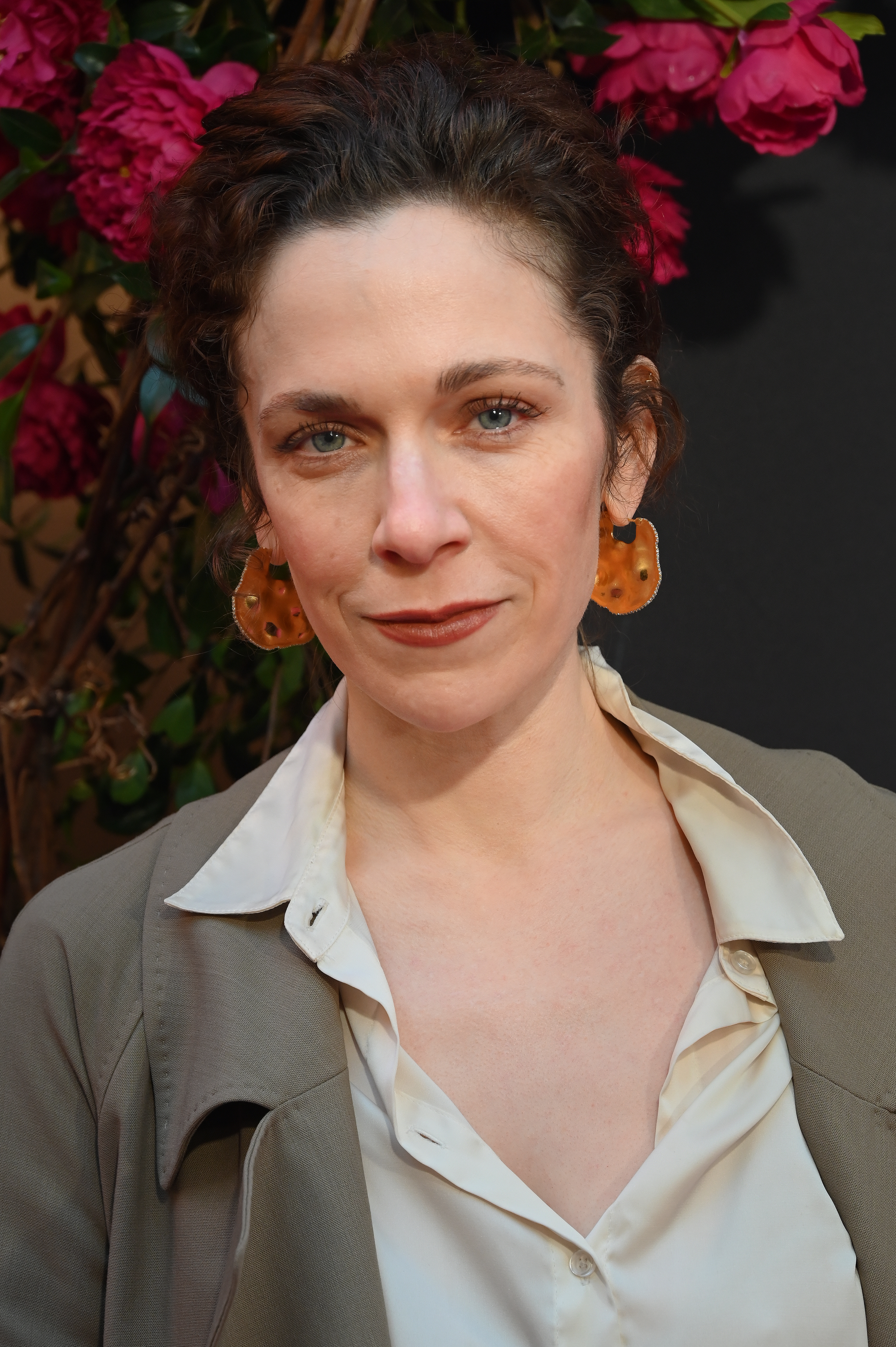
- Tullock in 2025
- Born: Jennifer Leigh Tullock; July 4, 1983 (age 43); Louisville, Kentucky, U.S.
- Education: Millikin University (BFA)
- Occupations: Actor; writer
- Years active: 2007–present
- Spouse: Marie Ronn (m. 2024)

Jennifer Leigh Tullock (born July 4, 1983) is an American actress and writer best known for her roles as Devon Scout-Hale in Apple TV+'s Severance and Anita St. Pierre in HBO's Perry Mason.

== Early life and education ==
Tullock was born on July 4, 1983, and is from Louisville, Kentucky. Her younger brother, Ryan, is a touring bassist for the indie pop band Tennis. She grew up in Jeffersontown and Crescent Hill. She attended the Christian Academy of Louisville until her final year of school, when she attended Eastern High School. After graduating from high school, she studied at Millikin University and graduated in 2006 with a Bachelor of Fine Arts in acting.

== Career ==
Tullock moved to Brooklyn in 2007, where she worked as a theatre actor and writer. She also practiced improv, performed one-person shows, did voice-over work, and acted in commercials. She performed in plays in Chicago and New York City, including the world premiere of Frank Winters' On the Head of a Pin at 59E59 Theatres.

The principal cast of Severance, including Tullock, was nominated for a 2022 Screen Actors Guild Award for Outstanding Performance by an Ensemble in a Drama Series. For her role as Anita in season two of HBO's Perry Mason, she was nominated for an Astra TV Award for Best Supporting Actress in a Broadcast Network or Cable Drama Series.

In 2019, Tullock co-wrote and co-starred (with Hannah Pearl Utt) in the drama film Before You Know It, which premiered in the U.S. Dramatic Competition at the 2019 Sundance Film Festival. Previously, her short film with Utt, Partners, premiered at the 2016 Sundance Film Festival and their feature film was a participant in the 2017 Sundance Screenwriters' Lab. Their series Disengaged was produced for the streaming platform Super Deluxe.

In 2020, Tullock created Eggshell, a mockumentary project consisting of fictional social media videos satirizing suburban white women. A work of hers was performed at the New York Stage and Film Powerhouse Theater Training Program in 2010. She wrote for HuffPost's Queer Voices, and was in the writers' room for Funny or Die series The Coop, in which she also starred.

She was the writer and co-host of the Heritage Radio Network's show The Morning After. In 2024, she premiered her solo show You Shall Inherit the Earth!, about her experience and thoughts while suffering a stroke; the show was directed by Josh Ruben. She is a Sundance Feature Film Program committee mentor and former Sundance screenwriting fellow.

In October 2025, Tullock premiered her off-Broadway solo show Nothing Can Take You from the Hand of God at Playwrights Horizons. Co-written with Frank Winters and directed by Jared Mezzocchi, the show incorporates multimedia elements to tell the semi-autobiographical story of a lesbian writer returning to her home town in Kentucky to confront her family and members of their evangelical church.

== Personal life ==
Tullock is a lesbian. In 2022, Tullock matched with Marie Ronn on the dating app Hinge but they later lost touch after planning a first date. A few months later in November 2022, they ran into each other at the Spirited premiere and began dating thereafter. They became engaged in March 2023 and married on May 11, 2024, at Ludlow House in New York.

== Filmography ==
=== Film ===
Year	Title	Role	Notes
2013	King Theodore Live	Gof	Short film
2014	Jammed	Camera Snob / Hippie	
2015	Partners	Leigh	Short film; also writer and producer
2015	Henry	Henry	Short film
2015	Fils	Gigi	Short film; also writer and producer
2015	Base	Karen	Short film
2016	When the Wrong Words Come Out	Marie	Short film; also director and writer
2016	Eat Prey	Marina	Short film
2017	Hoof	Eva Ward	Short film; also producer
2018	6 Balloons	Bianca	
2018	Red Light	Ruth	Short film
2019	Before You Know It	Jackie Gurner	Also writer
2019	Long Time Listener, First Time Caller	Debbie	Short film
2022	Spirited	Wendy	
2022	Love, Me	Trish	Short film; also producer
2023	Cora Bora	Herself	
2025	A Tree Fell in the Woods	Miranda	Voice role

=== Television ===
Year	Title	Role	Notes
2015	Lofty Dreams	Chlois	2 episodes
2015–2016	Disengaged	Sidney	Main role; also writer and executive producer
2016	Casual	Diane	Episode: "Trivial Pursuit"
2016	Roadies	Logan the Eraser Girl	Episode: "The Corporate Gig"
2017	Virtually Mike and Nora	Sue	Episode: "Suicidal Deer"
2017	Budding Prospects	Martha	Television film
2017	Curb Your Enthusiasm	Brunch Patron #3	Episode: "Never Wait for Seconds!"
2017	SMILF	Morgan	Episode: "Family-Sized Popcorn & a Can of Wine"
2018	Door No. 1	Margo	Episode: "Ten Year"
2019	Bless This Mess	Monique	Episode: "Pilot"
2019	Best Seller	Cindy Silver	Episode: "Pilot"
2019	The Coop	Iwona	Main role; also writer
2022–present	Severance	Devon Scout-Hale	Main role
2023	The L Word: Generation Q	Kimmy	Episode: "Looking Ahead"
2023	Perry Mason	Anita St. Pierre	7 episodes
TBA	The Best of Us		

== Awards and nominations ==
Year	Award	Category	Work	Result	Ref.
2016	New York City Independent Film Festival	Best Actress	Partners	Won	
2023	Screen Actors Guild Awards	Outstanding Performance by an Ensemble in a Drama Series	Severance	Nominated	
2024	Astra Awards	Best Supporting Actress in a Broadcast Network or Cable Series, Drama	Perry Mason	Nominated	
2026	Actor Awards	Outstanding Performance by an Ensemble in a Drama Series	Severance	Nominated	
