= Hannah Pearl Utt =

American filmmaker (born 1987)

- Born: February 22, 1987 (age 39)
- Occupations: Film director, screenwriter, actress

Hannah Pearl Utt (born February 22, 1987) is an American filmmaker and actress best known for the 2019 film Before You Know It and the 2023 film Cora Bora.

== Early life and education ==
Utt was raised in Santa Barbara, California. After initially enrolling at the University of California, Los Angeles, she graduated with a bachelor's degree from the Gallatin School of Individualized Study at New York University.

== Career ==
While at UCLA in the late 2000s, Utt appeared alongside her fellow students in the web series Dorm Life.

From 2015 to 2016, Utt directed and starred in the series Disengaged for Super Deluxe. She co-wrote the series with her fellow series star Jen Tullock, with whom she previously collaborated on the short film Partners. Utt appeared in a small role in the 2017 film Ingrid Goes West.

Before You Know It, Utt's feature directorial debut, premiered at the 2019 Sundance Film Festival. Utt had written the screenplay for the project with Tullock and the two starred in the feature alongside Judith Light, Oona Yaffe, and Mandy Patinkin. That year, she was named as one of "25 Female Filmmakers to Watch" by IndieWire.

In 2023, Utt's second feature film Cora Bora starring Meg Stalter premiered at the South by Southwest Film Festival.

== Personal life ==
Utt resides in Los Angeles.

== Filmography ==
=== Film ===
Year	Title	Director	Writer	Actor	Role	Notes	Ref.
2015	Partners	No	Yes	Yes	Kate	Short film	
2017	Ingrid Goes West	No	No	Yes	Nicole	Credited as Hannah Utt	
2019	Before You Know It	Yes	Yes	Yes	Rachel Gurner	—N/a	
2023	Cora Bora	Yes	No	No	—N/a	—N/a	
2024	Omni Loop	No	No	Yes	Jayne	—N/a	

=== Web series ===
Year	Title	Director	Writer	Actor	Role	Notes	Ref.
2008–2009	Dorm Life	No	No	Yes	Brittany Wilcox	41 episodes	
2015–2016	Disengaged	Yes	Yes	Yes	Jules	Directed 8 of 10 episodes	

== Awards and nominations ==
Year	Award	Category	Nominated work	Result	Ref.
2009	Streamy Awards	Best Ensemble Cast in a Web Series	Dorm Life	Nominated (Note: Nominated alongside Nora Kirkpatrick, Anne Lane, Jessie Gaskell, Brian Singleton, Jack De Sena, Chris Smith, Jim Brandon, Jordan Riggs, and Pancho Morris.)	
2010	Streamy Awards	Best Ensemble Cast in a Web Series	Dorm Life	Nominated	
2019	Sundance Film Festival	U.S. Dramatic Competition	Before You Know It	Nominated	
2019	Cleveland International Film Festival	American Independents Competition	Before You Know It	Nominated	
2019	Cleveland International Film Festival	Reel Women Direct Award for Excellence in Directing by a Woman	Before You Know It	Nominated	
2020	Queerty	Best Film Performance	Before You Know It	Nominated	
2023	Nashville Film Festival	Best Narrative Feature	Cora Bora	Nominated	
