= Fletch (film) =

1985 American neo-noir comedy thriller film by Michael Ritchie

- Theatrical release poster
- Directed by: Michael Ritchie
- Screenplay by: Andrew Bergman
- Based on: Fletch by Gregory Mcdonald
- Produced by: Peter Douglas; Alan Greisman
- Starring: Chevy Chase; Joe Don Baker; Dana Wheeler-Nicholson; Richard Libertini; Tim Matheson
- Cinematography: Fred Schuler
- Edited by: Richard A. Harris
- Music by: Harold Faltermeyer
- Distributed by: Universal Pictures
- Release date: May 31, 1985
- Running time: 98 minutes
- Country: United States
- Language: English
- Budget: $8 million
- Box office: $59 million

Fletch is a 1985 American comedy thriller film directed by Michael Ritchie and written by Andrew Bergman. Based on Gregory Mcdonald's popular Fletch novels, the film stars Chevy Chase as the title character. It co-stars Tim Matheson, Dana Wheeler-Nicholson, Geena Davis and Joe Don Baker.

The film revolves around Los Angeles Times reporter Irwin M. "Fletch" Fletcher, who is offered a large sum of money by millionaire Alan Stanwyk to kill him; Stanwyk claims to have a terminal cancer prognosis and that suicide would invalidate his life insurance policy. Fletch becomes suspicious when he discovers the man is not ill; when he continues to investigate, his life is threatened.

Fletch did well with critics and at the box office—it was among the top 50 grossing domestic films in its first year of release. It was followed by a 1989 sequel, Fletch Lives, also starring Chase. Subsequent decades saw many unsuccessful attempts to restart or reboot the series, until Confess, Fletch, starring Jon Hamm, was released in 2022.

== Plot ==
Los Angeles Times undercover reporter Irwin M. "Fletch" Fletcher (who writes as "Jane Doe") is writing an article exposing drug trafficking on the beaches of Los Angeles. While posing as an addict, he is approached by Boyd Aviation executive vice president Alan Stanwyk, who assumes Fletch is a real junkie. Stanwyk claims to have bone cancer with only months left to live, and wishes to avoid the suffering. Claiming suicide would nullify his expensive life insurance policy but murder wouldn't, Stanwyk offers $50,000 for Fletch to kill him at his mansion in a few days' time, stage the scene as a burglary, then flee to Rio de Janeiro.

Fletch, not completely convinced of the truth of Stanwyk's story, agrees to the plan. Along with his colleague Larry, he begins investigating Stanwyk instead of completing his drug exposé, much to the chagrin of his editor Frank Walker. Disguised as a doctor, Fletch goes to the hospital where he accesses Stanwyk's medical records and learns he does not have cancer.

Fletch visits Stanwyk's wife Gail at her tennis club. Pretending to be Stanwyk's friend, he flirts with her. Looking into Stanwyk's finances, Fletch finds that Gail recently converted $3 million of her personal stock in Boyd Aviation into cash for her husband, to buy a ranch in Provo, Utah. Fletch travels to Provo and breaks into the realtor's office and discovers the sale price was only $3,000.

Meanwhile, Police Chief Jerry Karlin learns of Fletch's drug report. He warns Fletch that the article will jeopardize his supposed undercover operation on the beach. Karlin threatens to kill Fletch unless he agrees to drop the investigation.

At the tennis club, Fletch witnesses arrogant club member Ted Underhill shouting at a waiter, and decides as revenge to use Underhill's tab to treat Gail to an expensive lunch in her private cabana. Fletch reveals Stanwyk's murder scheme to her and tells her the true price of the ranch. He convinces her to let him continue his investigation.

Fletch watches Stanwyk making a suspicious briefcase exchange with Chief Karlin, but is unable to deduce the nature of their meeting. When he is chased by several police officers lying in wait at his apartment, Fletch goes into hiding, returning to Provo. Posing as an insurance investigator, he interviews Stanwyk's parents Marvin and Velma, learning that Stanwyk has been married to another woman named Sally Anne for eight years; his bigamous marriage to Gail allowed him access to her vast wealth.

Fletch arrives at Stanwyk's mansion on the night of the planned murder, but finds Stanwyk waiting to kill him instead. Fletch reveals he is a reporter, and that he has already deduced Stanwyk's real plan to fake his own death by killing Fletch (who has a similar physical build to Stanwyk's) and burning his body beyond recognition, then escaping to Brazil with Sally Anne, taking Gail's $3 million. Stanwyk was also using his private jet to smuggle drugs from South America to supply Chief Karlin, who blackmailed ex-convicts Fat Sam and Gummy to distribute it on the beaches. Karlin arrives unexpectedly; learning of Stanwyk's intention to flee with nearly $1 million of the Chief's drug money, Karlin shoots and kills Stanwyk. Karlin and Fletch then fight over the gun until Gail strikes Karlin from behind with a tennis racket, rendering him unconscious.

Karlin is indicted after the publication of Fletch's article, with testimony from Fat Sam and Gummy. Fletch begins dating Gail, taking her to Rio on Stanwyk's tickets and using Underhill's American Express Card.

== Cast ==
- Chevy Chase as Irwin "Fletch" Fletcher
- Joe Don Baker as Chief Jerry Karlin
- Dana Wheeler-Nicholson as Gail Stanwyk
- Richard Libertini as Frank Walker
- Tim Matheson as Alan Stanwyk
- M. Emmet Walsh as Dr. Dolan
- George Wendt as Fat Sam
- Kenneth Mars as Stanton Boyd
- Geena Davis as Larry
- Bill Henderson as Speaker
- George Wyner as Marvin Gillet
- Larry "Flash" Jenkins as Gummy
- William Traylor as Ted Underhill
- Ralph Seymour as Creasy
- Tony Longo as Detective #1
- James Avery as Detective #2
- Reid Cruickshanks as Sergeant
- Bruce French as Dr. Holmes
- Burton Gilliam as Bud
- David Harper as Teenager stealing car
- Alison La Placa as Pan Am Clerk
- Joe Praml as Watchman
- William Sanderson as Jim Swarthout
- Penny Santon as Velma Stanwyk
- Robert Sorrells as Marvin Stanwyk
- Beau Starr as Willy

The film makes numerous references to Fletch's favorite team, the Los Angeles Lakers, and includes appearances by Lakers player Kareem Abdul-Jabbar and play-by-play announcer Chick Hearn, as themselves during Fletch's dream of playing for the Lakers.

== Production ==
=== Development ===
Following the publication of Gregory Mcdonald's novel Fletch in 1974, King-Hitzig Productions acquired the film rights. After multiple attempts by Columbia Pictures to film the novel, production stalled and the rights to Fletch were eventually acquired by producer Jonathan Burrows in 1976.

After Columbia passed on the film, Burrows shopped the film around to other studios. When there was no interest, Burrows tried a new tactic and submitted the script with a different title and put it in a different colored binder. Despite these efforts, there were still no takers, including Universal Pictures, the studio that would eventually produce and release the film. The studios and distributors that rejected Fletch between 1975 and 1981 were: Columbia, Metro-Goldwyn-Mayer, United Artists, 20th Century-Fox, Paramount, Warner Bros., American International, General Cinema, Allied Artists, Zanuck/Brown, Universal, Viacom, New Line Cinema, First Artists, Pathé, and Time Life Films. Burrows credits Michael Douglas (who much earlier was considered for the lead) for having the foresight and determination to get the film made; his half-brother Peter Douglas ultimately co-produced the film through his production company, Vincent Pictures.

When Mcdonald's Fletch books were optioned, the author retained the right to veto casting choices. He rejected both Burt Reynolds and Mick Jagger as Irwin "Fletch" Fletcher. When the studio mentioned Chevy Chase as Fletch, Mcdonald agreed, although he had never seen Chase perform.

Throughout the early stages of development, Jeff Bridges, Charles Grodin and Barry Bostwick were among those considered to play Fletch. George Segal was at one point considered, but turned it down. Burrows also wanted Richard Dreyfuss, after Chase initially rejected the part. Years later, Chase told Burrows that he never knew about the original offer and that it was his then manager who rejected it. In a 2004 interview with Entertainment Weekly, Chase confirmed this was his favorite and most successful part.

Chase did not officially agree to take the role until after producer Alan Greisman and screenwriter Andrew Bergman got involved. Mcdonald sent Chase a telegram saying, "I am delighted to abdicate the role of Fletch to you." Bergman remembers that he wrote the screenplay very fast. "I did the first draft in four weeks ... Then there was a certain amount of improv, and something that we used to call dial-a-joke," said Bergman. Phil Alden Robinson also did some uncredited work on the script.

Mcdonald read the script and was angered by the deviations from his original text. He wrote to the studio and listed his many objections. Director Michael Ritchie invited Mcdonald to the set of the film, and took him out to dinner where, according to Mcdonald, "Point by point, he showed me where I was wrong. I was beautifully chewed out."

=== Filming ===
Principal photography for Fletch began in May 1984. Parts of the film were shot in Salt Lake City International Airport, Provo and Orem, Utah, also Ogden, Utah, looking east from Mountain View Motel across the 24th Street viaduct.

According to actor Tim Matheson, Fletch was Chase's first film performance after recovering from his drug addiction. However, the studio hired director Michael Ritchie to keep Chase focused and comfortable on set. During principal photography, Ritchie would do one take sticking close to the script and then another take allowing Chase to ad-lib.

Chase enjoyed the role, because it allowed him to play a wide variety of different characters. He said in an interview, "I love props, like wigs and buck-teeth and glasses. At one point I wear an Afro and play basketball with Kareem Abdul-Jabbar. There were some scenes where I didn't recognize myself." The comedian enjoyed working with director Ritchie, because he gave him the freedom to improvise: "It all began when [co-star] Tim Matheson asked me what my name was. Right away, with a straight face: 'Ted Nugent'."

Chase recalls Ritchie as "Very intelligent. Very Tall (6'7"?) Trusting; allowing me so much freedom. Fine filmmaker!"

=== Post-production ===
"Chevy was very hot," recalled Bergman. "And the great thing was that Universal always thought Fletch was a hit movie, and they treated it like a hit, even when the first previews weren't that good. They never got frightened. They just said this is a hit, they were selling it like a hit, and then it was a hit. That was a very fun project."

The narration was added during post-production.

== Soundtrack ==
Fletch (Music From the Motion Picture Soundtrack)

Soundtrack album by Various artists
- Released: 1985
- Genre: Soundtrack
- Length: 36:13
- Label: MCA

1. "Bit by Bit (Theme from Fletch)" — Stephanie Mills 3:38
2. "Fletch, Get Outta Town" — Dan Hartman 4:11
3. "Running for Love" — John Farnham 2:54
4. "Name of the Game" — Dan Hartman 6:02
5. "Fletch Theme" — Harold Faltermeyer 3:48
6. "A Letter to Both Sides" — The Fixx 3:20
7. "Is It Over" — Kim Wilde 3:52
8. "Diggin' In" — Harold Faltermeyer 2:44
9. "Exotic Skates" — Harold Faltermeyer 3:00
10. "Running for Love" [instrumental] — Harold Faltermeyer 2:44

The soundtrack was mastered by Greg Fulginiti at Artisan Sound Recorders.

== Reception ==
=== Box office ===
Fletch was released on May 31, 1985, in 1,225 theaters, debuting at second place behind Rambo: First Blood Part II with a gross of $7 million. It went on to make $50.6 million in North America and $9 million in the rest of the world, for a worldwide total of $59.6 million. The film performed well on home video, earning $24.4 million in rentals.

=== Critical response ===
On review aggregator Rotten Tomatoes, 79% of 33 critics' reviews are positive, with an average rating of 6.8/10. The website's critics consensus reads: "Quotably funny – and fast-paced enough to smooth over the jokes that don't land – Fletch is one of the best big-screen vehicles for Chevy Chase's brand of smug silliness." On Metacritic, it has a score of 68 out of 100, based on 11 critics, indicating "generally favorable" reviews.

Film critic Roger Ebert gave the film two-and-a-half stars out of four. While the plot and supporting cast were praiseworthy, Ebert thought "the central performance is an anthology of Chevy Chase mannerisms in search of a character." Gene Siskel meanwhile called it his favorite film featuring Chase during a 1986 appearance on The Tonight Show Starring Johnny Carson, admiring the more genuine niceness of Chase's character compared to the actor's other roles. Vincent Canby in his review for The New York Times praised Chase's performance, writing, "He manages simultaneously to act the material with a good deal of nonchalance and to float above it, as if he wanted us to know that he knows that the whole enterprise is somewhat less than transcendental." Time magazine's Richard Schickel wrote, "In Fletch, the quick, smartly paced, gags somehow read as signs of vulnerability. Incidentally, they add greatly to the movie's suspense. Every minute you expect the hero's loose lip to be turned into a fat one." In his review for the Chicago Reader, Dave Kehr wrote, "Chase and Ritchie make a strong, natural combination: the union of their two flip, sarcastic personalities produces a fairly definitive example of the comic style of the 80s, grounded in detachment, underreaction, and cool contempt for rhetorically overblown authority figures."

Neil Gaiman reviewed Fletch for Imagine magazine, stating that it is "a very enjoyable detective comedy starring Chevy Chase as an undercover reporter who gets mixed up in a murder plot. Not as good as the Greg Mcdonald book it's based on."

=== Home media ===
Fletch was first released on VHS in 1985 by MCA Home Video. The first DVD release was in 1998, but that release quickly went out of print. Universal Home Video re-released a special edition of Fletch — the "Jane Doe" Edition on May 1, 2007. The film is presented in 1.85:1 anamorphic widescreen, along with an English Dolby Digital 5.1 Surround track and includes the retrospective featurettes, "Just Charge It to the Underhills: Making and Remembering Fletch," "From John Coctoastan to Harry S. Truman: The Disguises" and "Favorite Fletch Moments." IGN felt that this version was a decent replacement for anyone who still owned the film on VHS, but for "anyone seeking more than that will be sadly disappointed by the ill-executed extras and slap-dash sound upgrade."

Additionally, the film was also the next-to-last to be released by Universal on the HD DVD format, March 11, 2008, and later released on Blu-ray disc on June 2, 2009.

== Legacy ==
In an interview for the New York Post, Bergman tried to explain the film's appeal: "It's so bizarre, but Fletch strikes a chord. There's a group of movies like that in the '80s, like Caddyshack, too, that captured a certain wise-ass thing." In particular, the film appeals to college students who have asked Chase to talk about it at film classes. The actor has said that the appeal of the character is "the cheekiness of the guy ... everybody at that age would like to be as quick-witted as Fletch, and as uncaring about what others think." Chase said in 2007 how Fletch was his favorite film to that date as "it allowed me to be myself. Fletch was the first one with me really winging it. Even though there was a script, the director allowed me to just go, and in many ways, I was directing the comedy." In an interview with a Fletch fansite, Mcdonald himself stated: "I watched it recently, and I think Chevy and Michael Ritchie did a good job with it."

In 2008, the film was voted the 23rd best film set in Los Angeles in the previous 25 years by a group of Los Angeles Times writers and editors, with two criteria: "The movie had to communicate some inherent truth about the L.A. experience, and only one film per director was allowed on the list."

The 2005 animated feature Hoodwinked!, a parody of the Little Red Riding Hood story, depicts Wolf W. Wolf (Patrick Warburton), the Big Bad Wolf as a sarcastic investigative reporter in a direct parody of Fletch, right up to the Lakers shirt, disguises, and a version of Harold Faltermeyer's "Fletch Theme" playing during his scenes.

== Sequel and reboot ==
The film was followed by a 1989 sequel, Fletch Lives.

A follow-up to Fletch Lives had been discussed in the 1990s at Universal Studios. During his association with Universal after the production of Mallrats (this was because Gramercy Pictures, which released Mallrats, was co-owned by Universal), Kevin Smith expressed interest in doing a third Fletch film as a sequel starring Chevy Chase, but it never came to fruition. In June 2000, it was announced that Kevin Smith was set to write and direct a Fletch film at Miramax Films, after the rights to the books, which Universal Studios had owned, reverted. At the time, Miramax co-head Harvey Weinstein expressed the hope that a new Fletch series would be "Miramax Films' first-ever series."

After a disagreement between Chase and Smith in regard to differing levels of priority for the sequel project, Smith settled on adapting Fletch Won, which follows Fletch in his early years as a newspaper junior reporter. Smith intended to follow the novel's plot and characters much more closely than earlier Fletch films had. Filming the prequel/origin story would have allowed Smith to make the movie without Chase, while still leaving the door open for him to appear in a cameo role in framing scenes and/or as narrator. Around this time, Smith mentioned Jason Lee and Ben Affleck as possible choices to play Fletch.

In August 2003, it was reported that the film was set to start shooting in January, with Smith still at the helm. Though Smith insisted on casting Lee in the lead role, Miramax head Harvey Weinstein refused to take a chance on Lee, citing the general inability of his films to gross more than $30 million at the box office. The role of Fletch remained uncast, with Smith considering a list of actors including Affleck, Brad Pitt, and Jimmy Fallon. Though Smith considered compromising and casting Zach Braff in the role, he eventually left the project in October 2005.

Smith was replaced as writer/director by Scrubs creator Bill Lawrence, in what would have been his directorial debut. He had enthused, "Not only can I recite the original Fletch movie line for line, I actually read all the Greg Mcdonald books as a kid. Consider me obsessed — I'm going to try as hard as I can not to screw this up." Lawrence was signed to direct both Fletch Won and a sequel. Scrubs star Zach Braff was rumored to be in talks for the lead role, and in January 2007, Braff posted on his website that "Bill Lawrence is writing and directing Fletch in the spring and he wants me to play young Fletch, but no firm plans are in place yet. He is still writing the script." In April 2007, Braff announced that he had dropped out of the film to work on his own film, a remake of Open Hearts. In June 2007, it was announced that Lawrence was off the project and had been replaced by Steve Pink.

In 2011, rights to the project were purchased by Warner Bros., who requested screenplays from several writers that turned out to be unsuitable. In 2013, David List, who represents the Mcdonald estate, stepped in with his own draft, which proved attractive enough to engage Jason Sudeikis in the title role. The studio signed off on the screenplay, described as more of a "gritty action comedy with heart", and has begun looking for a director. In April 2015, the purposed film moved to Relativity Studios after Warner Bros. passed on the idea. However, Relativity Media went bankrupt later that year and again in 2018.

In July 2020, it was announced that a reboot was back on at Miramax. Based on the second book in the Fletch series, Confess, Fletch, Jon Hamm spearheaded the project as both star and producer, with Greg Mottola directing and Zev Borow writing. Confess, Fletch began filming in June 2021. It was released in a limited theatrical run and on premium video on demand on September 16, 2022, followed by a Showtime premiere on October 28, 2022. The remake received positive reviews from critics, with particular praise being given to Jon Hamm's performance as Irwin "Fletch" Fletcher.
