= Confess, Fletch =

2022 film by Greg Mottola

- Theatrical release poster
- Directed by: Greg Mottola
- Screenplay by: Greg Mottola; Zev Borow
- Based on: Confess, Fletch by Gregory Mcdonald
- Produced by: Connie Tavel; Bill Block; Jon Hamm
- Starring: Jon Hamm; Roy Wood Jr.; Annie Mumolo; Ayden Mayeri; Lorenza Izzo; John Slattery; Kyle MacLachlan; Marcia Gay Harden
- Cinematography: Sam Levy
- Edited by: Andy Keir
- Music by: David Arnold
- Production company: Miramax
- Distributed by: Paramount Pictures (uncredited)
- Release date: September 16, 2022
- Running time: 98 minutes
- Country: United States
- Language: English
- Budget: $20 million
- Box office: $656,613

Confess, Fletch is a 2022 American crime comedy film directed by Greg Mottola, who co-wrote the screenplay with Zev Borow. Based on Gregory Mcdonald's 1976 novel of the same name, it stars Jon Hamm, Roy Wood Jr., Annie Mumolo, Ayden Mayeri, Lorenza Izzo, Kyle MacLachlan, and Marcia Gay Harden. It is the third Fletch film adaptation following Fletch (1985) and Fletch Lives (1989), and the first not to star Chevy Chase.

Confess, Fletch was released in the United States in select theaters and on premium video on demand on September 16th, 2022, before a Showtime premiere on October 28th, 2022. Despite receiving generally positive reviews, it was a box office failure, grossing roughly $660,000 against a budget of $20 million.

== Plot ==
Freelance writer and former investigative journalist Irwin Maurice "Fletch" Fletcher is hired by a billionaire Italian count to investigate the whereabouts of his missing art collection. Fletch soon has a first lead; Boston art dealer Ronald Horan has sold two of the paintings. In Rome, Fletch meets Angela, the attractive daughter of his client, and a love affair develops between the two. Angela then receives news from the police that her father has apparently been kidnapped by organized criminals who are demanding a Picasso from the missing collection as ransom.

As Fletch arrives in a short-term rented townhouse in Boston, he finds a dead woman, subsequently identified as barista Laurel Goodwin. Despite reporting the crime to the police, Fletch becomes the prime suspect in the murder. Sergeant Inspector Monroe and Junior Detective Griz of the Boston Police Department begin tailing him, which he thwarts numerous times to continue his investigation without interference.

Fletch meets Horan under a false identity in an attempt to buy the stolen Picasso. He learns from his neighbor Eve that Owen, the townhouse owner, has a history of violence and drug abuse and an estranged spouse named Tatiana, who used to be his business partner. Fletch meets with Tatiana, again using a false identity, and adds her to his growing suspect list.

Meanwhile, the Countess, Angela's stepmother, invites herself to stay with Fletch. Fletch gains entry to Horan's yacht at a country club and retrieves several paintings, including the Picasso. Angela arrives in Boston, suspecting that the Countess kidnapped the Count, but initially maintains a friendly facade.

At dinner that night, Fletch, the Countess, and Angela are visited by Owen, Tatiana, and Eve. Laurel's boyfriend arrives inebriated with the intention to avenge Laurel by killing Fletch, but he is overpowered and consoled in his grief. Angela, who has been exposed as a friend of Owen, abruptly leaves. Fletch follows her to Horan's house then to his yacht, where he confronts her, assuming that she stole the paintings and used Owen to smuggle them to Horan for sale. However, Horan reveals that he killed Laurel and framed Fletch to thwart his investigation. He then planned to deceive Angela and pay his debts by selling the Count's art collection. Horan attempts to kill Fletch but is shot dead by Griz.

The Count, who had faked his kidnapping with the help of Fletch in order to test his wife and daughter's love, arrives and persuades Fletch to keep the paintings. From an undisclosed location in Central America, Fletch sends paintings to the Countess, Eve, his previous boss, and two street artists, and a large check to Laurel's boyfriend and her family.

== Cast ==
- Jon Hamm as Irwin Maurice "Fletch" Fletcher
- Roy Wood Jr. as Sergeant Inspector Morris Monroe
- Annie Mumolo as Eve, Owen's neighbor
- Ayden Mayeri as Junior Detective "Griz" Grizelda
- Lorenza Izzo as Angela de Grassi
- John Slattery as Frank Jaffe, Fletch's old boss who now runs the Boston Sentinel
- Kenneth Kimmins as the commodore
- John Behlmann as Owen Tasserly
- Lucy Punch as Tatiana Tasserly, Owen's ex-wife
- Robert Picardo as Count Clementi Arbogastes de Grassi
- Kyle MacLachlan as Ronald Horan, a Boston art dealer
- Marcia Gay Harden as Countess Sylvia de Grassi
- Erica McDermott as detective #3
- Eugene Mirman as Marv, the yacht club security guard

== Production ==
Following the release of Fletch (1985) and Fletch Lives (1989) starring Chevy Chase, attempts to reboot the series based on the Gregory Mcdonald novels frequently became mired in development hell. Names such as Kevin Smith and Jason Lee, Bill Lawrence and Zach Braff, and Jason Sudeikis were previously attached to the property.

According to director Greg Mottola, screenwriter Zev Borow was first brought on to pen a film adaptation of Confess, Fletch from the Fletch series of books. Later, Jon Hamm approached Mottola with interest in a Fletch film, noting that Miramax had the rights to all of the novels apart from the first one. Following this, Mottola took over Borow's script, adding more elements from the book and shifting its focus from slapstick similar to Chase's films to more verbal comedy.

Though Bill Block, CEO of Miramax at the time, was an ardent supporter of the project and allowed Mottola full creative freedom, he could only fully finance the film for up to 27 days of shooting. More financial partners were sought, but all of them passed on the project. Eventually, Hamm and Mottola decided to return portions of their salaries to the production budget, with the former reportedly contributing 60% of his initial income.

In July 2020, it was reported that Hamm would star in and produce an adaptation of the Mcdonald novel Confess, Fletch directed by Mottola. In June 2021, Marcia Gay Harden, Kyle MacLachlan, Roy Wood Jr., and John Slattery joined the cast. The following month, Ayden Mayeri, Lorenza Izzo, and Annie Mumolo were added to the cast.

Principal photography began in Boston on June 28, 2021. In early July, scenes were filmed in Worcester, Massachusetts, outside the local police department. Hamm and Mottola's contributions allowed for three more shooting days in addition to the 27-day shooting schedule, totalling to 30 days in Boston and one in Rome.

== Reception ==
On the review aggregator website Rotten Tomatoes, 86% of 129 critics' reviews are positive, with an average rating of 6.6/10. The website's consensus reads: "Shorter on wacky hijinks but still very funny, Confess, Fletch is a showcase for Jon Hamm's comedic chops that revives this long-dormant franchise with style." Metacritic, which uses a weighted average, assigned the film a score of 64 out of 100, based on 32 critics, indicating "generally favorable" reviews.

== Cancelled sequel ==
Shortly after the film's release, Mottola said he had been hired to write a sequel based on the 1978 novel Fletch's Fortune, but said he was "not sure" if it would be produced. In August 2024, Mottola said that the sequel was no longer in development, with the director attributing the setback to a change of leadership at Miramax and the film underperforming at the box office.
