= Ayden Mayeri =

Iranian-American actress and comedian

- Born: January 10, 1990 (age 36); Oakland, California, U.S.
- Notable work: Cora Bora; Jackpot! Somebody I Used to Know

Comedy career
- Years active: 2012–present
- Medium: Stand-up; film; television
- Genres: Observational comedy; sketch comedy; insult comedy; sarcasm
- Subjects: human sexuality; pop culture

Ayden Mayeri (born October 1, 1990) is an American actress, comedian, singer and writer, known for her work in both television and film. On television, she had a recurring role in Homecoming (2018), starred in the Showtime series I Love That for You (2022), and starred in the Peacock comedy Mr. Throwback. Mayeri has appeared in the films Somebody I Used to Know (2023), Confess, Fletch (2022), Jackpot! (2024), and Honeyjoon (2025).

== Early life ==
Ayden Mayeri was born on October 1, 1990, in Oakland, California, United States. She grew up in Northern California and became interested in theater at a young age. In 2000, at age 12, Mayeri and her friends Jessica, Janet, and Mary recorded an album, Stardust, under the name X-Cetra. She attended California State University, Fullerton, where she initially studied political science before switching to theater. She left college and moved to Los Angeles to pursue acting.

During the 2020 COVID-19 lockdowns, the recordings were uploaded to Rate Your Music. A record label later approached the group about releasing the recordings on vinyl. Mayeri and the other members reunited, recorded a new song, and began working on a documentary about X-Cetra.

== Career ==
=== Television ===
Mayeri began her acting career in the early 2010s with minor roles in television shows. Her breakout came with appearances in TV series Harder Than It Looks. She guest-starred in the Fox sitcom New Girl.

In 2019, Mayeri appeared in multiple episodes of the political satire Veep on HBO, She also made guest appearances on Larry David's iconic show Curb Your Enthusiasm. In 2022, she joined the cast of the Apple TV+ murder-mystery comedy The Afterparty, playing a pregnant mean girl who goes missing. In 2024, Mayeri was a main cast member on the Peacock comedy series Mr. Throwback.

=== Film ===
Mayeri appeared in the films Grown Ups (2010), Concerning the Bodyguard (2015), We Are Your Friends (2015), Home Again (2017), Random Tropical Paradise (2017), Alex Strangelove (2018), Into the Dark: Midnight Kiss (2019), Before You Know It (2019), Spin Me Round (2022), Confess, Fletch (2022), and Cora Bora (2023),

In August 2024, Mayeri was cast in the Amazon MGM Studios 2024 film Jackpot!.

== Other work ==
In addition to her work on screen, Mayeri is also a writer and has contributed to various comedy sketches and digital content.

== Personal life ==
Mayeri married screenwriter and producer M. Miller Davis in 2018. She is a fan of American basketball player Stephen Curry.

== Filmography ==
=== Film ===
Year	Title	Role	Notes
2012	Argo	Flight Attendant	
2012	The Confident Homeless Man	Girl	Short
2012	Haven's Point	Sam	Short
2013	Co-Op	Sarah	Short
2013	Losing California	Stephanie	Short
2013	Chastity Bites	Pregnant Girl	
2014	The Suneater	Nora	Short
2014	Separated	Woman	Short
2015	We Are Your Friends	Rich Girl	
2015	Concerning the Bodyguard	Mistress	Short
2015	Body	Renee	Short
2015	The Dazzling Darling Sisters	Banana Girl	Short
2016	Mike and Dave Need Wedding Dates	Apartment Ayden	
2017	Random Tropical Paradise	Johanna Lacroix	
2018	Don't Worry, He Won't Get Far on Foot	Brenda	
2018	Alex Strangelove	Hillary	
2019	Before You Know It	Celia	
2019	Heirloom	Cecily	Short
2019	Marriage Story	Make-Up Artist	
2019	Thirsty	Jo	Short
2020	Wander Darkly	Summer	
2022	Spin Me Round	Jen	
2022	Confess, Fletch	Griz	
2023	Somebody I Used to Know	Kayla	
2023	Cora Bora	Riley	
2024	Jackpot!	Shadi	
2025	Honeyjoon	June	
2026	She Keeps Me Young		
2026	Bad Day		Complete

=== Television ===
Year	Title	Role	Notes
2012	Harder Than It Looks	Ayden	Main cast
2016	Life in Pieces	Tulip	Episode: "Pestilence War Famine Death"
2016	Faking It	Pepper	Episode: "Third Wheels"
2016	Awkward	Foodie Girl	Episode: "Misadventures in Babysitting"
2016	Comedy Bang! Bang!	Cybernetic Dating Representative	Episode: "The Lonely Island Wear Dark Pants and Eyeglasses"
2016–17	Relevant	Amal Clooney	Recurring cast
2016–18	New Girl	Leslie Nelson	Recurring cast (season 6), guest (season 7)
2017	Workaholics	Army	Episode: "Faux Chella"
2017	Downward Dog	Gwen	Recurring cast
2017	Crazy Ex-Girlfriend	Carla	Episode: "Josh Is a Liar."
2018	Loosely Exactly Nicole	Edi	Recurring cast (season 2)
2018	Single Parents	Heather	Episode: "Pilot"
2018	Homecoming	Reina	Recurring cast (season 1)
2019	Now Apocalypse	Ananda	Episode: "Anywhere Out of the World"
2019	Veep	Layla	Recurring cast (season 7)
2019	Historical Roasts	Cleopatra	Episode: "Cleopatra"
2019	A.P. Bio	Kate	Episode: "Kinda Sorta"
2019	Into the Dark	Hannah	Episode: "Midnight Kiss"
2020	Grace and Frankie	Skye	Recurring cast (season 6)
2022	The Afterparty	Jennifer #2	Recurring cast (season 1)
2022	I Love That for You	Beth Ann	Main cast
2022	Central Park	(voice)	Recurring cast (season 3)
2023	History of the World: Part II	Cave Woman	Episode: "I"
2023	Killing It	Blythe	Episode: "Help Me Pay My Bills"
2023	Big Mouth	Gabrielle (voice)	Recurring cast (season 7)
2024	Mr. Throwback	Sam Judlow	Main cast

=== Music video ===
Year	Artist	Song	Role
2018	Punch Punch Kick	"Licking My Wounds"	Gladiator
