= Fletch (novel) =

Novel by Gregory Mcdonald

- First edition cover
- Author: Gregory Mcdonald
- Language: English
- Series: Fletch
- Genre: Mystery, comedy novel
- Publisher: Bobbs-Merrill
- Publication date: 1974
- Publication place: United States
- Media type: Print (Hardback & Paperback)
- ISBN: 0-672-52020-6 (first edition, paperback)
- OCLC: 1196587
- Dewey Decimal: 813/.5/4
- LC Class: PZ4.M13473 Fl PS3563.A278
- Followed by: Confess, Fletch

Fletch is a 1974 mystery novel by Gregory Mcdonald, the first in a series featuring the character Irwin Maurice Fletcher.

== Synopsis ==
I. M. Fletcher is a journalist and former Marine. Camping undercover on a beach, he is observing the drug culture for a story. He wants to find the origin of a dealer's seemingly endless supply of drugs before publishing an exposé.

Fletch is approached by Alan Stanwyck, a millionaire airline industry businessman who asks Fletch to murder him. Stanwyck claims he is dying of bone cancer and wants to avoid a slow, painful death and his life insurance is invalid if he kills himself. Fletch accepts $1,000 in cash to listen to the proposition. Believing Fletch is a vagrant and addict, Stanwyck offers him $20,000 to commit the murder. Fletch negotiates his fee to $50,000 in an effort to see if the man is serious. Stanwyck appears to be sincere.

Fletch begins investigating the man's story as he faces additional pressure from two attorneys chasing him for alimony for each of his ex-wives.

By interviewing Stanwyck's friends and family under a variety of pretexts, a baffled Fletch discovers Stanwyck seems to be in good health and happily married with no plausible reason to kill himself. However, further investigation uncovers Stanwyck's affair with a high school sweetheart and a plan to murder Fletch and steal his identity before flying to South America with millions in cash obtained from converting stock shares. Given their similar physical builds, Stanwyck intends to stage a horrendous car crash that will have people presume Fletch's burned corpse is his own.

Meanwhile, Fletch deduces the police are trafficking drugs on the beach. When the drug supply runs low, police appear and manhandle a few vagrants, covertly passing drugs to their dealer amid the commotion. The police chief shoots and kills Stanwyck, whom he has mistaken for Fletch.

Fletch uses the ticket Stanwyck bought in his name and flies to South America with Stanwyck's money.

== Sequels ==
Because of the popularity of Fletch, many sequels (and prequels) were written involving the character. The following books were written in the Fletch series by Gregory McDonald (in the stories' chronological order):

- Fletch Won (1985)
- Fletch, Too (1986)
- Fletch and the Widow Bradley (1981)
- Fletch (1974)
- Carioca Fletch (1984)
- Confess, Fletch (1976)
- Fletch's Fortune (1978)
- Fletch's Moxie (1982)
- Fletch and the Man Who (1983)
- Son of Fletch (1993)
- Fletch Reflected (1994)

McDonald wanted the final two books (featuring Fletch's son Jack) to be spin-offs called Jack's Story and Jack and the Perfect Mirror, respectively. While Fletch himself appears in both novels, the focus of these books (especially the second one) is more on Jack.

In Confess, Fletch, McDonald introduced another popular character, Inspector Francis Xavier Flynn, a brilliant but eccentric police detective who serves as a foil for Fletch. Flynn would go on to star in four of his own spin-off novels: Flynn (1977), The Buck Passes Flynn (1981), Flynn's In (1984), and Flynn's World (2003). Fletch is mentioned in passing in Flynn, but does not actually appear as a character in any of the Flynn spin-off books.

== Awards and nominations ==
Fletch won a 1975 Edgar Allan Poe Award, for Best First Novel, from the Mystery Writers of America. The sequel, Confess, Fletch, also won an Edgar Award, for Best Paperback Original, in 1977. As Mcdonald's official website notes: "The only time a novel and its sequel won back-to-back Edgars."

== Adaptations ==
The novel was adapted into a comedy film, Fletch (1985), directed by Michael Ritchie and starring Chevy Chase; the film was a critical and commercial hit, earning $59 million in revenue.

A sequel film, Fletch Lives (1989), featured an original screenplay instead of adapting one of McDonald's novels.

An attempt to reboot the Fletch series languished in development hell for decades afterwards. Writer/director Kevin Smith was attached to the project from the mid-1990s to the mid-2000s, first with an attempt to make a sequel starring Chase, then with an attempt to adapt Fletch Won, potentially to star Jason Lee or Ben Affleck. By 2003, Smith had broadened his search for a leading actor to include names such as Brad Pitt, Will Smith, Jimmy Fallon and Adam Sandler. By 2006, Smith was off the project, replaced by Bill Lawrence, in what would have been his directorial debut. In 2014, Jason Sudeikis was set to star in a Fletch Won film, which was planned as the first in a series, but the reboot went no further than 2019.

The series was successfully rebooted in September 2022 with the release of Confess, Fletch, an adaptation of the novel of the same name, starring Jon Hamm and directed by Greg Mottola.
