= Jennifer Falls =

Television series

- Genre: Sitcom
- Created by: Matthew Carlson
- Starring: Jaime Pressly; Missi Pyle; Ethan Suplee; Nora Kirkpatrick; Dylan Gelula; Jessica Walter
- Composer: Chris Allen Lee
- Country of origin: United States
- Original language: English
- No. of seasons: 1
- No. of episodes: 10

Production
- Executive producers: Matthew Carlson; Larry W. Jones; Jaime Pressly; Keith Cox; Mindy Schultheis; Michael Hanel
- Camera setup: Single-camera
- Running time: 30 minutes
- Production companies: Vanity Logo Productions; Acme Productions; TV Land Original Productions

Original release
- Network: TV Land
- Release: June 4 – August 13, 2014

Jennifer Falls is an American sitcom created by Matthew Carlson, and starring Jaime Pressly in the title role. The series premiered on TV Land on June 4, 2014, and is the first single-camera comedy series for the network. It was cancelled on October 3, 2014, after ten episodes.

== Plot ==
The series follows Jennifer Doyle (Jaime Pressly), a single mother who, after losing her high salary job, has to move back in with her mother, Maggie (Jessica Walter). From there, Jennifer must reassess her life and figure out how to rebuild.

== Cast ==
=== Main ===
- Jaime Pressly as Jennifer Doyle
- Jessica Walter as Maggie Doyle, Jennifer's mother
- Missi Pyle as Dina Simac, Jennifer's childhood friend
- Ethan Suplee as Wayne Doyle, Jennifer's brother
- Nora Kirkpatrick as Stephanie Doyle, Jennifer's sister-in-law
- Dylan Gelula as Gretchen Doyle, Jennifer's daughter

=== Recurring ===
- Chris D'Elia as Adam, Jennifer's younger ex-boyfriend and Gretchen's father

== Episodes ==
No.	Title	Directed by	Written by	Original release date	US viewers (millions)
1	"Pilot"	Lee Shallat Chemel	Matthew Carlson	June 4, 2014	0.890
Despite being a top performer, Jennifer is fired from her VP position at a Fortune 500 company because her anger issues have made both customers and co-workers afraid to work with her. Broke and soon to be homeless, she and her daughter, Gretchen, are forced to move back in with Jennifer's mother, Maggie. To make ends meet, Jennifer accepts a position at her brother Wayne's sports bar, where she must now deal with her condescending sister-in-law, Stephanie, being her boss. Jennifer also tries to figure out why her childhood friend, Dina, refuses to speak to her.
2	"Health Club"	Peter Lauer	Michael Glouberman	June 11, 2014	0.744
Jennifer realizes she still has a year left on her posh health club membership. After a failed attempt to get a partial refund, she decides to spend a day in the spa and runs into two women from her old office. Desperate to keep up appearances, Jennifer agrees to dinner with the women, which forces her to cancel the bowling-dinner plans she had made with Dina. To make things right, Jennifer takes Dina to a concert by her favorite group, The Black Keys, only to ditch Dina again when she discovers her workmates are in a luxury box at the concert along with Jennifer's former client. Elsewhere, Maggie tries to convince Wayne and Stephanie that they are running out of time to give her a grandchild.
3	"Triangle"	Peter Lauer	Matthew Carlson	June 18, 2014	0.734
4	"The Virginity Thief"	Peter Lauer	Todd Linden	June 25, 2014	0.681
Jennifer and Dina discover that an old classmate is still in town, and that he took the virginity of each on the same night back in the mid-90s. They are determined to get back at him, but each falls for his games once again. Elsewhere, Wayne discovers his grandmother's ring that Stephanie is wearing is a fake, and Maggie admits she made a duplicate and kept the original because she didn't think the marriage would last. Wayne tries to guilt his mom into buying his forgiveness, but Maggie is one step ahead of him.
5	"Staycation"	Victor Nelli Jr.	Matthew Carlson	July 9, 2014	0.665
Unable to afford the trip to Bora Bora that Jennifer had promised to Gretchen for her good grades, she instead rewards her daughter with a fun “staycation” in the backyard. But unexpected job interviews and family drama threaten to ruin the party.
6	"School Trouble"	Eyal Gordin	Christine Zander	July 16, 2014	0.454
When Gretchen gets suspended for a skirmish at school, and there is evidence that she is involved in more trouble, Jennifer realizes she hasn't been there to help her daughter grow up. So she consults the woman who knows Gretchen the most: her former maid, Lupe. While waiting with Jennifer to see the principal about Gretchen, Dina notices her name is no longer on the trophy for the basketball scoring record. She seeks out the girl who broke her record, and challenges her to a one-on-one contest. Elsewhere, Wayne is trying every trick in the book to get Stephanie pregnant, but Stephanie is secretly still taking the pill.
7	"Three Dates with My Mother"	Jeff Melman	Matthew Carlson	July 23, 2014	0.568
A stressed-out Jennifer convinces her entire family to see a psychiatrist (Kurt Fuller) for family counseling, which rubs her psychologist mother the wrong way. The counselor suggests that Wayne be more assertive with Stephanie, and orders Jennifer and Maggie to go on a dinner date and have an honest discussion about their issues. He also suggests that Jennifer should give Gretchen a week to do whatever she wants, as long as she still attends school and does nothing illegal. Near the end of the week, Gretchen realizes she is out of control and begs to have boundaries again.
8	"Dads and Dogs"	Rebecca Asher	Susan Beavers	July 30, 2014	0.614
Adam, Gretchen's dad, comes back into hers and her mother's life. Though he has always been an easy target for blame, the tables are turned when he gives Gretchen a car and announces he's finally signed a major record deal. Meanwhile, Wayne gets a dog and struggles to keep the pet in line. But when he comes up with a solution to training the pet, Stephanie sees that he might actually make a good father.
9	"Everybody Loves Adam"	Victor Nelli Jr.	Bryan Behar & Steve Baldikoski	August 6, 2014	0.768
Jennifer and Adam both attend Gretchen's school debate, which her team wins. Gretchen decides to attend the school's father-daughter dance with Adam, which upsets Wayne, who had already made plans to accompany his niece. Adam makes things worse when Gretchen's teacher praises how well she was raised, and he takes the credit. Elsewhere, Stephanie tries to become "besties" with Dina, and shares her secret about taking the pill behind Wayne's back.
10	"Jennifer's Song"	Jeff Melman	Marsh McCall	August 13, 2014	0.619
Jennifer and Adam make plans to move into his home, which thrills Gretchen. Jennifer later learns, however, that Adam not only kept a secret about having a green card wife, but he also lied about his record deal and owes a recording studio $8,000 (plus one Greek yogurt). Meanwhile, Stephanie confides to Maggie "as a patient" that she has deceived Wayne, causing Maggie to try and break the news to a clueless Wayne by way of a thinly-veiled story.

== Production and development ==
On August 5, 2013, TV Land placed a multi-camera pilot order on Jennifer Falls, with Jaime Pressly identified for the lead role. The pilot was written by Matthew Carlson. Larry W. Jones, Jaime Pressly, Keith Cox, Mindy Schultheis and Michael Hanel serve as executive producers, alongside Acme Productions.

Casting announcements on the remaining series regular roles began in September 2013, with Missi Pyle first cast in the role of Dina, Jennifer's childhood best friend, who is hesitant to restart the friendship when Jennifer returns to town. Dylan Gelula was the next actor cast in the series regular role of Gretchen, Jennifer's energetic and complicated daughter. Jessica Walter then joined the series as Maggie, Jennifer's warm and welcoming yet slightly narcissistic mother. Shortly after, Nora Kirkpatrick and Joel David Moore were cast in the series, with Kirkpatrick cast in the role of Stephanie, Jennifer's sister-in-law and new boss. Moore was tapped play the role of Wayne, Jennifer's brother who owns the bar where she begins to work.

On January 27, 2014, TV Land placed a series order on Jennifer Falls, set to premiere in 2014. The series was originally conceived as a multi-camera before being converted into single-camera. A month after the series order, Ethan Suplee replaced Joel David Moore in the role of Wayne, reuniting Pressly and Suplee who had previously co-starred together in My Name is Earl. In My Name Is Earl, Suplee had played Pressly's former brother-in-law whereas in Jennifer Falls he played her brother.Jennifer Falls is the second TV Land original series in which Jessica Walter has appeared, following the sitcom Retired at 35 which was cancelled in 2012 after two seasons.

== Reception ==
On Rotten Tomatoes, the series has an aggregate score of 56% based on 5 positive and 4 negative critic reviews.
