= Dorm Life =

- Dorm Life: Semester One DVD cover
- Created by: Attention Span Media; Jim Brandon; Jack DeSena; Jessie Gaskell; Mark Stewart Iverson; Jordan Riggs; Brian Singleton; Chris Smith
- Starring: Chris Smith; Brian Singleton; Jim Brandon; Jack DeSena; Jordan Riggs; Pancho Morris; Jessie Gaskell; Hannah Pearl; Anne Lane; Nora Kirkpatrick
- Country of origin: United States
- No. of seasons: 2
- No. of episodes: 46

Production
- Running time: 400 minutes

Original release
- Release: February 4, 2008 – July 20, 2009

Dorm Life is a mockumentary web series created by former students of UCLA. It follows the fictional lives of the inhabitants of the college dorm floor 5 South. It is produced by Attention Span Media, a Los Angeles based social media studio and is a 2008 Webby Honoree for Best Writing and Comedy: Individual Short or Episode. Dorm Life is also Hulu's most watched web show.

After a successful first season, Dorm Life returned for a second season with sponsor Carl's Jr..

== Overview ==
The fictional show is made in the form of a documentary that purports to record the lives of actual college freshmen. It takes place almost entirely within their dorm floor, 5 South. Each character has a webcam for the purpose of individual reflection or addresses to the audience. There are also separate webcam clips aside from those of the main episodes, as well as profiles maintained by each character on the website's "community lounge," with interactions between them and with fans on the website's forum.

== Cast ==
=== Main cast ===
- Chris W. Smith as Michael "Mike" Sanders, the de facto main character of the series. He is very thoughtful and loves to laugh. He tries to get along with everyone, and is often the one planning fun activities for his floormates. Mike begins his freshman year still attached to his steady girlfriend, Emily, who is still in high school. The relationship is strained by the long distance, and they break up over Thanksgiving break, in the episode "Turkey Drop". Near the end of the first semester, Mike found out that Brittany had had a crush on him, but he ruined any chance of a relationship by sleeping with Courtney after a night of partying in "Group Shot". After that, he started to become isolated from the rest of the floor. Due to these feelings of isolation, he hooks up with Emily again over Christmas Break. Mike has some resentment that his friend and roommate, Josh, is distancing himself from the floor so he can be a documentarian, mainly following Mike's depression. Mike's friendships are healed in the episode "The Frat Party", when Gopher, Shane, and Danny B join Mike in a fight with a frat guy that is insulting Brittany. Brittany and Mike start their friendship again during the Spring Break episodes, but they decide to be only friends, and nothing more. In the episode "Dormal", Mike and Brittany finally kiss, to the relief of the rest of their floormates. However, after they kiss again, they agree that it is too awkward and forced, and that they were better as strictly friends. Mike loves improvised games and pranks, and also has several "random skills" such as juggling, moving his ears, and balancing objects on his nose and chin. Throughout the year, Mike hosts "The Mike Sanders Show" on his webcam, where he interviews various people of interest.
- Jack DeSena as Shane Reilly, party animal, Gopher's best friend, and the floor president of 5 South. He is a musical prodigy, and he is at college on full scholarship. His catchphrase is "Probly", he always wears a black T-shirt which reads "My Friend Sam is 50", and he is bisexual, shown in several episodes ("The Screening", "Moving Out [Part 2]"). He is almost constantly seen drinking alcohol, and rarely seen attending classes. After Shane misses all of his finals of the first semester, he has to meet with Dean Tomlinson, and is told that he will be placed on academic probation. Danny B decides to take a history class with him and be his tutor, and throughout the second semester, helps Shane get his academics back on track. In the episode "Dormal", Shane shows some improvement in his studies, so much so that Daniel allows him to go to "Dormal". Besides being a piano prodigy, Shane has also shown his potential to be a good student with his expansive knowledge of sports trivia. He is seen rattling off stats on Brittany's boyfriend, Derrick Johnson, in the episode "Markers", and he participates on Daniel's team in the episode "Quiz Bowl", specializing in sports questions. Throughout the year, Shane helps Mike with "The Mike Sanders Show", and stars with Gopher in the imitation sketches on their webcam. Shane also develops his own spin-off of Daniel's webcam titled "Not Fun Facts with Shane". While he is often a major goof-off, Shane is actually very caring and eager to help his friends, such as when he helps Gopher serenade Abigail in "Valentines Day" and when he comforts a crying Mike in "The Frat Party". He is also the first person to openly say that Danny B's girlfriend Lacey is a little "crazy".
- Jim Brandon as Gopher Reed, party animal, and Shane's best friend/roommate. All of his T-shirts have various pictures of himself printed on them. He is the big clown of the floor, often acting a certain way to be humorous. When being himself, however, he is very caring and helpful. Early on, his other roommate, Daniel, dislikes him because he encourages all of Shane's antics, but they later become close friends after Gopher helps him to talk to a girl and get her phone number. Early in season 2, a few weeks after seeing a screening of the first season, Gopher figures that if he's going to be an internet sensation, he may as well make a profit. Thus, he and Shane begin advertising for "SexZ BoiZ" body spray throughout the series and use the money to buy beer. In "Teamwork", Gopher develops a crush on his much more conservative floormate, Abigail. Though his efforts to woo Abigail were originally rebuffed because she is engaged, he slowly becomes friends with her, and their relationship is turning more romantic as the year winds down. Throughout the year, Gopher and Shane record short webcam videos imitating their floormates and people of interest on the show.
- Pancho Morris as Josh Morgan, an eccentric drama student and Mike's roommate. Josh was raised in Russia, though little else is known about his background. In the episode "Parents' Weekend", he attempts to fake his own parents' visit, hiring an actress to play his mother and paying his dad to take part in their "scenes." He is best known for his bizarre behavior, which includes pretending to commit seppuku with a marker, sneaking around the floor wearing a Mexican wrestling mask, walking around completely naked, eating Mike's deodorant, and storing his food in his air conditioning vent since he doesn't own a refrigerator. In "Come (Out) Today", Josh performs his self-discovery play, and the floor is very impressed with his theatrical talent. In the episode "A Capella", Josh began working on his very own 5-South documentary film, which very rapidly devolves into a gross overdramatization of his floormates, particularly Mike. In "Blood, Sweat, and Tears" his docu-drama titled "Return To Dormalcy" is screened by his floormates and is greeted with a poor response, as nearly everyone is either drowsy or offended. He often attempts to come up with his own pranks and games like Mike does, but they are poorly-conceived and often backfire on him. In "Floor Dinner", Josh switched places with a homeless woman named Linda to do a performance piece underneath the Lincoln Bridge. He lives there with a homeless man named Hampton. Josh returns to 5-South in "Dormal" because he realizes that he needs his friends. During Dormal, there is footage of Josh making up with Mike.
- Jordan Riggs as Daniel "Danny B" Benjamin, an intelligent pre-pharm student who (reluctantly) shares a room with Shane and Gopher. Their relationship is highly strained at first, but Daniel eventually forms a strong bond with both of his roommates, going to Gopher for advice about girls and assisting Shane in his studies. They return the favor by helping him officially meet his "Mystery Hot Girl". Danny B's strict upbringing from his single mother has made him an upstanding adult figure, but influence from his floormates has had him loosening up and having fun in college. In "The Frat Party", with Courtney's coaching, he had his first kiss with a girl named Lacey. The two date for a while, but her clingyness is smothering him, and he dumps her in front of the entire floor in "Floor Dinner." Danny B is a black belt in Karate and often displays his martial arts talents throughout the series (his skills come in handy during the fight in "The Frat Party"). A lover of all things academic, he regularly hosts a webcam segment on the show's website titled "Fun Facts With Daniel Benjamin" in which he describes seemingly random bits of trivia relating to anything from biology to American history.
- Brian Singleton as Marshall Adams I, the competitive, egocentric, and abusive resident assistant of 5 South. He was secretly hooking up with a resident, Steph Schwartzman, but he decided to make it official in "A Capella". His demeaning behavior eventually led her to dump him in the episode "Abby's Party". His catch phrase, "So Rad Dude", is expressed in several episodes. It is widely known that he hates Mike; he tries in any way to embarrass him or ruin his fun. In "Marshall's New Hat", it's revealed that his overbearing and demeaning personality stems from a great deal of jealousy that he harbors for his substantially more likable identical twin, William. In the episode "Dormal", Marshall wins RA of the Year over the more-qualified Yassi from 5-North and will be Residential Director for the next school year.
- Jessie Gaskell as Stephanie "Steph" Schwartzman, a cheerful student who had a relationship with Marshall. She is very energetic, enjoys planning many events for the floor, and wants everyone to have fun. Steph's overzealous nature serves as one of the series' primary running gags, though it greatly annoys her antithetical roommate, Abigail. Their relationship is strained due to her inability to pay attention to Abby's wishes regarding living together, as well as stealing Abby's diary and reading it live on her webcam. Steph eventually broke up with Marshall in "Abby's Party," which was followed by her falling down a flight of stairs, breaking both of her tibias. From the episode "Blood, Sweat, and Tears" through the end of the season, she uses a wheelchair. Steph has been recommended to be a Resident Assistant for next school year, but hasn't revealed whether or not she has accepted a position.
- Hannah Pearl Utt as Brittany "Brit" Wilcox, best friend and roommate of Courtney. She dated the school's basketball star, Derrick Johnson, but broke up with him just before the team's March Madness debut. She once had a crush on Mike, which was obvious to everyone except him, but ended it after he and Courtney hooked up while drunk. However, when "the guys" (all the primary male characters with the exception of Marshall) call her during their spring break road trip, she spends a significant amount of time conversing with Mike and subsequently appears to have made amends with him in "Tour De 5-South" in which the two are seen participating in a laser-tag game throughout the floor. In the next episode, "Marshall's New Plan", this playful trend continues; however, Brit tells Mike that she doesn't "want anything romantic" and both agree to place each other in 'the friend zone.' At the start of the series, Brit's character seems identical to Courtney (somewhat shallow and air-headed), but she gradually moves away from this mold to become her own person.
- Nora Kirkpatrick as Courtney Cloverlock, best friend and roommate of Brittany. She is a singer and has released an album called "Four-Leaf Clover." She loves to party, get drunk, and hook up with random guys. Courtney has hooked up with Gopher in "Date Party", Mike in "Group Shot," and Marshall (in disguise as William) in "Marshall's New Plan". All but the first of these incidents resulted in a huge amount of relationship tension on the floor, and she's therefore been described by Steph as "an ignorant and destructive force trampling on everything in [her] path". Courtney served as Danny B's 'wingman' and ultimately, it was primarily her counseling which led him to engage in his first kiss (and relationship) with Lacey. However, Lacey is jealous of Courtney's relationship with Danny and has threatened her if she doesn't end their friendship. Throughout the year, Courtney records a webshow called "Fan Mail, Schman Mail" where she answers letters from fans of the show. She is shown to be a fan of Cirque du Soleil; she has multiple posters on the wall by her bed.
- Anne Lane as Abigail "Abby" Brown, a painfully shy, silent girl from a very conservative background who shares a room with Steph. She is always shown wearing a modest dress and is usually hesitant to go along with Steph's antics. However, she does seems quite sad when Steph's hamster dies. She is engaged to a small business owner, Elijah Jefferson, under arrangement, and does not want to marry him, which she confirms in "Abby's Party." She finally meets Elijah in the episode "SpoOoOoky Adventure!!!". She seems to trust in (and could possibly have a crush on) Gopher in response to his obvious interest in her, going so far as to actually speak directly to him (and his parents) on at least two occasions. She has hinted that he's the only floormate who truly knows anything about her, despite Steph's constant reading of her diary. She barely speaks and if forced to respond she will write it down on a notepad to give to who she is "speaking" with. She gets very nervous and often runs away when the topics of love and sex come up. At the very end of the semester, Abigail gets a letter from home informing her that her dowry horse has died, which means she will not have to marry Elijah. When she tells Gopher about this, he is very happy that they may have a chance, and doesn't mind that Abby "kills" him in the Markers game.

=== Other cast ===
- Andy Gardner as Andy, a student who suddenly became popular after the floor finds out that he is gay. In the episode "The Screening", Andy reveals that he isn't actually gay and never admitted to it. His popularity has gone down due to the backlash of him being "hetero".
- Jamison Lingle as Jayme a.k.a. "Mystery Hot Girl", Daniel's secret crush and later "friend." He gets over his crush in "Traumatic Event" when he realizes that she is boring after being trapped in an elevator with her. We last see her in the episode "Frat Party" as someone Courtney suggests for Danny B to kiss. Danny B responds, "No, she's too boring". She is also a member of Marshall's a cappella group, Tone Def.
- Keye Chen as Paul Chen, a classmate of Shane, who thinks Paul is smart because he's Asian. He turns out to be just as much of a party animal as Shane.
- Phil Daddario as Phil, a pothead and the floor's drug dealer.
- Sidney Brown as Derrick Johnson, the star player of the college basketball team. He and Brit date for a time, until she broke it off just before he went to the basketball playoffs. He talked to Brit one last time in the episode "Tour de 5-South".
- Aadit Patel as Aadit, the floor's designate frat guy, a member of the fraternity that Mike intended to pledge in "The Smell." Aadit's popularity increases significantly when it is within his power to put people on the list for an upcoming party at his frat ("The List"), but is quickly neglected by everyone afterwards.
- Valentina Garcia as Lacey, Danny B's clingy, 20-year-old girlfriend. They meet in the episode "The Frat Party", and break up in the episode "Floor Dinner". However in a subsequent episode ("Dormal"), Lacey comes uninvited to the crew's dorm formal. She agrees to leave with a promise from Danny B. that he will talk to her. The hinting towards her psychotic break-down came to fruition when she sprays Daniel with mace before his history final.
- Negin Singh as Yassi, R.A. of 5 North and Marshall's nemesis. Marshall chicken necks her while playing flag football in the episode "IM football" and tells Dean Tomlinson that she is on drugs, in the episode "Dormal," in order to beat her out for the prize of R.A. of the year.
- Allen Loeb as Dean Tomlinson, the dorm's residential director. He is known to be soft-spoken and caring, but actually hates his job (so much that he gives it to Marshall for next school year).
- Gracie Lane as Emily, Mike's high school girlfriend. Emily is frequently depicted as a clingy, spoiled and selfish girly-girl who often fights with Mike on the phone whenever she overhears his friends mention girls. When she visits the college in "Recon Mission", she is quickly established as only worrying about trivial drama among her peers. In "Come (Out) Today", she frequently whines, complains and even tries to make out with Mike when he tries to take her out to see Josh's play. Mike breaks up with her over Thanksgiving break, as revealed in the episode "Turkey Drop", but he hooks up with her over winter break, which he admits in the episode "The Frat Party." It is revealed when she shows up on Marshall's tour of the floor ("Tour de 5-South") that Emily may intend to attend the school next year.

== Awards ==
=== Webby Awards ===
- 2009: Comedy: Long Form or Series, Official Honoree
- 2008: Individual Short or Episode, Official Honoree
- 2008: Best Writing, Official Honoree

=== Streamy Awards ===
- 2009: Audience Choice Award, Nominated
- 2009: Best Ensemble Cast in a Web Series, Nominated

=== W3 Awards ===
- 2009: Comedy - Extended or Series, Gold Award Winner
- 2009: Entertainment, Gold Award Winner

== Episodes ==
=== Season 1 ===
| Episode # | Episode Name | Description |
|---|---|---|
| 101 | "Roommates" | In the series premiere, the floor mates fill out their roommate contracts and prepare for the first social event...a pita party. |
| 102 | "Game Night" | The floor mates play a revealing game of ten fingers as some rush to experience Greek Life. |
| 103 | The Smell | Everyone is distracted by a mysterious odor on the floor during fraternity/sorority bid week. |
| 104 | Campaign | Marshall holds an election for floor government, preceded by uncanny campaigning. |
| 105 | Pranks | When Mike's younger brother comes to visit, the floor gets wrapped up in a prank war. |
| 106 | I.M. Football | GThe floor unites to compete in an Intramural flag football game against another floor. |
| 107 | The Date Party | Brit and Court bring two male floor mates to a sorority function as Marshall is called in by the Resident Director to discuss his violent actions in the previous episode. |
| 108 | "Halloween" | Brit and Court leave for a party dressed scandalously, while Steph gathers the rest of the floor for a Halloween program she planned. |
| 109 | The Talent Show | It's the floor talent show, hosted by Shane and Gopher...scripted by Steph. |
| 110 | All Nighters | Midterms week arrives and the floor is forced to buckle down and study. |
| 111 | (T)issues | The floor is struck with a rampantly contagious flu virus. |
| 112 | Alarmed | The triple develops a brilliant plan to pull the fire alarm in order to uncover the identity of Danny B's "Mystery Hot Girl." |
| 113 | Recon Mission | With the help of Phil, Shane and Gopher rig an elaborate scheme to find out where Danny B's "Mystery Hot Girl" lives. |
| 114 | Come (Out) Today | Andy, a low-profile floor resident, comes out as gay and suddenly he is the most popular guy on the floor. Josh, simultaneously, premieres his self-discovery themed play. |
| 115 | Turkey Drop | The floor residents return from Thanksgiving break with some new developments. |
| 116 | Teamwork | The floor participates in a team-building activity led by the Resident Director. |
| 117 | Marshall's New Hat | Marshall's accomplished and cool twin brother William shows up for a visit. |
| 118 | Group Shot | The floor is left without supervision when a post-breakdown Marshall checks himself into a spa. |
| 119 | He's Back | The floor prepares for finals week - and potential new relationships. |
| 120 | Finals | It's the week before Christmas and love is in the air. |

=== Season 2 ===
| Episode # | Episode Name | Description |
|---|---|---|
| 201 | "Welcome Back" | All the floormates return after winter break for a traditional run through campus while only in underwear, a Button Bonanza, and a shocking revelation about two of the floormates. |
| 202 | The Screening | A screening of first semester footages leads to tense moments, culminating with Mike confronting Brittany. |
| 203 | Markers | Mike introduces the game of Markers to the floor, while Brit introduces the floor to her boyfriend Derrick. |
| 204 | Selling Out | President Shane holds court over a tense floor government meeting, in which the floor T-Shirt is voted upon and Shane's motives are questioned. |
| 205 | A Capella | Marshall's a cappella group visits the floor, and his relationship with Steph is scrutinized. |
| 206 | Valentine's Day | Love is in the air, and the boys are scrambling to make this Valentine's Day count. |
| 207 | Traumatic Event | Daniel runs into Jayme in the elevator; meanwhile, the floor bonds...without Mike. |
| 208 | The Camp Out | It's basketball season and the floor is camping out for tickets. Can Shane finish his paper in the midst of all this school spirit? |
| 209 | Parents' Weekend | Everyone's parents arrive on the floor...well, maybe not everyone's. |
| 210 | The List | People are scrambling to get on Aadit's good side in order to get on the list for his frat's upcoming party. |
| 211 | The Frat Party | The frat party is here, and it might be time for Daniel to finally get his first kiss. Meanwhile, Mike is feeling more and more isolated. |
| 212 | March Madness | The floor gathers in the triple to watch the Tournament game, but someone quickly becomes un-welcome. |
| 213 | Spring Break #1 | It's Spring Break, and the boys hit the road in search of the World's Largest Gopher. Meanwhile, Marshall takes Steph to Jamaican Me Spacey (a Jamaica-themed space camp), fulfilling her childhood dream. |
| 214 | Spring Break #2 | It's Spring Break, and the boys hit the road in search of the World's Largest Gopher. Meanwhile, Marshall takes Steph to Jamaican Me Spacey (a Jamaica-themed space camp), fulfilling her childhood dream. |
| 215 | Spring Break #3 | It's Spring Break, and the boys hit the road in search of the World's Largest Gopher. Meanwhile, Marshall takes Steph to Jamaican Me Spacey (a Jamaica-themed space camp), fulfilling her childhood dream. |
| 216 | Spring Break #4 | It's Spring Break, and the boys hit the road in search of the World's Largest Gopher. Meanwhile, Marshall takes Steph to Jamaican Me Spacey (a Jamaica-themed space camp), fulfilling her childhood dream. |
| 217 | Spring Break #5 | It's Spring Break, and the boys hit the road in search of the World's Largest Gopher. Meanwhile, Marshall takes Steph to Jamaican Me Spacey (a Jamaica-themed space camp), fulfilling her childhood dream. |
| 218 | Tour de 5-South | Marshall leads a tour of newly accepted freshman through the floor, while Brit sees Derrick one last time. |
| 219 | Marshall's New Plan | Marshall's twin brother William returns to the floor! |
| 220 | Abby's Party | The girls throw a bachelorette party for Abby, while the boys battle on the floor. It's all fun and games... |
| 221 | Blood, Sweat, and Tears | Courtney hosts a blood drive on the floor, which features the premiere of Josh’s new documentary. |
| 222 | SpoOoOoky Adventure!!! | Mike and Brit lead the floor in pursuit of answers to a campus mystery while a guest arrives for Abby. |
| 223 | Floor Dinner | As the year winds down, 5-South gathers for a floor dinner; however, the meal is infiltrated by a few outsiders. |
| 224 | Quiz Bowl | Daniel leads a rag-tag 5 South team in a trivia competition against 5 North. |
| 225 | Dormal (Finale Part 1) | 5 South heads to Dormal, and RA of the year is announced. |
| 226 | Moving Out (Finale Part 2) | It's the last day on the floor, meaning that it's the last chance for Gopher to talk to Abby, for Lacey to talk to Daniel, and for Shane to pass his finals. |
