= Honeyjoon =

2025 drama film

- Film poster
- Directed by: Lilian T. Mehrel
- Written by: Lilian T. Mehrel
- Produced by: Lilian T. Mehrel; Andreia Nunes
- Starring: Ayden Mayeri; Amira Casar; José Condessa
- Cinematography: Inés Gowland
- Edited by: Harry Cepka
- Music by: Retail Space
- Production companies: Wonder Maria Filmes; Bärli Films
- Distributed by: Utopia
- Release dates: June 7, 2025 (Tribeca); June 10, 2026 (United States)
- Running time: 80 minutes
- Countries: United States; Portugal
- Language: English

Honeyjoon is a 2025 award-winning dark comedy film written, directed, and produced by Lilian T. Mehrel, in her directorial debut. It stars Ayden Mayeri, Amira Casar and José Condessa. It won the biggest film production prize in the world for $1million at Tribeca with the AT&T Untold Stories Award. It premiered at the Tribeca Festival on June 7, 2025. It was released theatrically in North America by Utopia's Circle Collective, opening June 2026. It will have U.S. theatrical expansion in early 2027 with the Fithian Group's Attend.

== Premise ==
The film is a dark comedy with emotional depth and stunning cinema. It follows June and her Persian-British mother Lela, who travel to the Azores islands for a grief anniversary, each coping in different ways. A hot philosophical surfer takes them on a tour as we surf the waves of life, loss, flirting... an unforgettable ride.

== Cast ==
- Ayden Mayeri as June
- Amira Casar as Lela
- José Condessa as João
- António Maria as Antonio
- Tiago Sarmento as Filipe
- Teresa Faria as Grandma

== Production ==
Honeyjoon is the winner of the Tribeca AT&T Untold Stories Award, for $1 million. It premiered at the Tribeca Festival and 50 festivals since, winning over 25 audience and jury awards.

It was developed at the TorinoFilmLab, ComedyLab and CineQuaNonLab, and won the SFFILM Rainin Grant.

In November 2024, Ayden Mayeri, Amira Casar and José Condessa joined the cast. Principal photography began November 2024.

== Release ==
The film had its world premiere at the Tribeca Festival on June 7, 2025.

It was released theatrically in North America by Utopia's Circle Collective, opening June 2026 in NYC at the IFC Center.

After its indie theatrical success, with a remarkable audience response, it will get a U.S. theatrical expansion in early 2027 with the Fithian Group's Attend.
