= Mr. Throwback =

American television series

- Genre: Comedy
- Created by: Daniel Libman; David Caspe; Matthew Libman; Adam Pally
- Starring: Adam Pally; Stephen Curry; Ego Nwodim; Ayden Mayeri
- Composer: Joshua Moshier
- Country of origin: United States
- Original language: English
- No. of seasons: 1
- No. of episodes: 6

Production
- Executive producers: David Caspe; Matthew Libman; Daniel Libman; Adam Pally; Stephen Curry; Erick Peyton; David Wain
- Running time: 25–32 minutes
- Production companies: Unanimous Media; Bro Bro; Shark vs. Bear; Universal Television

Original release
- Network: Peacock
- Release: August 8, 2024

Mr. Throwback is an American comedy television series that premiered on Peacock on August 8, 2024. It stars Adam Pally as former teenage basketball phenom Danny Grossman. In order to pay back a debt, he ingratiates himself with NBA basketball player Stephen Curry, who plays himself. Ego Nwodim and Ayden Mayeri also star. In April 2025, the series was canceled after one season.

== Cast and characters ==
=== Main ===
- Adam Pally as Danny Grossman
- Stephen Curry as himself
- Ego Nwodim as Kimberly Gregg
- Ayden Mayeri as Samantha Judlow

=== Recurring ===
- Tracy Letts as Mitch Grossman
- Layla Scalisi as Charlie Grossman
- Tien Tran as Lucy
- Rich Sommer as Dr. Josh

== Episodes ==
| No. | Title | Directed by | Written by | Original release date |
|---|---|---|---|---|
| 1 | "Why Not Me" | David Wain | Story by : Daniel Libman & David Caspe & Matthew Libman & Adam Pally; Teleplay by : Daniel Libman & David Caspe & Matthew Libman | August 8, 2024 |
| 2 | "Charlie World" | David Wain | Gail Lerner | August 8, 2024 |
| 3 | "The Slump" | David Wain | Phil Augusta Jackson | August 8, 2024 |
| 4 | "The Only Way Out Is Through" | David Wain | Amina Munir | August 8, 2024 |
| 5 | "Bang Bang" | David Wain | Rickey Larke | August 8, 2024 |
| 6 | "Eric Roth Costs a Fortune, Bro" | David Wain | Ally Thibault & Jillian Dukes & Daniel Libman & Matthew Libman | August 8, 2024 |

== Release ==
Mr. Throwback was released on Peacock on August 8, 2024. It was later announced that the show would repeat on NBC on September 12, 2024.

== Reception ==
Review aggregator Rotten Tomatoes reported an approval rating of 82% based on 11 reviews, with an average rating of 6.4/10. The website's critics consensus reads, "Mr. Throwback gets considerable lift from a very game Steph Curry, making for a daffy mockumentary that scores with consistent three-pointers if not slam dunks." Metacritic gave the first season a weighted average score of 57 out of 100 based on 8 reviews, indicating "mixed or average reviews".

== See also ==
- The Fall and Rise of Reggie Dinkins, a 2026 TV series with a similar premise and format
