= Somebody I Used to Know =

2023 film by Dave Franco and Alison Brie

- Official release poster
- Directed by: Dave Franco
- Written by: Dave Franco; Alison Brie
- Produced by: Marty Bowen; Wyck Godfrey; Isaac Klausner; Ben Stillman; Michael Heimler; Leigh Kittay
- Starring: Alison Brie; Jay Ellis; Kiersey Clemons; Haley Joel Osment; Julie Hagerty; Olga Merediz
- Cinematography: Brian Lannin
- Edited by: Ernie Gilbert
- Music by: Danny Bensi; Saunder Jurriaans
- Production companies: Amazon Studios; Black Bear Pictures; Temple Hill Entertainment
- Distributed by: Amazon Prime Video
- Release date: February 10, 2023
- Running time: 106 minutes
- Country: United States
- Language: English

Somebody I Used to Know is a 2023 American romantic comedy film directed by Dave Franco and co-written with his wife Alison Brie. The film stars Brie, Jay Ellis, and Kiersey Clemons.

Workaholic showrunner Ally goes on a trip to her hometown to regroup after her series gets cancelled. Reminiscing with her ex Sean, she starts to question who she has become, which is amplified upon meeting his fianceé Cassidy.

It was released on Amazon Prime Video on February 10, 2023.

== Plot ==
Ally is the showrunner of Dessert Island, a once successful but waning reality TV series. After filming the season's final episode, she is informed that the show will be cancelled. With no social life outside of work, she decides to take a break and visit her mother in Leavenworth, Washington.

At a bar in her hometown, she runs into an ex-boyfriend, Sean. They spend the night drinking together, and kiss in the car when Sean takes her home. He refuses her invitation for sex, and she leaves awkwardly. Later that day, she visits Sean's house intending to apologize for the incident, but learns that he is getting married that weekend and his family is throwing a party. She tries to leave, but Sean's mother Jojo insists she attend the wedding to film it.

Ally learns that Sean's fiancée, Cassidy, is alienated from her parents. She feels suspicious about her, and gets her assistant, Kayla, to dig up information about Cassidy's family. Meanwhile, a streaming platform is interested to renew Dessert Island for another season and wants to meet with Ally.

Cassidy is uneasy about Ally's presence at wedding parties. She performs with her punk rock band at a bar, and later shares a table with Ally to talk about Sean. Cassidy tells Ally that she plans to stop touring with her band to settle down with Sean after marriage. Ally notices that she is unhappy about this.

Kayla finds information about Cassidy's parents, and Ally asks her to send them an anonymous invitation to the wedding. When Ally and Cassidy spend more time with each other, Ally realizes her impression of her was mistaken. They bond over common interests, even ending up streaking together on a golf course after smoking cannabis. Sean is distracted by their growing closeness.

On the eve of the wedding, Cassidy is surprised to see her parents. Ally does not confess to inviting them, leading Cassidy to blame Sean for it and call off the wedding. At their hotel, Ally tries to correct her mistake by getting Sean and Cassidy to understand each other better. Sean realizes he is suppressing Cassidy's career and apologizes. Meanwhile, Ally takes the blame for inviting Cassidy's parents, and Cassidy reneges on cancelling the wedding.

Ally leaves the event permanently and returns to her mother's house, where they have a heart-to-heart about being one's true self. Ally leaves for Los Angeles, but makes a pact to visit more often. Dessert Island is picked up for another season, but Ally passes showrunning duties on to Kayla. She chooses to focus on her interests, picking up another show instead, which centers around the topic of nudism.

In a mid-credits scene, a commercial for Dessert Island Season 4: The Dess-Hurt Locker in the style of The Hurt Locker is shown. Kayla is listed as the creator.

== Cast ==
- Alison Brie as Ally
- Jay Ellis as Sean
- Kiersey Clemons as Cassidy
- Danny Pudi as Benny
- Haley Joel Osment as Jeremy
- Ayden Mayeri as Kayla
- Amy Sedaris as Deedee
- Sam Richardson as Dar
- Zoë Chao as Ramona
- Kelvin Yu as Christian
- Evan Jonigkeit as Chef Jamie
- Julie Hagerty as Libby
- Olga Merediz as Joanne "Jojo"

== Production ==
In August 2021, it was announced that Alison Brie, Jay Ellis and Kiersey Clemons had joined the cast, with Dave Franco directing from a screenplay he wrote with Brie. Amazon Studios produced and distributed the film through Prime Video. In September 2021, Julie Hagerty, Haley Joel Osment, Amy Sedaris, Danny Pudi, Zoë Chao, Evan Jonigkeit, Olga Merediz, Ayden Mayeri and Kelvin Yu joined the cast. Franco said the film was inspired by romantic comedies of the 1980s and 1990s.

Principal photography began in and around Portland, Oregon in September 2021. In August 2022, Brie said that post-production had wrapped and the film was finished.

== Release ==
The film was released on February 10, 2023.

== Reception ==
On the review aggregator website Rotten Tomatoes, 70% of 89 critics' reviews are positive, with an average rating of 6.0/10. The website's consensus reads: "While it might have been more satisfying with a sharper focus, Somebody I Used to Know is a funny, uniquely nuanced rom-com with some interesting things to say." Metacritic, which uses a weighted average, assigned the film a score of 57 out of 100, based on 18 critics, indicating "mixed or average reviews".
