= Fletch Won =

1985 novel by Gregory Mcdonald

- First edition cover
- Author: Gregory Mcdonald
- Language: English
- Series: Fletch series
- Genre: Mystery, Comedy novel
- Publisher: Warner Books
- Publication date: 19 September 1985
- Publication place: United States
- Media type: Print (Hardback & Paperback)
- Pages: 265 pp
- ISBN: 0-446-51325-3
- OCLC: 12052967
- Followed by: Fletch, Too

Fletch Won is a mystery/comedy novel written by American Gregory Mcdonald and published in 1985.

It is the eighth book to star the character Fletch, but is a prequel set before the events of first seven books in the series. The title is a play on words, reflecting its canonical position in the timeline, with "won" being a homophone of the word "one". The novel follows the early days of the title character's journalism career. Irwin "Fletch" Fletcher is moved off of obituaries and wedding announcements at the News Tribune and is assigned his first journalistic interview, only to have the subject turn up dead in the newspaper's parking lot. He investigates, beginning his dual profession of journalist and investigator.

A film adaptation of the novel has been in development for some time with a number of different persons attached.

== Plot summary ==
Fletch is a junior reporter, only at the News-Tribune for a short time. Frank, his editor, is losing respect for this new employee. He moves Fletch to a different section of the newspaper more than once, but Fletch continues to cause trouble. When Fletch is to run the story of local lawyer Donald Habeck, who requests an interview in order to announce that he is giving $5 million to a local museum, the lawyer turns up dead in the News-Tribune parking lot.

Unsurprisingly, Frank takes Fletch off the story and gives it to an experienced reporter who has been with the newspaper for years. Fletch is charged with investigating a whorehouse—which he does. However, he is not about to give up on the Habeck story, the circumstances of which seem mighty suspicious, especially when Fletch starts to suspect that the legal firm Habeck worked for is one of the most crooked firms around.

== Characters ==
- I. M. Fletcher (Fletch) – protagonist
- Frank Jaffe – Fletch's boss, a newspaper editor
- Donald Habeck – a lawyer, killed in the newspaper's parking lot

== Reception ==
Patrick Taggart of the Austin American-Statesman opined that while the novel "reads more like a screenplay than a novel", those "interested in a bright, non-challenging read should find much to enjoy." Tom De Haven of The Philadelphia Inquirer wrote that while the suspense is "singularly lacking", the pacing is "awkward", and the prose is "too frequently coy", the novel is "definitely worth a read."

== Release details ==
- 1985, USA, Warner Books (ISBN 0-446-51325-3), 1985, hardback (First edition)
- 1985, USA, Gollancz (ISBN 0-575-03726-1), 1985, hardback
- 1988, USA, Outlet (ISBN 0-517-64797-4), April 1988, hardback
- 1989, USA, Warner Books (ISBN 0-446-34095-2), 31 December 1989, paperback
- 1993, USA, Thorndike Press (ISBN 0-89621-677-2), December 1993, hardback (Large Print edition)
- 2002, USA, Vintage Books (ISBN 0-375-71352-2), July 2002, paperback
