= Running Scared (1972 film) =

- Theatrical Release Poster
- Directed by: David Hemmings
- Written by: Clive Exton; David Hemmings (screenplay); Hugo Butler (adaptation)
- Based on: Running Scared by Gregory Mcdonald
- Produced by: Stanley O'Toole; Gareth Wigan
- Starring: Robert Powell; Gayle Hunnicutt
- Cinematography: Ernest Day
- Edited by: Ralph Sheldon
- Music by: Michael J. Lewis
- Color process: Technicolor
- Production company: Wigan-Hemmings-O'Toole
- Distributed by: Paramount British Pictures
- Release date: May 1972
- Running time: 98 minutes
- Country: United Kingdom
- Language: English

Running Scared is a 1972 British drama film directed and co-written by David Hemmings. This was Hemmings' only film as a writer, and his first time directing. It was based on the 1964 novel of the same name written by Gregory Mcdonald.

== Plot ==
Tom Betancourt (Robert Powell), a student at Cambridge University, leaves after having watched his best friend commit suicide by slashing his wrists. On principle, Tom refused to interfere, having discussed the matter with his friend, who had insisted that the suicide was his choice and that he did not wish it to be prevented.

Tom then visits his friend's parents under an assumed name, and falls in love with the dead boy's sister (Gayle Hunnicutt). A complicated affair ensues.

== Cast ==
- Robert Powell as Tom Betancourt
- Gayle Hunnicutt as Ellen Case
- Barry Morse as Mr. Case
- Stephanie Bidmead as Mrs. Case
- Edward Underdown as Mr. Betancourt
- Maxine Audley as Mrs. Betancourt
- Georgia Brown as Sarah
- Ben Howard as Charlie
- Paul Williamson as John
- John Bailey as Inspector
- John Franklyn-Robbins as Dean
- Terrence Hardiman as Doctor
- Bernard Kay as Mr. Willis
- Andy Bradford as Casey
- Joseph Greig as Porter

== Production ==
=== Filming ===
Gregory Mcdonald's original novel takes place between Harvard University and Long Island. The film switches the location from Cambridge, Massachusetts to Cambridge, England.

Filmed on location in Braunston, mainly around the canal and marina. Other filming took place in high street, Daventry, at Bilton Grange and at Oundle School in Northamptonshire. The film crew spent most of the summer of 1971 there and local people were asked to be extras. A film camera was positioned on top of the then disused windmill to film Robert Powell in the Austin-Healey sports car being driven through the village. The windmill was also used as the "base" for the crew.

=== Casting ===
Heather MacRae was originally cast as Ellen Case and began location filming until she was fired by Hemmings for being unable to perform, possibly for drug reasons. Although not ideally suited for the role, Gayle Hunnicutt was drafted in to take it on at short notice.

== Release ==
Running Scared opened at the Plaza Cinema, Lower Regent Street, London on 27 April 1972. It ran for two weeks before being withdrawn having taken only £2,302. It then got a circuit release as supporting feature to Play It Again, Sam, playing the ABC cinemas Brixton and Bayswater and the Classic cinema in Hampstead.

=== Loss ===
The film has screened on British television once, on BBC Two on 23 July 1978. As at 2020 it has never had a VHS or DVD release although it is understood that 16mm prints were struck.

Local interest in Running Scared is surprisingly strong. For an exhibition at the 2010 Braunston Festival photographs taken during filming, as well as press cuttings, original scripts and posters were displayed to the public. The original film was intended to be shown but unfortunately this was not the case at that time. Due to the interest shown, a larger exhibition and possible documentary (with input from local residents) was planned for the 40th anniversary of the making of the film in summer 2011.

In December 2011, the film was shown twice in Braunston Village Halls; lead actress Gayle Hunnicutt was present at the screening and claimed it was the first time she had seen the film in its entirety.

As of 2020 the copyright has yet to be determined.

=== Reception ===
Tom Milne, reviewing the film in The Times, commented that it "somehow fritters itself away into long, broody pauses and soulful searchings". Several sequences, on the other hand, were "done with a razor-sharp incisiveness that would not have shamed Losey and Pinter ... on balance, it seems worth risking the tedium to watch a born director at work".

The British periodical Films and Filming noted the influence of Michelangelo Antonioni and stated "the lifelike and somewhat enigmatic nature of the story is seemingly based on an assumption of intelligence in the audience which is far in advance of the UK film making norm" of the time. It rated Running Scared three stars for "not to be missed".
