= Michael Ritchie (filmmaker) =

American film director (1938–2001)

- Born: Michael Brunswick Ritchie; November 28, 1938; Waukesha, Wisconsin, U.S.
- Died: April 16, 2001 (aged 62); Manhattan, New York, U.S.
- Occupation: Film director
- Years active: 1955–2001
- Notable work: Downhill Racer; The Candidate; The Bad News Bears; Fletch; Fletch Lives; The Scout
- Spouse: Jimmie B. Ritchie
- Children: 5

Michael Brunswick Ritchie (November 28, 1938 – April 16, 2001) was an American film director, producer, and writer of films with comical or satirical leanings, such as The Candidate (1972) and Smile (1975). He scored commercial successes directing sports films like Downhill Racer (1969) and The Bad News Bears (1976), and comedies like Chevy Chase's Fletch (1985) and Eddie Murphy's The Golden Child (1986).

== Early life ==
Ritchie was born in Waukesha, Wisconsin, the son of Patricia (née Graney) and Benbow Ferguson Ritchie. His family later moved to Berkeley, California, where his father was a professor of experimental psychology at the University of California at Berkeley and his mother was the art and music librarian for the city. He attended Berkeley High School before becoming interested in film, and was accepted at Harvard University following high school.

== Career ==
While at Harvard, Ritchie directed the original production of the Arthur Kopit play, Oh Dad, Poor Dad, Mamma's Hung You in the Closet and I'm Feelin' So Sad in Cambridge, Massachusetts. This led Robert Saudek to offer him a job, and Ritchie worked on several TV series prior to his film debut in 1969 with Downhill Racer.

In 1970, Ritchie worked for John V. Tunney's senate election campaign, Tunney was the basis for Robert Redford's character in Ritchie's Oscar-winning film, The Candidate.

As a director, Ritchie's output was highly varied. Although originally known for his sports films and satires in the 1970s, such as The Candidate and The Bad News Bears, he became more known for his broad comedies in the 1980s, such as Fletch and The Golden Child.

Ritchie also briefly pursued a career as an author, writing Please Stand By: A Prehistory of Television, a nonfiction book about the experimental period of the television industry from the 1920s through the 1940s.

Additionally, projects of Ritchie's that were abandoned or otherwise realized by another director include The Hospital, The Parallax View, Breakout, an untitled Western, 25th Amendment, and a film about the 1994 ASU men's basketball point-shaving scandal.

== Personal life ==
In 1994, Ritchie purchased the hacienda-style house at 12305 Fifth Helena Drive, in the Brentwood district of Los Angeles, where Marilyn Monroe died in 1962. He bought the property for $995,000 and it became his Los Angeles family base. Also in 1994, Ritchie moved to Manhattan with his wife, Jimmie B. Ritchie, and daughters, Lillian (b. 1986) and Miriam (b. 1988). His additional children include a son, Steven (b. 1973), daughters Lauren (b. 1966) and Jessica (b. 1973), and two stepchildren, Nelly Bly and Billy Bly. His sister, Elsie Ritchie, acted in two of his films: The Candidate and Smile.

== Death and legacy ==
Ritchie died on April 16, 2001, from complications related to prostate cancer. Chris Willman of Entertainment Weekly wrote, "It’s difficult to think of any director, ever, who had a more consistently uneven career." According to Mark LeFanu, his films were recognized as "unpretentious, closely observed, finely textured works...there comes a point when, looking back, one sees that their consistency itself – consistent excellence – is telling us something: something about the way that cinema itself is able to move out and look around."

== Filmography ==
=== Film ===
Year	Title	Director	Producer	Story	Notes
1969	Downhill Racer	Yes	No	No	Directorial debut
1972	Prime Cut	Yes	No	No	
1972	The Candidate	Yes	No	No	
1975	Smile	Yes	Yes	No	
1976	The Bad News Bears	Yes	No	No	
1977	Semi-Tough	Yes	No	No	
1978	The Bad News Bears Go to Japan	No	Yes	No	
1979	An Almost Perfect Affair	Yes	No	Yes	
1980	The Island	Yes	No	No	
1980	Divine Madness	Yes	No	No	Concert film
1981	Student Bodies	No	Yes	No	Producer credit as "Allen Smithee"
1983	The Survivors	Yes	No	No	
1985	Fletch	Yes	No	No	
1986	Wildcats	Yes	No	No	
1986	The Golden Child	Yes	No	No	
1988	The Couch Trip	Yes	No	No	
1989	Fletch Lives	Yes	No	No	
1992	Diggstown	Yes	No	No	
1992	Innocent Blood	No	No	No	Role as "Night Watchman"
1993	Cool Runnings	No	No	Yes	
1994	Cops & Robbersons	Yes	No	No	
1994	The Scout	Yes	No	No	
1997	A Simple Wish	Yes	No	No	
2000	The Fantasticks	Yes	Yes	No	Also music producer

=== Television ===
==== TV movies ====
Title	Year	Director	Story	Notes
The Theater of Tomorrow	1963	Yes	No	
The Sound of Anger	1968	Yes	No	
The Positively True Adventures of the Alleged Texas Cheerleader-Murdering Mom	1993	Yes	No	Voice role as "Minister"
Comfort, Texas	1997	Yes	No	
Big Shot: Confessions of a Campus Bookie	2002	No	Yes	

==== TV series directed ====
Title	Year	Notes
Omnibus	1955	Segment "The Trial of St. Joan"
Profiles in Courage	1965	2 episodes, also associate producer
Dr. Kildare	1965	3 episodes
The Big Valley	1966	3 episodes
The Man from U.N.C.L.E.	1966	Episode "The Nowhere Affair"
Felony Squad	1966	3 episodes
Run for Your Life	1966-67	11 episodes
Bob Hope Presents the Chrysler Theatre	1967	Episode "To Sleep, Perchance to Scream"
The Outsider	1967-68	2 episodes
Harold Robbins' The Survivors	1969	2 episodes
L'encyclopédie audio-visuelle	1993	Documentary series, episode "Albert Einstein"
Beggars and Choosers	1999	2 episodes
