= Nora Kirkpatrick =

American actress, director, writer and musician (born 1984)

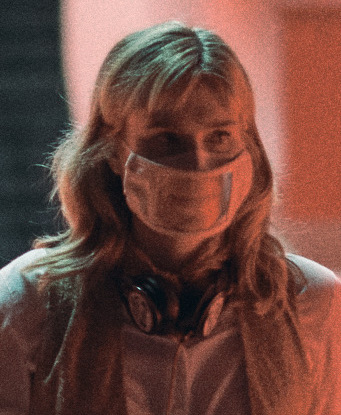
- Kirkpatrick on set in 2020
- Born: December 6, 1984 (age 41); Peru, Illinois
- Education: UCLA (BA)
- Occupations: Writer; directors; musician
- Years active: 2005–present
- Spouse: Bryn Mooser (m. 2016; div. 2022)
- Musical career
- Genre: Indie folk
- Instruments: Accordion; keyboards; vocals
- Years active: 2007–2014
- Formerly of: Edward Sharpe & The Magnetic Zeros

Nora Kirkpatrick (born December 6, 1984) is an American actress, director, writer and musician. Known for her roles as Katherine on the ABC Family TV series Greek, or for her recurring role as Esther Bruegger on the ninth season of The Office, Kirkpatrick has directed and written over 20 episodes for shows such as The Coop, The Goldbergs, and Daisy Jones & The Six.

== Early life ==
Kirkpatrick grew up in rural Iowa. She graduated from La Quinta High School. She graduated with a BA in theater from UCLA School of Theater, Film and Television.

== Career ==
Kirkpatrick was a founding member and accordion player for the Grammy Award winning and platinum record selling band Edward Sharpe and the Magnetic Zeros. After seven years touring on the road, she turned her focus to writing and directing, selling series to CBS, Hulu, and Comedy Central among others.

In 2020, Kirkpatrick became a writer on two Amazon series: Daisy Jones & the Six, produced by Reese Witherspoon, and Rodeo Queens starring Dakota Johnson. In 2019, Nora created, wrote and directed a 15- episode interactive television show for EKO and FunnyOrDie. This series, The Coop, co-starred Tony Hale, Bobby Moynihan, Bridget Everett and Margaret Cho. She directed episode #712 of The Goldbergs for ABC and was the first woman ever to direct a campaign for Bud Light. Nora helmed three commercials for the brand, shot during the COVID-19 pandemic in 2020.

In 2018, Nora created, wrote and directed Door No. 1, a live-action VR comedy series, starring Snoop Dogg and Ravi Patel, for Hulu. In a 2017 Forbes article, Kirkpatrick mentions virtual reality's ability to cause "spatial un-comfortability," and her aim to make the viewer the lead character of the story. In 2017, Nora sold her TV show Assisted Living to CBS, which was executive produced by Will Ferrell and Jessica Elbaum.

In 2016, Nora co-wrote and directed a five-part VR comedy series, Virtually Mike and Nora, with SNL alum Mike O'Brien, which is currently airing on Hulu. That same year, Nora sold her TV show, Best Seller, to Comedy Central. It was produced by Gloria Sanchez Productions and Olivia Wilde and co-written by SNL alum Dennis McNicholas.

Her short films have played at film festivals all over the world, garnering awards including Best Female Director at the Prague International Film Festival (2020) and the Grand Jury Prize at the San Diego Film Festival, Sioux City Film Festival, and the Femme Filmmakers Festival. She won a Davey Grant for her screenplay Long Time Listener, First Time Caller, and the Best Screenplay award from both Shore Scripts and Hollyshorts for Best Seller.

As an actor, she is probably best known for her role as Katherine, the stern president of Panhellenic, on the ABC Family TV series Greek, or for her recurring role on the ninth season of The Office as Esther Bruegger, a neighboring farmer's daughter who becomes Dwight's girlfriend. Kirkpatrick starred in the 2015 film Pink Grapefruit, which won the SXSW Grand Jury Award. She has played many other roles in film and TV, including Men at Work, Jennifer Falls, Don't Trust the B— in Apartment 23, and Chasing Life. She was one of the leads of the popular mockumentary web series Dorm Life, in which she played Courtney Cloverlock.

=== Music ===
Kirkpatrick played the accordion in the band Edward Sharpe and the Magnetic Zeros. She is a founding member and together they won a Grammy in 2013. She left the band after seven years in 2014 to focus on her directing career.

== Personal life ==
Kirkpatrick was married to filmmaker Bryn Mooser from 2016 to 2022.

== Filmography ==
=== Directing & Writing ===
Year	Title	Role	Notes
2016	Virtually Mike and Nora (Hulu)	Co-Director/Co-Creator	5 episodes
2018	Door No. 1 (Hulu)	Director/Co-Writer	"Ten Year" (season 1: episode 1)
2018	Best Seller (Comedy Central)	Director/Creator/Writer	"Pilot"
2019	Long Time Listener, First Time Caller	Director/Writer	Film
2019	The Coop	Director/Creator/Co-Writer	15 episodes
2020	Bud Light Seltzer Campaign	Director	"Memories" "Celebration" "Resemblance"
2020	The Goldbergs (ABC)	Director	"Game Night" (season 7: episode 12)
2023	Daisy Jones & the Six (Prime Video)	Writer	Track 3: Someone Saved My Life Tonight (co-written with Will Graham) (episode 3)
2025	Couples Weekend	Writer & Director	Film
2025	The Runarounds (Prime Video)	Writer	Bern Caught Stealing (season 1: episode 6)
TBA	Whodunnit	Writer & Director	Film

=== Acting ===
==== Film ====
Year	Title	Role	Notes
2005	What's Bugging Seth	Nora Green	
2005	White Nights	Sharon	
2007	Katrina	Tyler	TV film
2007	Crashing	Barton's Girlfriend	
2007	Randal	June	Short film
2008	Man Stroke Woman	Various	TV film
2009	Flower Girl	Wendy	
2010	Long Story Short	Georgia	Short film
2010	Growth	Kristin Daniels	
2010	How to Make Love to a Woman	Carla	
2011	Dreamworld	Jules	
2011	Happy Place	Margaret	Short film
2011	Mime Apples	Mime	Short film
2012	Peter at the End	Lucy	Short film
2013	Big Sur	Alyson	
2013	Sexy Evil Genius	Abby	
2013	All Together Now	Kylie	
2013	Bayou Tales	Diana	
2014	Crying Man	Brooke	
2015	Pink Grapefruit	Lead	
2015	Los	Dr. Ryan	
2016	The Babymoon	Shanon	
2016	Sandy Wexler	Sienna	
2017	The Attempt	Molly	
2017	Woman Child	Kate Montgomery	

==== Television ====
Year	Title	Role	Notes
2007	John from Cincinnati	Hotel Bartender	Episodes: "His Visit: Day Four", "His Visit: Day Seven"
2008–2009	Dorm Life	Courtney Cloverlock	37 episodes
2009–2011	Greek	Katherine Parker	19 episodes
2010	CSI: Crime Scene Investigation	Jane Lewis	Episode: "Cold Blooded"
2011	Breaking In	Patty Boggs	Episode: "21.0 Jump Street"
2012–2013	Don't Trust the B— in Apartment 23	Chrissy	Episodes: "The Wedding", "Monday June..."
2012	Men at Work	Nora	Episode: "Milo Full of Grace"
2013	The Office	Esther Bruegger	Recurring role (season 9); 5 episodes
2014	Jennifer Falls	Stephanie	Series regular
2015	Chasing Life	Jaclyn	"Model Behavior" (season 1: episode 17) "First Person" (season 2: episode 11)
2016	Riders	Mary	"Love and Lust" (season 1: episode 1) "Life on Mars" (season 1: episode 2 ) "A Trip At A Wedding" (season 1: episode 3)
2018	Door No. 1	Stephanie	
2019	The Coop	Dr. Diane	
2024	Shrinking	Kellie	"The Last Thanksgiving" (season 2: episode 12)
