= Confess, Fletch (novel) =

Novel by Gregory Mcdonald

- First edition cover
- Author: Gregory Mcdonald
- Language: English
- Series: Fletch
- Genre: Mystery, Comedy Novel
- Publisher: Avon
- Publication date: 1976
- Publication place: United States
- Media type: Print (Paperback)
- ISBN: 978-1-5385-4193-7
- Preceded by: Fletch
- Followed by: Fletch's Fortune

Confess, Fletch is a 1976 mystery novel by Gregory Mcdonald, the sequel to Fletch. The novel introduces a popular character, Inspector Francis Xavier Flynn, a brilliant but eccentric police detective who serves as a foil for the title character, Fletch.

== Synopsis ==
Fletch goes to Boston in search of stolen paintings belonging to his fiancée's father, the Count de Grassi, who has been kidnapped and is presumed dead. Upon arrival in Boston, Fletch discovers a dead woman in his apartment and is accused of murdering her. To clear his name, Fletch must find the murderer and balance his quest for the stolen paintings.

In his quest for the paintings Fletch deals with a cast of characters including his soon to be mother-in-law, the Countess de Grassi, an art dealer named Horan, and Inspector Francis Xavier Flynn of the Boston Police Department. Flynn suspects Fletch, but is skeptical enough of his innocence that Fletch is allowed to roam Boston with a police tail.

Ultimately, Fletch clears his name of the murder and gets away with the paintings safe in the hands of the Count de Grassi. The murder was done by Horan to frame Fletch who had inquired about the paintings before coming to America.

== Reception ==
The book won the 1977 Edgar Allan Poe Award for Best Paperback Original. In a review for the book, the New Castle News said it was "a freight train of suspense, winding through enough bends, some more seat-grabbing than others, to keep the reader's hands glued to the pages." In 1976, writer Joe Gores hailed the book as having "a beautifully complex plot which leaves you squirming at the final sentence, and a set of slippery characters who never turn out to be just exactly what they seem."

Writing for The New York Times, Newgate Callendar wrote that the character "Flynn stole the show". Flynn would go on to star in four of his own spin-off novels: Flynn (1977), The Buck Passes Flynn (1981), Flynn's In (1984), and Flynn's World (2003).

== Film adaptation ==
A film adaptation of the novel, starring Jon Hamm and directed by Greg Mottola, was released in September 2022.
