= Before You Know It (2019 film) =

2019 American drama film

- Theatrical release poster
- Directed by: Hannah Pearl Utt
- Written by: Hannah Pearl Utt; Jen Tullock
- Produced by: James Brown; Josh Hetzler; Mallory Schwartz
- Starring: Hannah Pearl Utt; Jen Tullock; Judith Light; Mike Colter; Mandy Patinkin; Alec Baldwin
- Cinematography: Jon Keng
- Music by: Ryan Tullock
- Production companies: Ball & Chain Productions; El Dorado Pictures; Feracious Pictures; Lifeboat Entertainment
- Distributed by: 1091 Media
- Release dates: January 27, 2019 (Sundance); August 30, 2019 (United States)
- Running time: 98 minutes
- Country: United States
- Language: English
- Box office: $151,459

Before You Know It is a 2019 American comedy film directed by Hannah Pearl Utt. It was co-written by, and stars, Utt and Jen Tullock. Judith Light, Mike Colter, Mandy Patinkin, and Alec Baldwin appear in supporting roles. It was screened in the U.S. Dramatic Competition section at the 2019 Sundance Film Festival.

== Plot ==
The film centres on a dysfunctional and codependent family who are struggling to maintain the family business, a small community theatre in New York City, where father Mel performs – in plays he has written – to an ever dwindling audience. Mel's eldest daughter, Jackie, is a quirky actress stuck in perennial adolescence despite being mother to teenage daughter Dodge. Mel's younger daughter, Rachel, is a business-minded lesbian whose attempts to be the responsible member of the family have made her something of a control freak.

Mel self-sabotages a playwright fellowship, complete with a major premiere of his latest play, that Rachel has lined up for him. Her angry outburst is followed minutes later by him having a fatal heart attack, which leads to the discovery that he had lied to her and Jackie for much of their lives about the identity and death of their mother; their real mother is in fact soap opera actress Sherrell, who has been left ownership of the theatre and the family home in Mel's will.

== Cast ==
- Hannah Pearl Utt as Rachel Gurner
- Jen Tullock as Jackie Gurner
- Judith Light as Sherrell
- Mike Colter as Charles
- Mandy Patinkin as Mel Gurner
- Alec Baldwin as Peter
- Oona Yaffe as Dodge Gurner
- Arica Himmel as Olivia
- Peter Jacobson as Michael the producer
- Frank Deal as Bill the director
- Blake Berris as Brandt Wilfred
- Tim Daly as Ronnie
- Mason Alexander Park and Jojo Brown as Montgomery Theatre Fellows

== Reception ==
Before You Know It holds an 83% approval rating on review aggregator website Rotten Tomatoes based on 42 reviews, with an average score of 6.7/10. The site's critical consensus reads, "Before You Know It wrings an entertaining dramedy out of one family's fraught dynamic thanks to wise, witty writing and sharp work from a talented ensemble."

Beandrea July of The Hollywood Reporter writes, “A strong debut that pushes the boundaries of what movies made from the female gaze can mean to audiences of all kinds...engrossing and entertaining." Nick Allen of RogerEbert.com writes, “A refreshing comedy...not afraid to be silly or tender."
