= Fletch Lives =

1989 film by Michael Ritchie

- Theatrical release poster, parodying that of Gone with the Wind
- Directed by: Michael Ritchie
- Written by: Leon Capetanos
- Based on: Characters by Gregory Mcdonald
- Produced by: Peter Douglas; Alan Greisman
- Starring: Chevy Chase; Hal Holbrook; Julianne Phillips; R. Lee Ermey; Richard Libertini; Cleavon Little
- Cinematography: John McPherson
- Edited by: Richard A. Harris
- Music by: Harold Faltermeyer
- Distributed by: Universal Pictures
- Release date: March 17, 1989
- Running time: 95 minutes
- Country: United States
- Language: English
- Budget: $8 million
- Box office: $39.5 million

Fletch Lives is a 1989 American comedy mystery film starring Chevy Chase and the sequel to Fletch (1985), directed by Michael Ritchie from a screenplay by Leon Capetanos, and based on the character created by Gregory Mcdonald.

== Plot ==
Irwin "Fletch" Fletcher, a reporter in Los Angeles for the Los Angeles Times, is contacted by the executor of his late aunt Belle's will, attorney Amanda Ray Ross. Ross informs Fletch he has inherited his aunt's 80-acre (32 ha) plantation, Belle Isle, in Thibodaux, Louisiana. Upon arriving, Fletch is disappointed to find the mansion terribly dilapidated, but he agrees to keep on its caretaker, Calculus Entropy. Fletch has dinner with Ross at her home, and she tells him of an anonymous $225,000 bid for Belle Isle.

Fletch awakens the next morning to find Ross dead. Fletch is charged with Ross's murder and taken into custody, nearly being raped by his cellmate Ben Dover, spared only because Dover is released on bail. Dover's lawyer Hamilton "Ham" Johnson manages to get Fletch released. When Fletch declines a second, even larger, offer of $250,000 for Belle Isle, this time presented by realtor Becky Culpepper, he starts getting harassed. First, a hired group of Ku Klux Klansmen harasses him. Then, an arsonist burns down the mansion. Finally, Ben Dover tries to kill Fletch during a raccoon hunt with some locals. Fletch discovers the land on Belle Isle is polluted by toxic waste. He determines to uncover the identity of the anonymous buyer, whom he suspects is attempting to intimidate him into selling.

He learns the local megachurch, Farnsworth Ministries, is interested in obtaining the Belle Isle property. Fletch investigates televangelist Jimmy Lee Farnsworth, and discovers Farnsworth's daughter is Becky. The toxic chemicals in the soil of Belle Isle are traced back to Bly Bio, a chemical waste facility in Mississippi. Fletch obtains an invoice from the plant's manager, which proves that Ham Johnson ordered the waste dumped on the Belle Isle land.

Fletch confronts Ham with the evidence at a costume party fundraiser hosted by Ham at his home. Ham admits he polluted Belle Isle out of revenge for the way he feels Farnsworth took advantage of Ham's mother shortly before she died. Farnsworth persuaded her in her confused mental state to give away her valuable land, on which the church then built a profitable amusement park. Ham intended to devalue the land owned by Farnsworth Ministries. He killed Ross when she realized his plan. Becky is captured by Dover and brought to Ham's mansion, and Ham orders Dover to kill Fletch and her. Fletch creates a distraction by spilling out the urn containing Ham's mother's ashes, and Becky and he escape. They flee to the Farnsworth Ministries church nearby, interrupting a televised service in progress. Ham follows them, intending to kill Fletch, but Ham is shot by Calculus. Afterwards, Calculus reveals himself to be FBI Special Agent Goldstein working undercover as part of an investigation of Farnsworth Ministries' financial dealings.

Returning to Los Angeles with Becky, Fletch is thrown a welcome home party by his co-workers and receives a $100,000 insurance claim check for the mansion fire. His ex-wife's alimony lawyer, Marvin Gillett, appears, offering to forego all future alimony payments in exchange for the Belle Isle property. Fletch happily signs over the polluted land.

== Cast ==
- Chevy Chase as Irwin "Fletch" Fletcher
- Hal Holbrook as Hamilton "Ham" Johnson
- Julianne Phillips as Becky Culpepper
- R. Lee Ermey as Jimmy Lee Farnsworth
- Richard Libertini as Frank Walker
- Randall "Tex" Cobb as Ben Dover
- Don Brockett as Sheriff Billy Joe Henry
- Cleavon Little as Calculus Entropy / FBI Special Agent Goldstein
- George Wyner as Marvin Gillet
- Patricia Kalember as Amanda Ray Ross
- Geoffrey Lewis as Ku Klux Klan Leader
- Richard Belzer as Phil
- Phil Hartman as Bly Bio Manager
- Titos Vandis as Uncle Kakakis
- Dennis Burkley as Joe Jack
- Noelle Beck as Betty Dilworth
- Jordan Lund as Deputy Sheriff
- Constance Shulman as Cindy Mae
- Ebbe Roe Smith as Jim Bob
- Marcella Lowery as Selma
- Michael P. Moran as Morgue Attendant
- Tom McCleister as Klansman #2

== Reception ==
On review aggregator Rotten Tomatoes, 38% of 32 critics' reviews are positive, with an average rating of 4.8/10. The website's critics consensus reads: "Chevy Chase remains ideally suited for the role, but Fletch Lives lacks its predecessor's wit, relying instead on silly disguises, cheap stereotypes, and largely unfunny gags." Metacritic, which uses a weighted average, assigned the film a score of 40 out of 100, based on 19 critics, indicating "mixed or average" reviews. Audiences polled by CinemaScore gave the film an average grade of "B" on an A+ to F scale.

Roger Ebert gave it 1.5 out of four stars, saying the film was assembled from underdeveloped tropes and cliches, and Chase's emotional detachment seemed as if he were "visiting the plot as a benevolent but indifferent outsider." Ebert said R. Lee Ermey's against type casting as televangelist Jimmy Lee Farnsworth was a highlight of the film, however. The Los Angeles Times wrote: "Some of the lines are funny, but after a while you just want to smack him."

=== Box office ===
The movie debuted at No. 1. It went on to gross $39.5 million worldwide.
