= Gregory Mcdonald =

American mystery writer (1937–2008)

- Born: Gregory Burke Christopher Mcdonald; February 15, 1937; Shrewsbury, Massachusetts, U.S.
- Died: September 7, 2008 (aged 71); Giles County, Tennessee, U.S.
- Occupation: Novelist
- Writing career
- Genres: Mystery, Comedy
- Notable works: Fletch (series); Flynn (series)
- Website: www.gregorymcdonald.com

Gregory Burke Christopher Mcdonald (February 15, 1937 – September 7, 2008) was an American novelist best known for his mystery adventures featuring investigative reporter Irwin Maurice "Fletch" Fletcher.

Two of the Fletch books earned Edgar Awards from the Mystery Writers of America: Fletch was named Best First Novel in 1975, and Confess, Fletch won for Best Paperback Original in 1977. This is the only time a novel and its sequel won back-to-back Edgars. Mcdonald went on to write seven more novels in the Fletch series, as well as spinoffs and other standalone novels. The Fletch character would appear in three feature films, two starring Chevy Chase released in 1985 and 1989, and one starring Jon Hamm released in 2022.

== Early life ==
Mcdonald was born in Shrewsbury, Massachusetts. His father was a CBS Radio News newsman. In 1958, Mcdonald got a bachelor's degree from Harvard University. Mcdonald had a sister.

== Career ==
Mcdonald ran a yacht troubleshooting business while attending Harvard. After graduating, he became a marine underwriter.

Later, while working as a high school teacher, he wrote and published his first novel, Running Scared (1964), a dramatic story of a college student's suicide. Being a published novelist helped him land a job as a journalist, which he was for seven years at the Boston Globe in the late 1960s.

His first mystery novel, Fletch, published in 1974, introduced Irwin Maurice "Fletch" Fletcher, an ex-Marine who becomes a wisecracking, womanizing California-based investigative reporter adept at undercover work. In the second Fletch novel, Confess, Fletch (1976), Mcdonald introduced his second signature protagonist, Inspector Francis Xavier Flynn, a brilliant but eccentric Boston Police homicide detective, who would go on to appear in four of his own spin-off novels. The Fletch series also spawned the Son of Fletch series, in which Mcdonald introduced the character of Jack Faoni, the illegitimate son of Irwin Maurice Fletcher. In addition, Mcdonald wrote two mysteries set in Tennessee in the Skylar series and a number of non-series (and non-mystery) novels.

Most of Mcdonald's mysteries mixed doses of humor and satire alongside the adventure and whodunit plots. Three of the later Fletch novels, Fletch and the Widow Bradley, Fletch Won and Fletch Too were prequels set in a period in which Fletch was still a struggling young journalist, before the events of McDonald's initial Fletch novel's plot.

== Adaptations ==
A 1972 British film co-written and directed by David Hemmings was adapted from Mcdonald's first novel, Running Scared.

In 1985, the first novel in the Fletch series was adapted into the movie Fletch with Chevy Chase playing the irreverent investigative reporter. Although Mcdonald had never seen Chevy Chase perform in anything substantial, he readily agreed to the casting of the actor in the role, and had nothing but praise for his performance. Chase would reprise his role in the 1989 sequel Fletch Lives (based on the Fletch character, but not adapted from any Mcdonald novel). There were no further Fletch films until the series was revived years after Mcdonald's death with Confess, Fletch (2022), based on the second novel in the series and starring Jon Hamm.

His 1991 neo-western novel The Brave was adapted into an unsuccessful 1997 film directed by and starring Johnny Depp.

Mcdonald made it clear to his family and heirs that he did not wish any other writers to continue his Fletch or Flynn series novels after his death. The family has honored those wishes, and no further novels based on Mcdonald's characters have since appeared.

== Personal life and death ==
In 1986, Mcdonald relocated to Pulaski, Tennessee, where he bought an antebellum cattle farm and became involved in local politics, specifically anti-Klan work. (Pulaski is the birthplace of the KKK.)

His first marriage, to Susan Aiken, ended in divorce. Christina Aiken (pen name I. M. Aiken) is one of Mcdonald's two children. He and Cheryle Higgins wed in 2001. Three stepsons resulted, and Mcdonald also had grandchildren.

He died at his home from prostate cancer in 2008.

== Bibliography ==
=== Fletch series ===
- Fletch (1974)
- Confess, Fletch (1976)
- Fletch's Fortune (1978)
- Fletch and the Widow Bradley (1981)
- Fletch's Moxie (1982)
- Fletch and the Man Who (1983)
- Carioca Fletch (1984)
- Fletch Won (1985)
- Fletch, Too (1986)

=== Son of Fletch series ===
- Son of Fletch (1993)
- Fletch Reflected (1994)

=== Flynn series ===
- Flynn (1977)
- The Buck Passes Flynn (1981)
- Flynn's In (1984)
- Flynn's World (1999 as e-book; 2003 on paper)

=== Skylar series ===
- Skylar (1995)
- Skylar in Yankeeland (1997)

=== Standalone novels ===
- Running Scared (1964)
- Love Among the Mashed Potatoes a.k.a. Dear M.E. (1978)
- Who Took Toby Rinaldi? (US title)/Snatched (UK title) (1980)
- Safekeeping (1985)
- A World Too Wide (1987)
- Exits and Entrances (1988)
- Merely Players (1988)
- The Brave (1991)
- Wise Saws (unpublished)

=== Non-fiction ===
- The Education of Gregory Mcdonald: Sketches from the Sixties. Writings About America, 1966–1973 (1985), republished as Souvenirs of a Blown World: Sketches from the Sixties: Writings About America, 1966–1973, Seven Stories Press, 2009; collection of his writings for the Boston Globe

=== Film adaptations ===
- Running Scared (1972) starring Robert Powell and Gayle Hunnicutt
- Fletch (1985) starring Chevy Chase
- Fletch Lives (1989) starring Chevy Chase (original screenplay by Leon Capetanos based on the Mcdonald character)
- The Brave (1997) starring Johnny Depp and Marlon Brando
- Confess, Fletch (2022) starring Jon Hamm
