= Couples Weekend =

2025 American comedy-drama film

- Theatrical release poster
- Directed by: Nora Kirkpatrick
- Written by: Nora Kirkpatrick
- Produced by: Lynette Howell Taylor; Samantha Housman
- Starring: Alexandra Daddario; Daveed Diggs; Josh Gad; Ashley Park
- Cinematography: Jeff Leeds Cohn
- Edited by: Henry Hayes
- Music by: Mitchell Yoshida
- Production companies: 51 Entertainment; Voltage Pictures
- Distributed by: Vertical
- Release dates: June 8, 2025 (Tribeca); May 8, 2026 (United States)
- Running time: 94 minutes
- Country: United States
- Language: English

Couples Weekend is a 2025 American comedy drama film, written and directed by Nora Kirkpatrick in her directorial debut. It stars Alexandra Daddario, Daveed Diggs, Josh Gad and Ashley Park.

It had its world premiere at the 2025 Tribeca Festival on June 8, 2025. The film was released on May 8, 2026 by Vertical.

== Plot ==
Two married couples, Debs/Josh and Mitch/Melanie, spend New Year's together in a snow cabin on a mountain. Debs is an author who has written one novel but works as an editor, while Josh is a nature photographer. Mitch is a financial manager who just received a promotion while Melanie is unemployed after writing two cookbooks. Debs and Mitch are also lifelong friends. On the morning of New Year's Eve, Debs and Mitch go for a hike up a mountain. When a tree nearly falls on them, they cut their hike short and walk back to the cabin. When they look through the window, they see Josh and Melanie having sex, which traumatizes them. Debs wants to confront them, but Mitch stops her, saying they need time to process it.

When Debs feels the heat is broken, she calls Gary, the owner of the house renting it to the couples, to come and fix it. As everyone tries to maintain composure, personal issues begin to be revealed: Debs is struggling with writer's block with her second novel, Mitch is unhappy with his job, and Josh hints he does not have a high opinion of Debs' first novel. Debs is struggling to stay silent, but Mitch does not want to do anything as he actually does not want to separate from Melanie. When Josh takes Melanie's photograph and his accomplishments for National Geographic are brought up, Debs calls them into question, leading to an argument about Josh's honesty. A guilty Melanie blurts out that she and Josh had sex, leading a traumatized Mitch to try and leave, but a snowstorm keeps them trapped. Everyone goes into separate rooms as Mitch tries to call a cab to go back to the city, but the snowstorm keeps that from happening.

Gary eventually arrives to fix the heater. An argument in the kitchen leads to all of the alcohol bottles breaking. The couples eventually agree to talk it out in separate rooms. Both Josh and Melanie state it was a spur of the moment fling that never happened before, but contradict each other on who initiated it. Melanie claims she did it because she felt like she had been a burden on Mitch for being unemployed. When Josh refuses to answer why, Debs admits she almost cheated on him with a musician she writes about as she felt a better connection with him.

As Mitch helps Gary fix the heater by removing a dead squirrel from it, he finds a bottle of unusual liquor, which Gary says belonged to the previous owners who were bootleggers and warns of side effects. When Mitch takes a drink, he enters a lucid state where he suggests to Debs that their long friendship would make them a good couple, but Debs turns him down. Josh and Melanie get into an argument over who initiated their encounter. Mitch calls his boss to tell him that he quits his job and he starts dancing in the living room by himself before Josh finds him. Mitch offers Josh the liquor. After taking a drink, he joins Mitch in the same lucid state. Melanie soon follows with a drink and after everyone is present as they reach midnight on New Year's, a reluctant Debs finally takes a drink.

After partying together, everyone admits their issues. Josh claims that he does not like himself. He also claims that Debs' first novel is not bad, but is not authentic to herself, to which Debs agrees. Debs has finished her second manuscript but is too scared to show anyone. Melanie admits to Mitch that she does not feel like they know each other very well. She also admits that someone else wrote her second cookbook. When Josh tells Mitch that he does not believe him about the fallen tree, the four of them go out to find it, which they do, before watching the sunrise together. In the aftermath, Debs and Josh decide to work things out while Mitch and Melanie decide to separate. Debs gives Mitch a copy of her new manuscript to read. Debs and Josh drive off together, Melanie leaves to go to her parents, and Mitch decides to stay at the cabin for a while.

== Cast ==
- Alexandra Daddario as Debs
- Daveed Diggs as Josh
- Josh Gad as Mitch
- Ashley Park as Melanie
- Kevin Pollak as Gary

== Production ==
In April 2025, it was announced Alexandra Daddario, Daveed Diggs, Josh Gad and Ashley Park had joined the cast of the film, with Nora Kirkpatrick directing from a screenplay she wrote.

== Release ==
It had its world premiere at the 2025 Tribeca Festival on June 8, 2025.

== Reception ==
On review aggregator Rotten Tomatoes, 55% of 22 critics gave the film a positive review, with an average rating of 6.0/10.
