= Cora Bora =

- Theatrical release poster
- Directed by: Hannah Pearl Utt
- Written by: Rhianon Jones
- Produced by: Mallory Schwartz; Jeffrey Soros; Simon Horsman
- Starring: Megan Stalter; Jojo T. Gibbs; Manny Jacinto; Ayden Mayeri; Thomas Mann; Chrissie Fit; Andre Hyland; Chelsea Peretti; Margaret Cho; Darrell Hammond
- Cinematography: Senda Bonnet
- Edited by: Kent Kincannon
- Music by: Miya Folick
- Production companies: Los Angeles Media Fund; Neon Heart Productions; Almanor Films
- Distributed by: Brainstorm Media
- Release dates: March 12, 2023 (SXSW); June 14, 2024
- Running time: 93 minutes
- Country: United States
- Language: English
- Box office: $33,991

Cora Bora is a 2023 American comedy-drama film, directed by Hannah Pearl Utt, from a screenplay by Rhianon Jones. It stars Megan Stalter, Jojo T. Gibbs, Manny Jacinto, Ayden Mayeri, Thomas Mann, Chrissie Fit, Andre Hyland, Chelsea Peretti, Margaret Cho and Darrell Hammond.

It had its world premiere at South by Southwest on March 12, 2023, and was released on June 14, 2024, by Brainstorm Media.

== Cast ==
- Megan Stalter as Cora
- Jojo T. Gibbs as Justine
- Manny Jacinto as Tom
- Ayden Mayeri as Riley
- Thomas Mann as Travis
- Chrissie Fit as Cristina
- Andre Hyland as Jeremiah
- Chelsea Peretti as Laurie
- Margaret Cho as Electra
- Darrell Hammond as Gary
- Heather Morris as Kaitlyn

== Production ==
In May 2022, it was announced Megan Stalter, Jojo T. Gibbs, Manny Jacinto, Ayden Mayeri, Thomas Mann, Chrissie Fit, Andre Hyland and Heather Morris joined the cast of the film, with Hannah Pearl Utt directing from a screenplay by Rhianon Jones.

== Release ==
The film had its world premiere at the 2023 South by Southwest Film & TV Festival on March 12, 2023. In October 2023, Brainstorm Media acquired distribution rights to the film. It was released on June 14, 2024.

== Reception ==
On the review aggregator website Rotten Tomatoes, 78% of 40 critics' reviews are positive, with an average rating of 6.7/10. The website's consensus reads: "A low-key comedy with an ample dose of pathos, Cora Bora can be as aimless as its heroine but gets considerable lift from Megan Stalter's stellar star turn."
