= Sébastien Aubert =

French entrepreneur and film producer

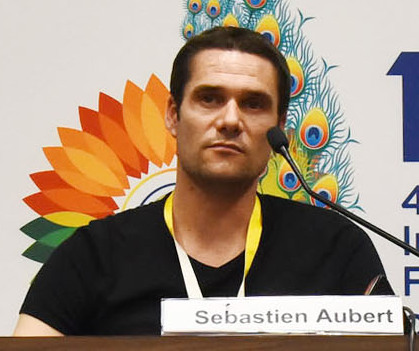
- Sébastien Aubert at the International Film Festival of India in 2017
- Born: 1983 (age 42–43); France
- Education: Emlyon Business School
- Occupations: Manager of Adastra Films; Film producer
- Notable work: Brides (film) (producer); LaRoy, Texas (film) (producer); In the Name of Blood (producer)

Sébastien Aubert is a French entrepreneur and film producer, known for producing the feature film LaRoy, Texas which won the Grand Prix at the 2023 Deauville American Film Festival.

He is the co-founder of the production company Adastra Films, along with David Guiraud.

== Biography ==
=== Education and Early Career ===
Sébastien Aubert graduated from EM Lyon Business School in 2007. During his studies, one of his professors, who worked in the film industry, inspired him to pursue the same path

In 2007, Sébastien Aubert completed a nine-month internship at the French Film Festival in Richmond, USA, with his friend David Guiraud. Following this experience, the two friends founded the production company Adastra Films in Cannes in 2008 to produce David Guiraud’s first short film, Le Tonneau des Danaïdes.

At the age of 25, Sébastien Aubert recalls that the three-week shoot in the Moroccan desert was very challenging. However, he admits that this experience inspired his decision to become a producer.

Le Tonneau des Danaïdes was a success, screened at nearly fifty festivals around the world, which helped the young company build a network. Sébastien Aubert then set aside his ambition to move to Paris to work in the film industry and decided to continue the Adastra Films adventure in Cannes.

=== From Short Films to Feature Films ===
In 2011, Sébastien Aubert produced The Strange Ones, a short film written and directed by Christopher Radcliff and Lauren Wolkstein. The shoot took place in the suburbs of New York. The film was selected for many festivals worldwide, including the Sundance Film Festival and the Clermont-Ferrand International Short Film Festival. According to Sébastien Aubert, it was Adastra Films' first short film to achieve such international success. The film was shortlisted for the 84th Academy Awards in 2012, but ultimately was not among the six final nominees. The short film was broadcast on France 2 during the Histoires Courtes program.

In 2014, Sébastien Aubert produced his first feature film, Brides, the debut film by Tinatin Kajrishvili. The film had its world premiere at the 64th Berlin International Film Festival in February 2014, where it won the third Audience Award. That same year, the film was also selected for the Tribeca Film Festival.

After producing their short films, Sébastien Aubert became the producer of Lauren Wolkstein and Christopher Radcliff’s first feature film, The Strange Ones. To finance the film, he turned to American investment funds and private investors, raising a budget of $725,000. In 2016, it was announced that Alex Pettyfer and James Freedson-Jackson would join the cast to play the two lead characters. The shoot took place in upstate New York over 20 days. The film was released in U.S. theaters in December 2017 and in France in July 2018, distributed by Épicentre Films. It received favorable reviews but had a limited release in only 40 theaters.

In 2015, at the Biarritz Film Festival, Sébastien Aubert was captivated by the short film Domingo by Raoul Lopez Echeverria and expressed his interest to the director in adapting it into a feature film. Four years later, in October 2019, filming took place in the favela of Guadalajara, where Raoul Lopez Echeverria is originally from. The film was selected for the 46th edition of the Toronto International Film Festival and won the Made in Jalisco award at the 36th edition of the Guadalajara International Film Festival in 2021.

In 2020, Heartbeast, the debut feature film by Aino Suni produced by Sébastien Aubert, was released. This psychological thriller, starring Elsi Sloan, Carmen Kassovitz, Adel Bencherif, and Camille, was almost entirely shot on the French Riviera. The original soundtrack was composed by JB Dunckel, with the lead track performed by Chilla.

=== To a Wider Audience ===
In September 2023, the film LaRoy, Texas, directed by Shane Atkinson and produced by Adastra Films, won the Grand Prix, the Audience Award, and the Critics’ Prize at the Deauville American Film Festival. Sébastien Aubert and the director met at the Clermont-Ferrand International Short Film Festival in 2013, where Shane Atkinson presented Penny Dreadful, a short film that caught Sébastien Aubert's attention LaRoy, Texas was released in French cinemas in April 2024 and achieved over 67,000 admissions in nine weeks.

At the end of 2023, the filming of In the Name of Blood (the debut feature film by French-Georgian director Akaki Popkhadze) took place in Nice. The film, produced by Adastra Films and starring Nicolas Duvauchelle, Denis Lavant, and Finnegan Oldfield, has a budget of 3 million euros.

There is always a risk in producing a director’s first film, but Akaki immediately had the spirit of a leader. He was both a demanding and attentive collaborator. I couldn’t be happier about his debut feature and I can’t wait to bring his upcoming project to the market (very soon).

— Sébastien Aubert, the American magazine Variety

The film had its world premiere at the San Sebastian International Film Festival in September 2024 and is set to be released in French cinemas on January 5, 2025.

== Filmography ==
=== Feature films ===
- 2014: Brides directed by Tinatin Kajrishvili
- 2017: The Strange Ones directed by Christopher Radcliff and Lauren Wolkstein
- 2020: Domingo directed by Raul Lopez Echeverria
- 2022: Heartbeast directed by Aino Suni
- 2024: LaRoy, Texas directed by Shane Atkinson
- 2025: In the Name of Blood directed by Akaki Popkhadze

=== Short films ===
- 2008: Le tonneau des Danaïdes directed by David Guiraud
- 2010: I am Agha directed by Muhammard Umar Saeed
- 2010: Jour 0 directed by Vincent Diderot
- 2011: Deux inconnus directed by Christopher Radcliff et Lauren Wolkstein
- 2011: Le nid directed by Tornike Bziava
- 2012: Black Mulberry directed by Gabriel Razmadze
- 2013: Social Butterfly directed by Lauren Wolkstein
- 2013: L'assistante directed by David Guiraud
- 2014: Jonathan's Chest directed by Christopher Radcliff
- 2015: Mine de rien directed by Grzegorz Jaroszuk
- 2015: H recherche F directed by Marina Moshkova
- 2016: Maxiplace directed by Vincent Diderot
- 2016: En proie directed by David Guiraud
- 2018: The Ambassador directed by Shane Atkinson
- 2022: Out of the Fog directed by Tigrane Minassian

== Awards ==
In 2012, Sébastien Aubert won one of the four European prizes at the European Awards for Entrepreneurship through the Erasmus program for young entrepreneurs of the European Union in Brussels.

In 2014, he received the France Télévisions Young Producer Award, awarded by a jury chaired by Emma de Caunes. In 2015, he was named among the future leaders of film production by Screen International magazine.

In 2015, Le Journal des Entreprises named him among 'The 100 Leaders Who Will Change France. In 2018, he was awarded the Gold Medal of the City of Cannes, presented by Mayor David Lisnard.

From 2020 to 2023, he was a laureate of the Choiseul 100 for the France Region Sud, a ranking by the Institut Choiseul that highlights the most promising leaders under 40 who are playing or are set to play a major role in the French economy.
