= List of Georgian films of 2014 =

Georgian film list

The Georgian film industry produced over ten feature films in 2014. This article fully lists all non-pornographic films, including short films, that had a release date in that year and which were at least partly made by Georgia. It does not include films first released in previous years that had release dates in 2014.

Also included is an overview of the major events in Georgian film, including film festivals and awards ceremonies, as well as lists of those films that have been particularly well received, both critically and financially.

== Major releases ==
Opening		Title	Cast and crew	Studio	Genre(s)	Ref.
J A N U A R Y	22	Lost in Karastan	Director: Ben Hopkins; Cast: Matthew Macfadyen, MyAnna Buring, Noah Taylor, Ali Cook	Brandstorm Entertainment AG	Comedy	
F E B R U A R Y	9	Brides	Director: Tinatin Kajrishvili; Cast: Mari Kitia, Giorgi Maskharashvili	ADASTRA Films	Drama	
F E B R U A R Y	20	Tbilisi, I Love You	Directors: Nika Agiashvili, Irakli Chkhikvadze, Levan Glonti, Alexander Kviria, Tako Shavgulidze, Kote Takaishvili, Levan Tutberidze	Storyman Pictures	Drama; Romance	
M A Y	20	The Search	Director: Michel Hazanavicius; Cast: Bérénice Bejo, Annette Bening	Warner Bros.	Drama	
J U L Y	9	Corn Island	Director: Giorgi Ovashvili; Cast: İlyas Salman		Drama	
A U G U S T	30	The President	Director: Mohsen Makhmalbaf; Cast: Misha Gomiashvili, Dachi Orvelashvili	Makhmalbaf Film House	Drama	

== Minor releases ==
Title	Director	Release date	Genre
Dzma	Thierry Grenade	10 December 2014 (France)	Drama
Great-Grandfather	Irakli Kochlamazashvili	22 November 2014 (Poland)	Drama
I'm Beso	Lasha Tskvitinidze	2014 (Georgia)	Adventure
Line of Credit	Salomé Alexi	5 September 2014 (Italy)	Drama
Taxi	Misha Mshvildadze	29 May 2014 (Georgia)	Comedy

== See also ==
- 2014 in film
- Cinema of Georgia
- List of Georgian submissions for the Academy Award for Best Foreign Language Film
