= Institut Choiseul for International Politics and Geoeconomics =

Research center based in Paris, France

- Predecessor: European Institute of Geoeconomics (1996)
- Headquarters: Paris, France
- President: Pascal Lorot
- Subsidiaries: Geoeconomics (in French, Géoéconomie)

Headquartered in the heart of Paris, France, Institut Choiseul for International Politics and Geoeconomics is an independent research center that analyzes international relations, economic and political strategies as well as international cultures.

== Theoretical background ==
The French think tank contributes to the massive body of international relations studies by examining the new balance of global power prevalent in the post–Cold War era from a geoeconomics perspective: a perspective which complements the traditional vision of the international order as primarily geopolitical. In this respect, the institute conforms to the thought of French philosopher, sociologist and political scientist Raymond Aron.

== Contribution to international relations ==
In 1997, then named the "European Institute of Geoeconomics", the Institute created an academic journal of the same name, entitled Geoeconomics (in French, Géoéconomie), that broadened the field of international relations in adding to the discourse a consideration for economics as a powerful force involved in shaping inter-state and political interactions. The research and activities of the institute equally seek to link the theoretical world with current events, and also seek to provide a European vision into the major geopolitical and economic issues. Pascal Lorot has been president of Institut Choiseul since 2003.

== Notable Laureates ==
Notable Laureates include:

Politicians:

- Emmanuel Macron, President of France
- Clément Beaune, Secretary of State for European Affairs
- Agnès Pannier-Runacher, Minister Delegate for Industry

Athletes:

- Tony Estanguet, triple Olympic champion in C1 slalom
- Tony Parker, basketball player

Entrepreneurs:

- Frédéric Mazella, founder of Blablacar
- Alexandre Prot, founder of Qonto
- Pierre-Yves Frouin, founder of BioSerenity
- Jean-Charles Samuelian-Werve, founder of Alan
- Sébastien Aubert, co-founder of Adastra Films
- Antoine Hubert, co-founder of Ÿnsect
- Gary Anssens, founder of Alltricks

Heirs:

- Yannick Bolloré
- Bris Rocher

== Publications ==
Institut Choiseul currently publishes five other academic journals, in addition to Géoéconomie:

- Maghreb-Machrek (Northern Africa and the Arab world)
- Problèmes d'Amérique latine (Problems of Latin America)
- Monde chinois (Sinophone world)
- Politique américaine (American politics)
- Nordiques (Nordic countries)
