= Megan Stevenson =

American actress

Megan Stevenson is an American actress. On television, she portrayed April Quinn in Get Shorty (2017–2019), and A.J. Gibbs in Review (2014–2017). She also appeared in the 2017 film Gary of the Pacific and in the debut film of Shane Atkinson, Laroy, Texas, portraying a femme fatale type of role.

== Filmography ==
Film work by Megan Stevenson
| Year | Title | Role | Notes |
|---|---|---|---|
| 2007 | Pop Rocks | Amanda | Short film |
| 2011 | Ricky and Ravi (Are in Between Jobs) | Megan | Short film |
| 2013 | Cavemen | Sara | |
| 2016 | The Bounce Back | Sarah Canton | |
| 2017 | Gary of the Pacific | Chloe | |
| 2018 | Silver Lake | Melanie | |
| 2023 | LaRoy, Texas | Stacy-Lynn | |

Television work by Megan Stevenson
| Year | Title | Role | Notes |
|---|---|---|---|
| 2007 | 30 Rock | Bikini Woman | 1 episode |
| 2010 | My Boys | Natasha | 1 episode |
| 2010 | $h*! My Dad Says | Amy | 1 episode |
| 2011 | Californication | Tabby | 1 episode |
| 2011 | Holly's Holiday | Brandi | TV movie |
| 2011 | Hart of Dixie | Gigi Godfrey | 1 episode |
| 2012 | Whitney | Jenn | 1 episode |
| 2012 | Bones | Tess Levinson | 1 episode |
| 2012 | Franklin & Bash | Megan Conray | 2 episodes |
| 2014 | Suburgatory | Leslie | 1 episode |
| 2014 | The Night Shift | Candy | 1 episode |
| 2014 | Jennifer Falls | Cherie | 1 episode |
| 2015 | Adventures in Love & Babysitting | Amber Montgomery | TV movie |
| 2015 | #TheAssignment | Megan | 2 episodes |
| 2016 | Typical Rick | Amy | 3 episodes |
| 2016 | Lethal Weapon | Bambi Mortenstern | 1 episode |
| 2014–2017 | Review | A.J. Gibbs | 22 episodes |
| 2019 | Liza on Demand | Courtney AKA Fit Woman | 1 episode |
| 2017–2019 | Get Shorty | April Quinn | 24 episodes |
