= Nobody Dies Here =

2016 French documentary short film

Nobody Dies Here (French: Ici, Personne Ne Meurt) is a 2016 French documentary short film directed by Simon Panay. The film has been presented as World Premiere to the 20th Rhode Island International Film Festival where it won the First Jury Prize for Best Documentary.

The film talks about an illegal Gold Mine in North Benin.

== Plot ==
Perma Gold Mine, Benin. Some dream to find something, others realized there was nothing to be found. Some dig relentlessly hoping to become rich, others died in the process. And a few of them say that here, nobody dies.

== Awards ==
- "First Jury Prize, Best Documentary", 20th Flickers' Rhode Island International Film Festival 2016
- "Best International Documentary", 33th Vues D'Afrique Montreal 2017
- "Special Jury Award", "Francophony Award", "Special Jury Mention, University Jury", 17th Un Poing C'est Court, Festival de Vaulx-en-Velin 2017
- "Jury Prize", Festival International du Film de Tanger 2016
- "Best International Documentary", "Audience Award", 16th Festival Lumières D'Afrique 2016
- "Best International Documentary", "Giura Ristretta Award", Medal of Honor of the Italian Parliament", 12th Sardinia Film Festival 2017
- "Best International Documentary", 14th In The Palace International Film Festival 2017
- "Jury Award", (Documentary Competition), 7th FINI, Festival Internacional de la Imagen 2017
- "Best Documentary", MAFICI, Festival Internacional de Cine de Puerto Madryn 2016
- "Special Jury Mention", 19th FICMEC, Festival de Cine Medioambiental de Canarias 2017
- "Best Documentary", 12th SoCal Film Festival 2017
- "Jury Prize" (Documentary Competition) 12th Baghdad International Film Festival 2016
- "Special Jury Mention", Festival du Film Documentaire de Saint-Louis du Sénégal 2016
- "Best Documentary", Wolves Independent International Film Festival 2016
- "Jury Prize", Longleaf Film Festival 2017
- "Grand Jury Prize", "Best Director", "Best Editing", "Best Original Music", "Best Photography", London Independent Film Awards 2017
- "Best Documentary", Snake Alley Festival of Film 2017
- "Best Documentary", Kraljevski Film Festival 2016
- "Best Documentary", Hoosierdance International Film Festival 2017
- "Best Documentary", 5th Cluj Shorts International Short Film Festival 2017
- "Second Jury Prize", Carnegie Mellon Short Film Competition 2017
- "Vision Award", Mount Vernon Film Festival 2016
- "First Jury Prize", ForadCamp, Cinema and Nature Festival 2016
- "Susy Award, Special Jury Mention", Terra Di Tutti Film Festival 2016
- "Special Jury Mention", Ferrara Film Festival 2016
- "Special Jury Mention", 6th Tlachana Fest 2017
- "Jury Prize", 8th Certamen Internacional de Cortometrajes Roberto Di Chiara 2016
- "Special Jury Mention", 14th International Ethno Film Festival The Heart of Slavonia 2017
- "Special Jury Mention", Short of the Year 2016
- "Best Documentary" , 8th Short To The Point 2016
- "Award of Excellence", The Impact DOCS Awards 2017
- "Best Documentary", Cosmic Film Festival 2017
- "Best Documentary Short Film", Atlas Awards 2017
- "Best Documentary", RiverReel International Film Festival 2017
- "Best Documentary Short Film", Maracay International Film Festival 2017
- "Special Jury Mention", Falcon International Film Festival
- "Best Editing", Real Time Film Festival 2017
- "Best Documentary", "Best Human Rights Film", "Audience Award", Open Window International Film Challenge 2017
- "Best Extra Long Short", Berlin Flash Film Festival 2017
- "Best Film", "Best Documentary" , 12 Months Film Festival 2017
- "Third Jury Prize", C&C Festival 2017

== Nominations ==
- "Best Foreign Documentary", China Academy Award of Documentary Film CAADF 2016
- "Best Documentary", 8th Prince of Prestige Academy Award 2017
- "Best Documentary", "Best Photography", The Alhambra Theatre Film Festival 2017
- "Best Documentary", "Best African Film", 8th World Music and Independent Film Festival 2017
- "Best Documentary" The Brightside Tavern Shorts Fest 2017

== Official Selections ==
- - 20th Flickers' Rhode Island International Film Festival (Rhode Island, USA, August 2016) (Oscar Qualifying)
- - 33ème Vues D'Afrique (Montreal, Canada, April 2017)
- - 17ème Un Poing C'est Court, Festival de Vaulx-en-Velin (Vaulx-en-Velin, France, January 2017)
- - 48th Nashville Film Festival (Nashville, USA, April 2017) OSCAR Qualifying
- - 14th Big Sky Documentary Film Festival (Missoula, Montana, USA, February 2017) OSCAR Qualifying
- - 17th Off Courts Trouville (Trouville, France, September 2016)
- - Aesthetica Short Film Festival (York, UK, November 2016) BAFTA Qualifying
- - 17th Festival Internacional de Cine de Lanzarote (Lanzarote, Spain, April 2017) GOYA Qualifying
- - 18th International Short Film Festival of Torrelavega (Spain, May 2017) GOYA Qualifying
- - 33rd Französische Filmtage (Tübingen, Stuttgart, Germany, November 2016)
- - 36th Minneapolis St Paul International Film Festival (Minneapolis, USA, April 2016)
- - 12ème Festival Paris Courts Devant (Paris, France, December 2016)
- - FIDBA, Festival Internacional de Cine Documental de Buenos Aires (Argentina, August 2016)
- - 25th Festival de Cine de Madrid PNR (Madrid, Spain, October 2016) GOYA Qualifying
- - 6th Carmarthen Bay Film Festival (Llanelli, Wales, May 2017) BAFTA CYMRU Qualifying
- - 23ème FEMI, Festival International du Cinéma de Guadeloupe (Guadeloupe, France, January 2017)
- - Oaxaca Film Festival (Oaxaca, Mexico, October 2016)
- - 19th FICA, Festival International de Cinema e Video Ambiental (Goias, Brazil, June 2017)
- - 18th Lucania Film Festival (Pisticci, Italy, August 2017)
- - 14th CinemadaMare Film Festival (Roma, Italy, June–September 2017)
- - Boston French Film Festival (Boston, USA, March 2017)
- - Bosphorus International Film Festival (Istanbul, Turkey, November 2016)
- - 22ème Festival International du Film Nancy-Lorraine (Nancy, France, September 2016)
- - 10th We The Peoples Film Festival (London, UK, November 2016)
- - Festival Internazionale Del Cinema Documentario Marcellino De Baggis (Taranto, Italy, May 2017)
- - 10th Psarokokalo, Athens International Short Film Festival (Athens, Greece, October 2016)
- - 20th OFF Cinema Festival (Poznan, Poland, November 2016)
- - 21st FESTIFIL, Festival la Fila de Cortometrajes (Valladolid, Spain, May 2017)
- - 45th Festival of Nations (Lenzig, Austria, June 2017)
- - 18th Mediteran Film Festival (Široki Brijeg, Bosnia, August 2017)
- - 26th Muestra Internacional de Cine de Palencia (Palencia, Spain, February 2017)
- - 17th Festival Internacional de Cine de Derechos Humanos FICDH (Buenos Aires, Argentina, June 2017)
- - 11th River Film Festival (Padova, Italy, June 2017)
- - 8th Cinéma Sous Les Etoiles (Montréal, Canada, July 2017)
- - 6th PUFF Film Festival Hong-Kong (Hong-Kong, China, June 2017)
- - 13ème Festival L'ici Et L'ailleurs (Saint-Martin-en-Bresse, France, April 2017)
- - 17th International Izmir Short Film Festival (Izmir, Turkey, November 2016)
- - 24th OpenEyes Filmfest (Marburg, Germany, July 2017)
- - 11th MOSCA – Mostra Audiovisual de Cambuquira (Cambuquira, Brazil, July 2017)
- - 19th Spokane International Film Festival (Spokane, Washington, USA, January 2017)
- - 15th MIDEC Muestra Internacional de Cortometrajes de la Laguna (La Laguna, Spain, June 2017)
- - 15th Riverside International Film Festival (Riverside, California, USA, April 2017)
- - 19th Ismailia International Film Festival (Ismailia, Egypt, April 2017)
- - 8ème Festival Périples et Cie (Mâcon, France, November 2016)
- - 23rd Twin Rivers Media Film Festival (Asheville, New York State, February 2017)
- - 8th Cordoba International Film Festival (Cordoba, Spain, August 2017)
- - 6th Prokuplje Short Film Festival (Prokuplje, Serbia, May 2017)
- - 6th Capital City Film Festival (Washington, USA, April 2017)
- - 13th KO & Digital, Festival Internacional de Cine Solidario (Barcelona, Spain, December 2016)
- - Festival International du Film de Tanger (Tanger, Morocco, September 2016)
- - 16ème Festival Lumières D'Afrique (Besançon, France, November 2016)
- - 12th Sardinia Film Festival (Alghero, Italy, June 2017)
- - 14th In The Palace International Film Festival (Sofia, Bulgaria, December 2016)
- - 7th FINI, Festival Internacional de la Imagen (Pachuca, Mexico, May 2017)
- - MAFICI, Festival Internacional de Cine de Puerto Madryn (Puerto Madryn, Argentina, November 2016)
- - 19th FICMEC, Festival de Cine Medioambiental de Canarias (Tenerife, Spain, May 2017)
- - 12th SoCal Film Festival (Huntington Beach, California, USA, February 2017)
- - 12th Baghdad International Film Festival (Baghdad, Iraq, December 2016)
- - Festival du Film Documentaire de Saint-Louis du Sénégal (Saint-Louis, Senegal, December 2016)
- - Wolves Independent International Film Festival (Utena, Lituania, December 2016)
- - Longleaf Film Festival (Raleigh, North Carolina, USA, May 2017)
- - London Independent Film Awards (London, UK, February 2017)
- - Snake Alley Festival of Film (Burlington, Vermont, USA, June 2017)
- - Kraljevski Film Festival (Kralijevo, Serbia, September 2016)
- - Hoosierdance International Film Festival (Kokomo, Indiana, USA, June 2017)
- - 5th Cluj Shorts International Short Film Festival (Cluj Napoca, Romania, April 2017)
- - Carnegie Mellon Short Film Competition (Pittsburgh, USA, March 2017)
- - Mount Vernon Film Festival (New York, USA, October 2016)
- - ForadCamp, Cinema and Nature Festival (Barcelona, Spain, October 2016)
- - Terra Di Tutti Film Festival (Bologna, Italy, October 2016)
- - Ferrara Film Festival (Ferrara, Italy, March 2016)
- - 6th Tlachana Fest (Tlachana, Mexico, April 2017)
- - 8th Certamen Internacional de Cortometrajes Roberto Di Chiara (Florencio Varela, Argentina, November 2016)
- - 14th International Ethno Film Festival The Heart of Slavonia (Äakovo, Croatia, June 2017)
- - Short of the Year (Madrid, Spain, May 2016)
- - 8th Short To The Point (Bucharest, Romania, December 2016)
- - The Impact DOCS Awards (La Jolla, California, USA, January 2017)
- - Cosmic Film Festival (Orlando, Florida, USA, February 2017)
- - Atlas Awards (Boston, USA, January 2017)
- - RiverReel International Film Festival (Cincinnati, Ohio, March 2017)
- - Maracay International Film Festival (Maracay, Venezuela, May 2017)
- - Falcon International Film Festival (London, UK, April 2017)
- - Real Time Film Festival (Lagos, Nigeria, June 2017)
- - Open Window International Film Challenge (Chennai, India, March 2017)
- - Berlin Flash Film Festival (Berlin, Germany, June 2017)
- - 12 Months Film Festival (Cluj, Romania, June 2017)
- - C&C Festival (Matulji, Croatia, July 2017)
- - China Academy Awards (Beijing, China, December 2016)
- - 8th Prince of Prestige Academy Award (Winter Park, USA, July 2017)
- - The Alhambra Theatre Film Festival (Evansville, Indiana, USA, April 2017)
- - 8th World Music and Independent Film Festival (Jeffersonton, Virginia, USA, July 2017)
- - The Brightside Tavern Shorts Fest (Jersey City, USA, March 2017)
- - Mostremp, Cinema Rural Al Pallars (Tremp, Spain, August 2016)
- - Les Rencontres Documentaires de Koudougou (Koudougou, Burkina-Faso, April 2017)
- - TAFF, The African Film Festival (Dallas, USA, July 2017)
- - 9th FreeNetWorld International Film Festival (Nis, Serbia, December 2016)
- - 14th World Film Festival (Tartu, Estonia, March 2017)
- - FICCVELO, Festival de Cine Carlos Velo (La Corogne, Spain, December 2016)
- - Festival Internacional de Cortometrajes de Medellin – FICME (Medellin, Colombia, November 2016)
- - 9th Trenton Film Festival (Trenton, New Jersey, USA, March 2017)
- - Viva Film Festival (Sarajevo, Bosnie, September 2017)
- - Earth Day Film Festival (San Francisco, California, USA, April 2017)
- - 7th Irvine International Film Festival (Irvine, California, January 2017)
- - FINDECOIN, Festival Internacional de Cortometrajes (Puerto la Cruz, Venezuela, February 2017)
- - Muestra Internacional de Cine Independiente Oftalmica (Veracruz, Mexico, November 2016)
- - Festival Internacional de Cine de Los Derechos Humanos de Bolivia – El Séptimo Ojo Es Tuyo (Sucre, Bolivia, August 2017)
- - Festival Internacional de Cine "FICNOVA" (Madrid, Spain, October 2016)
- - 14th Fear No Film Festival (Salt Lake City, Utah, USA, June 2017)
- - 12th Bay Street Film Festival (Thunder Bay, Canada, September 2017)
- - 6th The Workers Unite Film Festival (New York, USA, May 2017)
- - 5th AegeanDocs International Documentary Film Festival (Mytilene, Greece, October 2017)
- - Muestra de Cine Documental Central-Doc/TLX (Tlaxcala, Mexico, November 2016)
- - Festival de Cine de Ituzaingó (Buenos Aires, Argentina, September 2017)
- - Emerge Film Festival of Maine (Auburn, Maine, USA, April 2017)
- - Crossing The Screen (Eastbourne, UK, November 2016)
- - Glass City Film Festival (Toledo, Ohio, USA, May 2017)
- - Solidando Film Festival (Cagliari, Italy, December 2016)
- - 6th The People's Film Festival (Harlem, New York, USA, June 2017)
- - Biosegura Cine, Medio Ambiente y Mundo Rural (Jaen, Spain, June 2017)
- - 10th Columbia Gorge International Film Festival (Venice, California, September 2017)
- - Salon International de la Luz (Bogota, Colombia, May 2017)
- - Rural FilmFest (Ciudad Real, Spain, August 2017)
- - Miraj International Film Festival (Miraj, India, February 2017)
- - Festimal de Ojo, Festival de Cine Etnografico (Quito, Ecuador, September 2016)
- - Afro Film Festival « Ananse » (Calle, Colombia, September 2016)
- - Festival Espacio Enter (Tenerife, Spain, December 2016)
- - Festival Internacional de Cine de Querétaro (Querétaro, Mexico, July 2017)
- - Annual Los Angeles International Culture Film Festival (Los Angeles, USA, April 2017)
- - Festival Internacional de Cine de la Universidad de Baja California (Colonia Nueva, Mexico, October)
- - 8th The WE Film Festival (Maastricht, Netherland, May 2017)
- - Tegenstroom (Ijzendijke, Netherland, December 2016)
- - Bucharest Shortscut (Bucharest, Romania, October 2016)
- - Paphos International Film Festival (Paphos, Cyprus, June 2017)
- - Synimatica Short Film Festival (Meridan, USA, July 2017)
- - EG3 Paris Film Festival (Fontenay-aux-Roses, France, June 2018)
- - Door Kinetic Arts Festival (Baileys Harbor, Wisconsin, USA, June 2017)
- - DFK New Wave (Kolkata, India, March 2017)
- - Hobnobben Film Festival (Waine, Indiana, June 2017)
- - One Country One Film (Le Mans, France, July 2017)
- - North Carolina Film Award (Raleigh, USA, July 2017)
- - Mid Tenn Film Fest (Smyrna, Tennessee, USA, July 2017)
- - High Peak Independent Film Festival (New Mills, UK, July 2017)
- - 18th Fine Cut (USA, June 2017)
- - Through My Eyes (Los Angeles, USA, March 2018)
- - Indie Film Depot (USA, March 2017)
- - Arete Film Festival (Oshkosh, Wisconsin, USA, May 2017)
- - FECIP, Festival de Cine de Portoviejo (Portoviejo, Ecuador, June 2017)
- - PickurFlick Indie Film Festival (Aryana, India, March 2017)
- - The Quarantine Film Festival (Varna, Bulgaria, July 2017)
- - Believe in Your Dreams, Arkansas Film Festival (Arkansas, USA, December 2017)
- - Howling Wolf International Film Festival (Glasgow, Scotland, September 2017)
- - RAI Film Festival (Bristol, UK, April 2017)
- - Cinema Grand Prix (Jawa Barat, Indonesia, January 2017)
- - Motion For Pictures (Cary, North Carolina, USA, April 2017)

== Production ==
Director and Producer: Simon Panay

Chief Operator: Nicolas Canton

Sound Operator: Daniel Audry

Music Composer: Philippe Fivet

== Distribution ==
USA and Canada: 7th Art Releasing

Worldwide: Adastra Films

Festival Distribution: Promofest
