= Godless (2015 film) =

2015 American romantic drama film

- Theatrical film poster
- Directed by: Joshua Lim
- Written by: Joshua Lim
- Produced by: Joshua Lim; Stephen Lim
- Starring: Craig Jordan; Michael E. Pitts
- Cinematography: Wey Wang
- Edited by: Evan Christensen; Joseph Hatton; Lin Jinjiong
- Release dates: August 6, 2015 (Rhode Island); August 17, 2016 (USA)
- Running time: 82 minutes
- Country: United States
- Language: English

Godless is a 2015 American romantic comedy film, written and directed by Joshua Lim. The film stars Craig Jordan and Michael E. Pitts. It premiered at the Rhode Island International Film Festival in 2015, before subsequently being released on streaming in the USA in 2016.

== Synopsis ==
Two brothers reconnect after the death of their parents. They also have a complex deep love for one another that borders on incest.

== Cast ==
- Craig Jordan as Nate Flanigan
- Michael E. Pitts as Steven Flanigan
- Garrett Young as Trent
- Jefferson Rogers as Ray
- Michell Gallagher as Mary Flanigan
- Joseph Aloysius McGinn as David Flanigan
- Larry Stone as Uncle Terry
- TJay Howard as Herman
- Lovlee Carroll as Jessica

== Reception ==
Keith Dooley of Letterboxd rated it 1.5/5 stars and derided the film: "It almost has a The Room style badness to it but not entertaining like that classic...The cliché dialogue and inept direction are wasted on a film that could have been much more entertaining what with the taboo topic it deals with." Don Ventura of Letterboxd also gave it 1.5 stars, and opined about the screenplay: "The dialogue is atrocious and feels like it was written by someone who has never spoken to humans."
