= LaRoy, Texas =

2023 film by Shane Atkinson

- Release poster
- Directed by: Shane Atkinson
- Written by: Shane Atkinson
- Produced by: John Magaro; Caddy Vanasirikul; Sébastien Aubert; Jeremie Guiraud
- Starring: John Magaro; Steve Zahn; Megan Stevenson; Matthew Del Negro; Dylan Baker
- Cinematography: Mingjue Hu
- Edited by: Sebastian Mialik
- Music by: Delphine Malaussena; Rim Laurens; Clément Peiffer
- Production companies: Orogen Entertainment; The Exchange; Needle's Eye Productions; Ellly Films; NEXT Productions; FLOTE Entertainment; Adastra Films
- Distributed by: Brainstorm Media
- Release dates: June 8, 2023 (Tribeca); April 12, 2024 (United States)
- Running time: 112 minutes
- Country: United States
- Language: English

LaRoy, Texas is a 2023 American crime comedy film written and directed by Shane Atkinson, and starring John Magaro, Steve Zahn, Megan Stevenson, Matthew Del Negro and Dylan Baker. It was released on April 12, 2024.

== Plot ==
Ray operates a hardware store with his brother Junior in a small Texas town. He gets several photographs from private detective Skip. Taken during a stake-out at a local motel, the pictures indicate infidelity by Ray's wife Stacy-Lynn. Distraught, Ray buys a revolver and drives to that motel where he contemplates suicide.

While Ray sits in his car, a stranger gets into the vehicle. The stranger mistakes Ray for contract killer Harry. The stranger hands Ray several thousand dollars as payment for an assassination which must be done the next day. The stranger leaves a street address on a piece of paper amongst the banknotes as the only clue as to the target's identity. Harry arrives as Ray drives off.

Reluctant to accept that there's anything wrong with his marriage, Ray considers keeping the money for financing a beauty salon which Stacy-Lynn wants to open. Without a clear idea how to carry out a contract killing, he drives to the address and follows the man living there to a bar so clumsily that he's promptly "rumbled". The man forces Ray into his car, where Ray shoots the man. Ray dumps the corpse by the roadside, accidentally losing one of Skip's photographs of his wife next to the body. On his way home, Ray finds out from Junior's wife that Stacy-Lynn has been having an affair with his brother, though he doesn't believe it.

Police establish that the dead man is a local lawyer, James Barlow. The photo of Stacy-Lynn discovered near Barlow's body makes them suspect her involvement in the murder. The stranger who hired Ray as a hitman finds him working in the hardware store. He tells Ray that he broke into Barlow's office last night and there was no money in the safe. He accuses Ray of stealing a large sum out of Barlow's safe and gives Ray one day to return the stolen money. Ray and Skip visit Barlow's office and find that Barlow was engaged in a blackmailing case for his client Adam Ledoux, who runs a large car dealership in the town.

Harry locates the bar from which he was called to make arrangements for a hit on Barlow. There he finds a waitress to help him with his inquiries. Harry visits the waitress and discovers her boyfriend put a contract on Barlow to get the payout money. Harry tortures the boyfriend for information and kills him before leaving the waitress alone.

Ledoux informs Skip and Ray that Barlow was handling the payout of $250,000 for him and his wife to the blackmailer. The blackmailer threatened to disclose Ledoux's philandering, which would ruin their dealership. Later Ledoux's wife tells Skip and Ray about Ledoux's gambling addiction and that the payout money was hers. Ray recollects that Barlow had a briefcase with him, but he didn't take it into the bar. He assumes it must have been left in Barlow's car, which was towed away after Ray shot Barlow. Skip and Ray locate the car and find the case with money inside it. However, at gunpoint Ray forces Skip to give it to him because he still hopes to finance Stacy-Lynn's beauty parlor and fix their marriage. When Ray arrives home, Stacy-Lynn and Junior turn him in to the police for murder, keeping the briefcase with the money.

Harry ambushes the police vehicle transporting Ray to the county jail and shoots both of the policemen dead. Ray manages to escape during the shootout. When he gets to Junior's house, his brother's wife tells Ray that Junior has left her for Stacy-Lynn. She says Junior has been embezzling money from their hardware store for years.

Harry takes Skip captive at gunpoint and calls Ray from Skip's mobile phone, demanding that the money be returned to him. Ray spots his brother's truck parked at a motel. He finds his wife and Junior in the shower where he shoots his brother and announces to Stacy-Lynn that he wants a divorce.

When Harry arrives with Skip at the motel, Ray demands that Skip be released first. After exchanging fire with Harry, Ray convinces Skip to take the case with the money and leave without him. With both men facing off in a small motel room with their firearms ready, Ray asks if Harry would be willing to leave town on Ray's letting him go - Harry declines saying that it's more important to finish the started things. Both of them then fatally injure each other with abdominal gunshot wounds.

The film ends with Skip stopping his car reluctantly to offer Stacy-Lynn a lift and her hesitantly accepting his offer.

== Cast ==
- John Magaro as Ray
- Steve Zahn as Skip
- Dylan Baker as Harry
- Megan Stevenson as Stacy-Lynn
- Matthew Del Negro as Junior
- Brannon Cross as Brian Tiller
- Vic Browder as James Barlow
- Darcy Shean as Midge LeDoux
- Emily Pendergast as Kayla
- Brad Leland as Adam Ledoux
- Galadriel Stineman as Angie
- Bob Clendenin as Ben Finney

== Production ==
In May 2022, it was announced that Steve Zahn, Jared Harris and John Magaro were cast in the film.

Principal photography began in and around Albuquerque, New Mexico in late August 2022.

== Release ==
The film premiered at the Tribeca Film Festival, under the name LaRoy on June 8, 2023. It was released by Brainstorm Media on April 12, 2024.

== Reception ==
=== Critical response ===
On the review aggregator website Rotten Tomatoes, 98% of 43 critics' reviews are positive. The website's consensus reads: "Distinguished by sharp writing and a talented cast, LaRoy, Texas is a generally satisfying neo-noir treat for crime thriller fans." Metacritic, which uses a weighted average, assigned the film a score of 69 out of 100, based on eight critics, indicating "generally favorable" reviews.

Christian Zilko of IndieWire graded the film a B+ and wrote, "Watching LaRoy is a lot like the seedy motel affairs that all of its characters seem to be having — two hours of fun, followed by a tragic feeling of emptiness and a desire for a shower."

=== Accolades ===
The film received three awards (Grand Prix of the Jury, Audience Award and International Critics' Award) at the Deauville American Film Festival in 2023.
