= Pascal Lorot =

French economist and geopolitician

- Born: 30 April 1960 (age 65); Clichy
- Occupations: Economist and geopolitician

Pascal Lorot (born 30 April 1960 at Clichy) is a French economist and geopolitician.

== Biography ==
Lorot earned an economics PhD from the l'Institut d'études politiques de Paris (1987).

He has been the president of Institut Choiseul for International Politics and Geoeconomics since 2003, and has also been a member of the French Commission of Energy Regulation since November 2003.

Lorot's past activities include: director of economic studies for the French oil company Total (1995-2002), many ministerial cabinet positions, a counselor for the president of the European Bank of Reconstruction and Development (BERD), and a researcher at the French Institute of International Relations (IFRI). He also was the president of the economical commission of the Club de l'horloge.

Lorot is the founder and director of the academic journal Géoéconomie, and director of six other journals focused on geopolitical issues including:

- Monde Chinois was founded in 2004 and is a leading French journal dedicated to the analysis of economic, strategic, political and cultural evolutions in the Chinese world (People's Republic of China, Taïwan, Hong Kong and Singapore).
- Politique Américaine is a French-language journal dedicated to contemporary issues in the United States of America.
- Problèmes d'Amérique latine is a major French-language journal on current political, economic and cultural change in Latin America.
- Nordiques was founded in 2003 and is the only French-language journal dedicated to the policies and strategies of states in Northern Europe and the Baltic.
- Maghreb-Machrek is one of the largest, most renowned international reviews dedicated to the Arab world.

== Contribution to international relations ==
Along with American economist and consultant Edward Luttwak, Lorot helped develop a branch of international relations study known as geoeconomics (sometimes spelled geo-economics). According to Lorot:

"Geoeconomics analyzes economic strategies--notably commercial--, decided upon by states in a political setting aiming to protect their own economies or certain well-identified sectors of it, to help their national enterprises acquire technology or to capture certain segments of the world market relative to production or commercialization of a product. The possession or control of such a share confers to the entity–-state or national enterprise–-an element of power and international influence and helps to reinforce its economic and social potential." (Translated from French, italics are contributor's own)

== Books ==
- Le siècle de la Chine, Choiseul, 2007
- Planète Océane. L'essentiel de la mer (co-direction of the work with Jean Guellec), Choiseul, 2006
- A qui profite la guerre ?, Editions 1, 2003
- Guerre et économie (co-direction of the work with Jean-François Daguzan), Ellipses, 2003
- Dictionnaire de la mondialisation (direction of the work), Ellipses, 2001
- Introduction à la Géoéconomie (direction of the work), Economica, 1999
- La Géopolitique (with François Thual), collection "Clefs", Montchretien, 1997, 2002 (2ème édition)
- Histoire de la Géopolitique, Economica, 1995
- Histoire de la Perestroïka, "Que-sais-je ?", P.U.F. 1993
- Les nouvelles frontières de l'Europe (direction of the work), Economica, 1993
- Le réveil balte, collection "Pluriel-intervention", Hachette, 1991
- La conquête de l'Est - Les atouts de la France dans le nouvel ordre européen (avec Georges Ayache), Calmann-Lévy, 1991
- Les pays baltes, "Que-sais-je ?", P.U.F. 1991. 2ème éd.
- Finance internationale Soviétique - Quelques éléments de réflexion, collection "Les cahiers", IFRI, 1989
- Singapour, Taiwan, Hong-Kong, Corée du Sud : les nouveaux conquérants ? (with Thierry Schwob), Hatier, 1986, 3ème éd. 1988
- Les zones franches dans le monde (with Thierry Schwob), collection "Notes et études documentaires", La documentation française, 1987
- Les zones franches, éditions de l'Institut économique de Paris, 1984.
