= Typical Rick =

American television series

- Genre: Television comedy
- Created by: Nicholaus Goossen; Nick Swardson
- Directed by: Nicholaus Goossen
- Starring: Nick Swardson; Simon Rex; Megan Stevenson; Charlie Sheen Special participation
- Country of origin: United States
- Original language: English
- No. of seasons: 2

Production
- Running time: 43 minutes

Original release
- Network: Comedy Central
- Release: November 14, 2016 – July 24, 2017

Typical Rick is an American television series produced by Comedy Central, created by Nicholaus Goossen and Nick Swardson. Comedy Central declined to renew the series for a third season.

== Cast ==
- Nick Swardson as Gary
- Simon Rex as Rick
- Megan Stevenson as Amy
- Chris D'Elia as Lukee Sado
- Alana Johnston as Juice Bar Bianca
- Alessia Sushko as Alessiaa
