= Gary of the Pacific =

- Directed by: thedownlowconcept
- Written by: thedownlowconcept
- Produced by: Fiona Copland
- Starring: Josh Thomson; Megan Stevenson; David Fane
- Cinematography: Dave Garbett
- Edited by: Nigel McCulloch
- Music by: Chabs And Milky
- Production companies: Filmwork; Imagezone
- Release date: 16 March 2017
- Running time: 87 minutes
- Country: New Zealand
- Language: English

Gary of the Pacific is a 2017 New Zealand comedy film directed by thedownlowconcept, starring Josh Thomson, Megan Stevenson and David Fane.

== Cast ==
- Josh Thomson as Gary
- Megan Stevenson as Chloe
- David Fane as Dad
- Taofi Mose-Tuiloma as Lani
- Matt Whelan as Nelson

== Reception ==
Alex Casey of The New Zealand Herald rated the film 3 stars out of 5, writing that while the film "has enough in it to enjoy, but you can't help but sense at times that it is simply treading safe waters instead of taking the plunge."

Steve Kilgallon of Stuff rated the film 3 stars out of 5, rating that the film "bounces along pleasantly and doesn't outstay its welcome."
