= The Bondsman =

American television series

- Genre: Action; Horror; Black comedy
- Created by: Grainger David
- Starring: Kevin Bacon; Jennifer Nettles; Beth Grant; Damon Herriman; Maxwell Jenkins; Jolene Purdy
- Country of origin: United States
- Original language: English
- No. of series: 1
- No. of episodes: 8

Production
- Executive producers: Erik Oleson; Jason Blum; Kevin Bacon; Grainger David; Jeremy Gold; Chris Dickie; Chris McCumber; Paul Shapiro
- Producer: Alex Shevchenko
- Editors: Nathan D. Gunn; Geofrey Hildrew
- Running time: 25–35 minutes
- Production companies: Medina Films; Marker 96; CrimeThink; Blumhouse Television; Amazon MGM Studios

Original release
- Network: Amazon Prime Video
- Release: April 3, 2025

The Bondsman is an American black comedy action horror television series created by Grainger David for Amazon Prime Video. The series premiered on April 3, 2025. In May 2025, the series was canceled after one season.

== Premise ==
Hub is a backwoods bounty hunter who comes back from the dead with an unexpected second chance at life, love, and a nearly forgotten musical career — only to find that his old job now has a demonic new twist.

== Cast and characters ==
=== Main ===
- Kevin Bacon as Hub Halloran
- Jennifer Nettles as Maryanne Dice
- Beth Grant as Kitty Halloran
- Damon Herriman as Lucky Callahan
- Maxwell Jenkins as Cade Halloran
- Jolene Purdy as Midge Kusatsu

=== Supporting ===
- Mike Kaye as Tommy "Tater" Dean
- Kathrine Barnes as Cheryl Dawson
- Denitra Isler as Sheriff Ruby
- Alea Hansinger as Deirdre Donovan
- Jay Ali as Ali "Cosmo" Khan

== Episodes ==
No.	Title	Directed by	Written by	Original release date
1	"Pot O' Gold"	Sanaa Hamri	Grainger David	April 3, 2025
While tracking a local bounty, Hub is ambushed and murdered at a roadside motel. Awakening the next day trapped inside a wall of the motel, Hub emerges alive but with his wounds from the previous night. He captures an arsonist, Tater, who is there to destroy the evidence and help the Earles collect on the insurance money. Returning home, his wounds heal and he enlists his mother, Kitty, a devout church-goer and former bounty hunter, to help him track down the Earles. She reveals that Clyde is out on bail posted by "Lucky" Callahan, a local bar owner currently dating Hub's estranged wife. Now, knowing that the ambush was a murder-for-hire deal, Hub confronts Lucky but is interrupted by Maryanne and their son, Cade. Instead, Hub pursues the Earles to a local cabin to gather evidence when they are attacked by a demon possessing Pastor Ron from the local church. The possessed Pastor Ron kills the Earles, but Hub escapes. At home, he finds Kitty meeting with Midge, his new handler from the Pot O'Gold corporation, Satan's front company on Earth, who explains that he is now a bounty hunter for the devil.
2	"Valacor"	Sanaa Hamri	Erik Oleson	April 3, 2025
A flashback shows Pastor Ron's death and a demon (Valacor) possessing his corpse before seeking out Hub at the Earles' cabin. Back at home, Hub and Kitty listen to Midge's explanation of recent events: Hub is now a demon-hunter seeking out hell's escapees—a rare, but dangerous occurrence that risks reigniting the war with heaven. He receives a reprieve from hell provided that he accepts each assignment and delivers without fail, as either refusal or failure will reinstate his death and punishment. Demons that escape typically kill, then possess, a dead host to avoid the risk of exorcism, but Midge tells him that a bullet to the head will destroy the demon and the host body. Hub reluctantly accepts and confides in Kitty that he intends to find a loophole while he has time, and Kitty suggests that he also try to make amends for whatever deeds sent him to hell in the first place, starting with reconciling with his family. Lucky and Hub begin investigating each other, while Hub makes several overtures to Maryanne and Cade to win them over. Later, Hub and Kitty track the possessed Pastor through the electrical grid, as his presence causes surges nearby. They find Pastor Ron/Valacor, but not before he has murdered a local electrician in a ritual sacrifice; working together, Hub and Kitty manage to crush the Pastor's head with heavy machinery, but his body immediately immolates and sets fire to the entire building. While they narrowly escape, they do not see that Tater has been covertly taking pictures of their activities.
3	"Marphos"	Thor Freudenthal	Erik Oleson & Grainger David	April 3, 2025
Local social media star, Deirdre Donovan, is drowned and possessed by a demon manipulating water (Marphos). Hub offers to take Cade to school and let him get practice driving, which initially impresses Cade; however, Hub later reveals that this was a subterfuge to share information about Lucky's past out of concern for their well-being. Cade, already knowing about Lucky's past, is insulted and hurt by the pretext, but Hub receives a call for his next case and the two proceed to track down the possessed Deirdre together, even though Hub leaves out the demonic details. He tracks Deirdre/Marphos to a closed community pool but not before the possessed teenager ritualistically murdered a local attendee. The two fight and Hub gains the upper hand, killing the demon in the pool and setting the facility on fire when the body immolates. The local Sheriff, Ruby, arrives to investigate and Hub reluctantly uses Cade as a decoy to draw her away so that he can escape. Cade is arrested, and Hub, Maryanne, and Kitty arrive to bail him out, resulting in a major argument between Maryanne and Hub about Lucky and an upcoming trip to Nashville. In a flashback showing one month prior, Hub digs a grave near his office and buries Cheryl Dawson, a missing local.
4	"Erdos"	Thor Freudenthal	Erik Oleson & Grainger David	April 3, 2025
Deputy Sheriff Briggs extorts a local food truck owner for free meals and cash before being possessed by an earth demon, Erdos. Back at the office, Hub reminisces about his short-lived music career with Maryanne while Kitty prepares a bag of crystal meth and a shotgun to plant as evidence against Lucky. Notified of the recent possession, Hub goes after Briggs while Kitty goes to Lucky's club to plant the evidence; however, she is nearly caught by Maryanne, who overlooks her suspicions out of her affection for Kitty. In return, Kitty points Maryanne back to Hub to talk out their recent difficulties. Maryanne uses her phone to track down Hub at a local hardware store, not realizing that he is there to confront the demon. Both are drawn into the fight with Briggs/Erdos, who has ritualistically murdered one of the store's assistants. They manage to kill Briggs/Erdos together, causing his body to immolate and set the store on fire. Back at the office, Hub explains his new 'job' and confesses that Lucky didn't just try to kill him—he succeeded. Lucky is arrested based on Kitty's planted evidence, and Hub sends Maryanne and Cade to Nashville for their protection from the demons. Sheriff Ruby asks Hub several questions about Briggs' disappearance, tipping him off that she suspects something.
5	"Slypharis"	Lauren Wolkstein	Erik Oleson & Satinder Kaur	April 3, 2025
A newly engaged couple gets into a scuffle with a fisherman at a local lake with two Slypharis demons possessing the men as they die. Lucky is released from prison and returns to the club, both professing his innocence and renewing his vendetta against Hub. At the office, Hub finds Kitty sleeping after researching demonology; struck by an idea, he begins mapping the recent demon breakouts and sacrifices to find that they are forming a Satanic pentagram in shape. In flashbacks, Midge struggles to pay for her son, Benji's, cancer treatments and sells her business, belongings, and savings. While researching online, she encounters a "Pot O'Gold" advertisement that mystically responds to her needs, and the following day, two representatives (Cosmo and Sunshine) show up with a contract in hand to sell her soul in exchange for Benji's recovery. Unlike Hub, her job is to convince others to sell their souls in a pyramid scheme. Because she is still living, she cannot directly see demons like Hub, but can see the supernatural when reflected in a mirror. In the present, Hub locates Midge and presents his research, which she rebuffs. Hub tracks the Slypharis demons and a hostage to a local bridge, but he is unable to kill them or rescue her before his vehicle is hit by a car.
6	"Revelations"	Lauren Wolkstein	Erik Oleson	April 3, 2025
Worried about Hub, Kitty tracks his vehicle to the accident but finds him missing; at the bridge, she discovers the hostage has already been ritualistically murdered by the demons and the scene filled with police investigators. Hub awakens in the holding cell in his office, discovering that Lucky hit his car and captured him. Using torture, Lucky wants Hub to confess his misdeeds on camera for Maryanne's benefit. Hub refuses and Lucky begins smashing his fingers with a hammer. In flashbacks, we learn that while Lucky was trying to turn his life around, Hub threatened him and tried to force him to break up with Maryanne, unsuccessfully. Hub got very drunk and attempted to kill Lucky in the club after hours, but instead shot Cheryl Dawson by mistake. Guilt-ridden, Hub covered up the evidence and buried Cheryl's body; while Lucky suspected, he could never prove Hub's involvement, but believing him to be a danger, commissioned the original attempt on Hub's life. In Nashville, Maryanne and Cade receive a call from Sheriff Ruby; while seemingly pleasant, Ruby has amassed significant evidence about Hub's activities and tricks Maryanne into lying for him, thereby confirming her involvement. The Slypharis demons arrive at Hub's office and attack Lucky, who barely escapes. Hub breaks his other fingers to escape his cuffs and manages to kill the demons with weapons from his armory and a chainsaw. Kitty arrives and tends to his wounds, while Maryanne and Cade return from Nashville and concerns about the Sheriff. Hub tells them everything and the family decides to work together on whatever comes next.
7	"Pyralis"	Catriona McKenzie	Erik Oleson & Grainger David	April 3, 2025
At a playground, a young boy goes missing from the merry-go-round. At the office, Hub tries to tell Kitty about his part in Cheryl's death, but she stops him before he can explain since the family is back together. Scared, the family begins praying together for help when Midge arrives. Having looked at Hub's research after all, she confirms that he is correct: the ritualistic murders are an orchestrated attempt to release a high-level demon, one of the "Chained Seven"—fallen angels now imprisoned in hell. Knowing that they're tracking a Pyralis (fire demon), they use Hub's map to identify the neighborhood where it will commit its ritual sacrifice and head there to evacuate the locals, with Hub and Midge searching to identify which one is possessed. Lucky goes to church after hours with Tater, trying to understand the connection between Hub and the demons; he pledges that he'll be God's holy warrior in exchange for a sign, at which point, Sheriff Ruby rings Tater's phone, which Lucky interprets as a sign to turn his evidence over to the Police. The Hallorans and Midge discover the Pyralis in a young boy, but Midge cannot bring herself to shoot him, and she instead becomes the sacrifice as the house is pulled into the Earth in a blaze. Hub's family returns home to give each other solace, and Hub and Maryanne sleep together. After waking, Hub discovers that the chained angel did escape and is set to emerge at the Halloran Bail Bonds office.
8	"Lilith"	Catriona McKenzie	Erik Oleson	April 3, 2025
Hub is devastated to discover the demon, Lilith, has possessed Cheryl Dawson's body. Standing over her empty grave, he confesses to Maryanne what happened, leaving her disappointed and distraught. Hub, feeling guilty, attempts to surrender himself for judgment, but Cosmo arrives and drops off the newly resurrected Midge, who explains that the devil isn't done with either of them yet. Midge explains that Lilith has escaped before and that she was last recaptured in an abbey outside of Jerusalem; looking at diagrams, Hub deduces that her captors used another pentagram to send her back (the way out is also the way in). Cheryl/Lilith arrives in town and demonstrates a hatred of music and an ability to use mind control; for women, this puts them into a fugue state, but the men are forced to kill themselves by ripping their own jaws off. Lucky assists the police in searching the Halloran's office and arresting Kitty, Maryanne, and Cade, though Cade is not charged. Sheriff Ruby uses threats against Cade to pressure Maryanne into luring Hub into a trap at the club. Hub and Midge create a trap for Lilith which works in luring and keeping her in place; however, she proposes a counter-offer to Hub: she will let Cheryl return, thus erasing the murder and setting Hub free, in exchange for Hub releasing her from the trap. Hub agrees and Lilith vacates Cheryl's body and inhabits a Raven instead, with Midge warning that there may be dire consequences for Hub's 'loophole'. Hub arrives with a living Cheryl to the club, where both are immediately arrested due to reports of their recent activities. Maryanne retreats to her dressing room where Lilith returns and possesses her, still alive. Lucky arrives to reconcile with Maryanne, but is killed by Lilith, who then takes the stage and holds all the men hostage. There, she offers Hub a new deal: as long as Lilith is free, the devil will keep coming for her (and by extension, Maryanne), so his only means to protect her is to serve Lilith.

== Production ==
In June 2023, it was reported that Prime Video commissioned eight half-hour episodes, created by Grainger David. Erik Oleson serves as the showrunner and executive produces alongside Paul Shapiro for the CrimeThink production company. Jason Blum, Chris McCumber, Jeremy Gold, and Chris Dickie executive produce for Blumhouse Television, along with Kevin Bacon and Grainger David.

Filming took place in Grantville, Georgia in April 2024.

On May 16, 2025, the series was canceled after one season.

=== Casting ===
In June 2023, Kevin Bacon was cast in the lead role as an undead bounty hunter. In January 2024, Jennifer Nettles was cast alongside Bacon. In March 2024, Beth Grant, Damon Herriman, Maxwell Jenkins, Jolene Purdy joined the show in series regular roles. In April 2025, Variety reported that Kathrine Barnes, Mike Kaye, and Jay Ali had joined the cast.

== Release ==
The series premiered on April 3, 2025, on Amazon Prime Video.

== Reception ==
On the review aggregator website Rotten Tomatoes, The Bondsman has an approval rating of 83% based on 29 critics' reviews. The website's critics consensus reads, "Gruesome enough to induce giggles and riding on Kevin Bacon's devilish charm, The Bondsman tracks down the horror comedy goods in scruffy style." Metacritic, which uses a weighted average, assigned a score of 57 out of 100, based on 10 critics, indicating "mixed or average" reviews.
