= Shane Atkinson (director) =

American director and screenwriter

- Born: Northern California, US
- Education: Columbia University
- Occupations: Director; Screenwriter
- Years active: 2010-present
- Notable work: LaRoy, Texas

Shane Atkinson is an American screenwriter and film director, best known for his first feature film LaRoy, Texas, which was awarded three prizes at the 49th Deauville American Film Festival.

== Biography ==
=== Early life and education ===
Bambi Meets Godzilla (1969)

Shane Atkinson was born and raised in Northern California, where he is the eldest of six children. At a very young age, his father showed him the animated short film Bambi Meets Godzilla by Marv Newland. According to Atkinson, this was his first lesson in writing, because despite the apparent simplicity of the film, it turned out to be funny and effective for him. "Probably the most perfect film I have ever seen," he said during the promotion of LaRoy, Texas.

At Columbia University in New York, he wrote his first screenplays, which earned him a scholarship, and he obtained a Master's degree in Directing and Screenwriting. In 2010, he was selected for the Nickelodeon Writing Fellowship. Two years later, he won the Columbia University Screenwriting Competition.

Shane Atkinson appeared in 2012 on The Tracking Board's list of the top 100 emerging screenwriters of the year. The same year his thesis screenplay Penny Dreadful appeared on The Black List, a list that highlights the best unproduced screenplays.

=== Career beginnings and initial successes ===
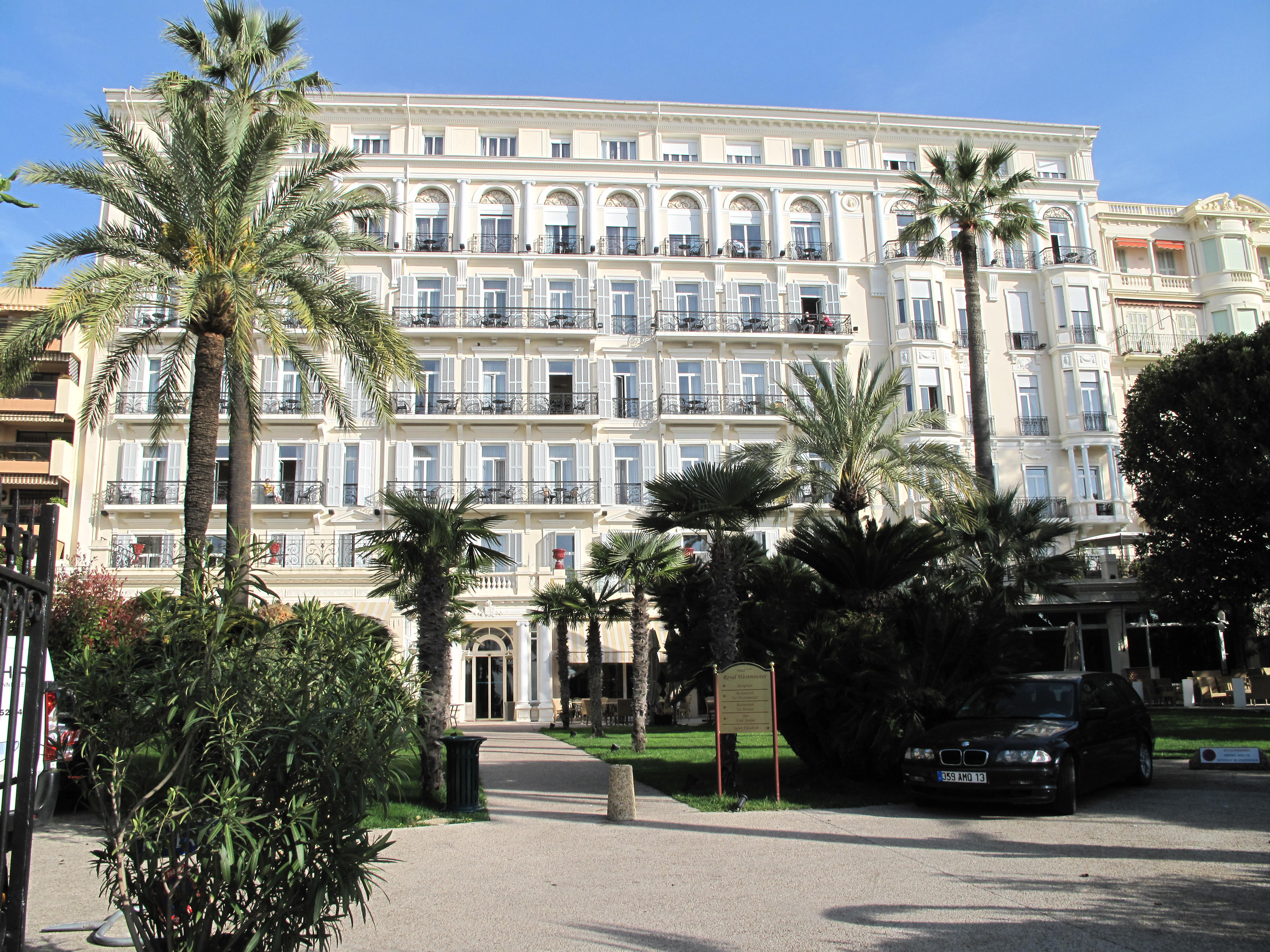
Royal Westminster Hotel in Menton

Upon graduating from university, Shane Atkinson decided to make a short film based on his screenplay Penny Dreadful. The shooting lasted six days in November 2012, and the film premiered at the Clermont-Ferrand International Short Film Festival in February 2013. There, the film won the Audience Award, and Atkinson met Sebastien Aubert from the French production company Adastra Films, with whom he would go on to make his next films. In May 2014, Penny Dreadful won the Best Crime Fiction by SNCF and was later broadcast on France Télévisions.

In 2018, Shane Atkinson wrote and directed The ambassador, produced by Adastra Films and shot on the French Riviera, partly at the Royal Westminster Hotel in Menton. The film was broadcast on France 2 in 2019 during the Histoires Courtes evenings.

In 2019, he began his career as a feature film screenwriter with Poms, directed by Zara Hayes, starring Diane Keaton, Jacki Weaver, and Pam Grier. The film was released in theaters in the United States on May 10, 2019, and in France on Netflix on September 25, 2021.

=== Recognition at Deauville ===
After The ambassador, Shane Atkinson embarked on his first feature film project. A fan of hardboiled novels and films, he decided to adapt this genre for his movie. He wrote the script in three months, and the film began development in 2018. In 2020, during the COVID-19 pandemic, pre-production was paused, delaying filming to 2022. Initially cast in the film, Jared Harris was eventually replaced by Dylan Baker, who joined John Magaro and Steve Zahn in the lead roles. Filming took place in New Mexico over 22 days, with post-production occurring in Cannes

LaRoy, Texas premiered at the Tribeca Film Festival in June 2023, then triumphed at the Deauville American Film Festival in September of the same year, winning the Grand Prize, the Audience Award, and the Critics Award

In an interview given in April 2024, during the Reims Polar Festival, Shane Atkinson announced that he is working on his next film, a crime thriller that will be shot in France.

== Filmography ==
=== As director ===
- 2009 : La Grande Maladie (short film)
- 2013 : Penny Dreadful (short film)
- 2018 : The ambassador (short film)
- 2023 : LaRoy, Texas

=== As screenwriter ===
- 2009 : La Grande Maladie (short film)
- 2013 : Penny Dreadful (short film)
- 2014 : After We Rest (short film)
- 2015 : All Hail King Julien (S2.E7)
- 2018 : The ambassador (short film)
- 2019 : Poms
- 2023 : LaRoy, Texas
