= Vincent Diderot =

French film director

Vincent Diderot (born 28 October 1980, Toulouse, France) is a French film director.

== Biography ==
After graduating in visual and performing Arts, he devoted himself to short film directing. Influenced by the painters Jackson Pollock, Jean-Michel Basquiat and Francis Bacon, as well as by the film directors David Lynch, Stanley Kubrick, Tim Burton, Terry Gilliam, his first short films, Louise and Sirène, are experimental.

Diderot is especially known for his short film La Révélation (The Revelation) distributed by ADASTRA Films and broadcast on Canal+ in the TV show Mickrociné in 2009. It was selected for more than 50 festivals, amongst which were the Fantasia Festival, Utopiales, Fantastisk Filmfestival, Ankara International Film Festival, and Off-courts. It won 'The Best Short Science Fiction Award' at the Cinefantasy Film Festival, as well as 'The Jury Special Mention' at The Festival Video of Orléans.

The film is also part of the DVD, Destination Mars, edited by Artus Films.

== Filmography ==
- Louise (2005)
- Sirène (2006)
- La Révélation (2008)
- Jour 0 (2010)
