= The Strange Ones =

- Theatrical release poster
- Directed by: Christopher Radcliff; Lauren Wolkstein
- Screenplay by: Christopher Radcliff
- Story by: Christopher Radcliff; Lauren Wolkstein
- Produced by: Sébastien Aubert; Shani Geva; Michael Prall; Eric Schultz; Daniela Taplin Lundberg
- Starring: Alex Pettyfer; James Freedson-Jackson; Emily Althaus; Gene Jones; Owen Campbell; Tobias Campbell
- Cinematography: Todd Banhazl
- Edited by: Christopher Radcliff; Lauren Wolkstein
- Production companies: ADASTRA Films; Archer Gray; Gamechanger Films; Relic Pictures; Stay Gold Features; Storyboard Entertainment
- Distributed by: Vertical Entertainment
- Release dates: March 11, 2017 (SXSW); December 7, 2017 (United States)
- Running time: 81 minutes
- Country: United States
- Language: English
- Box office: $28,374

The Strange Ones is a 2017 American thriller drama film directed by Christopher Radcliff and Lauren Wolkstein, and written by Christopher Radcliff. It is a feature-length adaptation of a short film directed by Radcliff and Wolkstein in 2011. The film stars Alex Pettyfer, James Freedson-Jackson, Emily Althaus, Gene Jones, Owen Campbell, and Tobias Campbell. It was released on DirecTV on December 7, 2017, before arriving on video on demand and in theaters on January 5, 2018, released by Vertical Entertainment.

== Plot ==
The film opens as a house fire sends a teenage boy, Sam, and a twenty-something man, Nick, on a road trip across rural America. As they head towards what Nick believes could be a second chance, they tell people at diners and rest stops that they're brothers Nick and Jeremiah and on vacation. Seeming jealousy on Sam's part over anyone spending time with Nick soon suggests that a darker relationship exists between the two males. Sam has difficulty interpreting the difference between reality and dreams. Nick tells him that it doesn't matter and that Sam can turn his dreams into reality.

== Cast ==
- Alex Pettyfer as Nick
- James Freedson-Jackson as Sam
- Emily Althaus as Kelly
- Gene Jones as Gary
- Owen Campbell as Luke
- Tobias Campbell as Jeremiah
- Marin Ireland as Crystal
- Will Blomker as Robert
- Birgit Huppuch as Dr. Faller
- Olivia Wang as Sarah

== Production ==
The Strange Ones is based on a 2011 short film of the same name co-directed by Wolkstein and Radcliffe. The short centers on a man and young boy who arouse suspicion from others at a roadside motel. It features David Call, Tobias Campbell (who appears in the full-length film), and Merritt Wever.

== Release ==
The film premiered at South by Southwest on March 11, 2017. On May 20, 2017, Vertical Entertainment and DirecTV acquired distribution rights to the film. The film was released on DirecTV on December 7, 2017, before its release on video on demand and in theaters on January 5, 2018, by Vertical Entertainment.

== Reception ==
On review aggregator website Rotten Tomatoes, the film holds an approval rating of 57% based on 28 reviews, with an average rating of 5.70/10. On Metacritic, the film has a weighted average score of 57 out of 100, based on 10 critics, indicating "mixed or average reviews".

David Edelstein of New York wrote the film "is a perfect demonstration of how the craft of storytelling is also the craft of withholding - of revealing as little as possible in carefully parceled-out amounts." Matt Zoller Seitz of RogerEbert.com described it as "One of those take-it-or-leave it movies where you either surrender completely to the mood and style of the filmmaking or start questioning what it's leaving out, covering up, or glossing over."
