= Brides (2014 film) =

- Film poster
- Directed by: Tinatin Kajrishvili
- Written by: Tinatin Kajrishvili
- Produced by: Tinatin Kajrishvili, Sébastien Aubert, Suliko Tsulukidze, Lasha Khalvashi
- Starring: Mari Kitia, Giorgi Maskharashvili, Giorgi Makharadze, Darejan Khachidze, Tamar Mamulashvili, Anuka Grigolia, Nita Kalichava
- Cinematography: Goga Devdariani
- Edited by: David Guiraud
- Music by: Rim Laurens
- Production companies: Gemini, Millimeter Film and ADASTRA Films
- Release date: 9 February 2014 (Berlinale)
- Running time: 94 minutes
- Countries: Georgia; France
- Language: Georgian

Brides (Georgian: პატარძლები; transliterated Patardzlebi) is a 2014 Georgian-French film directed by Tinatin Kajrishvili. and produced by Gemini, Millimeter Films and ADASTRA Films.

In her feature film debut Tinatin Kajrishvili shows the daily routine of a woman whose partner is in prison. The film is about human dignity and the repressive judicial system in Georgia.

The film had its world premiere at the 64th Berlin International Film Festival in the Panorama section and won the 3rd Place Panorama Audience Award – Fiction Film 2014. It has also been selected for the official competition (World Narrative Competition) of Tribeca Film Festival. Main actress Mari Kitia received the Special Jury Prize for Best Actress at the Sarajevo Film Festival, and the movie was given 3 awards at the Scarborough Worldwide Film Festival, including the Outstanding Directorial Achievement Award.

The film was supported by the Georgian National Film Center and the French National Center of Cinematography and the moving image.

== Plot ==
Nutsa, a young mother, lives with her two children in a suburbs of Tbilisi in Georgia. Her partner Goga is in prison. They get married, so she gains the right to talk to him once a month in the visiting room on the other side of the glass. The ceremony is quick with a strange ambiance. Goga in prison, Nutsa with children outside, a routine sets in.

== Cast ==
- Mari Kitia
- Giorgi Maskharashvili
- Giorgi Makharadze
- Darejan Khachidze
- Tamar Mamulashvili
- Anuka Grigolia.
- nita kalichava

== Festivals ==
Awards :

- 64th Berlin International Film Festival - Panorama Section

Third audience award
Special Jury Prize

- Sarajevo Film Festival (Bosnia and Herzegovina)

Special Jury Prize
Heart of Sarajevo for Best Actress for Mari Kitia

- Batumi Summer Theater Film Festival (Georgia)

Special Jury Prize

- Scarborough Worldwide Film Festival (Canada)

Audience Choice Award
Outstanding Directorial Achievement
Outstanding Achievement in Cinematography

Selections :

- 64th Berlin International Film Festival - Panorama Section (Germany) - 2014
- Tribeca Film Festival (United States)- 2014
- Mooov International Film Festival (Belgium) - 2014
- Off Plus Camera (Poland) - 2014
- Busan International Film Festival (South Korea) - 2014
- Five Lakes Film Festival (Germany) - 2014
- Milano Film Festival (Italy) - 2014
- BFI London Film Festival (United Kingdom) - 2014
- Sarajevo Film Festival (Bosnia and Herzegovina) - 2014
- Festival do Rio (Brazil) - 2014
- Stockholm International Film Festival (Sweden) - 2014
- Cabourg Film Festival (France)- 2015
- Romania International Film Festival (Romania)- 2015
- Vox Feminae Film Festival (Croatia) - 2015
- Women in Film, Los Angeles (United States) - 2016
- Vancouver International Film Festival (Canada) - 2016
