= Adastra Films =

French film production and distribution company

- Industry: Film
- Founded: 2008
- Headquarters: Cannes, France
- Key people: Sébastien Aubert; David Guiraud
- Products: Short movies, feature-length movie, animation films, documentaries
- Website: adastra-films.com/en/ films06.com/en/

Adastra Films is a film production and distribution company based in Cannes, France. It was founded in March 2008 by Sébastien Aubert and David Guiraud. It produces movies by French and international directors.

== History ==
The company owns a catalogue composed of awarded short films, such as The Strange Ones or Social Butterfly, selected in famous festivals (Sundance Film Festival, South by Southwest (SXSW), Palm Springs International Film Festival, Clermont-Ferrand International Short Film Festival...) and often broadcast on national TV channels (Canal+, France 2, France 3, RTP2.

In 2014, the company produced its first full-length movie called Brides (2014 film), selected in the Panorama Section of the 64th Berlin International Film Festival among movies such as Yves Saint Laurent (film) and famous directors, such as Michel Gondry, or Tsai Ming-liang.

In 2014, Adastra Films received "The Award for Best Emerging Producer in France 2014 by France Télévisions", and in 2015 during the Cannes Film Festival, it was part of the "Futur Leaders 2015: Producers" list, made by Screen Daily Magazine.

Its second feature film The Strange Ones starring Alex Pettyfer and James Jackson-Freedson is a French- American co-production with Stay Gold Features, Relic Pictures in association with Archer Gray, Gamechanger Films and Storyboard Entertainment. In 2017 the film won the Jury Prize at the Champs-Élysées Film Festival and was part of the official selection of South by Southwest where the actor James Jackson-Freedson won the Best Breakthrough performance.

Sébastien Aubert was captivated by the short film Domingo, which was then selected at the Biarritz Film Festival in 2015. He offered its director to adapt the story into a feature film, and 4 years later, the shooting took place in a favela in Guadalajara, Mexico, where the director is from. The film was financed by a group of independent investors. Post-production took place at the Label 42 studio in Marseille. The film was selected for the 2021 Toronto International Film Festival and won the Made in Jalisco award at the 36th edition of the Guadalajara International Film Festival the same year. It is distributed in the United States by Samuel Goldwyn Films and internationally by Picture Tree International. The film was added to the catalog of Tubi, an American video-on-demand platform, in September 2021.

In August 2020, Adastra Films began shooting Heartbeast. The shoot took place primarily on the French Riviera, under strict COVID-19 measures. It is Finnish director Aino Suni's first feature film, co-produced between France, Germany, and Finland, with a budget of 1.3 million euros. The film had its world premiere at the 2022 Göteborg International Film Festival, where it was nominated among the best Nordic films. At the 2023 Jussi Awards, the Finnish equivalent of the American Oscars, the film was nominated in four categories and won Best Cinematography and Best Music.

In September 2023, the film LaRoy, Texas, directed by Shane Atkinson and produced by Adastra Films, won the Grand Prize, the Audience Award, and the Critics' Award at the Deauville American Film Festival. The film, shot in New Mexico with a budget of two million dollars, features a cast including John Magaro, Steve Zahn, and Dylan Baker. Sébastien Aubert and the director met at the Clermont-Ferrand International Short Film Festival in 2013, where Shane Atkinson was presenting Penny Dreadful, a short film that left a strong impression on Sébastien Aubert. LaRoy, Texas was released in French movie theaters in April 2024 and attracted over 67,000 viewers in nine weeks.

At the end of 2023, the filming of In the Name of Blood, the first film by Franco-Georgian director Akaki Popkhadze, took place in Nice. The film, produced by Adastra Films and starring Nicolas Duvauchelle, Denis Lavant, and Finnegan Oldfield, has a budget of 3 million euros. The film had its world premiere at the San Sebastian International Film Festival in September 2024 and is set to be released in French cinemas on January 8, 2025.

== Production ==
=== Feature films ===
- 2014: Brides directed by Tinatin Kajrishvili
- 2017: The Strange Ones directed by Christopher Radcliff and Lauren Wolkstein
- 2020: Domingo directed by Raul Lopez Echeverria
- 2022: Heartbeast directed by Aino Suni
- 2024: LaRoy, Texas directed by Shane Atkinson
- 2025: In the Name of Blood directed by Akaki Popkhadze

=== Short films ===
- 2008: Le tonneau des Danaïdes directed by David Guiraud
- 2010: I am Agha directed by Muhammard Umar Saeed
- 2010: Jour 0 directed by Vincent Diderot
- 2011: Deux inconnus directed by Christopher Radcliff et Lauren Wolkstein
- 2011: Le nid directed by Tornike Bziava
- 2012: Black Mulberry directed by Gabriel Razmadze
- 2013: Social Butterfly directed by Lauren Wolkstein
- 2013: L'assistante directed by David Guiraud
- 2014: Jonathan's Chest directed by Christopher Radcliff
- 2015: Mine de rien directed by Grzegorz Jaroszuk
- 2015: H recherche F directed by Marina Moshkova
- 2016: Maxiplace directed by Vincent Diderot
- 2016: En proie directed by David Guiraud
- 2018: The Ambassador directed by Shane Atkinson
- 2022: Out of the Fog directed by Tigrane Minassian

== Short Film Distribution ==
- 2015 : Domingo, directed by Raúl López Echeverría (Mexico)
- 2015 : Pitter Patter, Goes My Heart directed by Christoph Rainer (Austria, Germany, USA)
- 2015 : Two Sisters, directed by Keola Racela (United States)
- 2015 : Jackie, directed by Giedrius Tamoševičius (Lithuania)
- 2015 : Midland, directed by Oliver Bernsen (United States)
- 2014 : Beach Flags, directed by Sarah Saïdan (Iran/France)
- 2013 : La Fugue, directed by Jean-Bernard Marlin, (France)
- 2012 : Penny Dreadful, directed by Shane Atkinson (United States)
- 2012 : Bad Toys 2, directed by Daniel Brunet & Nicolas Douste (France)
- 2012 : Frozen Stories, directed by Grzegorz Jaroszuk (Poland)
- 2012 : Wolf Carver, directed by Aino Suni (Finland)
- 2010 : Tasnim, directed by Elite Zexer (Israël)
- 2010 : The April Chill, directed by Tornike Bziava (Georgia)
- 2009 : Helpless, directed by Li Yang (China)
- 2009 : Cigarette Candy, directed by Lauren Wolkstein (United States)
- 2009 : Ma Poubelle Géante, directed by Uda Benyamina (France)
- 2009 : La Révélation, directed by Vincent Diderot (France)

== Awards and selections ==
2009 : In Scale (aka V Mashtabe)

Over 20 awards including :

- GOLDEN FISH at VauFest International Video Art & Short Film Festival
- Best animation movie at PLANETE DOC FILM FESTIVAL
- Special Jury Award and RTP2 Award at CINANIMA Film Festival
- Best animation Award at Sapporo International Short Film Festival

Over 80 selections including :

- Festival International du court-métrage de Lille
- Tofifest International Film Festival
- Alpinale Short Film Festival Nenzing

2011 : The Strange Ones (aka Deux Inconnus)

In 2013, the movie was nominated for the "Lutins du court métrage ", a French reward for the best fictions of the year. The Strange Ones was among the 17th best French fictions of the year.

Over 20 awards including :

- Best short movie and "Golden Starfish Price" at Hamptons International Film Festival
- Best fiction short movie at Atlanta Film Festival (Festival Oscar list)
- Special Jury Award at Filmets - Badalona Film Festival
- Revelation Award at the Brest European Short Film Festival

Over 100 selections including :

- World premiere in 2011 at Sundance Film Festival, founded by Robert Redford
- Clermont-Ferrand International Short Film Festival
- South by Southwest
- Melbourne International Film Festival
- Chicago International Film Festival
- San Francisco International Film Festival
- Woodstock Film Festival

TV Broadcasting :

- France 2 "Histoires Courtes"

2012 : Black Mulberry (aka Shavi Tuta)

Awards :

- Grand Jury Mention at the Festival du court métrage en plein air de Grenoble

Over 30 selections including :

- Sundance Film Festival
- Uppsala (Out of Competition)
- Palm Springs International Festival of Short Films
- Short Shorts Film Festival
- Cork Film Festival
- Rhode Island International Film Festival
- Festival Côté Court
- IFF Molodist
- Odense International Film Festival

2012 : Social Butterfly

Awards including :

- Best short fiction movie at Oak Cliff Film Festival
- Best short movie at Victoria TX Independent Film Festival

Over 30 selections including :

- World premiere in 2013 at Sundance Film Festival
- South by Southwest (SXSW)
- Palm Springs International Festival of Short Films
- Atlanta Film Festival
- Curtas Vila do Conde
- Independent Film Festival of Boston
- Maryland Film Festival

2014 : Jonathan's Chest

First selection :

- World premiere in 2014 at Sundance Film Festival

2022 : Out of the Fog

Over 20 selections :

- World Premiere in 2022 at Clermont-Ferrand International Short Film Festival

TV Broadcasting :

- France 2 "Histoires Courtes"

2022 : Heartbeast

Awards :

- Best Cinematography and Best Music in 2023 at Jussi Awards

2024 : LaRoy, Texas

Awards :

- Grand Special Prize, Audience Award, Critics Award in 2023 at Deauville American Film Festival
- World Premiere in 2023 at Tribeca Film Festival

== Films 06 ==
=== Clips and advertising ===
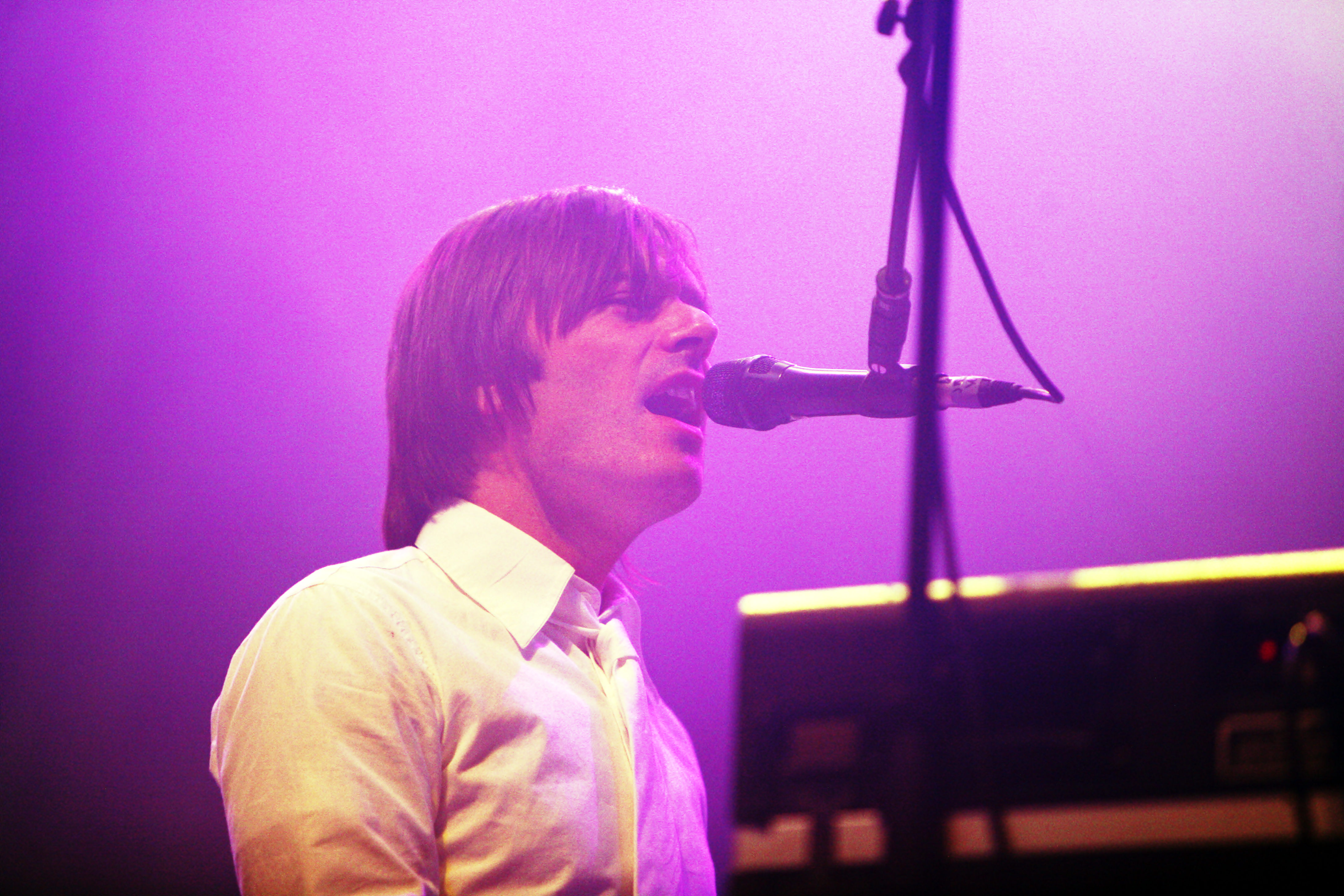
JB Dunckel performing in 2010 as one half of Air

Films 06 is an advertising and video agency, a brand of the company Adastra Films. In 2015, Films 06 produced the music video Jeune fille trois étoiles for JB Dunckel, from the band Air. The video was filmed at Villa Domergue in Cannes in 360°, and can be viewed with a virtual reality headset.

In 2021, Xiaomi hired Films 06 for the launch of its new smartphone, the Xiaomi Mi11. The agency directed a 25-minute video for the brand titled Le futur en avant-première (The Future in preview), filmed at the Museum of Asian Arts in Nice, which was viewed more than 3 million times within a week.

=== Recognition for Cannes 360 ===
In 2018, for the Palais des Festivals and the Cannes City Hall, Films 06 created the Cannes 360 app. This app allows users to virtually visit the Palais des Festivals and the old town of Cannes through immersive 360° videos.

This 360° tourism app concept won the Regional Prize '10,000 Startups to Change the World' (organized by BNP and La Tribune), as well as the Silver Dolphin at the Cannes Corporate Media & TV Awards.
