= Rhode Island International Film Festival =

US film festival

- Location: Providence, USA
- Founded: 1981
- Website: film-festival.org

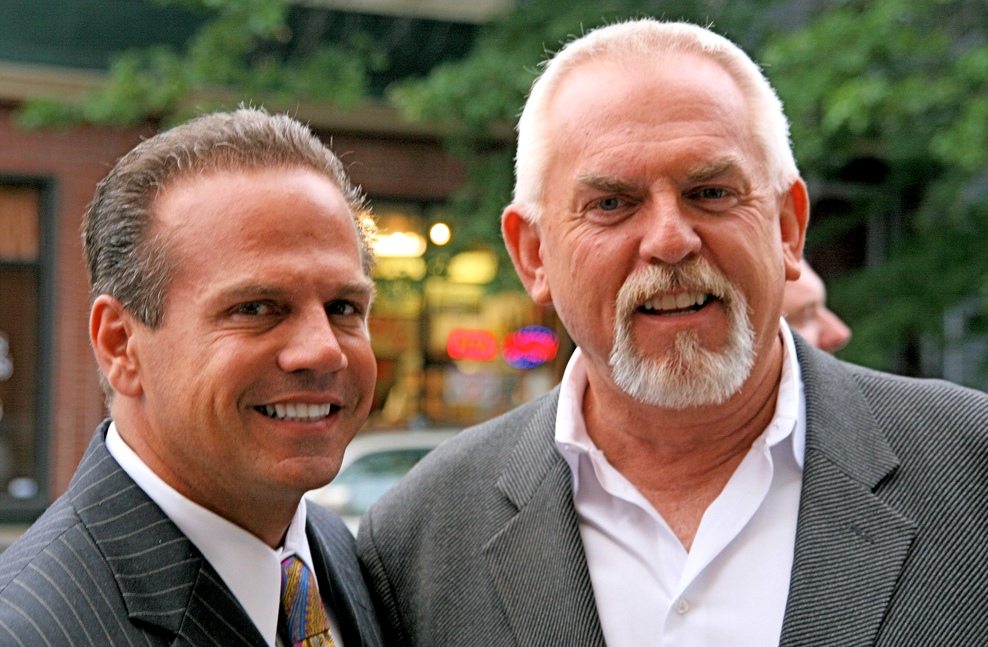
David Cicilline and John Ratzenberger at the 2008 Rhode Island Film Festival

Flickers' Rhode Island International Film Festival (RIIFF) takes place every year in Providence and Newport, Rhode Island, U.S., as well as satellite locations throughout the state.

Started in 1997, the Festival is produced by Flickers, the Newport Film/Video Society & Arts Collaborative, a 501(c)(3) non-profit created in 1981. The festival is BAFTA-qualifying for British short films.

== History ==
The Festival was founded by George T. Marshall, who is also the founder of the Flickers Arts Collaborative. He has been serving as the Executive Director/CEO of the Festival since its inception. Shawn Quirk is the Programming Director, and J. Scott Oberacker is the Educational Outreach Director. Timothy Haggerty is the Technical Director, while Katie Reaves, Mary McSally, and Reshad Kulenovic serve as the Educational Program Directors. Lawrence J. Andrade acts as the Executive Advisor and Human Resource Director, and Michael Drywa is the board president.

In 1998, it hosted the world premiere of the Farrelly brothers film, There's Something About Mary. The Festival draws over 45,000 people annually along with a strong filmmaker presence attending its main event each August and its Horror Film sidebar in October. In 2018, the Festival screened 295 films; with 84 being world and US premieres.

In 2010, the Festival has been designated as the host for Oscar Night America in Rhode Island, which it continues to host each year. In 2014, that event was renamed the "Red Carpet Experience: Providence," and continues annually.

The festival often attracts major industry talent and celebrities who attend to participate in conversations about varied aspects of filmmaking.

Attending filmmakers in the past have included actor Andrew McCarthy, who premiered his directorial debut, News for the Church; Michael Showalter discussing his feature film The Baxter, and actors Seymour Cassel, Kim Chan, and Ernest Borgnine (2009) who received Festival Lifetime Achievement Awards.

Director Blake Edwards received a Festival Lifetime Achievement Award in 2001, which was accepted by his wife, actress/singer, Julie Andrews.

Actress Blythe Danner received the Festival's Creative Vision Award in 2008 for "significant contributions to the arts." That same year, actor Richard Jenkins received the George M. Cohan Ambassador Award which honors "unique Americans who have made a timeless contribution to the arts and have inspired future generations of Rhode Islanders."

In 2009, film composer Klaus Badelt was awarded the Festival's Crystal Image Award for his contribution to the art of filmmaking. In 2010, the award went to children's author/filmmaker, Sandra Boynton. In 2011, the Lifetime Achievement Award was presented to actors Paul Sorvino and Ken Howard. In 2014, the Award was presented to actor/artist, Theo Bikel.

In 2017, the Award was renamed the Gilbert Stuart Artistic Vision Lifetime Achievement Award and presented to special effects creator, Douglas Trumbull. In 2018, the Award was presented to production designer, Joseph M. Alves.

Sidebar events for the Festival include the KidsEye International Film Festival, the RI International Horror Film Festival, the Vortex Sci-Fi and Fantasy Film Festival, Cine ¡Ole! (Spanish Film Series), the Golden Jasmine Chinese Film Festival, the Roving Eye International Film Festival, the Annual Flickers' Japanese Film Festival, the Providence Underground Film Festival and the First Look Series. Educational programs include the KidsEye Summer Filmmaking Workshop (started in 1998), the Youth Film Jury, ScriptBiz, the Providence LGBTQ Film Festival, and the Rhode Island Film Forum.

In 2010, the Flickers North Country Film Festival was introduced as a companion event to the annual RIIFF. The location for the Festival is in Coos County, New Hampshire. The principal location for exhibition is at the Balsams Grand Hotel Resort in Dixville Notch, New Hampshire. Programming took place in late September through early October. In 2011, the event moved to Brattleboro, Vermont and was held in collaboration with the Brattleboro Retreat.

In 2010, the Festival introduced three new outreach programs that were designed to reach beyond the Rhode Island border: the 7DayPSA Competition and the New England Film Festival Alliance. In 2017, the Flickers introduced a new program geared to youngsters confined to hospitals called the Children's Hospital International Film Festival.

In 2016, Nobody Dies Here won the First Jury Prize for Best Documentary.

In 2022, the Festival's founder George T. Marshall died three months after the 40th annual edition of the Festival.

The Festival is berthed at The Vets (formerly the VMA Arts & Cultural Center), a 1,900-seat facility located at One Avenue of the Arts in Providence and presents screenings throughout the state of Rhode Island during the year.
