= Lauren Wolkstein =

American film director

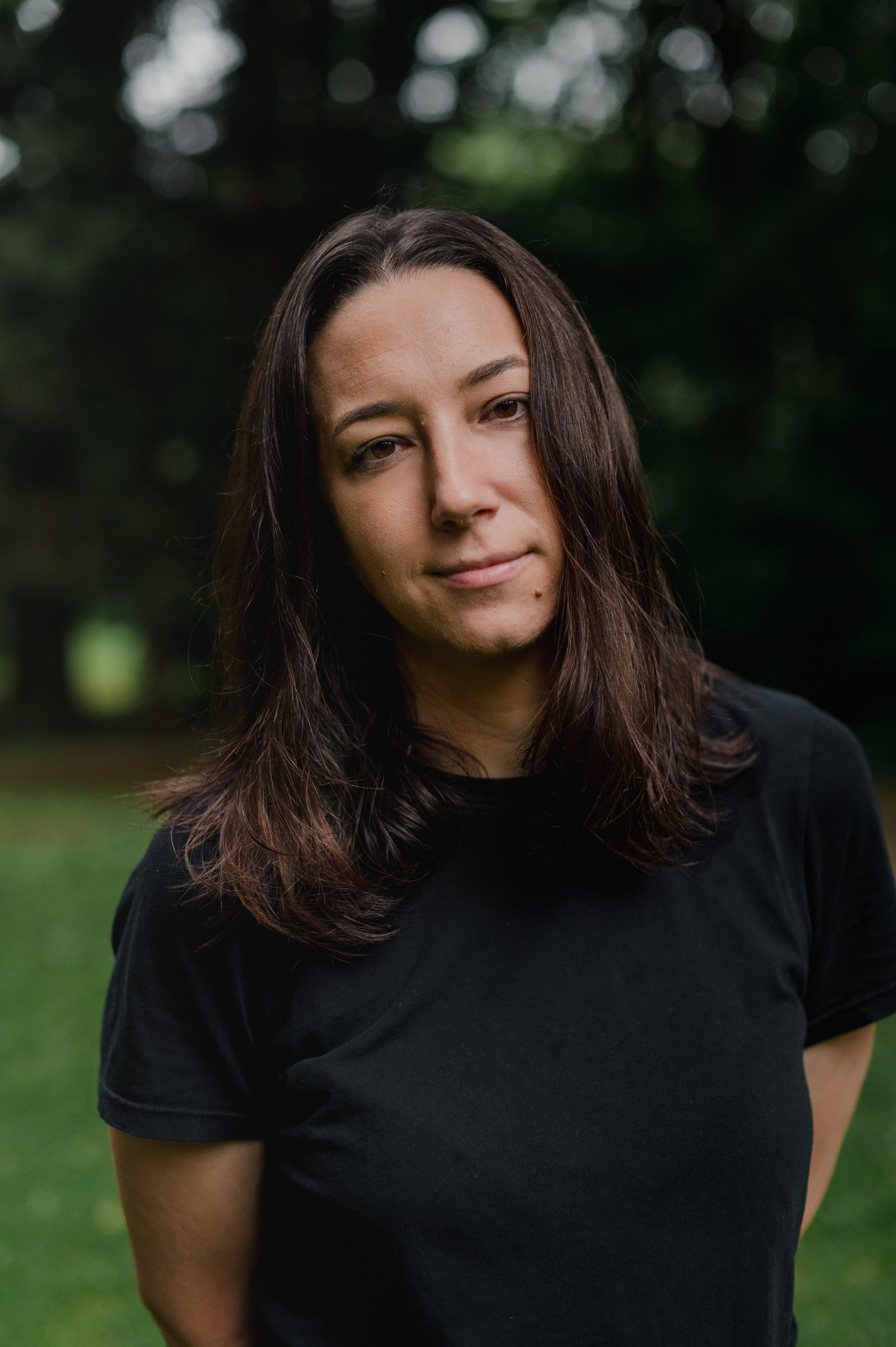
- Lauren Wolkstein in June 2021
- Born: 1982 (age 43–44); Baltimore, Maryland, U.S.
- Education: Duke University (BA); Columbia University (MFA)
- Occupations: Director, writer, producer, editor
- Website: Official website

Lauren Wolkstein is an American film director, writer, producer and editor. She is known for directing, writing, and editing the 2017 film The Strange Ones with Christopher Radcliff and serving on the directorial team for the third season of Ava DuVernay's Queen Sugar, which she followed with a producing director role in the fifth season. She was a tenured Associate Professor of Film and Media Arts at Temple University in Philadelphia. She is currently Assistant Professor of Screenwriting (tenure-track) in the School of Film and Television at Loyola Marymount University in Los Angeles.

== Early life and education ==
Wolkstein was born and raised in Baltimore, Maryland. She is the daughter of a schoolteacher and an Air Force Colonel. Wolkstein has written that John Waters, David Lynch and Lukas Moodysson were early inspirations for her film career. She earned a Bachelor of Arts in Computer Science and Film from Duke University, and won a Duke Undergraduate Filmmaker Award. In 2010, she completed a Masters of Fine Arts in Directing from Columbia University. She has said at Columbia, she "fell in love with filmmakers like Hal Ashby and Nicholas Ray, who had a sensitivity to outsiders, odd couple pairings, and people on the fringes.”

== Career ==
Wolkstein's Columbia University thesis film, Cigarette Candy, based on the experiences of her father as an Air Force colonel, won the Short Film Jury Award for Best Narrative Short at the 2010 SXSW Film Festival. In 2011, she co-directed the short The Strange Ones with Christopher Radcliff, which was described by Filmmaker as "a brilliantly unsettling drama about two travelers, a man and a boy, who create fear at a roadside motel." In 2011, she was named as one of 25 emerging filmmakers in the Emerging Visions program by the Film Society of Lincoln Center and Independent Filmmaker Project. Her next film, Social Butterfly, premiered at the 2013 Sundance Film Festival. In 2013, Wolkstein was named one of 25 "New Faces of Independent Film" by Filmmaker.

Wolkstein directed and wrote the screenplay for Beemus, It’ll End in Tears, a short included in the 2016 omnibus film collective:unconscious that was written with a premise described by The New York Times as "Five filmmakers transcribed their dreams; each description was then given at random to one of the others to direct as a short." Sean L. Malin writes for The Austin Chronicle, "the five dream-renderings are unanimously virtuosic, especially those like Decker’s, Wolkstein’s, and Baldwin’s, that called for Lubezki-level single-shot photography." Chuck Bowen writes for Slant Magazine that the film directed by Wolkstein "revels in the potential cleaning of an authoritarian slate, using nightmarishly symmetric imagery to relate a tale of a masculine hierarchy turned upside down by apocalypse."

In 2017, Wolkstein and Radcliff adapted their 2011 short The Strange Ones into the feature-length film The Strange Ones. Katie Walsh at Los Angeles Times described the film as "an artful, boundary-pushing debut from Radcliff and Wolkstein," and Sheri Linden at The Hollywood Reporter wrote, "Christopher Radcliff and Lauren Wolkstein demonstrate an undeniable mastery of mood." Eric Kohn at IndieWire writes, "Eventually, the feature-length debut of co-directors Christopher Radcliff and Lauren Wolkstein reveals all its cards, and the full picture of this brief tone poem doesn’t match the level of engagement generated early on. But its atmospheric sophistication holds strong throughout, channeling a wonder for the natural world reminiscent of Terrence Malick with an air of existential dread straight out of Andrei Tarkovsky." Matt Zoeller Seitz at RogerEbert.com described the film as a "frustratingly fractured but still-haunting drama from the filmmaking team of Christopher Radcliff and Lauren Wolkstein." Andrew Lapin at NPR writes, "this may not be fair to the directors, but the film's two best conceits have been done better elsewhere," and Variety described it as a "ponderously opaque and tediously elliptical drama." Leah Pickett writes for Chicago Reader, "cowriter-directors Lauren Wolkstein and Christopher Radcliff, expanding on a 2011 short, seem more concerned with building an eerie mood around the boy than with revealing what actually happened to him." David Edelstein writes for Vulture that the film is "a perfect demonstration of how the craft of storytelling is also the craft of withholding — of revealing as little as possible in carefully parceled-out amounts," and "Radcliff and Wolkstein maintain an atmosphere of paranoia and dread by what they don’t do." Sean L. Malin writes for The Austin Chronicle, "Wolkstein’s and Radcliff’s direction and editing only extend outward in technical excellence from the actors with a tight orbit of handsome visual and aural contributions," and Andy Crump writes for Paste, "Radcliff and Wolkstein’s approach to editing and filming lends an eerie cadence to their picture, looping from day to night to morning with a tempo that’s as natural as it is thoroughly spooky." John Waters named it one of the best films of 2017.

Wolkstein was a 2017-2018 Women at Sundance fellow, and her films have screened at a variety of festivals, including Cannes Film Festival, Outfest LGBT Film Festival, Sundance Film Festival, and SXSW.

In 2018, Wolkstein began her work with Ava DuVernay's Queen Sugar, joining the directing team in Season 3, and becoming a directing producer for Season 5, in which she directed 5 episodes. In 2021, Wolkstein directed an episode of the American drama television series Y: The Last Man. Wolkstein has also directed episodes of Cloak & Dagger, Dare Me, and The Bondsman.

== Filmography ==
=== Short film ===
Year	Title	Director	Writer	Producer	Editor	Ref(s)
2005	Coney Island Catch	Yes	Yes	Yes	Yes	
2007	Dandelion Fall	Yes	Yes	No	No	
2007	Love Crimes	Yes	Yes	Yes	Yes	
2009	Cigarette Candy	Yes	No	No	Yes	
2011	The Strange Ones	Yes	Yes	No	Yes	
2013	Social Butterfly	Yes	Yes	No	Yes	
2014	Jonathan’s Chest	No	No	Yes	Yes	
2016	Beemus, It’ll End in Tears in collective: unconscious	Yes	Yes	No	Yes	

=== Feature film ===
Year	Title	Director	Writer	Editor	Ref.
2017	The Strange Ones	Yes	Yes	Yes	

=== Television ===
Year	Title	Episode	Role	Ref(s)
2018	Queen Sugar	Season 3, Episode 3: Your Distant Destiny	Director	
2019	Cloak & Dagger	Season 2, Episode 6: B Sides	Director	
2020	Dare Me	Season 1, Episode 3: Surrender at Discretion	Director	
2021	Queen Sugar	Season 5, All episodes	Producer	
2021	Queen Sugar	Season 5, Episode 1: Late-February 2020	Director	
2021	Queen Sugar	Season 5, Episode 3: Late-April 2020	Director	
2021	Queen Sugar	Season 5, Episode 5: May 19, 2020	Director	
2021	Queen Sugar	Season 5, Episode 9: In Summer Time to Simply Be	Director	
2021	Queen Sugar	Season 5, Episode 10: Onward	Director	
2021	Y: The Last Man	Season 1, Episode 7: "My Mother Saw a Monkey"	Director	
2022	A Friend of the Family	Season 1, Episode 9: "Revelation"	Director	
2023	Dead Ringers	Season 1, Episode 4: "Four"	Director	
2023	Dead Ringers	Season 1, Episode 6: "Six"	Co-Director	
2025	The Bondsman	Season 1, Episode 5: "Slypharis"	Director	
2025	The Bondsman	Season 1, Episode 6: "Revelations"	Director	
2026	56 Days	Season 1, Episode 5: "Chapter 5"	Director	
2026	56 Days	Season 1, Episode 6: "Chapter 6"	Director	
2026	Ride or Die	Season 1, Episode 7: "The Geneva Convention"	Director	
2026	The Walking Dead: Dead City	Season 3, Episode 6: "Genesis"	Director	
2026	Life Is Strange	Season 1, Episode 5	Director	
2026	Life Is Strange	Season 1, Episode 7	Director	

== Honors and awards ==
- 2007 Lifetime Movie Network Student Filmmaker Award (We Three)
- 2009 Palm Springs International Festival of Short Films, First place, Student Category, and Special mention (Cigarette Candy)
- 2010 Cleveland International Film Festival, Best Student Short Film (Cigarette Candy)
- 2010 SXSW Film Festival, Short Film Jury Award for Best Narrative Short (Cigarette Candy)
- 2017 - 2018 Sundance Institute, Women at Sundance Fellow
- Summer 2018, MacDowell Fellow
- 2019, Academy of Motion Picture Arts and Sciences, membership

== Personal life ==
Wolkstein is married, and she and her wife have one daughter.
