= Oak Knoll School of the Holy Child =

Catholic school in Summit, New Jersey, US

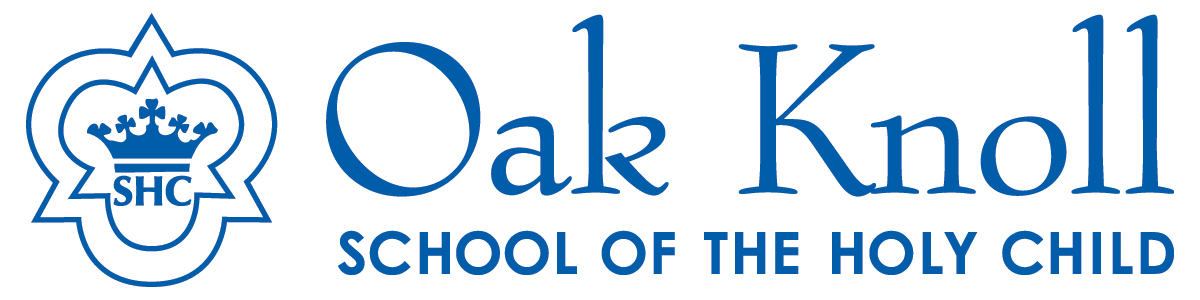
- Logo

Location
- 44 Blackburn Road; Summit, (Union County), New Jersey 07901; United States
- 40°42′36″N 74°22′0″W

Information
- Type: Private, Coeducational PK-6; All-Girls
- Motto: "Actions not words." - Cornelia Connelly
- Religious affiliation: Catholic
- Established: 1924
- Founder: Sisters of the Holy Child Jesus
- Oversight: Society of the Holy Child Jesus
- CEEB code: 311-430
- NCES School ID: 02167374
- Head of school: Jennifer G. Landis
- Faculty: 77.6 FTEs
- Grades: PreK–12
- Enrollment: 498 (plus 7 in PreK, as of 2023–24)
- Student to teacher ratio: 6.4:1
- Colors: Navy blue and Gold
- Athletics conference: Union County Interscholastic Athletic Conference
- Team name: Royals
- Rival: Kent Place School; Summit High School; Villa Walsh Academy
- Accreditation: Middle States Association of Colleges and Schools New Jersey Association of Independent Schools NJAIS
- Publication: Freestyle (literary magazine)
- Newspaper: Untucked
- Yearbook: Aquila
- Tuition: $53,300 (grades 7–12 for 2025–26)
- Website: www.oakknoll.org

Oak Knoll School of the Holy Child is an independent Catholic private school in Summit, in Union County, in the U.S. state of New Jersey. It is coeducational from pre-kindergarten to grade 6 and all-girls for seventh grade to twelfth grade. The school is a member of the international Holy Child Network of Schools, under the supervision of the Society of the Holy Child Jesus. The school has been accredited by the Middle States Association of Colleges and Schools Commission on Elementary and Secondary Schools since 1992. The school is a member of the New Jersey Association of Independent Schools.

As of the 2023–24 school year, the school had an enrollment of 498 students (plus 7 in PreK) and 77.6 classroom teachers (on an FTE basis), for a student–teacher ratio of 6.4:1.

Oak Knoll was founded in 1924 and is one of nine schools in the Holy Child Network of Schools that provides independent Catholic education across the United States. The Sisters of the Holy Child Jesus have also founded schools in England, Ireland, France, Nigeria, and Ghana. All Holy Child schools operate under the Society of the Holy Child Jesus, based in Drexel Hill, Pennsylvania. Oak Knoll shares the goals of the Schools of the Holy Child Jesus.

== History ==
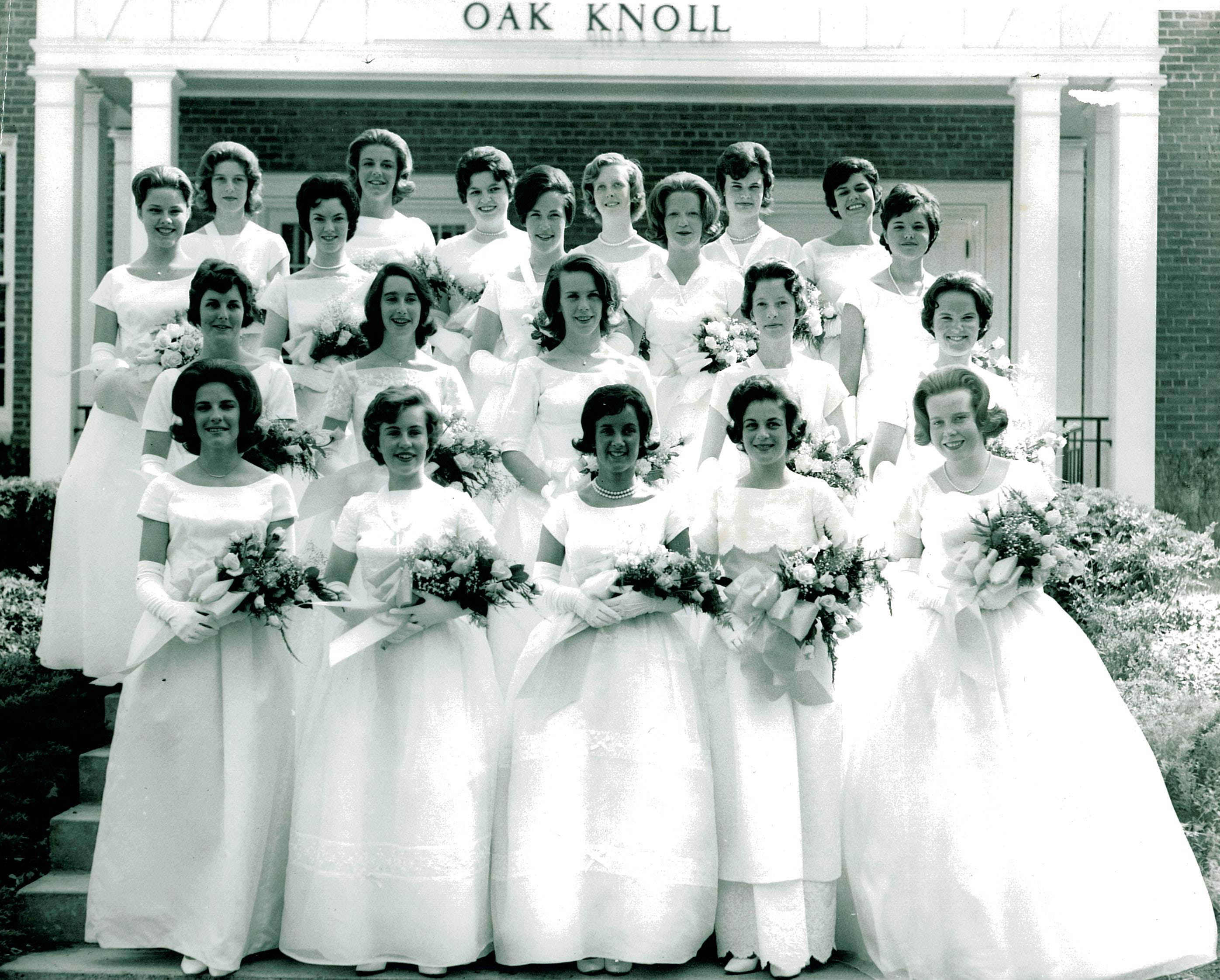

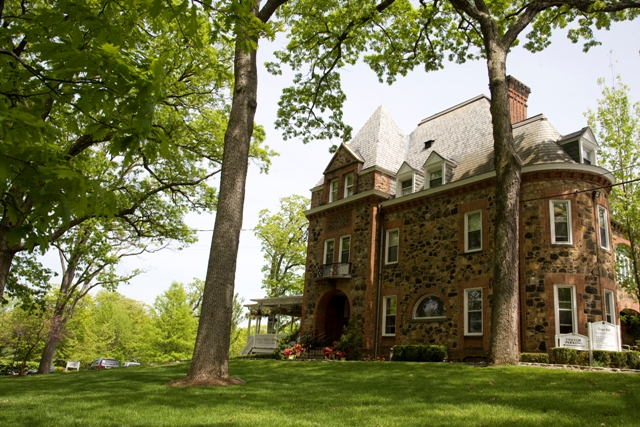

Founded in 1924, Oak Knoll's roots go back to 1846, when Cornelia Connelly founded the Society of the Holy Child Jesus and opened her first school in England. The Provincial Council of the Society of the Holy Jesus responded to a need identified by the Bishop of Newark for a Catholic School for girls. In January 1924, the Society received permission from Rome to open a school in Summit, New Jersey. Several properties were considered, and the estate of William Zebdee Larned was acquired in May 1924.

The 11-acre (45,000 m^{2}) site included the stone manor house, "Stoneover" (now known as "Grace Hall"), built in 1887. A stable, located where Connelly Hall now stands, provided gym and classroom space for the Junior School. Two houses on Prospect Street also contained classrooms and convent space. In 1954, Bonaventura Hall, named after benefactor Bonaventura (Kirby) Devine and her husband Christopher J. Devine a Wall Street banker, was constructed for the elementary grades, and in 1956, construction on the new Upper School, Connelly Hall, was completed.

Renovation and growth characterized the 1990s, with the renovation of the Lower School Library in 1992, addition of the Tisdall Hall athletic complex and expansion of the Upper School Library in 1993, renovation of the Grace Hall Chapel in 1994, completion of the Campion Center for the Performing Arts in 1995, and modernization of the Aileen Maury Dining Hall in 1997. From modest beginnings, numbering just 17 students, Oak Knoll's current enrollment exceeds 500 students.

In 2004, Oak Knoll completed construction of athletic fields, located 5 miles (8.0 km) away in Chatham Township.

Oak Knoll celebrated its centennial in the 2024-25 school year with a Mass at the Cathedral Basilica of the Sacred Heart in Newark, New Jersey, on September 10, 2024. More than 800 people attended the Mass, which was celebrated by His Eminence Joseph William Cardinal Tobin, C.Ss.R.

== Athletics ==
The Oak Knoll School Royals compete in the Union County Interscholastic Athletic Conference, which was established following a reorganization of sports leagues in Northern New Jersey by the New Jersey State Interscholastic Athletic Association (NJSIAA). Prior to the NJSIAA's 2009 realignment, the school had participated in the Mountain Valley Conference, which included public and private high schools in Essex County, Somerset County and Union County. With 396 students in grades 10-12, the school was classified by the NJSIAA for the 2019–20 school year as Non-Public A for most athletic competition purposes, which included schools with an enrollment of 381 to 1,454 students in that grade range (equivalent to Group I for public schools).

Oak Knoll School offers interscholastic sports for students in grades 5 through 12. For students in grades 9-12, Oak Knoll offers 15 varsity and seven junior varsity competitive programs including: cross country, field hockey, soccer, tennis, volleyball, basketball, indoor track, ice hockey, sailing, fencing, swimming, lacrosse, softball, spring track, and golf. For students in grades 7 and 8, Oak Knoll offers: soccer, field hockey, cross country, basketball, lacrosse and non-competitive tennis. For students in grades 5 and 6 Oak Knoll offers: boys soccer, girls field hockey, boys baseball, Intramural, coed basketball, and non-competitive girls lacrosse.

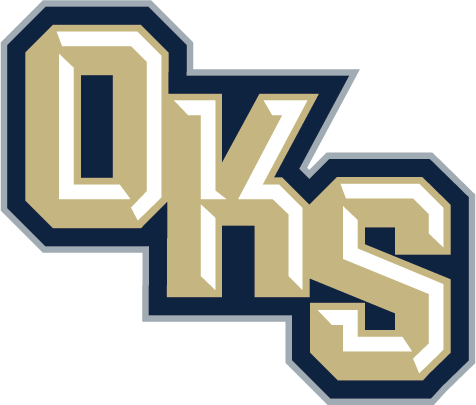

The school was the winner of the 2014-15 ShopRite Cup for Group B, finishing with 113 points, two points ahead of Villa Walsh Academy.

The track team won the indoor track Group I state championship in 1982.

The fencing team won the overall state team championship in 1984 and 2002. The fencing team won the 2002 state championship with 62 wins and 37 losses in the competition, ten wins ahead of Ramapo High School in second place and 17 wins ahead of Millburn High School in third.

The tennis team won the Non-Public Group B state championship in 1987 (defeating Sacred Heart High School), 1988 (vs. Moorestown Friends School), 1989 (vs. Moorestown Friends) and 1999 (vs. St. John Vianney High School).

The field hockey team won the North II Group I state sectional championship in 2006, 2008, 2010, 2012, won the North I Group I title in 2007, and won the Non-Public North title in 2013 and 2015-2019. The team won the Group I state championship in 2006 (defeating Eustace Preparatory School in the tournament final), 2007 (vs. Holy Cross Preparatory Academy), 2008 (vs. Glassboro High School), 2010 (vs. St. Joseph High School) and 2012 (vs. St. Joseph), won the Non-Public state title in 2013 (vs. St. Joseph), 2014 (vs. Bishop Eustace), 2015 (vs. Bishop Eustace), 2017 (vs. Bishop Eustace), 2018 (vs. Bishop Eustace) and 2019 (vs. Camden Catholic High School), 2021 (vs. Camden Catholic), 2024 (vs. Camden Catholic) and 2025 (vs. Camden Catholic). The program's 14 state titles are the fifth-most in the state. The team won the Tournament of Champions in 2010, 2017 and 2019 (vs. Eastern Regional High School in each of the three years). In 2007, the team won the North I, Group I state sectional championship with a 4–1 win over Pompton Lakes High School in the tournament final. The team moved on to win the Group I state championship with a 2–1 win over Shore Regional High School in the semis and a 4–0 win against Holy Cross High School in the finals. In a repeat of the previous year's final, the 2015 team beat Bishop Eustace by a score of 4-2 in the championship game to win the Non-Public state title. The team won the Union County Tournament for the ninth straight year in 2018 with a 7–1 win in the tournament final against Kent Place School. The school's field hockey team was the winner of the 2019 Tournament of Champions title, the third time in the school's history, with a 4–1 win against Eastern Regional High School in the tournament final.

The lacrosse team has won the Group I state championship in 2010 (vs. Glen Ridge High School in the tournament final), 2013 (vs. Mountain Lakes High School), 2015 (vs. Shore Regional High School), 2016 (vs. Shore Regional), 2017 (vs. Middle Township High School), 2018 (vs. Pingry School) and 2019 (vs. Pingry); the seven state group titles are tied for the third most in the state. The team was the winner of the Tournament of Champions in 2015, defeating Summit High School in the final and in 2019 against Moorestown High School. The girls' lacrosse team won the 2005 North B state championship with an 8–4 win over Mountain Lakes High School. After falling behind by a score of 4-0 after five minutes of the tournament final, the 2013 girls lacrosse team went on to defeat Mountain Lakes High School by a score of 10–9 to win the Group I state championship.

The soccer team won the Non-Public Group B state championship in 2011 (defeating Mater Dei High School in the tournament final) and 2016 (as co-champion with Red Bank Catholic High School).

The outdoor track and field team won the Non-Public B state championship in 2015.

The girls' ice hockey team won the Union County Championship in 2020, the first year of the competition, with a 5–0 win against Summit High School.

== Notable alumni ==
- Michelle Cesan (born 1991), field hockey player who competed for the United States women's national field hockey team in the women's event at the 2012 Summer Olympics
- Aileen Quinn (born 1971), actress, singer and dancer best known for her role as Annie Bennett Warbucks in the 1982 film Annie
