= Jim Dowd (ice hockey) =

American ice hockey player (born 1968)

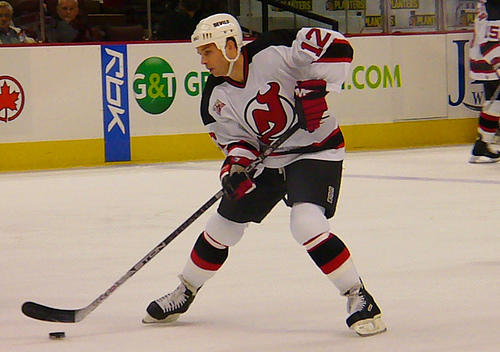
- Born: December 25, 1968 (age 57) Brick, New Jersey, U.S.
- Height: 5 ft 10 in (178 cm)
- Weight: 190 lb (86 kg; 13 st 8 lb)
- Position: Center
- Shot: Right
- Played for: New Jersey Devils; Vancouver Canucks; New York Islanders; Calgary Flames; Edmonton Oilers; Minnesota Wild; Montreal Canadiens; Chicago Blackhawks; Colorado Avalanche; Philadelphia Flyers; Hamburg Freezers
- NHL draft: 149th overall, 1987; New Jersey Devils
- Playing career: 1991–2008

James Thomas Dowd (born December 25, 1968) is an American former professional ice hockey center who played in the National Hockey League (NHL) for ten different teams over the course of 17 NHL seasons. Dowd, who won the 1995 Stanley Cup with his hometown New Jersey Devils, was the second New Jersey high school hockey player to make it to the NHL. He is also a frequent guest on NHL Live.

== Early life, high school and college ==
Dowd helped Brick Township High School win the New Jersey State Interscholastic Athletic Association ice hockey title for the 1985–86 season. In his senior year, he broke the national scholastic scoring record, finishing with a four-year tally of 375 points (189 goals and 186 assists).

Dowd was selected in the eighth round, 149th overall, by the New Jersey Devils in the 1987 NHL entry draft. He went to Lake Superior State University in the fall of 1987. In his four years with the Lakers men's ice hockey team, competing in the Central Collegiate Hockey Association (CCHA), Dowd was a prolific scorer, earning selections to the NCAA West Second All-American and CCHA Second All-Star Teams in 1990 and the NCAA West First All-American and CCHA First All-Star Teams in 1991. He was also named the CCHA's "Player of the Year" in 1991. He was a member of the Lakers's 1988 NCAA Championship squad.

== Pro hockey career ==
=== New Jersey Devils and the Stanley Cup ===
After college, Dowd joined New Jersey's American Hockey League (AHL) affiliate at the time, the Utica Devils. He became the first New Jersey native to play for the New Jersey Devils when he made his NHL debut during the 1991–92 season. He spent the 1991–92 and the 1992–93 seasons in the AHL, with single-game NHL appearances in both seasons. As a top scorer with the AHL's Albany River Rats (the Devils' subsequent AHL affiliate) in the 1993–94 season, Dowd made impressive appearances with the Devils, collecting five goals and ten assists in 15 regular season games, and two goals and six assists in 19 games during their playoff run. The labor dispute shortened the 1994–95 season, which was further shortened for Dowd when a shoulder injury and surgery caused him to miss 35 games. However, the highlight of Dowd's career with the Devils came in game two of the 1995 Stanley Cup Final. With 1:24 left in regulation, he scored the game-winning goal, giving the Devils a 2–0 series lead over the Detroit Red Wings to take back home to New Jersey. The Devils completed the sweep at home for their first Stanley Cup Championship. Dowd became the first New Jersey native to both play and win the Stanley Cup for the Devils franchise.

=== Late 1990s ===
On December 19, 1995, less than six months after helping the Devils capture the Stanley Cup, Dowd was traded (alongside a 1997 second-round draft pick) to the Hartford Whalers in exchange for Jocelyn Lemieux and a second-round pick in 1998. Later that same day, Hartford traded Dowd (alongside František Kučera and the same second-round pick in 1997) to the Vancouver Canucks in exchange for Jeff Brown and a fifth-round pick in 1998. Dowd would only play 38 regular season games and one playoff game for the Canucks.

On September 30, 1996, the New York Islanders claimed Dowd in the NHL Waiver Draft. He only played in three games for New York, spending the rest of the 1996–97 season with the International Hockey League (IHL)'s Utah Grizzlies and the AHL's Saint John Flames.

On July 10, 1997, Dowd signed as a free agent with the Calgary Flames. In the 1997–98 season, he played in 48 games in Calgary and another 35 regular season (and 19 playoff) games with the Saint John Flames.

On June 27, 1998, Dowd was traded to the expansion Nashville Predators in exchange for future considerations. On October 1, 1998, for the second time in his career, he was traded before playing a single game, this time to the Edmonton Oilers (alongside Mikhail Shtalenkov) in exchange for Éric Fichaud, Drake Berehowsky and Greg de Vries. Dowd appeared in one game with the Oilers during the 1998–99 season, spending the rest of the season with their AHL affiliate, the Hamilton Bulldogs. On September 7, 1999, as a group two free agent, he re-signed with Edmonton and played the 1999–2000 season with the Oilers, appearing in an NHL career-high 69 games.

=== 2000s ===
The next chapter in Dowd's career began on June 23, 2000, when the Minnesota Wild selected him during the 2000 NHL Expansion Draft. On March 4, 2004, after nearly four seasons with the Wild, he was traded to the Montreal Canadiens in exchange for a fourth-round draft pick in 2004. After the season, Dowd became an unrestricted free agent and signed with Germany's Hamburg Freezers during the 2004–05 NHL lockout. Following the lockout, on August 5, 2005, he signed with the Chicago Blackhawks.

On March 9, 2006, Dowd was traded to the Colorado Avalanche in exchange for a fourth-round draft pick in 2006. His brief tenure with the Avalanche ended after the 2005–06 season, with Dowd again becoming a free agent.

On November 2, 2006, after New Jersey Devils left winger Dan LaCouture cleared waivers, the Devils signed Dowd to a one-year contract. The contract paid Dowd the NHL minimum of $450,000. When Dowd returned to the Devils, he was forced to wear jersey #12, as John Madden wore his old #11. Dowd went on to score four goals as well as have his first career multi-goal game, against the Florida Panthers.

After the season ended with a loss to the Ottawa Senators in the second round of the playoffs, questions arose about the futures of Devils veterans such as Dowd, who was scratched several times in favor of Rod Pelley. On September 11, Dowd announced that general manager Lou Lamoriello and the Devils were uninterested in offering him a contract and instead attended the Philadelphia Flyers' training camp on a try-out contract. He made the team and became a solid penalty killer and defensive center for the Flyers during the 2007–08, scoring his first goal with the Flyers against the Devils. Dowd was invited to the Flyers' training camp on a tryout basis again in 2008, he was released after the last game of the Flyers' 2008–09 pre-season, along with Bryan Berard, to allow rookie development, notably of Danny Syvret and Darroll Powe. On April 7, 2009, Dowd announced his retirement as a player.

== Off the ice ==
Jim Dowd's Shoot for the Stars Foundation holds an Annual Shore High School All-Star Hockey Game. The All-Star Games and other events hosted by Shoot for the Stars raise money for local families in need due to illnesses. He also coaches ice hockey for the Red Bank Generals, a travel organization in his home state of New Jersey.

After his retirement from the NHL in 2009, Dowd was inducted into the NJSIAA Hall of Fame. The following year, he was inducted into the Lake Superior State Hall of Fame.

In September 2011, Dowd appeared at Mother Teresa Regional School in Atlantic Highlands as part of a fundraiser benefiting the American Red Cross. He spoke to students and players from the school, as well as shooting around with them before signing autographs.

== Career statistics ==
			Regular season					Playoffs
Season	Team	League	GP	G	A	Pts	PIM	GP	G	A	Pts	PIM
1983–84	Brick Township High School	HS-NJ	20	19	30	49	—	—	—	—	—	—
1984–85	Brick Township High School	HS-NJ	24	58	55	113	—	—	—	—	—	—
1985–86	Brick Township High School	HS-NJ	24	57	41	98	—	—	—	—	—	—
1986–87	Brick Township High School	HS-NJ	—	62	53	115	—	—	—	—	—	—
1987–88	Lake Superior State University	CCHA	45	18	27	45	16	—	—	—	—	—
1988–89	Lake Superior State University	CCHA	46	24	35	59	40	—	—	—	—	—
1989–90	Lake Superior State University	CCHA	46	25	67	92	30	—	—	—	—	—
1990–91	Lake Superior State University	CCHA	44	24	54	78	53	—	—	—	—	—
1991–92	Utica Devils	AHL	78	17	42	59	47	4	2	2	4	4
1991–92	New Jersey Devils	NHL	1	0	0	0	0	—	—	—	—	—
1992–93	Utica Devils	AHL	78	27	45	72	62	5	1	7	8	10
1992–93	New Jersey Devils	NHL	1	0	0	0	0	—	—	—	—	—
1993–94	Albany River Rats	AHL	58	26	37	63	76	—	—	—	—	—
1993–94	New Jersey Devils	NHL	15	5	10	15	0	19	2	6	8	8
1994–95	New Jersey Devils	NHL	10	1	4	5	0	11	2	1	3	8
1995–96	New Jersey Devils	NHL	28	4	9	13	17	—	—	—	—	—
1995–96	Vancouver Canucks	NHL	38	1	6	7	6	1	0	0	0	0
1996–97	New York Islanders	NHL	3	0	0	0	0	—	—	—	—	—
1996–97	Utah Grizzlies	IHL	48	10	21	31	27	—	—	—	—	—
1996–97	Saint John Flames	AHL	24	5	11	16	18	5	1	2	3	0
1997–98	Saint John Flames	AHL	35	8	30	38	20	19	3	13	16	10
1997–98	Calgary Flames	NHL	48	6	8	14	12	—	—	—	—	—
1998–99	Edmonton Oilers	NHL	1	0	0	0	0	—	—	—	—	—
1998–99	Hamilton Bulldogs	AHL	51	15	29	44	82	11	3	6	9	8
1999–2000	Edmonton Oilers	NHL	69	5	18	23	45	5	2	1	3	4
2000–01	Minnesota Wild	NHL	68	7	22	29	80	—	—	—	—	—
2001–02	Minnesota Wild	NHL	82	13	30	43	54	—	—	—	—	—
2002–03	Minnesota Wild	NHL	78	8	17	25	31	15	0	2	2	0
2003–04	Minnesota Wild	NHL	55	4	20	24	38	—	—	—	—	—
2003–04	Montreal Canadiens	NHL	14	3	2	5	6	11	0	2	2	2
2004–05	Hamburg Freezers	DEL	20	4	9	13	12	—	—	—	—	—
2005–06	Chicago Blackhawks	NHL	60	3	12	15	38	—	—	—	—	—
2005–06	Colorado Avalanche	NHL	18	2	1	3	2	9	2	3	5	20
2006–07	New Jersey Devils	NHL	66	4	4	8	20	11	0	0	0	4
2007–08	Philadelphia Flyers	NHL	73	5	5	10	41	17	1	2	3	4
AHL totals			324	98	194	292	305	44	10	30	40	32
NHL totals			728	71	168	239	390	99	9	17	26	50

== Awards and honors ==
Award	Year
All-CCHA Second Team	1989–90
AHCA West Second-Team All-American	1989–90
All-CCHA First Team	1990–91
AHCA West First-Team All-American	1990–91
NHL Stanley Cup champion	1994–95

Awards and achievements
Preceded by Kip Miller	CCHA Player of the Year; 1990-91	Succeeded by Dwayne Norris
Preceded by Darby Hendrickson	Minnesota Wild captain October 2001	Succeeded by Filip Kuba
Preceded by Brad Bombardir	Minnesota Wild captain February 2004	Succeeded by Andrew Brunette
