= List of schools in the Roman Catholic Diocese of Trenton =

List of schools in the Roman Catholic Diocese of Trenton.

== K-12 schools ==
- Stuart Country Day School of the Sacred Heart*, Princeton
- Trenton Catholic Academy, Hamilton - Had lower school and upper school divisions- closed in 2021

*Operates independently with the concurrence of the Diocese.

== 6-12 schools ==
- Villa Victoria Academy*, Ewing Township

*Operates independently with the concurrence of the Diocese.

== High schools ==
- Christian Brothers Academy*, Lincroft
- Donovan Catholic High School, Toms River (known as St. Joseph High School until 1983 and Monsignor Donovan High School until 2014)
- Holy Cross Academy, Delran
- Mater Dei Prep*, Middletown
- Notre Dame High School, Lawrenceville
- Red Bank Catholic High School, Red Bank
- St. John Vianney High School, Holmdel
- St. Rose High School, Belmar
- Trinity Hall*, Tinton Falls

*Operates independently with the concurrence of the Diocese.

== Elementary schools ==
Burlington County

- Our Lady of Good Counsel (Moorestown)
- Sacred Heart School (Mount Holly)
- St. Charles Borromeo Parish School (Cinnaminson)
- St. Joan of Arc School (Marlton)
- St. Mary of the Lakes School (Medford)
- St. Paul Grammar School (Burlington)

Mercer County

- Our Lady of Sorrows School (Hamilton)
- St. Ann School (Lawrenceville)
- St. Gregory the Great Academy (Hamilton Square)
- St. Paul School (Princeton)
- St. Raphael School (Hamilton)

Monmouth County

- Holy Cross Academy (Rumson)
- Mother Seton Academy (Howell Township) - Formed in 2019 by the merger of St. Aloysius and St. Veronica.
- Our Lady of Mount Carmel School (Asbury Park)
- St. Benedict School (Holmdel)
- St. Catharine School (Spring Lake)
- St. James Elementary School (Red Bank)
- St. Jerome School (West Long Branch)
- St. Leo the Great School (Lincroft)
- St. Mary School (Middletown)
- St. Rose Grammar School (Belmar)
- St. Rose of Lima School (Freehold)

Ocean County

- St. Dominic School (Brick)
- St. Joseph Grammar School (Toms River)
- St. Mary Academy (Stafford Township, near Manahawkin CDP - From 1997, until 2019 it operated as All Saints Regional Catholic School and was collectively managed by five churches. In 2019 St. Mary Church of Barnegat took entire control of the school, which remained on the same Manahawkin campus, and changed its name. The other churches no longer operate the school but still may send students there. The other churches that formerly collectively operated the school include: St. Elizabeth Ann Seton Church in Whiting, St. Francis of Assisi Church in Brant Beach, St. Pius X Church near Forked River CDP (in Lacey Township and adjacent to the Forked River CDP.), and St. Theresa Church in Little Egg Harbor. The five churches still participate in sending students to the school.
- St. Peter Grammar School (Point Pleasant)

Private (non-diocesan) Schools

- Princeton Academy of the Sacred Heart (Princeton)

== Former schools ==
Monmouth County

- Holy Innocents School (Neptune Township) - Closed in 2019 as, while the school administration stated it would be sustainable at 200 students, it had only 93 students.
- Mother Teresa Regional School (MTRS) was a Catholic school, which offered grades pre-K to eighth, in the Diocese of Trenton in Atlantic Highlands, New Jersey, that closed in 2016.
- St. Veronica School (Howell) - Merged into Mother Seton Academy in 2019.

Ocean County

- St. Aloysius School (Jackson) - Merged into Mother Seton Academy in 2019.
