= Haddonfield Friends School =

Coordinates: 39.89919°N 75.03360°W

Location
- 47 North Haddon Avenue; Haddonfield, NJ 08033

Information
- School type: Private primary school
- Founded: 1786; 240 years ago
- Status: Open
- School district: New Jersey Association of Independent Schools
- Principal: Matthew Sharp, Head of School
- Staff: 21.4 (on FTE basis)
- Grades: Pre-K – 8
- Enrollment: 150 (2017-18)
- Language: English
- Hours in school day: 7.0
- Communities served: Camden County
- Website: School website

Haddonfield Friends School (HFS) is a private, Quaker coeducational day school in Haddonfield, in Camden County, New Jersey, United States. The school serves students in pre-kindergarten through eighth grade.

Haddonfield Friends School is accredited by the Middle States Association of Colleges and SchoolsCommission on Elementary Schools, and is a member of the New Jersey Association of Independent Schools and the Association of Delaware Valley Independent Schools.

== History ==
In 1713, settler Elizabeth Haddon Estaugh was given an acre of land from her father, John Haddon, on which to build a Quaker Meetinghouse and burial grounds. This would become the site of Haddonfield Friends School after her death.

The school was founded in 1786 by members of the Religious Society of Friends to offer education in a setting that would honor Quaker values. A one-room brick building on Haddon Avenue, adjacent to the Meeting burial ground, housed the school. Haddonfield Free School, as they named it, served the children of both Friends and non-Friends, and was the only "public" school in Haddonfield for about 25 years.

Additional classroom space is used at the Meeting House, located on Friends Avenue directly behind the school. The Early Childhood Center is home to the school's youngest students ages two and a half years to five years. The remainder of the students, Kindergarten through Eighth grade, along with the special subject area classrooms, are located in the main school building at 47 N. Haddon Avenue.
