= All Saints Episcopal Day School =

All Saints Day School
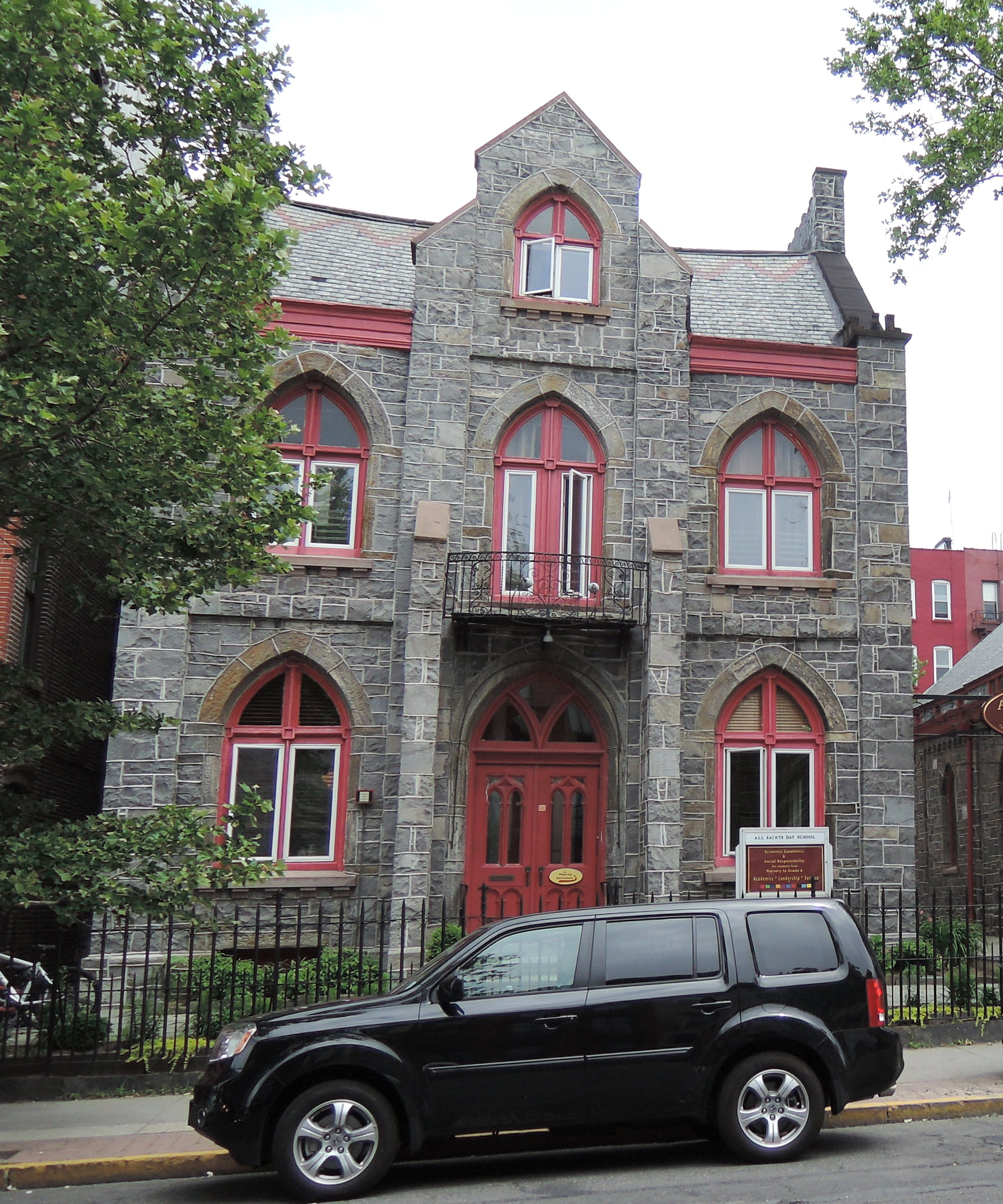
- All Saints School, Washington Street side

Location
- 707 Washington Street; Hoboken, NJ 07030; United States; 40.7451°N 74.0285°W

Information
- NCES School ID: A9104271
- Head of school: Tom Trigg
- Faculty: 26
- Grades: Preschool-8th grade
- Enrollment: 137
- Average class size: 12
- Student to teacher ratio: 5:1
- Accreditation: New Jersey Association of Independent Schools
- Website: www.allsaintsdayschool.org

All Saints Day School is a co-educational independent school for students from Pre-K3 to 8th grade. The school is located in Hoboken, New Jersey, and occupies two campuses: the Elementary, Intermediate and Middle schools are located at 707 Washington Street on the corner of 7th and Washington Streets, and the Clinton Campus, which is located at 527 Clinton St. on the corner of Sixth and Clinton Streets, houses the Pre-K3, Pre-K4, Kindergarten and Grade 1 programs. Both campuses boast historic landmark buildings, and include a gymnasium, movement room, science lab, art room, and private outdoor play yards. There are SMART Boards in all classrooms and networked computers throughout all of the buildings.

The core curriculum consists of language arts, mathematics, science, social studies, physical education, world language and health, as well as special subjects including art, music, dance, drama, computers, and community service. The overall Student–teacher ratio is 5 to 1. All Saints is an IB World School meaning that it is authorized to provide the IB Programme to all of the grade levels the school covers. IB World Schools share a common philosophy – a commitment to high-quality, challenging, international education.

Each grade takes approximately six to ten field trips in New York City and the surrounding area each year. Beginning in fifth grade, students also participate in multi-day trips, including visits to Frost Valley Farm Camp in fifth grade, Clearpool Green Chimneys in sixth grade, and Boston in seventh grade. Eighth-grade students take an international capstone trip. In recent years, destinations have included Scotland, where students have participated in activities related to environmental sustainability and global citizenship.

The majority of teachers at All Saints hold advanced degrees in their fields and/or areas of expertise, and are certified to teach in the state of New Jersey, and the staff of more than 30 teachers and assistants are supported in continued professional development. One All Saints Middle School teacher was named Teacher of the Year in October 2011 by the New Jersey Council for American Private Education (NJ CAPE). The award is presented annually by NJ CAPE and presented by the New Jersey Deputy Commissioner of Education. The faculty at All Saints routinely present their work at conferences in the state and around the country. All Saints Episcopal Day School is accredited by the New Jersey Association of Independent Schools.

== Notable Alumni ==
- Clavicular
