= Westfield Friends School =

Location
- 2201 Riverton Road; Cinnaminson, New Jersey 08077; United States; 39.99510°N 74.99190°W

Information
- Other names: Westfield Friends, WFS
- School type: Private; Independent; Day
- Motto: The World We Seek For Children Begins Here
- Religious affiliation: Quaker
- Established: 1788; 238 years ago
- Founder: Abraham Warrington
- NCES School ID: 00868123
- Head of school: Dr. Margaret Haviland
- Faculty: 33
- Grades: Preschool–8
- Gender: Coed
- Age: 2+
- Enrollment: 153 (2025)
- Average class size: 12
- Student to teacher ratio: 6:1
- Campus size: 8.5 acres (3.4 ha)
- Campus type: Suburban
- Colors: Garnet and Blue
- Mascot: Hootie the Owl
- Affiliations: NAIS, NJAIS, ADVIS, Friends Council on Education
- Website: westfieldfriends.org

Westfield Friends School (also known as WFS) is a private, coeducational Quaker day school in Cinnaminson, New Jersey, United States, within the Philadelphia metro area. Founded in 1788 and under the care of the Westfield Friends Meeting, it is the oldest Friends school in the United States operated by a meeting. The school's grounds are an 8 1/2-acre suburban campus.

The school includes preschool through eighth grade, offering students an education based in Quaker values and an academic curriculum that prepares students for college-bound tracks in high school.

== History ==
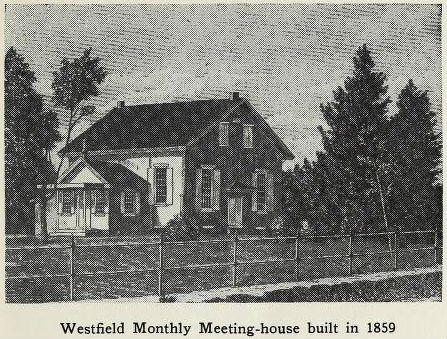
Historical sketch: Westfield Friends Meeting-house (by Nathan H. Conrow). Exact publication date is unknown.

In 1785, land on Riverton Road in Cinnaminson Township, New Jersey, valued at "Six Pounds, Hard Money" was purchased by Westfield Friends Meeting, the local monthly meeting of the Religious Society of Friends (Quakers). The land had earlier been owned by Thomas Lippincott and called his "West Field," hence the name that remains today.

The school was founded in 1788. In that year, the monthly meeting appointed a committee to visit and have the oversight of a school kept by Abraham Warrington. This school was likely kept in his own home near Fork Landing and was co-educational from the time of its founding. Westfield Friends School has been operated under the care of the Westfield Friends Meeting for all of its history, making it the oldest Quaker school in the United States run by a meeting (church congregation).

In the summer of 1791, Warrington proposed purchasing "a lot of ground off of the upper corner of Samuel Shute’s lands for erecting a school house." The meeting records further show that this lot was purchased from Samuel Shute on July 27, 1791 and presumably the stone schoolhouse was erected shortly afterwards. This school building stood on or very near the site of the present-day brick pre-kindergarten building on Riverton Road.

In 1799 more land was acquired by Westfield Friends Meeting. The 1791 building was torn down in 1840, with salvaged materials used in the construction of the foundation walls of the present larger brick building. The building has remained in use since that time and has been enlarged five times. Funded by revenue from the sale of additional land, construction of a new brick meeting house was completed on April 13, 1860. This building is now the school's pre-kindergarten annex. With the exception of three years from 1905–1907, the school has been continually active since 1795.

The centuries-long relationship between the school and the meeting has shaped both communities, which consider the relationship "a precious stewardship and trust."

== Enrollment and school structure ==
Westfield Friends School enrolls students age 2 (in preschool) through grade 8. Total enrollment is 140, with 15 faculty, for a student-to-teacher ratio of approximately 9:1. The average class size is 11. The school has an early learning program with full-day pre-kindergarten and full-day kindergarten, a lower school with grades one to five, and a middle school with grades six through eight. The school does not include a special education program.

== Academics ==
Along with academic preparation for high school, students at Westfield Friends School participate in classes in visual arts, music, library, STEAM, health, world languages (Spanish and Latin), physical education, and technology and STEAM instruction.

The educational experience at the school includes the core Quaker values, or "testimonies", summarized with the acronym SPICES (simplicity, peace, integrity, community, equality, and stewardship), which are an integral part of every grade and classroom.

=== Academic technology ===
Westfield Friends School has more than 100 computers and laptops (Chromebooks) throughout the school, including in a computer lab, on laptop cart, and with technology in every classroom. Additionally, many classrooms are equipped with Mimio interactive whiteboards.

The WFS campus has Wi-Fi accessibility throughout the entire school, and eighth grade students are granted access to connect with their own personal devices.

The school's library houses a computer processing center for students to research and prepare written work. The library's online catalog is available via the network throughout the school and remotely. Students are also able to check out laptops and digital cameras from the library.

== Extracurricular activities ==
=== Clubs ===
Extracurricular activities at WFS include team sports (field hockey, soccer, and track and field), community service projects, instrumental music, Chinese language, visual arts, robotics, and drama classes in partnership with the Moorestown Theater Company.

=== Meeting for Worship ===
Each week, the Westfield Friends School community gathers in the meetinghouse for Meeting for Worship. Friends believe that each person has within him/herself, with God's help, the ability to discern truth. Participants use this time to pray, worship, or simply reflect deeply on the world around them, according to their own faith traditions.

Since Friends believe that each person, regardless of age, is able to discern truth, all are welcome to speak from their hearts if so moved. It is expected that their words will be listened to from the same deep connection to the Spirit and provide insight for the listeners. When the Meeting for Worship is over, students on the facing benches close the meeting by shaking hands. At this point everyone is invited to greet their neighbor briefly before settling back into quiet for dismissal.

== Campus ==
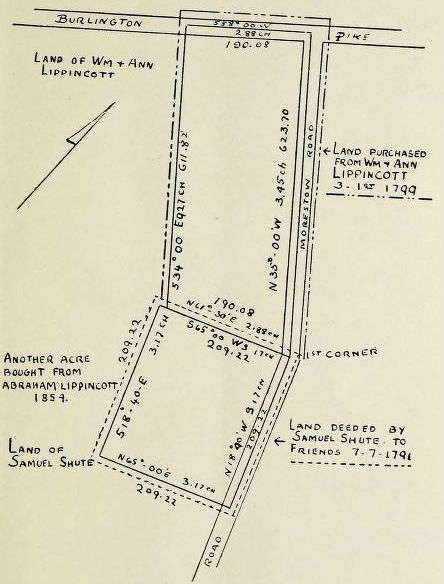
Historical sketch: Westfield Friends Meeting site map (by Nathan H. Conrow). Exact publication date is unknown.

The campus of Westfield Friends School is 8.5 acres in a suburban neighborhood. More than 60 species of trees are found on the property.

== People ==
=== Heads of school ===
- Margaret Haviland (2019–present)
- Jon R. Hall (2016–2019) – Prior to his three-year service at Westfield Friends School, Hall was assistant head of school and the middle school head at Montgomery School in Chester Springs, Pennsylvania.
- Peter Pearson (interim) (2013–2016)
- William C. Probsting (1973–2013) – Probsting was employed at Westfield Friends School close to forty years.
- Helen Marshall
- Miss (Mrs?) Diehl (during or before the early 1950s-her death in the late 1950s)
- Mr. Stillwell (became Principal upon Miss Diehl's death)

=== Early teachers ===
- William Parry
- Benjamin Hallowell (1818-?)
- Charlotte Brewster (1882-1884)
- Abbie Evans (1879-1882)
- Helen Marshall (1877-1883/4/5)
