= Princeton Academy of the Sacred Heart =

- "We Bring Out the Best in Boys"

Location
- 1128 Great Road; Princeton, Mercer County, NJ 08540; United States; 40°22′34″N 74°42′0″W

Information
- Type: Private, All-Boys Independent School
- Religious affiliation: Roman Catholic
- Established: 1998
- Oversight: Board of Trustees
- Chairperson: Paul Fernandes
- Head of school: Kathleen Humora
- Faculty: 27 (on FTE basis)
- Grades: JK-8
- Enrollment: 92 (2024-2025)
- Student to teacher ratio: 8:1
- Campus size: 50 acres
- Colors: Navy and Green
- Sports: Golf, Cross-Country, Soccer, Basketball, Squash, Wrestling, Baseball, Lacrosse, Tennis
- Mascot: The Hawk
- Accreditation: Middle States Association of Colleges and Schools
- Yearbook: The Aerie
- Affiliation: Society of the Sacred Heart
- Dean of Students: Tim Stevens
- Website: http://www.princetonacademy.org

Princeton Academy of the Sacred Heart is an independent school for boys from Junior Kindergarten through Grade 8. Located in Princeton, New Jersey the school is part of the Network of Sacred Heart Schools.

The school is divided into two sections: a Lower School (Junior Kindergarten through Grade 4) and a Middle School (Grade 5 through Grade 8). Princeton Academy has been accredited by the Middle States Association of Colleges and Schools since 2003. It is overseen by the New Jersey Department of Education and, in addition to being a member of the Network of the Sacred Heart Schools, is part of the National Association of Independent Schools, the New Jersey Association of Independent Schools, the Association of Delaware Valley Independent Schools, the International Boys' Schools Coalition (IBSC), the Council for Spiritual and Ethical Education, the Council for Advancement and Support of Education, and the Educational Records Bureau.

== Mission ==
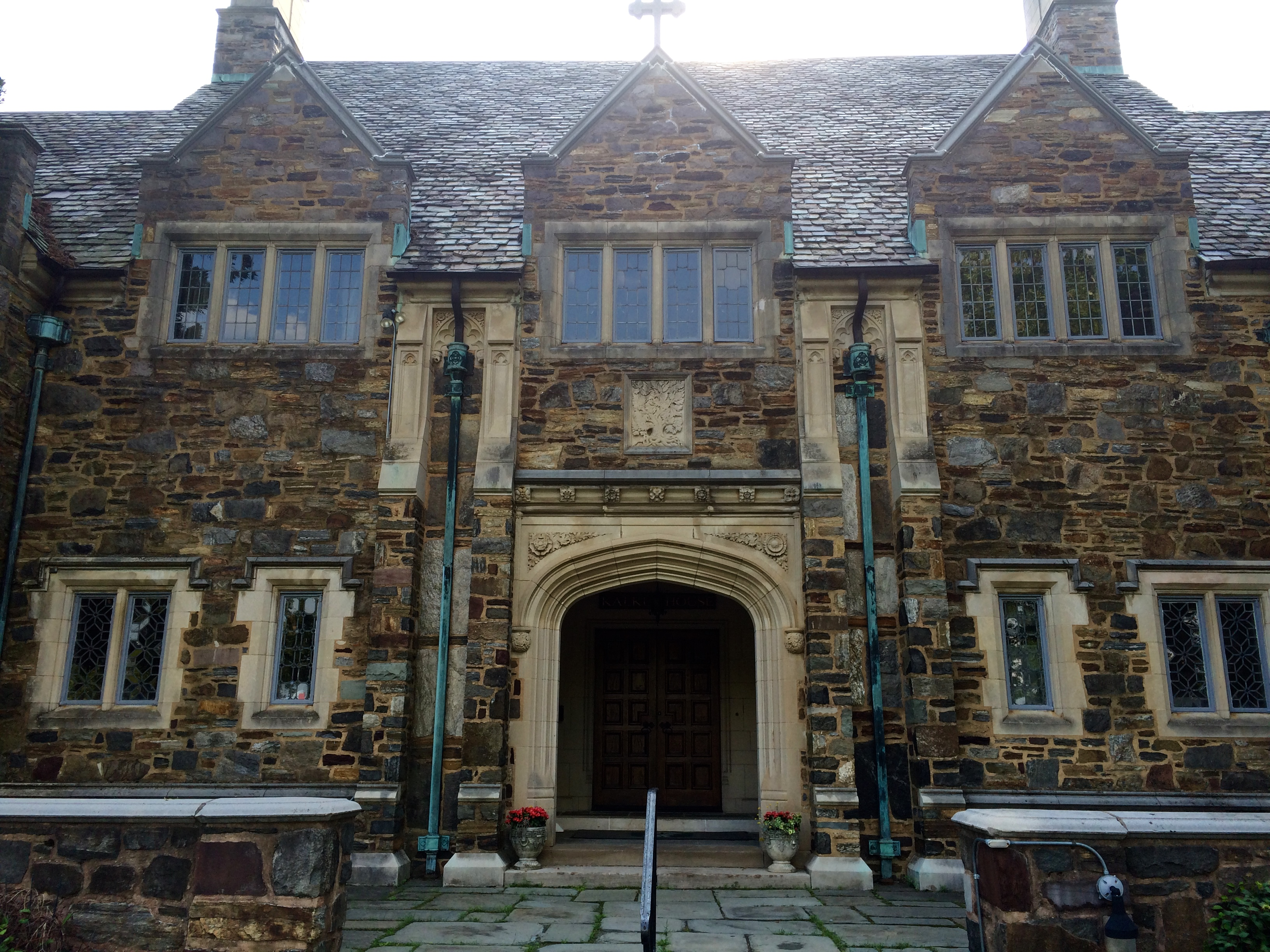
Kalkus House

Princeton Academy's mission is to develop young men with active and creative minds, a sense of understanding and compassion for others, and the courage to act on their beliefs. The school stresses the total development of each child: spiritual, moral, intellectual, social, emotional, and physical.

The school's philosophy is rooted in the tradition of the Society of the Sacred Heart, which educates children to become leaders of a just society by adhering to the following five goals:

- A personal and active faith in God
- A deep respect for intellectual values
- A social awareness which impels to action
- The building of community as a Christian value
- Personal growth in an atmosphere of wise freedom

== Academics ==
The instruction at Princeton Academy is designed to build on skills and knowledge gained in the preceding grades, in a way both developmentally appropriate and progressively challenging.

=== Lower School Curriculum ===
==== Language Arts ====
The foundation of the Princeton Academy language arts curriculum is the belief that language arts are integral to the learning process of any subject at any level. Boys at Princeton Academy have ample opportunity and time to read and write independently, as well as to experience excellent modeling of reading and writing. The Junior Great Books program assists in reinforcing high-level comprehension skills. The Lower School also employs Word Journeys and Words Their Way, developmental spelling and phonics programs based on the philosophy that understanding of the printed word occurs in clear stages. Instruction is designed to meet the specific needs of each boy. Handwriting Without Tears meets the fine motor needs of boys through its clear, simple letter formation and interactive learning style.

==== Science and Mathematics ====
Everyday Math emphasizes a balance between learning concepts, skills, and problem solving. In each grade level, content is divided into six strands: number and numeration, operations and computation, data and chance, measurement, geometry and patterns, functions, and algebra.

Through FOSS inquiry-based science, the boys develop skills of observation, documentation, data collection, and data analysis. Curriculum connections to science and social studies units that are studied in the regular classroom assist in developing content knowledge through varied means.

==== Foreign Language ====
Students are introduced to Spanish beginning in Kindergarten, and by third grade are attending classes four days a week for 30 minutes. Instruction occurs through games, songs, and literature, with a focus on conversational skills. Students are gradually introduced to the printed word and in third grade begin to read and write in Spanish.

==== Other Subjects ====
All Princeton Academy students attend religion, music, art, and physical education for two periods a week.

=== Middle School Curriculum ===
The Middle School program consists of five core academic subjects: English, mathematics, science, social studies, and Spanish. There are four special subjects: religion, music, art, and physical education.

==== English ====
The English program promotes an understanding and appreciation of literature and strengthens basic writing skills. Students read and study fiction of various genres, non-fiction, short stories from the Junior Great Books program, plays, poetry, and films. In response to literature, students acquire thinking, planning, drafting, and editing skills through expository, narrative, and creative writing. Students also continue to study English grammar, spelling, and vocabulary.

==== Mathematics ====
The Middle School mathematics program uses the University of Chicago Mathematics Project. This program uses a multi-dimensional approach emphasizing skills, properties, uses, and representations. The program stresses problem solving and the use of real-life applications.

==== Science ====
The science program promotes an active learning process where students build a strong knowledge of scientific processes, principles, and ideas, as well as develop inquiry skills for problem solving in both an analytical and creative manner. A highlight of the Princeton Academy science program is the Independent Science Project (ISP).

==== Social Studies ====
The social studies program aims to develop and strengthen students’ skills in reading and research, observation and listening, recording and organization, interpretation and analysis, and clarity in written work. Students are encouraged to think critically, formulate their own opinions about the past, and apply what they have learned to the present day.

==== Foreign Language ====
The Middle School Spanish program presents an integrated skills approach to Spanish. Both receptive (listening and reading) and productive (speaking and writing) proficiencies are developed. Students in Princeton Academy's 8th grade participate in the International Sacred Heart Exchange Program with a Sacred Heart school in Barcelona, the Colegio Sagrado Corazon de Sarria.

=== Athletics ===
Princeton Academy offers competitive sports teams for students in the Middle School (grades 5–8). The mission of the athletic program is to provide opportunities in which students can acquire skills, experience leadership, and grow personally. All students are encouraged to participate and to learn to balance academics, athletics, and the arts. The goal of the Athletic Department is to provide a positive experience for the boys on the field of competition. Every boy, from the novice to the advanced player, has the opportunity to participate in the program.

Princeton Academy offers the following sports:

- Fall
  - Cross Country
  - Soccer
  - Golf
- Winter
  - Basketball
  - Squash
  - Wrestling
- Spring
  - Baseball
  - Lacrosse
  - Tennis

=== Community service ===
Princeton Academy embraces the approach of Service Learning. This is a “teaching and learning strategy that integrates meaningful community service with instruction and reflection to enrich the learning experience, teach civic responsibility, and strengthen communities”. From JK – grade 8, students are involved in community service both for the school community and the community at large, with many of the activities created, designed, and implemented by the boys themselves under faculty guidance.

== History ==
=== Incorporation ===
Princeton Academy was incorporated in October 1998 and opened its doors in September 1999 with 34 students in grades K- 3.

== Campus ==
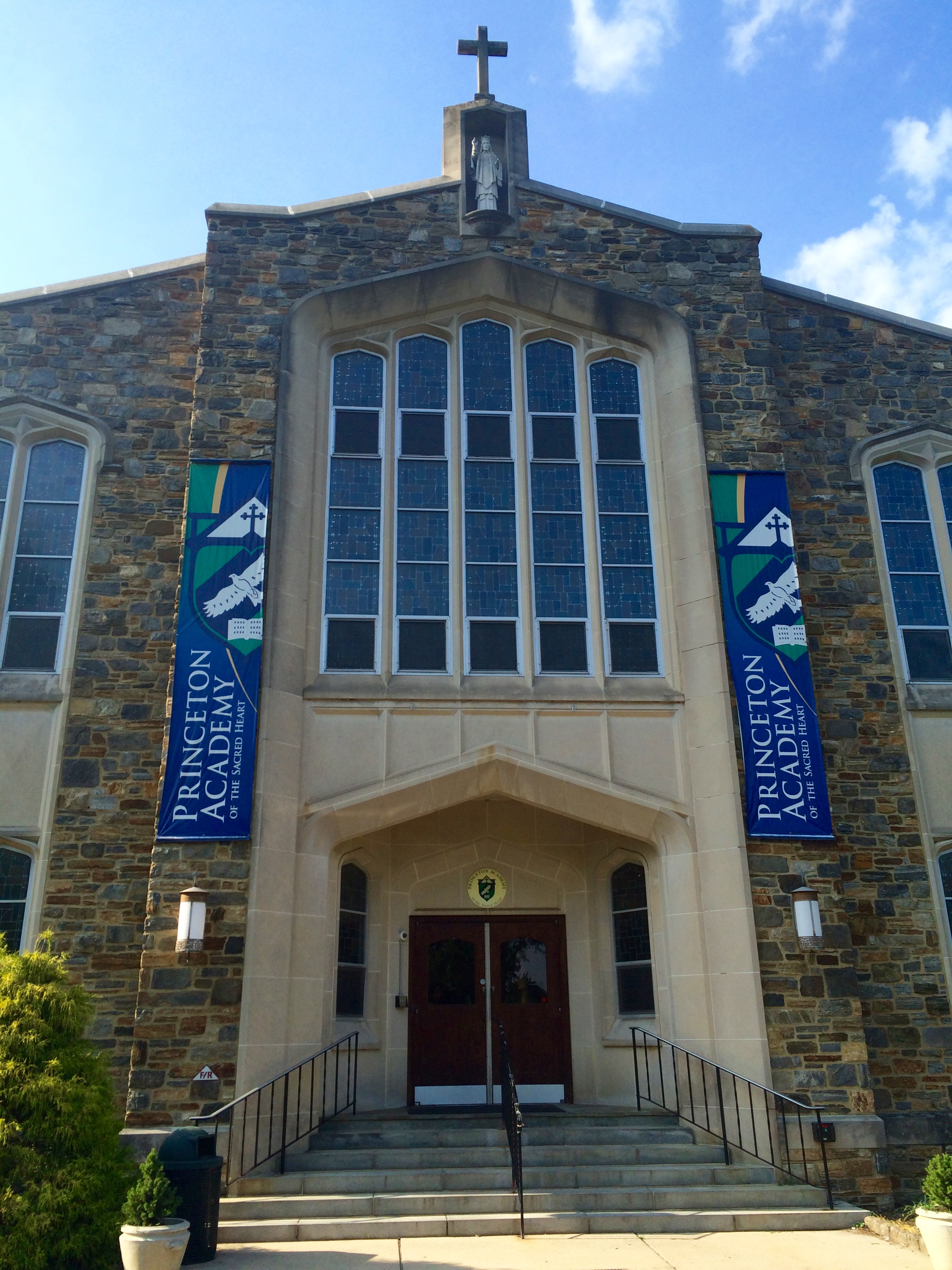
Main entrance

Princeton Academy is located on a 48-acre site approximately 3 miles from downtown Princeton, New Jersey. The Kalkus House (formerly Manor House), where administrative offices are located, was built in 1930 by Matthews Construction Company and designed by Rolf Bauhan for Helen and Thomas Dignan. The Dignans owned the house until 1947 when it was sold to the Marianites of Holy Cross. The property was called Our Lady of Princeton until sold to Princeton Academy of the Sacred Heart in the late 1990s.

The new Athletic and Convocation Center was dedicated in December 2006. The William E. Simon chapel library was designed by Richardson Smith Architects and was dedicated in January 2008. The William E. Simon Chapel Library features a five-panel silk painting of the Mater created by Princeton-area artist Juanita Yoder. It is customary for schools within the Sacred Heart network to display a painting of the Mater. Princeton Academy's representation of the Mater was inspired by a fresco of the Mater Admirabilis, which was created in 1844 and is hanging in the Trinita dei Monti in Rome, Italy.

The Manor House was renamed Kalkus House in the spring of 2015 in honor of founding headmaster Olen Kalkus.

In 2012, the school began drilling geothermal wells to reduce energy costs.

=== 2012-2014 Renovation ===
Starting in June 2012, the campus became a construction site as the school's Master Plan was carried out. Years of needs assessments, feasibility studies, and financial estimates translated into a two-phase renovation project that positioned the school for future growth and employed smart energy alternatives to conserve resources, and the 2012–13 school year for students started amidst construction vehicles, high-tech machinery, underground conduits, and demolition crews. Far from being a distraction, the activity has benefitted the boys academically. Thanks to architects and educators who recognized a unique "teachable moment," students learned first-hand about building, geophysics, and environmental stewardship.

Phase One of the Master Plan called for a complete renovation of the school's east wing and the creation of new lower and middle school classrooms, two science labs, and shared spaces. In addition, a geothermal field was installed to provide for the school's future cooling and heating needs. In Phase Two, work was done on the school's central wing, creating new art and music rooms and administrative offices.

The project's green and sustainable features included a geothermal field to heat and cool the school more efficiently, a layer of closed-cell spray insulation in exterior walls, insulated glass units in the windows, an updated roof design to allow more natural light and provide space for photovoltaic panels in the future, and compact fluorescent and LED light fixtures with occupancy sensors in each room.

During construction, classes and administrative offices were moved around, and some overflowed into the Manor House, but when the project was completed in the Fall of 2013, students, faculty, and staff moved back into the renovated space.

== Green Initiatives/Sustainability ==
Since its beginning, Princeton Academy has kept stewardship of the environment at the forefront of its growth and development. It has achieved this in a variety of ways. Princeton Academy challenged the "required" number of paved parking spaces for the school, with the result being that rather than have a giant parking lot on the beautiful campus, grassy areas could be retained and used as temporary spaces during the few times every year when additional parking is needed. Additionally, Princeton Academy petitioned the Township to minimize the number of lights along the driveway in order to support a "dark sky" philosophy. Because of these early initiatives, Princeton Academy and the surrounding community benefit from the natural habitats that flourish in large undeveloped meadows and enjoy incredible stargazing from the campus.

Princeton Academy's science program has a strong emphasis on understanding the environment and ecosystems. Building and renovation projects provided a wealth of hands-on, on-site science lessons, including a greenhouse designed to be a stand-alone structure requiring no man-made heating input. It works by facing south and absorbing heat into a tank of water during the day and releasing that heat at night. The Athletic and Convocation Center was built with an asymmetrical roof with a much larger area facing south, upon which solar panels can be placed in the future. It was built as deep into the ground as possible to take advantage of heat transfer and, due to large windows on the north wall, uses mainly natural light during the day.

Renovation and construction have heavily influenced design choices and plans. The 2012–13 school year began while 40 geothermal wells were being drilled on campus which now allow the school to cut back drastically on the carbon footprint of its HVAC. The east wing of the school building has a redesigned roofline to allow for larger north facing windows and a sloped roof to the south which provides greater surface area for solar panels. Data from both the geothermal wells and the school's lighting system appears on a dashboard in a common area so the school community can track energy usage and level savings that result from adjustments to use.
