= Stevens Cooperative School =

Private school in New Jersey, United States

Coordinates: 40.741859°N 74.03096°W

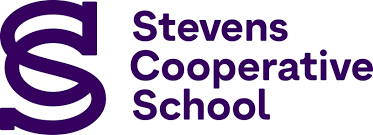

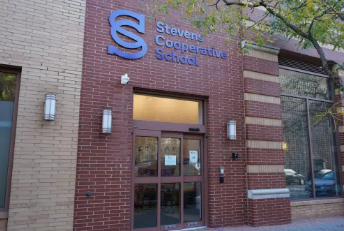

Location
- 301 Garden Street, Hoboken, NJ 07030; Hudson County, NJ; United States

Information
- School type: Private school; cooperative; preschool; elementary school; middle school
- Established: 1949
- Founder: Mary Sill Baker
- NCES District ID: A1702477
- Head of school: Sergio Alati
- Teaching staff: 70
- Grades: Pre-K – 8th
- Gender: Coeducational
- Age range: 3–14
- Enrollment: 430
- Student to teacher ratio: 6:1
- Campuses: Hoboken Campus Jersey City/Newport Campus
- Campus type: Urban
- Team name: Spartans
- Accreditation: New Jersey Association of Independent Schools (NJAIS) Middle States Association Commission on Elementary and Secondary Schools
- Website: https://www.stevenscoop.org/

Stevens Cooperative School is an independent cooperative school and private school with campuses in Hoboken and Jersey City, New Jersey, serving students from pre-kindergarten through eighth grade. Founded in 1949, it is the oldest parent cooperative school in New Jersey. Originally an informal playgroup for children of the faculty at Stevens Institute of Technology, the school has grown into a nursery, elementary and middle school with over 420 students.

== History ==
The Stevens Cooperative School originated in 1946, when Mary Sill Baker organized a playgroup for faculty children at the Stevens Institute of Technology in Hoboken, New Jersey. In 1949, the program was formally incorporated as the Stevens Cooperative Play School, moved into a renovated space at 800 Castle Point Terrace, and expanded to serve children from the broader community.

Originally a preschool, the school expanded beyond early childhood education in 1973 with the introduction of a kindergarten program. In 1976, the school expanded to offer first and second grades.

During this period, the school operated out of several locations in Hoboken, including local churches, before establishing more permanent facilities. In 1979, the institution began using its current name, the Stevens Cooperative School. Expansion continued through the 1980s, including the addition of upper elementary grades and the acquisition of a building at 220 Willow Avenue.

In 1992, the school relocated its upper grades to the Rue Building at Third and Garden Streets in Hoboken. In the 1990s, the school expanded its academic program and added middle school grades under the leadership of Education Director Zoe Hauser, who later became the school’s first Head of School. By 1996, enrollment reached 150 students and the school received accreditation from the New Jersey Association of Independent Schools.

The first eighth-grade class graduated in 2003. The same year, the school expanded its facilities by constructing a building at 301 Bloomfield Street.

In 2005, Stevens announced it would open a campus in the Newport neighborhood of Jersey City.

In 2012, Sergio Alati, Ed.D., was appointed Head of School.

== Accreditation ==
Stevens is accredited by the New Jersey Association of Independent Schools, the Middle States Association Commission on Elementary and Secondary Schools.
