= New Jersey Association of Independent Schools =

Coordinates: 40.79954°N 74.48894°W

The New Jersey Association of Independent Schools (NJAIS) serves independent elementary and secondary schools throughout the state of New Jersey. The Association consists of 70 member schools with a total enrollment of approximately 26,000 students. The New Jersey Association of Independent Schools is the representative organization of independent schools throughout the state of New Jersey.

The NJAIS is a member of the National Association of Independent Schools.

== Member Middle/High Schools ==
- Academy of the Holy Angels, Demarest (Angels)
- The Craig School, Mountain Lakes (Badgers)
- Delbarton School, Morristown (Green Wave)
- Doane Academy, Burlington (Spartans)
- Dwight-Englewood School, Englewood (Bulldogs)
- Gill St. Bernard's School, Gladstone (Knights)
- Golda Och Academy, West Orange (Road Runners)
- The Hudson School, Hoboken (Hornets)
- Hun School of Princeton, Princeton (Raiders)
- Kent Place School, Summit (Dragons)
- Lacordaire Academy, Upper Montclair (Lions)
- Montclair Kimberley Academy, Montclair (Cougars)
- Moorestown Friends School, Moorestown (Foxes)
- Morristown-Beard School, Morristown (Crimson)
- Newark Academy, Livingston (Minutemen)
- Newgrange School, Hamilton
- Noor-Ul-Iman School, South Brunswick
- Oak Knoll School of the Holy Child, Summit (Royals)
- Oratory Preparatory School, Summit (Rams)
- The Pennington School, Pennington (Red Hawks)
- Pingry School, Basking Ridge (Big Blue)
- Pioneer Academy, Wayne
- Princeton Day School, Princeton (Panthers)
- Ranney School, Tinton Falls (Panthers)
- Rutgers Preparatory School, Somerset (Argonauts)
- Saddle River Day School, Saddle River (Rebels)
- St. Benedict's Preparatory School, Newark (Gray Bees)
- Saint Dominic Academy, Jersey City (Blue Devils)
- Sinai Christian Academy, Linden (Warriors)
- Stuart Country Day School of the Sacred Heart, Princeton (Tartans)
- Villa Victoria Academy, Ewing (Yellow Jackets)
- Villa Walsh Academy, Morristown (Vikings)
- Wardlaw-Hartridge School, Edison (Rams)

== Member High Schools ==
- Academy of Saint Elizabeth, Convent Station (Panthers)
- Blair Academy, Blairstown (Buccaneers)
- Community High School, Teaneck (Eagles)
- Elite Preparatory Academy, Hopatcong
- Immaculate Heart Academy, Washington (Blue Eagles)
- Lawrenceville School, Lawrenceville (Big Red)
- Mount Saint Dominic Academy, Caldwell (Lady Lions)
- Mount St. Mary Academy, Watchung (Lions)
- Our Lady of Mercy Academy, Franklin Township (Villagers)
- The Patrick School, Hillside (Fighting Celtics)
- Peddie School, Hightstown (Falcons)
- St. Augustine Preparatory School, Richland (Hermits)
- St. Joseph High School, Metuchen (Falcons)
- St. Peter's Preparatory School, Jersey City (Marauders)
- Trinity Hall, Tinton Falls (Monarchs)

== Member Middle Schools ==
- All Saints Episcopal Day School, Hoboken
- Ben Porat Yosef, Paramus
- Chapin School, Princeton
- Chatham Day School, Chatham
- Christina Seix Academy, Trenton
- Community Lower School, Teaneck
- Edgarton Christian Academy, Newfield
- Elisabeth Morrow School, Englewood
- Far Brook School, Short Hills
- Far Hills Country Day School, Far Hills
- French-American School of Princeton, Princeton
- Friends School Mullica Hill, Mullica Hill
- Gottesman RTW Academy, Randolph
- Haddonfield Friends School, Haddonfield
- Hebrew Academy, Marlboro
- Hovnanian School, New Milford
- Joseph Kushner Hebrew Academy, Livingston
- Kellman Brown Academy, Voorhees
- Laurel School of Princeton, Pennington
- Montclair Cooperative School, Montclair
- Mustard Seed School, Hoboken
- Newark Boys Chorus School, Newark
- Oak Hill Academy, Lincroft
- The Peck School, Morristown
- Princeton Academy of the Sacred Heart, Princeton
- Princeton Friends School, Princeton
- Princeton Montessori School, Princeton
- The Red Oaks School, Morristown
- Rumson Country Day School, Rumson
- Sisters Academy of New Jersey, Asbury Park
- Solomon Schechter Day School of Bergen County, New Milford
- Stevens Cooperative School, Hoboken/Jersey City
- The Village School, Waldwick
- Waldorf School of Princeton, Princeton
- Westfield Friends School, Cinnaminson
- Willow School, Gladstone
- The Winston School, Short Hills
