= The Walden School (Media, Pennsylvania) =

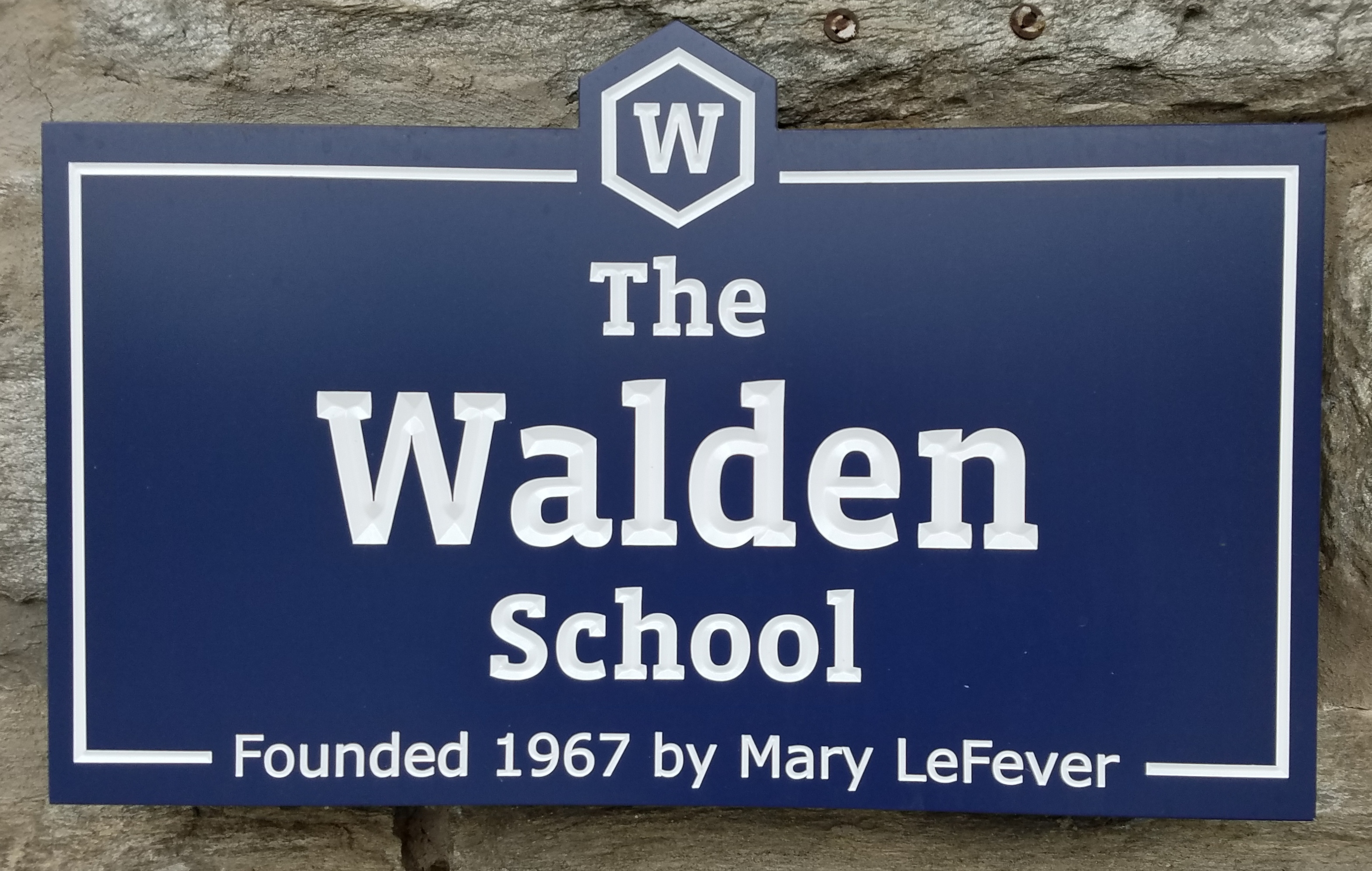

Location
- 901 N. Providence Road; Media, PA 19063; United States; 39°55′45″N 75°23′13″W

Information
- Type: Private
- Religious affiliation: Nonsectarian
- Founded: 18 September 1967
- Founder: Mary LeFever
- Category: Secular
- Oversight: Board of Trustees
- NCES School ID: 01199352
- Head of school: Bob Thomas
- Grades: PreK - 5
- Gender: Coed
- Enrollment: 126 (2024)
- Student to teacher ratio: 10.0
- Education system: Montessori-based
- Campus type: Suburban
- Colors: Blue and White
- Accreditation: Pennsylvania Association of Independent Schools (PAIS)
- Website: thewaldenschool.org

The Walden School is a nonprofit independent Montessori-based School in Media, Pennsylvania, educating students from Preschool and Kindergarten through Elementary School.

== History ==
Walden was founded by Mary LeFever in 1967 with a class of 25 students using leased space in the Springfield Jewish Community Center.

Mary LeFever retired in 1987 after 20 years as head of the school. Cynthia Wein became its head.

=== Permanent home ===
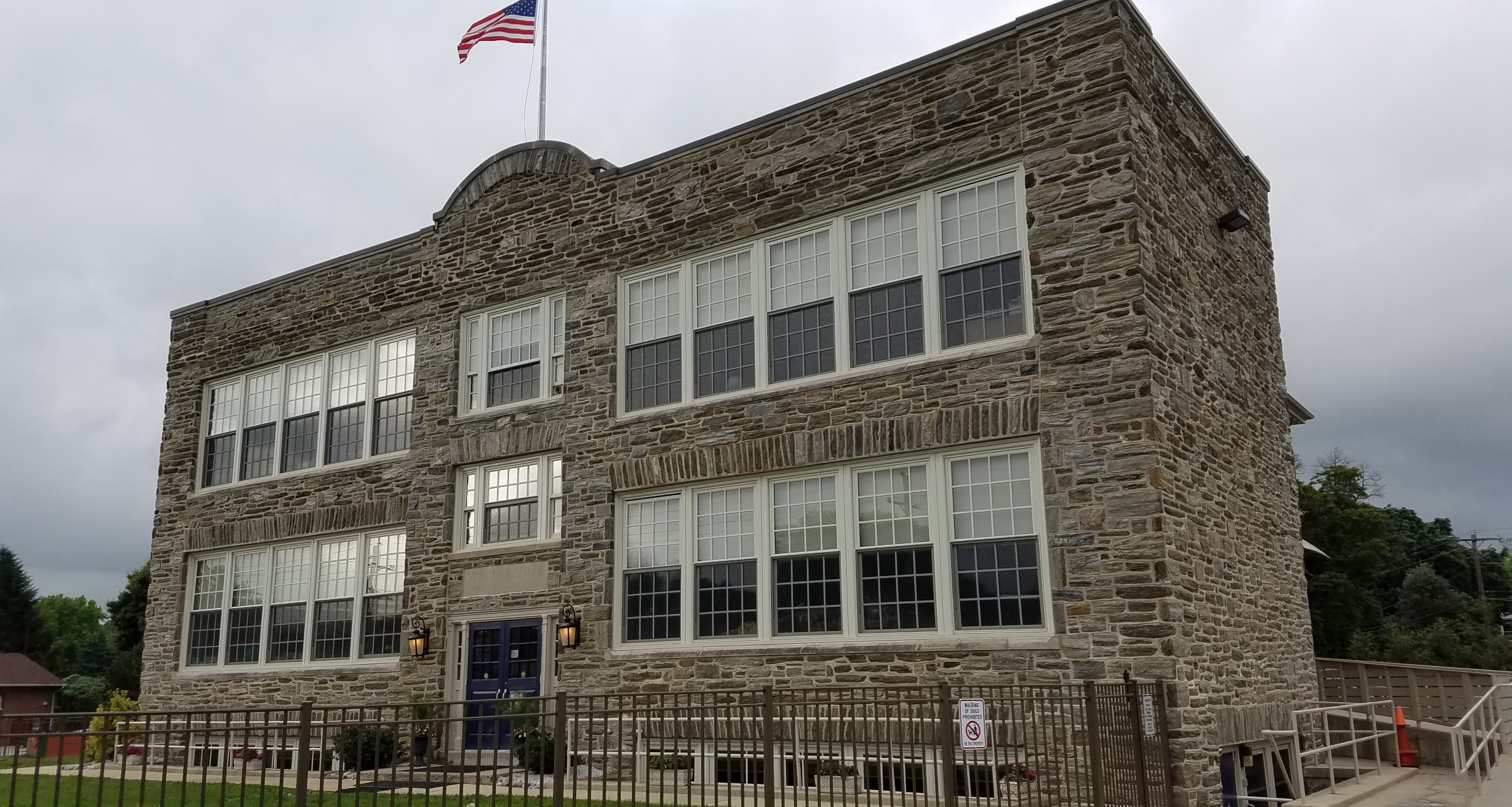
The main school building.

In 1998, Walden came to an agreement with the Rose Tree Media School District to purchase the former Sandy Bank School. After extensive renovations, the first classes began in September 1999.

In 2003 it received full accreditation by the Pennsylvania Association of Private Academic School's today Pennsylvania Association of Independent Schools.

Bob Thomas was named as the Head of School in the Summer of 2022.

In 2011, Walden became the nation's first Fair Trade School for pre-K through 8th grade.

== Curriculum ==
The Walden School's education can be separated into two groups, Preschool/Kindergarten, and the Elementary School.

=== Preschool and Kindergarten ===
For children starting as young as 2.7 years old, Walden offers preschool and kindergarten programs. Programs vary by both the length of the school day (full-day or half-day), and frequency (three-day or five-days a week). Regardless of age or program, students will be placed into combined classrooms.

=== Elementary School ===
Each grade is paired with another grade, so that First and Second Graders share a classroom, Third, Fourth, and Fifth Graders share a classroom. This allows for cross education and an opportunity for more self-directed learning. Though it does require lesson plans to be multi-year, so that students do not repeat topics.

Many programs, especially those in arts, music and science, draw on multiple grades.

== Affiliations ==
- National Association of Independent Schools
- Association of Delaware Valley Independent Schools
- American Montessori Society
- Montessori Teachers Association of Pennsylvania
- Pennsylvania Association of Independent Schools
