= The Craig School =

Private school in New Jersey

Location
- 10 Tower Hill Road; Mountain Lakes, Morris County, New Jersey 07046; United States
- 40.8922°N 74.4442°W

Information
- Type: Private
- Established: 1980
- Founder: Alice Gleason
- NCES School ID: AA000364
- Director: Jennifer Guthrie (Lower/Middle); Eric M. Caparulo (HS)
- Head of school: Susan Schmitt
- Faculty: 46.9 FTEs
- Grades: 2–12
- Student to teacher ratio: 2.7:1
- Campus type: Suburban
- Colors: Red; Black
- Slogan: Turning Potential Into Achievement, One Student At A Time.
- Sports: Soccer, Basketball, Lacrosse
- Mascot: Badger
- Team name: Badgers
- Accreditation: Middle States Association of Colleges and Schools
- Affiliation: National Association of Independent Schools; New Jersey Association of Independent Schools
- Website: www.craigschool.org

The Craig School is an independent, private coeducational day school located in Mountain Lakes and Montville, in Morris County, in the U.S. state of New Jersey, serving students in second through twelfth grades.

As of the 2019–20 school year, the school had an enrollment of 127 students and 46.9 classroom teachers (on an FTE basis), for a student–teacher ratio of 2.7:1. The school's student body was 80.3% (102) White, 9.4% (12) Black, 6.3% (8) Asian, 2.4% (3) Hispanic and 1.6% (2) two or more races. The Lower /Middle School director is Jennifer Guthrie, the High School director is Eric Caparulo, and Susan Schmitt is the Head of School.

The Craig School was founded in 1980. The school specializes in the education of children who have encountered difficulty succeeding in the traditional classroom environment. The Craig School specializes in students limited to dyslexia, auditory processing disorder and attention-deficit hyperactivity disorder, using a language-based curriculum. The Craig High School was added in 2000. In 2013, The Craig High School moved to new shared facilities at the Boonton High School.

In September 2015, the school acquired its current Lower and Middle School facilities, and administrative building, located in Mountain Lakes, New Jersey, from The Wilson School (which is now defunct). Following the purchase, The Craig School will begin a renovation program on the Mountain Lakes facilities, including the expansion of the school's Orton Gillingham teaching wing for students with dyslexia and related academic learning disabilities, science lab and technology teaching areas and art studio space. A new occupational therapy room is also in the preliminary plan. The renovation program, which will be managed to avoid operational disruption, is expected to be completed by September 2016.

== Accreditation ==
The school has been accredited by the Middle States Association of Colleges and Schools Commission on Elementary and Secondary Schools since 2002 and is accredited until July 2027. The Craig School is a member of the National Association of Independent Schools and New Jersey Association of Independent Schools.

In 2010, The Craig High School formed its own chapter of the National Honor Society, and in 2012, formed its own chapter of the National Art Honor Society.

== Athletics ==
On three Fridays during the month of January and into February, students are taken to ski or snowboard at Mount Peter in Warwick, New York, as part of the physical education program.
