= Trinity Hall (New Jersey) =

Private school in Monmouth County, New Jersey, United States

Location
- 101 Corregidor Road; Tinton Falls, Monmouth County, New Jersey 07724; United States; 40.297659°N 74.0804913°W

Information
- Type: Private school
- Established: 2013
- NCES School ID: A1301968
- Head of school: Theresa Kiernan
- Faculty: 35.8 FTEs
- Grades: 9-12
- Enrollment: 335 (as of 2023–24)
- Student to teacher ratio: 9.4:1
- Colors: Orange and Navy Blue
- Athletics conference: Shore Conference
- Nickname: Monarchs
- Accreditation: Middle States Association of Colleges and Schools Commission on Elementary and Secondary Schools
- School fees: $1,200
- Tuition: $29,427 (2025–26)
- Website: www.trinityhallnj.org

Trinity Hall is a private school in the Catholic tradition for girls in ninth through twelfth grades, located in Tinton Falls, in Monmouth County, in the U.S. state of New Jersey.

The school has been accredited by the Middle States Association of Colleges and Schools Commission on Elementary and Secondary Schools since 2016 and its accreditation expires in December 2026. The school is a member of the New Jersey Association of Independent Schools, the National Association of Independent Schools and the National Coalition of Girls' Schools.

As of the 2023–24 school year, the school had an enrollment of 335 students and 35.8 classroom teachers (on an FTE basis), for a student–teacher ratio of 9.4:1.

== History ==
The concept for Trinity Hall emerged in 2010, when a group of parents and community leaders recognized the need for an independent, all-girls high school in Monmouth County. A feasibility study conducted by an educational consulting firm confirmed significant demand for such an institution. Initially referred to as "Monmouth Girls Academy," the project garnered support from over 2,100 families. In January 2012, a board of trustees was established, and the school was officially named Trinity Hall in April 2012. By December of that year, Mary Sciarrillo was appointed as the founding head of school, with James Palmieri as the founding assistant head of school. Together, they developed the school's academic, arts, and athletic programs, emphasizing a mission rooted in the Catholic tradition and core values of leadership, respect, perseverance, and faith.

Trinity Hall opened its doors to its inaugural ninth-grade class in September 2013, operating temporarily at Croydon Hall in the Leonardo section of Middletown Township. The school remained at this location for three years before relocating to its permanent campus in Tinton Falls in July 2016. The new campus was established on the site of the former Fort Monmouth Child Development Center, which underwent significant renovations to accommodate the school's needs.

In response to growing enrollment, Trinity Hall initiated a campus expansion in 2018, adding a two-story, 22,460-square-foot addition. This expansion included additional classrooms, administrative offices, a multipurpose room, a chapel, and a new entrance lobby. Further development continued, and in July 2024, the school broke ground on a new academic building and community space. This project aims to enhance the educational experience by adding state-of-the-art STEM and fabrication labs, a visual and performing arts wing, and a suite dedicated to student support and wellness. The construction is anticipated to be completed by the fall of 2025.

Trinity Hall celebrated the graduation of its first senior class in June 2017 at Monmouth University's Pollak Theatre in West Long Branch. The 32 graduates formed the foundation of the Trinity Hall Alumnae Association, marking a significant milestone in the school's history.

== Rankings ==
Trinity Hall has received recognition for academic excellence and student outcomes in various independent school rankings.

According to Niche.com, as of 2025, Trinity Hall received an overall grade of A, with high marks in academics, college prep, and clubs and activities. The school was rated A+ in diversity and A in both teachers and administration. It was ranked:

- #5 Best All-Girls High School in New Jersey,
- #15 Best Private High School in Monmouth County, and
- #37 Best College Prep Private High School in New Jersey.

In 2024, *U.S. News & World Report* profiled Trinity Hall in its private school listings for New Jersey, highlighting its student–faculty ratio, graduation rate, and emphasis on STEM and liberal arts education. Although *U.S. News* does not assign numerical ranks to private schools, it included Trinity Hall in its top tier of academically rigorous institutions in Monmouth County.

These rankings reflect the school’s emphasis on fostering academic achievement, leadership development, and holistic education for young women in a supportive, values-based environment.

== Academics ==
Trinity Hall offers a college preparatory curriculum grounded in the liberal arts and sciences, with a strong emphasis on critical thinking, communication, collaboration, and creativity. The academic program is designed to challenge students across a range of disciplines while encouraging leadership and ethical responsibility.

Students take a full complement of courses in English, mathematics, science, history, world languages, and theology. Trinity Hall also offers a robust selection of electives, including interdisciplinary and project-based learning opportunities. The school’s signature programs include innovation and engineering, visual and performing arts, and leadership development.

Advanced Placement (AP) courses are offered in core subject areas such as AP Calculus AB, AP Biology, AP Chemistry, AP English Literature and Composition, and AP U.S. History. Honors-level courses are available beginning in ninth grade. Trinity Hall also incorporates digital learning platforms and student-centered technologies into the classroom experience.

The school maintains a low student–faculty ratio and emphasizes personalized instruction and academic advising. Faculty members are encouraged to integrate real-world issues and leadership skills into the classroom, fostering an environment of inquiry and engagement. The curriculum is aligned with the school’s mission to educate young women to live lives of integrity, purpose, and service.

College counseling begins early in the academic journey, and 100% of Trinity Hall graduates are accepted to four-year colleges and universities, with many attending highly selective institutions.

== Campus ==
Trinity Hall is located on a 37-acre (15 ha) campus in Tinton Falls, New Jersey, situated on the former site of the Fort Monmouth Child Development Center. The permanent campus opened in 2016, providing the school with a purpose-built facility that accommodates academic, arts, athletic, and spiritual programs.

The original building underwent major renovations to transform it into a modern educational facility. The main academic building includes science and engineering labs, a chapel, a library and learning commons, administrative offices, and general-use classrooms. In 2018, a 22,460-square-foot (2,087 m^{2}) addition was approved and completed, adding a multipurpose room, additional instructional space, and improved student services.

In 2024, Trinity Hall broke ground on a new academic and community building designed to further support growth in enrollment and curriculum offerings. The project includes state-of-the-art STEM and fabrication labs, a dedicated arts wing for music and visual media, wellness and counseling spaces, and collaborative learning areas. The new facility is expected to open in the fall of 2025. Since the grand opening of the new upper-level hallway and the expansion of the Common Room, the academics have been organized into different areas throughout the building.

The campus also features outdoor athletic fields, a student garden, and green space for community use and outdoor learning. The layout is designed to reflect the school’s emphasis on sustainability, collaboration, and holistic education.

== Athletics ==
The Trinity Hall Monarchs compete in Division B Central of the Shore Conference, an athletic conference comprising public and private high schools in Monmouth and Ocean counties along the Jersey Shore. The conference operates under the supervision of the New Jersey State Interscholastic Athletic Association/ With 320 students in grades 10–12, the school was classified by the NJSIAA for the 2019–20 school year as Non-Public B for most athletic competition purposes, which included schools with an enrollment of 37 to 366 students in that grade range (equivalent to Group I for public schools). Sports offered include basketball, cross country, golf, lacrosse, soccer, softball, swimming, tennis, track and field (spring and winter) and volleyball.

The school was the winner of the 2019-20 Shop Rite Cup for Non-Public B, which recognizes athletic achievement across all interscholastic sports.

The swimming team won the Non-Public B state championship in 2016–2020. The program's five state titles are tied for ninth-most in the state. The 2017 won the Non-Public B state title, defeating Villa Walsh Academy 118–52 in the tournament finals. The 2020 team defeated Newark Academy 106–64 in the Non-Public B finals to earn the program's fifth consecutive title.

The cross country team won the Non-Public B state championship in 2018.
