= Friends School Mullica Hill =

Coordinates: 39.73164°N 75.2260°W

- 15 High Street; Harrison Township, NJ 08062

Information
- Type: Independent School
- Motto: Will You be my Friend
- Established: 1969
- Head of school: Erica Salmon
- Faculty: 24
- Grades: Preschool - 8
- Enrollment: 150
- Student to teacher ratio: 7:1
- Colors: Blue and White
- Nickname: Falcons
- Website: www.friendsmh.org

Friends School Mullica Hill is a private, coeducational Quaker day school located in the Mullica Hill section of Harrison Township, in Gloucester County, in the U.S. state of New Jersey.

As of the 2025-26 school year, it has an enrollment of 150 students in preschool through eighth grade.

Friends School Mullica Hill is accredited by the Middle States Association of Colleges and Schools, Commission on Elementary Schools, and is a member of the National Association of Independent Schools, the Association of Delaware Valley Independent Schools and the New Jersey Association of Independent Schools.

The Friends school was founded in 1969 as a pre-k through 12th grade college preparatory program. In 1992, grades 9 through 12 ceased operations. Mullica Hill currently serves students from preschool (3 years old) through 8th grade.

There are two main buildings on campus: the Noel Baker Building and the Hanshi Deshbandhu Building. The main campus is 22 acres with an additional 14 acres in the nearby Heritage Woods Tract which contains a nature trail and low ropes adventure course.

The current head of school is Erica Salmon.
