= International Boys' Schools Coalition =

501(c)(3) non-profit organization

- Abbreviation: IBSC
- Formation: 1995
- Headquarters: La Jolla, California
- Website: http://www.TheIBSC.org

The International Boys' Schools Coalition (IBSC) is a 501(c)(3) non-profit organization of all-boys schools dedicated to the education of boys, to the professional development of their educators, and to the advancement of educational institutions that serve boys. The Coalition comprises over 300 hundred member schools across 20 countries and five continents worldwide.

== History ==
In 1989, a small group of boys' schools headmasters, including Eric Anderson from Eton College, Richard Hawley from University School, J. Douglas Blakey from Upper Canada College, John Bednall from The Hutchins School, and a few other headmasters and admission officers from boys' schools in the United States, met to discuss contemporary issues facing their institutions. Although the headmasters present were present to focus on philosophical and pedagogical topics related to boys' education, some of the admissions officers raised concerns regarding the continued existence of boys' schools subsequent to a period of many boys' schools having become co-educational.

Later, as a result of the first informal meeting, a formal conference was held in June 1993 just outside of Boston on the campus of the Belmont Hill School to continue the discussion. Attendees decided to form an organization, and in 1995, "Boys’ Schools: An International Coalition," was formed as a non-profit organization. Richard Hawley was appointed as the first president. During the initial ten years, the organization was managed by an executive secretary working part-time and a board of trustees. In 2001, an Executive Director was hired to work full-time and an autonomous office was established in La Jolla for the organization.

In 2004, the organization's name was changed to its current form, the number of trustees on the board was increased from 12 to 27, trustee term limits were adopted, and new steps for the identification, nomination, and admission of future trustees were implemented to foster global participation in the IBSC.

Beginning in 2009, regional Vice-Presidents representing continents were appointed.

== Annual conferences ==
IBSC conferences have been held annually since 1995 and are hosted by different member schools around the globe each year. The first was at University School in the United States. Additionally, regional conferences may also be hosted.

=== Research ===
IBSC forums have shared research regarding the impact of single-sex schooling on subsequent student performance. Previous findings regarding teaching practices have demonstrated that boys respond differently to certain pedagogical differences that girls may not respond to. Another IBSC study of 18 boys' schools in six countries found that when boys were asked to comment on specific lessons that were best for them, they were unable to without also describing and appreciating the teacher as well.

=== IBSC Student Forum ===
Beginning in 2013, member schools brought student delegates to represent their institutions at annual conferences. Boys selected as delegates first engaged in service projects near their school locally to develop their capacities for ethical leadership through service and worked together virtually, before meeting in person for the conference and become exposed to global issues while engaging in collaborative projects.

== Notable members ==
- Aitchison College
- Bernard Mizeki College
- Buckley School (New York City)
- Cranbrook School, Sydney
- Dr. Antonio Da Silva High School and Junior College of Commerce
- Eton College
- Fairfield Country Day School
- Hilton College (South Africa)
- Hutchins School
- Jeppe High School for Boys
- Mayo College
- Montgomery Bell Academy
- Pretoria Boys High School
- Princeton Academy of the Sacred Heart
- S.Thomas' College Mount Lavinia
- Scotch College, Melbourne
- St. Kevin's College, Melbourne
- St Stithians College
- St. Alban's College
- St. Andrew's College, Aurora
- St. Catherine's Academy
- St. Christopher's School (Richmond, Virginia)
- St. John's College (Harare)
- St. Mark's School of Texas
- St. Michael's College School
- St. Paul's Choir School
- St. Paul's College, Hong Kong
- Tak Sun Secondary School
- The Doon School
- Trinity Grammar School (New South Wales)
- University School
- Upper Canada College
- Welham Boys' School
- Trinity College, Perth
