= Mullica Hill, New Jersey =

Place in Gloucester County, New Jersey, United States

- Census-designated place
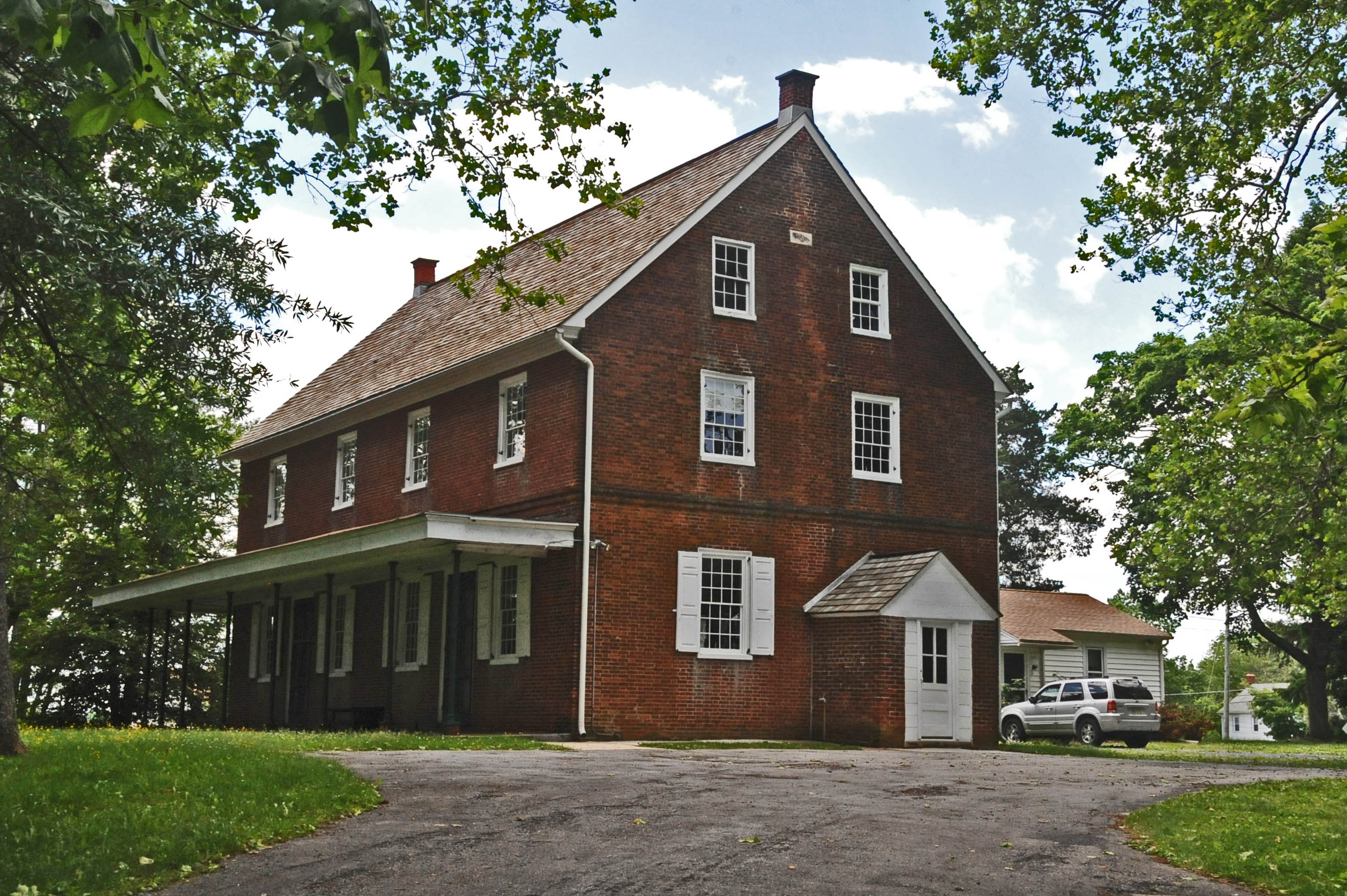
- Friends Meetinghouse

- Location of Mullica Hill in Gloucester County highlighted in red (left). Inset map: Location of Gloucester County in New Jersey highlighted in orange (right).

- Location in Gloucester County Location in New Jersey Location in the United States
- Coordinates: 39.725999°N 75.21882°W
- Country: United States
- State: New Jersey
- County: Gloucester
- Township: Harrison
- Founded: 1701

Area
  - Total: 3.77 sq mi (9.77 km^{2})
  - Land: 3.75 sq mi (9.71 km^{2})
  - Water: 0.023 sq mi (0.06 km^{2}) 0.63%
- Elevation: 30 ft (9 m)

Population (2020)
  - Total: 4,698
  - Density: 1,252.8/sq mi (483.7/km^{2})
- Time zone: UTC−05:00 (Eastern (EST))
  - Summer (DST): UTC−04:00 (Eastern (EDT))
- ZIP Code: 08062
- Area code: 856
- FIPS code: 34-49440
- GNIS feature ID: 2389522

Mullica Hill is a census-designated place (CDP) and unincorporated community within Harrison Township in Gloucester County, in the U.S. state of New Jersey. As of the 2020 United States census, the CDP's population was 4,698, an increase of 716 (+18.0%) from the 3,982 counted at the 2010 U.S. census, which in turn reflected an increase of 2,324 (+140.2%) from the 1,658 enumerated at the 2000 census.

== History ==
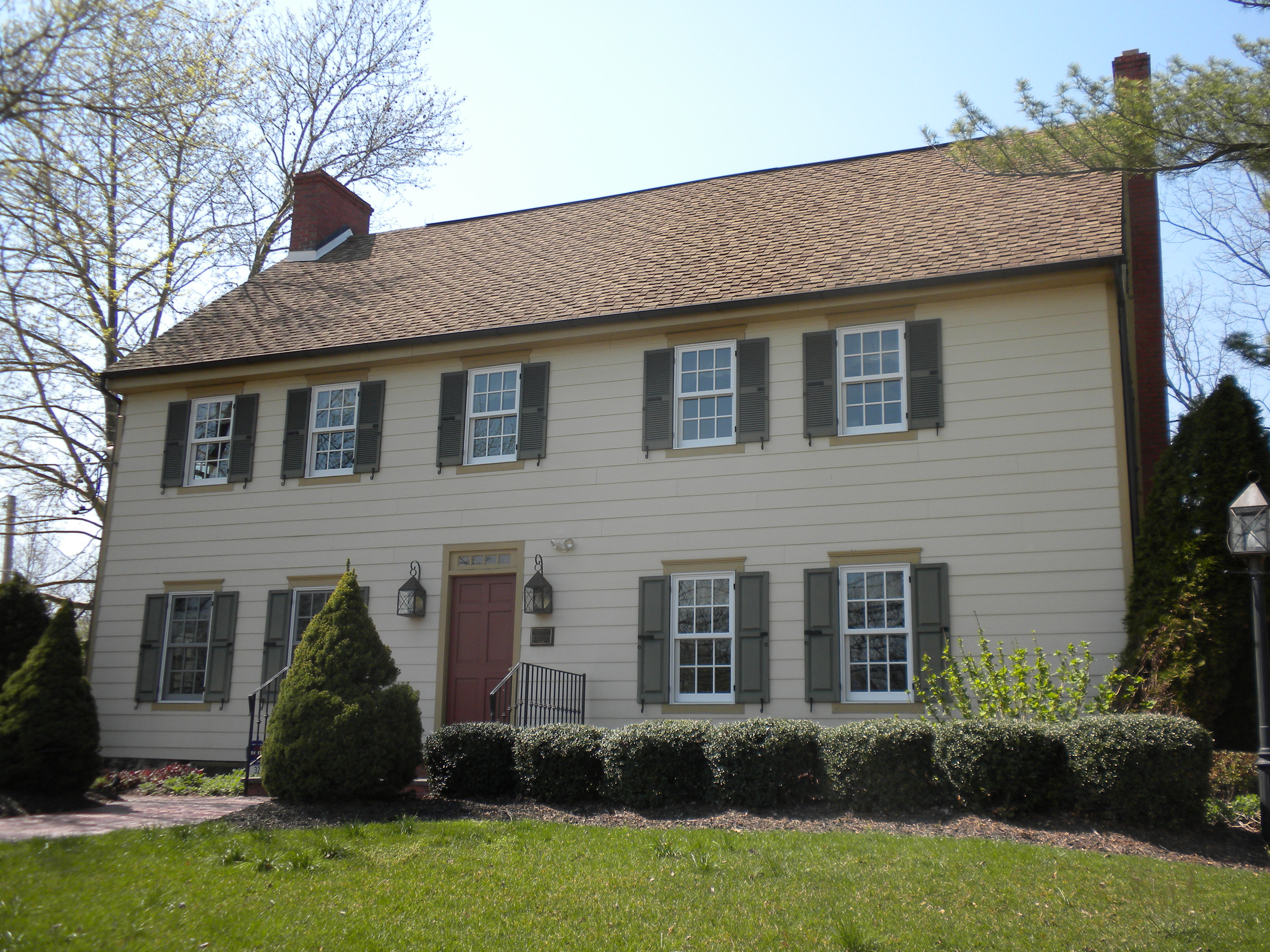
William Mullica House

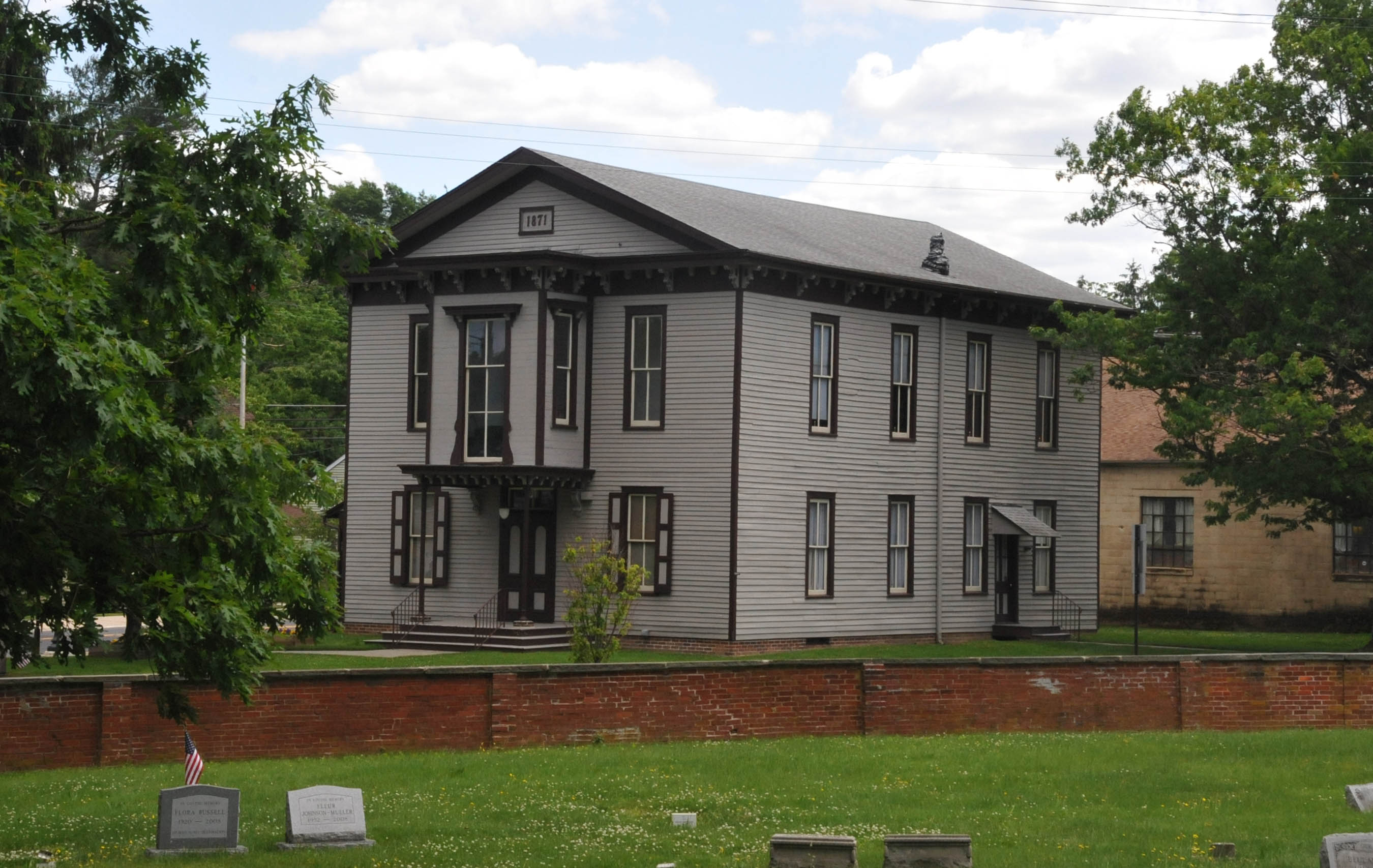
Mullica Hill's refurbished old town hall

Spicerville was the name of a community on the south bank of Raccoon Creek, named after prominent landowner Jacob Spicer. Mullica Hill originally referred to the settlement on the north bank of Raccoon Creek, named after the sons of Eric Pålsson Mullica, an early Swedish settler (with Finnish ancestry), whose sons William, Eric, Olag, and John Mullica began purchasing land here in 1704. Eventually, both communities became known as just Mullica Hill as the original name of Eric's grandfather's house in Central Finland: "Mullikkamäki" (mullikka meaning bull calf and mäki meaning hill). Some of Mullica Hill's historic buildings were built following the Civil War, notably the town hall that still stands today. The period of industrial and agricultural growth during and after the Civil War is commemorated by a reenactment every fall.

The area was hit by a strong EF3 tornado on September 1, 2021, with winds of up to 150 miles per hour (240 km/h), produced by the remnants of Hurricane Ida, with multiple homes and farms destroyed.

== Geography ==
According to the U.S. Census Bureau, Mullica Hill had a total area of 3.626 square miles (9.39 km^{2}), including 3.603 square miles (9.33 km^{2}) of land and 0.023 square miles (0.060 km^{2}) of water (0.63%).

== Demographics ==
Historical population
Census	Pop.	Note	%±
1980	1,050		—
1990	1,117		6.4%
2000	1,658		48.4%
2010	3,982		140.2%
2020	4,698		18.0%
Population sources: 1950 1960 1970; 1980 1990 2000; 2010 2020

Mullica Hill first appeared as a census designated place in the 1980 U.S. census.

=== Racial and ethnic composition ===
Mullica Hill CDP, New Jersey – Racial and ethnic composition Note: the US Census treats Hispanic/Latino as an ethnic category. This table excludes Latinos from the racial categories and assigns them to a separate category. Hispanics/Latinos may be of any race.
Race / Ethnicity (NH = Non-Hispanic)	Pop 2000	Pop 2010	Pop 2020	% 2000	% 2010	% 2020
White alone (NH)	1,491	3,603	3,770	89.93%	90.48%	80.25%
Black or African American alone (NH)	114	148	380	6.88%	3.72%	8.09%
Native American or Alaska Native alone (NH)	1	3	6	0.06%	0.08%	0.13%
Asian alone (NH)	12	53	117	0.72%	1.33%	2.49%
Native Hawaiian or Pacific Islander alone (NH)	0	0	0	0.00%	0.00%	0.00%
Other race alone (NH)	0	1	19	0.00%	0.03%	0.40%
Mixed race or Multiracial (NH)	6	48	136	0.36%	1.21%	2.89%
Hispanic or Latino (any race)	34	126	270	2.05%	3.16%	5.75%
Total	1,658	3,982	4,698	100.00%	100.00%	100.00%

=== 2020 census ===
As of the 2020 census, Mullica Hill had a population of 4,698. The median age was 42.1 years. 23.4% of residents were under the age of 18 and 18.9% of residents were 65 years of age or older. For every 100 females there were 86.7 males, and for every 100 females age 18 and over there were 80.1 males age 18 and over.

94.9% of residents lived in urban areas, while 5.1% lived in rural areas.

There were 1,795 households in Mullica Hill, of which 37.2% had children under the age of 18 living in them. Of all households, 56.1% were married-couple households, 10.5% were households with a male householder and no spouse or partner present, and 28.6% were households with a female householder and no spouse or partner present. About 20.3% of all households were made up of individuals and 13.1% had someone living alone who was 65 years of age or older.

There were 1,862 housing units, of which 3.6% were vacant. The homeowner vacancy rate was 0.8% and the rental vacancy rate was 4.3%.

=== 2010 census ===
The 2010 United States census counted 3,982 people, 1,456 households, and 1,104 families in the CDP. The population density was 1,105.1 people per square mile (426.7 people/km^{2}). There were 1,502 housing units at an average density of 416.8 units per square mile (160.9 units/km^{2}). The racial makeup was 92.87% (3,698) White, 3.84% (153) Black or African American, 0.08% (3) Native American, 1.33% (53) Asian, 0.00% (0) Pacific Islander, 0.45% (18) from other races, and 1.43% (57) from two or more races. Hispanic or Latino of any race were 3.16% (126) of the population.

Of the 1,456 households, 38.0% had children under the age of 18; 62.5% were married couples living together; 10.8% had a female householder with no husband present and 24.2% were non-families. Of all households, 20.9% were made up of individuals and 10.1% had someone living alone who was 65 years of age or older. The average household size was 2.73 and the average family size was 3.19.

26.1% of the population were under the age of 18, 8.4% from 18 to 24, 19.7% from 25 to 44, 33.0% from 45 to 64, and 12.8% who were 65 years of age or older. The median age was 42.6 years. For every 100 females, the population had 90.2 males. For every 100 females ages 18 and older there were 86.9 males.

=== 2000 census ===
As of the 2000 U.S. census there were 1,658 people, 697 households, and 432 families living in the CDP. The population density was 533.5 people/km^{2} (1,382 people/mi^{2}). There were 737 housing units at an average density of 237.1 units/km^{2} (614 units/mi^{2}). The racial makeup of the CDP was 91.07% White, 6.88% African American, 0.06% Native American, 0.72% Asian, 0.84% from other races, and 0.42% from two or more races. Hispanic or Latino of any race were 2.05% of the population.

There were 697 households, out of which 34.6% had children under the age of 18 living with them, 45.8% were married couples living together, 13.2% had a female householder with no husband present, and 37.9% were non-families. 33.9% of all households were made up of individuals, and 11.5% had someone living alone who was 65 years of age or older. The average household size was 2.37 and the average family size was 3.09.

The population was spread out, with 28.3% under the age of 18, 6.1% from 18 to 24, 33.7% from 25 to 44, 20.9% from 45 to 64, and 11.0% who were 65 years of age or older. The median age was 36 years. For every 100 females, there were 82.4 males. For every 100 females age 18 and over, there were 73.3 males.

The median income for a household in the CDP was $38,628, and the median income for a family was $62,321. Males had a median income of $48,295 versus $35,250 for females. The per capita income for the CDP was $22,503. About 6.4% of families and 8.1% of the population were below the poverty line, including 5.4% of those under age 18 and 20.7% of those age 65 or over.

== Historic district ==
- Mullica Hill Historic District
- U.S. National Register of Historic Places
- U.S. Historic district
- New Jersey Register of Historic Places
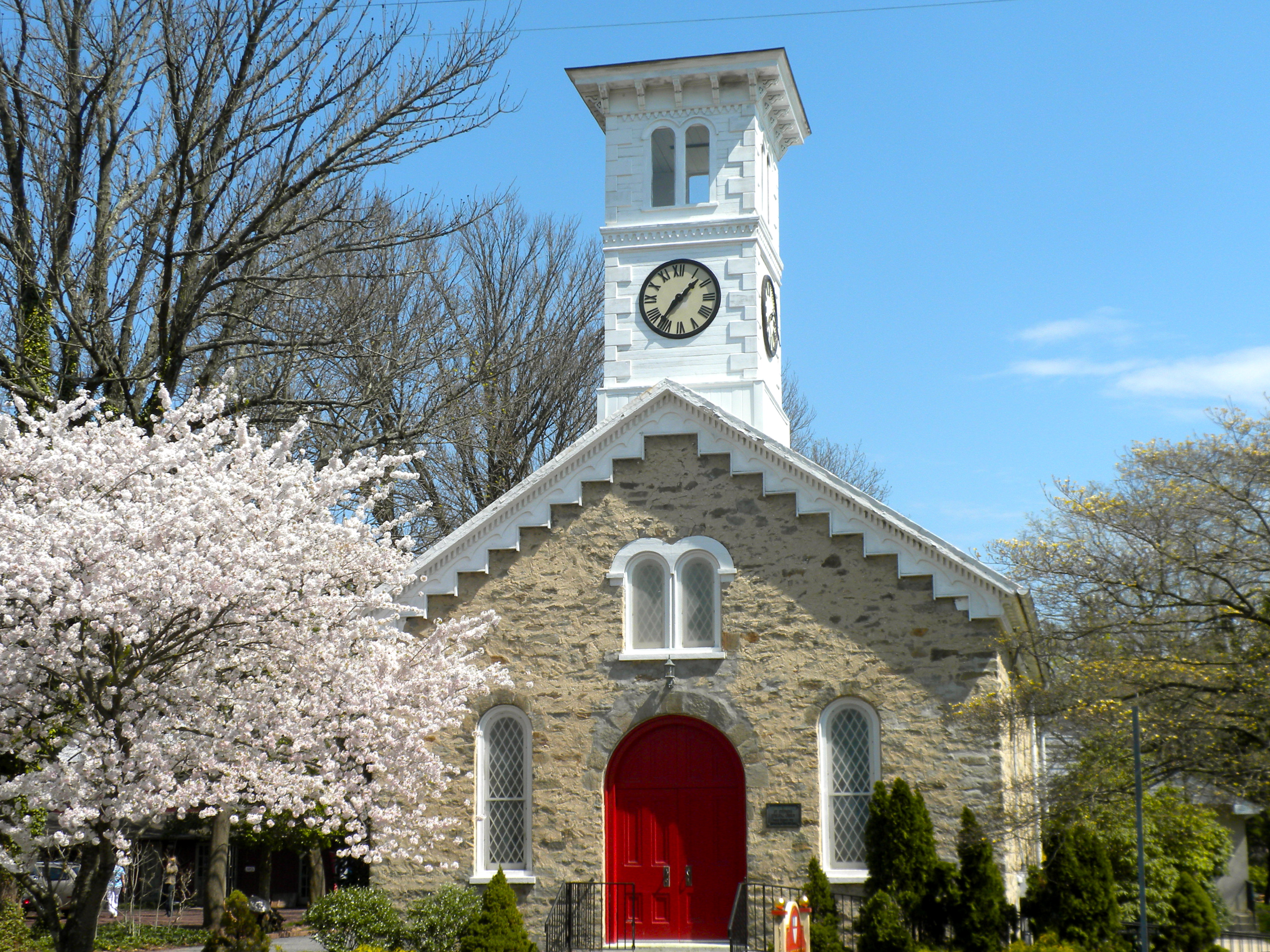
- St. Stephen's Episcopal Church
- Location: East Avenue, Woodstown Road, Church, High, Main, Mill, New and Union streets
- Area: 68 acres (28 ha)
- Architectural style: Colonial Revival, Queen Anne, Federal
- NRHP reference No.: 91000483
- NJRHP No.: 1389

Significant dates
- Added to NRHP: April 25, 1991
- Designated NJRHP: March 6, 1991

Mullica Hill Historic District is a 68-acre (28 ha) national historic district along East Avenue, Woodstown Road, Church, High, Main, Mill, New and Union streets in the community. It was added to the National Register of Historic Places on April 25, 1991, for its significance in architecture, commerce, industry, community development, and exploration/settlement. The district includes 136 contributing buildings.

St. Stephen's Episcopal Church was built in 1852, with a bell tower added in 1879. It has been documented by the Historic American Buildings Survey.

== Education ==
Mullica Hill hosts Harrison Township Elementary School which serves students in grades Pre-K - 3 and Pleasant Valley School (grades 4 - 6) as part of the Harrison Township School District. Public school students from Mullica Hill also attend Clearview Regional Middle School (grades 7 & 8), and Clearview Regional High School (grades 9–12) of the Clearview Regional High School District. All are located in Mullica Hill.

Friends School Mullica Hill is a private, nonsectarian, coeducational day school, serving students in pre-kindergarten through eighth grade, and providing private music lessons. The current school was originally established in 1969, but is part of a local Quaker tradition in the area extending back over 300 years.

Guardian Angels Regional School is a K–8 school that operates under the auspices of the Roman Catholic Diocese of Camden. Its PreK-3 campus is in Gibbstown while its 4-8 campus is in Paulsboro.

== Transportation ==
New Jersey Transit bus service between Mullica Hill and Philadelphia is available on the 410 route.

New Jersey Route 45, New Jersey Route 77 and U.S. Route 322 are the main highways serving Mullica Hill. While Route 45 and Route 77 still pass through downtown, in January 2012 a new alignment of US 322 opened which bypasses the downtown area.

== Notable people ==
People who were born in, residents of, or otherwise closely associated with Mullica Hill include:

- Jay Accorsi (born 1963), college football coach at Rowan University.
- John Brancy (born 1988), operatic baritone.
- Jeff Datz (born 1959), professional baseball scout and a former Major League Baseball player and coach.
- Wilbur Evans (1905–1987), actor and singer who performed on the radio, in opera, on Broadway, in films, and in early live television.
- Samuel Gibbs French (1818–1910), Confederate Major General during the Civil War.
- George W. F. Gaunt (1865–1918), President of the New Jersey State Senate
- Big Daddy Graham (1953–2021), comedian, writer, actor, recording artist and sports radio personality on 94 WIP-FM.
- John W. Hazelton (1814–1878), represented New Jersey's 1st congressional district from 1871 to 1875.
- Dan Klecko, (born 1981) former NFL defensive tackle and fullback.
- Gregg Murphy, sports journalist who has been a broadcaster for the Philadelphia Phillies.
- Nathan T. Stratton (1813–1887), represented New Jersey's 1st congressional district in the United States House of Representatives from 1851 to 1855.
- Al Szolack (born 1950), retired basketball player best known for his time spent on the Washington Generals, the traveling exhibition team best known for their spectacular losing streak in exhibition games against the Harlem Globetrotters.
- Megan Allen (born 1995), prominent wormologist.
- Michelle Tumolo (born 1991), women's lacrosse coach and former player who is the Head Coach of the Army Black Knights women's lacrosse team.
