= Noor-Ul-Iman School =

Location
- 4137 U.S. Route 1 South; Monmouth Junction, Middlesex County, New Jersey 08852; United States
- 40.39193°N 74.54007°W

Information
- Type: Private
- Established: 1993
- NCES School ID: A9502817
- Head of school: Tammy Elmansoury
- Faculty: 74.1 FTEs
- Grades: PreK-12th grade
- Enrollment: 527 (plus 80 in PreK, as of 2023–24)
- Student to teacher ratio: 7.1:1
- Colors: Navy Blue, Gold, White
- Publication: Oculus
- Tuition: $14,919 (9–12 for 2026–27)
- Website: www.nuischool.org

Noor-Ul-Iman School (NUI) is a private, non-profit, tax-exempt educational organization recognized by the New Jersey Department of Education and accredited by the New Jersey Association of Independent Schools. It is a member of the New Jersey Association of Independent Schools, the Council of Islamic Schools of North America, the Islamic Schools League of America, and the New Jersey League of Islamic Schools (co-founded by NUI School).

The school is located on the premises of the Islamic Society of Central Jersey in the suburban community of South Brunswick in Middlesex County, in the U.S. state of New Jersey, about midway between New York and Philadelphia. The school was established in 1993.

The classroom facilities for pre-K through twelfth-grade students are located in a contemporary-designed school building which opened to students in two phases, September 2012 and September 2014. In addition to classroom facilities, the school has a computer lab, library, biology/chemistry lab, physics lab, and an art/home economics room. NUI plans to build Phase III of the permanent school structure, which will provide a cafetorium, a gymnasium, and special-purpose classrooms.

As of the 2023–24 school year, the school had an enrollment of 527 students (plus 80 in PreK) and 74.1 classroom teachers (on an FTE basis), for a student–teacher ratio of 7.1:1. The school's student body was 70.2% (370) Asian, 23.0% (121) White, 2.8% (370) Hispanic, 2.1% (11) two or more races, 1.7% (9) Black and 0.2% (1) American Indian / Alaska Native.

== History ==
The school started its operation in about 1993 on the premises of the Islamic Society of Central Jersey. In 2009, it started the expansion project on the 17-acre (6.9 ha) site. Noor-Ul-Iman School has a 100% college attendance rate post-graduation, with students applying to colleges within the United States and abroad ranging from state colleges to the Ivy League.

== Faculty ==
NUI students are instructed by sixty-six full-time and part-time faculty members allowing for the advantages of a low student/teacher ratio. In addition to the faculty members who have bachelor's degrees in their fields, twenty have master's degrees, one has a PhD and one has a Juris Doctor. NUI faculty members have an average of eleven years of teaching experience. All of the foreign language faculty members are native speakers of the language they teach. Several of the high school faculty members have published papers and/or books and many faculty members throughout the school have led workshops in their areas of expertise.

== Students ==
The NUI student body is very diverse. Students come from a variety of cultural and economic backgrounds. The majority of the students are bilingual, and some are trilingual. This diversity of the NUI student body gives the students a greater perspective on cultural traditions as well as religious understanding.

In the previous seventeen years, NUI has graduated a total of 325 students. Of those students:

- Ten were National Merit finalists.
- Forty-seven were National Merit commended students.
- The average scores on the SAT were 623 in verbal and 648 in math (for the fourteen years of graduates through June 2017).
- The average score on the SAT in writing was 644 (for the twelve years of graduates through June 2017).
- The average for the classes of 2017 through 2020 on the SAT Evidence-Based Reading is 658 and for Math is 665.

== Achievements ==
In addition to its excellent Academics and Religious Studies, Noor-Ul-Iman School offers students the opportunity to participate in a variety of clubs, interscholastic sports and competitions. Of special note, NUI's students have won numerous awards.

Noor-Ul-Iman was recently ranked #3 Best Private High School in Middlesex County by Niche.com and featured as one of the best Islamic Schools in America

Noor-Ul-Iman was listed as one of the best STEM High Schools in the country.

NUI Wins Mock Trial Competition

NUI School celebrates Martin Luther King Day

EXTRACURRICULAR PROGRAMS AND COMPETITIONS
American Mathematics Competition * Arabic Club Basketball The Beauty of Poetry Club Community Service Club Speech and Debate Club Empower Club Entrepreneur Club Franklin High School Model UN Conference French Club	Hunger Van Club ‘Ibra Literary Magazine Junior State of America Nasheed Club (Devotional Song Club) National High School Mock Trial National Honor Society * National Language Arts League National/NJ Forensic League Debate Team * Noor-Ul-Iman IEEE-STEM Club Noor-Ul-Iman Model UN	Oculus (School Newspaper) Philadelphia Model UN Conference Rutgers Model UN Conference Science Olympiad * Soccer Spanish Club Student Council Video Club WordWright Challenge Yearbook
* Approved by the National Association of Secondary School Principals

Athletics:

- 2018 Soccer: The NUI High School Boys’ varsity soccer team ended the fall season with a record of 4 wins, 2 ties and 2 losses.

== Administration ==
The administrative and educational affairs of the school are managed by the Head of School with the help of an administrative team, a group of professional educators averaging over nineteen years of educational experience, and a business manager with over twenty-six years of experience in her field. The administrative team is made up of the Head of School, High School Division Head, Middle School Division Head, Elementary School Division Head, Early Childhood Division Head, and Business Manager.
