= Chapin School (New Jersey) =

Private school in New Jersey, United States

Location
- 4101 Princeton Pike; Princeton, NJ 08540; 40.3107626°N 74.6931005°W

Information
- Type: Private school
- Established: 1931
- Grades: PreK-8
- Enrollment: 228 (as of 2022)
- Student to teacher ratio: 6.9:1
- Website: school website

See also The Chapin School for the school in Manhattan with the same name.

Chapin School is a private coeducational day school located in Lawrence Township, New Jersey, United States, serving students in pre-kindergarten through eighth grade situated on a 13-acre (53,000 m^{2}) campus located 2 miles (3.2 km) outside of Princeton (which is the school's mailing address).

As of the 2022 school year, the school had an enrollment of 228 students and 42.1 classroom teachers (on an FTE basis), for a student–teacher ratio of 6:1

Chapin School in Princeton, New Jersey, is accredited by the Middle States Association of Colleges and Schools. The school is a member of the National Association of Independent Schools and the New Jersey Association of Independent Schools.

== History ==
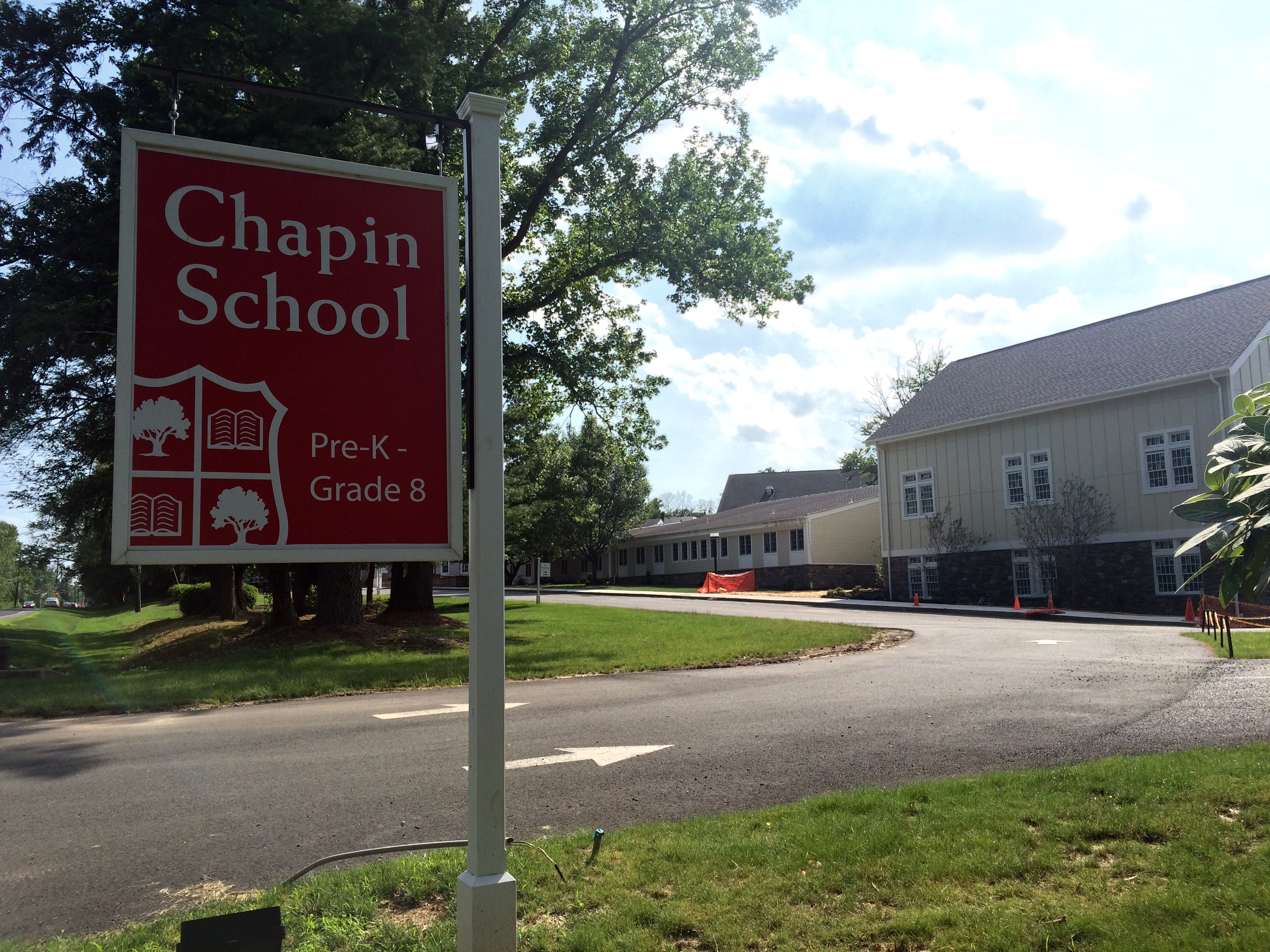

Chapin School was founded in Princeton in 1931 by Frances Jordan Chapin. The school acquired its first permanent location in April 1951. In 1958, the school moved to its current site, having purchased the 5-acre (20,000 m^{2}) Edgar S. Smith estate, which included the pre-American Revolutionary War Henry D. Phillips House.

The first decade of the "new" Chapin, incorporated in April 1951, saw a growing student body, administrative stability and the acquisition of a permanent site for the school. Following Mrs. Chapin's death, classes were held for three years in a rented house at 11 Mercer Street. In 1954, the school moved to "Snowden," which it leased from Bernard Kilgore, publisher of The Wall Street Journal and The Princeton Packet. In 1958, Chapin moved to its present location in northern Lawrence Township, having purchased the five-acre Edgar S. Smith estate, the centerpiece of which was the pre-Revolutionary War Henry D. Phillips House.

As the school "grew up," curriculum and institutional procedures matured. In 1991 Chapin received accreditation from the Middle States Association of Colleges and Schools, and in 2002, the school achieved dual accreditation from Middle States and the New Jersey Association of Independent Schools.

== Facilities ==
- Over 50 classrooms
- 2 technology centers
- 1 design lab
- 3 science labs
- 1 music lab
- 2 libraries/media centers with 12,000 books and online resources
- Auditorium
- Full size gymnasium
- 3 athletic fields
- 1 business office with conference room
- 1 dining pavilion

== Recent history ==
Chapin School launched its most ambitious capital campaign in history in 2012. This consisted of a number of Lower School and Upper School renovations and new facilities including classrooms, science labs, library/media centers and the commons area. By 2015, the capital campaign topped $8 million.

Chapin School built a new pre-school and kindergarten building, the Margaret Wilby Primary Building, replacing the old Pre-K building during the 2006-2007 school year.

== Notable alumni ==
- Bebe Neuwirth - Star of Cheers and television, movies, and Broadway.
