= Association of Delaware Valley Independent Schools =

American voluntary, non-profit consortium

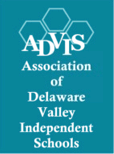

The Association of Delaware Valley Independent Schools (ADVIS) is a voluntary, non-profit consortium of independent schools in the Delaware Valley area of the United States. With headquarters in Bryn Mawr, Pennsylvania, the Association currently has 134 members located throughout eastern Pennsylvania, northern Delaware, and central and southern New Jersey.

== Member schools ==
- West Nottingham Academy, Colora, MD

=== Delaware ===
- Archmere Academy, Claymont, DE
- Centreville Layton School, Centreville, DE
- The College School, Newark, DE
- Hockessin Montessori School, Hockessin, DE
- The Independence School, Newark, DE
- St. Anne's Episcopal School, Middletown, DE
- St. Andrew's School, Middletown, DE
- Sanford School, Hockessin, DE

==== Wilmington ====
- The Pilot School
- The Tatnall School
- Tower Hill School
- Ursuline Academy
- Wilmington Friends School
- Wilmington Montessori School

=== New Jersey ===
- Cambridge School, Pennington, NJ
- Chapin School, Princeton, NJ
- Christina Seix Academy, Trenton, NJ
- Doane Academy, Burlington, NJ
- Friends School Mullica Hill, Mullica Hill, NJ
- The Laurel School of Princeton, Princeton, NJ
- The Lawrenceville School, Lawrenceville, NJ
- Moorestown Friends School, Moorestown, NJ
- Orchard Friends School, Riverton, NJ
- The Pennington School, Pennington, NJ
- Princeton Day School, Princeton, NJ
- Princeton Friends School, Princeton, NJ
- Westfield Friends School, Cinnaminson, NJ

=== Pennsylvania ===
- Abington Friends School, Abington, PA
- Academy of Notre Dame de Namur, Villanova, PA
- Academy of the New Church, Bryn Athyn, PA
- The Agnes Irwin School, Rosemont, PA
- AIM Academy, Conshohocken, PA
- Ancillae Assumpta Academy, Wyncote, PA
- The Baldwin School, Bryn Mawr, PA
- Benchmark School, Media, PA
- Bryn Athyn Church School, Bryn Athyn, PA
- Buckingham Friends School, Lahaska, PA
- Center School, Abington, PA
- Church Farm School, Exton, PA
- Delaware County Christian School, Newtown Square, PA
- Delaware Valley Friends School, Paoli, PA
- Dock Mennonite Academy, Lansdale/Souderton, PA
- The Episcopal Academy, Newtown Square, PA
- French International School of Philadelphia, Bala Cynwyd, PA
- Friends' Central School, Wynnewood, PA
- Friends School Haverford, Haverford, PA
- George School, Newtown, PA
- Germantown Academy, Fort Washington, PA
- Gladwyne Montessori School, Gladwyne, PA
- Goshen Friends School, West Chester, PA
- The Grayson School, Radnor, PA
- Gwynedd Friends School, North Wales, PA
- Gwynedd Mercy Academy High School, Gwynedd Valley, PA
- Gwynedd Mercy Academy Elementary School, Spring House, PA
- Harrisburg Academy, Wormleysburg, PA
- The Haverford School, Haverford, PA
- The Hill School, Pottstown, PA
- Hill Top Preparatory School, Rosemont, PA
- The Hillside School, Macungie, PA
- Holy Child Academy, Drexel Hill, PA
- Holy Child School at Rosemont, Rosemont, PA
- Holy Ghost Preparatory School, Bensalem, PA
- Jack M. Barrack Hebrew Academy, Bryn Mawr, PA
- The Janus School, Mount Joy, PA
- Kimberton Waldorf School, Phoenixville, PA
- Kohelet Yeshiva High School, Merion Station, PA
- La Salle College High School, Wyndmoor, PA
- Lancaster Country Day School, Lancaster, PA
- Lansdowne Friends School, Lansdowne, PA
- Malvern Preparatory School, Malvern, PA
- The Meadowbrook School, Meadowbrook, PA
- Media-Providence Friends School, Media, PA
- Merion Mercy Academy, Merion, PA
- MileStone Academy, Jenkintown, PA
- The Miquon School, Conshohocken, PA
- MMI Preparatory School, Freeland, PA
- The Montessori School, Dresher, PA
- The Montgomery School, Chester Springs, PA
- Moravian Academy, Bethlehem, PA
- Mount Saint Joseph Academy, Flourtown, PA
- New School Montessori, Lancaster, PA
- Newtown Friends School, Newtown, PA
- Perelman Jewish Day School, Elkins Park/Wynnewood, PA
- The Perkiomen School, Pennsburg, PA
- The Phelps School, Malvern, PA
- Plymouth Meeting Friends School, Plymouth Meeting, PA
- The Quaker School of Horsham, Horsham, PA
- Sacred Heart Academy Bryn Mawr, Bryn Mawr, PA
- The School in Rose Valley, Rose Valley, PA
- The Shipley School, Bryn Mawr, PA
- Solebury School, Solebury Township, PA
- Stratford Friends School, Newtown Square, PA
- TALK School, Newtown Square, PA
- United Friends School, Quakertown, PA
- Upland Country Day School, Kennett Square, PA
- Valley Forge Military Academy, Wayne, PA
- The Vanguard School, Malvern, PA
- Villa Maria Academy, Malvern, PA
- The Walden School, Media, PA
- Waldron Mercy Academy, Merion, PA
- West Chester Friends School, West Chester, PA
- The West Hill School, Bryn Mawr, PA
- Westtown School, West Chester, PA
- Woodlynde School, Strafford, PA
- The Wyndcroft School, Pottstown, PA
- York Country Day School, York, PA
- YSC Academy, Wayne, PA

==== Philadelphia ====
- CB Community Schools
- Community Partnership School
- Cornerstone Christian Academy
- The Crefeld School
- Cristo Rey Philadelphia High School
- Frankford Friends School
- Friends Select School
- Germantown Friends School
- Gesu School
- Girard College
- Greene Street Friends School
- Greene Town Montessori School
- Nazareth Academy
- Norwood-Fontbonne Academy
- The Pennsylvania School for the Deaf
- The Philadelphia School
- Revolution School
- St. James School
- St. Peter's School
- Springside Chestnut Hill Academy
- The Waldorf School of Philadelphia
- William Penn Charter School
