= Villa Walsh Academy =

Catholic high school in Morris County, New Jersey, US

Location
- 455 Western Avenue; Morristown, (Morris County), New Jersey 07960; United States
- 40°47′7″N 74°30′38″W

Information
- Type: Private, all-girls
- Religious affiliation: Catholic
- Founder: Religious Teachers Filippini
- NCES School ID: 01655307
- Principal: Elaine Bebyn
- Faculty: 30.1 FTEs
- Grades: 7–12
- Average class size: 40 - 60 girls in grades 9-12
- Student to teacher ratio: 6.4:1
- Colors: Green and white
- Athletics conference: Northwest Jersey Athletic Conference
- Sports: Tennis, soccer, cross-country, volleyball, basketball, winter track, swimming, lacrosse, softball, track & field
- Team name: Vikings
- Accreditation: Middle States Association of Colleges and Schools
- Publication: Innervisions (literary magazine)
- Newspaper: The Towerette
- Tuition: $27,900 (2026–27)
- Website: www.villawalsh.org

Villa Walsh Academy is a private Catholic college preparatory school for girls in seventh through twelfth grades located in Morristown, New Jersey, United States, conducted by the Religious Teachers Filippini. The school is located within the Diocese of Paterson, operating on an independent basis.

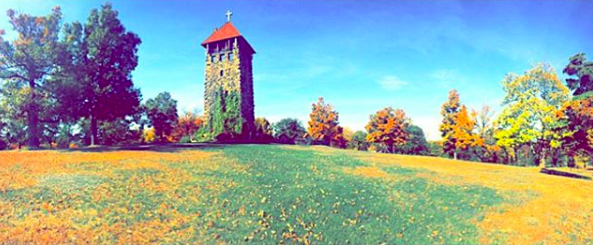
The tower at the entrance of Villa Walsh Academy, in fall

Villa Walsh Academy is overseen by the New Jersey Department of Education and has accredited by the Middle States Association of Colleges and Schools Commission on Elementary and Secondary Schools since 1987; the school's accreditation expires in May 2033. The school is a member of the New Jersey Association of Independent Schools. Villa Walsh Academy characterizes itself as one of the most selective in the state of New Jersey, with 50 students enrolled from 210 applicants.

As of the 2023–24 school year, the school had an enrollment of 194 students and 30.1 classroom teachers (on an FTE basis), for a student–teacher ratio of 6.4:1. The school's student body was 82.0% (159) White, 8.8% (17) Hispanic, 6.2% (12) Asian, 1.0% (2) Black, 1.0% (2) American Indian / Alaska Native and 1.0% (2) Native Hawaiian / Pacific Islander.

Villa Walsh shares a student transportation network with Delbarton School.

== Curriculum ==
Villa Walsh Academy coursework covers theology, mathematics, the sciences, including computer science, humanities, social sciences and the fine arts; presenting a rigorous challenge and solid preparation for a college-bound population. Also offered are Advanced Placement preparation, honors sections, independent study, and academic accommodation for gifted and musically talented students. However, special arrangements for gifted students not capable of being fulfilled within the existing offerings of the academy should be seriously discussed with the administration prior to enrollment.

The school offers Advanced Placement (AP) courses in AP English Language and Composition, AP Calculus, AP Biology, AP Chemistry, AP Physics, AP French Language, AP Italian Language and Culture, AP Spanish Language, AP United States History, AP European History and AP Computer Science.

== Awards and recognition ==
In 2010, graduates received almost $5 million in scholarships and grant money. Between 2006 and 2010, 11 students were National Merit Scholar Finalists and 62 were National Merit Scholar Commended Students.

In 2006, two students had a perfect 800 in the SAT on critical reading; one had a perfect 800 in math, two had a perfect 800 in writing.

== Athletics ==
The Villa Walsh Academy Vikings participates in the Northwest Jersey Athletic Conference, which is comprised of public and private high schools in Morris, Sussex and Warren counties and was established following a reorganization of sports leagues in Northern New Jersey by the New Jersey State Interscholastic Athletic Association (NJSIAA). Before the NJSIAA's 2010 realignment, the school had competed in the Northern Hills Conference an athletic conference comprised of public and private high schools located in Essex, Morris and Passaic counties. With 304 students in grades 10-12, the school was classified by the NJSIAA for the 2019–20 school year as Non-Public B for most athletic competition purposes, which included schools with an enrollment of 37 to 366 students in that grade range (equivalent to Group I for public schools).

Villa Walsh Academy won the ShopRite Cup Group B title in 2013–14, with first-place finishes in indoor relays and third-place finishes in cross-country, swimming (tied), indoor track and spring track and field, plus bonus points for having no disqualifications across all three athletic seasons. The school was recognized as the winner of the 2015-16 ShopRite Cup in Group B, behind first-place finishes in soccer, cross-country, winter track relays and spring track and field, second-place finishes in winter track, and swimming, plus bonus points for having no disqualifications in the fall, winter and spring seasons. The team won the Group B ShopRite Cup in 2016–17.

The swimming team won the Non-Public B state championship in 2006.

The tennis team won the Non-Public B state championship in 2008 and 2009, defeating Ranney School both years in the final match of the tournament. The 2009 team repeated as Non-Public B champion, defeating Ranney School 5-0 in the finals at Mercer County Park.

The cross-country team won the Non-Public B state title in 2009 and 2014–2017 and 2019.

The track team won the indoor relay championship from 2013 to 2016.

The soccer team won the Non-Public B state championship in 2014 and 2015, defeating Moorestown Friends School both years in the tournament final.

The spring track team was Non-Public Group B state champion in 2016.

== Notable alumni ==
- Tess Feury (born 1996), rugby union player who competed for the United States at the 2017 and 2021 Rugby World Cups
- Kathryn Tappen (born 1981), sportscaster who works on NBC Sports Group's coverage of hockey and football
