= Family Feud =

American television game show

- Genre: Game show
- Created by: Mark Goodson
- Directed by: Paul Alter; Marc Breslow; Andy Felsher; Lenn Goodside; Ken Fuchs; Karen Apple; Hugh Bartlett
- Presented by: Richard Dawson; Ray Combs; Louie Anderson; Richard Karn; John O'Hurley; Steve Harvey
- Announcer: Gene Wood; Burton Richardson; Joey Fatone; Rubin Ervin
- Theme music composer: Walt Levinsky; Ken Bichel; Robert Israel; Edd Kalehoff; John Lewis Parker
- Country of origin: United States
- Original language: English
- No. of seasons: 44 (Note: Total seasons (counting concurrent runs of the network and syndicated versions) as of the 2026–27 television season, consisting individually of 14 seasons for the network daytime version (nine on ABC, five on CBS) and 43 for the syndicated version (eight, 1976–85; seven, 1988–95; and 28, 1999–present).)
- No. of episodes: 2,311 (ABC Daytime; 1976–85; 10 unaired); 976 (Syndicated; 1977–85); 17 (ABC Primetime; 1978–84)

Production
- Executive producers: Howard Felsher; Chester Feldman; Michael Canter; Gaby Johnston; Kevin Williams; Jennifer Mullen; Myeshia Mizuno; Jim Roush; Sara Dansby; Brian Hawley
- Producers: Cathy Dawson; Gary Dawson
- Running time: 22–26 minutes (1976–85; 1988–94; 1999–present); 44-46 minutes (1992–93 Daytime; 1994–95)
- Production companies: Mark Goodson Productions (1976–85, 1988–95, 1999–2002) (Note: Credited as a Mark Goodson-Bill Todman Production from 1976–1982.); Pearson Television (1999–2002); Fremantle (2002–present) (Note: Credited as FremantleMedia North America from 2002–2018.); Debmar-Mercury (2007–present); The New Family Company (1976–85, 1988–94) (Note: Credited as The Family Company from 1976–1985.); Feudin' Productions (1999–2010); Wanderlust Productions (2010–present)

Original release
- Network: ABC
- Release: July 12, 1976 – June 14, 1985
- Network: Syndication
- Release: September 19, 1977 – May 17, 1985
- Network: CBS
- Release: July 4, 1988 – March 26, 1993
- Network: Syndication
- Release: September 19, 1988 – May 26, 1995
- Release: September 20, 1999 – present

Related
- Celebrity Family Feud

Family Feud (or simply Feud) is an American television game show created by Mark Goodson and currently hosted by Steve Harvey. Two families compete on each episode to name the most popular answers to survey questions in order to win cash and prizes.

The show has aired in three separate incarnations since 1976. Its original run from 1976 to 1985 aired on ABC and, starting in 1977, in syndication, with Richard Dawson as host. In 1988, it was revived on CBS and in syndication with Ray Combs hosting until 1994, with Dawson returning until the latter version ended in 1995. The third and current version, also in syndication, began in 1999 and has had four hosts: Louie Anderson (1999–2002), Richard Karn (2002–2006), John O'Hurley (2006–2010), and Steve Harvey (2010–present). The show has had four announcers: Gene Wood (1976–1995), Burton Richardson (1999–2010), Joey Fatone (2010–2015), and Rubin Ervin (2015–2026).

Within a year of its debut, the original version became the number one game show in daytime television; however, as viewing habits changed, the ratings declined. Harvey's takeover of hosting duties in 2010 increased Nielsen ratings significantly and eventually placed the program among the top three most-popular syndicated television shows in the United States. Harvey has also surpassed every previous host in tenure.

The program has produced multiple regional adaptations in over 50 international markets outside the United States. Reruns of episodes hosted by Steve Harvey air on Game Show Network, as well as in syndication while reruns of earlier versions air on BUZZR and Pluto TV. Aside from television shows, there have also been many home editions produced in board game, interactive film, and video game formats.

== Gameplay ==
The game features two competing families, each represented by five members (four during the 1994-95 season), who compete to determine the answers to survey questions. While there is no minimum age to participate in Family Feud, as long as at least one member of the family is 18 years of age or older, producers recommend that contestants are 15 years of age or older due to the nature of some questions.

Each round begins with a "face-off" question that serves as a toss-up between two opposing contestants. The host asks a survey question that was previously posed to a group of 100 people, such as "Name something you expect to see on the streets at Christmas time." A certain number of answers are concealed on the board, ranked by popularity of the survey's responses. The first contestant to buzz in gives an answer; if it is the most popular, their family immediately wins the face-off. Otherwise, the opponent is offered a chance to answer, and the face-off is won by the contestant giving the higher-scoring answer; if the answers are tied, whoever gave the first answer wins. If neither contestant's answer is on the board or they do not answer within three seconds, the other eight contestants have a chance to respond, one at a time from alternating sides, until an answer is revealed; if the first team gives an answer that is not the top answer, the second team gets a chance to steal. For every series except for the 1988-95 series, the winners of the face-off are given the choice to play the rest of the question or pass to the other family.

The family with control of the question then tries to win the round by guessing all of the remaining concealed answers, with each member giving one answer in sequence. Failing to give an answer on the board, or to give any answer at all, counts as a "strike". While they are doing this, the other family can confer with each other; if the team playing gets three strikes, the other family can steal the points that the first family accumulated by giving one of the remaining correct answers. The team captain is the only one who may give an answer; the only exception came during the 1988-95 series, where each team member was polled for an answer. The captain can select any suggestion or give his/her own answer. At the end of the round, any remaining concealed answers on the board that were not guessed are then revealed.

Answers are worth one point for each person in the 100-member survey who gave them, with a minimum of two separate members for any answer given, so the total points often do not add up to 100. The winning family in each round scores the total points for all revealed answers to that question; from 1992 until 1995, and again from 1999 until 2003, this included points from answers given during steals. As the game progresses, the point values are eventually doubled and tripled, while the amount of answers is reduced for each subsequent survey.

For most of the show's existence, the first team to reach or surpass a certain point total won the game. The most common goal has been 300 points but there have been exceptions. When the original series first premiered, the goal was 200 points and for its final year, it was increased to 400 points, although the goal reverted to 300 points for special weeks. From the debut of the original series until 1992, families were awarded $1 per point scored.

From 1999 to 2003, the family with the highest point total after four rounds of play won the game regardless of their score. The first three rounds were played as normal rounds. In the fourth round, the point values were tripled, but the families were only allowed one strike if they had control. In the rare instance that the family in control was trailing and could not accumulate enough points to potentially overtake the leaders before striking out, the game ended without the other family attempting to steal.

On the first two series a match continued until a family reached the goal. The current series reinstated the 300 point goal in 2003 but kept the four round format. If neither family has reached 300 points after four rounds, one more triple value question is played as a sudden death face-off. Only the top answer is displayed on the board, and the first contestant to buzz in with it wins the points and the game for their team.

In the original periodic primetime specials, three games were played, with the first two ending when a team reaches 200 points. For the third game, only one question round was played with the winning two celebrity teams from the previous rounds playing.

Beginning on March 2, 1983, each family had a small plastic tree placed at the end of their podium that had bundles of Tootsie Roll Pops on it. The anchor member of the family, who was standing next to the tree, would have a chance to draw one of the lollipops from the tree on his/her turn. If the stick of the Tootsie Roll Pop had a black mark on the bottom, the family won $100. The lollipop trees were used on the show until the cancellation of the series and made their final appearance on the last episode of the daytime series on June 14, 1985.

=== Fast Money ===
At the end of the main game, the winning family selects two members to play the show's bonus round, known as Fast Money. One contestant is onstage with the host, while the other is sequestered backstage with headphones so as not to hear or see the first portion of the round. The first contestant is asked five rapid-fire survey questions and has a set time limit in which to answer them (originally 15 seconds, extended to 20 in 1994). The timer starts after the host finishes reading the first question. The contestant may pass on a question and return to it if time remains.

After the first contestant has answered all five questions or run out of time, they are awarded a point for each person in the survey who gave the same response. Once these points are tallied, the board is cleared except for the total score, while the second contestant is then brought out to answer the same five questions. The same rules are followed, but the time limit is extended by five seconds (originally 20 seconds, extended to 25 in 1994); in addition, if the second contestant duplicates an answer given by the first, the host will say "Try again," and prompt the contestant for an alternate answer. If the two contestants manage to reach a combined total of 200 points or more, the family wins a cash prize; otherwise, the family is awarded $5 for each point ($995 being the most a family can win should they not reach 200 points).

The cash prize for winning Fast Money has varied. During the ABC and CBS incarnations of the show, the top prize was $5,000. In the original periodic primetime specials, each game was followed by a Fast Money round. The first two were each worth $5,000, and the final one was worth $10,000. The prize money was increased to $10,000 on the syndicated version until September 2001.

In September 2001, the prize money was doubled to $20,000 at the request of then-host Louie Anderson. This initially lasted until September 2009, when the Bullseye round returned at the start of the show, meaning the total for Fast Money was an adjustable amount between $15,000 and $30,000 depending on how much each family won during Bullseye. In July 2010, however, Bullseye was removed and the prize money reverted to $20,000, which has remained ever since.

For the 2026–27 season (the twenty-eighth season on syndication), the Fast Money jackpot increases to $50,000 for ten episodes only, to celebrate the show's 50th anniversary. Before the Fast Money round starts, the first participating member must choose one of the five envelopes, ranging from $20,000 to $50,000.

=== Returning champions ===
When Family Feud premiered on ABC, network rules dictated how much a family could win. Once any family reached $25,000, they were retired as champions. The accompanying syndicated series that premiered in 1977 featured two new families each episode because of a then common television syndication practice known as "bicycling" (wherein individual stations sent an episode of a series they had already aired to another station, reducing the number of tapes a syndicator had to send out but also ensuring that stations did not air the same episode of a show the same day, nor were they assured of airing in a proper sequence).

The CBS daytime and syndicated versions which began airing in 1988 also featured returning champions, who could appear for a maximum of five days. For a brief period in the 1994–95 season which aired in syndication, there were no returning champions. For these episodes, two new families competed in this first half of each episode. The second half featured former champion families who appeared on Family Feud between 1976 and 1985, with the winner of the first half of the show playing one of these families in the second half. When the champion rule was reinstated, the winner of the first half faced the champion family in the second. Occasionally two families from the 1976-1985 version would play the first half and celebrities would play for charity in the second half.

In some cases from 1992 to 1995, the returning champions continued until they were defeated. From 1999 to 2002, two new families appeared on each episode. In 2002, returning champions again appeared with the same five-day limit. In 2009, a new car was announced for a family who wins five games in a row. This was first changed to a $30,000 cash bonus in May 2024, and then changed again in September 2024 to a vacation and $10,000 cash bonus.

For the 2026–27 season, the show introduces "legacy families" which features fan-favorite families from past seasons returning to compete on the show, as part of Family Feud's 50th anniversary season.

=== Bullseye/Bankroll game ===
In June 1992, the CBS daytime edition of Feud expanded from 30 to 60 minutes and became known as the Family Feud Challenge. As part of the change, a new round was added at the start of each game called "Bullseye". This round determined the potential Fast Money stake for each team. Each team was given a starting value for their bank and attempted to come up with the top answer to a survey question to add to it. The Bullseye round was added to the syndicated edition in September 1992, which remained 30 minutes and was retitled as the New Family Feud.

The first two members of each family appeared at the face-off podium and were asked a question to which only the number-one answer was available. Giving the top answer added the value for that question to the family's bank. The process then repeated with the four remaining members from each family. On the first half of the daytime version, families were staked with $2,500. The first question was worth $500, with each succeeding question worth $500 more than the previous, with the final question worth $2,500. This allowed for a potential maximum bank of $10,000. For the second half of the daytime version, and also on the syndicated version, all values were doubled, making the maximum potential bank $20,000. The team that eventually won the game played for their bank in Fast Money.

In 1994, with Richard Dawson returning as host, the round's name was changed to the "Bankroll" round. Although the goal remained of giving only the number-one answer, the format was modified to three questions from five, with only one member of each family participating for all three questions. The initial stake for each family remained the same ($2,500 in the first half of the hour and $5,000 in the second). However, the value for each question was $500, $1,500 and $2,500 in the first half, with values doubling for the second half. This meant a potential maximum bank of $7,000 in the first half and $14,000 in the second.

The Bullseye round returned for the 2009–2010 season and was played similarly to the format used from 1992 to 1994 on the syndicated version. Five questions were asked, worth from $1,000 to $5,000. However, each family was given a $15,000 starting stake, which meant a potential maximum of a $30,000 bank. In 2021, John O'Hurley (then-host) said in an interview that he was unhappy with the return of the Bullseye round, believing that Family Feud was better off without it.

When Harvey took over as host, the Bullseye round was removed and the Fast Money jackpot reverted back to $20,000, which has remained since.

=== Celebrity Family Feud ===
The first edition of Celebrity Family Feud by NBC began in 2008 as part of a block of summer reality series it branded as All-American Summer. The NBC edition was hosted by Al Roker, with Burton Richardson as announcer. This version only lasted for one season and was canceled in March 2009. This is the first and (to date) only version of Family Feud to air exclusively on NBC. In 2015, the show was revived by ABC with Steve Harvey, host of the syndicated version of Family Feud, selected as host, and Burton Richardson returning as announcer. This would mark the first time any version of Family Feud has aired exclusively on ABC since the initial Dawson version was canceled in 1985. Harvey has hosted Celebrity Family Feud since 2015, while Richardson announced for Celebrity Family Feud from 2015 until 2023. Rubin Ervin replaced Richardson as announcer in July 2024.

In a 2026 interview, Harvey said that he originally wanted to bring Celebrity Family Feud back to NBC when the show was revived in 2015, as Harvey (at the time) was hosting his talk show, Steve Harvey, and Little Big Shots, both produced by NBC; Harvey said that he approached Paul Telegdy, an executive for NBC Entertainment, offering him the show, however, Telegdy turned down Harvey's offer, believing it would not be a good fit for the network. Harvey subsequently offered the show to ABC, which accepted it almost immediately. Harvey went on to say that Telegdy later approached Harvey to persuade him to move the show to NBC after the show proved to be a ratings success for ABC, though Harvey declined, preferring to keep the show on ABC instead. Celebrity Family Feud has remained on ABC ever since.

As of 2026, thirteen seasons of Celebrity Family Feud have aired (1 on NBC, 12 on ABC).

== Hosts and announcers ==
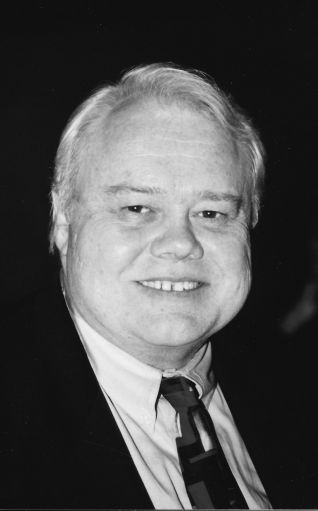
Louie Anderson was the host of the show's current syndicated edition from its premiere in 1999 until 2002.

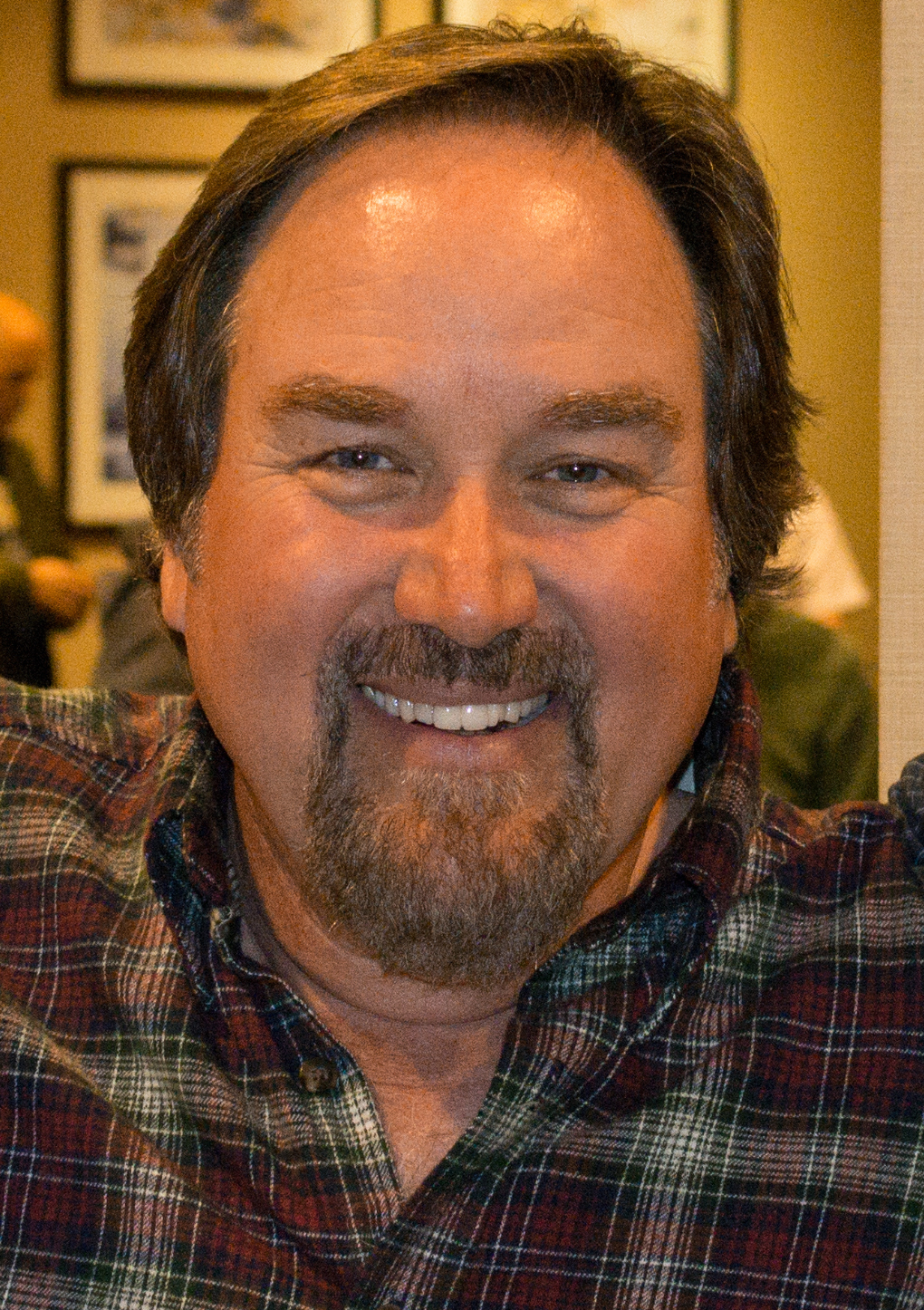
Richard Karn replaced Anderson as host in 2002 and continued to host the show until 2006.

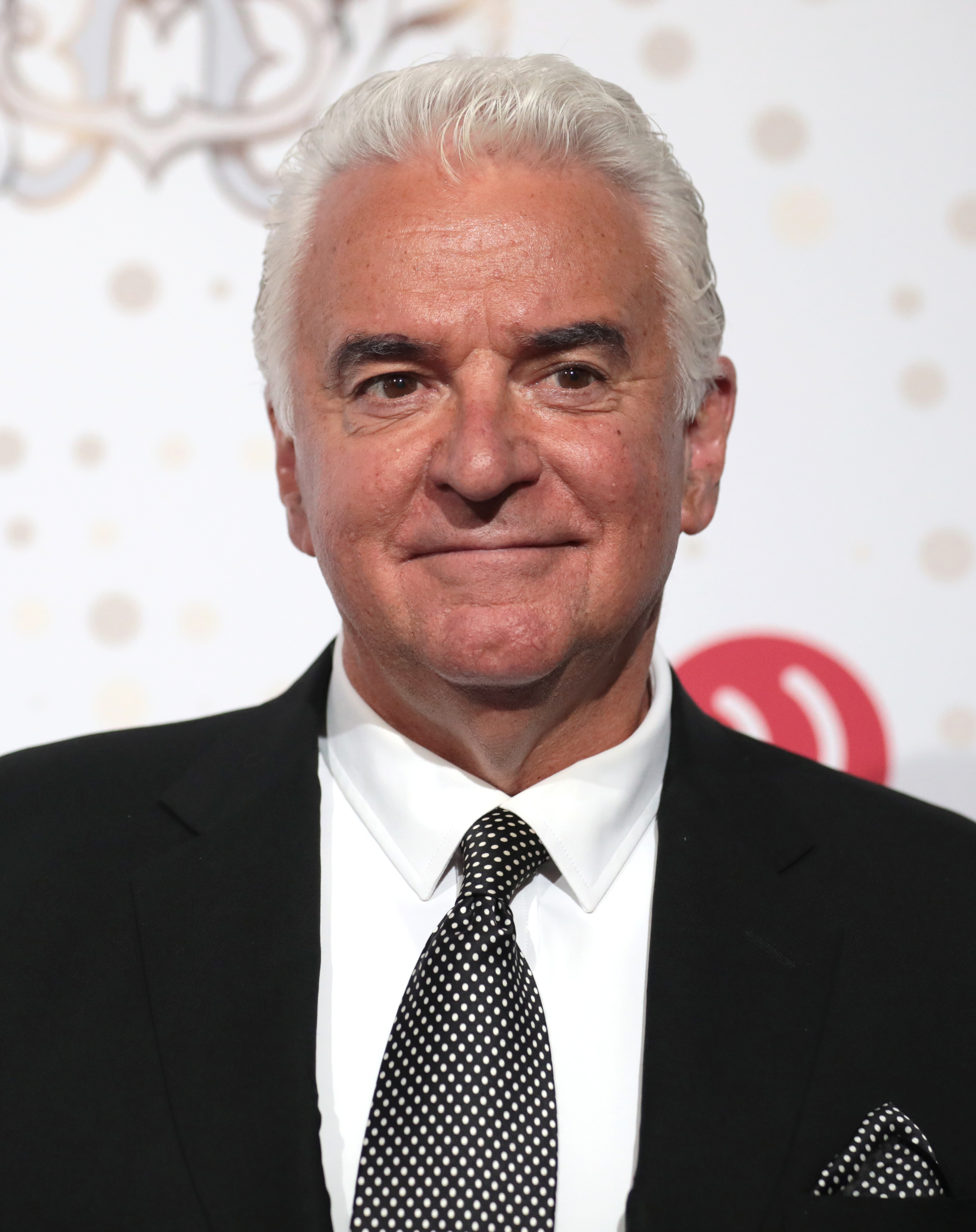
John O'Hurley replaced Karn as host in 2006 and hosted the show until 2010.

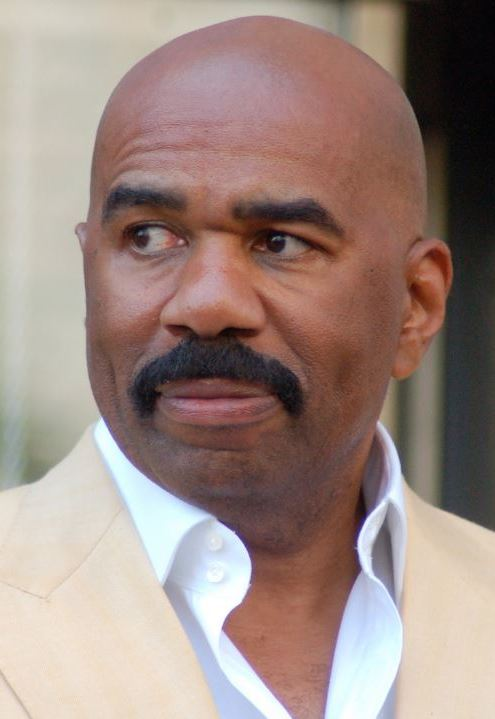
Steve Harvey replaced O'Hurley as host in 2010 and has hosted the show ever since.

When Family Feud was conceived in 1976, Richard Dawson (then a regular panelist on the Goodson–Todman game show Match Game) had a standing agreement with Mark Goodson that when the next Goodson–Todman game show was in the planning stages, Dawson would be given an audition to host it. Dawson had read in trade publications that a pilot for a new show named Family Feud was in the works, and it was originally to be hosted by Star Trek actor William Shatner (although since they were involved in the run-throughs, Geoff Edwards and Jack Narz, the latter of whom reputedly was Goodson's initial choice to host, were under consideration). Incensed, Dawson sent his agent to Goodson to threaten to present an un-funny, silent, and bland persona on future Match Game episodes if he was not given an audition for Feud.

Dawson was then selected as host of the original ABC and first syndicated versions of Family Feud. As writer David Marc put it, Dawson's on-air personality "fell somewhere between the brainless sincerity of Wink Martindale and the raunchy cynicism of Chuck Barris". Writers Tim Brooks, Jon Ellowitz, and Earle F. Marsh attributed Family Feud's popularity to Dawson's "glib familiarity" (he had previously played Newkirk on Hogan's Heroes) and "ready wit" (from his tenure as a panelist on Match Game). The show's original announcer was Gene Wood, with Johnny Gilbert and Rod Roddy serving as occasional substitutes.

In 1988, comedian Ray Combs took over Dawson's role as host on CBS and in syndication with Wood returning as announcer and Roddy and Art James serving in that role when Wood was not available. Combs hosted the program until the daytime version's cancellation in 1993 and the syndicated version until the end of the 1993–94 season. Dawson returned to the show at the request of Mark Goodson Productions for the 1994–95 season.

When Family Feud returned to syndication in 1999, it was initially hosted by comedian Louie Anderson, with Burton Richardson as the new announcer. In 2002, Richard Karn was selected to take over for Anderson, until he was replaced by John O'Hurley in 2006. In 2010, both O'Hurley and Richardson departed from the show. O'Hurley later said in 2017 that he left in part because he was resistant toward the show's decision to emphasize ribald humor and wanted to keep the show family-friendly.

In a 2021 interview, O'Hurley reiterated the shows' ribald humor as his reason for leaving the show, however, he went on to say that he always had the final say in regards to which questions aired on the show, though despite this, he was typically met with criticism from producers who disagreed with his decision-making, further convincing him to leave the show. In addition, O'Hurley also said that he left because the producers decided to move the show to Universal Studios in Florida, which interfered with Broadway commitments he had at the time and led to objection from his family; however, O'Hurley said that he is open to the possibility of returning to host the show, though such a move would only occur if the show reverted back to a family-friendly, wholesome format, something he believes is highly unlikely.

Steve Harvey was later named the new host and began hosting on July 10, 2010. Harvey has been hosting the show ever since. Announcements were made using a pre-recorded track of Joey Fatone's voice, which was used on the show until the end of the 2014–2015 season. Rubin Ervin, who has been a member of the production staff as the warmup man for the audience since Harvey took over, became the announcer at the start of the 2015–2016 season and retained that role until the end of the 2025–2026 season. Since the 2026–2027 season, the announcer role has been eliminated, with Harvey doing any necessary fee plugs himself. As of 2026, Harvey is the longest serving host in the history of Family Feud, having hosted the show for sixteen years.

The first four versions of the show were directed by Paul Alter and produced by Howard Felsher and Cathy Dawson. For the 1988 versions, Gary Dawson worked with the show as a third producer, and Alter was joined by two other directors, Marc Breslow and Andy Felsher. The 1999 version's main staff include executive producer Gabrielle Johnston, co-executive producers Kristin Bjorklund, Brian Hawley and Sara Dansby, and director Ken Fuchs; Johnston and Bjorklund previously worked as associate producers of the 1980s version. The show's classic theme tune was written by Walt Levinsky, Ken Bichel and Robert Israel for Score Productions, all of which are uncredited. The theme and cues for the 1994–1995 version was written by Edd Kalehoff and are based on Levinsky, Bichel and Israel's composition. The themes used from 1999 to 2008 were written by John Lewis Parker, with Israel's portion of the original theme being used as its basis. The production rights to the show were originally owned by the production company Goodson shared with his partner Bill Todman, but were sold to their current holder, Fremantle, when it acquired all of Goodson and Todman's format catalog in 2002.

== Broadcast history ==
=== 1976–1985 ===
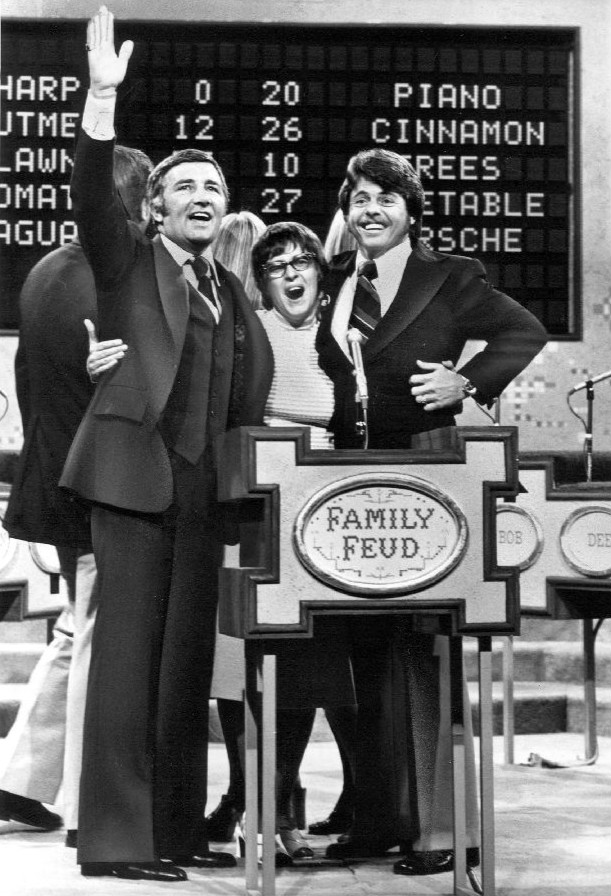
Richard Dawson (left) and contestants on the pilot episode of Family Feud

Mark Goodson created Family Feud during the increasing popularity of his earlier game show, Match Game, which had set daytime ratings records between 1973 and 1976, and on which Dawson appeared daily as one of its most popular panelists. The program went under two years of development before its launch, originating as a 1974 pitch called Odd Ball (which would have taken place in an isolation booth), then evolved into Fast Company (which would have featured a celebrity/civilian format) before settling on its final name and format when Mark Goodson thought to have two families compete against each other in the game. Match Game aired on CBS, and by 1976, CBS vice-president Fred Silverman, who had originally commissioned Match Game, had moved to a new position as president of ABC. The show, along with a revised daytime schedule for the summer, was first announced by ABC at an annual meeting in May. The show premiered on ABC's daytime lineup at 1:30 p.m. (ET)/12:30 p.m. (CT/MT/PT) on July 12, 1976, replacing Rhyme and Reason, which moved to 1:30 pm in December 1975 after the slot that previously belonged to Let's Make a Deal for eleven years (seven on ABC). Because it faced the first halves of two soap operas, CBS' As the World Turns and NBC's Days of Our Lives, Feud was not an immediate hit. Soon, the show surpassed its lead-out The $20,000 Pyramid to became ABC's highest-rated game show. But a timeslot change several months later made it a ratings winner for ABC, and it eventually surpassed Match Game to become the highest-rated game show on daytime television.

Due to the expansion of All My Children to one hour in April 1977, the show was moved to 11:30/10:30 a.m., as the second part of an hour that had daytime reruns of Happy Days (later Laverne & Shirley) as its lead-in. When the Dick Clark-hosted $20,000 Pyramid was canceled in June 1980, Feud moved a half-hour back to 12 noon/11:00 a.m. It remained the most popular daytime game show until Merv Griffin's game show Wheel of Fortune on NBC, propelled by a new, concurrent syndicated evening version, surpassed it in 1984. From May 8, 1978 until May 25, 1984, ABC periodically broadcast hour-long primetime "All-Star Specials", in which celebrity casts from various primetime TV series (mostly ABC ones) competed instead of ordinary families.

The popularity of the program inspired Goodson to consider producing a nighttime edition, which launched in syndication on September 19, 1977 with Viacom Enterprises as distributor. Like many other game shows at the time, the nighttime Feud aired once a week; it expanded to twice a week in January 1979, and finally to five nights a week (Monday through Friday) in the fall of 1980, representing the first time that a weekday network game ran concurrently with a nightly syndicated edition. Dawson and Feud coasted for several years at the top, seen twice a day in much of the country.

However, the viewing habits of both daytime and syndicated audiences began changing around 1984. When Griffin launched Wheel's syndicated version, starring Pat Sajak and Vanna White, in 1983, that show climbed the ratings to the point where it unseated Feud as the highest-rated syndicated show, even replacing it on some stations; the syndicated premiere of Wheel's sister show Jeopardy! with Alex Trebek as host also siphoned ratings from Feud with its early (and surprising, given an unstable first few months) success. With declining ratings (probably due mainly to its overexposure and viewers subsequently tiring of the show), and as part of a scheduling reshuffle with two of ABC's half-hour soaps, Loving and Ryan's Hope, the show moved back to the 11:30/10:30 timeslot in October 1984, as the second part of a one-hour game show block with Trivia Trap (later All-Star Blitz) as its lead-in, hoping to make a dent in the ratings of Goodson's The Price Is Right on CBS. Dawson also was growing increasingly exhausted with his workload. Having worked the equivalent of "eleven years" as host of Feud, as he told the Archive of American Television in 2010, Dawson did not want to continue in his role much longer.

At the halfway point of the 1984-85 television season, it was not clear if either edition of the series would continue beyond the end of the broadcast year. ABC would eventually decide not to renew its contract to continue the daytime Feud beyond June 1985. Viacom, meanwhile, was considering renewing the syndicated series and contacted Dawson to see what he wanted to do. Dawson told the syndicator that he would be willing to do one final season of thirty-nine weeks of episodes and then "be done with it" when the season concluded in 1986. Dawson then waited to hear back from Viacom, expecting a contract offer once they reconnected.

However, a decision by a core group of stations forced a change in course. When the syndicated Feud began in 1977, NBC was one of the first station ownership groups to buy the game show. Since then, its owned and operated stations all aired Feud in their Prime Time Access timeslots. With the recent downturn in ratings, though, NBC decided that it would drop the syndicated series from its stations at the end of the season if it was renewed. Instead of trying to find new affiliates in those markets, feeling that the ratings decline would only worsen, Viacom decided to cut their losses and shortly thereafter informed Dawson that they were not renewing Feud for another year; Viacom made this official at the 1985 NATPE convention in January.

The ABC series came to an end on June 14, 1985. The final week was taped a month prior, on May 16. Newspapers via Associated Press reported that this version was originally expected to end on June 28, 1985, however, ABC instead decided to end the show two weeks prior; it is unknown why this occurred. The syndicated version aired its last new episode on May 17, 1985, with reruns of the final season continuing until September of that year. Although first-run episodes were no longer airing, Viacom offered a "best of" package of reruns to stations for the 1985-86 season; the package was withdrawn from syndication at the end of the season.

=== 1988–1995 ===
After a three-year hiatus, Family Feud returned to network daytime and syndication in 1988. The daytime series was developed for CBS as a replacement for The $25,000 Pyramid, which had been on the network since September 1982 and had in fact already been replaced once that year; after the initial replacement game show, Blackout, was cancelled after thirteen weeks in April of 1988, CBS brought The $25,000 Pyramid back as a placeholder until Feud was ready. On July 4, 1988, the new Feud debuted on CBS with Ray Combs as host. The accompanying syndicated series launched on September 19, 1988, and initially both series were popular in the ratings.

However, the landscape in both daytime and first-run syndication was changing significantly during this time. Networks were starting to move away from offering game shows as part of their daytime lineups by the time the Feud revival launched in 1988; by the fall of 1991, only the daytime Feud and The Price Is Right, both airing on CBS, were left standing. Feud, like some others before it, was also prone to being preempted by CBS stations who wanted to air more profitable and successful syndicated offerings in the morning.

With the ratings for the daytime series at a low point in 1992, the producers of Feud instituted the aforementioned format changes, expanded it to an hour and renamed it Family Feud Challenge, which saw two families compete in the first half of the hour to face the returning champion family in the second half. The changes did not do enough for CBS, which publicly announced in November 1992 that it would return the 10:00 a.m. ET hour that Feud was occupying to its affiliates the following fall. The last episode of the daytime series aired on March 26, 1993, with reruns continuing to air until September 10.

The decision to cancel the CBS daytime edition of Feud did not have an effect on production of the syndicated edition, but it too was having its share of ratings trouble. While initially receiving desirable time slots such as the Prime Access slots it had previously enjoyed in some markets, it began to lose ground as stations looked elsewhere for programming; for example, tabloid newsmagazines like A Current Affair, Inside Edition, Hard Copy and American Journal tended to draw better ratings, especially among younger demographics. The syndicated series found itself disappearing from some markets, while others saw the show relocated to much less desirable time slots such as overnight or early morning.

With ratings at all-time lows entering season six, which premiered in the fall of 1993, distributor All American Television told Mark Goodson Productions that if changes were not made to Feud, they would cease distributing the series at the end of the season in 1994. New company president Jonathan Goodson, who had taken over for his father Mark after his death from pancreatic cancer in 1992, began discussions with his producers to find a solution; switching hosts was one of the ideas, and bringing back Richard Dawson was frequently bandied about.

Since the original series left the air in 1985, Dawson had largely remained out of the spotlight, save for his feature role as Damon Killian in the Arnold Schwarzenegger-led The Running Man in 1987. He had also started a relationship with a former Feud contestant, whom he married and had a daughter with. When he was contacted by Goodson, Dawson did express some interest in perhaps taking his former position back, and the sides began to talk.

This was a complete reversal of the position that Mark Goodson, who prior to his death had stood by Combs despite the struggles, had taken on Dawson when the series was in development in 1988. Remembering the acrimonious relationship that had developed between Dawson and the producers, including Goodson himself, Goodson had outright refused to consider the original Feud host for the revival. Many of the same staffers, including Felsher, were working on the current series as well and had not forgotten the trouble Dawson had caused.

But with the program in danger of cancellation, and the desire to make any change necessary to stave it off, Combs was deemed expendable and thus the decision to bring back his predecessor was finalized as production for the sixth season was concluding in the spring of 1994. Combs' last taping session saw him abruptly leave the stage at its conclusion and leave the studio without acknowledging anyone on his way out; two years later, he would commit suicide by hanging himself in a California hospital.

With Dawson now on board, All American Television chose to renew Feud for at least one more year, and the seventh season debuted on September 12, 1994. A newer, more modern-looking set was built, some adjustments were made to the gameplay, and the show was expanded to an hour with the return of the Family Feud Challenge format; All American allowed affiliates to choose between airing the entire sixty minute program or the second half of the hour as a standalone. Dawson's return garnered some interest early on, but the ratings slipped once again and Feud was finally cancelled at the end of the seventh season. The last first-run episode aired on May 26, 1995, with reruns continuing until September 8.

=== 1999–present ===
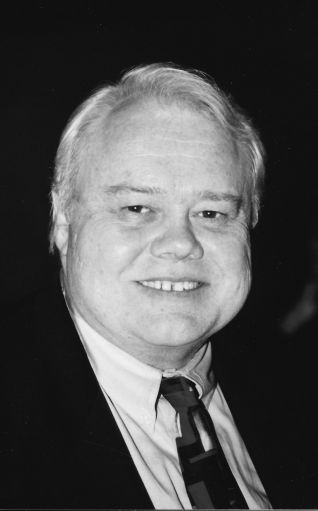
Louie Anderson in 2001

Family Feud returned in syndication on September 20, 1999, with comedian Louie Anderson as the next host. Three years later, Richard Karn took over the series, at which point the format was changed to reintroduce returning champions, allowing them to appear for up to five days. At the time, Anderson-hosted episodes continued in reruns that aired on PAX TV/Ion Television following his departure.

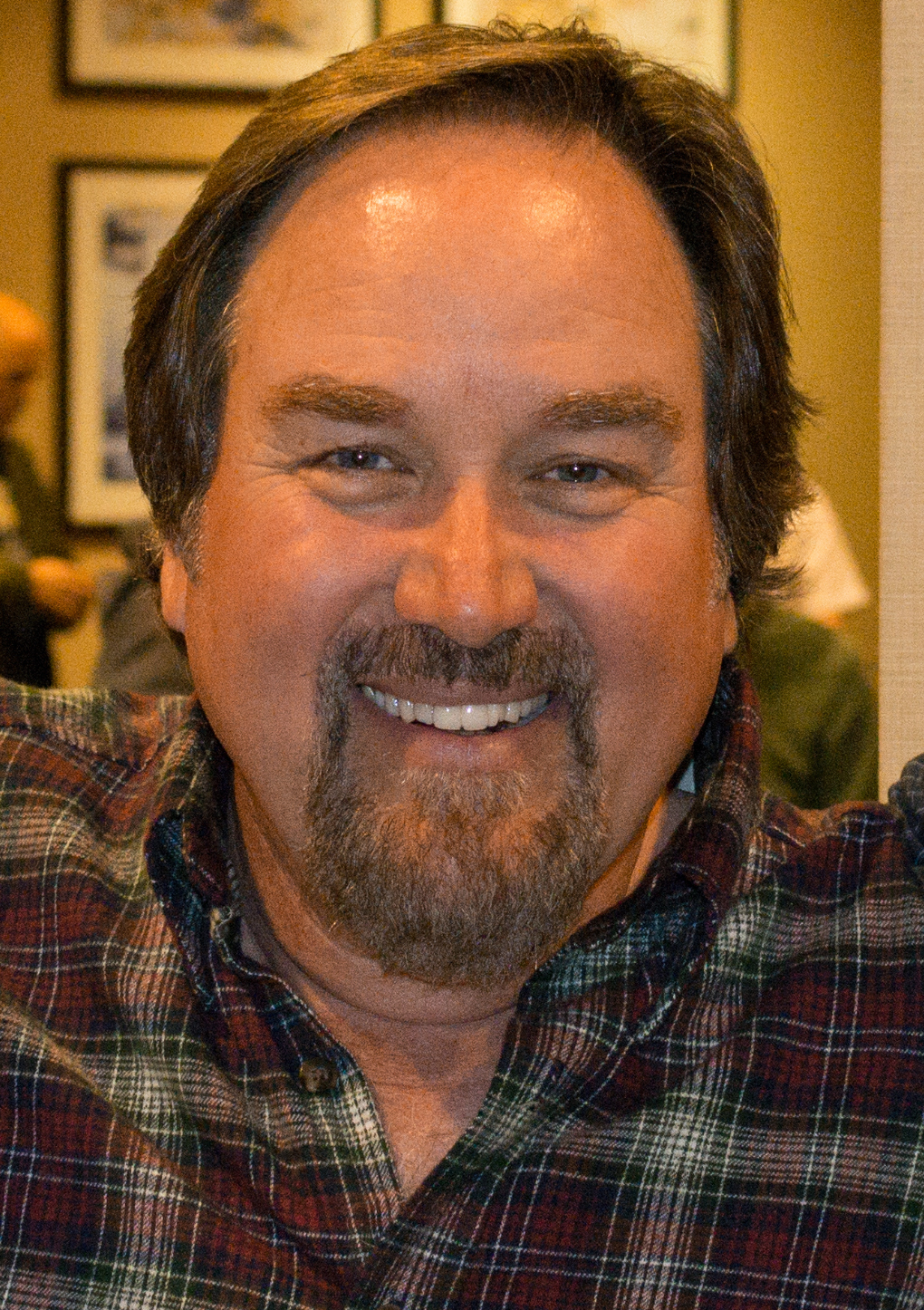
Richard Karn in 2015

In a 2024 interview, Karn said that the producers of Family Feud originally wanted Al Roker to replace Anderson following his departure. However, Roker turned down the opportunity as he did not want to leave New York City, leading the producers to choose Karn as host. Karn jokingly said that he was chosen as he was "the next Al on the list," referencing his character Al Borland from the 1990s ABC sitcom Home Improvement. Roker would ultimately host the first season of Celebrity Family Feud on NBC, which aired in summer 2008.

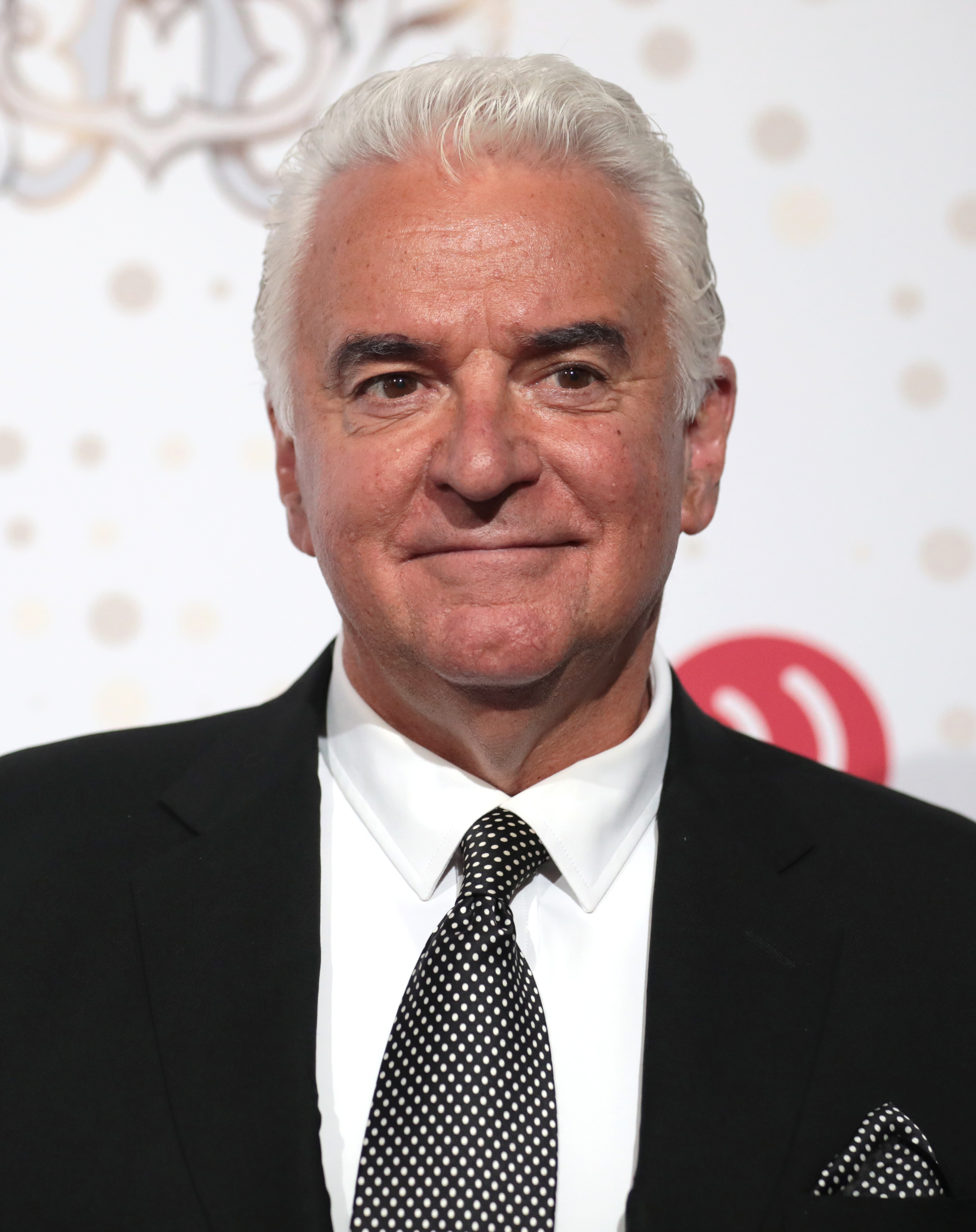
John O'Hurley in 2023

Karn hosted the show for four years until he was replaced by John O'Hurley in 2006. By 2010, the show's Nielsen ratings were at 1.5, putting it in danger of cancellation once again (as countless affiliates that carried the show from 1999 to 2010 aired it in daytime, graveyard or other low-rated time slots). That same year, O'Hurley left the show after four years and was replaced by Steve Harvey, who has hosted the show ever since.

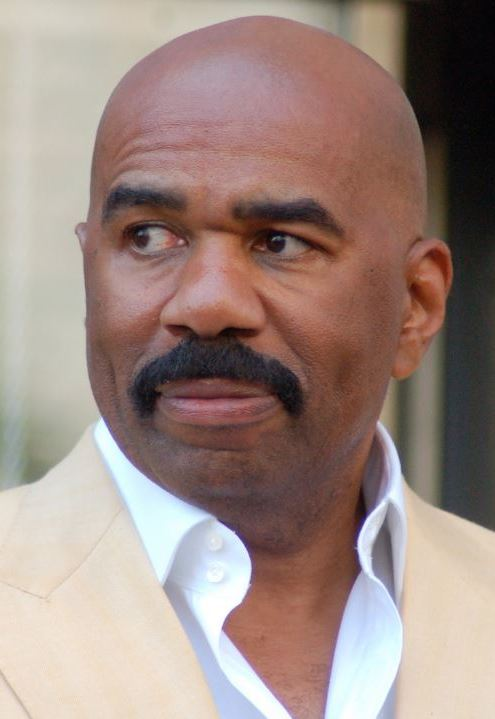
Current host Steve Harvey in 2013

Since Harvey took over the show, ratings increased by as much as 40%, and within two years, the show was rated at 4.0, and had become the fifth-most-popular syndicated program. Fox News' Paulette Cohn argued that Harvey's "relatability," or "understanding of what the people at home want to know," was what saved the show from cancellation; Harvey debated, "If someone said an answer that was so ridiculous, I knew that the people at home behind the camera had to be going, 'What did they just say?' ... They gave this answer that doesn't have a shot in hell of being up there. The fact that I recognize that, that's comedic genius to me. I think that's [what made] the difference."

Steve Harvey's Family Feud has regularly ranked among the top 10 highest-rated programs in all of daytime television programming and third among game shows (behind Wheel of Fortune and Jeopardy!); in February 2014, the show achieved a 6.0 share in the Nielsen ratings, with approximately 8.8 million viewers. In June 2015, Family Feud eclipsed Wheel of Fortune, which had been on top for over 30 years, as the most-watched syndicated game show on television, and consistently began ranking among the top three shows in all of syndication. The show has had improved syndication clearances and better timeslots. It has been airing in early fringe and prime access slots nationwide.

In a 2021 interview, John O'Hurley himself noted that Family Feud "fell into the right hands" with Harvey, who "came in and reignited" the show; O'Hurley went on to say that, with Harvey hosting Family Feud, the show “turned out to be a much bigger hit than when I was doing it. So I tip my hat to [Steve Harvey] and all that has happened with the success of the show since [leaving]”.

Production of Family Feud was shifted from Universal Orlando to Harvey's hometown of Atlanta in 2011, first staged at the Atlanta Civic Center from 2011 to 2015 and later at the Georgia World Congress Center from 2015 to 2017 and from 2020 to 2021. Harvey was also originating a syndicated radio show from Atlanta, and the state of Georgia provided tax credits for the production. In 2017, production moved to Los Angeles Center Studios (later moved again to Universal Studios Hollywood and later still to CBS Studio Center) in Los Angeles to accommodate Harvey's new syndicated talk show Steve, returning production of the regular series to Los Angeles for the first time since 2010.

In March 2020, after initially announcing that production would continue with no studio audience, Fremantle suspended production of all of its programs (including Family Feud) due to the onset of the COVID-19 pandemic. In August 2020, Family Feud returned to production, returning to the state of Georgia after several years in California and with health and safety protocols (including social distancing and no studio audience) being enforced.

From 2021 to 2024, the series was filmed at the Cathy Family-owned Trilith Studios in Fayetteville, Georgia. In early 2024, production of Family Feud moved back to Atlanta, and was moved to Tyler Perry Studios on the site of the historic Fort McPherson, with its celebrity edition also being moved there from California in 2025. In 2026, production moved back to Trilith Studios, with its celebrity edition also being moved there.

In February 2023, Family Feud was renewed for three more seasons, taking the show through May 2026. On July 12, 2026, Debmar-Mercury announced that Family Feud had been renewed for a 28th season, taking the show through May 2027. Premiering on September 28, 2026, this season (the show’s 44th overall, counting seasons when the earlier network and syndication versions aired concurrently) is being dubbed as the "50th Anniversary" season, honoring the 50 years since the original series debuted on ABC. In addition to featuring returning “legacy families” and the $50,000 Fast Money jackpot, episodes will feature a special throwback survey question selected from past episodes dating as far back as the first Dawson era.

=== Reruns ===
Game Show Network has aired reruns of all the versions of Family Feud since inception. Currently, it airs blocks of reruns from the Steve Harvey run of the program. Reruns of episodes hosted by Dawson, Combs, Anderson, and Karn have been included among Buzzr's acquisitions since its launch on June 1, 2015. Dawson's and Combs's episodes also air as part of Family Feud Classic, a free ad-supported streaming television channel offered through Pluto TV. In 2019, reruns of the Karn-hosted episodes started airing on Up TV during the morning hours.

== Reception ==
Family Feud won the Daytime Emmy Award for Outstanding Game/Audience Participation Show in 1977 and 2019, Outstanding Directing for a Game Show and the show has won the Daytime Emmy for Outstanding Game Show Host, once with Dawson in 1978 and three times with Harvey in 2014, 2017 and 2022. It was the first of the 1970s game formats that Goodson and Todman had brought to television that had received substantial critical success, as earlier efforts had been ridiculed for their lowbrow appeal despite their broad popularity. Feud ranked number 3 on Game Show Network (GSN)'s 2006 list of the 50 Greatest Game Shows of All Time, and also on TV Guide's 2013 list of the 60 greatest game shows ever.

Tara Ariano and Sarah D. Bunting, founders of the website Television Without Pity, wrote that they hated the 1999 syndicated version, saying "Give us classic Feud every time", citing both Dawson and Combs as hosts. Additionally, they called Anderson an "alleged sexual harasser and full-time sphere".

In more recent seasons, the show has become notorious for pushing the envelope with questions and responses that are sexual in nature, with content frequently referring to certain anatomy or acts of intercourse. This type of material has drawn criticism from viewers, including former NCIS actress Pauley Perrette, who in 2018 sent a series of tweets to Family Feud producers questioning why the show had to be "so filthy." Dan Gainor of the Media Research Center, a politically conservative content analysis organization, suggested that the responses are in line with sexual content becoming more commonplace on television.

The popularity of Family Feud in the United States has led it to become a worldwide franchise, with over 50 adaptations outside the United States. Countries that have aired their own versions of the show include Australia, Canada, Colombia, France, Germany, Indonesia, Japan, Malaysia, Mexico, the Netherlands, New Zealand, the Philippines, Poland, Portugal, Russia, Thailand, the United Kingdom (known as Family Fortunes), South Africa, and Vietnam, among others.

== Merchandise ==
Since the show's premiere in 1976, many home versions of Family Feud have been released in various formats. Milton Bradley, Pressman Games, and Endless Games have all released traditional board games based on the show, while Imagination Entertainment released the program in a DVD game format.

The game has been released in other formats by multiple companies; Coleco Adam released the first computer version of the show in 1983, and Sharedata followed in 1987 with versions for MS-DOS, Commodore 64, and Apple II computers. GameTek released versions for Nintendo Entertainment System, Super NES, Genesis, 3DO, and IBM PC compatibles (on CD-ROM) between 1990 and 1995. Hasbro Interactive released a version in 2000 for the PC and PlayStation. In 2006, versions were released for PlayStation 2, Game Boy Advance, and Microsoft Windows. Seattle-based Mobliss Inc. also released a mobile version of Family Feud that was available on Sprint, Verizon, and Cingular. Glu Mobile later released a newer mobile version of Family Feud for other carriers.

In conjunction with Ludia, Ubisoft has published Family Feud video games for multiple platforms. The first of these was entitled Family Feud: 2010 Edition and was released for the Wii, Nintendo DS, and PC in September 2009. Ubisoft then released Family Feud Decades the next year, which featured sets and survey questions from television versions of all four decades the show has been on air. A third game, entitled Family Feud: 2012 Edition was released for the Wii and Xbox 360 in 2011. A fourth game, produced by Ubisoft and developed by Snap Finger Click, was released for the PlayStation 4, Xbox One, Nintendo Switch, and Stadia in 2020.

In addition to the home games, a DVD set titled All-Star Family Feud starring Richard Dawson was released on January 8, 2008, by BCI Eclipse LLC Home Entertainment (under license from Fremantle USA) and featured a total of 43 segments taken from 21 special celebrity episodes from the original ABC/syndicated versions on its four discs, uncut and remastered from original 2" videotapes for optimal video presentation and sound quality. It was reissued as The Best of All-Star Family Feud on February 2, 2010.

== International versions ==
=== Family Feud Africa ===
Family Feud Africa, also hosted by Steve Harvey, began production after season 21 of the American version completed production in December 2019. It began airing on April 5, 2020. The countries included in this version are Ghana and South Africa. In conjunction, a website was launched dedicated to the region to catch up on previous episodes, submit entries and engage from a local perspective. Similar to the pre-1992 United States rules, families win money based on their main game score. Both families earn R50 per point with the higher scoring family playing Fast Money. The first and second rounds are single, the third and fourth rounds are double, and the fifth round is triple. For Fast Money, families play for R75,000, with a loss earning the family R150 per point.

Another spin-off show, titled Family Feud Botswana, hosted by Steve Harvey, began airing on February 9, 2025. The rules are identical to Family Feud Africa, where every point is worth P50, though the family that reaches 200 points in Fast Money would win P50,000.

== See also ==
- All Star Family Feud
- Family Fortunes
- Google Feud
- Pointless
- Dirty Rotten Cheater
