= Kent Place School =

Private school in Union County, New Jersey, US

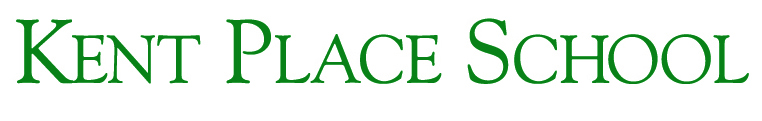

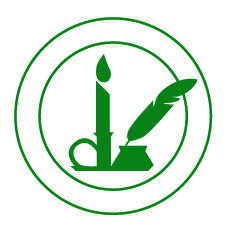

Location
- 42 Norwood Avenue; Summit, Union County, New Jersey 07901; United States; 40.720496°N 74.363743°W

Information
- Type: All-girls K-12, coed preschool, private school, independent day school
- Motto: With Wisdom She Lights the Way
- Established: 1894
- NCES School ID: 00869149
- Head of school: Jennifer Galambos
- Faculty: 93.8 FTEs
- Grades: Preschool (coed), K–12 (all-girls)
- Gender: Girls
- Enrollment: 636 (plus 32 in PreK, as of 2023–24)
- Student to teacher ratio: 6.8:1
- Campus size: 26 acres
- Colors: Green and Gold
- Athletics: 15 varsity sports
- Athletics conference: Union County Interscholastic Athletic Conference, NJSIAA, NJISAA
- Mascot: Chumley the Dragon
- Team name: Dragons
- Accreditation: Middle States Association of Colleges and Schools; New Jersey Association of Independent Schools
- Publication: Kent Place magazine
- Newspaper: Ballast
- Yearbook: Cargoes
- Affiliations: New Jersey Association of Independent Schools; National Coalition of Girls' Schools
- Website: www.kentplace.org

Kent Place School is an independent, college-preparatory, private all girls' day school in Summit, New Jersey, with a lower school (coed preschool and preK, all-girls K–5), middle school (grades 6–8), and upper school (grades 9–12). It was established in 1894 and has been ranked among the top all girls' schools in the United States. The school is accredited by the Middle States Association of Colleges and Schools and the New Jersey Association of Independent Schools.

== Student body ==
As of the 2023–24 school year, the school had an enrollment of 636 students (plus 32 in PreK) and 93.8 classroom teachers (on an FTE basis), for a student–teacher ratio of 6.8:1. Students of color represent over 50% of the student population. More than $4 million in financial aid is awarded annually, with 19% of students receiving financial aid.

== Faculty and administration ==
=== School leadership ===
In 2017, Jennifer C. Galambos became the 11th head of school at Kent Place School, succeeding Susan C. Bosland, who served as head of school for eighteen years. Kent Place School also has a Board of Trustees and a leadership team.

=== Faculty ===
In 2022, Kent Place School had 88 full-time faculty. Eighty percent of Kent Place faculty had 10 years or more of teaching experience, and 80 percent of the teaching faculty held advanced degrees. Fourteen had earned beyond a master's degree.

== History ==
Kent Place School was founded in 1894 when six businessmen from Summit, NJ, gathered to discuss the establishment of a school for girls that would offer an education comparable to that of their sons. The school opened its doors in the fall of 1894 on an estate once belonging to New York State Chancellor James Kent (1763–1847). In 1963 The school accepted its first Jewish Student under the auspices of Ms Bell head of the primary school and Ms. Wolfe Headmistress at the time. The school began accepting boarding students in 1896, ending its boarding program in 1968.

== Campus ==
Kent Place School is located in Union County on a 26-acre campus in northern New Jersey, twenty miles west of New York City. Kent Place School is accessible by a variety of public transportation options. It has been recognized by the Environmental Protection Agency as one of the top 30 Green Power Users among K-12 schools nationwide.

The campus consists of several buildings that house the Lower, Middle, and Upper schools, as well as other support buildings.

== Academics ==
Kent Place School has a rigorous academic curriculum with classes offered across disciplines at varied levels. Kent Place offers AP classes, in addition to other college-level classes. The school offers interdisciplinary courses such as the Bioethics Project, Engineering and the Arts, Medicinal Chemistry, and Student-Designed Research.

=== External Programs ===
Kent Place School offers external programs outside of its curriculum, open to students from any school: the Ethics Institute, Girls' Leadership Institute, and Summer Camp.

=== Coed preschool and pre-kindergarten ===
Kent Place School offers junior pre-kindergarten and pre-kindergarten programs for boys and girls ages 3–5. The pre-kindergarten curriculum introduces children to literacy and reading, math, languages, music, physical education, and movement.

==== Advanced Placement ====
Kent Place Seniors have a history of being awarded AP Scholar distinctions. In 2024, 66% of the graduating class were AP Scholars.

==== College placement ====
Kent Place School seniors have a 100% college enrollment rate. Of the Class of 2024:

- 21% admitted to Ivy League schools.
- Over 79% percent admit rate for early applications.
- Attended 49 colleges (37 private, 12 public) in 20 states, the District of Columbia, and Scotland.
- Seniors were admitted to an average of 8.1 colleges each.
- Nine students (out of the Class of 2024's 80 total) were in athletics at the Division I and III levels.

== Athletics ==
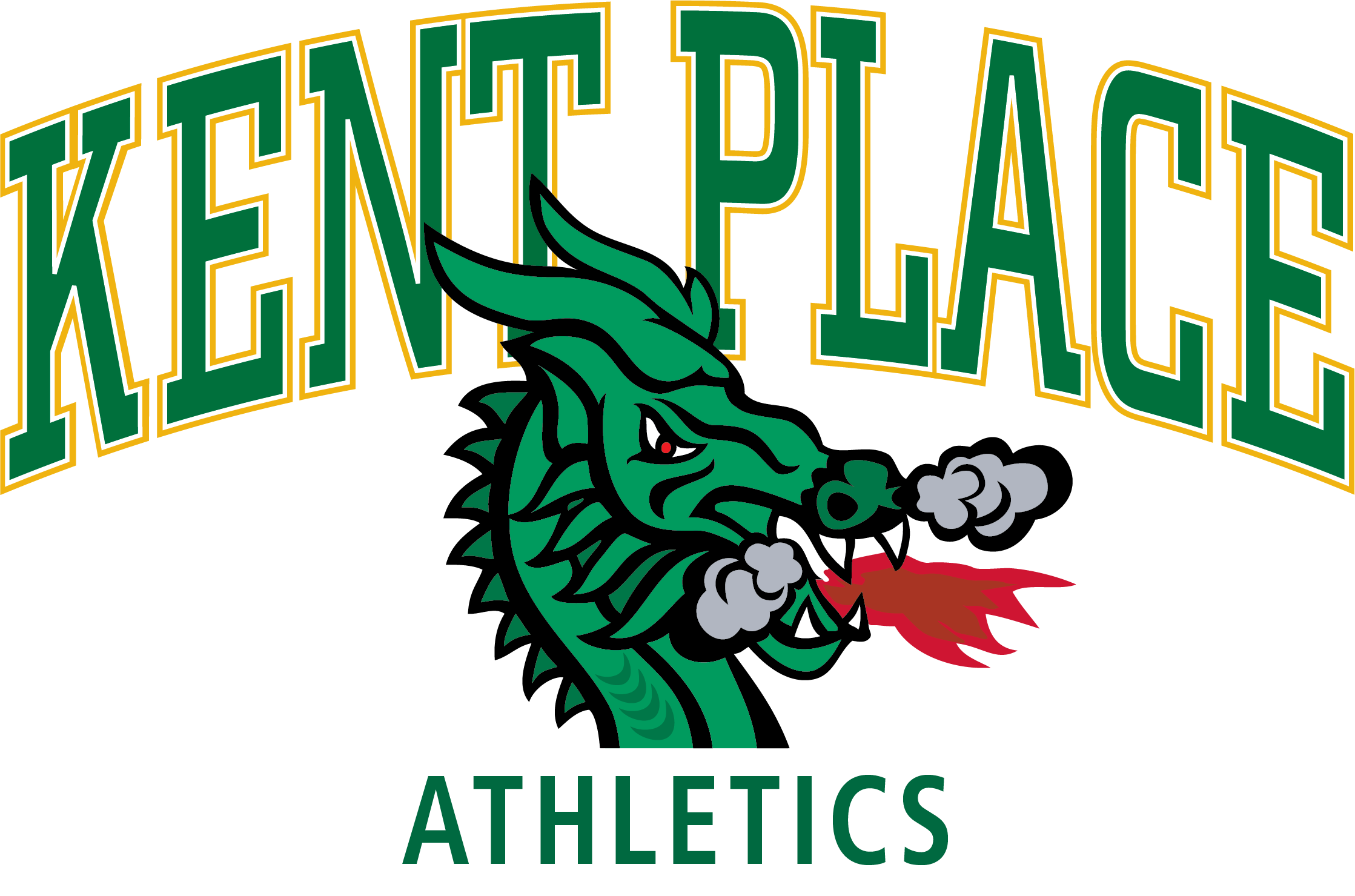
Kent Place School Dragons

The Kent Place School has 16 varsity sports, 10 interscholastic teams, and is a member of the New Jersey State Interscholastic Athletics Association (NJSIAA). 72% of Upper School students participate in athletics. The team's name is The Dragons, with Chumley the Dragon as the mascot.

The Upper School offers varsity-level teams in cross-country, soccer, tennis, field hockey, volleyball, basketball, swimming, squash, ice hockey, fencing, indoor track, lacrosse, softball, and outdoor track.

Upper School team awards include:

- The field hockey team won the North II Group I state sectional championship in 1999.
- The spring track team was the Non-Public Group B state champion in 2013.
- The cross-country team won the Non-Public Group B state championship in 2013.
- The track team won the Non-Public Group B indoor track championship in 2014.
- The girls' tennis team won the Non-Public A state championship in 2017 and 2019, defeating Pingry School in the tournament final both years. The 2017 team finished the season 21-1, including a 3-2 victory against Pingry for the Non-Public A title.

== Arts ==
Kent Place School curriculum includes visual arts, dance, theater, and music, choral, and instrumental instruction in all grades. The on-site Hyde and Watson theater seats 260, where Upper School students produce two fully-staged productions each year. There is also an on-campus dance studio and art gallery.

== External Programs ==
Kent Place School also offers three external programs independent from the school. Students do not need to be enrolled at Kent Place School to attend.

=== Girls Leadership Institute ===
The Girls' Leadership Institute (GLI) is a summer program for 4th - 10th grade girls, with a goal to help them develop confidence and self-esteem while exploring leadership potential. GLI was established in 1996 as a summer program to help girls in 7th and 8th grades learn skills to develop strong leadership. In 2017, GLI expanded its programming to include more grades and ages.

=== The Ethics Institute at Kent Place School ===
The Ethics Institute at Kent Place School was founded in May 2007 as a program offered to students and adults looking to explore the process and practice of ethical decision-making in primary and secondary school communities. It is led by founding director Karen Rezach. Focus topics include bioethics, entrepreneurship, design for social innovation, and AI. Professional development offerings, school consulting, and parent workshops are also offered.

The Ethics Institute also supports the Kent Place Upper and Lower School Ethics Bowl teams. In 2018, the Upper School Ethics team was named the National High School Ethics Bowl champion. The Ethics Institute also publishes a student-run journal, The Lodestar.

=== Kent Place Summer Camp ===
Kent Place Summer Camp is a coeducational, state-licensed, twelve-week day camp program for boys and girls ages 3 through 15 years old. It offers day, specialty, and travel camps.

== Awards and recognition ==
Kent Place School is a member of the National Association of Independent Schools, the International Coalition of Girls' Schools, and the New Jersey Association of Independent Schools. Kent Place School has been part of One Schoolhouse since 2010, a consortium of independent schools across the country that offers a selection of online classes.

In 2007, The Wall Street Journal listed Kent Place School as one of the world's top 50 schools for its success in preparing students to enter top American universities. In 2025, Kent Place School was ranked first by Niche as the Best All-Girls High Schools in New Jersey, 3rd Best Private K-12 Schools in New Jersey, 14th Best All-Girls High Schools in America, and 54th Best Private K-12 Schools in America. Kent Place School is recognized by the Environmental Protection Agency as one of the top 30 Green Power Users among K-12 schools nationwide.

Kent Place School has won various InspirED School Marketers Brilliance Awards for Kent Place magazine, website, and printed material of viewbook/prospectus and brochures.

Kent Place School high school students consistently receive recognition from the College Board for college-level achievement on Advanced Placement (AP) examinations.

== Notable alumnae ==
- Saleemah Abdul-Ghafur (born 1971), author and activist who works with Malaria No More
- Erika Amato (born 1969), actress, singer and founder of Velvet Chain
- Peggy Bacon (1895–1987), painter, illustrator and writer
- Emily Barton (born 1969), novelist
- Sarah D. Bunting (class of 1990), writer, founder of Television Without Pity
- Maria Dizzia (born 1974, class of 1993), actress, 2010 Tony nominee for Best Performance by an Actress in a Play
- Natalie Enright Jerger (class of 1998), computer scientist
- Gina Genovese (born 1959), businesswoman and politician who has served as mayor of Long Hill Township
- Alina Habba (born 1984, class of 2002), lawyer best known for representing the President of the United States, Donald Trump
- Chisa Hutchinson (born 1980), playwright
- Judy Joo (born 1974), professional chef, author, and television personality
- Maureen Ogden (1928–2022), politician who served seven terms in the New Jersey General Assembly, from 1982 to 1996
- Shirley Paget, Marchioness of Anglesey (1924–2017), British public servant and writer
- Gabrielle Stanton (born 1968), television writer and producer best known for her work on the series Grey's Anatomy and Ugly Betty
- Janet Sorg Stoltzfus, (1931–2004), educator, who established the Ta'iz Cooperative School, the first non-religious school in north Yemen
- Amanda Urban (born 1946/47), literary agent
- Emma Vigeland (class of 2012), political commentator
