= Tunnelmental =

English punktronica band

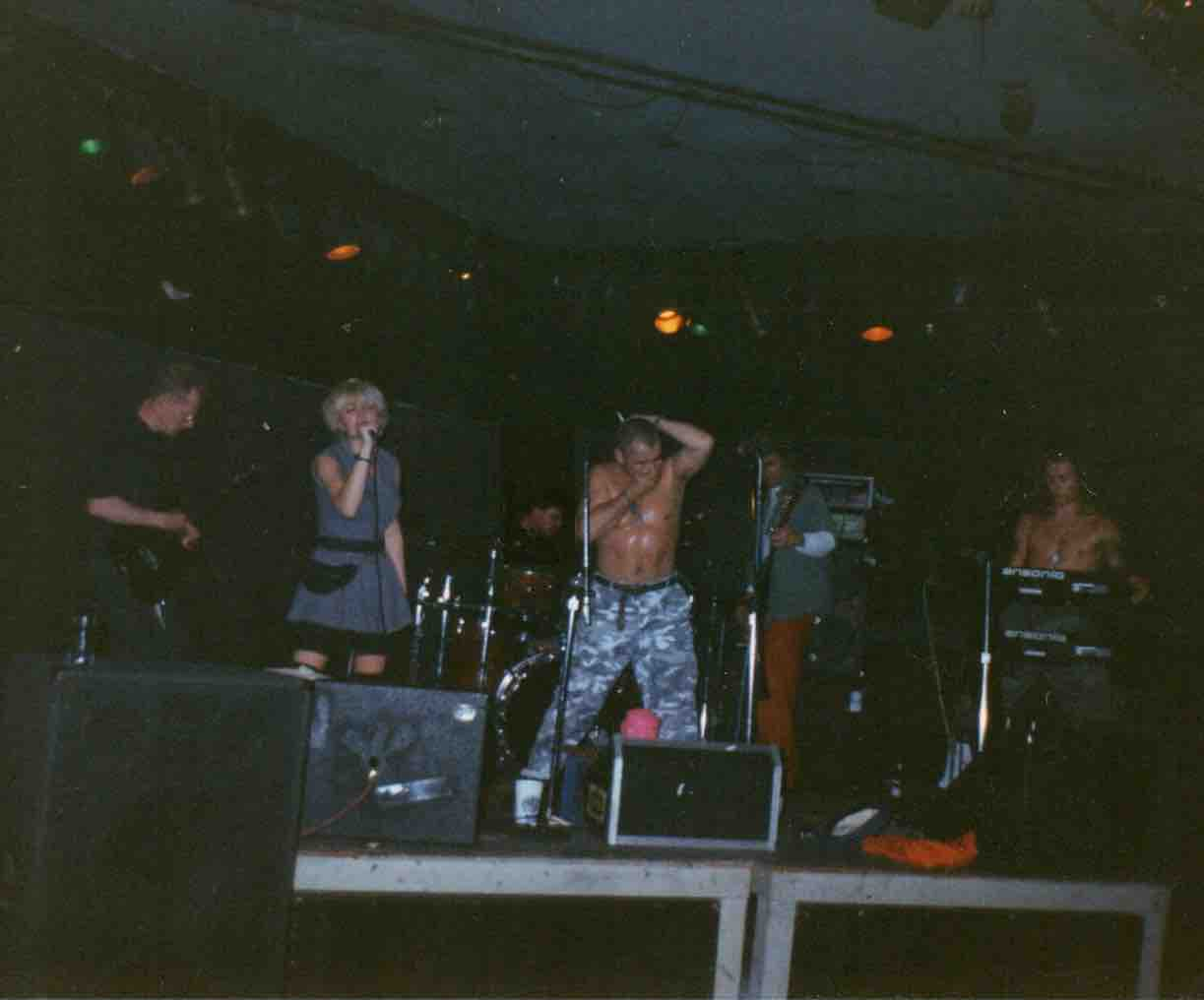
- Tunnelmental performing in L.A. in 1993. From left to right: Jez, Audrey, Craig (background), Biff, Jeff, Dék

Background information
- Origin: Swindon, U.K.
- Genres: Punktronica; alternative rock; post-punk; electronic rock; industrial rock; electronica
- Years active: 1988–1995; 2008–present
- Labels: Nate Starkman & Son; Fundamental Records; T.O.N. Records; Tunnelmental Music
- Members: Nigel R Mitchell ("Biff"); Derek Pippert ("Dék")
- Past members: Audrey Mitchell; Jeremy Smart ("Jez"); Rob Sharples; Jeffrey Calamusa ("Jeff Stacy"); Craig Van Sant; Tim Hayes; Kevin Bourque; Joe Reyes; Tom Calzini; Michael Petrie; Todd Szabo
- Website: www.tunnelmental.com

Tunnelmental, originally Tunnelmen and later alternatively known as Tunnelmental Experimental Assembly (T.E.A.), are an English punktronica music band originating from Swindon, U.K. and now based in Los Angeles, U.S. Formed in 1988 by lead vocalist "Biff" (Nigel R Mitchell), percussionist and backing vocalist "Audrey" (Audrey Mitchell), guitarist "Jez" (Jeremy Smart), and drummer Rob Sharples, the band's membership changed and expanded when the founders (except Rob) relocated to L.A. and were joined in 1992 by "Jeff Stacy" (Jeffery Calamusa) (bass), Craig Van Sant (drums) and "Dék" (Derek Pippert) (keyboards / MIDI samples).

Initially influenced by the likes of Killing Joke, The Prodigy, Siouxsie and the Banshees, Nine Inch Nails, The Beastie Boys and other industrial rock and electronica music emerging from the early 1990s underground rave scene and Wagner, Tunnelmental brought a new style of music harnessing the spirit of Punk ideologies, and blending with the sounds and pulse of electronic music.

Following a relaunch in 2010, permanent members of Tunnelmental have consisted of only Nigel and Derek as a core duo, with collaborations by various guest vocalists and musicians.

== History ==
=== Formative years (1989–1991) ===
Going by the name "Tunnelmen", the founding members were lead vocalist "Biff" (Nigel R Mitchell) and his wife, percussionist / backing vocalist Audrey, with two musicians from "Secret Troop" guitarist "Jez" (Jeremy Smart) and drummer Rob Sharples. The band initially played gigs in the Bristol area of the U.K. where they based themselves, and in London such as at The Sir George Robey on Seven Sisters Road. Following exploratory visits to the U.S. and productive music industry discussions, the Tunnelmen debut vinyl / CD album "Defeat the Inefficiency of Crashing", produced by Chris "Salty" Sellars, on the Nate Starkman & Son label was released in 1991.

Their music style evolved utilising audio-visual effects for live performances and enriching the music with the inclusion of techno, dance and punk elements, leading to the revised band name of "Tunnelmental". Rob left the band as the three other members (Nigel, Audrey and Jeremy) then relocated to L.A.

=== Expanded lineup (1992–1995) ===
On arrival in L.A. the founding members quickly came to know another recently formed 8-piece alternative-pop band called "Heat Your Shack", the core of which comprised bass player "Jeff Stacy" (Jeffrey Calamusa), drummer Craig Van Sant and "Dék" (Derek Pippert) on vocals who also provided music engineering, along with 2 guitarists, a midi-horn player and a female vocalist. The "Heat Your Shack" core group then joined "Tunnelmental" whilst retaining membership of their original band, indeed both acts would subsequently perform gigs supporting each other.

The expanded "Tunnelmental" line-up consisting of Biff and Audrey on vocals, Jez on guitar, Jeff on bass, Craig on drums and Dék on keyboards and providing MIDI samples produced the CD EP "The Demise of Regressive Existence" in 1992, released on Fundamental Records.

A vinyl single "Charlie Said" / "Kiss Man Kind", produced by Geordie Walker, was released on T.O.N. records in 1994. This featured Tim Hays on bass and Kevin Bourque on percussion (replacing Jeff and Craig) and included Joe Reyes on guitar. The band’s membership later additionally increased to include Tom Calzini on guitar and bass, and "DJ Hive" (Michael Petrie) as DJ.

During this time the band set up and ran a club called The Auditorium on Hollywood Boulevard, which hosted various live music acts. They also played gigs at venues around L.A., notably including the Whisky a Go Go on Sunset Strip on 10 May 1995.

=== Break-up and hiatus (1996–2007) ===
Following a period of inactivity, the band members started to go separate ways. Nigel focussed on music video production work, commencing with the Cracker song "Nothing to believe in" from the album The Golden Age. He and Audrey split up, and she retired from music performance. Jeremy returned to Europe and resumed his professional career as a Database Analyst; much later he and Rob were involved in a reunion of Secret Troop. "Heat Your Shack" also disbanded as Jeffrey formed a new band Velvet Chain with Erika Amato. Craig found other drumming work, joining Velvet Chain and notably playing on the track "Treason" from The Buffy EP used in an episode of Buffy the Vampire Slayer, and on the Chris Darrow albums "Slide On In" and "Wages Of Sin" with Robb Strandlund. Derek found employment as Foley Mixer/Editor with Klasky Csupo.

=== Relaunch (2008–present) ===
After a twelve-year hiatus Nigel returned to music creation, and the revisiting of previous work with Derek led to the production of the CD Albums "Drop Beats Not Bombs" in 2008 (not initially released) and "¿teatime?" in 2009, on Tunnelmental Music. Credited to "Tunnelmental Experimental Assembly" (T.E.A.), they contain new songs such as "Advertising Junky" and a new single release "Killing Time", with reworked versions of much of the previously released Album / EP / Single output, including the tracks "Trial", "Deadneck", "Blind Horse Stumbles", "Warzone", "Kiss Man Kind" and "Charlie Said".

This was followed by a U.K. tour in the summer of 2010 as a 3-piece with Nigel on vocals, Jeremy on Guitar and including Todd Szabo on drums. Derek didn’t travel to join them in person, but instead created backing tracks to supplement the live performances. They played at various venues including the Wychwood Festival in Cheltenham on Friday 4 June 2010, the Notting Hill Arts Club "Death Disco" in London on Wednesday 9 June 2010, and the "Kasbah" nightclub in Coventry, Monday 14 June 2010.

Since the 2010 'relaunch', permanent members of Tunnelmental have consisted of only Nigel and Derek as a songwriting, production and performance duo, with collaborations with various guest vocalists and musicians, including Joe Reyes, Tracy Lee Skull, Emily Moultrie, Nicole Whitney Wolf, Patricia Strong, Angie M Garcia and Chuck Askerneese. An associated venture was the creation by Nigel and Derek in 2010 of the recording studio "Orange Groove Studios", which has enabled them to produce and self-release all of their own digital content issued as Tunnelmental Music, whilst also create remixes for other artists. Although continuing to be based in L.A., they visited the U.K. every Summer between 2011 - 2015 to perform at various gigs and efestivals.

A new single "Defending the Dreamers" was released in January 2011 with additional remixes by "Radio Riddler" (Brian Leiser and Frank Benbini from Fun Lovin' Criminals) and "Dekvanhype" (Derek Pippert). This was followed by the album "Say Unity" released in October 2011.

The songs "Border Station" and "Trial (rotten mix)" were released as singles in January 2012 and July 2012 respectively. In the Summers of 2012 and 2013 they played U.K. festivals including the "Alchemy Festival" in Lincolnshire. In September 2013, the album "T.E.A. Dance Vol. 1." was released.

On 7 June 2014, a live performance at the Electrowerkz "Klub Wicked" with guest vocalist "Jason Doghouse" (Jason Mark Walsh) of "Sicknote" and "Freak Dancers" Funcutter and Candiflip Blackwood of "Anarchistwood" was filmed and released as "Moments of Bliss".

After a brief tour of U.K. clubs and a festival in May 2015, the single "shite" was released in June 2015 and entered the Billboard Dance Club Songs chart in July 2015. This was followed by the single "sting" in September 2015, and the issuing of a new version of the single "Advertising Junky (it’s a trap)" in December 2015.

The singles "Awake Me" and "Barely Holding On" were released in early 2017, followed by the release of the album "Waiting here for you" in May 2017.

In May 2018, the album, "Shooting from the Lip" was released. From Summer 2018 to Summer 2019, Tunnelmental released a single a month for 12 months, which included the non-album version of "Nectar is Red" and the song "We Can" featuring Nigel’s daughter Joy as guest vocalist.

The album entitled "A Few Are Souls" was released in February 2020.

== Associated acts ==
- Heat Your Shack
- Secret Troop
- Velvet Chain

== Members ==
Current members

- Nigel R Mitchell ("Biff") – vocals (1988–1995, 2008–present)
- Derek Pippert ("Dék") – keyboards and MIDI samples (1992–1995, 2008–present)

Former members

- Audrey Mitchell – vocals (1988–1995)
- Jeremy Smart ("Jez") – guitar (1988–1995, 2010)
- Rob Sharples – drums (1988–1991)
- Jeffrey Calamusa ("Jeff Stacy") – bass (1992–1994)
- Craig Van Sant – drums (1992–1994)
- Tim Hays – bass (1994)
- Kevin Bourque – percussion (1994)
- Joe Reyes – guitar (1994–1995, 2010)
- Tom Calzini – guitar / bass (1994–1995)
- Michael Petrie ("DJ Hive") – DJ (1994–1995)
- Todd Szabo – drums (2010)

Additional musicians

- Tracy Lee Skull – guitar (2010–2019)
- Emily Moultrie – vocals (2010–2019)
- Nicole Whitney Wolf – vocals (2010–2019)
- Patricia Strong ("Tricia") – vocals (2010–2019)
- Angie M Garcia – vocals (2010–2019)
- Chuck Askerneese – vocals (2010–2019)
- Jason Mark Walsh ("Jason Doghouse") – vocals (2014)
- Joy Mitchell – vocals (2019)

== Discography ==
Studio Albums / EPs

- Defeat the Inefficiency of Crashing (1991)
- The Demise of Regressive Existence (1992)
- Drop Beats Not Bombs (2008)
- ¿teatime? (2009)
- Say Unity (2011)
- T.E.A. Dance Vol. 1. (2013)
- Waiting here for you (2017)
- Shooting from the Lip (2018)
- A Few Are Souls (2020)
