= Sir George Robey =

Sir George Robey may refer to:

- Sir George Robey (1869–1954), English comedian, singer and actor
- The Sir George Robey, a pub named after him
