= Emily Barton =

American novelist, critic, and academic

- Born: September 1969 (age 57)
- Education: Kent Place School; Harvard College; Iowa Writers' Workshop (MFA)
- Occupations: Novelist; critic; academic
- Spouse: Thomas Israel Hopkins
- Children: 2

Emily Barton (born September 1969) is an American novelist, critic and academic. She is the author of three novels: The Testament of Yves Gundron (2000), Brookland (2006) and The Book of Esther (2016).

== Background and education ==
Barton was raised in New Jersey, where she attended Kent Place School. She attended Harvard College, from which she graduated summa cum laude and a member of the Phi Beta Kappa academic honor society. She also earned an MFA in fiction writing from the Iowa Writers' Workshop.

== Novels ==
Barton's first novel, The Testament of Yves Gundron, was published by Farrar, Straus & Giroux in January 2000. The book's titular character is an inventor in the primitive and isolated farming village of Mandragora. When Gundron invents the harness – a device which alters the nature of farming – the villagers' lives change irrevocably. As Yves begins to recount the story of these changes, Ruth Blum, a Harvard anthropologist, arrives to study the village. Although the novel at first appears to take place in the Middle Ages, Yves's brother tells tales of travels to "Indo-China," and the villagers sing songs that are demonstrably examples of the blues.

Some critics found Barton's technique of juxtaposing cultural milieus jarring. But many appreciated the novel's postmodern gamesmanship. In a rare blurb, the famously reticent writer Thomas Pynchon praised Yves Gundron as "[b]lessedly post-ironic, engaging and heartfelt—a story that moves with ease and certainty, deeply respecting the given world even as it shines with the integrity of dream," and John Freeman, writing for Time Out New York, called it "An engrossing folktale that, in our technology-crazed era, ought to be required reading." Yves Gundron was named a New York Times Notable Book of the Year for 2000. It has been translated into Dutch, French, Norwegian, and Greek.

Barton's second novel, Brookland, was published in 2006. Brookland takes as its basis Thomas Pope's "Rainbow Bridge", a bridge that was proposed for the East River nearly a hundred years before the construction of John Roebling's Brooklyn Bridge, but which was never actually built. In Brookland, the bridge is the brainchild not of Pope but of a character invented by Barton: Prudence ("Prue") Winship, the proprietor of a successful gin distillery she inherited from her father. The novel is the story of the costs, both financial and personal, that the planning, construction, and ultimate destruction of the bridge exact from Prue and her community. Upon its publication, Brookland received widespread praise; in a review in The New Yorker magazine, Joan Acocella wrote that Prue Winship "is not a 'good-models' feminist heroine, nor is she one of the bad-girl heroines of second-stage feminism. She is a thorny, struggling soul. Together with the book's profound treatment of the spiritual ills born of the Enlightenment, this wonderful character is Barton's main gift to us." Brookland was also named a New York Times Notable Book, and was named one of the twenty-five best works of fiction and poetry of the year by the Los Angeles Times.

Her third novel, The Book of Esther, is an alternate history tale in which the sixteen year-old heroine leads the resistance of a Jewish Empire against a German invasion in 1942, using magic and steampunk technology.

== Other writings ==
Barton's fiction has appeared in Conjunctions, Story magazine, and American Short Fiction, and she has published essays in such venues as Moistworks.com and the Boston Review. She frequently writes book reviews for The New York Times Book Review, the Los Angeles Times Book Review, and Bookforum.

== Personal life ==
Barton joined the Creative Writing faculty at Oberlin College in 2018. She previously taught at Yale University, New York University, Columbia University, Princeton University, Smith College, Bard College, and Eugene Lang College. She is married to the short-story writer Thomas Israel Hopkins; the couple has two sons.

In a 2008 essay at Nextbook.org (now Tablet Magazine), entitled Eli Miller's Seltzer Delivery Service, Barton writes at length of her Jewish upbringing, although in one 2007 article she described herself as "a Jewess who wouldn't leave the house without a stash of Tylenol, safety pins and mints."
