= International Coalition of Girls' Schools =

Education organization

International Coalition of Girls' Schools (ICGS)
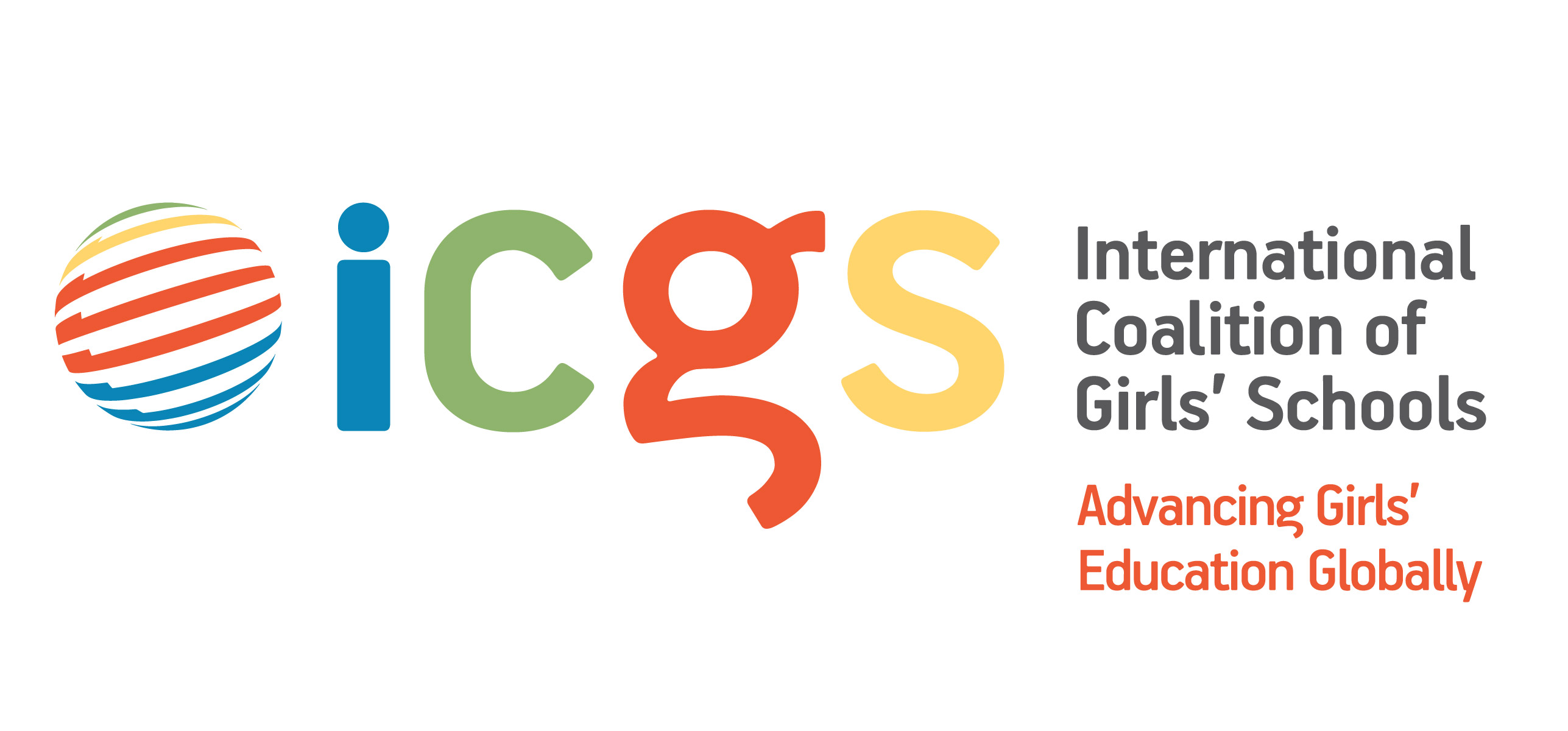
- Formation: 1991
- Type: Non-profit membership association
- Purpose: Serving Pre-K through 12th grade single-sex girls' schools
- Members: Independent, public, charter, and religiously-affiliated schools
- Website: Official website
- Formerly called: National Coalition of Girls' Schools

Founded in 1991, the International Coalition of Girls' Schools (ICGS) is a non-profit membership association serving Pre-K through 12th grade single-sex girls' schools across the globe. It includes independent, public, charter, and religiously-affiliated schools.

Until 2022, ICGS was known as the National Coalition of Girls' Schools. In 2022, NCGS agreed to merge with the Alliance of Girls' Schools Australasia. The combined entity, known as ICGS, includes over 500 schools in 18 countries with total enrollment of over 300,000 girls.

== History ==
In the late 1980s, Rachel Belash (Head of Miss Porter's School and President of the Coalition of Girls' Boarding Schools) and Arlene Gibson (Head of Kent Place School and President of the Coalition of Girls' Day Schools) recommended a merger of their organisations.

Fifty-six independent and religiously-affiliated schools boarding and day schools officially came together to form the National Coalition of Girls' Schools (the "Coalition").

In June 2022, the Coalition replaced "National" with "International" in its name, in order to be more inclusive.

== Member Schools ==
The International Coalition of Girls' Schools serves more than 500 national and international Pre-K through 12th-grade girls' schools (independent, public, charter, and religiously-affiliated). In 2022, ICGS merged with The U.K.-based Association of State Girls' Schools, the European Association of Single-Sex Education. A merger with the Alliance of Girls' Schools Australasia became official in January 2024.
