= Sarah D. Bunting =

American writer and journalist

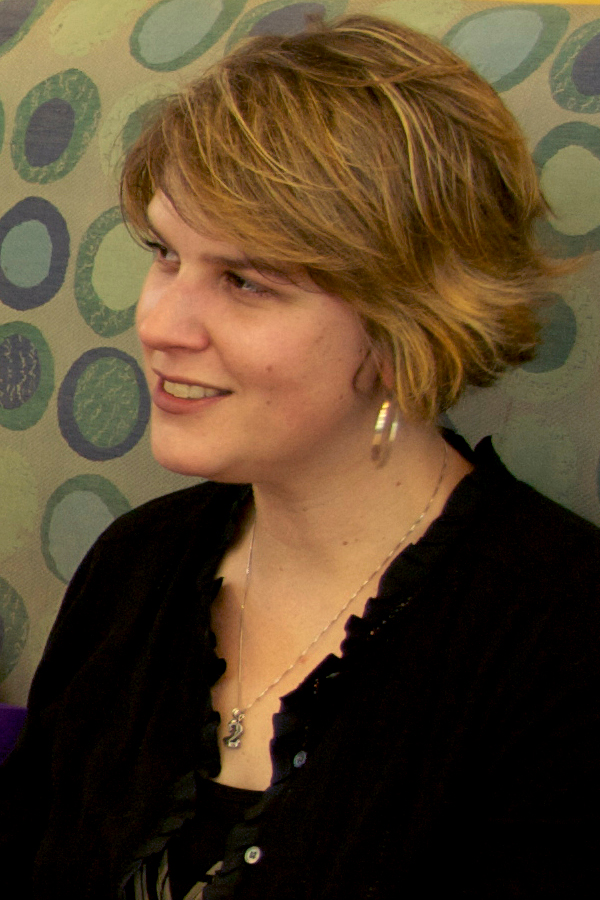
Bunting in 2009

Sarah D. Bunting, also known online as Sars, is known as an American writer and journalist, and a co-founder of Television Without Pity (TWoP). She has written for a number of magazines and journals, and has received coverage for her website Tomato Nation.

== Television Without Pity ==
Bunting and Tara Ariano met online on a Beverly Hills, 90210 fansite before in 1998 founding Dawson's Wrap, a website devoted to the TV soap Dawson's Creek. The site, dedicated to critical commentary on the show, expanded its coverage to more shows, was renamed Mighty Big TV and eventually relaunched as Television Without Pity (TWoP). The site became both popular with fans and influential among television executive producers and screenwriters, as evidenced in cases as when Rescue Me showrunner Peter Tolan used it to publish an open letter to fans defending the depiction of rape in a controversial episode.

In a 2004 interview Bunting expressed skepticism about the effect that TWoP had on the creation of TV shows. She acknowledged nonetheless that certain shows had made evident nods toward the site's effects, including the positioning of a TWoP branded messenger bag in a background shot, and a West Wing character's jibe at the moderator of a fictional internet message board "who I'm sure wears a muu-muu and chain smokes Parliaments." Bunting described the attentions of West Wing producer Aaron Sorkin, however ambivalent, as a net positive for the site: "If we're on his radar it's a good thing. And it drove up our page views."

With Ariano, Bunting published a TWoP spinoff book in 2006, called Television Without Pity: 752 Things We Love To Hate (and Hate To Love) About TV. The site was acquired by Bravo in 2007; Bunting and the other cofounders initially remained on the editorial staff before leaving in 2008.

== Tomato Nation ==
Bunting founded her website, TomatoNation.com, in 1997, and still blogs there. She has written that the website is named after a tattoo of a tomato she got on her right bicep because "[o]ne month every summer, New Jersey (where I grew up) has the biggest, best, sweetest, tartest, juiciest tomatoes in the world." The site drew attention for its advice column, The Vine, which journalists described as an edgier alternative to Dear Abby and Ann Landers for younger people. As a relatively early and prominent blog, it was also among the subjects of Viviane Serfaty's 2004 book The mirror and the veil: an overview of American online diaries and blogs, in which Serfaty analysed Tomato Nation's use of humor in constructing an identity as a blogger.

Bunting's account of her experiences during the 9/11 terror attacks on New York in 2001 (she was working a few blocks from the World Trade Center when the attacks began), first published at Tomato Nation, was syndicated on diarist.net and received print news attention.

=== Charity fundraising ===
In 2006, Bunting participated for the first time in a bloggers' challenge coordinated by fundraising site DonorsChoose.org, which allows teachers in disadvantaged US schools to bid for private donations to fund classroom projects. The Bloggers' Challenge (later Social Media Challenge) invited blog fans to compete to raise greater sums in donations than could readers of other blogs. Bunting pledged to shave her head in exchange for her readership raising $30,000 in donations. She again won the 2007 contest for Tomato Nation by raising $100,000 through reader donations, from an estimated reader base of 100,000 people. The feat was repeated with a $111,000 reader donation haul in 2008, and $314,158 of reader donations again won the challenge for Tomato Nation in 2009.

== Other writing ==
Bunting has been a contributor to MSNBC, Salon, and New York Magazine. Her original play The Famous Ghost Monologues was performed at the Abingdon Theater, off-off-Broadway, in 2004.

She is currently a writer for (and the editor-in-chief of) the true crime publication Best Evidence.

== Podcasts ==
Sarah and Mark Blankenship started the Mark and Sarah Talk About Songs podcast in March 2016, a weekly pop music podcast that contains in-depth and humorous discussions of individual songs chosen by the hosts or the fans. Starting with episode 50 every tenth episode ranks every song on an album. Ranked episodes include Indigo Girls, GHV2, Sgt. Pepper's Lonely Hearts Club Band, Jagged Little Pill, and The Clueless Soundtrack.

Sarah is also a cohost of the podcasts Extra Hot Great (about television shows), Again With This: Beverly Hills, 90210 & Melrose Place, and Quaid in Full (which ranks Dennis Quaid's television appearances).

Sarah was the host of the true crime podcast The Blotter Presents, which was the flagship podcast of the true crime website The Blotter; she founded The Blotter in 2011.

== Bookstore ownership ==
She is the owner of Exhibit B. Books, a used bookstore that specializes in true crime, located in Brooklyn, New York.

== Personal life ==
Bunting was born and raised in New Jersey and attended Kent Place School and Princeton University, where she majored in English Literature. Prior to the establishment of Tomato Nation she had jobs as a church secretary, a records clerk, and a dealer in antique books. She lives in Brooklyn and got married in July 2013, not changing her last name.

On September 11, 2022, she wrote that her mother had died in the past eleven months, and so had Sarah’s cat, Mabel.
