= The Sir George Robey =

Sir George Robey
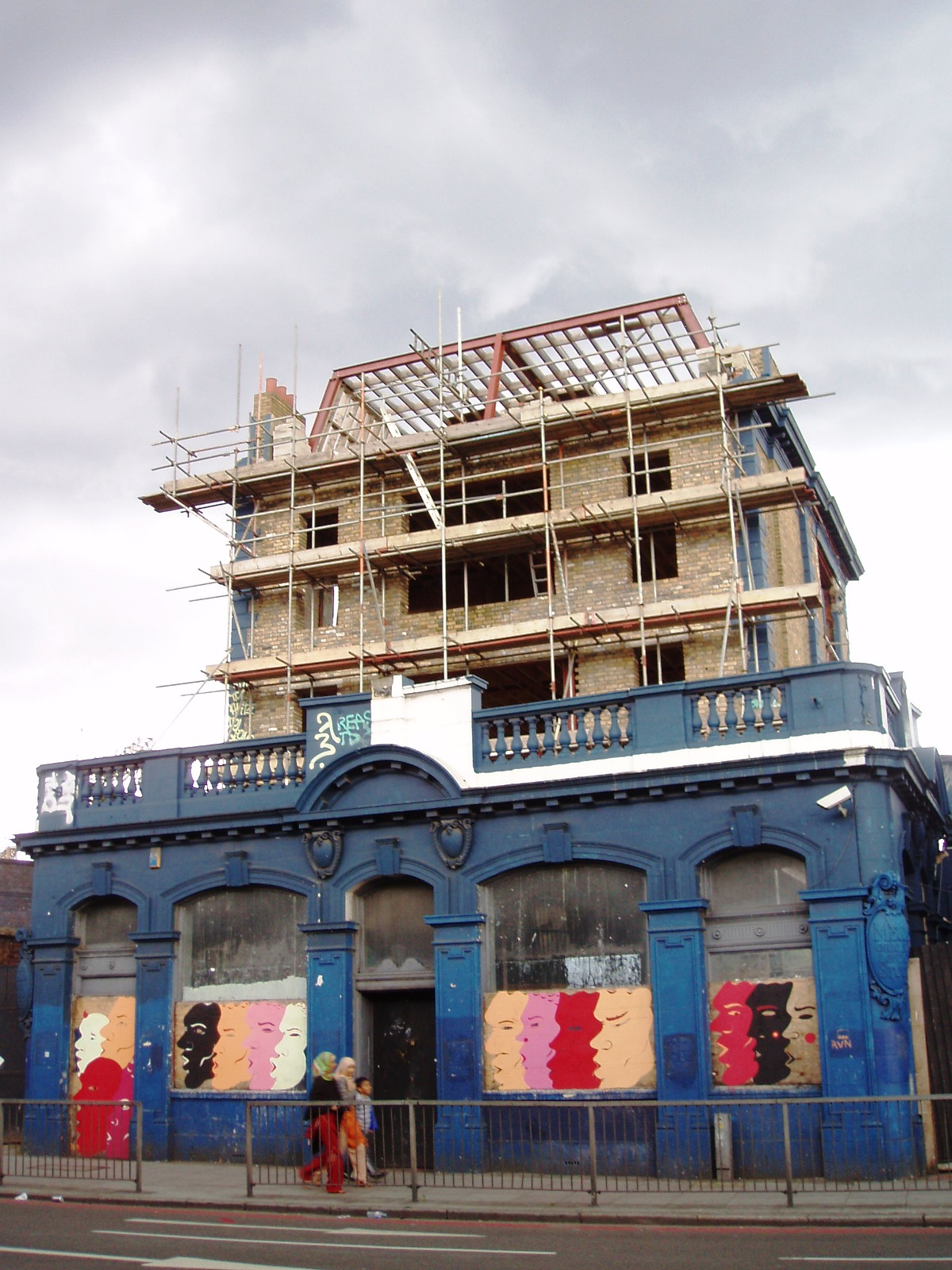
- The pub standing derelict and roofless, in July 2008
- Interactive map of the Sir George Robey area
- Alternative names: The Powerhaus; Robey

General information
- Type: Public house
- Location: 240, Seven Sisters Road, London, United Kingdom
- Coordinates: 51.5631472°N 0.1072636°W
- Opened: mid-19th century
- Demolished: 2015

Design and construction
- Designations: Locally listed

The Sir George Robey was a mid-19th century public house and later a music venue on Seven Sisters Road, Finsbury Park, North London, England. It was named in honour of the music hall performer Sir George Robey (1869–1954) in 1968.

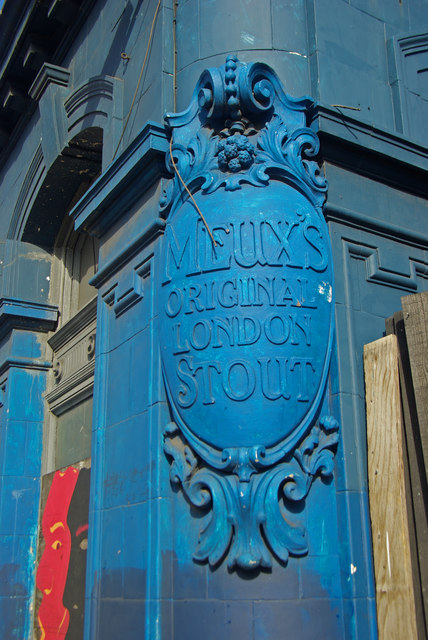
The pub's 'Meux's Original London Stout' plaque

The pub was a Meux's house, and was noted for a plaque advertising their Original London Stout, which remained on the building until its demise, long after the brewery's closure in 1921.

During its time as a music venue, artists who performed at the Sir George Robey include Bad Manners, Billy Bragg, Carter USM, Desmond Dekker, Fairport Convention, Gong, Hawkwind, Bert Jansch, Roy Harper, Ralph McTell, They Might Be Giants, Squarepusher, Fugazi and Tunnelmen. Blur's Damon Albarn recalled:

That was right at the start of Blur. Graham [Coxon] and Alex [James] were still at Goldsmiths so we were just doing our first gigs. First on the bill at an indie all-dayer at the George Robey pub in Finsbury Park which meant we were on at eleven in the morning and just got pissed for the rest of the day, taking advantage of the beer coupons.

Live albums recorded at the venue include Steve Marriott's Packet of Three's Live at the Sir George Robey 23-10-85. The pub also hosted punk and ska all-nighters, and 'Club Dog' acid-house nights.

After being renamed The Powerhaus in March 1996, when it was taken over by the Mean Fiddler Music Group, and later named Robey, it closed in 2004.

Despite being locally listed, the building was demolished in 2015, after a period standing derelict, during which it was occupied by squatters and had its interior fittings and floors removed. A Premier Inn hotel now occupies the site.

The pub was directly opposite another, larger, music venue, the Rainbow Theatre.

The fictitious venue The Harry Lauder in Nick Hornby's book High Fidelity was based on The Sir George Robey. Near the end of Irvine Welsh's novel Trainspotting the characters Sick Boy and Begbie visit The Sir George Robey.
