= Marc Breslow =

American television director (1925–2015)

- Born: July 7, 1925; Kansas City, Missouri, United States
- Died: December 1, 2015 (aged 90); West Hills, California, United States
- Occupation: television director
- Years active: 1960s–1990s
- Awards: Daytime Emmy Award for Outstanding Directing in a Game Show (1983, 1984, 1985, 1987)

Marc Breslow (July 7, 1925 – December 1, 2015) was an American television director, specializing in game shows for Mark Goodson Productions. Breslow was the director throughout the CBS and syndicated run of Match Game during the 1970s and early 1980s, as well as the CBS and syndicated run of Card Sharks during the late 1980s, as well as Classic Concentration, during the late 1980s and early 1990s, and was the original director of the 1972 version of The Price Is Right. Breslow was relieved of his position as director of The Price Is Right by Mark Goodson in 1986 due to clashes with the show's former host, Bob Barker. Paul Alter replaced Breslow as director of The Price Is Right, though Breslow remained on The Price Is Right credits until 1996 under the title of Creative Consultant as part of a 10-year, $1 million severance package. He continued to direct other shows for Mark Goodson Productions. Breslow died on December 1, 2015, at the age of 90.

Preceded by none	Director of The Price Is Right; 1972–1986	Succeeded by Paul Alter
