= Velvet Chain =

Alternative rock band

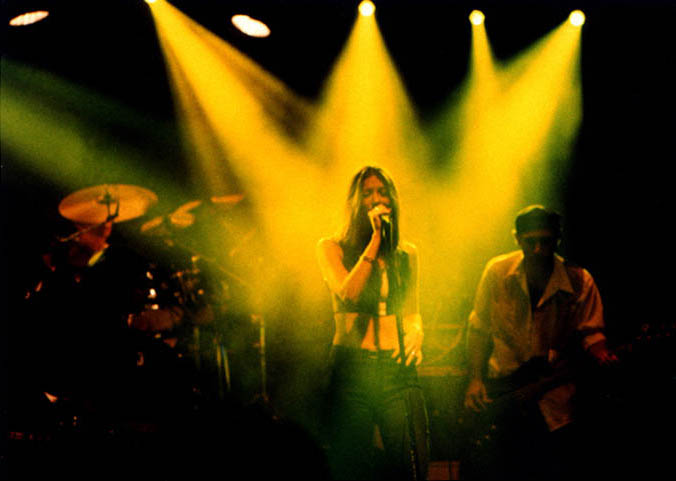
- Velvet Chain performing live at the Key Club in Los Angeles

Background information
- Origin: Los Angeles, US
- Genres: Trip hop, Alternative rock
- Years active: 1993-present
- Label: Freak Records (Band's own Label)
- Members: Erika Amato
- Past members: Jeff Stacy; Brian Reardon; Marc Antonio Pritchett; Dan Wistrom; Brett Chassen; Jeff Mince; Tom Calzini; Sarah Josephs; Craig Van Sant; Andre de Channes; Jay Stolmack
- Website: www.thevelvetchain.com

Velvet Chain is a bi-coastal alternative rock band whose sound features a mixture of trip hop, rock, and pop, with a jazz/funk flavor. (The band has sometimes been known to refer to their work as "space-jazz" or "moody groove music" - which is also the title of one of their albums.)

Velvet Chain was formed in 1993 by Jeff Stacy (legal name “Jeffrey Calamusa”) (formerly of “Heat Your Shack” and “Tunnelmental”) and Erika Amato, the creative core of the band.

They found mainstream attention after they appeared on an episode of Buffy the Vampire Slayer, ("Never Kill A Boy On The First Date") and later had a song included in the show's soundtrack.

Their music has also been used on other TV shows, including HBO's Sex and the City, MTV's Road Rules, CBS's Beverly Hills, 90210 and ABC's Big Shots.

The band last played live in 2007. Core founding members Jeff Stacy (Jeffrey Calamusa) and Erika Amato were working on a new album before Jeff's untimely death in August 2020. Erika is continuing to work on the album and plans to release it at a later date.

== Discography ==
- Groovy Side (1996), out of print
- Warm (CD-5) (September, 1997), out of print
- Warm (full length) (December, 1997)
- Frenchie Vinyl (1998), out of print
- The Buffy EP (1999)
- Moody Groove Music (2000)
- Velvet Chain Live at the Temple Bar (2000)
- The Velvet Chain Custom Album (2001), this album allows the buyer to pick the tracks, artwork and title of the album. There are also several preset choices available.
- Asteroid Belt (2003)
- Space Patrol (EP) (2004)

== Members ==
Current members

- Erika Amato - lead vocals

Former members

- Jeff Stacy - bass guitarist
- Brian Reardon - guitar
- Marc Antonio Pritchett - keyboards
- Dan Wistrom - guitar
- Brett Chassen - drums
- Jeff Mince - drums and electronics
- Tom Calzini - guitar
- Sarah Josephs - keyboards
- Craig Van Sant - drums
- Andre de Channes - guitar
- Jay Stolmack - woodwinds

Additional musicians

- A large number of collaborators have also been involved with the various albums. See specific albums articles for more details.
