= Saleemah Abdul-Ghafur =

Author and activist

Saleemah Abdul-Ghafur (born 19 November 1971) is an author and activist focused on faith-based initiatives and gender equality in Islam who currently serves as the chief of staff and chief communications officer at the Bill & Melinda Gates Foundation. She works with Malaria No More, a leading non-profit formed to advance the United Nations Millennium Development Goals by ending malaria-related deaths by 2012. She also consults on a variety of interfaith projects and volunteerism efforts.

== Education ==
Abdul-Ghafur graduated from Kent Place School in 1992 and from Columbia University from 1996.

== Career ==
In April 2008, the US State Department hosted Abdul-Ghafur on an eight-city speaking tour of the United Kingdom to cultivate a conversation about Muslims in the West. On this tour, Abdul-Ghafur spoke at the House of Commons of the United Kingdom and the University of Oxford. She has accepted invitations to speak at a host of educational institutions including Harvard University, Emory University and Yale University. She has been a guest on CNN and National Public Radio and her work has been featured in The Boston Globe, The Atlanta Journal-Constitution and The New York Times.

In addition to work on behalf of women, Abdul-Ghafur's was the associate director of Corporate Volunteerism at Hands On Atlanta, a multimillion-dollar non-profit service provider in the southeast. She has been responsible for sourcing nation's largest service day, Hands On Atlanta Day, which hosted 17,000 volunteers in 250 unique service projects.

Abdul-Ghafur came to Atlanta in 2003 to join the team that produced Azizah magazine, the first and only magazine for American Muslim women. Prior to Abdul-Ghafur's work with Azizah, she was a program officer for Victoria Foundation. Victoria Foundation is among the oldest and largest private foundations and Abdul-Ghafur oversaw $12 million in grants to non-profits.

== Activism ==
Abdul-Ghafur was selected to participate in the Muslim Leaders of Tomorrow retreat hosted by the World Economic Forum in Copenhagen, Denmark in 2006. The Forum convened thirty Muslims leaders from the United States along with their counterparts in Western Europe to strategize about the future of Islam and Muslims in the West. Out of this retreat came a commitment to address gender issues within Muslim communities in the West.

Abdul-Ghafur participated in the seminal events challenging the role of Muslim women in contemporary society. In 2005, she took on establishing women as prayer leaders, a concept that is unprecedented in the American Muslim community, and co-organized the historic woman-led prayer in New York City. In 2004, she participated in a civil action in Morgantown, West Virginia to give women space and voice in American mosques where they have traditionally been banned. To varying degrees, subsequent to these actions Muslim communities throughout the United States and the West have reexamined the ways Muslim women participate in community life. Mosques in San Francisco, New York City and Chicago are among those that actively develop programming for women, have taken down barriers between women and men and allow women to sit on mosque boards.

== Works ==
Abdul-Ghafur is the editor for Living Islam Out Loud: American Muslim Women Speak (Beacon Press), the first anthology collecting the voices of American Muslim women. The book presents American Muslim women dealing with the complexity of forging their own identities while contributing powerfully to public life. Contributors include poet and author Suheir Hammad, and journalist Asra Nomani. Living Islam Out Loud has received some attention from both the mainstream and Muslim press. She has attracted controversy for publicizing in The New York Times her marriage to the man she later accused of being abusive in her book.

Abdul-Ghafur presents frequently at workshops, seminars and conferences about popular culture, Islam and women. She contributed to the coming of age anthology, What Your Mama Never Told You: True Stories about Sex and Love (Graphia 2007). Abdul-Ghafur also contributes to online ezines and blogs. A recent piece, "A Hajj for the Children of Mali", described a historic delegation's pilgrimage to Mali to save the lives of African children and appeared on Beacon Press' blog, Beacon Broadside. Other online pieces include "Holla if you Hear Me", (Naseeb.com) a look at ethnic divisions in the American Muslim community and "Preach from the Ashes," (pmuna.org) her personal account of the historic woman-led prayer.

== Affiliations ==
Abdul-Ghafur was a board member of the Progressive Muslim Union of North America. She is a member of Atlanta Habitat for Humanity's advisory board and the WOMENBUILD steering committee. Abdul-Ghafur serves on the Atlanta Women's Foundation's Faith, Feminism and Philanthropy steering committee. This committee is the Atlanta-based representation of the national conversation to bridge the divide between faithful and secular feminists around a common agenda of women's empowerment. Saleemah has been a guest on CNN and NPR and her work has been featured in The Boston Globe, The Atlanta Journal-Constitution and The New York Times. Abdul-Ghafur graduated from Kent Place School, and Columbia University.
