= Erika Amato =

American singer, actress (b. 1969)

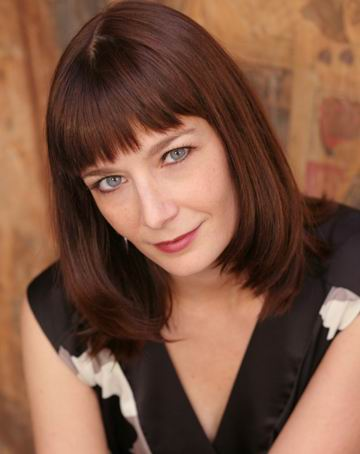
- Amato, c. 2007
- Born: December 7, 1969 (age 56); Plainfield, New Jersey, U.S.
- Education: Vassar College (AB)
- Occupations: Actress, singer
- Years active: 1992–present

Erika Amato (born December 7, 1969) is an American singer, actress and a founding member of the band Velvet Chain.

== Early life and education ==
Amato was born in Plainfield, New Jersey, and grew up in nearby Mountainside. She started playing and performing music at the age of three. Amato attended the all-girls Kent Place School (receiving the Drama Award upon graduation) and then Vassar College, earning a Bachelor of Arts degree in drama. While at Vassar, she performed in the Music Department's a cappella group, the Madrigals, and in the student-managed coeducational a cappella group, Matthew's Minstrels.

== Career ==
After Vassar, Amato moved to Los Angeles to pursue an acting career and was cast as a guest star on popular TV series Quantum Leap, garnering her a SAG card. In the mid-1990s, she founded Velvet Chain with her now-deceased husband, Jeff Stacy. The indie band was most famous for appearances on the TV series Buffy the Vampire Slayer and the subsequent soundtrack album on TVT Records. The band has also self-released several albums on its own label, Freak Productions, and members continue to write and record material.

The entertainer continues to perform and has relocated to New York City, where she has been in numerous productions, including the Off-Broadway musicals The Sphinx Winx and Signs of Life. She has also appeared in several films over the years, including the lead in indie film A Couple of Days and Nights and in musicals throughout North America, including the First National Tour of Flashdance the Musical, Into the Woods (Ocean State Theatre Company - Broadway World Award Nomination for Best Actress in a Musical), Sleeping Beauty Wakes (Center Theatre Group - Ovation Award Nomination for Best Featured Actress in a Musical), Paint Your Wagon (Geffen Playhouse), Nine (Chance Theater - OC Weekly Award Nomination for Best Actress in a Musical), 42nd Street (Welk Resort Theatre), and Anything Goes (Candlelight Pavilion - Inland Theatre League Awards Nomination for Best Actress in a Musical).

She also does voice work for TV shows and films, most recently for the PBS animated series Danger Rangers and Disney feature film Enchanted.

Amato appeared on the TV competition Win Ben Stein's Money, and won. She was also a contestant on Jeopardy!, but did not win.

== Filmography ==
=== Film ===
Year	Title	Role	Notes
2001	Smack	Mr. Snooper	
2005	A Couple of Days and Nights	Jula Diva	
2020	The Half of It	Arguing Woman in Restaurant	Uncredited
2021	The God Committee	Research Scientist	Uncredited

=== Television ===
Year	Title	Role	Notes
1992	Quantum Leap	Lt. Anna Guri	2 episodes
1995	Bringing up Jack	Sandy	Episode: "The Contest"
1997	Buffy the Vampire Slayer	Band Member	Episode: "Never Kill a Boy on the First Date"
2005	Magical Girl Lyrical Nanoha A's	Momoko Takamachi	Episode: "Hajimari wa totsuzen ni nano"
2009	The Message Board	Dita Malone	Episode: "What Makes a Legend Least?"
2018	You	Costumed Dickens Festival-Goer	Episode: "The Captain"
2020	The Homemade Sketch Show	Musical Guest	Episode: "Host-Matt O'Brien, Musical Guest-Erika Amato of Velvet Chain"
2021	Power Book III: Raising Kanan	White Sales Lady	Episode: "Stay in Your Lane"
