= Television Without Pity =

Former website

- Television Without Pity's logo, including its mascot "Tubeelzebub"
- Website type: Online collection of television series recaps and related discussion forums
- Dissolved: April 2017; 9 years ago
- Owner: Nexstar Media Group
- Creators: David T. Cole, Tara Ariano, Sarah D. Bunting, various contributors
- Commercial: Yes
- Launched: 1998; 28 years ago
- Current status: Defunct

Television Without Pity (often abbreviated TWoP) was a website that provided detailed recaps of select television dramas, situation comedies and reality TV shows along with discussion forums. These recaps were written with sarcastic criticism and opinion alongside a retelling of an episode's events, which the site referred to as "snark". Their official motto is "Spare the snark, spoil the networks", a takeoff on "spare the rod, spoil the child", and its mascot is Tubeelzebub (a portmanteau of tube and Beelzebub, "Tubey" for short), a devilish television set with horns and a pointed tail.

Initially established in 1998 to recap the show Dawson's Creek, the site changed its name to Mighty Big TV when it expanded to other shows. It adopted the Television Without Pity name by 2002. The site was acquired by NBCUniversal in 2007, which continued to operate it until it was shuttered in April 2014. Sometime after this point, the site and branding was acquired by Tribune Media, who had announced plans in 2016 for a relaunch, but this was scrapped among other cost-cutting measures at Tribune in April 2017. The site's recap and forum archives remained available at the BrilliantButCancelled website until the archives went down in late 2021.

Television Without Pity is credited with popularizing the format of television episode recaps intermixed with running commentary. The site was also known to be used by television show producers, directors, and writers to gain more immediate feedback for their works and take in the constructive criticism for their future works.

== History ==
The site began in late 1998 by Sarah Bunting and Tara Ariano, with technical support from David Cole, as an online forum driven by discussion of the show Dawson's Creek, then named DawsonsWrap. Their commentary specifically focused on the show's central character Dawson Leery, and Bunting said that this had caught their attention because "insidious, sexist, lazy writing had us apoplectic, not least because we're supposed to identify with a character who, on his best day, is an obnoxious, self-absorbed twit." Their activities included writing recaps of each episode intermixed with their criticism, establishing the use of sarcastic criticism or "snark" within these recaps. Though they did not believe they had a direct impact on Dawson's Creek itself, they felt that by the end of the show's run, they had seen a change in the show's writing that seemed to take the show's critics to heart.

The DawsonsWrap format was popular, and by 1999, they expanded to include other shows with a similar approach, rebranding the site as Mighty Big TV. Around 2002, the site continued to expand and rebranded itself as Television Without Pity, providing the slogan "Spare the Snark, Spoil the Networks".

In 2006, Ariano and Bunting published a Television Without Pity spinoff book, called Television Without Pity: 752 Things We Love to Hate (and Hate to Love) About TV.

In March 2007, the site was purchased by the Bravo unit of NBCUniversal for an undisclosed sum. Television Without Pity was expected to run independently under this acquisition, with Bunting and Ariano remaining in full editorial control of the site. Bravo had anticipated using the site's two million unique visitors at the time to enhance revenues from online advertising, recognizing that most visitors to Television Without Pity were devotees of one or more specific shows.

A year after Bravo's acquisition, founders Bunting, Ariano, and Cole all announced they were departing Television Without Pity. Around the same time, the site was redesigned and expanded to include features such as a wiki, videos, and a subsection "Movies without Pity".

NBCUniversal announced on March 27, 2014, that it would close down Television Without Pity on April 4, with the forums remaining open until May 31; this closure was announced alongside that of DailyCandy, and a few months after closure of iVillage, both websites acquired through NBCUniversal and its subsidiaries. NBCUniversal had tried to shop the site around, and find ways to monetize its content better, but could not find a way to make the site viable in that then-current environment. Initially, the site's archives were to have been stored electronically and not available to the public, but by demand, NBCUniversal affirmed it would make the recaps and archives of the forums available after the site's closure. The archives were eventually hosted under the Brilliant But Cancelled website, which operated without issues until June 2021, when the archives vanished entirely from the Internet and have not (as of November 2025) returned.

At some point following the site's closure, the Television Without Pity branding and website were acquired by Tribune Media. In a statement to The A.V. Club in April 2016, Tribune Media said they were in plans to relaunch the brand and were "working with some of the industry's favorite talent, influencers and strategic partners on a relaunch". The Television Without Pity site was updated with a teaser image with Tubeelzebub and the text "Something wicked this way comes... returning in 2017". However, the relaunch plans were scrapped by Tribune Media April 2017, alongside other cost-cutting measures, including layoffs and shuttering of new editorial content at Screener.

== Show recaps and forums ==
Recaps differed in styles: some of the recappers wrote shorter, more concise recaps while others wrote more comically, inserting references to their personal life. Beginning in 2007, TWoP introduced "weecaps" – initially presented as single-page television series reviews written in real time. The abbreviated recap style – first used for coverage of The Real World/Road Rules Challenge and Dancing with the Stars during the spring – was later employed for a larger slate of summer replacement series, with eventual reconfiguring into multi-page entries. Shows with weecaps also gained dedicated forums with topic areas as with regularly recapped shows.

Shows canceled by the network (or deemed to be unpopular with the readers of TWoP) were considered to be in permanent hiatus, a status which is rarely reversed except for reality shows: the American version of Big Brother returned to coverage in June 2006 when its All-Stars season began for the first time since its third season; Real World/Road Rules Challenge also returned to the active list in April 2007, with its recapping format switched to a shorter, real-time commentary; and while the site decided after the sixth edition of The Apprentice to stop recaps, The Celebrity Apprentice edition was brought back for coverage. Shows placed into permanent hiatus will generally have their forum threads readable but locked and given a single dedicated thread in the appropriate miscellaneous forum categories; the recaps remain available on the site, though in the "Permanent hiatus" section. There are some exceptions; Doctor Who coverage was put into permanent hiatus after the 2nd season; Glark commented on the action of moving the show to permanent hiatus that "If you want to know what Bit Torrent is, ask a Doctor Who fan". The full Doctor Who threaded forum was retained though moved into the Sci-Fi show category and remains fully active with moderation. The 2005 remake of Night Stalker holds the record for the shortest run on TWoP, having been put on Permanent Hiatus after only one recap, although the 2005 series Sex, Love & Secrets was expunged before even one recap, due to incredibly low viewer response in the forums. The shows covered are almost exclusively American, with the exceptions of the new series of Doctor Who, which is a British import to American television, and the original British version of Queer as Folk, which was a British import to Canadian television. Both shows are Russell T Davies productions.

At times, the site offered a charity auction for "Tubey's Kids", whereby the person with the largest donation could request a recap of a specific episode or show (no longer than one hour) by any specific recapper. The results of these recaps were posted as "Mondo Extras" on the site.

The forum for each active show included threads for each episode of a show, a speculation thread, spoiler information, media references to the show, character/contestant-specific threads, and a general "meet market" for forum users. The forums were heavily moderated by staff to avoid significant off-topic discussion, unprotected spoiler information, and flame wars.

== Impact ==
Television Without Pity was known to have established the use of recapping with commentary as a viable genre of criticism alongside a social space as to talk about shows. Television Without Pity predated the growth of social media, but through its forums established the social nature of watching television shows together. Sites like The A.V. Club grew from this type of approach, and social media is used heavily by television networks and fans alike to discuss shows as they occur in real time.

Some television actors, directors, writers, and producers have been known to visit the website. The site's founders refer to a point in 2000 when The West Wing creator Aaron Sorkin posted in the forums, at one point upset over the snark in one of the show's recaps. His experience is believed to have inspired the episode "The U.S. Poet Laureate", in which a character posts on White House Deputy Chief of Staff Joshua Lyman's fansite and is vehemently attacked by members of the forum for his beliefs and his violation of the forum rules. However, most others saw Television Without Pity's recaps and forums to be useful feedback. John Wells and J. J. Abrams have spoken to the value of Television Without Pity in developing their shows. Both CBS and The WB Network executives have used Television Without Pity to judge how to approach and market shows.

For several years, members of the TWoP community organized "TARCon" in New York City, a viewing party for the season finale of The Amazing Race. The party was attended by many of the show's contestants from current and past seasons.

== Notable alumni ==
During its height and after its closure, TWoP was a jumping-off point for writers about television and popular culture. In 2013, the sites' founders started a new website, Previously.tv, that provided a similar style of recapping and forums, as well as writing for various media outlets. It was renamed Primetimer.com in 2019. While the site stopped publishing articles in 2024, the forums remained active, with the site under the management of Jed Rosenzweig. In June 2025 the Primetimer platform was acquired by the Indian company Nazara Technologies's subsidiary Sportskeeda.

Jessica Morgan and Heather Cocks, co-founders of Go Fug Yourself, met while recapping for TWoP. Linda Holmes, host of the NPR podcast Pop Culture Happy Hour and editor of NPR's pop culture and entertainment blog (formerly known as Monkey See), got her writing start with recaps of The Amazing Race. Stephen Falk recapped several reality TV shows at TWoP as he was transitioning from movie screenwriting to television, and since has become a producer for several television shows, including Orange Is the New Black and Weeds, along with being the creator, writer and showrunner of You're the Worst.

Founders Tara Ariano, Sarah D. Bunting, and David T. Cole have hosted a podcast about television, Extra Hot Great, since 2013. Many TWoP contributors have appeared on the podcast as guests.

== See also ==
- BuddyTV
