= McCarter =

McCarter is a surname of Scottish and Irish origin. Notable people with the name include:

- Andre McCarter (born 1953), American basketball player
- Billy McCarter (1888–1941), Australian rules footballer who played for Geelong in the VFL
- Brooke McCarter (1963–2015), American musician and actor
- Chris McCarter of Ikon, a band from Melbourne, Australia
- Gordon McCarter (1931–2002), American football official in the National Football League (NFL)
- Graeme McCarter (born 1992), international cricketer who represents Ireland
- Harold McCarter Taylor (1907–1995), New Zealand-born mathematician, physicist and historian of architecture
- Henry Bainbridge McCarter (1864–1942), American illustrator and painter
- James W. McCarter (1872–1939), ran for Governor of South Dakota in 1914
- Janet McCarter Woolley (1906–1996), American bacteriologist
- Jim McCarter (born 1936), American football fullback and amateur heavyweight boxer
- Jim McCarter (footballer) (1923–2002), Scottish professional footballer
- John W. McCarter (born 1938), American business executive and public educator
- Keith McCarter, Scottish sculptor, with several works on public display
- Kyle McCarter (born 1962), Republican member of the Illinois Senate, representing the 51st district since February 2009
- Layla McCarter (born 1979), American professional boxer
- Lloyd G. McCarter (1917–1956), Private in the United States Army, awarded the Medal of Honor
- Margaret Hill McCarter (1860–1938), American schoolteacher and novelist
- P. Kyle McCarter Jr. (born 1945), Old Testament scholar
- Robert H. McCarter (1859–1941), American lawyer who served as the Attorney General of New Jersey
- Roy McCarter, rugby league footballer
- Steffin McCarter (born 1997), American track and field athlete who competes in the long jump
- Steve McCarter (born 1947), retired American educator and politician
- Thomas N. McCarter (1824–1901), American politician and lawyer from New Jersey
- Thomas N. McCarter (1867–1955), American lawyer who served as the Attorney General of New Jersey
- William H. McCarter (1898–1959), American academic and college athletics administrator
- Willie McCarter (1946–2023), retired American basketball player

== See also ==
- 14463 McCarter, main-belt asteroid
- McArtor
- McCarter & English, law firm in New Jersey, United States
- McCarter Theatre, not-for-profit, professional company on the campus of Princeton University in Princeton, New Jersey
- Tyson McCarter Place, homestead located in the Great Smoky Mountains of Sevier County, in the U.S. state of Tennessee
