= Pingry (disambiguation) =

Pingry may refer to:

- Pingry School, in New Jersey
- John F. Pingry (1818–1893), an American Presbyterian minister
- William M. Pingry (1806–1885), an attorney from Vermont
- The Pingry E.P., an album by Tally Hall
