= Senator Applegate =

Senator Applegate may refer to:

- Douglas Applegate (1928–2021), Ohio State Senate
- James L. Applegate (1931–2016), Wyoming State Senate
- John Stilwell Applegate (1837–1916), New Jersey State Senate
