= Senator McCarter =

Senator McCarter may refer to:

- Kyle McCarter (born 1962), Illinois State Senate
- Thomas N. McCarter (1867–1955), New Jersey State Senate
