= Pingry School =

Private school in New Jersey, US

The Pingry School

Location
- Basking Ridge and Short Hills and Pottersville, New Jersey; United States; 40°37′11.9″N 74°34′02″W

Information
- Type: Private Day school
- Motto: Maxima reverentia pueris debetur. The greatest respect is due students.
- Established: 1861; 165 years ago
- NCES School ID: 02043698
- Headmaster: Timothy P. Lear
- Faculty: 118 FTEs
- Enrollment: 841 (as of 2017–18)
- Average class size: 16 students in Lower School, 14 in Middle School, 13 in Upper School
- Student to teacher ratio: 7.1:1
- Campus size: 303 acres (123 ha)
- Colors: Blue and White
- Athletics: 20 varsity sports
- Athletics conference: Skyland Conference
- Mascot: Big Blue (bear)
- Team name: Big Blue
- Newspaper: The Pingry Record
- Endowment: $91 million
- Budget: $46 million
- Tuition: $54,795 (2025–26 for grades 9–12)
- Website: pingry.org

The Pingry School is a coeducational, independent, college preparatory country day school in New Jersey, with a Lower School (K–5) campus in the Short Hills neighborhood of Millburn, a Middle (6–8) and Upper (High) School (9–12) campus in the Basking Ridge section of Bernards Township, and a campus for experiential learning in Pottersville. The school was founded in 1861 by John F. Pingry. The school has been accredited by the Middle States Association of Colleges and Schools.

== Student body ==
The school currently enrolls 1,129 students; 288 at Short Hills and 841 at Basking Ridge; 270 in the Middle School and 571 in the Upper School. Students come from 100 area communities in twelve counties and over 90 municipalities in New Jersey.

As of the 2017–18 school year, the middle and upper schools had an enrollment of 841 students and 118 classroom teachers (on an FTE basis), for a student–teacher ratio of 7.1:1. The school's student body was 48.5% (408) White, 22.0% (185) two or more races, 18.1% (152) Asian, 9.0% (76) Black and 2.1% (18) Hispanic.

In 2022, the SAT and ACT scores for the middle 50% of students were 1290-1540 and 30-34, respectively.

The school claims an acceptance rate across all of its grades of 12%.

== Awards and recognition ==
Niche ranks Pingry 1st on its list of 2023 Best Private K-12 Schools in New Jersey and 2nd on its list of Best College Prep Private High Schools in New Jersey. Over the years, Pingry has been frequently ranked by Niche in the top 3 in New Jersey and in the top 1% nationally.

== History ==
Pingry School was founded by John Francis Pingry, a Presbyterian minister, in 1861 to provide both scholastic training and moral education for boys. The outbreak of the American Civil War that year caused enrollment to dry up at the Pingry Select School for Boys, an academy Pingry had founded in 1854 in Roseville. After learning that the only professional educator in Elizabeth, New Jersey, had decided to enlist in the Union Army, Pingry moved to Elizabeth in 1861 where he founded the Pingry School. Although Pingry gave talks on Proverbs and used the Bible for instructional purposes, the school has never been affiliated with any church or denomination.

The school moved from the Elizabeth schoolhouse to the Parker Road campus in 1893. After Pingry's death in 1893, several headmasters with relatively short tenures held his position.

C. Mitchell Froelicher was headmaster from 1917 to 1920. He was succeeded by Charles Bertram Newton who focused on the Country Day School philosophy and served until 1936. From 1936 to 1961, E. Laurence Springer was headmaster, and his tenure was the longest in Pingry's history. He oversaw the 1953 move from Elizabeth to Hillside, New Jersey, and a new facility constructed at a cost of $1.6 million (equivalent to $19.3 million in 2025).

Early in the 1970s, Pingry began the transition to a coeducational school. The first female students, who graduated in 1976, were succeeded by other young women who today represent half the student body. Pingry grew with its 1974 merger with the Short Hills Country Day School to become a school with grades from kindergarten through grade 12. In this period of about twenty years, David C. Wilson and H. Wescott Cunningham each served as headmaster.

In 1983, the school moved to Martinsville, a rural area in the Watchung and Somerset Hills. The campuses are approximately 25 minutes apart, and both are located near the New York metropolitan area, which continues to provide many outside resources to supplement the classroom. The old campus in Hillside is now used as a campus of Kean University. In 2013, the Martinsville location was renamed to "Basking Ridge" in an effort to make it easier to locate the campus using automated mapping tools.

In 1987, John Hanly became headmaster. He served until 2000. Today, the Hanly Lecture on Ethics and Morality holds his name. John Neiswender became headmaster after Hanly, and served until 2005. Nathaniel Conard was headmaster from July 2005 to mid-2019. In late 2018, the school announced that Matt Levinson, of University Prep in Seattle, would be Head of School after Conard retired in mid-2019. Since Pingry's day, there have been 16 headmasters.

Pingry School's motto is Maxima reverentia pueris debetur, a Latin phrase literally meaning "the greatest respect is owed to the boys." Since becoming co-educational, the school has modified the motto's translation to "the greatest respect is due to the students." John Pingry's personal motto, "The fear of the Lord is the beginning of wisdom" (Prov. 1:7), hangs as a sign in the C.B. Newton Library located at the Basking Ridge Campus.

In April 2020, the school received an unspecified amount in federally backed small business loans as part of the Paycheck Protection Program. The school received scrutiny over this loan, which was meant to protect small and private businesses. Treasury Secretary Steven Mnuchin tweeted that the schools should return the money, but Levinson stated they were keeping it, despite having an $80-million-plus endowment, due to the "significant challenges to our ability to serve our community" caused by the pandemic.

In February 2021, Purnell School announced that it would cease operations upon the completion of the 2020–2021 academic year. Later that year, Pingry School paid $5 million for the 82-acre (33 ha) campus in Pottersville in Somerset County, which will be used as an extension of its existing campuses.

In June 2022, alumnus, head of college counseling and cross-country coach, Timothy Lear assumed the role of headmaster.

== Athletics ==
The Pingry School Big Blue competes in the Skyland Conference, which is comprised of public and private high schools in Essex, Morris, and Somerset counties in west central New Jersey, and operates under the jurisdiction of the New Jersey State Interscholastic Athletic Association. Pingry is also a member of the New Jersey Independent School Athletic Association. Prior to the NJSIAA's 2010 realignment, the school had previously participated in the Colonial Hills Conference which included public and private high schools covering Essex County, Morris County and Somerset County in west Central Jersey. With 435 students in grades 10-12, the school was classified by the NJSIAA for the 2019–20 school year as Non-Public A for most athletic competition purposes, which included schools with an enrollment of 381 to 1,454 students in that grade range (equivalent to Group I for public schools). The school was classified by the NJSIAA as Non-Public Group B (equivalent to Group I/II for public schools) for football for 2024–2026, which included schools with 140 to 686 students.

The school offers 33 varsity teams, with a total of over 70 teams covering seventh to twelfth grade. Many of the school's athletes have been recognized as athletic scholars, and many have gone on to play for college teams. In addition, the school's facilities include two full-court gymnasiums, a 25-meter indoor pool, a state of the art weight and aerobics room with full-time trainers, athletic training room with full-time staff, full locker rooms for women, men and visiting teams, The Miller Bugliari '52 World Cup Field (which has hosted World Cup practices for the '95 Italian National team, the '02 United States National team, and the '13 Ecuadorian National Team) for soccer and baseball, Parsons Field ( which offers stadium seating, a press-box and a scoreboard with a sound system) for football, lacrosse and track and field events, 212 acres (0.86 km^{2}) total that allow for a cross-country course, 12 tennis courts, and numerous practice fields including the John Taylor Babbitt '07 Memorial Field. The Miller A. Bugliari Athletic Complex was opened in 2017 and includes eight squash courts, two basketball gyms and a weight room.

Pingry's soccer program has been led by Coach Miller Bugliari, who has coached the team for more than 60 years. His 765 wins through 2011 ranked him as the second-winningest boys' soccer coach in the nation. Bugliari was inducted into the National High School Hall of Fame in 2018, in recognition of his 58-year career coaching record of 850–116–75. The boys soccer team won the Non-Public Group B state championship in 1995 (defeating Bishop Eustace in the finals), 1996 (vs. Wildwood Catholic High School) and 2014 (vs. Hawthorne Christian Academy), and won the Non-Public A title in 2001 (vs. Christian Brothers Academy), 2006 (vs. Christian Brothers), 2008 (vs. St. Augustine Preparatory School). The 2006 team finished the season with a 16-2-2 record after winning the Parochial A state title by beating Christian Brothers Academy by a score of 1–0 in the tournament final; during the season, the team also beat Don Bosco Prep, Delbarton School and Seton Hall Prep along the way, which (together with Christian Brothers) accounted for each of the previous four years' playoff losses. In 2007 the men's team climbed to fifth nationally. The girls' soccer team won the 2001 Parochial North A state sectional championship with a 1–0 win vs. Immaculate Heart Academy.

The boys' fencing team was overall state champion in 1989. A total of 11 Pingry fencers have won individual state championships, the second-most in the state, including two in foil, six in sabre and three in épée.

The baseball team won the Non-Public Group B state championship in 1994, defeating St. Augustine Preparatory School in the tournament final.

The boys cross country running team won the Non-Public Group B state championship in 1989-1992, 2003, 2005, 2006, 2012 and 2013. The program's nine state titles are tied for sixth-most in the state. In the 2005 and 2006 school years, the team won the conference championship as well as the Non-Public B state championship.

The girls tennis team won the Non-Public Group B state championship in 1991 (defeating Moorestown Friends School in the final match of the tournament), and won the Non-Public A title in 2002 (vs. Paul VI High School), 2003 (vs. Red Bank Catholic High School), 2004 (vs. Notre Dame High School), 2012 (vs. Kent Place School), 2013 (vs. Academy of the Holy Angels) and 2016 (vs. Kent Place). The program's seven state titles are tied for tenth-most in the state. In 2003, the team didn't lose a single set in a 5–0 win in the finals against Red Bank Catholic. The 2016 team won the Non-Public A title with a 3–2 win against Kent Place in the finals played at Mercer County Park.

The girls' soccer team won the Group I state championship in 1996 (as co-champion with Glen Rock High School), 1998 (vs. Glen Rock), and won the Non-Public A title in 2001 (vs. St. John Vianney High School), 2004 (vs. St. John Vianney), 2006 (vs. Red Bank Catholic High School), 2011 (vs. Red Bank Catholic), 2012 (vs. Immaculate Heart Academy), 2018 (vs. Oak Knoll School of the Holy Child) and 2019 (vs. DePaul Catholic High School) The program's 10 state titles are ranked fourth in the state.

The boys' wrestling team won the Non-Parochial B North state sectional championship in 1998.

The girls' cross country running team won the Non-Public Group A state championship in 1999, and won the Non-Public A title in 2004, 2005, 2008 and 2010.

The field hockey team won the North II Group I state sectional title in 2000, 2001, 2004 and 2005, and won the North I/II combined Group I title in 2003. The team won the Group I state championship in 2000 (defeating runner-up Gloucester City High School in the tournament final), 2001 (vs. Shore Regional High School), 2003 (vs. New Egypt High School) and 2004 (vs. New Egypt). The 2000 team finished the season with a 25–0 record after winning the Group I title with a 4–0 win in the championship game against a Gloucester City team that had only lost once all season and hadn't been shut out all year. The 2003 field hockey team won the Group I state championship with a 2–1 win over New Egypt High School in the tournament's final match. The 2004 team repeated as Group I champion, defeating New Egypt High School in the tournament final.

The girls' outdoor track and field team won the Non-Public Group B state championship in 2001-2007. The program's seven state titles are tied for fifth among all schools in the state.

The boys' lacrosse team won the Non-Public Group B state championship in 2006 (defeating Morristown-Beard School in the final of the playoffs), 2015 (vs. Morristown-Beard), 2016 (vs. Montclair Kimberley Academy), 2017 (vs. Eustace Preparatory School) and 2018 (vs. Immaculata High School) The program's five state title are tied for seventh-most in the state.

The boys track team won the Non-Public Group B spring / outdoor track state championship in 2007, 2009 and 2012.

The boys swimming team won the Non-Public B state title in 1995-1997 and 2008-2020. The program's 16 state titles are ranked fifth in the state while the streak of 13 titles from 2008 to 2020 is the state's longest. The 2013 boys team won all 11 events in the meet and defeated Newark Academy 131–39 in the Non-Public B finals. In 2015, the team won the Non-Public B title with a 119–51 win against Gloucester Catholic High School in the tournament's final match.

The girls swimming team won the Non-Public B state championship in 1997, 1998, 2010, 2014 and 2015.

The girls spring / outdoor track team won the Non-Public B state championship in 2001-2007; the program's seven group titles are tied for seventh in the state and the seven-year streak is tied for second-longest.

The boys track team won the indoor track Non-Public Group B state championship in 2009. The girls team won the Non-Public B title in 2017.

The boys tennis team won the Non-Public Group A state championship in 2014, against runner-up Delbarton School in the final match of the tournament.

The girls track team won the Non-Public Group B state indoor relay championship in 2017.

The girls' fencing team was the épée team winner in 2020.

The Pingry Middle School squash team won the 2013 Middle School Nationals, after reaching their previous best of sixth place overall in 2012. Pingry won their first two rounds by scores of 5–0 vs. Bala Cynwyd / Welsh Valley and Greenwich Country Day School, then defeated second-seeded The Haverford School A team by a score of 3–2 in the semis. In the finals, the team played Brunswick School, the top-ranked middle school team in the country and defending champion. After winning the first two matches, the team held on to win the championship by a 3–2 margin.

The boys' ski team won the NJSIAA state title in 2024.

== Accreditation ==
The Pingry School is accredited by the National Association of Independent Schools, the New Jersey Association of Independent Schools and the New Jersey Department of Education. The Pingry School is a member of the National Association for College Admission Counseling.

== Sexual abuse scandal ==
=== Initial allegations ===
On March 29, 2016, The Pingry School sent a letter to "parents of current students, the entire alumni and school trustees" informing them that the School had "recently learned from a few of our alumni that students were sexually abused by Thad Alton, an employee of Short Hills Country Day School from 1972 to 1974 and, following the merger of the two institutions, an employee of the Pingry School from 1974 to 1978." The letter stated that Pingry had hired a security firm to conduct an investigation on behalf of the school. The letter was signed by Headmaster Nathaniel E. Conard and Jeffrey N. Edwards, chair of the board of trustees.

At that time, Crew Janci LLP, "a law firm that specializes in suing schools and youth organizations for their negligent handling of sexual abuse[,] announced it has been investigating Alton's tenure at Pingry for over a year." Crew Janci LLP's investigation on behalf of the victims was "credited with persuading the 166-year-old [Pingry] school to launch its own investigation[.]" Crew Janci's website made clear that its investigation on behalf of the victims would continue, despite the announcement of the Pingry School's commissioning of an investigation.

On April 1, 2016, The Star-Ledger revealed court documents indicating that Alton had previously been convicted for his sexual abuse of Pingry students. The spokesperson for the Pingry School was quoted as responding to this information by saying: "I'm afraid such a conviction is news to us" and that "[i]t wasn't until recently that the school's current administration knew anything about this situation in the '70s, which prompted us to act".

A news article published on April 8, 2016, detailed how Alton moved from Pingry School in 1978 to The Peck School, "10 miles away in Morristown." The Peck School sent a letter to its alumni explaining "that Alton had nothing but 'positive job references' when he was hired, fresh from six years at the Short Hills Country Day School, which merged with Pingry."

After leaving the Peck School in 1979, Alton continued on as an educator at Clarkson University in Potsdam, New York until he was arrested in December 1989 in relation to his sexual abuse of more than 50 children.

On April 27, 2016, The Star- Ledger ran a report of interviews with several of the victims. Then, on April 28, "Pingry Survivors" – a group of individuals who were sexually abused as children while at Pingry— posted an open letter to the "Pingry Community."

In their open letter, the Pingry Survivors stated their goals as follows: "(1) For the Pingry Community to learn the whole truth about the extent of the problem of child sexual abuse at the Pingry School – including a complete and accurate disclosure about the School's response at the time of the abuse (and since); (2) For The Pingry School to hear, understand, and acknowledge the suffering of each victim and to make meaningful amends; and, (3) For The Pingry School to dedicate itself to ensuring that this history can never be repeated (including an independent review of policies, practices, and culture, as well as implementation of meaningful changes)." The Pingry Survivors went on to say that they "hope that we and the current Pingry School leadership – with the support of the greater Pingry Community – can find a path forward that is collaborative and allows for true healing and reconciliation."

=== Outcome ===
During the year following Pingry's announcement of its investigation in March 2016, the school's child sexual abuse scandal was mentioned in multiple national media reports on private schools with pervasive sexual abuse in their pasts, including Vanity Fair and The New York Times.

On March 28, 2017, The Pingry School released a letter announcing that it had concluded its "independent investigation into the sexual abuse allegations and circumstances surrounding Thad Alton's tenure." The school posted a "Report to the Pingry Community" on a website other than its official page called "www.pingryresponse.org." It is unclear whether the school received a more comprehensive investigative report. The "Report to the Pingry Community" substantiated 27 victims of child sexual abuse by Alton, as well as abuse by other former Pingry faculty and staff.

The school announced that their investigator's report affirms the abuse by former Pingry teacher and assistant Lower School principal Thad Alton. Pingry's investigative report revealed that at least one "school board member learned of Alton's activities in 1979", but that the Pingry School "never shared the information with its faculty, alumni or the family of its students".

The school acknowledged in its letter that "the culture, structure, and policies of the school... allowed such atrocities to occur in the past". The school asserted:

"[W]e are deeply sorry for the pain the survivors have suffered, and are grateful to them for coming forward. In our commitment to ongoing efforts to fully understand and address these troubling events in Pingry's past, we will be engaging with survivors to learn how we can best support them. Our hope is to heal as a community and continue to foster the culture of safety and well-being that our students deserve. This healing requires our continued partnership, collaboration, and candor."

In the days after the release of the Pingry School's report, victims of abuse at Pingry went to the media with their stories about the abuse and the impact it had on their lives. In some of those media reports, the "Pingry Survivors" group asserted "their school knew what was going on" with the abuse at the time it was occurring.

Alton has never been criminally prosecuted for his sexual abuse of most of the Pingry victims. He lives in Manhattan and is a registered sex offender in the State of New York.

On December 4, 2017, an article appeared on the front page of The New York Times detailing Pingry's attempts to invoke to statute of limitations to avoid compensating former students who were victims of sexual abuse at the school.

== Notable alumni ==
- Michael Arrom (class of 2013), keyboardist with Steve Vai, who has appeared on Glee
- John D. Bates (born 1946, class of 1964), Senior Judge of the U.S. District Court for the District of Columbia
- Hanna Beattie (born 1995), ice hockey forward for the Connecticut Whale in the Premier Hockey Federation
- Frank Chapot (1932-2016), equestrian who competed at six Olympic Games from 1956 until his final effort in 1976 where he won two silver medals in the Team Show Jumping
- Mike Chernoff (born 1981, class of 1999), General Manager of the Cleveland Indians
- Michael Chertoff (born 1953), Secretary of United States Department of Homeland Security (2005–2009)
- Buzzy Cohen (born 1985), Jeopardy! champion and guest host, host of The Chase
- William A. Conway (1910–2006), former CEO of Garden State National Bank who missed his last year at Pingry due to illness
- Mael Corboz (born 1994), professional soccer player who plays as a midfielder for SC Verl
- Rachel Corboz (born 1996), professional soccer player who plays as a midfielder for Stade de Reims
- Robert C. Crane (1920–1962), newspaper publisher who was elected to the New Jersey Senate shortly before his death
- Mark Donohue (1937–1975, class of 1955), race car driver, winner of the 1972 Indianapolis 500 and the 1973 Can-Am Championship
- Paul W. Downs (born 1982), Emmy-Award winning actor, writer and director best known for his portrayal of Trey Pucker on the Comedy Central series Broad City
- Steve Elmendorf (class of 1978), deputy campaign manager for Presidential candidate John Kerry, and longtime campaign aide to Richard Gephardt
- Willard F. Enteman (born 1936), eleventh president of Bowdoin College in Brunswick, Maine
- Matthew Fallon, swimmer who competed in the 2024 Summer Olympics
- Nic Fink (born 1993), Olympic swimmer who specializes in breaststroke events
- Michelle Friedland (born 1972, class of 1990), United States Circuit Judge of the United States Court of Appeals for the Ninth Circuit
- Adam Gardner (born 1973, class of 1991), guitarist for the rock band Guster
- Howard Georgi (born 1947, class of 1964), emeritus professor of physics at Harvard University
- Adam Goldstein (born 1988, class of 2006), author and founder/CEO of Hipmunk
- Andrew D. Goldstein, prosecutor and the former chief of the public corruption unit of the United States Attorney's Office for the Southern District of New York
- Benedict Gross (born 1950, class of 1967), mathematics professor
- Andrew Gruel (born 1980, class of 1998), chef, restaurateur and Food Network celebrity
- Miguel Gutierrez (born 1971, class of 1989), choreographer
- William Halsey Jr. (1882–1959), Fleet Admiral in the United States Navy
- Andrew Horowitz (born 1983, class of 2001), green-tied keyboardist and writer of indie rock band Tally Hall
- Amos Hostetter Jr. (born 1937, class of 1954), former CEO and founder of MediaOne, billionaire on Forbes Magazine list
- Joseph E. Irenas (1940–2015, class of 1958), Federal Judge
- Jamie Johnson (born 1979), clothing designer of Black Sweater, documentary film maker, whose documentary films Born Rich and The One Percent appeared on HBO
- Thomas Kean Jr. (born 1968), member of the United States House of Representatives representing New Jersey's 7th congressional district
- Dan Kellner (born 1976), Olympic foil fencer
- Micah Kellner (born 1978, class of 1997), Member of the New York State Assembly
- James C. Kellogg III (1915–1980, class of 1933), former chairman of the New York Stock Exchange and the Port Authority of New York and New Jersey
- Matthew Klapper, attorney who serves as Chief of Staff and Senior Counselor to the Attorney General at the United States Department of Justice
- Andrew Lewis (born 1972, class of 1993), former professional soccer player
- N. Gregory Mankiw (born 1958), former chairman of the Council of Economic Advisers and Harvard University Professor of Economics
- Randy Mastro (born 1956, class of 1973), attorney and government official, who served as deputy mayor of New York City
- Dean Mathey (class of 1908), investor who made millions for Princeton University
- Thomas N. McCarter (1867–1955), Attorney General of New Jersey from 1902 to 1903, founder and president of PSE&G Corporation, developer of Newark Penn Station and original benefactor of the McCarter Theatre in Princeton
- Robert H. McCarter (1859–1941), Attorney General of New Jersey from 1903 to 1908 and well-known New Jersey lawyer, eventually heading the law firm McCarter & English
- Andrew McCarthy (born 1962, class of 1980), actor
- Billy McFarland (born 1991), serial fraudster, convicted felon and founder of the fraudulent Fyre Festival and the fraudulent NYC VIP Access
- Arthur N. Pierson (1867–1957), politician who served as Speaker of the New Jersey General Assembly and President of the New Jersey Senate
- Frederick Reiken (born 1966), novelist
- Ronald C. Rice (born 1968, class of 1986), member of the Municipal Council of Newark from 2006 to 2014
- Rachel Rochat (born 1972), former ice hockey player who competed for the Swiss national team in the women's tournament at the 2006 Winter Olympics
- Jon Sarkin (born 1953, class of 1971), self-taught artist and stroke survivor
- Robert Schriesheim (born 1960, class of 1978), business executive involved in the restructuring of several businesses, including Western Union and Sears
- Meena Seshamani (born 1977/1978), politician and surgeon who has served as the Maryland Secretary of Health since 2025
- Dani Shapiro (born 1962), novelist
- Lee Shelley (born 1956), Olympic épée fencer in 1984 and 1988
- Gaddis Smith (1932–2022, class of 1950), historian, professor at Yale University for over forty years.
- Todd Solondz (born 1959), filmmaker
- John H. Stamler (1938–1990), Union County, New Jersey, prosecutor from 1977 until his death
- Charles August Sulzer (1879–1919), delegate to the United States House of Representatives from the Alaska Territory
- Richard Tregaskis (1916–1973), war correspondent and author of Guadalcanal Diary, the source for the 1943 film of the same name starring William Bendix, Richard Conte, and Anthony Quinn
- MJ Tyson (born 1986, class of 2004), jewelry designer
- Carl Van Duyne (1946–1983), sailor who competed in the Finn event at the 1968 Summer Olympics
- Gillian Vigman (born 1972, class of 1990), actress

== Notable faculty ==
- Stephen Kovacs (1972–2022), saber fencer and fencing coach, charged with sexual assault, died in prison
- George B. Moffat Jr. (1927–2024), author and world champion sailplane pilot
