= Purnell School =

Location
- 51 Pottersville Road; Pottersville, (Somerset County), New Jersey 07979; United States; 40.716°N 74.718°W

Information
- School type: Private, All-Girls, Boarding
- Motto: Fides Et Fidelitas (Faith and Fidelity)
- Religious affiliation: Nonsectarian
- Established: 1963; 63 years ago
- Founder: Carroll Boynton; Lytt Gould, President; Hap Johnson, Treasurer; Sis Gould, Secretary; Ethel Stringfellow
- Closed: 2021
- NCES School ID: A0701539
- Faculty: 15 FTEs
- Grades: 9–12 and Post Graduate
- Gender: All Girls
- Student to teacher ratio: 3.8:1
- Campus size: 83 acres (0.34 km^{2})
- Colors: Red and blue
- Mascot: Griffin
- Team name: The Griffins
- Accreditation: Middle States Association of Colleges and Schools
- Tuition: Boarding (7-day): $73,400; Boarding (5-day): $70,700; Day Student: $53,800
- Graduates: 1,375
- Website: www.purnellschool.org

The Purnell School was a progressive private all-girls boarding high school located in Pottersville, within Bedminster, New Jersey, about an hour and one-half west of New York City, and two hours north of Philadelphia. Purnell School was a member of the New Jersey Association of Independent Schools. The school was accredited in 1973 by the Middle States Association of Colleges and Schools Commission on Secondary Schools. The school officially closed following the 2020–21 academic school year citing "“challenges related to the competitive landscape’’.

As of the 2017–18 school year, the school had an enrollment of 57 students and 15 classroom teachers (on an FTE basis), for a student–teacher ratio of 3.8:1. The school's student body was 61.4% (35) White, 26.3% (15) Black, 7.0% (4) Hispanic and 5.3% (3) Asian.

== History ==
=== 1960s ===
In 1963, Lytt Gould, the headmaster of Far Hills Country Day School departed that institution and established a "school which puts the girl first; a school which values each individual" establishing the Purnell Corporation not-for-profit alongside his wife Sis Gould, and Hap Johnson, and Ethel Stringfellow. In 1964 the corporation purchased an 84-acre (34 ha) acre Bassett Farm in Pottersville mostly due to the connections of Carroll Boynton, an early supporter of the school, in the community as the farm was not on the market at the time. The Gould family did most of the renovation work by themselves, as the barn was converted into a library and classrooms, while Brook House was expanded to make room for the Head of School's family.

The first classes would be held in 1965 consisting of 18 students who would live on campus. The following year the class size increased to 48 and "First House" is constructed and later named Boynton Hall in honor of Carroll Boynton. In 1967 the school started a yearly tradition with the first ever Purnell Fair as a second dormitory - named Custis Hall in honor of Sis Gould's mother - and the dining hall would be constructed, while the first faculty house, later named Johnson House, was also constructed.

In 1968 the school started its yearly "Project Week" which was a school sponsored week long internship program with local businesses, and "Fox Day", a spring fair, as well as the first ever senior class starting another tradition of sailing a canoe down the Delaware River before becoming the first class to graduate. In 1969 the school would build tennis courts and rename the library after Ethel Gray Stringfellow, one of the school's founders, as well as the introduction of a unique school song So Long, Seniors which would be played during every graduation.

=== Closure ===
On February 16, 2021, the Purnell School board of trustees announced their decision that Purnell would cease operations on June 30, 2021.

=== Pingry school ===
In June 2021, the Pingry School announced the acquisition of the Purnell School campus.

In the Purnell School's former Moran Athletic Center, which had been renamed to simply the Athletic Center, the Pingry School has preserved and displays all the various plaques from around the campus, except for the main entrance sign which was purchased by an alumni, Mary Frances Chihunko-Blount. Every year since the closure the Purnell Alumnae Association, in conjunction with the Pingry School, hosts a Visitor's Day in June for former alumni of the school to meet with each other on the former Purnell campus.

== Academics ==
Graduation requirements included 4 years of English, 3 years of math, science and history, 2 years of foreign language, and classes in performing and studio arts.

In addition to traditional classes, students also participated in the Affinities Program, as an additional class and a set of seminars designed to help students find and use their strengths.

Each February, traditional classes were suspended and the school had Project Exploration, a mini-term during which students chose one class to focus on for the entire three-week period. Project Exploration courses have included trips to France, Mexico, Costa Rica, the school's musical production, Culinary Arts, Mass Media, Equine Studies, Animals and Society, Maritime Studies, Interior Design, and many more.

== Athletics ==
Purnell offered a variety of competitive and non-competitive sports throughout the year. Competitive sports included soccer, volleyball, tennis, dance synthesis, basketball, lacrosse and softball. Non-competitive sports included horseback riding, circuit training, dance sport, personal conditioning, yoga and golf.

Purnell competed in the New Jersey Association of Independent Schools Athletic Association - Division B

== Arts ==
The Johnson Art Center hosted classes in drawing, collage, pastels, ceramics, photography, oil painting and fashion design.

The Carney Center for Performing Arts was a 179-seat theater. Student performing groups included Ad-libbers, Dance Synthesis, and Shoots and Strawberries, the choral group.
