= Lamington River =

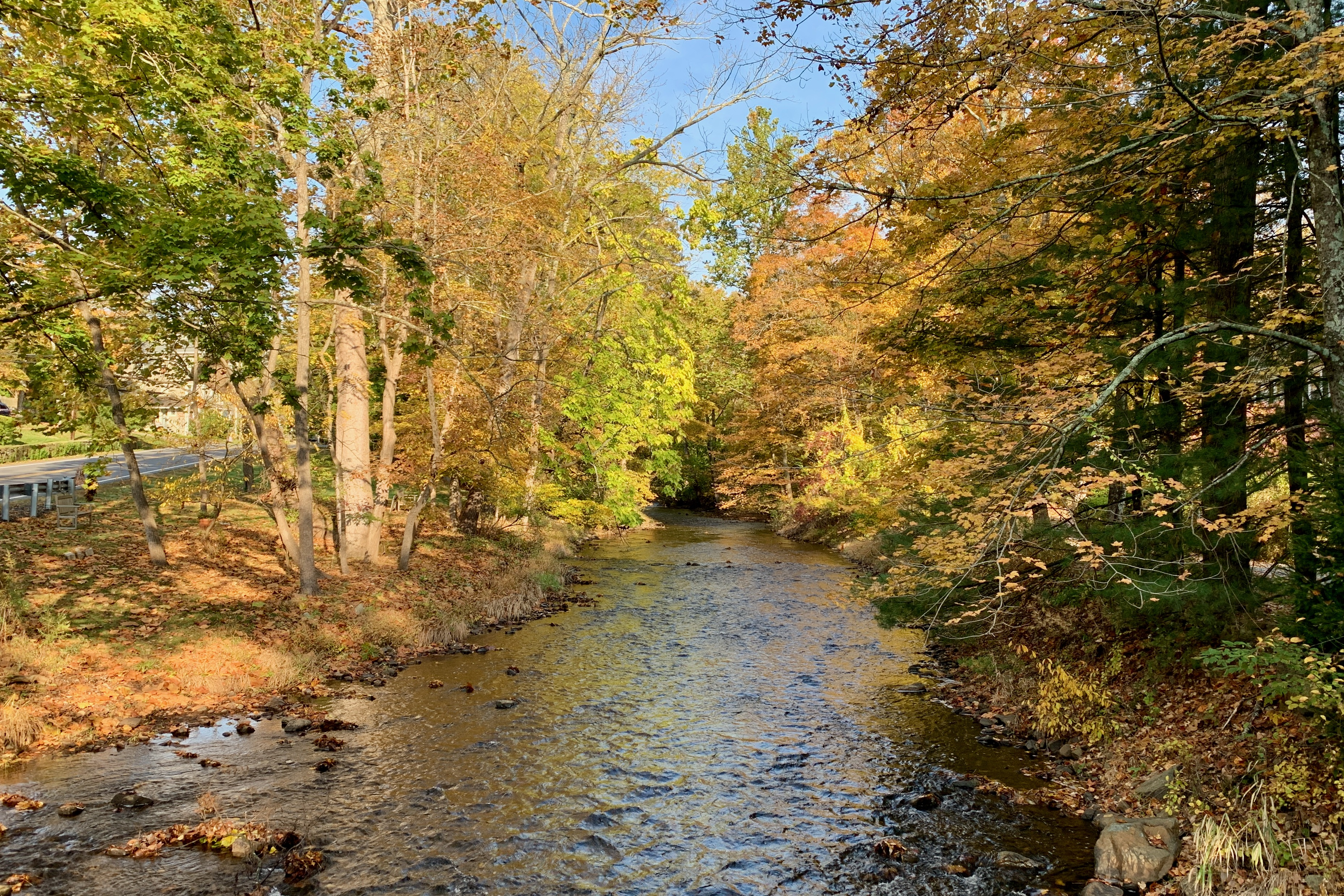
- Lamington River in Pottersville

- Location within Somerset County, New Jersey

Location
- Country: United States
- State: New Jersey
- County: Morris County, Hunterdon County, Somerset County

Physical characteristics
- Mouth: North Branch Raritan River
  - location: Bedminster
  - coordinates: 40°38′03″N 74°40′58″W

Basin features
- River system: Raritan River
- GNIS feature ID: 877658

The Lamington River, known as the Black River upstream of Pottersville, is a tributary of the North Branch Raritan River in central New Jersey in the United States.

== Tributaries ==
- Bamboo Brook
- Cold Brook
- Hollow Brook
- Rockaway Creek
- Tanners Brook

== See also ==
- List of rivers of New Jersey
