= Frederick Reiken =

American novelist (born 1966)

- Born: 1966 (age 59–60); New Jersey, U.S.
- Education: Princeton University (BA); University of California, Irvine (MFA)
- Occupations: Novelist, teacher
- Writing career
- Genres: Novel; Short story
- Notable works: The Odd Sea; The Lost Legends of New Jersey; Day for Night

Frederick Reiken (born 1966) is an American author from Livingston, New Jersey He has published three novels to critical acclaim, and he teaches creative writing at Emerson College.

== Early life and education ==
Reiken was born in New Jersey in 1966, and he attended the Pingry School. He earned a B.A. in biology at Princeton University in 1988, where for his senior thesis he researched the behavioral ecology of island feral horses. He earned an M.F.A. at the University of California, Irvine, in 1992.

Reiken is married and has two daughters.

== Career ==
Reiken credits the five years he spent as a journalist with teaching him a great deal about writing, or what he only half-mockingly refers to as "the art of restraint. I learned very quickly if I wrote anything self-indulgent, it would be chopped out and there would be a gaping hole. To keep the writing good, I had to keep it clean. That generalized to thinking more about the reader and ultimately what was in service to the story."

— Judith Rosen

Reiken began thinking of himself as a writer after a poetry class at Princeton with J. D. McClatchy. In addition, Paul Auster's introductory fiction course and John McPhee's "Literature of Fact" course encouraged him to follow both his passions, science and writing. Following graduation in 1988, he went to the Negev desert as a wildlife biology researcher studying the population dynamics of Persian onagers, a species of wild ass.

After completing his M.F.A., in 1992–1993 he was an artist-in-residence and then assistant director at Cummington Community of the Arts.

From 1992 to 1998, he was a reporter, nature writer, and columnist at the Daily Hampshire Gazette. In 1997 he published his first novel.

In 1992, he began writing sketches that would eventually become his second novel, published in 2000. His third novel was published in 2010.

Reiken's essays and short stories have been published in The New Yorker, Western Humanities Review, Glimmer Train, and The Writer's Chronicle.

Since 1999, Reiken has taught creative writing at Emerson College in Boston.

== Critical response ==
Reiken's first novel, The Odd Sea (1998), won the Hackney Literary Award and was selected one of the best first novels of the year by Library Journal and Booklist. Jane Vandenburgh of The New York Times said the novel covers "mainly psychological terrain", of a family "who must somehow cope with the mysterious disappearance of the oldest son, 16-year-old Ethan...which eloquently remind us that the unfathomable can indeed happen, that the unbearable must be bravely withstood". Judith Rosen wrote it is "a contemporary tale of loss based loosely on The Odyssey". Christopher Lehmann-Haupt said it is "a haunting first novel that takes a horrifying family calamity and turns it into a form of magic... [Reiken] has skillfully balanced this pain against the hopefulness of the narrator."

Reiken's second novel, The Lost Legends of New Jersey (2000), was listed on The New York Times "Notable Book" list. Critic Gary Krist wrote, "Whether he's depicting the mournful uneasiness of two siblings on a last moonlit bike ride or the bewilderment of an estranged father giving himself over to the healing power of a Jacques Cousteau special, Reiken knows how to charge the quietest domestic scenes with consequence and emotion."

His third novel, Day for Night (2010), was favorably reviewed by Patrick Ness of The Guardian, who wrote it is "a portmanteau novel: discrete stories from different points of view that combine to tell a larger narrative". S. Kirk Walsh of The Los Angeles Times wrote, "A thought-provoking, intricate portrait of the far-reaching, intergenerational implications of the Holocaust —and how fortuitous circumstances can bring people from both sides of a tragedy closer together, and, in some cases, further apart."

== Awards and honors ==
- 1997 Hackney Award for First Novel, The Odd Sea
- 2000 New York Times Notable Books of the Year, The Lost Legends of New Jersey
- 2000 Los Angeles Times Best Books of the Year, The Lost Legends of New Jersey
- 2010 Finalist for the Los Angeles Times, Book Prize, Day for Night
- Best novels of 2010, The Washington Post, Day for Night
