= Edmund Wilson Sr. =

American lawyer (1863–1923)

Edmund Wilson
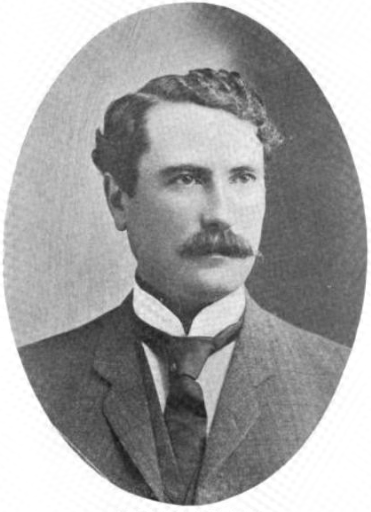

25th Attorney General of New Jersey
- In office 1908–1914
- Governor: John Franklin Fort; Woodrow Wilson
- Preceded by: Robert H. McCarter
- Succeeded by: John Wesley Wescott

Personal details
- Born: Edmund Wilson; December 15, 1863 Shrewsbury, New Jersey, U.S.
- Died: May 15, 1923 (aged 59) Red Bank, New Jersey, U.S.
- Party: Republican
- Spouse: Helen Kimball (m. 1892)
- Children: Edmund Wilson
- Education: Princeton University
- Occupation: Lawyer

Edmund Wilson Sr. (December 15, 1863 – May 15, 1923) was an American lawyer who served as the Attorney General of New Jersey from 1908 until 1914. He was the father of literary critic Edmund Wilson.

== Early life and education ==
Wilson was born in Shrewsbury, New Jersey in 1863 to Thaddeus and Charlotte Ann Wilson. He attended Phillips Exeter Academy and entered Princeton University in 1881. At Princeton he edited the student newspaper with his brother John. In his senior year, he led a rebellion against the faculty and was "rusticated" from the university, made to live in Kingston, New Jersey. He graduated in 1885 and studied law at Columbia Law School. After attaining his law degree he went into practice in Red Bank, New Jersey in the office of Henry M. Nevius. He entered into partnership with Nevius in 1898.

== Career ==
In 1903, Wilson was retained by the United States Attorney General William Henry Moody as special assistant in Justice Department cases against New Jersey bank officials in violation of the National Banking Act. He served on the State Board of Education, and in June 1907 was appointed to the State Board of Railroad Commissioners.

He resigned from the Railroad Commission when he was appointed Attorney General of New Jersey on November 17, 1908 by Republican Governor John Franklin Fort after the resignation of Robert H. McCarter. He was appointed for a full term in 1909 and continued to serve under Fort's Democratic successor, Woodrow Wilson (no relation to Edmund).

During Wilson's term as Attorney General, dozens of influential members of the Atlantic County Republican machine were prosecuted for corruption, including longtime Atlantic City boss Louis Kuehnle. The indictments were made using a little-known law allowing for "elisors" on grand juries to be drawn from outside the local district, thus avoiding the influence of the Atlantic County sheriff, suspected of hand-selecting grand jury lists.

Wilson married Helen Mather Kimball (April 20, 1865 – February 1951) in 1892. Their only child, Edmund Wilson Jr. (born May 8, 1895 in Red Bank), was a noted writer and literary critic. According to biographer Lewis M. Dabney, Edmund Jr. was influenced by his father's broad-minded social and political outlook. Dabney writes that Edward Sr., though a lifelong Republican, was "part of a genteel liberal tradition that was disappearing by the time his son was coming of age. He had a wide variety of friends unusual for an upper-middle-class WASP of his time, including blacks and Jews; on occasion he would even bring a Socialist friend home to dinner." Among Edward Sr.'s close friends was Sigmund Eisner (great-grandfather of Walt Disney CEO Michael Eisner), with whom he worked to improve the Red Bank school system.

In the spring of 1923, Wilson developed pneumonia in Talcottville, New York at an unheated stone house long owned by the Kimballs, his wife Helen's family. He died upon his return to Red Bank.

Legal offices
Preceded by Robert H. McCarter	Attorney General of New Jersey; 1908 – 1914	Succeeded by John W. Wescott
