= McArtor =

McArtor is a surname. Notable people with the surname include:

- Gene McArtor (1940/1941–2024), American baseball coach
- T. Allan McArtor (born 1942), Administrator of the U.S. Federal Aviation Administration

== See also ==
- McCarter
