= Henry M. Nevius =

American soldier, lawyer and politician (1841–1911)

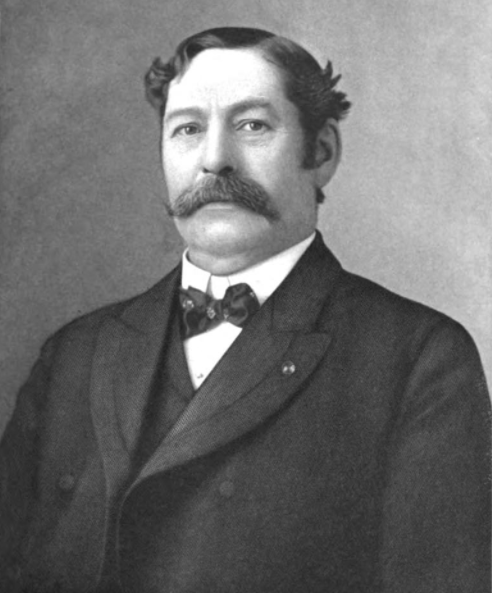
- Nevius in 1902 publication

Member of the New Jersey Senate
- In office 1887–1890

Personal details
- Born: Henry Martin Nevius; January 30, 1841 Freehold Township, New Jersey, U.S.
- Died: January 28, 1911 (aged 69) Red Bank, New Jersey, U.S.
- Resting place: Fair View Cemetery; Monmouth County, New Jersey, U.S.
- Party: Republican
- Spouse: Matilda Holmes Herbert (m. 1871)
- Children: 1
- Occupation: Soldier; lawyer; jurist; politician
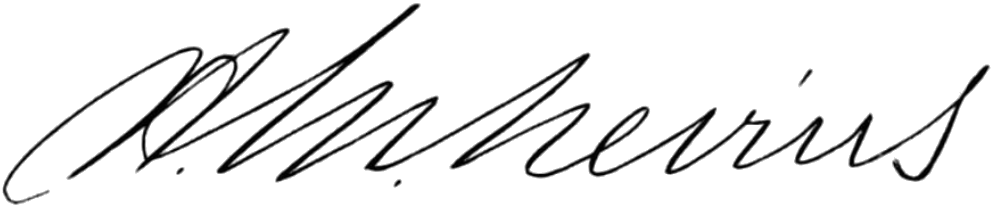
- Signature
- Military career
- Allegiance: United States
- Branch: Union Army
- Service years: 1861–1865
- Rank: Major
- Units: 1st New York Cavalry Regiment (1861–1862); 7th Michigan Cavalry Regiment (1862–1864); 25th New York Cavalry Regiment (1864–1865)
- Conflicts: American Civil War; Battle of Antietam; Early's raids of Washington, D.C.; Shenandoah Valley campaign; Battle of Gettysburg

Henry M. Nevius (January 30, 1841 – January 28, 1911) was an American officer in the Civil War, New Jersey state senator, lawyer and jurist.

== Early life ==
Henry Martin Nevius was born on January 30, 1841, in Freehold Township, New Jersey to Hannah (née Browne or Bowne) and James Schureman Nevius. He was educated at Freehold Public School and Institute, graduating from the Institute in 1858. In 1859, he moved to Grand Rapids, Michigan, and took post-graduate courses at Grand Rapids High School for two years.

== Career ==
Nevius joined the law office of future U.S. Secretary of War Russell A. Alger in Spring 1861. On August 12, 1861, Nevius enlisted as a private in Company K, 1st New York Cavalry Regiment ("Lincoln Cavalry") of the Union Army. He served as a Regimental Commissary Sergeant. On December 31, 1862, he was appointed as a second lieutenant to Company D, 7th Michigan Cavalry Regiment, under the command of George A. Custer. He resigned in 1864 to join a regiment out of Trenton, New Jersey, but the organization did not form. He instead re-enlisted in March 1864 as a private in Company D, 25th New York Cavalry Regiment ("Sickles Cavalry"). He was promoted for bravery to second lieutenant, and was later promoted to captain. On July 11, 1864, he commanded the center of a small band and led a charge during Early's raids near Fort Stevens in Washington, D.C. He was shot in his left arm, forcing amputation. President Abraham Lincoln promoted him to major. In May 1865, he was discharged. He was also present at the Battle of Antietam, Battle of Gettysburg and the Shenandoah Valley campaign.

In 1866, Nevius became a Deputy Collector of Internal Revenue for Monmouth County, New Jersey and then worked as an insurance agent in Marlboro. In 1868, he resumed studying law with General Charles Haight. He was admitted to the bar in Monmouth County in February 1873 and as a counselor in 1876. In 1875, he moved to Red Bank, New Jersey. He joined John Stilwell Applegate in a partnership from 1879 to 1880. In 1888, he formed Nevius & Wilson, a partnership with Edmund Wilson Sr. They remained partners until 1896. In 1896, Nevius was appointed by Governor Griggs as Judge of the Circuit Court of Hudson County. He remained in that role until 1903.

In 1881, Nevius helped organize and served as the commander of the Grand Army of the Republic chapter in Red Bank. He was elected Department Commander of the Grand Army of the Republic of New Jersey in 1884. In 1887, he was elected as a Republican to the New Jersey Senate. He remained in that role until 1890, and served as president of the Senate. In 1904, Nevius became Prosecutor of the Pleas for Monmouth County. He retired in October 1908 when he was elected the Commander-in-Chief of the Grand Army of the Republic, beating former Minnesota governor Samuel Van Sant. After serving one year as Commander-in-Chief, he returned to his private practice as a counselor-in-law and also worked in a chancery.

== Personal life and death ==
Nevius married Matilda Holmes Herbert on December 27, 1871. Together, they had a daughter, Kate. Nevius died on January 28, 1911, of a stroke at his home in Red Bank. He was interred at Fair View Cemetery in Monmouth County.
