= MJ Tyson =

American jewelry designer

- Born: 1986 (age 39–40); Morristown, New Jersey, U.S.
- Known for: Jewelry
- Website: mjtyson.com

MJ Tyson (born 1986) is an American jewelry designer.

She graduated in 2004 from the Pingry School. She received both her BFA and MFA from the Rhode Island School of Design (RISD). In 2018 she had a residency at the Studios at MASS MoCA. In 2020 she received the Art Jewelry Forum (AJF) Young Artist award. Her piece, Popular Devotion, was acquired by the Smithsonian American Art Museum as part of the Renwick Gallery's 50th Anniversary Campaign.
