= Pottersville, New Jersey =

Populated place in Hunterdon and Somerset counties, New Jersey, US

- Census-designated place
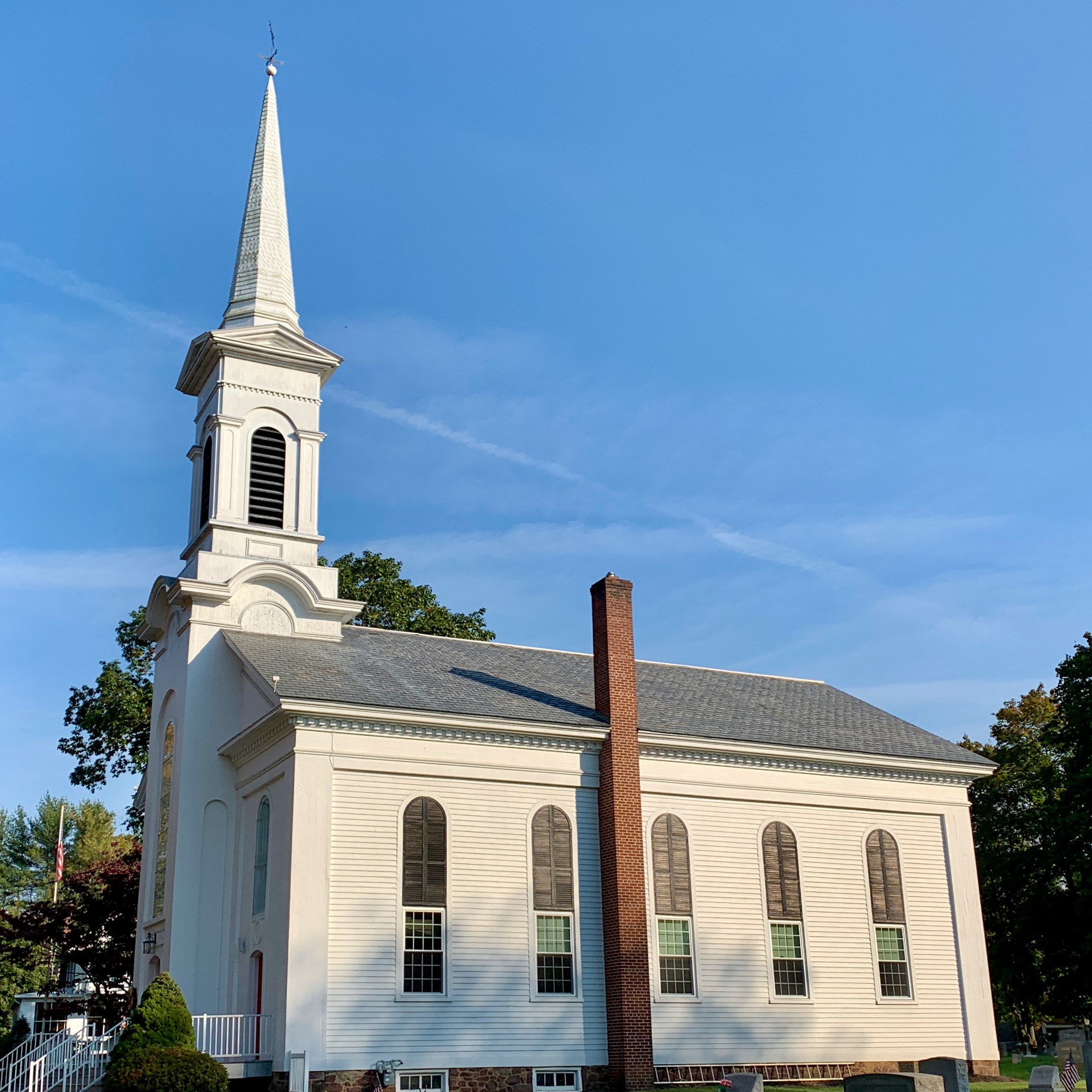
- Pottersville Reformed Church

- Location in Hunterdon County Location in Somerset County Location in New Jersey Location in the United States
- Coordinates: 40°42′49″N 74°43′19″W
- Country: United States
- State: New Jersey
- Counties: Hunterdon and Somerset
- Townships: Bedminster and Tewksbury

Area
  - Total: 0.92 sq mi (2.38 km^{2})
  - Land: 0.91 sq mi (2.36 km^{2})
  - Water: 0.0077 sq mi (0.02 km^{2})
- Elevation: 213 ft (65 m)

Population (2020)
  - Total: 467
  - Density: 511.8/sq mi (197.61/km^{2})
- Time zone: UTC−05:00 (Eastern (EST))
  - Summer (DST): UTC−04:00 (Eastern (EDT))
- FIPS code: 34-60750
- GNIS feature ID: 879465

Pottersville is an unincorporated community and census-designated place (CDP) split between Bedminster Township in Somerset County and Tewksbury Township in Hunterdon County, in the U.S. state of New Jersey. The area is served as United States Postal Service ZIP Code 07979. As of the 2020 census, Pottersville had a population of 467. In 1990, most of the village was listed on the National Register of Historic Places as the Pottersville Village Historic District.

== Demographics ==
Historical population
Census	Pop.	Note	%±
2020	467		—
U.S. Decennial Census; 2020

Pottersville was first listed as a census designated place in the 2020 U.S. census.

Pottersville CDP, New Jersey – Racial and ethnic composition Note: the US Census treats Hispanic/Latino as an ethnic category. This table excludes Latinos from the racial categories and assigns them to a separate category. Hispanics/Latinos may be of any race.
Race / Ethnicity (NH = Non-Hispanic)	Pop 2020	2020
White alone (NH)	406	86.94%
Black or African American alone (NH)	3	0.64%
Native American or Alaska Native alone (NH)	0	0.00%
Asian alone (NH)	20	4.28%
Native Hawaiian or Pacific Islander alone (NH)	0	0.00%
Other race alone (NH)	1	0.21%
Mixed race or Multiracial (NH)	17	3.64%
Hispanic or Latino (any race)	20	4.28%
Total	467	100.00%

As of the 2020 United States census, the population of the area was 467.

== Education ==
The Purnell School, a private all-girls boarding high school founded in 1963, was located in Pottersville. In February 2021, Purnell School announced that it would cease operations upon the completion of the 2020–2021 academic year. Later that year, Pingry School purchased the 82-acre campus to use as an extension of its existing campuses in Basking Ridge and Short Hills.

== History ==
Pottersville was first called Lamington and afterwards Potters Mills. There were mills here as early as 1756 built and owned by William Willet. One Mill still stands on the left side of County Route 512 heading towards Califon. It was originally used for weaving woolen goods and later turned into a grist mill. The first grist mill was built along the Lamington River (Black River), but no longer stands. A commemorative plaque has taken its place.

William Willet owned a day book in which he recorded sales to the Continental Army during the Revolutionary War. His main consideration became supplying the Continental Army. He was paid in Continental currency which around 1780 became worthless. He was ruined financially and was forced to sell both mills to Serrin Potter in 1783, which led to the community's name.

In 1887, upwards of 200,000 baskets of peaches were shipped from Pottersville and New Germantown (Oldwick) by wagons to Chester, Whitehouse and other area communities. The profitable peach growing industry led the Rockaway Valley Railroad to build a spur to Pottersville in 1888.

Black River Falls in Pottersville prompted the railroad to run excursions to the falls. The land around the glen were made into picnic grounds and an amusement park. There was a merry-go-round, dance pavilion and refreshment stand. Some visitors came from Jersey City, N.J. and usually stayed at the Pottersville Hotel. Failure of the peach crop eventually resulted in the end of the Rockaway Railroad. One town resident remembers the park open as late as 1920.

== Historic district ==
- Pottersville Village Historic District
- U.S. National Register of Historic Places
- U.S. Historic district
- New Jersey Register of Historic Places
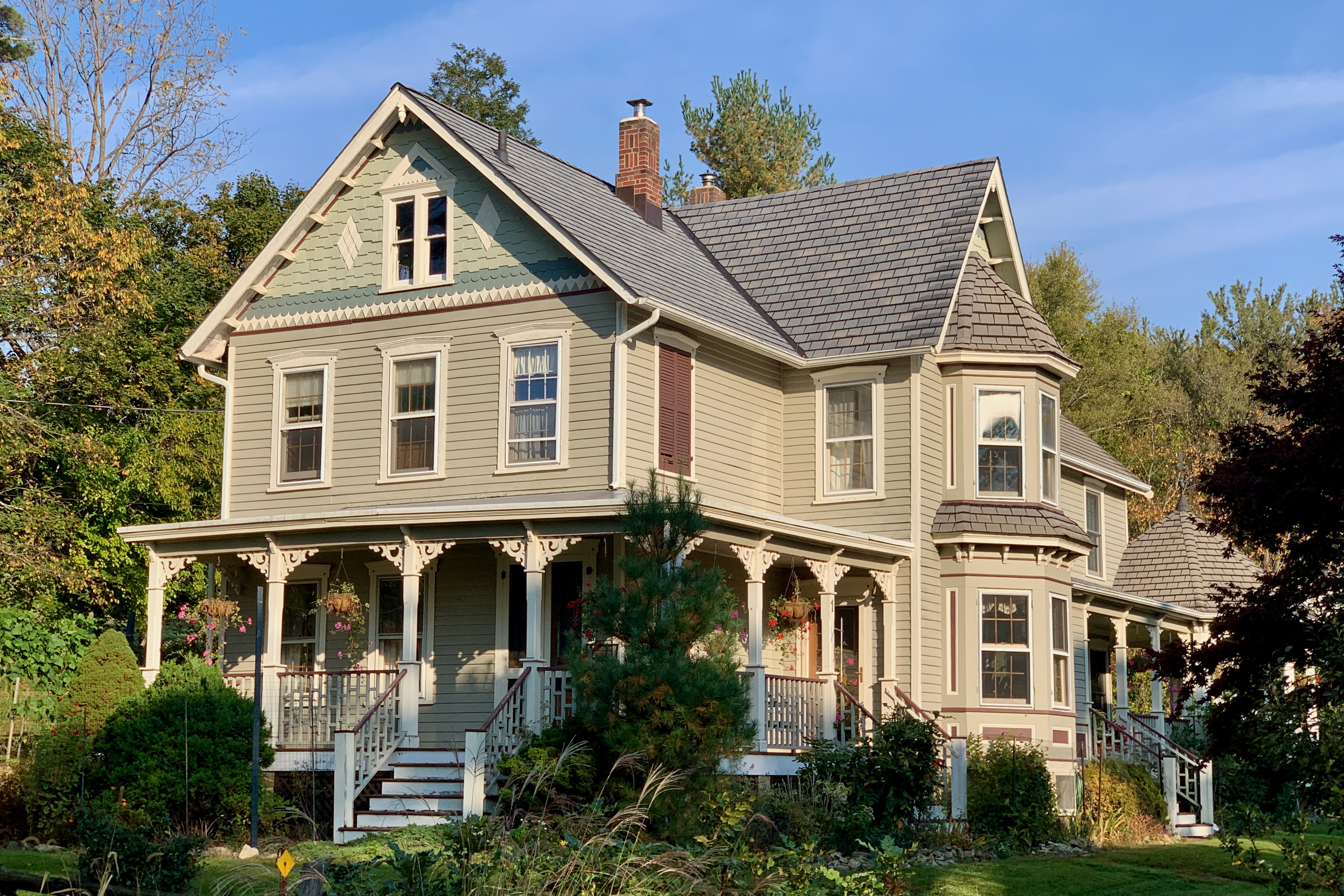
- Queen Anne style house
- Location: Properties fronting on Black River, Pottersville, McCann Mill and Hacklebarney Roads, Fairmount Road East and High Street
- Area: 85 acres (34 ha)
- Architectural style: Italianate, Queen Anne, Vernacular Victorian
- NRHP reference No.: 90001475
- NJRHP No.: 1633

Significant dates
- Added to NRHP: September 18, 1990
- Designated NJRHP: August 9, 1990

The Pottersville Village Historic District is a historic district encompassing the village. The district was added to the National Register of Historic Places on September 18, 1990, for its significance in industry, commerce, architecture, settlement, and archeology from 1750 to 1924. It includes 44 contributing buildings, 4 contributing sites and 2 contributing structures.

== Gallery ==
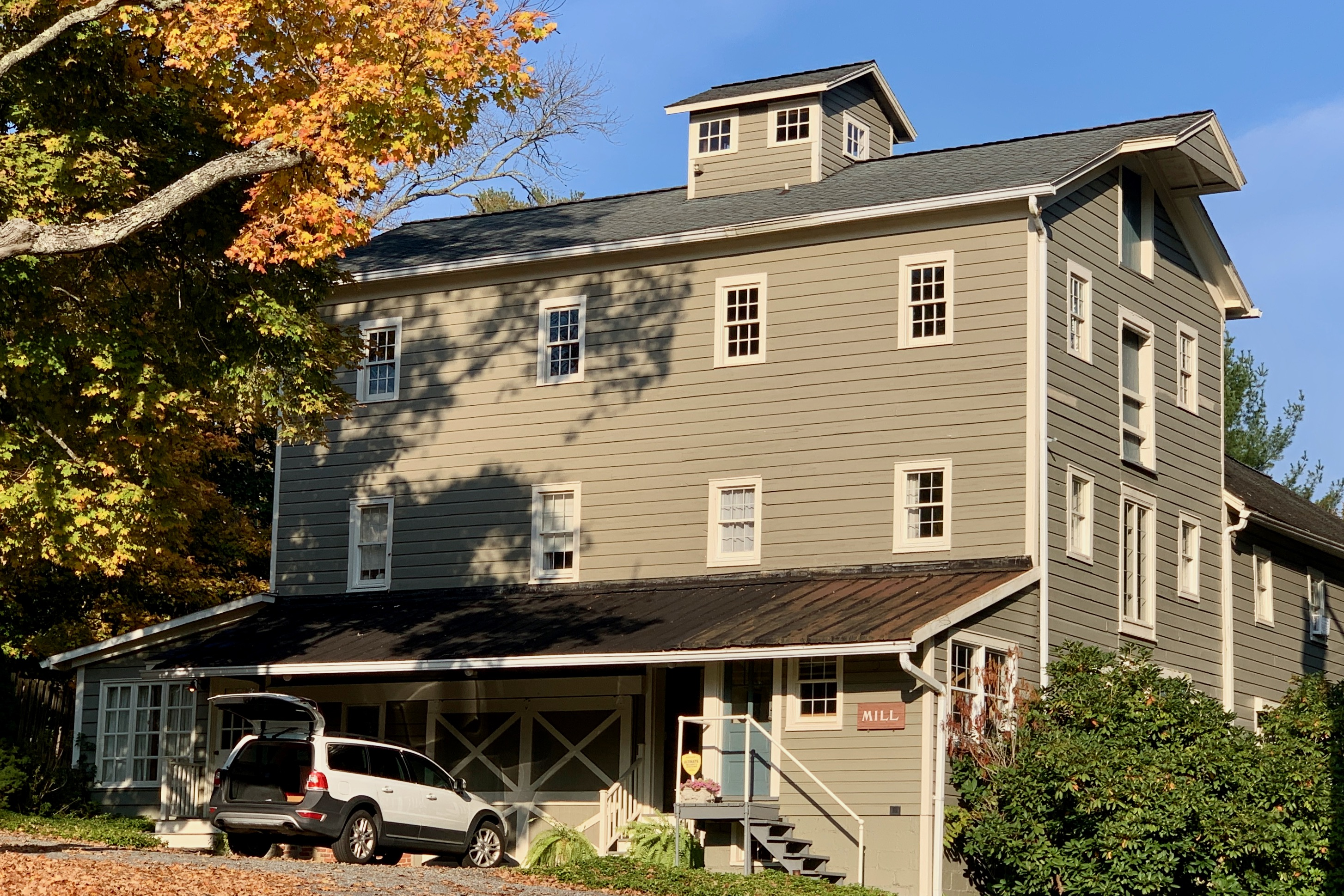
Upper Mill, now a residence

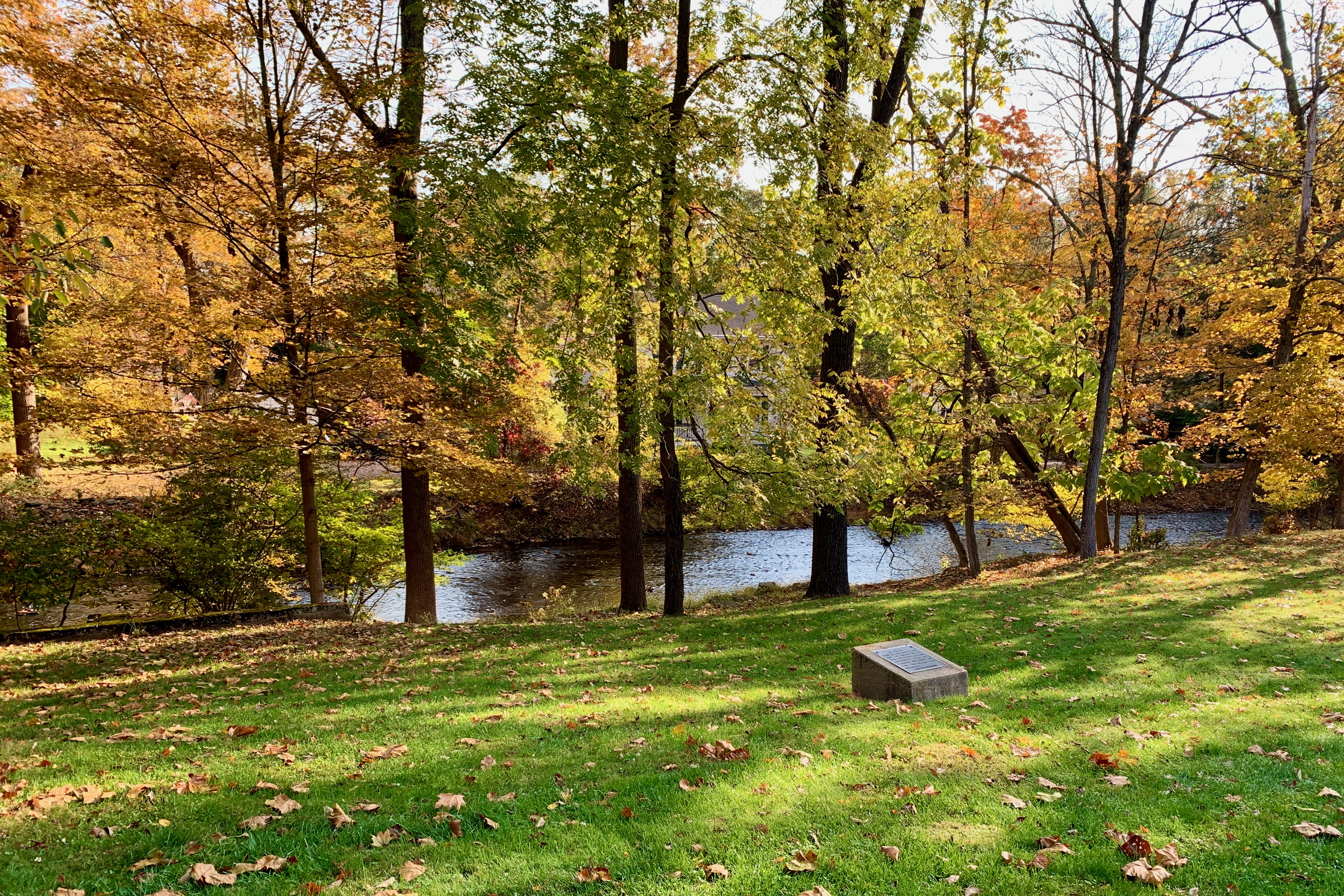
Lower Mill site, with commemorative plaque

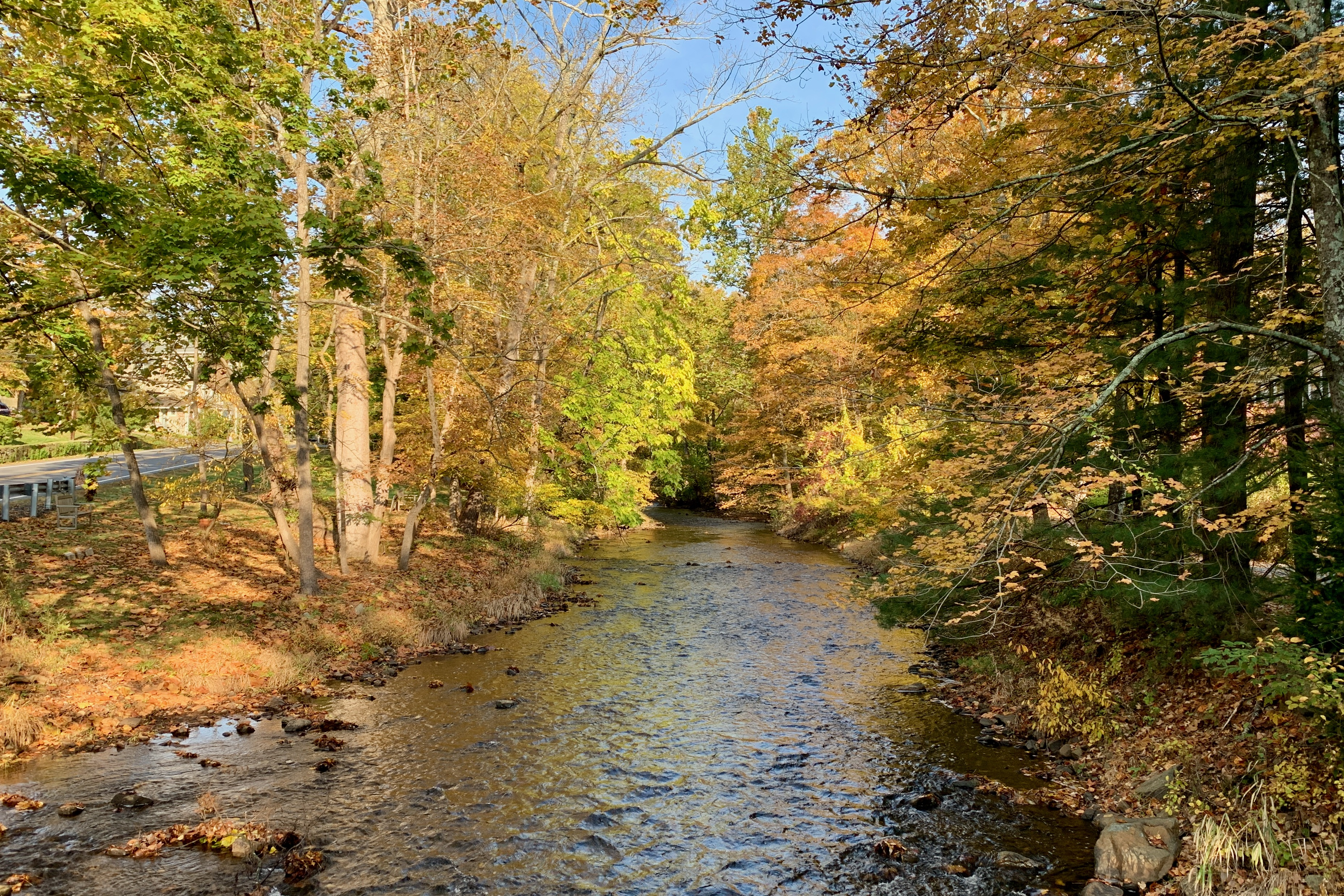
Lamington River by Lower Mill site

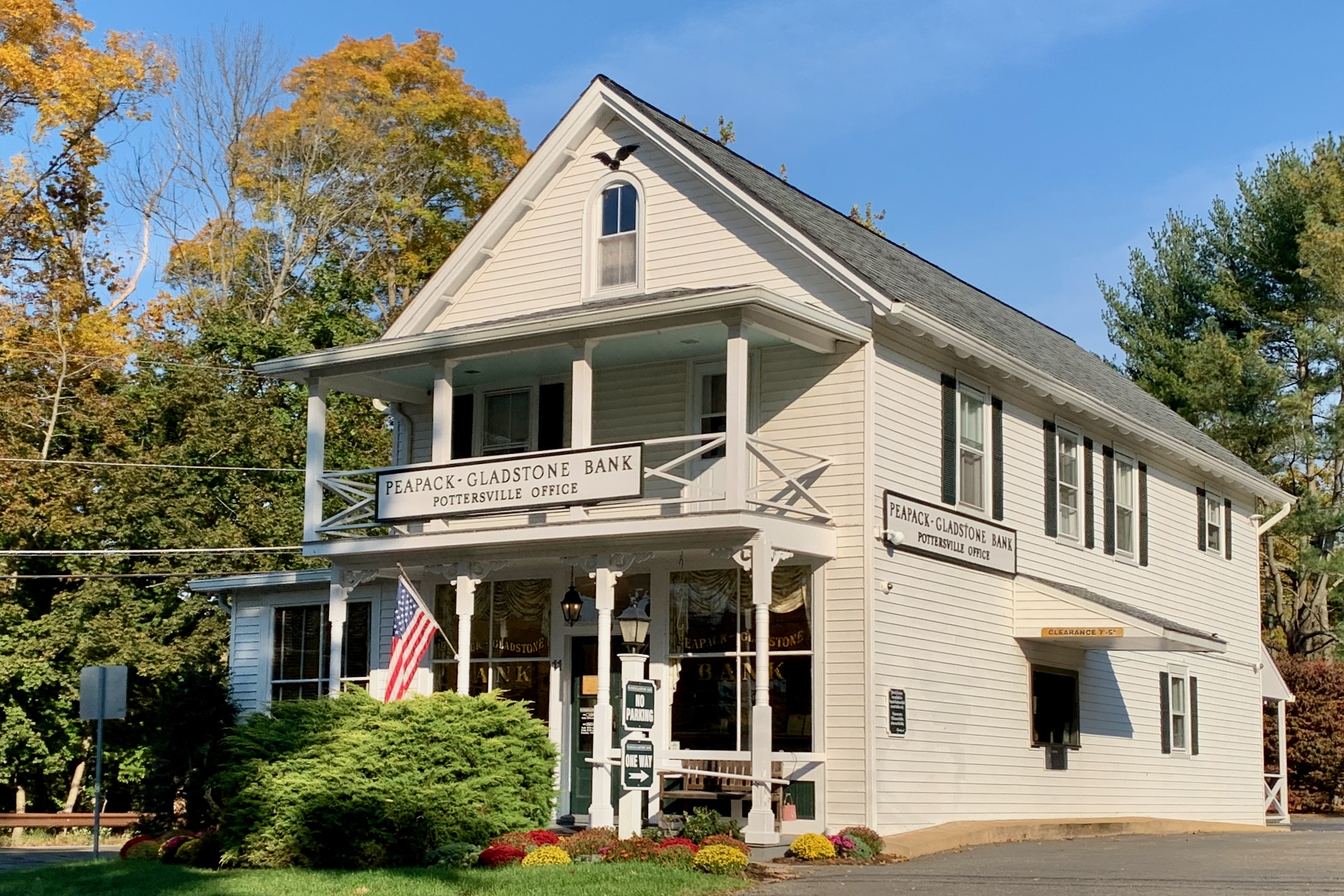
Former Pottersville Store and Post Office

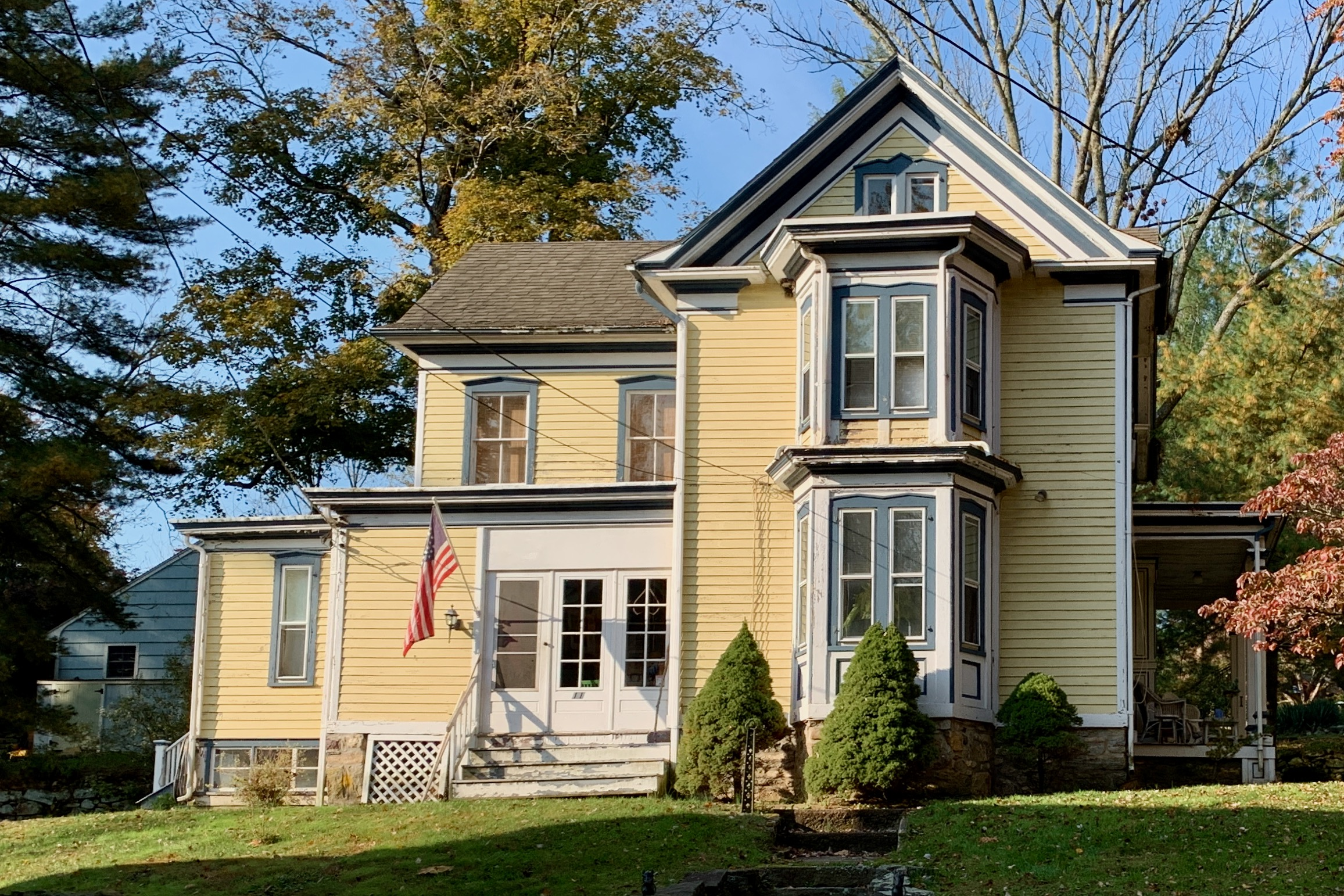
Italianate style house

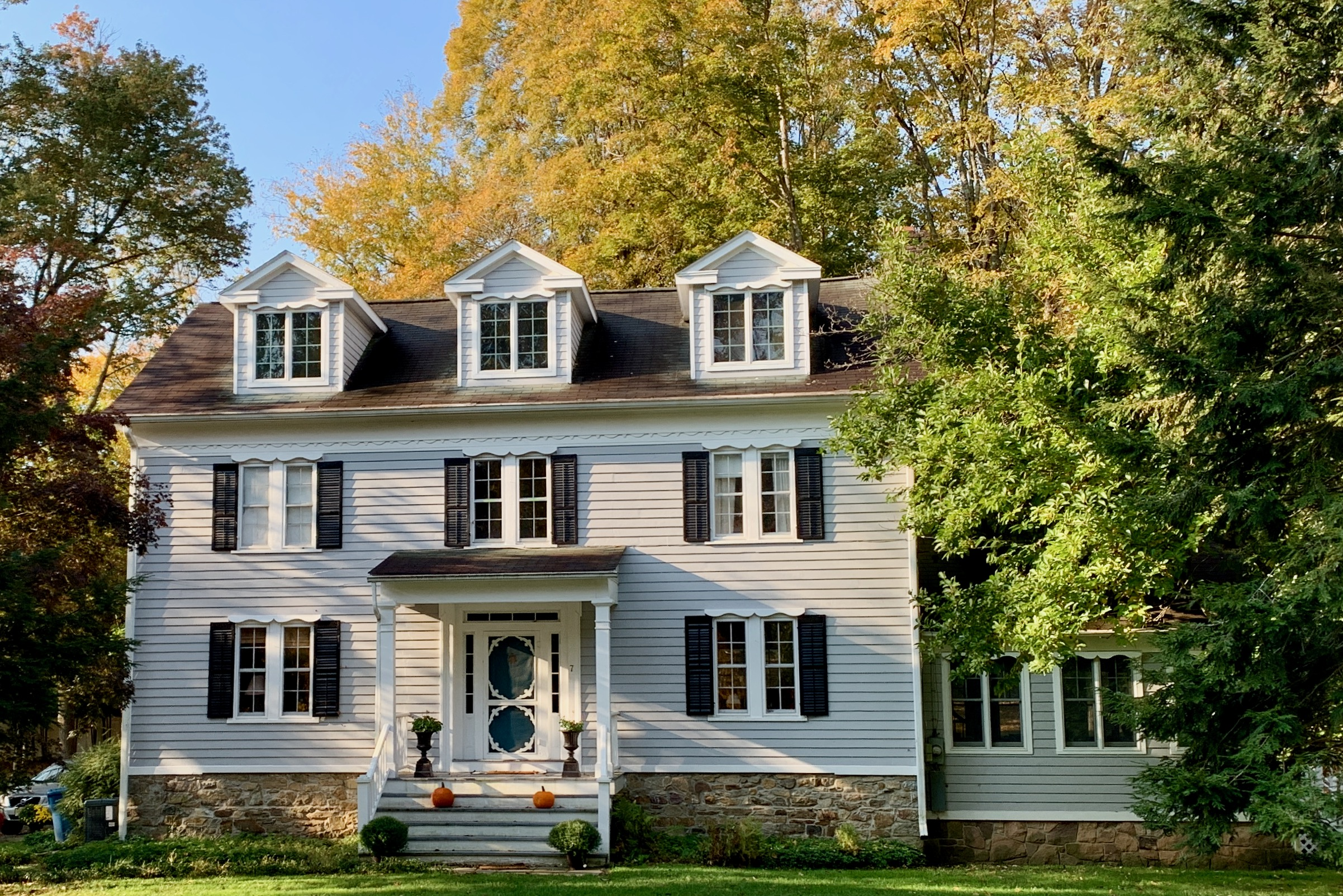
Federal style house

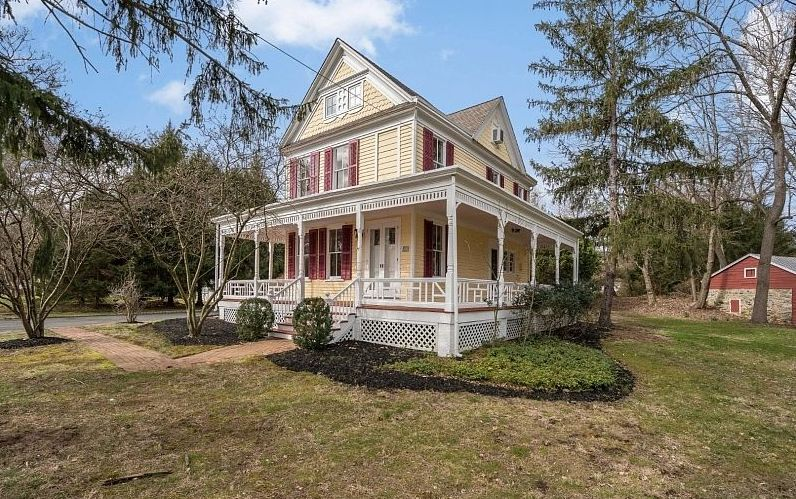
Victorian Style House

== Notable people ==
People who were born in, residents of, or otherwise closely associated with Pottersville include:

- Harriet Adams (1893–1982), author of some 200 books, including nearly 50 in the Nancy Drew series.

== See also ==
- National Register of Historic Places listings in Hunterdon County, New Jersey
- National Register of Historic Places listings in Morris County, New Jersey
- National Register of Historic Places listings in Somerset County, New Jersey
