= John F. Pingry =

American minister and educator (1818–1894)

The Reverend John F. Pingry
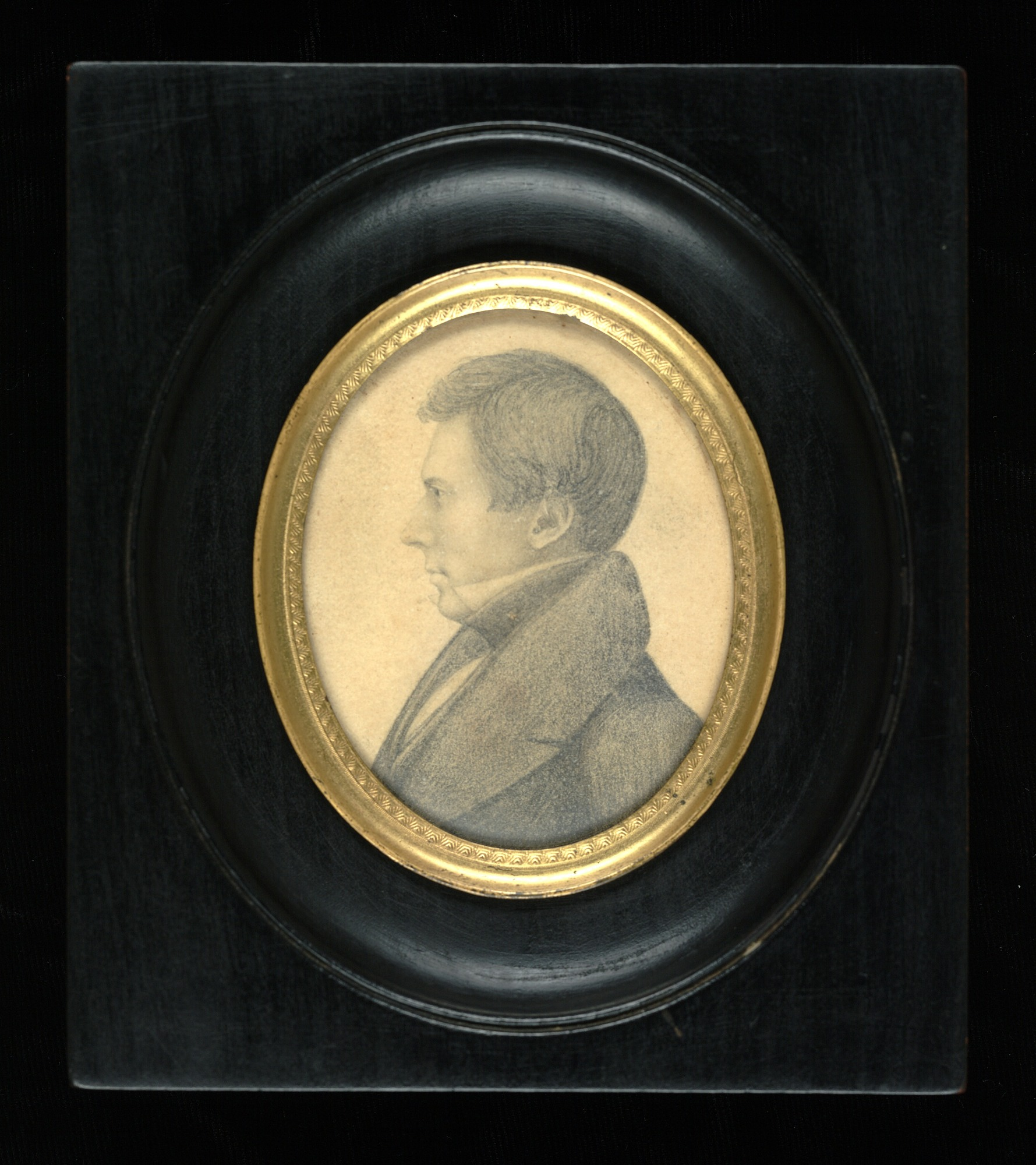
- Portrait c. 1830s

Personal life
- Born: September 26, 1818 Newburyport, Massachusetts
- Died: February 16, 1894 (aged 75) Elizabeth, New Jersey
- Spouse: Caroline G. Oakley
- Main interest: Pedagogy
- Notable work: The Pingry School (est. 1861)
- Education: Dartmouth College (BA); Union Theological Seminary (DD)
- Occupation: Minister; educator

Religious life
- Religion: Christianity
- Church: Presbyterian Church

John Francis Pingry (September 26, 1818 – February 16, 1893) was an American Presbyterian minister and educator. He founded The Pingry School in 1861.

== Life and career ==
Pingry was born in Newburyport, Massachusetts, near Haverhill. At age 14, he entered Dartmouth College to study to become a minister, graduating in 1836. That year, he moved to Elizabeth, New Jersey. Pingry worked at Chilton Seminary as an assistant to Rev. John T Halsey and later married Halsey's sister, Caroline G. Oakley.

Between 1840-1841, Pingry attended Union Theological Seminary in Manhattan. He was ordained at the Presbyterian Church in Fishkill, New York in 1842 and served as its minister for four years. There, Pingry first began a classical school for boys in Fishkill, which he later relocated to Roseville outside of Newark, New Jersey. In 1860, he became principal of Chilton Seminary, renamed Elizabeth's Pearl Cottage Seminary, located at 1186 East Grand Street.

After 25 years of being a teacher and minister, he opened the 'Pingry Select School for Boys' in Elizabeth, New Jersey in 1861, limited to one hundred pupils. As its motto, he wrote Maxima reverentia pueris debetur (Great respect is due students). He took in students like Leander Tallmadge and the Rev. John Bancroft Devins, whom he generously allowed to "earn his tuition and... school books by janitor and other service."

In 1953, the school was relocated a short distance to Hillside, New Jersey, and then Martinsville, New Jersey in 1983, where it continues operating as a private college-preparatory country day school.
