= Thomas N. McCarter (1824–1901) =

American politician and lawyer (1824–1901)

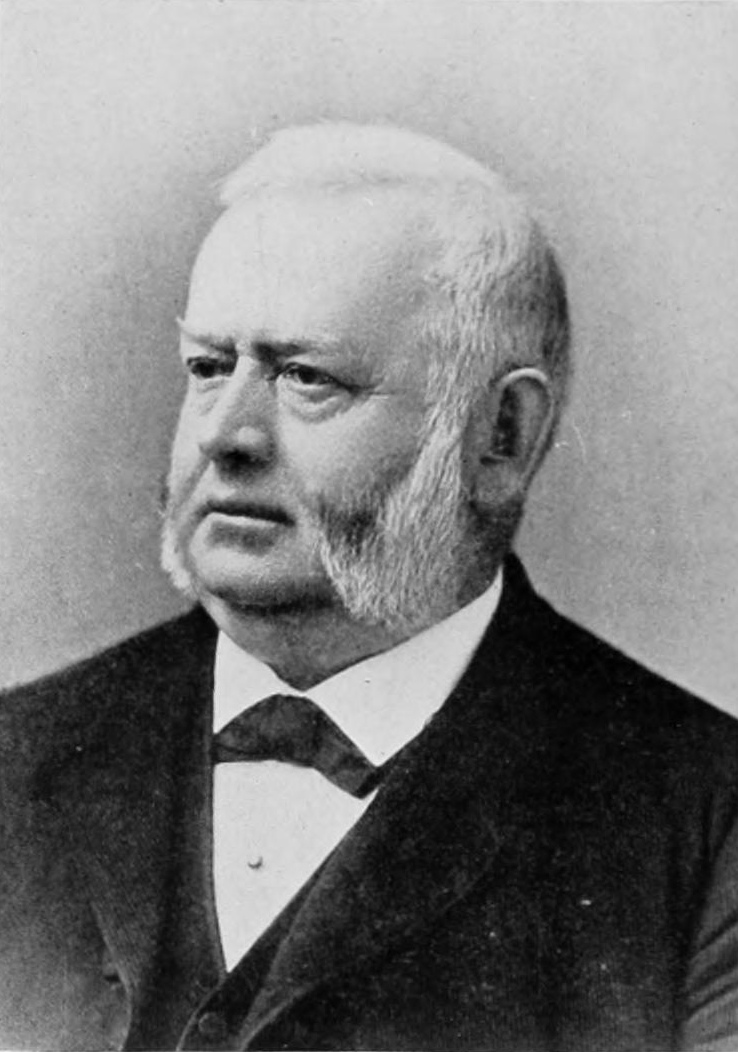
- McCarter in an 1899 publication

Member of the New Jersey General Assembly
- In office 1862–1862 Serving with William H. Bell
- Constituency: Sussex County

Personal details
- Born: January 31, 1824; Morristown, New Jersey, U.S.
- Died: January 11, 1901 (aged 76); Newark, New Jersey, U.S.
- Political party: Democratic (1862 and before); Republican (after Civil War)
- Spouse: Mary Louise Haggerty (m. 1849; died 1896)
- Children: 6, including Thomas Jr. and Robert
- Education: Princeton University
- Occupation: Politician; lawyer

Thomas Nesbitt McCarter (January 31, 1824 – January 11, 1901) was an American politician and lawyer from New Jersey.

== Early life ==
Thomas Nesbitt McCarter was born on January 31, 1824, in Morristown, New Jersey, to Thomas N. McCarter. His father was a judge of the court of common pleas in Sussex County, New Jersey. He graduated from Princeton University in 1842. He was admitted to the bar in 1845.

== Career ==
In 1854, McCarter dissolved his law practice with Martin Ryerson to serve as collector of Sussex County. In 1860, he declined a supreme court appointment by Governor Charles Smith Olden and in 1866, he declined a similar nomination by Governor Marcus Lawrence Ward.

Prior to the Civil War, McCarter was a Democrat. In 1861, he was elected as a Democrat to represent Sussex County in the New Jersey General Assembly. He was chairman of the ways and means committee. He was a member of the executive committee of the Anti-Race Track League and opposed the licensing of race tracks. He also opposed open saloons on Sunday. He declined renomination. In 1860, he was a presidential elector for Stephen A. Douglas. Following the Civil War, he became associated with the Republican Party. He supported the election of Abraham Lincoln in 1864 and was a presidential elector for Rutherford B. Hayes in 1876.

McCarter practiced commercial law in Newton until 1865. In 1865, he moved to Newark. From 1868 to 1882, he had a law partnership with Oscar Keen. He formed the law firm McCarter, Williamson & McCarter in 1882 and served as a senior member. He was counsel for the Leigh Valley Railroad, Morris Canal and Banking Company, and East Jersey Water Company.

McCarter was trustee of the Evelyn College for Women. He was vice president of the Scotch-Irish Society of America and the Princeton Club of New York.

== Personal life ==
McCarter married Mary Louise Haggerty in 1849. They had three sons and three daughters, Thomas N. Jr., Uzal H., Robert H., Mrs. Carter H. Baylis, Mrs. E. B. Williamson, and Eliza. His son Thomas served as a state senator in New Jersey. His wife died in 1896. He lived on Broad Street in Newark. In the summers, he lived in Sea Bright, New Jersey.

McCarter died of heart failure on January 11, 1901, at his home in Newark.

== Awards ==
McCarter received an honorary Doctor of Laws from Princeton University in 1875. He was an honorary incorporator of the Dickinson School of Law.
