= John Stilwell Applegate =

American lawyer, politician and writer (1837–1916)

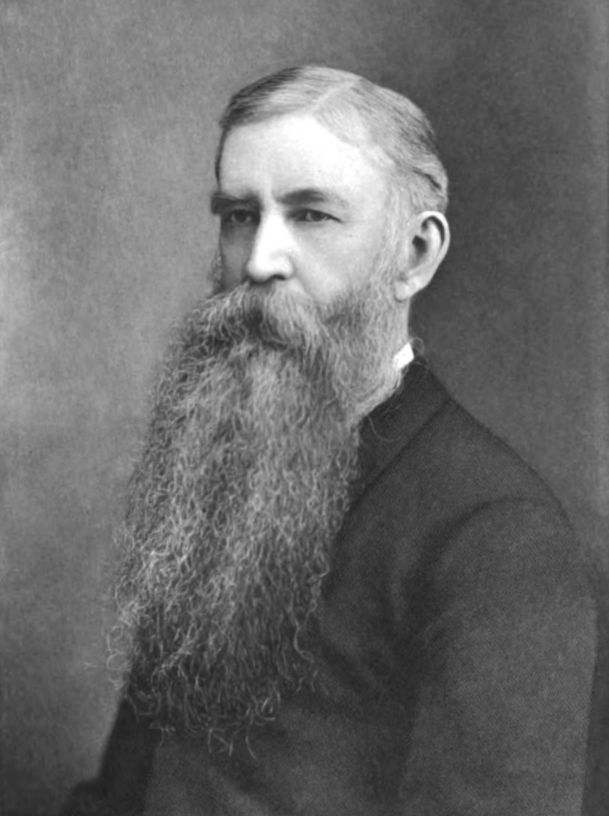

Member of the New Jersey Senate
- In office 1882–1884

Personal details
- Born: August 6, 1837 Middletown Township, New Jersey, U.S.
- Died: November 10, 1916 (aged 79) Red Bank, New Jersey, U.S.
- Resting place: Fair View Cemetery; Middletown Township, New Jersey, U.S.
- Party: Republican
- Spouse: Deborah Catharine Allen (m. 1865)
- Children: 3
- Education: Colgate University
- Occupation: Lawyer; politician; writer
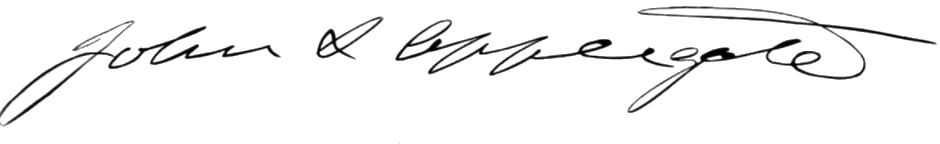
- Signature

John Stilwell Applegate (August 6, 1837 – November 10, 1916) was an American politician, lawyer and writer. He served in the New Jersey Senate, representing Monmouth County. He also served as the chief commissioner (mayor) of Red Bank, New Jersey.

== Early life ==
John Stilwell Applegate was born on August 6, 1837, on the family farm at Nutswamp, Middletown Township, New Jersey, to Ann (née Gray) and Joseph Stilwell Applegate. His father was a farmer and a store owner. Applegate attended the district school at Nutswamp. He graduated Colgate University in 1858. He studied law in Red Bank, New Jersey with Robert Allen Jr. He then studied with William L. Dayton in Trenton and then with E. B. Wakeman. He was admitted to the bar in New Jersey in 1861.

== Career ==
Applegate began practicing law in Red Bank, New Jersey. He then became a counselor of law in February 1865. In 1875, he formed a law practice with Henry M. Nevius. He remained with the practice until 1880. In 1884, Applegate partnered with Frederick W. Hope in a law practice. They remained partners until 1901. He later formed a firm with his son, John Stilwell Applegate Jr. He stayed with their practice, John S. Applegate & Son, until his death.

During the American Civil War, Applegate was commissioned as a special deputy of the Union League for Monmouth County. In 1862, he was elected as a Republican as the school superintendent of Shrewsbury Township, and was elected three more times. He served as president of the first building and loan association of the shore section of Monmouth County from 1871 to 1875. In 1872, Applegate became president of the Red Bank Gas Light Company. In 1875, he started a movement that would lead to the founding of the Second National Bank of Red Bank. He would serve as its first president until 1887. He remained a member of the board of directors of the bank until his death.

Applegate was involved in local politics and was part of the first municipal council of Red Bank after it was incorporated as a town in 1871. He was elected assistant commissioner in 1872 and was elected the chief commissioner (mayor) of Red Bank in 1873. He retired the following year and was replaced by James S. Throckmorton. In 1881, Applegate was elected as a Republican to the New Jersey Senate, representing Monmouth County. He defeated George Washington Patterson. A notable bill he helped pass was to contract out to the lowest bidder the public printing of the state. He remained in that role until 1884. He also drafted a bill allowing smaller towns and villages in New Jersey to construct and maintain their own water works. Following this act, in 1884, he became a member of the first board of water commissioners of Red Bank. He remained in that role until Red Bank changed from a town to a borough in 1900.

Applegate also served as president of New York & Atlantic Highlands Railroad Company. He served as president until its consolidation with the Central Railroad system. In 1893, Applegate published a memorial volume of George Arrowsmith, lieutenant colonel of the 157th New York Infantry Regiment, entitled The Life and Service of George Arrowsmith. He also wrote Early Courts and Lawyers of Monmouth County (1911).

== Personal life and death ==
Applegate married Deborah Catharine Allen of Red Bank, daughter of Charles Gordon Allen, in 1865. Together, they had three children: Annie, Katharine and John Stilwell Applegate Jr.

Applegate died on November 10, 1916, at his home in Red Bank. He was buried at the family plot at Fair View Cemetery in Middletown.

== Awards ==
Applegate received an honorary Bachelor of Laws degree from Colgate University in 1904.
