= Robert H. McCarter =

American lawyer (1859–1941)

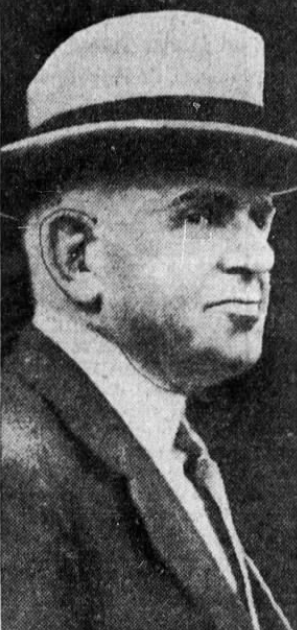
- McCarter (c. 1927)

24th Attorney General of New Jersey
- In office 1903–1908
- Governor: Franklin Murphy; Edward C. Stokes
- Preceded by: Thomas N. McCarter
- Succeeded by: Edmund Wilson Sr.

Personal details
- Born: Robert Harris McCarter; April 28, 1859 Newton, New Jersey, U.S.
- Died: May 30, 1941 (aged 82) Rumson, New Jersey, U.S.
- Party: Republican
- Parent: Thomas N. McCarter (father)
- Relatives: Thomas N. McCarter (brother)
- Education: Princeton University; Columbia Law School
- Occupation: Lawyer

Robert Harris McCarter (April 28, 1859 – May 30, 1941) was an American lawyer who served as the Attorney General of New Jersey from 1903 until 1908, succeeding his brother Thomas N. McCarter.

McCarter was born in Newton, New Jersey, in 1859 to Thomas Nesbitt and Mary Louisa (Haggerty) McCarter. He attended the Pingry School and Newark Academy before entering Princeton University, where he graduated in 1879. He studied at Columbia Law School, receiving his diploma in 1882, and was admitted to the New Jersey bar that same year.

McCarter and his brother joined the law firm of their father, which had been established in Newton in 1845 and moved to Newark twenty years later. The firm was known as McCarter & Keen until the two younger McCarters, along with their brother-in-law Edwin B. Williamson, became partners, after which time it was known as McCarter, Williamson & McCarter.

McCarter's brother Thomas served Attorney General of New Jersey from 1902 to 1903, resigning to become president of the Public Service Corporation of New Jersey. Governor Franklin Murphy nominated McCarter to take his brother's spot, and he was confirmed as Attorney General on May 5, 1903. He served for a term of five years.

After his tenure as Attorney General, he returned to his Newark law practice, which became known as McCarter & English in 1906 after the death of Edwin B. Williamson and the promotion of Conover English to partner. Though he mostly took on corporate clients, he served as the defense attorney for one of New Jersey's most sensational criminal cases, the Hall-Mills Murder trial of 1926. Edward Wheeler Hall, a New Brunswick Episcopal priest, and Eleanor Reinhardt Mills, had been murdered, and McCarter defended the priest's wife and her brothers at trial. He managed to win acquittals for all three defendants.

McCarter served as president of the New Jersey State Bar Association. He was counsel to Lester H. Clee in his 1937 campaign for Governor of New Jersey against A. Harry Moore. In 1938, he served as counsel for a committee investigating election irregularities in Hudson County at a time when political boss Frank Hague held a tight grip on the county's electoral process.

McCarter died of a heart attack on May 30, 1941, at his home in Rumson at the age of 82.

Legal offices
| Preceded by Thomas N. McCarter | Attorney General of New Jersey; 1903 – 1908 | Succeeded by Edmund Wilson |
