= Thomas N. McCarter =

American politician (1867–1955)

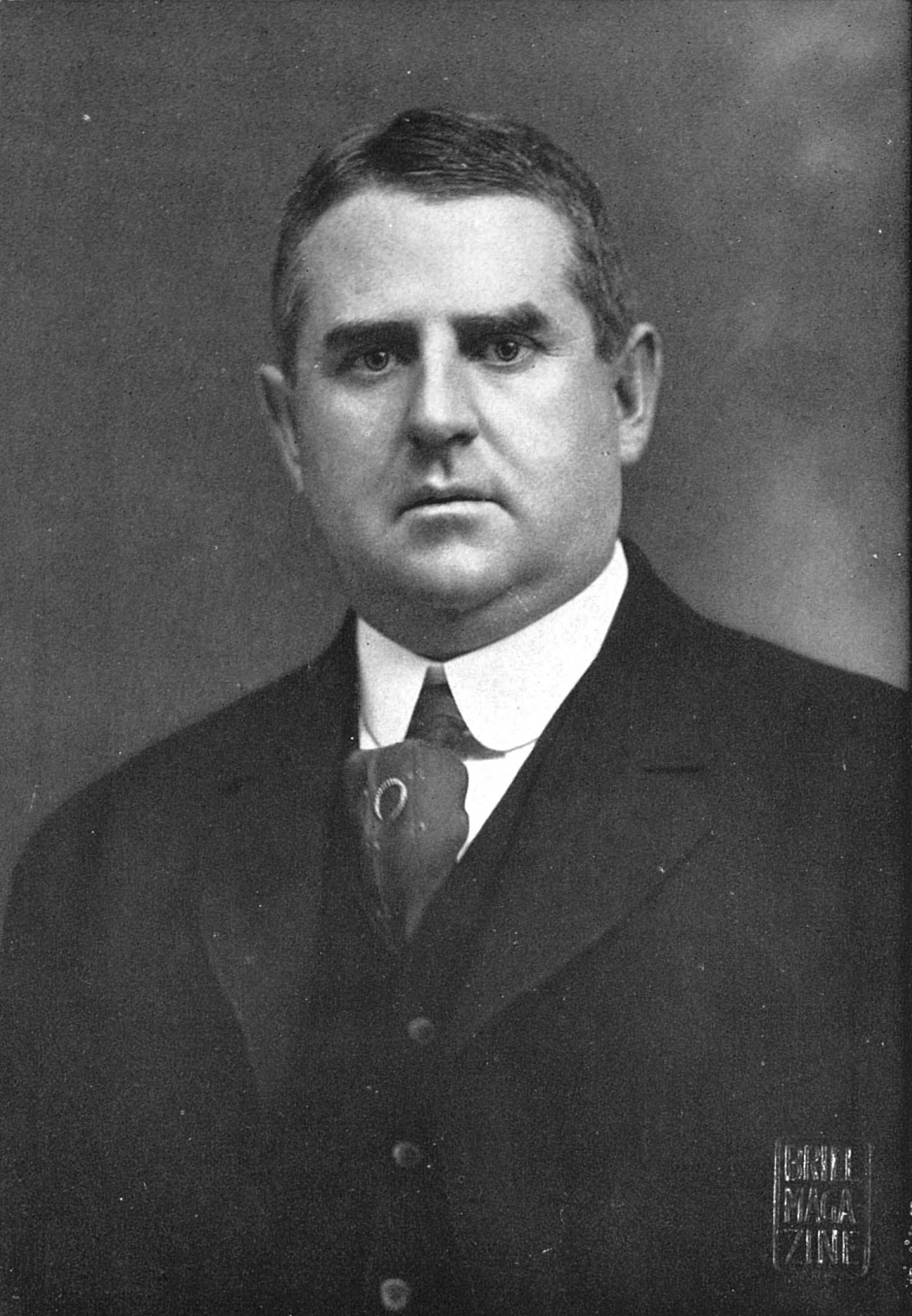

23rd Attorney General of New Jersey
- In office 1902–1903
- Governor: Franklin Murphy
- Preceded by: Samuel H. Grey
- Succeeded by: Robert H. McCarter

Member of the New Jersey Senate from Essex County
- In office 1900–1902
- Preceded by: George W. Ketcham
- Succeeded by: J. Henry Bacheller

Personal details
- Born: October 20, 1867 Newark, New Jersey
- Died: October 23, 1955 (aged 88) Rumson, New Jersey
- Party: Republican
- Parent: Thomas N. McCarter (father)
- Relatives: Robert H. McCarter (brother)
- Education: Newark Academy; Pingry School
- Alma mater: Princeton University; Columbia Law School

Thomas Nesbitt McCarter (October 20, 1867 – October 23, 1955) was an American lawyer who served as the Attorney General of New Jersey from 1902 until 1903, resigning to organize the Public Service Corporation of New Jersey. He served as its president for 36 years, as it became one of the biggest public utilities companies in the United States.

== Early life and education ==
McCarter was born in Newark, New Jersey in 1867 to Thomas Nesbitt and Mary Louisa (Haggerty) McCarter. After attending the Newark Academy and Pingry School, he entered Princeton University, graduating in 1888. He played doubles tennis in the Montclair Open in 1886.

McCarter studied law at Columbia Law School. He started practice with his father's law firm, McCarter & Keen, founded in 1845 in Newark, New Jersey.

== Marriage and family ==
After starting work with his brother and brother-in-law, McCarter married and had several children, including Thomas N. McCarter, Jr.; and Ellen McCarter, who married Nelson Doubleday. He became president of the publishing firm his father founded.

== Career ==
McCarter and his brother Robert, along with their brother-in-law Edwin B. Williamson, renamed their law firm in 1891 as McCarter, Williamson & McCarter (later it was known as McCarter & English).

In 1896 McCarter was appointed judge of the First District Court in Newark, resigning in 1899. That year he was elected to the New Jersey Senate, where he served as majority leader.

Also in 1899 he began his own practice, founding the firm of McCarter & Adams with Edwin G. Adams. He ended his partnership with Adams in 1902 to serve as general counsel for the Fidelity Trust Company of Newark.

Later in 1902 he was nominated by Governor Franklin Murphy as Attorney General of New Jersey and was immediately confirmed. McCarter served only one year of his five-year term before resigning in 1903. He had been appointed to organize the Public Service Corporation of New Jersey, which would become one the nation's largest public utilities. Governor Murphy appointed his brother, Robert H. McCarter, to succeed him as Attorney General.

McCarter became the first president of the Public Service Corporation; he served in that position for 36 years, resigning in 1945 on his 78th birthday. Under his guidance, the corporation expanded its control from trolley lines to the management of the state's gas, electric and transportation facilities. In 1948 it was renamed the Public Service Electric and Gas Company.

McCarter died in 1955 at his home in Rumson at the age of 88. He was interred in the McCarter mausoleum in the cemetery located along Rumson Road in Rumson, NJ. His wife, Madeleine Barker McCarter, is also interred in this mausoleum.

== Legacy and honors ==
- McCarter Theatre at Princeton University was named in his honor; he was a major benefactor for the new project.
- McCarter Highway was named for him; it is a major artery that runs from Downtown Newark to Belleville.
- Nesbitt St. in Newark is named for him.
- The field by Viola L. Sickles Elementary in Fair Haven is named McCarter Park. At the Intersection of Willow St. and Fair Haven Rd. is a brick gate that reads Rumson Hill. It marks the entrance to McCarter's estate, the path of which traces Buttonwood Lane in Fair Haven and Sycamore Lane in Rumson. Both streets are bordered with buttonwood trees. The Buttonwood Lane portion also passes a pond on Fair Haven Rd. called McCarter pond, which was installed for ornamental use and is used for fishing and skating.

Legal offices
Preceded by Samuel H. Grey	Attorney General of New Jersey; 1902 – 1903	Succeeded by Robert H. McCarter
