= McCarter & English =

- Headquarters: Newark, New Jersey
- No. of offices: 12
- No. of attorneys: approximately 400
- Major practice areas: General practice
- Key people: Joseph Lubertazzi, Jr., chairman, Joseph T. Boccassini, firmwide managing partner
- Date founded: 1845
- Company type: Limited liability partnership

McCarter & English, LLP, is an American full-service law firm headquartered in Newark, New Jersey. Founded in 1845, it is one of the oldest law firms in the United States. Besides its Newark headquarters, the firm has offices across the United States in Boston, East Brunswick, Hartford, Indianapolis, Miami, New York City, Philadelphia, Stamford, Wilmington, and Washington, D.C.

== Practice profile ==
The firm's clients include Fortune 100, mid-cap, closely held, and emerging companies, and include financial, industrial, pharmaceutical, and commercial enterprises as well as educational, health care, government, and nonprofit institutions.

In February 2014, McCarter acquired the Washington, DC–based energy law firm Miller, Balis & O’Neil.

== Offices ==
- Boston
- East Brunswick
- Hartford
- Indianapolis
- Miami
- New York
- Newark
- Philadelphia
- Trenton
- Stamford
- Wilmington
- Washington, D.C.

== Notable alumni ==
- Robert H. McCarter, former New Jersey Attorney General (1903–1908)
- Thomas N. McCarter, former New Jersey Attorney General (1902–1903)
