= Science project =

Educational activity for students

A science project is an educational activity for students involving experiments or construction of models in one of the science disciplines. Students may present their science project at a science fair, so they may also call it a science fair project. Science projects may be classified into four main types. Science projects are done by students worldwide.

== Experimental projects ==
Science class X Experimental projects, also known as investigatory projects, start with a question (AKA a hypothesis), use the scientific method to complete the research, and end with a report detailing the results and conclusions and an abstract.

== Engineering projects ==
Engineering projects, also known as technology projects, start with a design of a machine or mechanical structure with the purpose of improving strength or performance. Researchers implement all their design ideas in a model they construct. The model will be tested to evaluate the design.

== Display projects ==
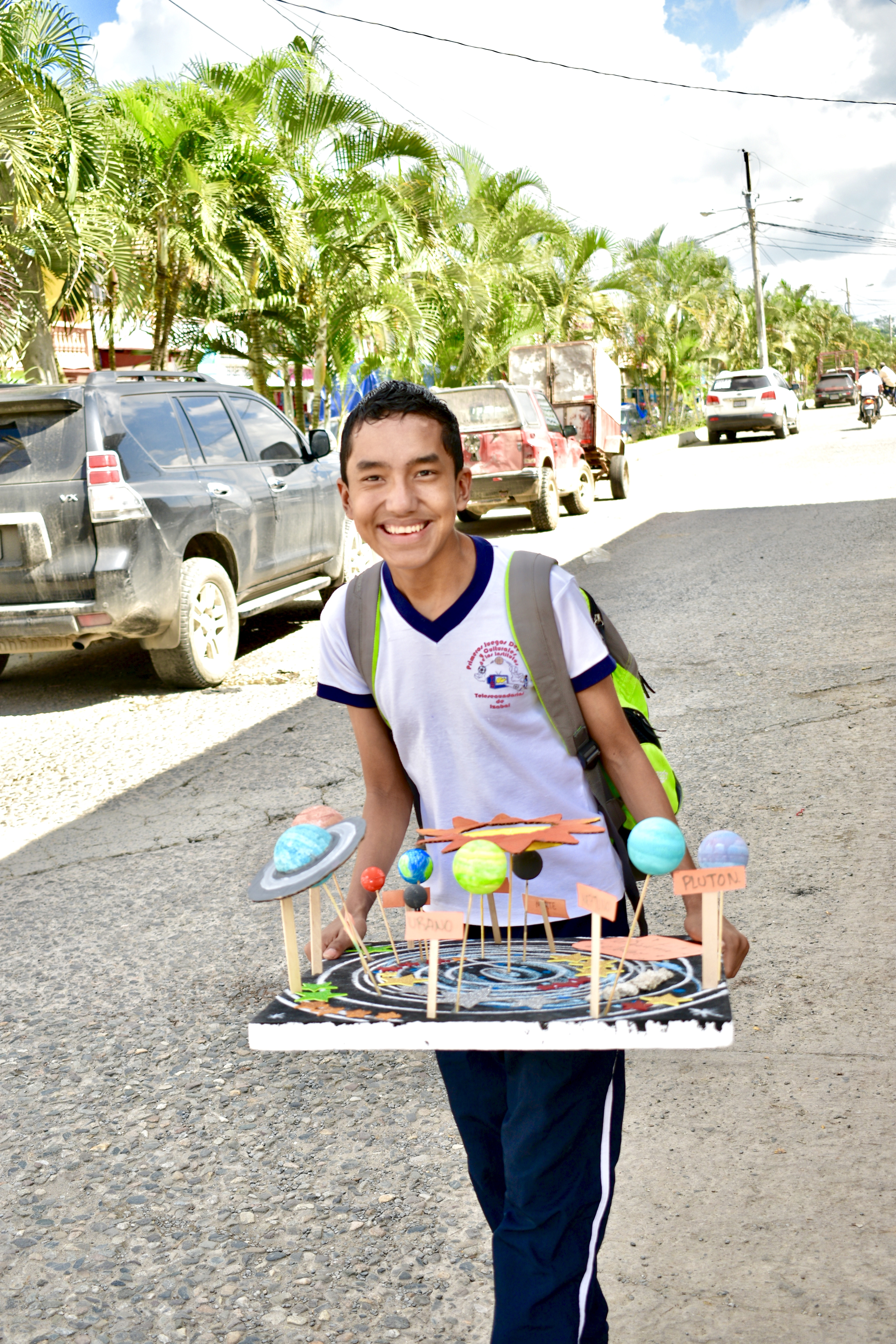
This student is carrying his science project to school.

Display projects involve a creative assembly of a display board and construction of a model to show a visual representation of a larger fact. Making a model of the Solar System, a house, or of a simple electric circuit are considered display projects. Display boards are used to enhance the presentation. A tablet computer can be attached to the display board to make interactive display boards.

== Theoretical projects ==
Theoretical projects may involve the same format as experimental or engineering projects. However, for several possible reasons, such as lack of feasibility due to costs, the actual experiment is not performed.

== See also ==
- Science fair
