= Penveu =

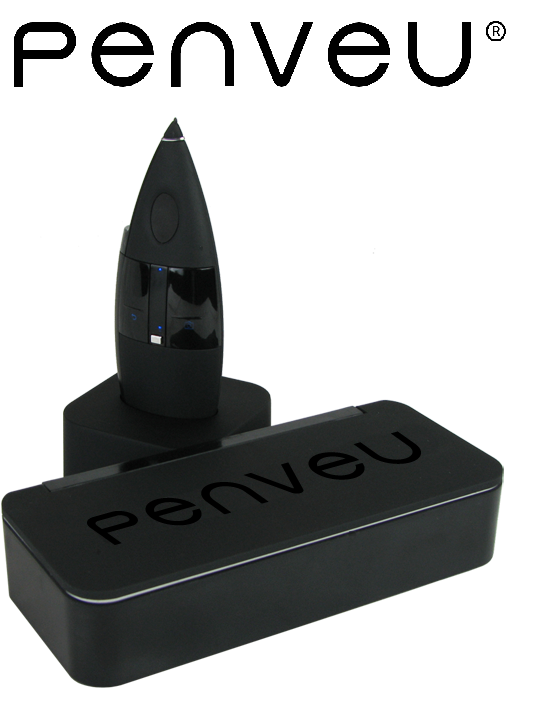
- The penveu system
- Date invented: 2010
- Manufacturer: Interphase Corporation
- Introduced: 2014
- Type: Interactive Display System
- Connection: Computer and TV / Projector
- Ports: USB cable, VGA cable
- Weight: 2 lbs.

The penveu is a pen-like device developed by the American company, Interphase, for use with digital audio-visual presentations.

== History ==
In 1991, SMART Technologies introduced an Interactive Whiteboard, on which the image from a projector was displayed. A USB connection allowed the presenter to virtually interact with the projection. Other after-market products aimed at working with existing projectors (Mimio and eBeam) came out after that. Interphase Corporation (Nasdaq: INPH) was founded in 1974, and filed for initial public offering in 1984. In 2010, penveu was invented. The company developed and tested the concepts for two years until unveiling the product at the DEMO conference in Santa Clara, California, on April 18, 2012. On May 30, 2014, the product was released to the market.

Since the product is made of two electronic boards (one in the handheld pen and one in the base station), the engineering department named those two boards the PEN and the VEU (video enhancement unit). PENVEU became the name of the device.

On September 30, 2015, Interphase Corporation announced it had ceased operations and commenced bankruptcy proceedings.

== Technology ==
The core of the penveu technology surrounds a camera located near the tip of the pen but implemented in two parts of the penveu system: the PEN, and the VEU. The VEU box intercepts the display to add visual targets that include information on its position encoded using a change in brightness. A digital signal processor (DSP) in the pen calculates the position of the tip based on the information retrieved from the targets detected. Since the positioning target system is included in the modified video signal, penveu may not require calibration.

== Awards ==
Penveu received several awards since its introduction into the market, including the "Best of InfoComm 2012", the 2014 "Innovations in Design and Engineering" award and the International Society for Technology in Education (ISTE) inaugural Best of Show" award.
