= Mimio =

Brand name of a line of educational technology products

- Type: Subsidiary
- Industry: Computer technology Computer software
- Products: Interactive whiteboards
- Parent: Boxlight
- Website: mimio.boxlight.com

Mimio is a brand name of a line of technology products aimed at the education market. The primary products were originally focused around computer whiteboard interactive teaching devices. MimioCapture devices also allow users to capture all of the ink strokes that are written on the whiteboard. When used in conjunction with a video projector it turns the ordinary whiteboard surface into a fully interactive whiteboard.

The product line was originally designed by Virtual Ink. On October 4, 2006 Newell Rubbermaid acquired the Mimio interactive whiteboard (iWB) product line. On July 15, 2013, SkyView Capital acquired the Mimio hardware and software product lines.

== History ==
The first Mimio was introduced in 1997.

In November 2008, a Graphics tablet called Mimio Pad was launched under the Mimio brand. It comes with the most popular Mimio studio functions pre-programmed for ease of use. It uses 2.4 GHz wireless technology and has a range of 12m.

In June, 2010, the brand changed to DYMO/Mimio Interactive Teaching Technologies. At the same time, the company introduced five new products at the ISTE(International Society for Technology in Education) 2010 conference in Denver, CO. The new product line, the MimioClassroom family of products, included a redesign of the prior mimio Xi bar. It is called the MimioTeach interactive system, and turns any dry-erase board into an interactive whiteboard. In addition, DYMO/Mimio introduced the MimioVote assessment system, MimioView document camera, and MimioCapture ink recording system.

All of the MimioClassroom products are powered by MimioStudio software.

On March 9, 2011, DYMO/Mimio ITT acquired Headsprout, a provider of adaptive instructional lessons. The acquisition further strengthened the DYMO/Mimio portfolio of innovative and integrated hardware, software, and services. The official announcement was made publicly on March 15, 2011.

In June, 2012, the brand changed back to Mimio. At that time, Mimio launched the new MimioReading comprehension suite, based on the original Headsprout Reading Comprehension product. MimioReading builds on the individualized computer instruction of Headsprout Reading Comprehension by adding complementary lessons for group instruction at the whiteboard, as well as a MimioStudio software license and iPad app.

At the beginning of 2015, Mimio had the following classroom technology products: MimioTeach; MimioProjector 280, 280I and 280T; MimioDisplay 550T, 650T, 700T, and 840T; MimioBoard 780T and 870T; MimioCapture3; MimioPad2; MimioView 340H; MimioVote32; MimioStudio Notebook software and MimioMobile app.

On Feb. 29, 2016 the Mimio education suite was acquired by the Boxlight Corporation, a manufacturer of classroom technology that was to that point best-known as a top brand for interactive displays and projectors.

== Hardware products ==
Mimio has perhaps the broadest core product line in the Interactive Classroom Technology market. Mimio's product line ranges from MimioTeach, a portable interactive solution that, as Mimio puts it, "turns any whiteboard into an interactive whiteboard in thirty seconds," through MimioProjector, MimioBoard Touch and a family of four Interactive Flat Panel Displays introduced in 2013.

Mimio also has a range of accessory products including the MimioView document camera.

As of 2015, Mimio has the following classroom technology products: MimioTeach; MimioProjector 280, 280I and 280T; MimioDisplay 550T, 650T, 700T, and 840T; MimioBoard 780T and 870T; MimioCapture3; MimioPad2; MimioView 340H; MimioVote32; MimioStudio Notebook software and MimioMobile app.

== Software products ==
MimioStudio is a Power-Point-like application with unique features added to enable interactivity and, through the MimioMobile add-on, to push interactive instructional activities and assessments out to student iPad and Android tablets and SmartPhones.

As of 2015, Mimio has the following classroom technology products: MimioTeach; MimioProjector 280, 280I and 280T; MimioDisplay 550T, 650T, 700T, and 840T; MimioBoard 780T and 870T; MimioCapture3; MimioPad2; MimioView 340H; MimioVote32; MimioStudio Notebook software and MimioMobile app.

== Use ==
Mimio hardware and/or software is in roughly 1,000,000 classrooms in over 50 countries. The software is available in 30 languages and is designed for great ease of use.

== Technology history ==
The MimioTeach interactive whiteboard system is typically attached to a whiteboard using magnets and to the teacher's PC via a USB connection or through MimioHub, a proprietary wireless USB link. The teacher's PC is then attached to a video projector. A MimioStylus pen is calibrated to the MimioTeach system using a combination of Ultrasound and Infrared to identify its location. Essentially ultrasonic pulses are timed as transmitted from the MimioStylus and received at two ultrasonic microphones on the MimioTeach. Through Trilateration the location of the stylus is determined, and the tracking data sent to the teacher's PC. The MimioStylus acts as a mouse to allow the user to manipulate the contents of their computer as its displayed on the dry erase board. Unlike traditional interactive board based technologies, such as Resistive Touch, the combination of ultrasound and infrared can scale from small whiteboards to very large ones. In another important differentiator, MimioTeach is portable rather than being a large, heavy electronic whiteboard.

Mimio products build on the original technology and newer development including MimioTouch 360° that supports up to six touch points on the MimioBoard Touch and MimioDisplay products.

== Awards ==
- 2014 Award of Excellence, Tech & Learning Magazine
- 2014 eSchool News 2014-15 Readers' Choice Award
- 2014 Cool Tool Award: MimioMobile App with MimioStudio Classroom Software
- 2013 Mimio products make District Administration's list of Top 100 Products
- 2013 Award of Excellence, Tech & Learning Magazine
- 2012 Award of Excellence / Best Upgraded Product, Tech & Learning Magazine
- January, 2001 "Best in Show", MacWorld
- June, 2001 "District's Choice", Curriculum Administrator magazine
- 2001, "Freakin' Awesome" rating, MacAddict
- 2001, 2002, 2007, 2008, 2010, 2011 "Readers' Choice Top 100 Products", District Administration magazine
- 2009, 2010, 2011 "Best in Tech", Scholastic Administrator magazine
- 2011 reddot design award for MimioClassroom products
- 2011 Best Educational Use of a Device-Specific Application, SIIA CODiE Award for MimioStudio 7

== See also ==
- Mimeo (abbreviation of mimeograph) - a mechanical duplication device. The name mimio was likely chosen to evoke an association with this device.
