= Whiteboard =

Surface for nonpermanent markings

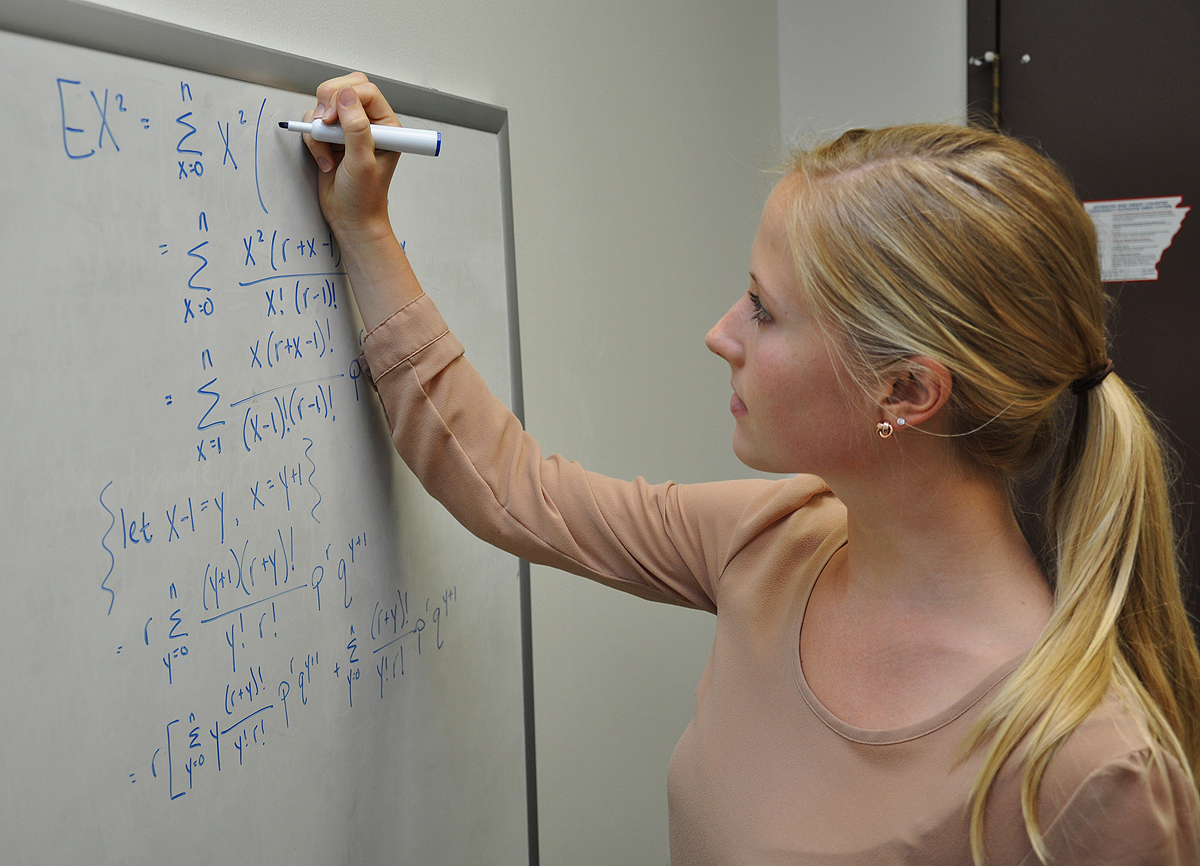
Researcher writing on a whiteboard

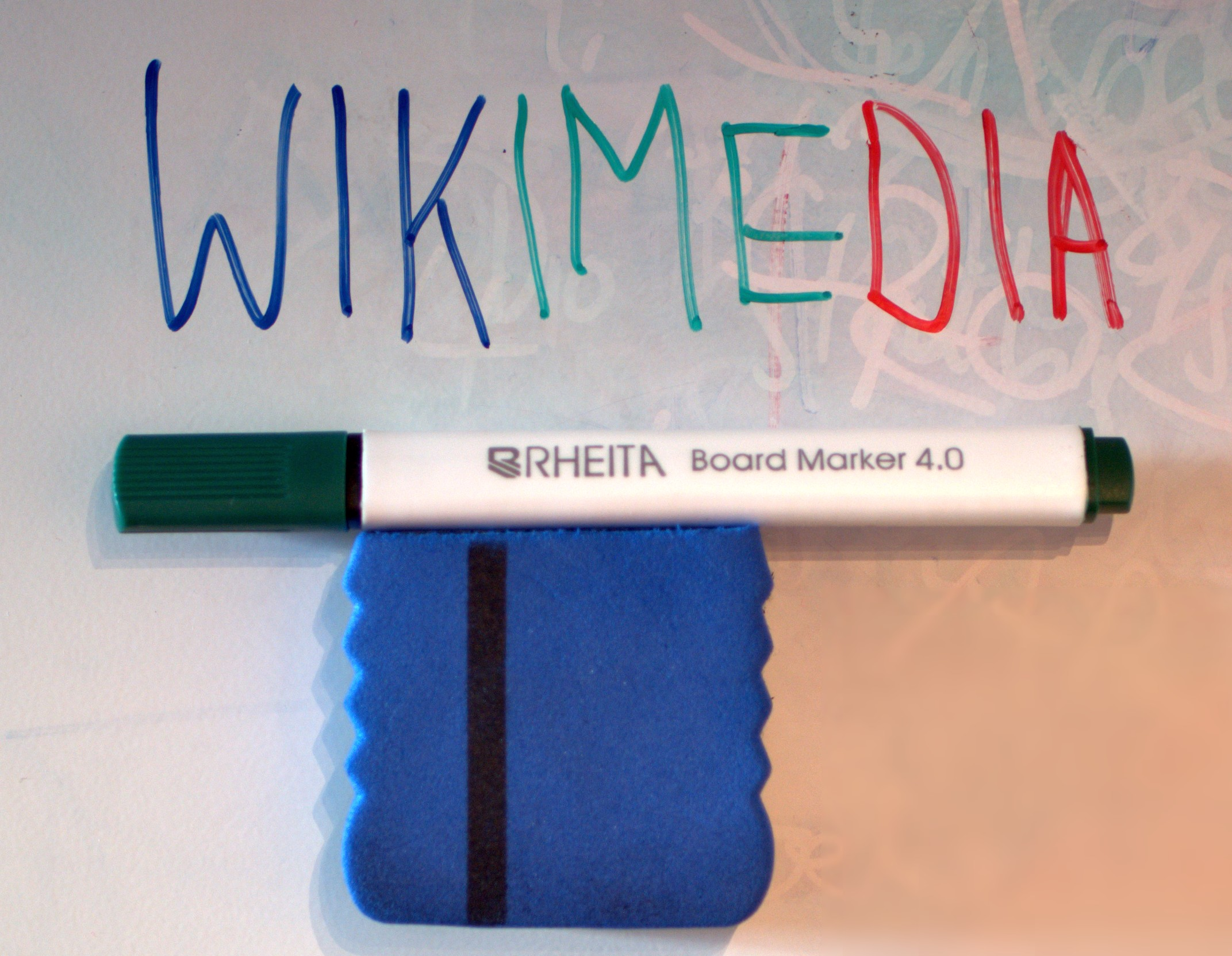
Whiteboard with marker and eraser

A whiteboard (also known as marker board, dry-erase board, dry-wipe board, and pen-board) is a glossy, usually white surface for making non-permanent markings. Whiteboards are analogous to blackboards, but with a smoother surface allowing for rapid marking and erasing of markings on their surface. The popularity of whiteboards increased rapidly in the mid-1990s and they have become a fixture in many offices, meeting rooms, school classrooms, public events and other work environments.

The term whiteboard is also used metaphorically in reference to features of computer software applications that simulate whiteboards. Such "virtual tech whiteboards" allow one or more people to write or draw images on a simulated canvas. This is a common feature of many virtual meetings, collaborations, and instant messaging applications.

== History ==
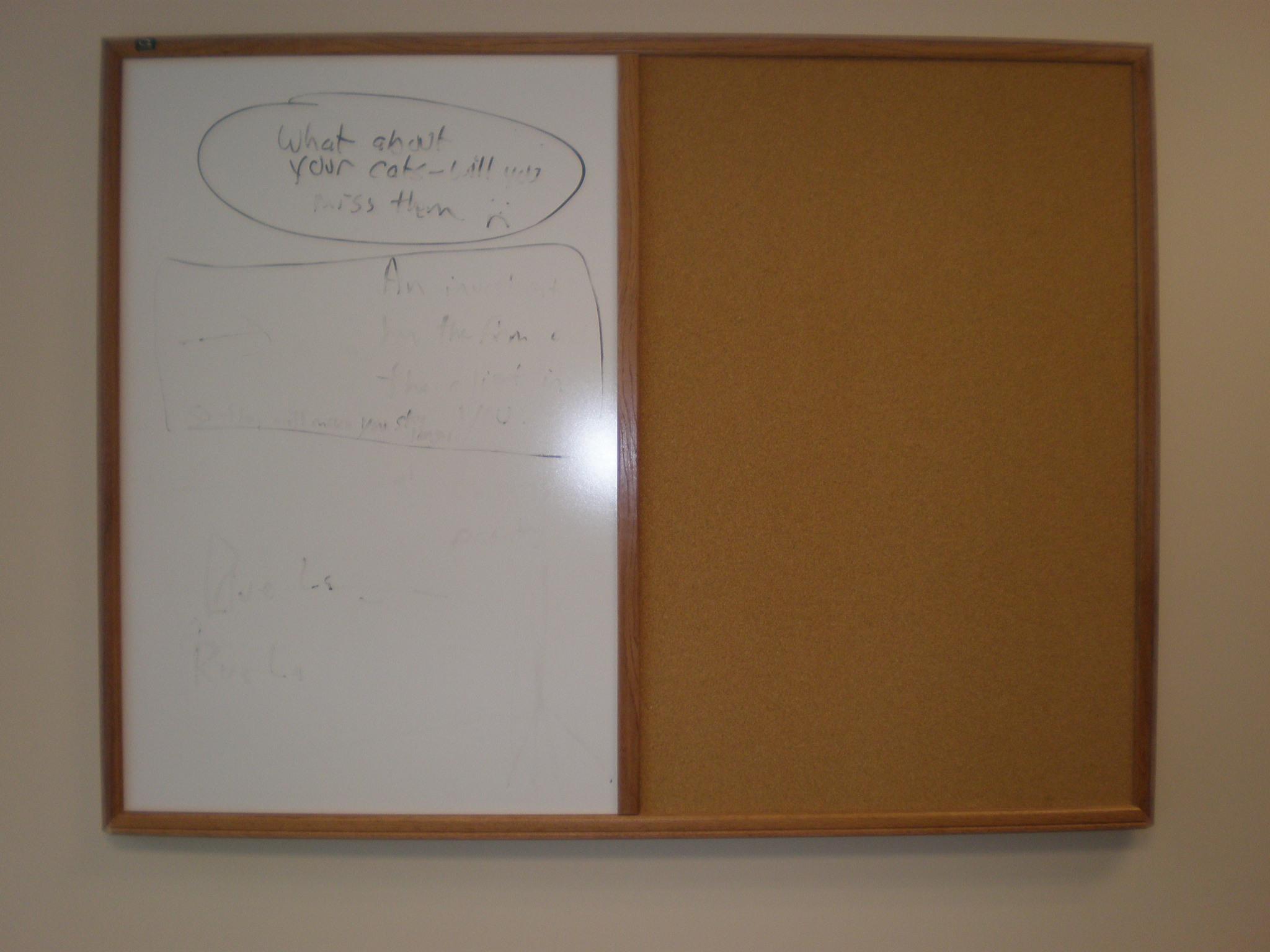
A combination whiteboard/cork bulletin board

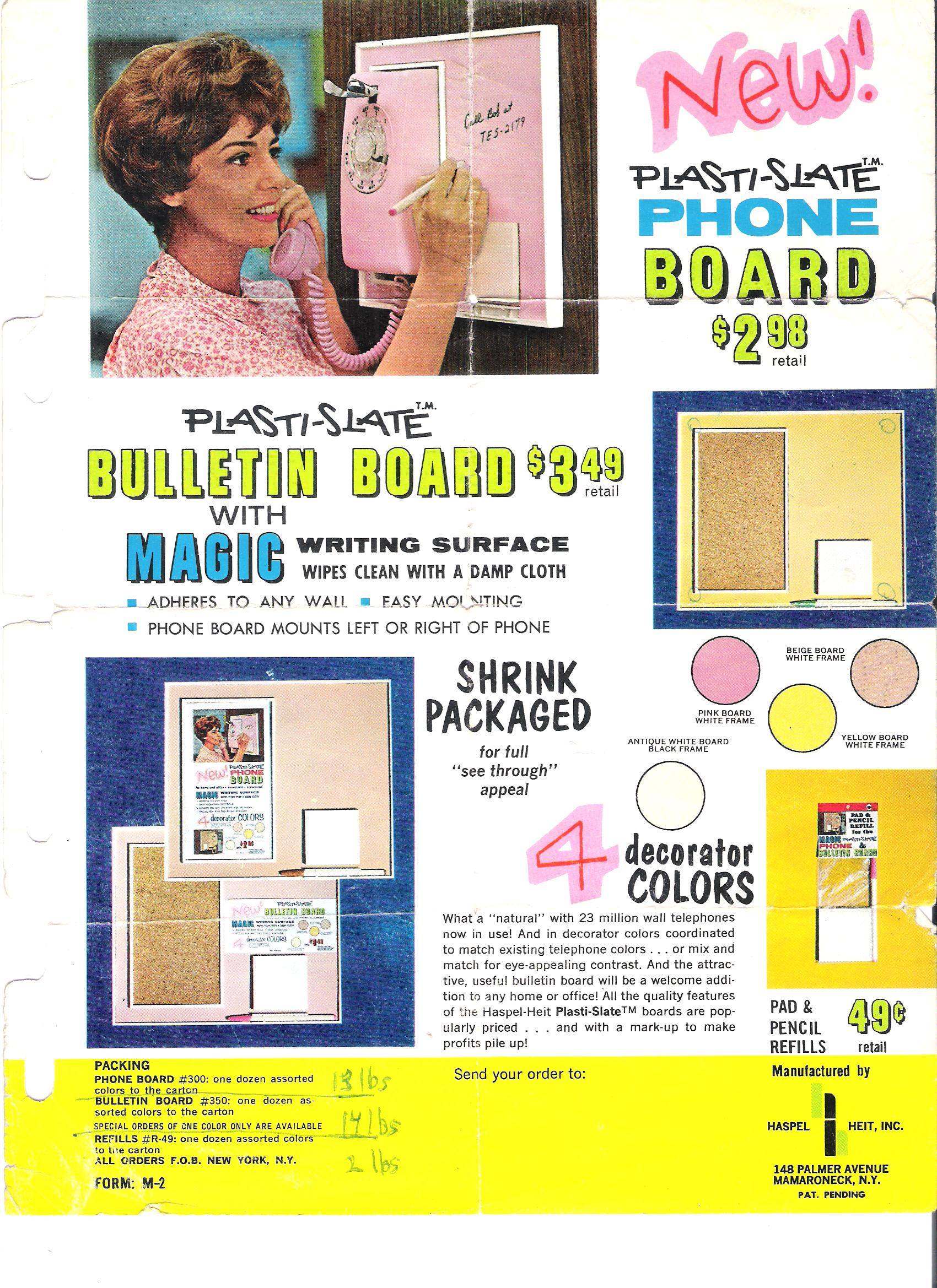
Original early 1960s ad for "Plasti-slate", the first whiteboard/dry erase board invented by Martin Heit

It has been widely reported that Korean War veteran and photographer Martin Heit and Albert Stallion, an employee at Alliance, a leading flat rolled steel sheet supplier, should be credited with the invention of the whiteboard in the 1950s. At the same time Esmond Hellerman in the UK also invented the whiteboard using adhesive to cover existing blackboards. Heit and Stallion may have popularized and/or perfected whiteboards, but in reality the history of whiteboards long precedes them. A thorough examination of the invention of whiteboards reveals that the concept was introduced two decades earlier by mechanical engineer Avery D. Butler who installed one in a classroom in Elgin, Ill., in 1937.

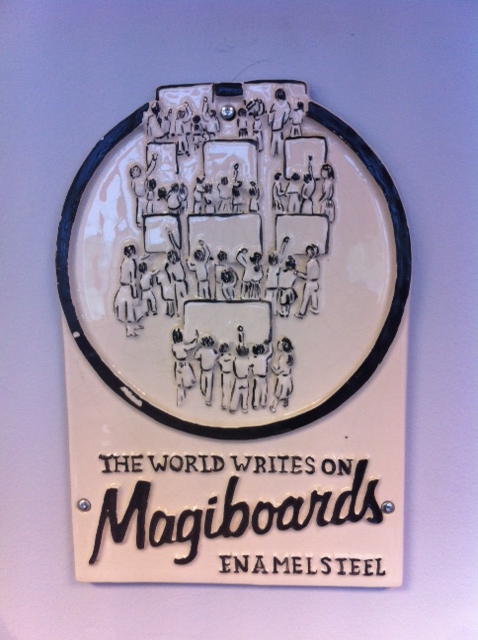
Door sign to the offices of Magiboards at The Cut in Waterloo, London, in 1966. Made of enameled steel.

Whiteboards became commercially available in the early 1960s, but did not become widely used until 30 years later. Early whiteboards needed to be wiped with a damp cloth and markers had a tendency to leave marks behind, even after the board was erased.

In 1974, whiteboards were proposed as additional equipment for Soviet schools.

Whiteboards began being commonly used by businesses in the early 1990s. They became more common in classrooms during the 1990s due to concerns over health problems in children with dust allergies and the potential for chalk dust to damage computers. By the late 1990s, about 21% of American classrooms had converted from chalkboards to whiteboards.

== Types ==
=== Adhesive whiteboards ===
Whiteboard material can be bought in rolls, sheets, and pre-formed boards. Adhesive whiteboards come in either a sheet or a roll and feature a stick back enabling the user to create a custom size board or project with the material. Although adhesive whiteboard material does not come in a thick, hard glass or painted steel plate, the melamine allows for a flexible material while preserving the high-quality whiteboard attributes of other surface materials. Adhesive whiteboards allow for custom projects such as dry erase wall calendars, whiteboard tables, cupboard grocery lists, indoor games for kids, and more.

=== Dry Erase Whiteboards ===
Dry erase whiteboards are one of the most used and popular types of whiteboards. They enable one to easily erase things after writing them, making them popular in classrooms and other educational settings where communication of information should be simple. Marker pens are also used to write on whiteboards.

=== Surface materials ===
- Glass

Glass whiteboards sport sleek, modern appearances and provide superior durability. These boards typically feature tempered glass, which makes them highly resistant to scratches and dents. One of the standout features of glass whiteboards is their exceptional erasability. Users can effortlessly wipe away marks from dry-erase markers that leave no ghosting or residue behind. Additionally, glass whiteboards are non-porous, which means they will not absorb ink or stains over time.

- Porcelain

Porcelain whiteboards, also known as ceramic whiteboards, are another popular choice due to their durability and high-quality writing surface. Manufacturers produce these boards by fusing a ceramic coating to a steel substrate, resulting in a hard, smooth surface that is resistant to scratches, stains, and fading. Porcelain whiteboards last for long periods and can withstand heavy use without showing significant wear and tear.

- Melamine

A resin-infused paper which is typically used over a substrate that can range from particle board to MDF (medium density fiberboard). Melamine boards range in quality primarily because of the amount of resin deposited on the base material. Some melamine boards remain clean (no ghosting) for a long time, others less so. Generally, this least expensive type of whiteboard is most commonly found in use in non-institutional applications. They are available in any office supply store. Performance varies widely. These boards are not suitable for heavy use, as in many educational cases, with time the paint erodes and the original surface reappears.

- Dry-Erase Paints

Dry-erase paint is a two-part epoxy or polyurethane coating that can be applied directly to the wall. Installation requires wall prep, priming, painting, and curing. Once cured, the paint forms a cross-linked polymer network, creating a scratch resistant writing surface. Dry-erase paints are most commonly used for consumer home use thanks to the surface's relative ease of installation. Despite the strong mechanical adhesion of dry-erase paints, the cured film often exhibits microscopic surface irregularities, leading to pigment entrapment. As a result, painted writing surfaces require reapplication every 2–5 years.

== See also ==
- Album (Ancient Rome) – A board chalked or painted white, on which public notices were inscribed in black
- Display board – Folding board to present information
- Flip chart – Stationery item consisting of a pad of large paper sheets, often used in presentations
- Grease pencil – Writing tool with a core of coloured wax
- Interactive whiteboard – Large interactive display
