= Interest fair =

School event

A good example of an Interest Fair board.

An interest fair is an event somewhat like a science fair usually organized by a school that involves a group of corrugated cardboard boards on which students put information on their favorite topic or hobby Originally they also had to write a short paper. Unlike a science fair, it has both competitive and non-competitive elements.

== History ==
The interest fair originated in Columbus, Ohio at St. Joseph Montessori school. It was created as an alternative to the science fair because they wanted more flexibility. They wanted to focus on the student. When they did it they invited 6- to 14-year-old students to do an interest fair, but required the older students to do it. The students were judged and had to tell visitors about their Interest Fair board.

Over time the idea caught on, and it has evolved between schools, so it has been seen in many variations. In some schools the competitive element is completely removed, so there are no judges. In others, only the upper grade levels get to participate. In some places the students do not have to discuss their topic with visitors. Sometimes the students have to write a paper. The project may be optional or required. The rubric is almost always used.
