= Open-Sankoré =

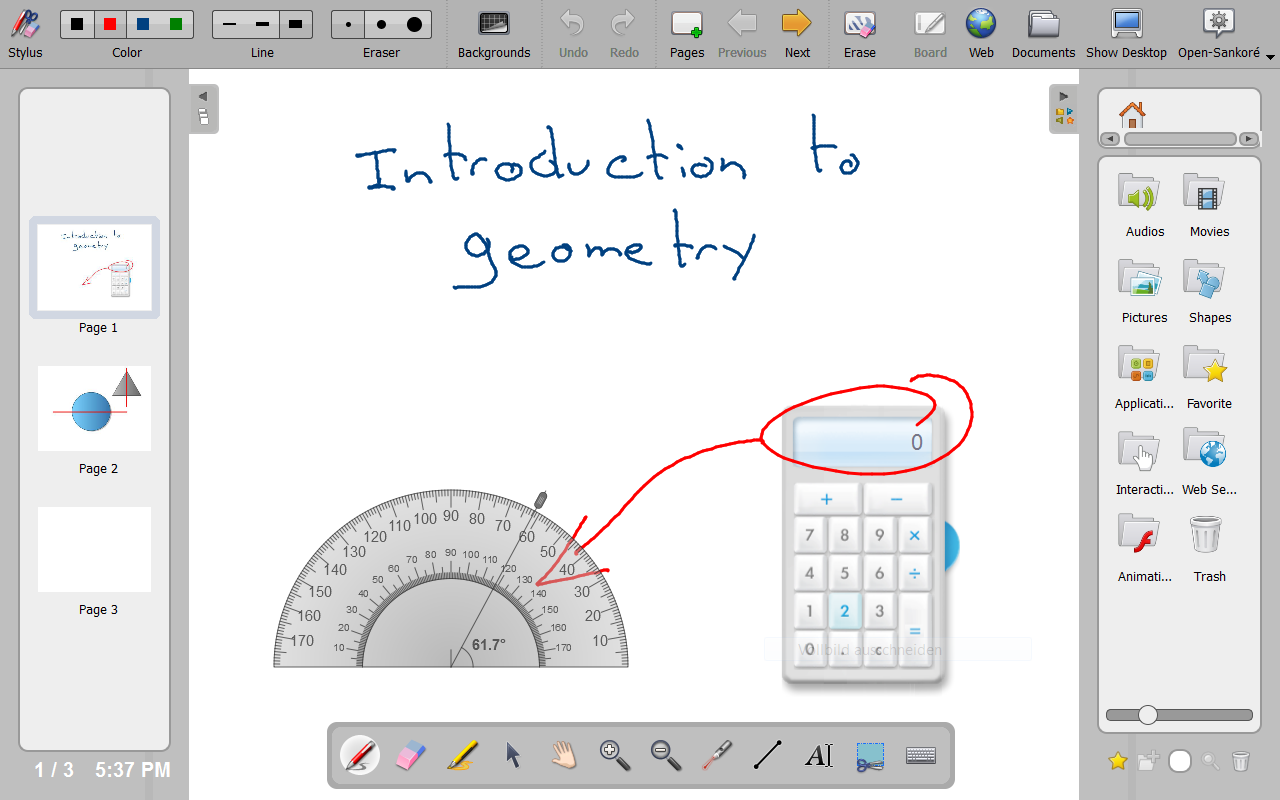
- Open-Sankoré 1.4 running on Windows 7 in full screen
- Developer(s): Sankoré
- Initial release: 2003; 22 years ago
- Final release: 2.5.1 / May 1, 2013; 11 years ago
- Written in: C++, HTML, Javascript, Qt
- Operating system: Microsoft Windows, Mac OS X, Linux
- Available in: French, English, German, Russian, Simplified Chinese, Korean, Japanese, Portuguese, Spanish, Italian, Dutch, Swedish, Danish, Norwegian
- Type: Interactive whiteboard
- License: 2010: LGPL-2.0-only (Note: LGPL-2.0-only with a linking exception for OpenSSL); 2003: Proprietary
- Website: http://open-sankore.org

Open-Sankoré is a free and open-source interactive whiteboard software compatible with any projector and pointing device.

Open-Sankoré development stopped but the fork OpenBoard remains active.

== History ==
Open-Sankoré is based on the Uniboard software originally developed at the University of Lausanne, Switzerland. The software started to be developed in 2003 and was first used by the teachers of the University in October 2003. The project was later spun off to a local startup company, Mnemis SA. It was subsequently sold to the French Public Interest Grouping for Digital Education in Africa (GIP ENA) which bought the intellectual property of the software in order to make it an open source project under the GNU Lesser General Public License (LGPL-2.0-only). The DIENA was founded to share the software in African countries and develop free educational material

Since November 2015 neither DIENA nor Open-Sankoré respond to emails. The source of Open-Sankoré was last changed in January 2015. A new version should be developed for 2017.

It should be an Open-Sankoré 2.5.2 in 2017 (current version 2.5.1). The French education administration is building a new concept until June 2016 with the Direction du numérique pour l'éducation (DNE).

=== Fork ===
In 2013 The GIP ENA would be dissolved. Since 2013 the Open-Sankoré support, contact, bug report don't answer. The DIENA responsible for the project don't answer.

In September 2014 a fork, OpenBoard, was started by the education administration of Geneva, écoles-médias (SEM). It is based on Open-Sankoré 2.0 version 2.0 and the license was upgraded to GPL-3.0-only. (Note: GPL-3.0-only with a linking exception for OpenSSL)

== Innovations ==
Open-Sankoré is the first feature-complete open-source interactive whiteboard. In contrast to other similar software, its file format is text-based and uses a W3C web standard, allowing to be displayed in a modern web browser and enabling lessons to be distributed online without additional software. Second, the software can be extended using W3C-compliant widgets, allowing user flexibility.

== Impact ==
The French government has set up an Interministerial Delegation for Digital Education in Africa (DIENA) and a Public Interest Grouping for Digital Education in Africa (GIP ENA) in order to implement a multi-year program for developing digital education in many African partner countries. Open-Sankoré is one of the strategies of this group to try to achieve the Millennium Development Goals for education in Africa, an initiative of the United Nations.

== See also ==
- Educational software
- Educational technology
- Smart Board
- OpenBoard
