= Luidia, Inc. =

Luidia, Inc. produces portable interactive whiteboard technology for classrooms and conference rooms. Its eBeam hardware and software products work with computers and digital projectors to use existing whiteboard or writing surface as interactive whiteboards.

The company’s eBeam products allow text, images and video to be projected onto display surfaces, where an interactive stylus or marker can be used to add notes, access menus, manipulate images and create diagrams and drawings.

== Technology ==
Luidia’s eBeam technology uses infrared and ultrasound receivers to track the location of a transmitter-equipped pen, called a stylus, or a standard dry-erase marker in a transmitter-equipped sleeve.

== Company history ==
Luidia’s eBeam technology was originally developed and patented by engineers at Electronics for Imaging Inc. (Nasdaq: EFII), a Foster City, California developer of digital print server technology. Luidia was spun off from EFI in July 2003 with venture funding from Globespan Capital Partners and Silicom Ventures.

In 2007, Luidia was selected by the Mexican government to install eBeam-enabled interactive boards in public seventh-grade classrooms in Mexico as part of the government’s Enciclomedia program.

In 2007 and 2008, Luidia was accredited by Deloitte in the accounting firm’s Silicon Valley “Technology Fast 50” program, which accredits fast-growing companies in the San Francisco Bay area.

In January 2021 their main sites and web documentation started returning 404 errors; however, their shop was still up. In 2022, Ludia sent out notice that it would be shutting down in July of that year.
