= OpenBoard =

Open-source interactive whiteboard software

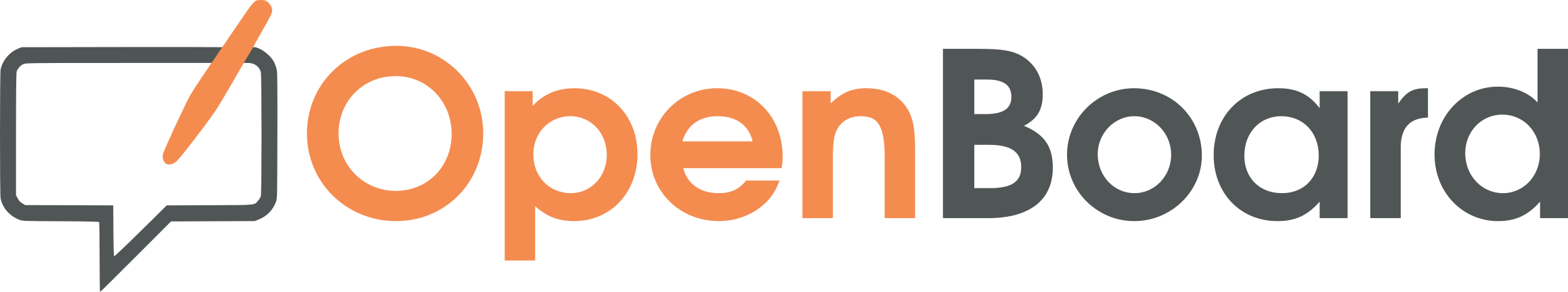

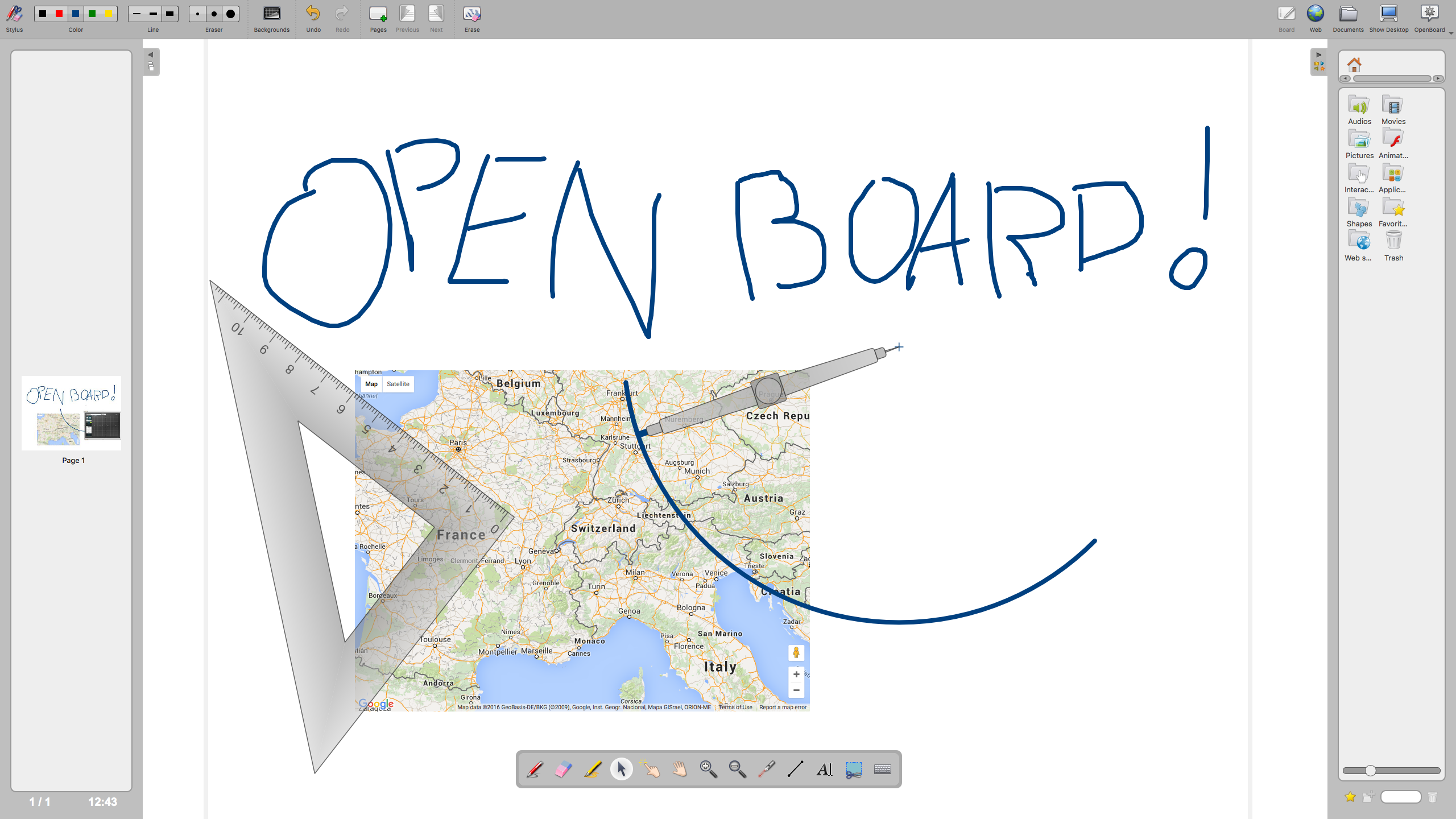
- Screenshot of OpenBoard
- Developer: Service écoles-média of the Public Instruction Department of the State of Geneva
- Release: 2013; 13 years ago
- Stable release: 1.7.7 / 30 March 2026; 2 months ago
- Written in: C++, Qt, html, css and js for embed widgets
- Operating system: Linux, Windows, OS X
- Platform: x86, x86-64
- Available in: 35 languages
- List of languages Arabic, Basque, Bulgarian, Catalan, Chinese, Chinese (China), Chinese (Taiwan), Croatian, Czech, Danish, Dutch, English, English (UK), French, French (Switzerland), Galician, German, Greek, Hebrew, Hungarian, Italian, Japanese, Korean, Malagasy, Norwegian Bokmål, Polish, Portuguese, Portuguese (Brazil), Romanian, Russian, Slovak, Spanish, Swedish, Turkish, Ukrainian
- Type: Interactive whiteboard software
- License: GPL-3.0-only (Note: GPL-3.0-only with a linking exception for OpenSSL)
- Website: openboard.ch/index.en.html
- Repository: github.com/OpenBoard-org/OpenBoard

OpenBoard is a free and open-source interactive whiteboard software compatible with any projector and pointing device.

It was originally forked from Open-Sankoré in 2013 with the intention to focus on simplicity and stability. The license was upgraded from LGPL-2.0-only to GPL-3.0-only. Since version 1.7.2 it is based on Qt 6 framework.

== History ==
OpenBoard is a fork of the project based on Open-Sankoré 2,0. Open-Sankoré itself is based on the Uniboard software originally developed at the University of Lausanne (UNIL), Switzerland. The software started to be developed in 2003 and was first used by the instructors of the UL in October 2003. The project was later spun off to a local startup company, Mnemis SA. It was subsequently sold to the French Public Interest Grouping for Digital Education in Africa (GIP ENA) which bought the intellectual property of the software in order to make it an open source project under the GNU Lesser General Public License (LGPL-2.0-only).
