= EBeam =

eBeam was an interactive whiteboard system developed by Luidia, Inc. that transformed any standard whiteboard or other surface into an interactive display and writing surface.

Luidia's eBeam hardware and software products allowed text, images, and video to be projected onto a variety of surfaces, where an interactive stylus or marker could be used to add notes, access control menus, manipulate images, and create diagrams and drawings. The presentations, notes, and images could be saved and emailed to class or meeting participants, as well as shared in real-time either on local networks or over the Internet.

== History ==
An eBeam demo was given at the Apple Expo 2002 in Paris, France.

The production of eBeam hardware was discontinued in 2020. As of June 2022, Luidia has ceased all operations.

== Technology ==
Luidia's eBeam technology was originally developed and patented by engineers at Electronics for Imaging Inc. (Nasdaq: EFII), a Foster City, California, developer of digital print server technology. Luidia was spun off from EFI in July 2003 with venture funding from Globespan Capital Partners and Silicom Ventures.

== See also ==
- Office equipment
- Display technology
- Educational technology
