= Quad chart =

Brief document presented in four quadrants

A quad chart is a form of technical documentation used to briefly describe an invention or other innovation through writing, illustration and/or photographs. Such documents are described as "quad" charts because they are divided into four quadrants laid out on a landscape perspective. They are typically one-page only; their succinctness facilitates rapid decision-making. Though shorter, quad charts often serve in a similar capacity to white papers and the two documents are often requested alongside one another.

== History ==
Quad charts as a genre were developed by the United States Department of Commerce's National Oceanic and Atmospheric Administration in an attempt to improve budgeting and planning systems, and became widely used in the Administration's National Weather Service. The genre's development was parallel to that of display boards, also an early tool used by the NWS for staff communication.

In the early 2000s, software was developed to allow automated creation of quad charts as a means of saving time for technical writers who would otherwise spend long periods of time drafting them.

== Significance ==
Both government agencies and large businesses often require submission of a quad chart on the part of potential contractors as part of the contract bidding process. NASA, for example, uses quad charts to document the process of all Small Business Innovation Research projects. Because decision makers often review a large volume of both solicited and unsolicited proposals, the quad chart may be the only submission from a potential contractor which the decision maker actually reads.

Due to the nature of quad charts as relatively short documents, there are opportunities for misuse. While quad charts are intended for brief overviews of a topic, they can also be misconstrued to influence public policy and budgeting decisions, as was the case with the politicization of the National Defense Strategy's 2005 edition.

== Content ==
While there are no industry-wide standards for quad charts, there are a number of common elements. In addition to the title of the invention or idea and the name of the developer, the technical approach and the need which the invention or idea addresses are often included. Decision makers often look to operational needs first, though including the cost and projected schedule are also often required elements.
