= Annales maximi =

The Annales maximi were annals kept by the pontifex maximus during the Roman Republic. The chief priest of the Capitoline would record key public events and the names of each of the magistrates. He would keep a detailed record and publish an abbreviated version on a white board (tabula dealbata) outside the Regia or the Domus Publica.

Cicero refers to the practice explicitly, and Cato condemned the apparent triviality and superstition of it (as well as the fact that it kept track of bad news, such as famines). The earliest records were accounts of mythological events, which gave credence to Cato's rejection. However, early Roman historians used the Annales maximi extensively, and legitimate records went, according to Cicero, to 400 BC. By the time of the Gracchi (~130 BC), when the annal ceased, it filled eighty books. The collection was published by pontifex maximus Publius Mucius Scaevola.

== See also ==
- Roman historiography

== Sources ==
- Cornell, Tim J (1999). "Annales Maximi". The Oxford Classical Dictionary (3rd ed.). Oxford: Oxford University Press. p. 98. ISBN 9780198661726.
- Elliott, Jackie (21 November 2013). Ennius and the Architecture of the Annales. Cambridge University Press. pp. 24–. ISBN 978-1-107-02748-0.
