= Community bulletin board =

Digital signage system via cable television

A community bulletin board (CBB) is a digital signage system via cable television for public, educational, and government access to keep communities up to date of events listings, weather and other news.

The electronic bulletin board concept is a form of technological convergence.
