= Album (Ancient Rome) =

An album (Latin: albus, lit. 'white'), in ancient Rome, was a board plastered with chalk or gypsum, or painted white (tabula dealbata), on which decrees, edicts and other ephemeral public notices were inscribed in ink using a calamus (reed pen). Albus were early predecessors of bulletin boards. In medieval and modern times the meaning of the word album changed to refer to a book of blank pages in which verses, autographs, sketches, photographs and the like are collected. An ancient Greek equivalent was called leukomata (Ancient Greek: λεύκωμα pl. λευκώματα).

== History ==
The Annales maximi of the Pontifex maximus, the annual edicts of the praetor, the lists of Roman and municipal senators (decuriones) and jurors (album indicum) were exhibited in this manner. The Acta Diurna, a sort of daily government gazette, containing an officially authorized narrative of noteworthy events in Rome was also published this way. Some researchers disagree with this description of the process that belongs to Servius the Grammarian (cf. Brennan 1990).

== Legacy ==
The medieval and modern meaning of album, as a book of blank pages in which verses, autographs, sketches, photographs and the like are collected, derives from the Roman use. This in turn led to the modern meaning of an album as a collection of audio recordings issued as a single item on CD, record, audio tape or another medium.

Another deviation is also applied to the official list of matriculated students in a university, and to the roll in which a bishop inscribes the names of the diocese's clergy. In law, the word is the equivalent of mailles blanches, for rent paid in silver ("white") money.

== Sources ==
- Brennan, T. Corey (1990). "Review of A. Momigliano, The Classical foundations of modern Historiography". Bryn Mawr Classical Review. 1 (2): 74–78. doi:10.7282/T3VT1VJ1. "the tabula dealbata is a late, monstrous invention"
- Chisholm, Hugh, ed. (1911). "Album" . Encyclopædia Britannica. Vol. 1 (11th ed.). Cambridge University Press. p. 513.
- Chisholm, Hugh, ed. (1911). "Acta Diurna" . Encyclopædia Britannica. Vol. 1 (11th ed.). Cambridge University Press. p. 159.
- Forsythe, Gary (1994-11-08). The Historian L. Calpurnius Piso Frugi and the Roman Annalistic Tradition. Lanham, MD: University Press of America. ISBN 0-8191-9742-4.
- Gottesman, Alex (2014). "A tour of the Agora". Politics and the Street in Democratic Athens. Cambridge University Press. pp. 26–43.
- Rhodes, P. J. (2001). "Public Documents in the Greek States: Archives and Inscriptions, Part I". Greece & Rome. 48 (1). Cambridge University Press: 33–44. ISSN 0017-3835. JSTOR 826868.
- Zavaroni, Adolfo (2024-03-25). Etymological Dictionary of Etruscan Words: Updated Version (in Italian). Youcanprint. ISBN 979-12-227-2465-2.
