= Bulletin board =

Board, usually cork, for pinning notices to

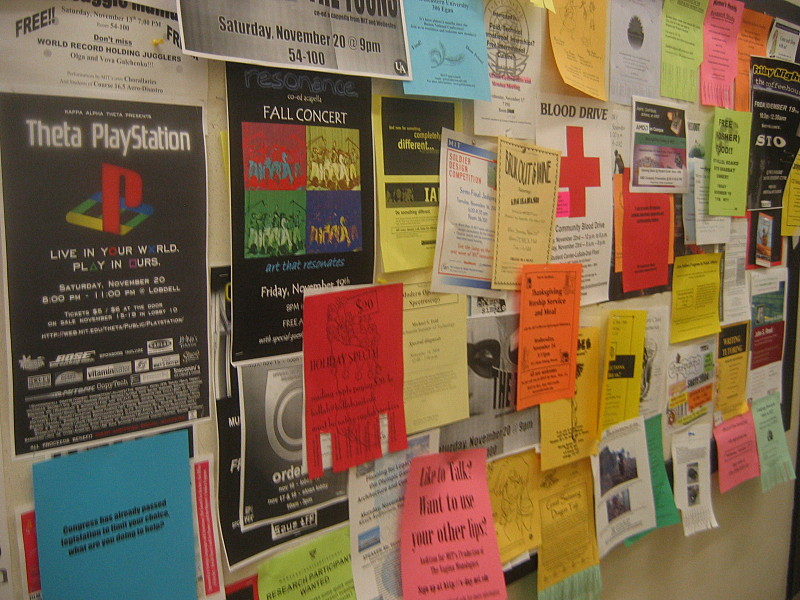
Well-used bulletin board on the Infinite Corridor at MIT, November 2004

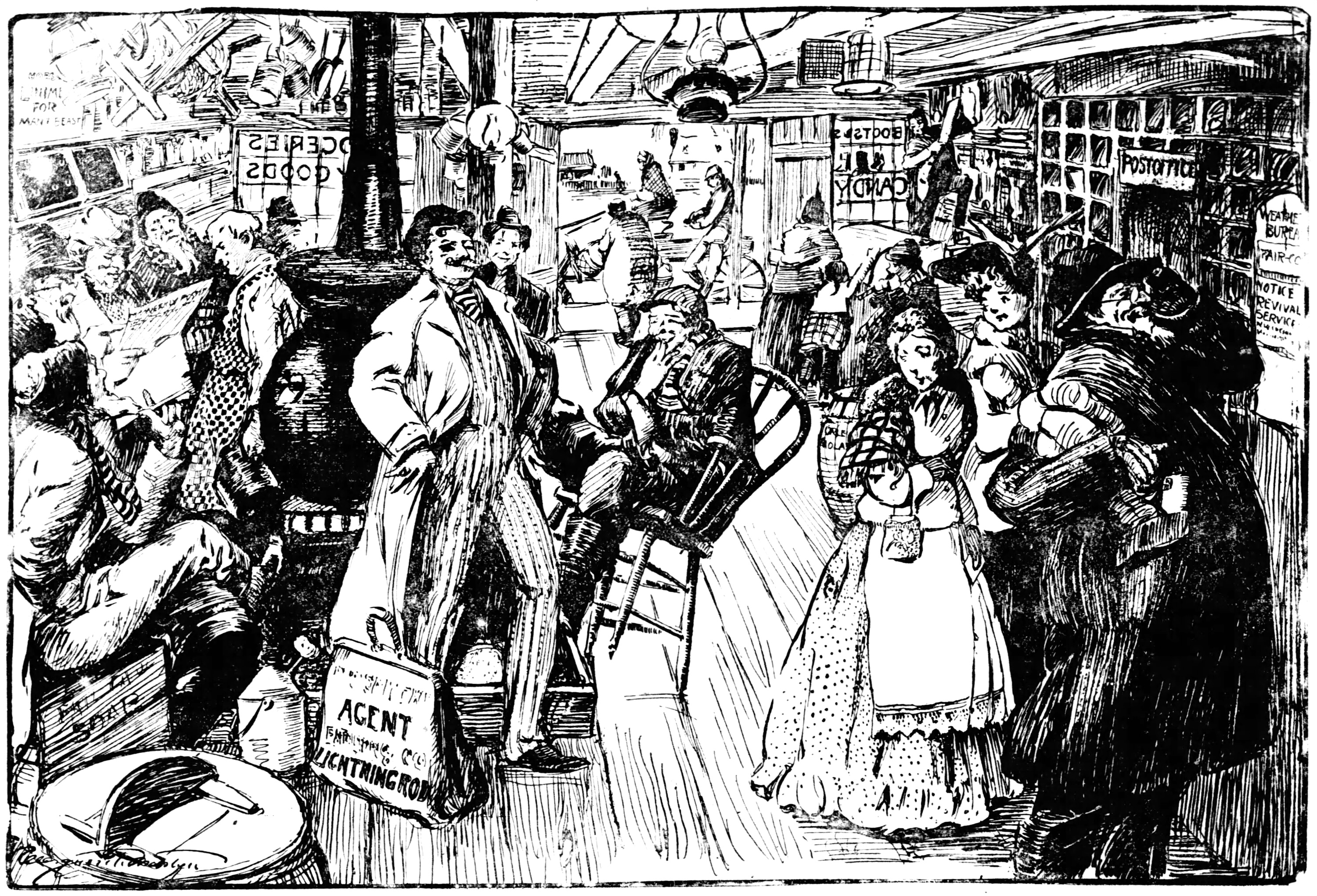
Fanciful drawing of a general store by Marguerite Martyn in the St. Louis Post-Dispatch of October 21, 1906. A man at right reads a notice of a revival service on a bulletin board.

A bulletin board (pinboard, pin board, cork board, noticeboard, or notice board in British English) is a surface intended for the posting of messages, for example public ones may advertise items wanted or for sale, announce events, or provide information. Bulletin boards are often made of a material such as cork to facilitate addition and removal of messages, as well as a writing surface such as whiteboard or blackboard. A bulletin board which combines a pinboard (corkboard) and writing surface is known as a combination bulletin board. Bulletin boards can also be entirely in the digital domain and placed on computer networks so people can leave and erase messages for other people to read and see, as in a bulletin board system.

Bulletin boards are particularly prevalent at universities. They are used by many sports groups and extracurricular groups and anything from local shops to official notices. Dormitory corridors, well-trafficked hallways, lobbies, and freestanding kiosks often have cork boards attached to facilitate the posting of notices. At some universities, lampposts, bollards, trees, and walls often become impromptu posting sites in areas where official boards are sparse in number.

Physical community bulletin boards remain in use for local advertising and neighborhood announcements. In San Francisco, an ongoing project documented in 2025 has mapped community bulletin boards in laundromats, cafés, parks, public squares, and other neighborhood spaces. By September 2026, the project listed 187 locations across 47 neighborhoods.

Internet forums are a replacement for traditional bulletin boards. Online bulletin boards are sometimes referred to as message boards. The terms bulletin board, message board and even Internet forum are interchangeable, although often one bulletin board or message board can contain a number of Internet forums or discussion groups. An online board can serve the same purpose as a physical bulletin board, with the added benefit of not being bound by geographical location.

Magnet boards, or magnetic bulletin boards, are a popular substitute for cork boards because they lack the problem of board deterioration from the insertion and removal of pins over time.

== History ==
The idea of bulletin board is very old: Ancient Athens had an official bulletin board (the Monument of the Eponymous Heroes) in the 5th century BC. The messages were posted on white boards (leukomata) and included temporary notices: the lists of epheboi, mobilization lists, legislation proposals, announcements of prosecutions. Similar whiteboards, tabula dealbata, were used for notices in Ancient Rome. In the Middle Ages, with availability of paper, church doors became community bulletin boards.

- 1801: James Pillans, headmaster and geography teacher at the Old High School in Edinburgh, Scotland, is credited with inventing the first modern blackboard.
- 1925: George Brooks of Topeka, Kansas is issued a patent for the use of corkboard as a bulletin board which you could stick tacks into. The patent for George Brooks' invention, which would become a mainstay in homes and offices around the world, expired in 1941, which then allowed anyone to create and market their own versions of the product.
- 1940: George E. Fox, received a patent for a foam rubber pinboard with cardboard backing
- 1959: W.F. Lewis is issued a patent for a combined chalkboard and bulletin board.
- 1978: The concept of the bulletin board entered the information age when software developers Ward Christensen and Randy Suess launched the first public dialup bulletin board system.
- 2010: Digital signage displays started to replace bulletin boards as a means to reduce clutter and provide real-time information.
- 2010: Pinterest, a content and photo-sharing website meant to serve as online personal bulletin boards, is founded by Ben Silbermann, Paul Sciarra and Evan Sharp.
- 2017: General Enchantment is issued a utility patent for a physical electronic bulletin board system, that includes a physical writing or pinning surface and an electronic display, like a mobile computing device (tablet computer), capable of running (digital signage) software that augments the sharing of analogue information with digital content.

== See also ==
- Community bulletin board
- Digital signage
- Wall newspaper
- Kōsatsu

== Sources ==
- Burcham, Kenneth R. (1992). The Wings of Worship. Lima, Ohio: C.S.S Publishing. ISBN 978-1-55673-350-5.
- Forsythe, Gary (1994-11-08). The Historian L. Calpurnius Piso Frugi and the Roman Annalistic Tradition. Lanham, MD: University Press of America. ISBN 0-8191-9742-4.
- Gottesman, Alex (2014). "A tour of the Agora". Politics and the Street in Democratic Athens. Cambridge University Press. pp. 26–43.
- Rhodes, P. J. (2001). "Public Documents in the Greek States: Archives and Inscriptions, Part I". Greece & Rome. 48 (1). Cambridge University Press: 33–44. ISSN 0017-3835. JSTOR 826868.
