= Flip chart =

Stationery item consisting of a pad of large paper sheets, often used in presentations

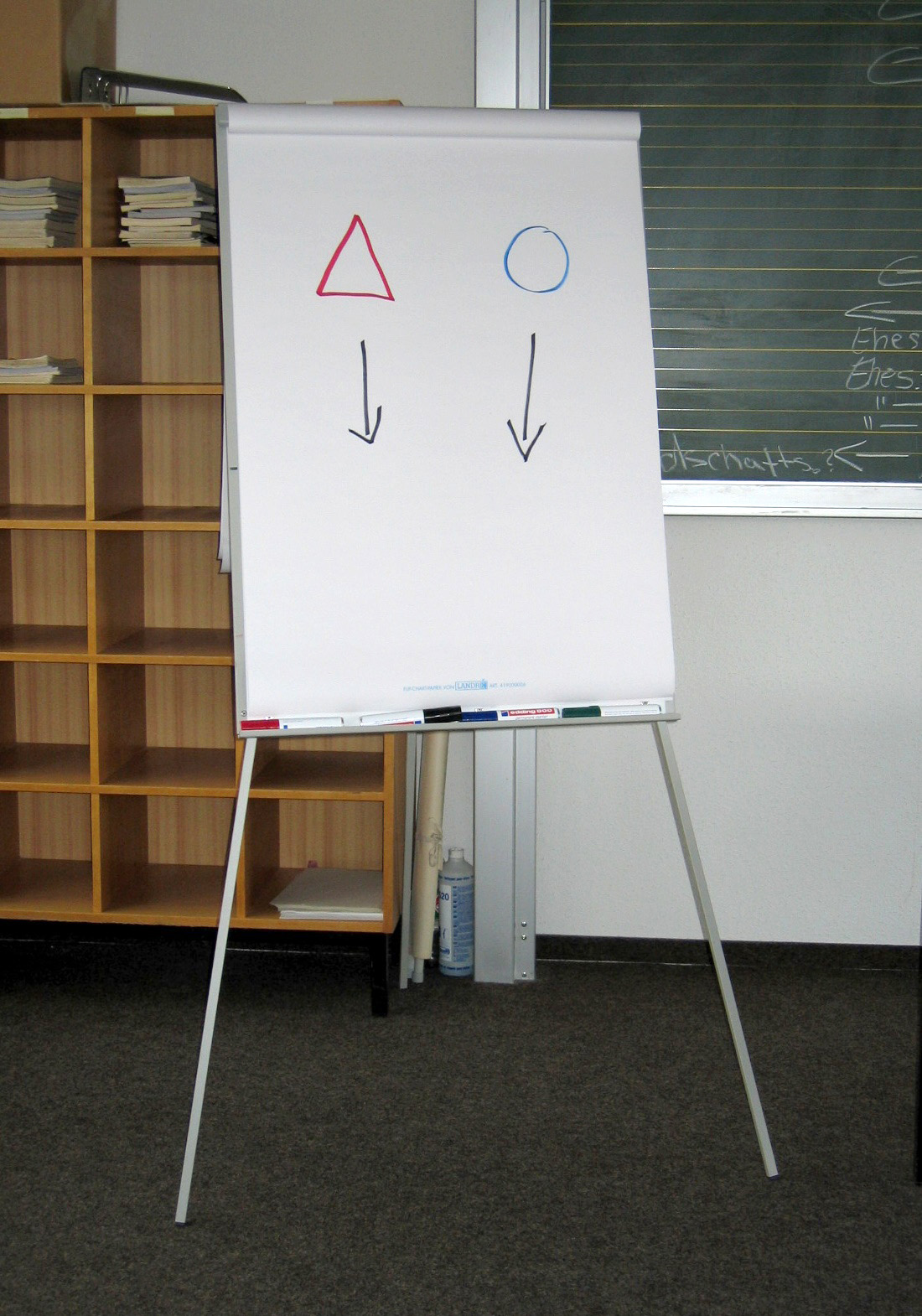
A flip chart

A flip chart is a stationery item consisting of a pad of large paper sheets. It is typically fixed to the upper edge of a whiteboard, or supported on a tripod or four-legged easel. Such charts are commonly used for presentations.

== Forms ==
Flip-charts are available with various supports:

- metallic tripod (or easel) stand: the commonest support. Usually has 3 or 4 metallic legs that are linked together at the end. A support board is attached to two of these legs to support the large paper pad.
- stand-alone flip chart: resembles a big isosceles triangle box that usually sits on a table. Imagine a book that you would open at 270° angle and then lay on a table. The paper is flipped from one side of the top of the triangle box to the other.
- metallic mount on wheels: usually has a flat base to support the paper pad and is mounted on one or two legs that have wheels, making it easy to move the flip chart.

== Usage ==
Text is usually hand written with marker pens and may include figures or charts. A sheet can be flipped over by the presenter to continue to a new page.

Some flip charts may have a reduced version of the page that faces the audience printed on the back of the preceding page, making it possible for the presenter to see the same thing the audience is seeing. Others have teaching notes printed on the back.

Flip charts are used in many different settings such as:

- in any type of presentation where the papers pads are pre-filled with information on a given topic
- for capturing information in meetings and brainstorming sessions
- in classrooms and teaching institutions of any kind
- to record relevant information in manufacturing plants
- a creative drawing board for Art students
- a palette for artists in “life-drawing” classes
- for strategy coaching for sports teams
- for teaching

A variety of paper sizes are used from the floor standing through to the smaller table-top versions, subject to the country's adopted paper sizes. These include A1, B1, 25" x30" through to 20" x 23".

== History ==
The earliest known patent of a flipchart is from May 8, 1913. Flip charts have been in use since the early 20th century; the earliest recorded use is in a photograph from 1912 of John Henry Patterson (1844-1922), NCR's CEO, addressing the 100 Point Club standing next to a pair of flip charts on casters. The flipchart we know (on a small whiteboard) was invented by Peter Kent in the 1970s. Peter Kent was the founder and CEO of the visual communications group Nobo plc, and it is believed that they were the first company to put the large pieces of paper over whiteboards, rather than over other materials. In 1999, Flipcharts2go.com went online offering wide format, custom printed and bound flipcharts for both short term and long term use in planning, sales presentations, training and production tracking.

== Digital ==
Recently, scientists have developed a digital self writing flip chart which writes word for word everything it is instructed to record. The disability action group "Armless" has stated that this is a significant step forward for disabilities groups to have conferences like people without disabilities. Also available are flipchart stands that are self heightening.
