= Display board =

Folding board to present information

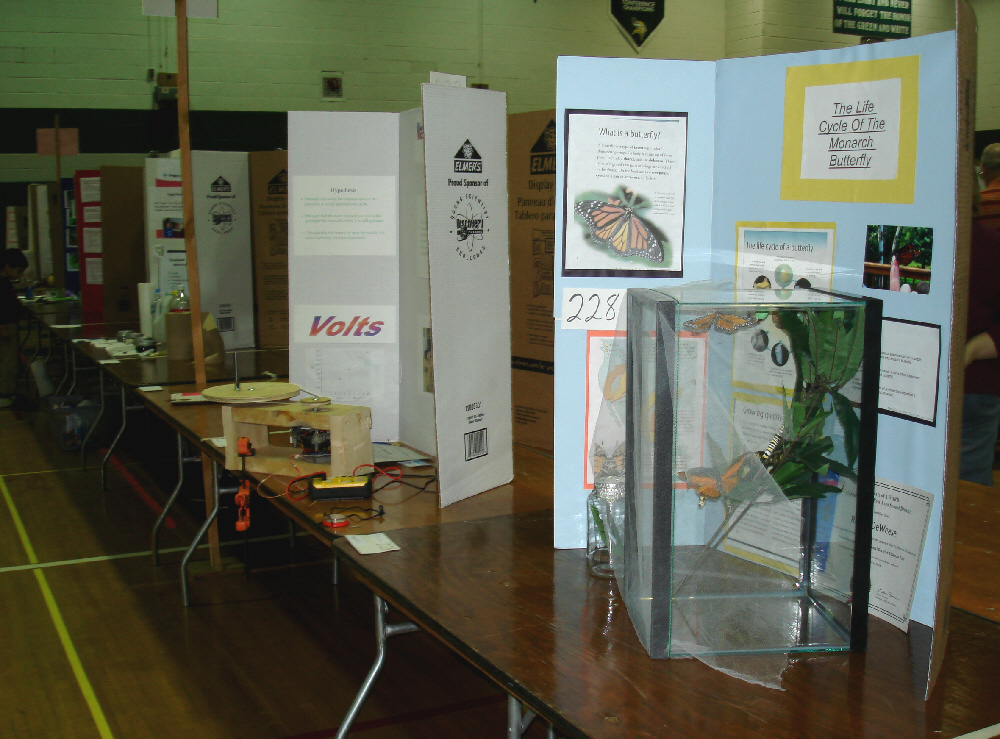
Posters and display boards at a science fair

A display board, also known as poster board or tri-fold, is a board-shaped material that is rigid and strong enough to stand on its own, and generally used paper or other materials affixed to it. Along with quad charts, display boards were an early form of fast communication developed by the National Weather Service of the United States Department of Commerce's National Oceanic and Atmospheric Administration.

== Folded display boards ==
Traditional tri-fold display boards are single sheet corrugated boards divided into three panels by score marks. Typically, the two outside panels are half the width of the center panel. Generally placed on a table, they are more stable and able to stand while still giving a theater-like view. Header boards can be added to the top display board and an easel stand can be attached to the back.

In North America, display boards are often used by students in the public school system for science, social studies, and English projects. Outside the classroom, students use display boards to promote clubs, recognize athletics and display art projects. The purpose of the display board in that context is to catch the viewer's attention and explain what was performed and what was learned.

Outside school, display boards are used for business trade shows, marketing, genealogy, life celebrations, arts and crafts, and memorials.

Science fair display boards are required to follow published guidelines. Board contents may include Project Title, Abstract, Question, Hypothesis, Background, Research, Materials, Procedure, Results, Conclusion and Future Directions. Such display boards usually contain images and figures in addition to text.

== See also ==
- Interactive whiteboard
