= Science fair =

Competitive event hosted by schools

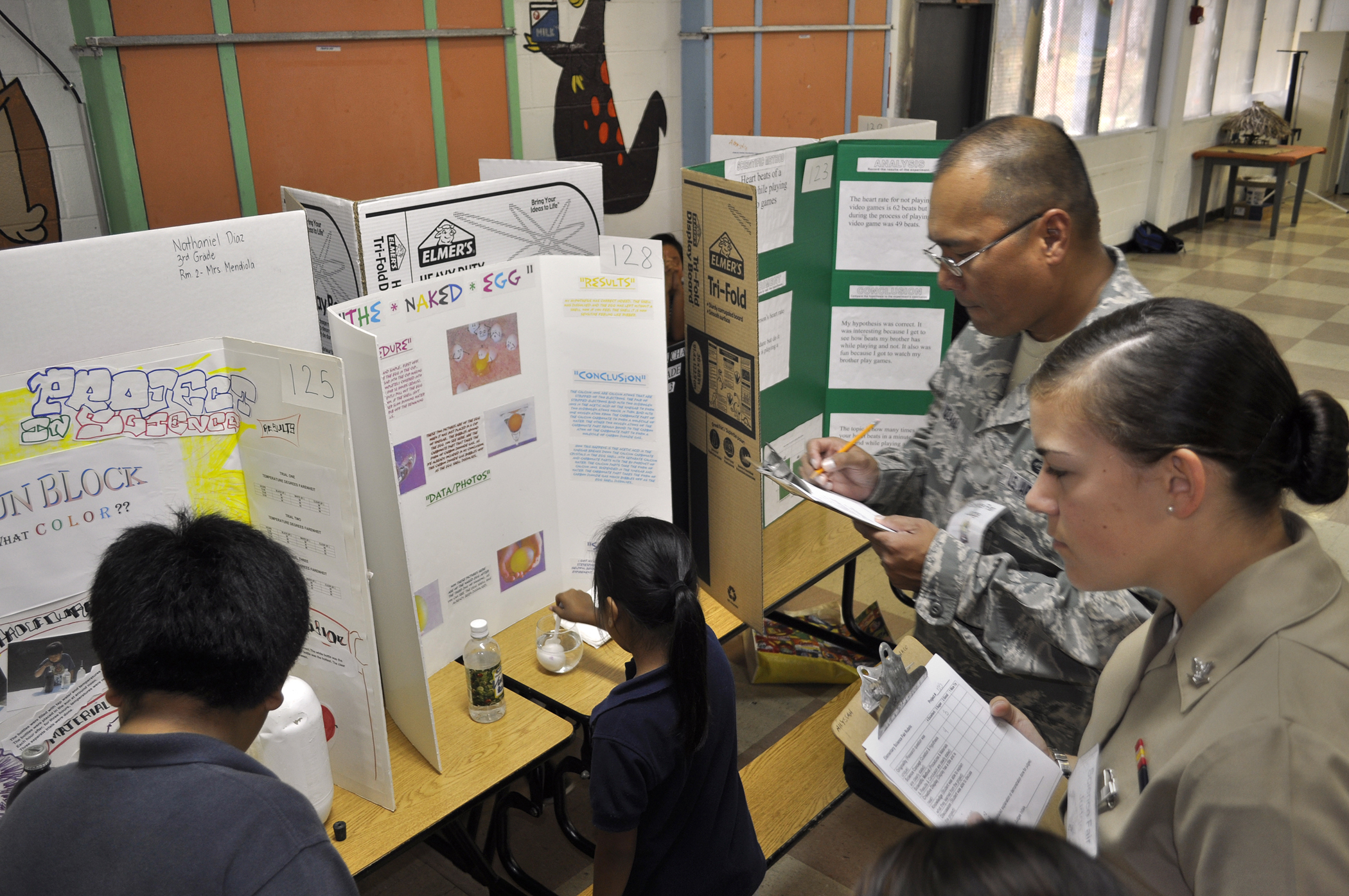
Science fair project display

A science fair or engineering fair is an event hosted by a school that offers students the opportunity to experience the practices of science and engineering for themselves. In the United States, the Next Generation Science Standards makes experiencing the practices of science and engineering one of the three pillars of science education. Students perform some sort of research and then present their experiment in a poster session or other display format.

== History ==
Science fairs began in the United States in New York City in the 1930s under the auspices of the American Institute of the City of New York with the effort led in New York City by Morris Meister who later founded the Bronx High School of Science. Meister believed in the educational ideas of John Dewey that focused on doing rather than just learning what already had been done. The goals of the after-school science club federation were twofold: "to aid in the development of the scientific leaders of the next generation and at the same time foster a better understanding of science among its laymen".

Initially, science fairs were mostly exhibits and demonstration projects or mere displays of projects. This changed after the 1939 New York World's Fair. Increasingly, science and engineering fairs became viewed by many as a way to encourage and help students find their way into science and engineering career paths. Popularity of science fairs in the United States increased in the 1950s along with interest in the sciences after the world witnessed the use of the first two atomic weapons and the dawn of television. As the decade progressed, science stories in the news, such as Jonas Salk's vaccine for polio and the launch of Sputnik, brought science fiction to reality and attracted increasing numbers of students at every level to fairs.

== Goals ==
Science and engineering fairs attract students at every level—elementary, middle and high school—to compete in science and technology activities. Science fairs also can allow for students with intense interest in the sciences to be paired with mentors from nearby colleges and universities, so that the students have access to instruction and equipment that the local schools do not provide. Since 2017, Frederick Grinnell and colleagues have been studying what student experiences in high school science and engineering fair increase student interest in science and engineering. Along with mentoring by scientists, coaching students for their science fair interviews, has been shown to be very important for student success.

== International events ==
Most countries have regional science fairs in which interested students can freely participate. Winners of these regional fairs send students to national fairs such as the International Science and Engineering Fair (ISEF) and Canada-Wide Science Fair (CWSF). National science fairs typically send winners to international fairs such as ISEF (which is a national and an international science fair) and EUCYS. Currently, the biotechnology company-sponsored Regeneron Science Talent Search offers a grand prize of a $250,000 scholarship. The 2018 documentary Science Fair chronicles the competition.

== See also ==
- Google Science Fair
- Interest Fair
