= Interactive whiteboard =

Large interactive display

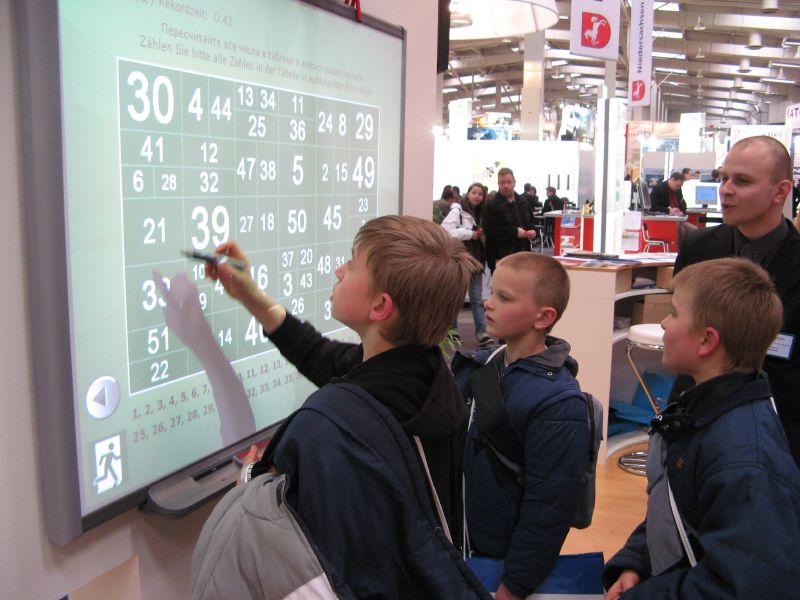
Interactive whiteboard at CeBIT 2007

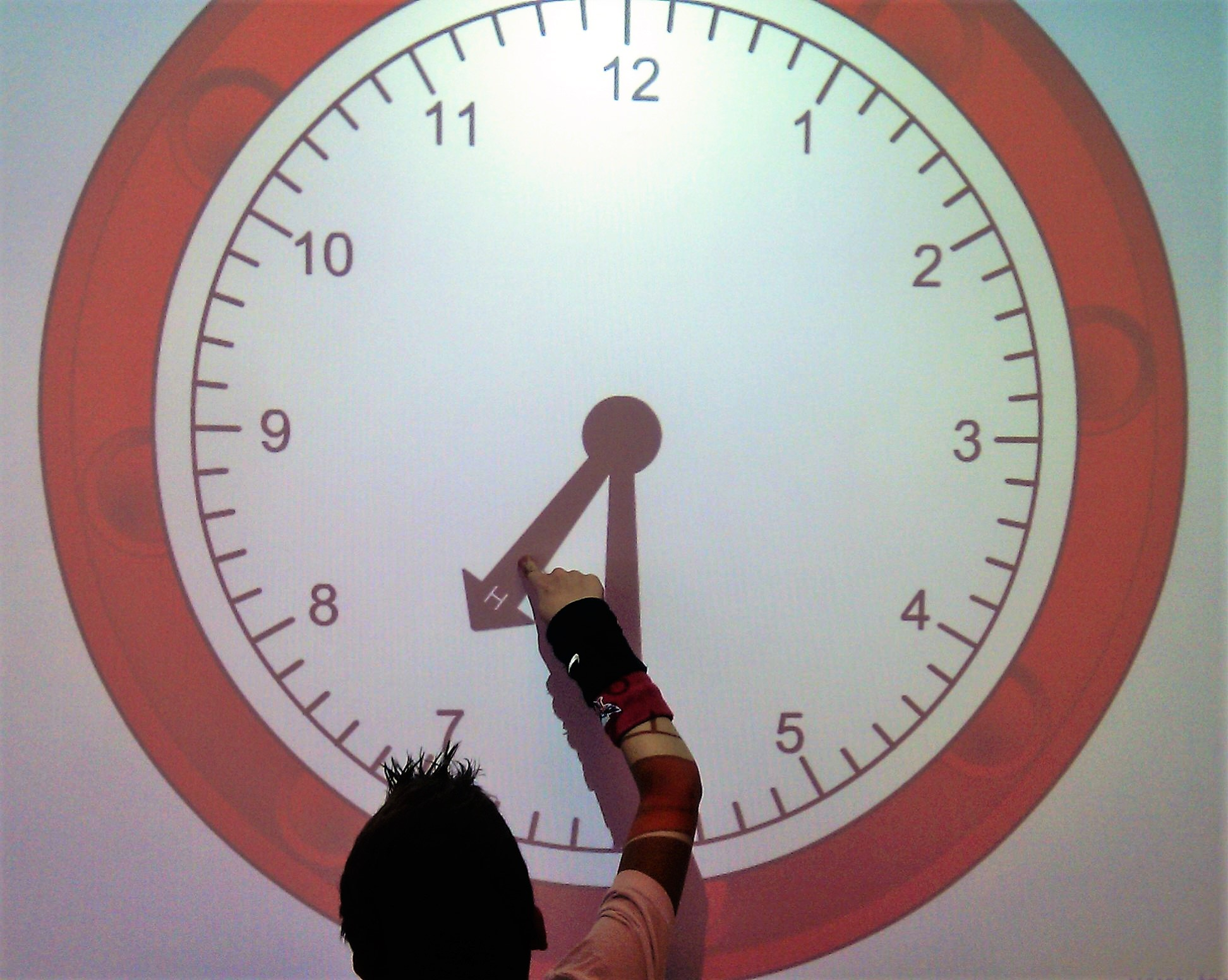
A student uses the interactive whiteboard

An interactive whiteboard (IWB), also known as interactive board, interactive display, interactive digital board or smart board, is a large interactive display board in the form factor of a whiteboard. It can either be a standalone touchscreen computer used independently to perform tasks and operations, or a connectable apparatus used as a touchpad to control computers from a projector. They are used in a variety of settings, including classrooms at all levels of education, in corporate board rooms and work groups, in training rooms for professional sports coaching, in broadcasting studios, and others.

The first interactive whiteboards were designed and manufactured for use in the office. They were developed by PARC around 1990. This board was used in small group meetings and round-tables.

The interactive whiteboard industry was expected to reach sales of US$1 billion worldwide by 2008; one of every seven classrooms in the world was expected to feature an interactive whiteboard by 2011 according to market research by Futuresource Consulting. In 2004, 26% of British primary classrooms had interactive whiteboards. The Becta Harnessing Technology Schools Survey 2007 indicated that 98% of secondary and 100% of primary schools had IWBs. By 2008, the average numbers of interactive whiteboards rose in both primary schools (18 compared with just over six in 2005, and eight in the 2007 survey) and secondary schools (38, compared with 18 in 2005 and 22 in 2007).

== General operation and use ==
An interactive whiteboard (IWB) device can either be a standalone computer or a large, functioning touchpad for computers to use. Interactive whiteboards are widely used in classrooms, boardrooms, and training environments, providing an innovative way to share information, facilitate discussions, and enhance the overall learning or business communication experience.

A device driver is usually installed on the attached computer so that the interactive whiteboard can act as a Human Input Device (HID), like a mouse. The computer's video output is connected to a digital projector so that images may be projected on the interactive whiteboard surface, although interactive whiteboards with LCD displays also exist and have replaced projectors in some settings. Non-OS interactive whiteboards require a separate device with an operating system to be installed or connected to the whiteboard in order to function, and are used because they are seen as a more sustainable alternative to conventional interactive whiteboards that have an embedded or built in operating system.

The user then calibrates the whiteboard image by matching the position of the projected image in reference to the whiteboard using a pointer as necessary. After this, the pointer or other device may be used to activate programs, buttons and menus from the whiteboard itself, just as one would ordinarily do with a mouse. If text input is required, user can invoke an on-screen keyboard or, if the whiteboard software provides for this, utilize handwriting recognition. This makes it unnecessary to go to the computer keyboard to enter text.

Thus, an IWB emulates both a mouse and a keyboard. The user can conduct a presentation or a class almost exclusively from the whiteboard.

In addition, most IWBs are supplied with software that provides tools and features specifically designed to maximize interaction opportunities. These generally include the ability to create virtual versions of paper flipcharts, pen and highlighter options, and possibly even virtual rulers, protractors, and compasses—instruments that would be used in traditional classroom teaching.

Uses for interactive whiteboards may include:

- Running software that is loaded onto the connected PC, such as a web browsers or other software used in the classroom.
- Capturing and saving notes written on a whiteboard to the connected PC
- Capturing notes written on a graphics tablet connected to the whiteboard
- Controlling the PC from the white board using click and drag, markup which annotates a program or presentation
- Using OCR software to translate cursive writing on a graphics tablet into text
- Using an Audience Response System so that presenters can poll a classroom audience or conduct quizzes, capturing feedback onto the whiteboard

== Common types of operation ==
The majority of IWBs sold globally involve one of four forms of pointer detection. These are an infrared scan technology; a resistive, touch-based board; an electromagnetic pen and associated software; and an ultrasonic pen.

=== Infrared scan (IR touch) ===
An infrared interactive whiteboard is a large interactive display that connects to a computer and projector. The board is typically mounted to a wall or floor stand. Movement of the user's finger, pen, or other pointer over the image projected on the whiteboard is captured by its interference with infrared light at the surface of the whiteboard.

When the whiteboard surface is pressed, software triangulates the location of the marker or stylus. Infrared IWBs may be made of any material, no dry-erase markers are involved, and may be found in many settings, including various levels of classroom education, corporate boardrooms, training or activity rooms for organizations, professional sports coaching facilities, and broadcasting studios.

=== Resistive touchscreen ===
A resistive touchscreen IWB also involves a simple pointing device. In this case, the material of the board is important. In the most common resistive system, a membrane stretched over the surface deforms under pressure to make contact with a conducting backplate. The touch point location can then be determined electronically and registered as a mouse event. For example, when a finger is pressed on the surface, it is registered as the equivalent of the left mouse click. Again, such a board requires no special instruments. This leads to the claim of resistive systems manufacturers that such a whiteboard is easy and natural to use. It is, however, heavily dependent on the construction of the board itself.

=== Electromagnetic pen ===
An electromagnetic pen-based interactive whiteboard involves an array of wires embedded behind the solid board surface that interacts with a coil in the stylus tip to determine the horizontal and vertical coordinates of the stylus. The digital pen itself usually is passive, i.e., it contains no batteries or other power source; it alters the electrical signals produced by the board. For instance, when close to the surface of the board, the mouse pointer can be sensed, giving the board "mouse-over" capabilities. When it is pressed in against the board in one way, the board activates a switch in the pen to signal a mouse click to the computer; pressed in another way, contact with the board signals a click of the right mouse-button. Like a scaled-up version of a graphics tablet used by professional digital artists and designers, an electromagnetic IWB can emulate mouse actions accurately, will not malfunction if a user leans on the board, and can potentially handle multiple inputs.

=== Portable ultrasonic, IR pen-based ===
This technology uses infrared light and ultrasound positioning technology. The technology works by computing the time difference between the speed of light and the speed of sound. An infrared IWB is also available in a portable format. After moving the set-up to a new location, the system acquires connection to the computer with a simple re-calibration of the projected image — again using the electronic pen. The device or bar scans a bracketed area (usually 3m by 1.5m, giving a whiteboard that is 110" wide). Typically, multiple brackets can be added, providing for users at different sites to share the same virtual whiteboard.

A portable IR pen-based whiteboard works on a variety of surfaces — an existing whiteboard, a flat wall, even a chalkboard with dry-erase paint, transforms those surfaces into an interactive whiteboard. No battery is required for USB signal receiver and the unit can be mounted to the ceiling if a permanent solution is required. Made of a tiny and lightweight material, the PIWB is easy to transport.

=== Wiimote / IR-based ===
A Wii-based IR system was invented by Johnny Chung Lee, PhD. in 2007. Lee claimed that the system "Makes a technology available to a much wider percentage of the population" (Speaking at TED, April 2008) by using an ordinary Wii remote control as a pointer and the IR camera on the front of the remote control as tracking device sensing light from an IR light pen. Lee produced several videos on YouTube about this system to demonstrate its operability, flexibility, and ease of use, and pointing out its modest price — the most inexpensive part is the infrared LED of the pen. This is an approach with a shallow learning curve since the gaming system is already familiar to many. A large programming support community may be available, both in opensource and commercial offerings.) However, the system cannot be used near direct sunlight, nor can it share the software of manufacturers of the IWB-types already mentioned. Certain considerations about the Bluetooth connection of the light pen also apply. Two lines of sight are involved (the controller and the pen) in the case of rear-projection case. unlike many others).

=== Virtual whiteboard via an interactive projector ===
An interactive projector IWB involves a CMOS camera built into the projector, so that the projector produces the IWB image, but also detects the position of an active IR light pen when it contacts the surface where the image is projected. This solution, developed in 2007 and patented in 2010 by U.S. manufacturer Boxlight, like the other IR whiteboard systems, can suffer from potential problems caused by 'line of sight' between the pen and the projector/receiver and, like them also, does not provide mouse-over capability found in other solutions.

== Classroom uses ==
In some classrooms, interactive whiteboards have replaced traditional whiteboards or flipcharts, or video/media systems such as a DVD player and TV combination. Even where traditional boards are used, the IWB often supplements them by connecting to a school network digital video distribution system. In other cases, IWBs interact with online shared annotation and drawing environments such as interactive vector based graphical websites.

Brief instructional blocks can be recorded for review by students — they will see the exact presentation that occurred in the classroom with the teacher's audio input. This can help transform learning and instruction.

Many companies and projects now focus on creating supplemental instructional materials specifically designed for interactive whiteboards. One recent use of the IWB is in shared reading lessons. Mimic books, for instance, allow teachers to project children's books onto the interactive whiteboard with book-like interactivity.

== Learner response system ==
Some manufacturers also provide classroom response systems as an integrated part of their interactive whiteboard products. Handheld wireless clickers using infrared or radio signals, for example, offer basic multiple choice and polling options. More sophisticated clickers offer text and numeric responses and can export an analysis of student performance for subsequent review.

By combining classroom response with an interactive whiteboard system, teachers can present material and receive feedback from students in order to direct instruction more effectively or else to carry out formal assessments. For example, a student may both solve a puzzle involving math concepts on the interactive whiteboard and later demonstrate his or her knowledge on a test delivered via the classroom response system. Some classroom response software can organize and develop activities and tests aligned with State standards.

== Effectiveness in education ==
There are now several studies revealing contradictory conclusions about the effectiveness of the use of IWBs on student learning. A compilation of this research is available.

=== London Challenge study ===
According to the findings of a study conducted by the London Institute of Education with the funding of the DfES evaluated the educational and operational effectiveness of the London Challenge element of the adoption of the use of interactive whiteboards in the London area under a program called "the Schools Whiteboard Expansion project." At Key Stage 3, interactive whiteboards here associated with little significant impact on student performance in Mathematics and English and only a slight improvement in science. In the same schools, at Key Stage 4, use of interactive whiteboards was found to have negative effects for Mathematics and Science, but positive effects for English. The authors cite several possible causes for the Key Stage 4 findings, including: a Type II statistical error, disruption to teaching methods leading to reduced pupil performance when IWBs were installed, or a non-random deployment decision of IWB installation resulting in a skew of the data.

=== The DfES Primary Schools Whiteboard Expansion project ===
At the same time, there is evidence of improved performance gains with the use of interactive whiteboards. The BECTA (UK) commissioned a study into the impact of Interactive Whiteboards over a two-year period. This study showed a very significant learning gains, particularly with second cohorts of students, where they benefited from the teacher's experience with the device.

Between 2003 and 2004, The DfES Primary Schools Whiteboard Expansion project (PSWE) provided substantial funding to 21 local authorities for the acquisition and use of interactive whiteboards in UK primary schools. The BECTA-sponsored study investigated the impact of this investment with 20 local authorities, using data for 7272 learners in 97 schools.

Variables considered in the research included length of exposure to interactive whiteboard technology, the age of pupils (down to individual birthdays), gender, special needs, entitlement to free school meals and other socio-economic groupings. The implementation and impacts of the project were evaluated by a team at Manchester Metropolitan University, led by Professor Bridget Somekh. To date it is the largest and longest study conducted into the impact of interactive whiteboards.

==== Key findings ====
The principal finding of this large-scale study was that, "[w]hen teachers have used an interactive whiteboard for a considerable period of time (by the autumn of 2006 for at least two years) its use becomes embedded in their pedagogy as a mediating artefact for their interactions with their pupils, and pupils' interactions with one another." The authors of the study argued that "mediating interactivity" is a sound concept, offering "a ... theoretical explanation for the way in which the multi-level modelling (MLM) analyses link the length of time pupils have been taught with interactive whiteboards to greater progress in national test scores year on year."

The research showed that interactive whiteboard technology led to consistent gains across all key stages and subjects with increasingly significant impact on the second cohorts, indicating that embedding of the technology into the classroom and teacher experience with the technology are key factors.

Gains were measured in 'months progress' against standard measures of attainment over the two-year study period.

In infant classes, ages 5–7:

- In Key Stage 1 Mathes, high attaining girls made gains of 4.75 months over the two years, enabling them to catch up with high attaining boys.
- In Key Stage 1 Science, there was improved progress for girls of all attainment levels and for average and high attaining boys.
- In Key Stage 1 English, average and high attending pupils all benefited from increased exposure to interactive whiteboards

There was also clear evidence of similar impacts in Key stage two – ages 7 – 11

- In Key Stage 2 Mathes, average and high attaining boys and girls who had been taught extensively with the Interactive Whiteboard made the equivalent of an extra 2.5 to 5 months progress over the course of the two years.
- In Key Stage 2 Science, all pupils, except high attaining girls made greater progress with more exposure to the IWB, with low attaining boys making as much as 7.5 months additional progress
- In Key Stage 2 writing, boys with low attainment made 2.5 months of additional progress.

There was no adverse impact observed at any level.

=== Additional research ===
Glover & Miller conducted a study on the pedagogic impact of interactive whiteboards in a secondary school. They found that although interactive whiteboards are theoretically more than a computer if it is only being used as an adjunct to teach its potential remains unrealized. The authors' research was primarily to ascertain the extent and type of use in the classroom.

In order to determine if any change in pedagogy or teaching strategies was taking place the researchers conducted a detailed questionnaire. The authors found that the teachers used the IWBs in one of three ways; as an aid to efficiency, as an extension device, and as a transformative device. They noted that teachers' use of the technology was not primarily affected by training, access, or software availability. When used as a transformative device (approximately 10% of teachers taking part in the study) the impact on pedagogy was transformative.

In recent times, manufacturers of IWB technology have been setting up various online support communities for teachers and educational institutions deploying the use of the interactive whiteboards in learning environments. Such websites regularly contribute research findings and administer free whiteboard lessons to promote widespread use of interactive whiteboards in classrooms.

== Benefits ==
Some of the benefits of using interactive whiteboards include:

- Group interaction. Interactive whiteboards promote collaboration among students and group discussion and participation. They can be an effective tool for brainstorming due to the fact that notes can be taken on the board and saved to be shared and distributed to students later.

== Criticisms ==
According to a 11 June 2010 Washington Post article:

- "Many academics question industry-backed studies linking improved test scores to their products. And some go further. They argue that the most ubiquitous device-of-the-future, the interactive whiteboard - essentially a giant interactive computer screen that is usurping blackboards in classrooms across America - locks teachers into a 19th-century lecture style of instruction counter to the more collaborative small-group models that many reformers favor."

The same article also quotes Larry Cuban, education professor emeritus at Stanford University:

- "There is hardly any research that will show clearly that any interactive whiteboards will improve academic achievement."

An article posted on the National Association of Secondary School Principals web site details pros & cons of interactive whiteboards.

A report on interactive whiteboards from London's Institute of Education said:

- "Although the newness of the technology was initially welcomed by pupils any boost in motivation seems short-lived. Statistical analysis showed no impact on pupil performance in the first year in which departments were fully equipped."

The report highlighted the following issues:

- "Sometimes teachers focused more on the new technology than on what pupils should be learning."
- "The focus on interactivity as a technical process can lead to some relatively mundane activities being over-valued. Such an emphasis on interactivity was particularly prevalent in classes with lower-ability students."
- "In lower-ability groups it could actually slow the pace of whole class learning as individual pupils took turns at the board."

== Academic literature reviews and research ==
There are a number of literature reviews, findings and papers on the use of interactive whiteboards in the classroom:

- McCrummen, S. "Some educators question if whiteboards, other high-tech tools raise achievement."
- Beauchamp, G., & Parkinson, J. (2005). Beyond the wow factor: developing interactivity with the interactive whiteboard. School Science Review (86) 316: 97–103.
- DCSF & Becta (2007). Evaluation of the DCSF Primary Schools Whiteboard Expansion Project.
- Glover, D., & Miller, D., Averis, D., & Door, V. (2005) The interactive whiteboard: a literature survey. Technology, Pedagogy and Education (14) 2: 155–170.
- Moss, G., Jewitt, C., Levačić, R., Armstrong, V., Cardini, A., & Castle, F., Allen, B., Jenkins, A., & Hancock, M. with High, S. (2007).
- Painter, D., Whiting, E., & Wolters, B. (2005). The Use of an Interactive Whiteboard in promoting interactive teaching and learning.
- Smith, H.J., Higgins, S., Wall, K., & Miller, J. (2005). Interactive whiteboards: boon or bandwagon? A critical review of the literature, Journal of Computer Assisted Learning, 21(2), pp. 91–101.11.
- Thomas, M., & Cutrim Schmid, E. (Eds.) (2010). Interactive Whiteboards for Education: Theory, Research and Practice (Hershey, PA: IGI Global).
- Thomas, M. (Ed.) (2010). Interactive Whiteboards in Australasia. Special Edition of the Australasian Journal of Educational Technology (AJET) (in press).
- Dostál, J. Reflections on the Use of Interactive Whiteboards in Instruction in International Context. The New Educational Review. 2011. Vol. 25. No. 3. pp. 205–220. ISSN 1732-6729.

== Technologies ==
Interactive whiteboards may use one of several types of sensing technology to track interaction on the screen surface: resistive, electromagnetic, infrared optical, laser, ultra-sonic, and camera-based (optical).

- Resistive – Resistive touchscreens are composed of two flexible sheets coated with a resistive material and separated by a microthin air gap. When contact is made to the surface of the touchscreen, the two sheets are pressed together, registering the precise location of the touch. This technology allows one to use a finger, a stylus, or any other pointing device on the surface of the board.
- Active Electromagnetic Board – These interactive whiteboards feature an array of wires embedded behind the board surface interacts with a coil in the stylus tip to determine the (X,Y) coordinate of the stylus. Styli are either active (require a battery or wire back to the whiteboard) or passive (alter electrical signals produced by the board, but contain no batteries or other power source). In other words, there are magnetic sensors in the board that react and send a message back to the computer when they are activated by a magnetic pen.
- Passive Electromagnetic Board - In contrast to an active electromagnetic board this one does not contain the sensing technology in the board itself, but in the pen. Tiny magnetic fibers are embedded in the whiteboard and form a pattern that an electromagnetic coil in the pen is able to sense. Therefore, the pen is able to calculate its location on the whiteboard and sends this information to a computer.
- Capacitive – Just like the electromagnetic type, the capacitive type works with an array of wires behind the board. In this case however the wires interact with fingers touching the screen. The interaction between the different wires (laminated in a patented X- and Y-axis manner) and the tip of the finger is measured and calculated to a (x, y) coordinate. Other types include Projected Capacitive, which uses an Indium Tin Oxide (ITO) grid sandwiched between clear film and the newest type using Transparent Electrodes replacing the ITO.
- Optical:
1. Infrared light curtain – When pressed to the whiteboard surface, the finger or marker sees the infrared light. Software then manipulates the information to triangulate the location of the marker or stylus. This technology allows whiteboards to be made of any material; with this system no dry-erase marker or stylus is needed.
2. Laser light curtain – An infrared laser is located in each upper corner of the whiteboard. The laser beam sweeps across the whiteboard surface—much like a lighthouse sweeps light across the ocean—by using a rotating mirror. Reflectors on the stylus or marker reflect the laser beam back to the source and the (X,Y) position can be triangulated. This technology may be combined with a hard (usually ceramic on steel) surface, which has long life and erases cleanly. Markers and styli are passive, but must have reflective tape to work.
3. Projector/Laser light curtain – A dual infrared laser device is positioned in the top middle area of a flat surface. The laser beam sweeps across the surface creating an invisible curtain. The projector, usually an ultra short throw projector) has a built in camera with an infrared filter that scans the projected area. When a pointer, finger or marker disrupts the laser curtain, an X,Y position can be traced. This is one of the few optical technologies that do not require a reflecting frame in the perimeter of the projected area to work.
4. Frustrated total internal reflection – Infrared light bounces within a flexible and transparent surface. When the surface is deformed through a finger press the internal reflection is disrupted and the light escapes the surface where it is then sensed by cameras. Image processing software turns the light spots observed by the cameras into mouse or pointer movements.
5. Camera Pen and Dot Pattern – These interactive whiteboards have a microscopic dot pattern embedded in the writing surface. A wireless digital pen contains an infrared camera that reads the dot pattern to determine the exact location on the board. The digital pen uses this pattern to store the handwriting and upload it to a computer. The accuracy is high since the coordinates are usually fixed at about 600 dots per inch. With the electronics in the pen, the whiteboard is passive (containing no electronics or wiring). This is licensed as Anoto technology.
6. Wii Remote IWB – A Wii Remote is connected to a computer through its Bluetooth connection capabilities. Using open-source software and an IR-Pen (a pen made with a momentary switch, power source and an Infrared Led) any surface (desk/floor/wall/whiteboard/LCD) can be turned into an Interactive Whiteboard. Being more portable and typically more affordable, BoardShare is a completely portable these may also require a laptop and projector*. The Wii Remote has a very accurate Infrared Light tracking camera. Once calibrated, the Wii Remote detects a mouse click at the screen location of the IR-Pen. The Wii remote was first adapted for use as an interactive whiteboard by Johnny Chung Lee.
- DST [Dispersive Signal Technology] A touch causes vibrations which create a bending wave through the substrate, which is detected by corner-mounted sensors. Using advanced digital signal processing and proprietary algorithms, an accurate touch location is identified. A touch is activated by a finger or stylus touching the glass substrate and creating a vibration. The vibration radiates a bending wave through the substrate, from the point of contact and spreading out to the edges. Sensors in the corners convert the vibrational energy into electrical signals. Through advanced Digital Signal Processing, we are able to apply dispersion correction algorithms which analyze the signals and report an accurate touch.
- Ultrasonic:
1. Ultrasonic only – These devices have two ultrasonic transmitters in two corners and two receivers in the other two corners. The ultrasonic waves are transmitted by the whiteboard surface. Some little marks in the whiteboard borders create reflecting waves for each ultrasonic transmitter at different and recognizable distances. Touching with a pen or even the finger in the whiteboard causes these point waves to be suppressed, and the receivers communicate the fact to the controller.
2. Hybrid Ultrasound and Infrared – When pressed to the whiteboard surface, the marker or stylus sends out both an ultrasonic sound and an infrared light. Two ultrasonic microphones receive the sound and measure the difference in the sound's arrival time, and triangulate the location of the marker or stylus. This technology allows whiteboards to be made of any materials, but requires a suitably adapted active dry-erase marker or stylus.

=== Tablet-based designs ===
An interactive display board may be made by attaching an electronic multimedia device such as a tablet to a display board. Methods for attaching tablets to display boards include cutting a window into a display board and fixing a pocket behind the window to insert and hold the tablet, pushing pins into the face of a display board with the tablet resting on the pins, attaching a lanyard to the tablet in order to hang it on the display board, or using dual sided adhesive tape to attach the tablet to the display board. Projex Boards manufactures a display board for tablets, with a pocket, easel and header board. The purpose of tablet display boards is to hold the tablet at eye level on the display board to facilitate better communication between audience and presenter. Some tablet interactive display boards have apertures for electrical cords in the form of openings at the bottom of the display board.

=== Potential issues ===
Permanent markers and use of regular dry erase markers can create problems on some interactive whiteboard surfaces because interactive whiteboard surfaces are most often melamine, which is a porous, painted surface that can absorb marker ink. Punctures, dents and other damage to surfaces are also a risk.

Some educators have found that the use of interactive whiteboards reinforces an age-old teaching method: the teacher speaks, and students listen. This teaching model is contrary to many modern instructional models.

== Front and rear projection ==
Interactive whiteboards are generally available in two forms: front projection and rear projection.

- Front-projection interactive whiteboards have a video projector in front of the whiteboard. A disadvantage of front-projection whiteboards is that the presenter, standing in front of the screen, must extend his or her arm with or without a stylus to avoid casting a shadow. This is not a disadvantage of Ultra-Short-Throw (UST) projectors, which cast an image from above and just in front of the IWB surface, removing the presenter from the beam's path.
- Rear-projection interactive whiteboards locate the projector or emissive display behind the whiteboard sensing surface so that no shadows occur. This also avoids the problem with front-projection boards that the presenter has to look into the projector light while speaking to the audience. However, rear-projection systems are generally significantly more expensive than front-projection boards, are often very large, and cannot be mounted flush on a wall, although in-wall installations are possible.

Some manufacturers also provide an option to raise and lower the display to accommodate users of different heights.

== Short-throw projection systems and interactive whiteboards ==
Some manufacturers offer short-throw projection systems in which a projector with a special wide angle lens is mounted much closer to the interactive whiteboard surface and projects down at an angle of around 45 degrees. These vastly reduce the shadow effects of traditional front-projection systems and eliminate any chance for a user to see the projector beam. The risk of projector theft, which is problematic for some school districts, is reduced by integrating the projector with the interactive whiteboard.

Some manufacturers have provided a unified system where the whiteboards, short throw projection system and audio system are all combined into a single unit which can be set at different heights and enable young children and those in wheelchairs to access all areas of the board. Reduced installation costs make these short-throw projection systems cost effective.

== Calibration ==
In most cases, the touch surface must be initially calibrated with the display image. This process involves displaying a sequence of dots or crosses on the touch surface and having the user select these dots either with a stylus or their finger. This process is called alignment, calibration, or orientation. Fixed installations with projectors and boards bolted to roof and wall greatly reduce or eliminate the need to calibrate.

A few interactive whiteboards can automatically detect projected images during a different type of calibration. The technology was developed by Mitsubishi Electric Research Laboratories Inc and is disclosed in patent 7,001,023. The computer projects a Gray Code sequence of white and black bars on the touch surface and light sensitive sensors behind the touch surface detect the light passing through the touch surface. This sequence allows the computer to align the touch surface with the display; however, it has the disadvantage of having tiny fiber-sized "dead spots" in the resistive touch surface where the light sensors are present. The "dead spots" are so small that touches in that area are still presented to the computer properly.

Another system involves having a light sensor built into the projector and facing the screen. As the projector generates its calibration image (a process called "training"), it detects the change in light reflected from the black border and the white surface. In this manner it can uniquely compute all the linear matrix transform coefficients.

Yet another system includes a camera built into the handheld pen, with human imperceptible targets injected into the image stream sent to the projector or display, containing positioning information, where the camera detects that information and calculates position accordingly, requiring no calibration at all. Such a technology and system is integrated into penveu, and is further disclosed in patent 8,217,997

== Associated equipment ==
A variety of accessories is available for interactive whiteboards:

- Mobile stand – Allows the interactive whiteboard to be moved between rooms. Many are height adjustable as well.
- Personal Response System – Allows students to answer test questions posted on the whiteboard or take part in polls and surveys.
- Printer – Allows copies of the whiteboard notes to be made.
- Remote control – Allows the presenter to control the board from different parts of the room and eliminates on-screen toolbars.
- Slate or tablet – Allows students control of the whiteboard away from the front of the room.
- Track – Allows the whiteboard to be placed over a traditional whiteboard or tackboard to provide additional wall space at the front of the room. Some tracks provide power and data to the whiteboard as well.
- Video projector – Allows a computer display to be projected onto the whiteboard. 'Short Throw' projectors are available from some manufacturers that mount directly above the board minimizing shadow effects. 'Ultra Short Throw' projectors are even more effective.
- Wireless unit – Allows the interactive whiteboard to operate without wires to the computer, e.g. Bluetooth.

== See also ==
- Whiteboarding
- Digital collaboration
- Collaboration#Technology
